= Bartolini Tondo =

Painting by Filippo Lippi

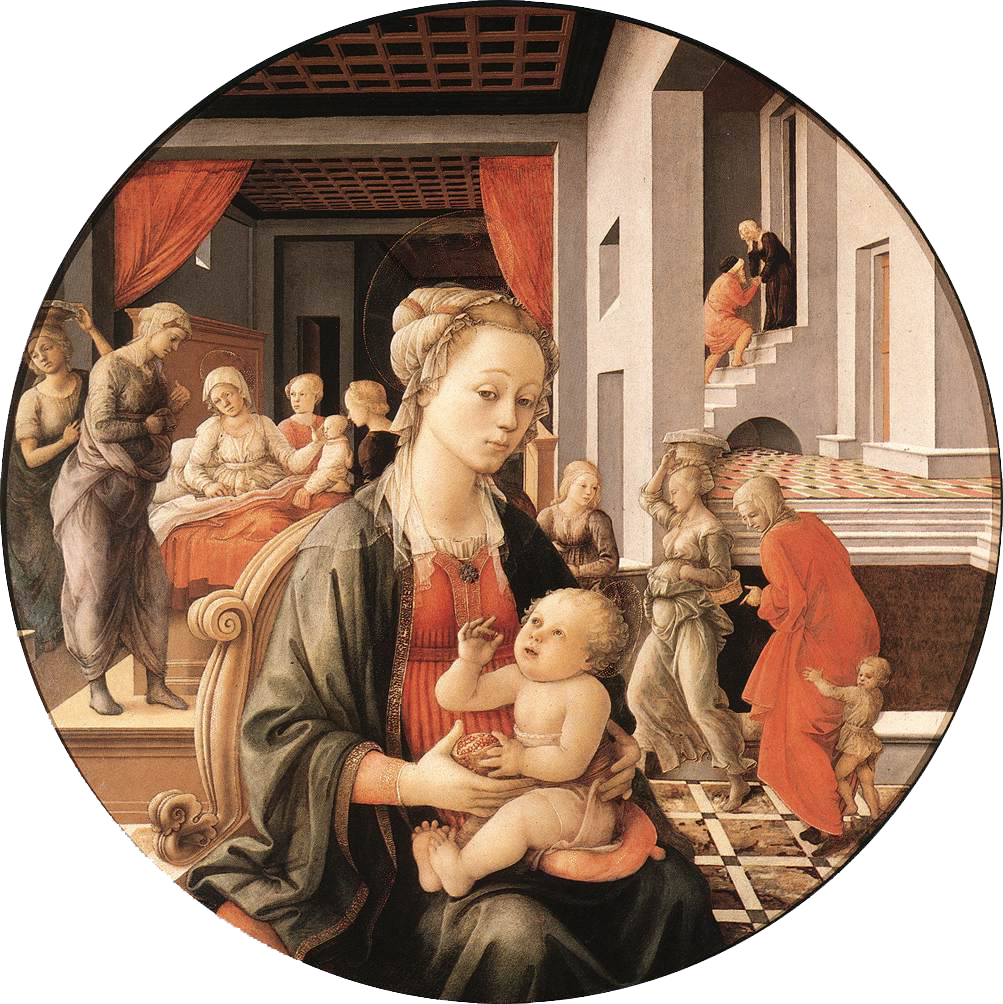
- Year: 1452–1453
- Medium: Tempera on panel
- Movement: Italian Renaissance
- Subject: Virgin Mary with Christ Child
- Dimensions: 135 cm diameter (51 in)
- Location: Palazzo Pitti, Palatine Gallery, Florence

The Bartolini Tondo is a tempera-on-panel painting by the Italian Renaissance artist Filippo Lippi. 135 cm in diameter, it is also known as Madonna with the Child and Scenes from the Life of St Anne or Madonna and Child with the Birth of the Virgin and the Meeting between St Joachim and St Anne. It is now in the Galleria Palatina in the Palazzo Pitti in Florence. The work is mentioned in the Palazzo Pitti inventories in 1761, which mention it as being stored or displayed in the "soffitte" or attics.

== History ==
It has been traditionally dated to 1452–1453 and held to have been commissioned by Leonardo Bartolini of Florence early in the painter's stay in Florence, interpreting mentions in a number of documents as the work. However, more recent studies by Jeffrey Ruda interpret the coat of arms on the work's reverse as that of a member of the Martelli family and re-date it to between 1465 and 1470 by similarities to the artist's final frescoes in the Capella Maggiore at Prato Cathedral.
