= Palazzo Pitti =

Renaissance palace and museum in Florence, Italy

Coordinates: 43.7652°N 11.2501°E

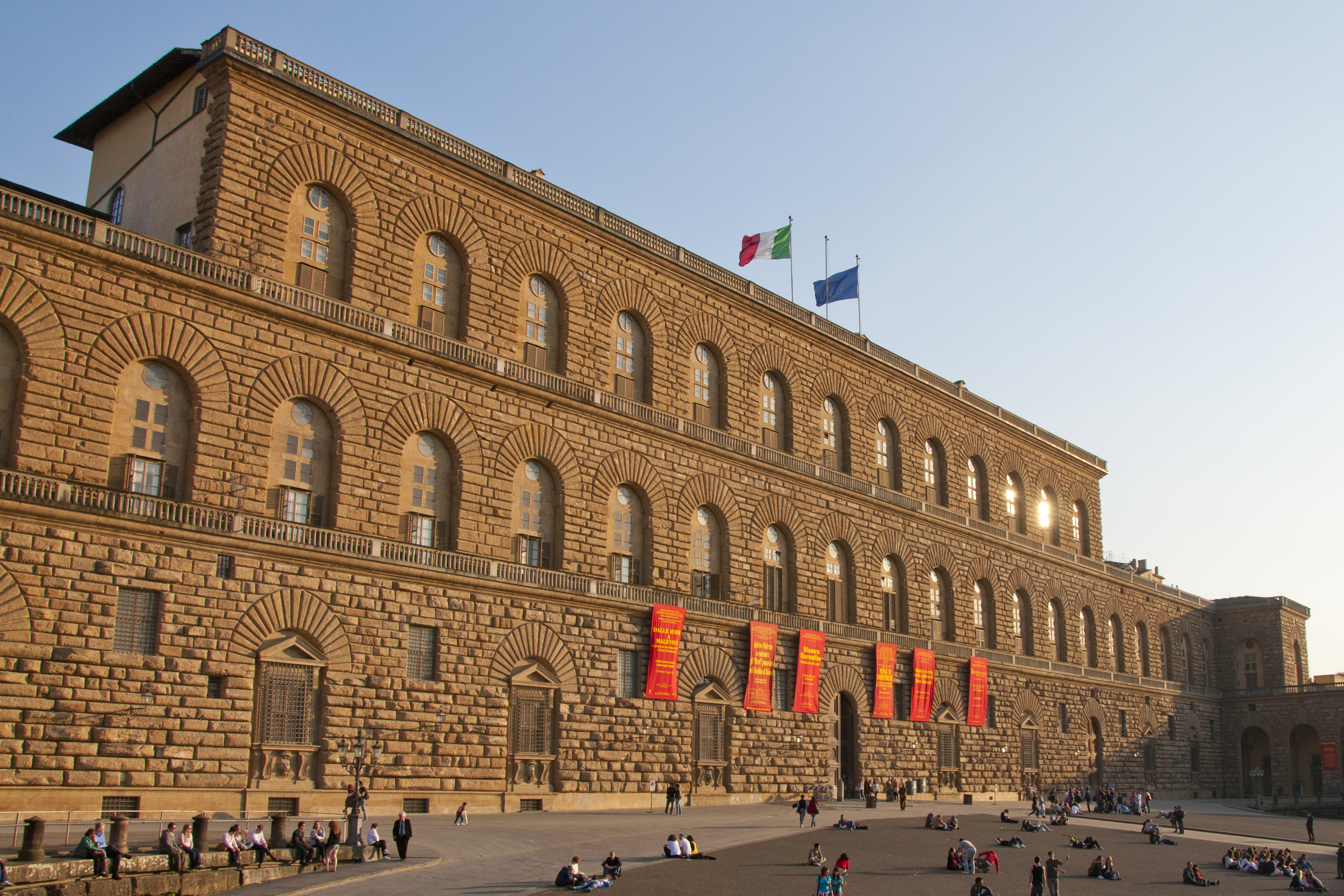
Palazzo Pitti in 2011

The Palazzo Pitti (Italian: [paˈlattso ˈpitti]), in English sometimes called the Pitti Palace, is a vast, mainly in the Renaissance style, palace in Florence, Italy. It is situated on the south side of the River Arno, a short distance from the Ponte Vecchio. The core of the present palazzo dates from 1458 and was originally the town residence of Luca Pitti, an ambitious Florentine banker.

The palace was bought by the Medici family in 1549 and became the chief residence of the ruling family of the Grand Duchy of Tuscany. It grew as a great treasure house, for generations amassing paintings, plates, jewelry and luxurious possessions. The Medici also added the extensive Boboli Gardens to the palace estate.

In the late 18th century, the palazzo was used as a power base by Napoleon during his conquests of Europe. For a brief period, it later served as the principal royal palace of the newly united Italy under the House of Savoy. The palace and its contents were donated to the Italian people by King Victor Emmanuel III in 1919.

The palazzo is now the largest museum complex in Florence. The principal palazzo block, often in a building of this design known as the corps de logis, is 32,000 square metres. It is divided into several principal galleries or museums detailed below.

The Palazzo Pitti is an integral part of the Historic Centre of Florence, which was inscribed as a UNESCO World Heritage Site in 1982. The palace exemplifies Florence's Renaissance heritage and urban continuity.

== History ==
=== Early history ===
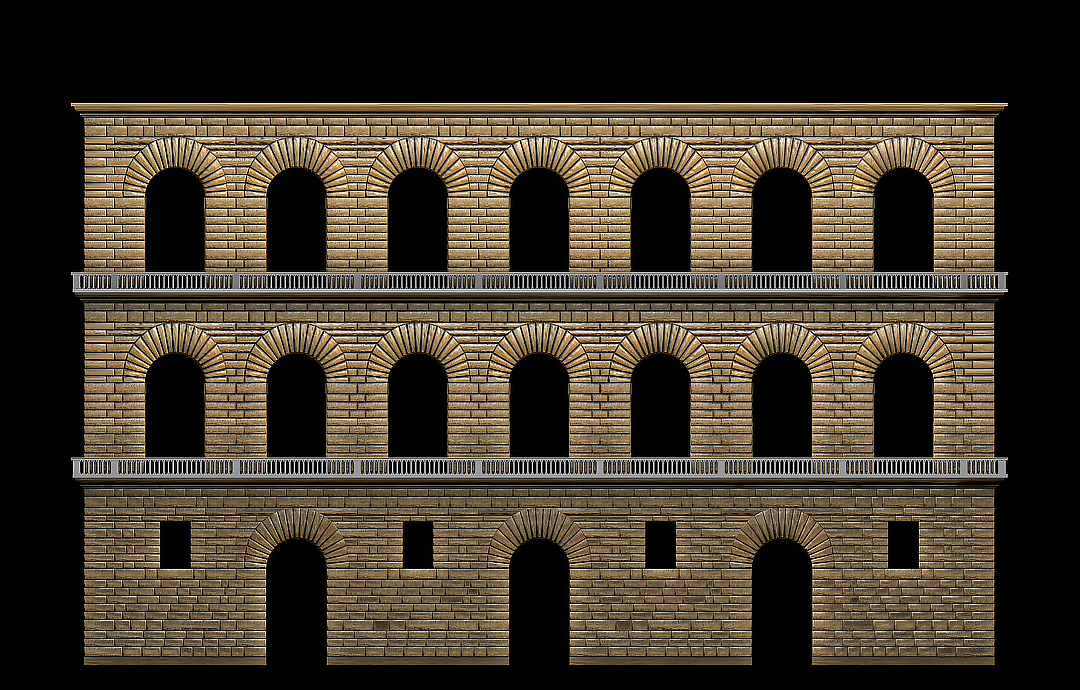
Virtual reconstruction of the fifteenth-century façade of Palazzo Pitti.

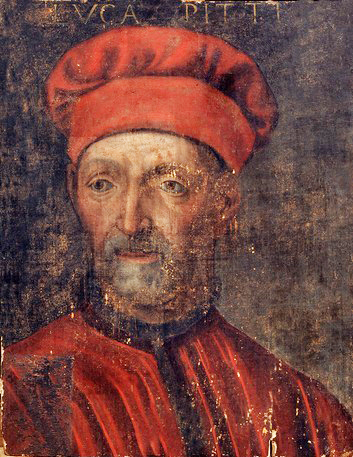
Luca Pitti (1398–1472) began work on the palazzo in 1458.

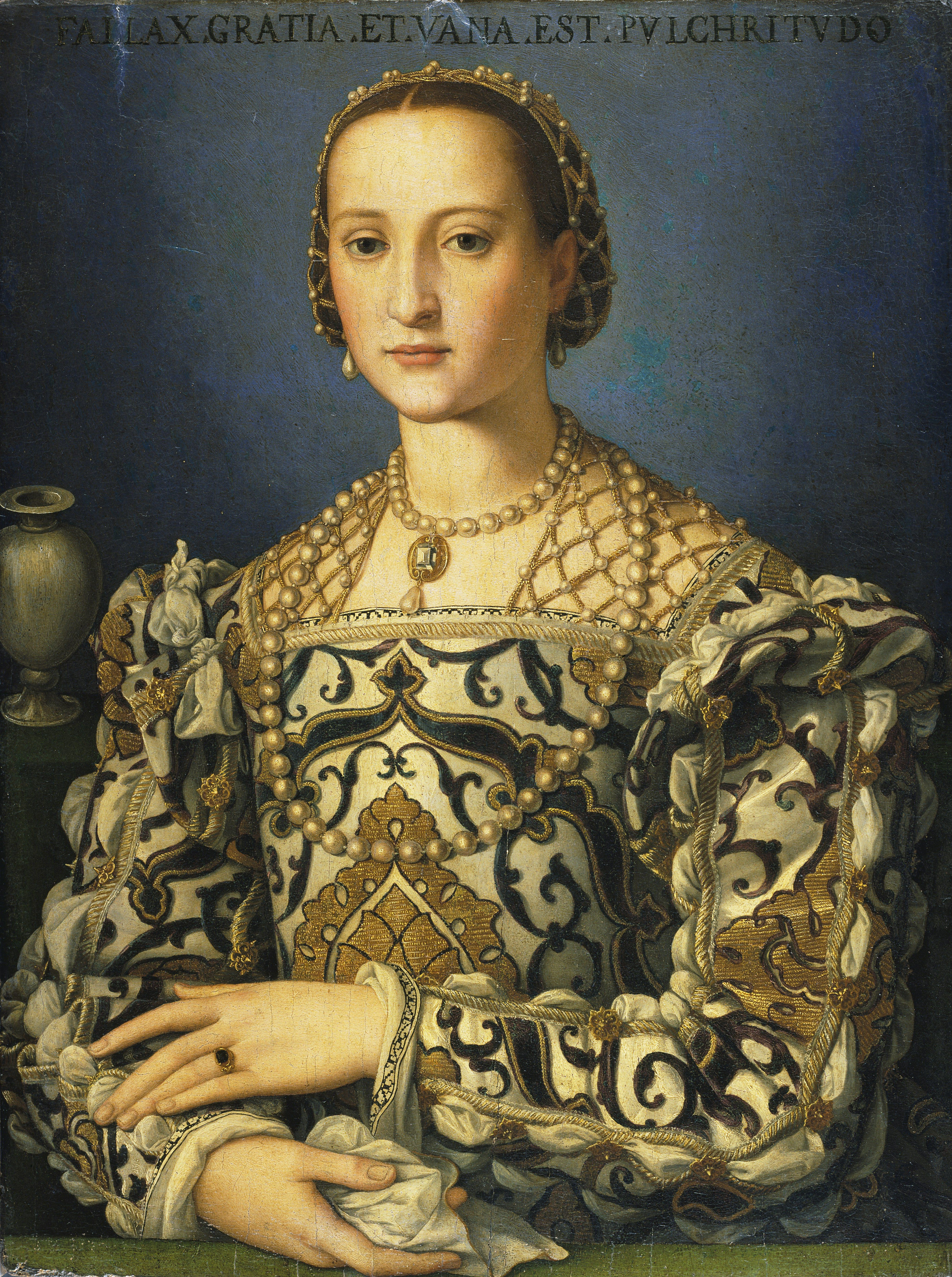
Eleanor of Toledo, Duchess of Florence, bought the palazzo from the Pitti in 1549 for the Medici. Portrait after Bronzino.

The construction of this severe and forbidding building was commissioned in 1458 by the Florentine banker Luca Pitti (1398–1472), a principal supporter and friend of Cosimo de' Medici. The early history of the Palazzo Pitti is a mixture of fact and myth. Pitti is alleged to have instructed that the windows be larger than the entrance of the Palazzo Medici. The 16th-century art historian Giorgio Vasari proposed that Brunelleschi was the palazzo's architect, and that his pupil Luca Fancelli was merely his assistant in the task, but today it is Fancelli who is generally credited. Besides obvious differences from the elder architect's style, Brunelleschi died 12 years before construction of the palazzo began. The design and fenestration suggest that the unknown architect was more experienced in utilitarian domestic architecture than in the humanist rules defined by Alberti in his book De Re Aedificatoria.

Though impressive, the original palazzo would have been no rival to the Florentine Medici residences in terms of either size or content. Whoever the architect of the Palazzo Pitti was, he was moving against the contemporary flow of fashion. The rusticated stonework gives the palazzo a severe and powerful atmosphere, reinforced by the three-times-repeated series of seven arch-headed apertures, reminiscent of a Roman aqueduct. The Roman-style architecture appealed to the Florentine love of the new style all'antica. This original design has withstood the test of time: the repetitive formula of the façade was continued during the subsequent additions to the palazzo, and its influence can be seen in numerous 16th-century imitations and 19th-century revivals. Work stopped after Pitti suffered financial losses following the death of Cosimo de' Medici in 1464. Luca Pitti died in 1472 with the building unfinished.

=== The Medici ===
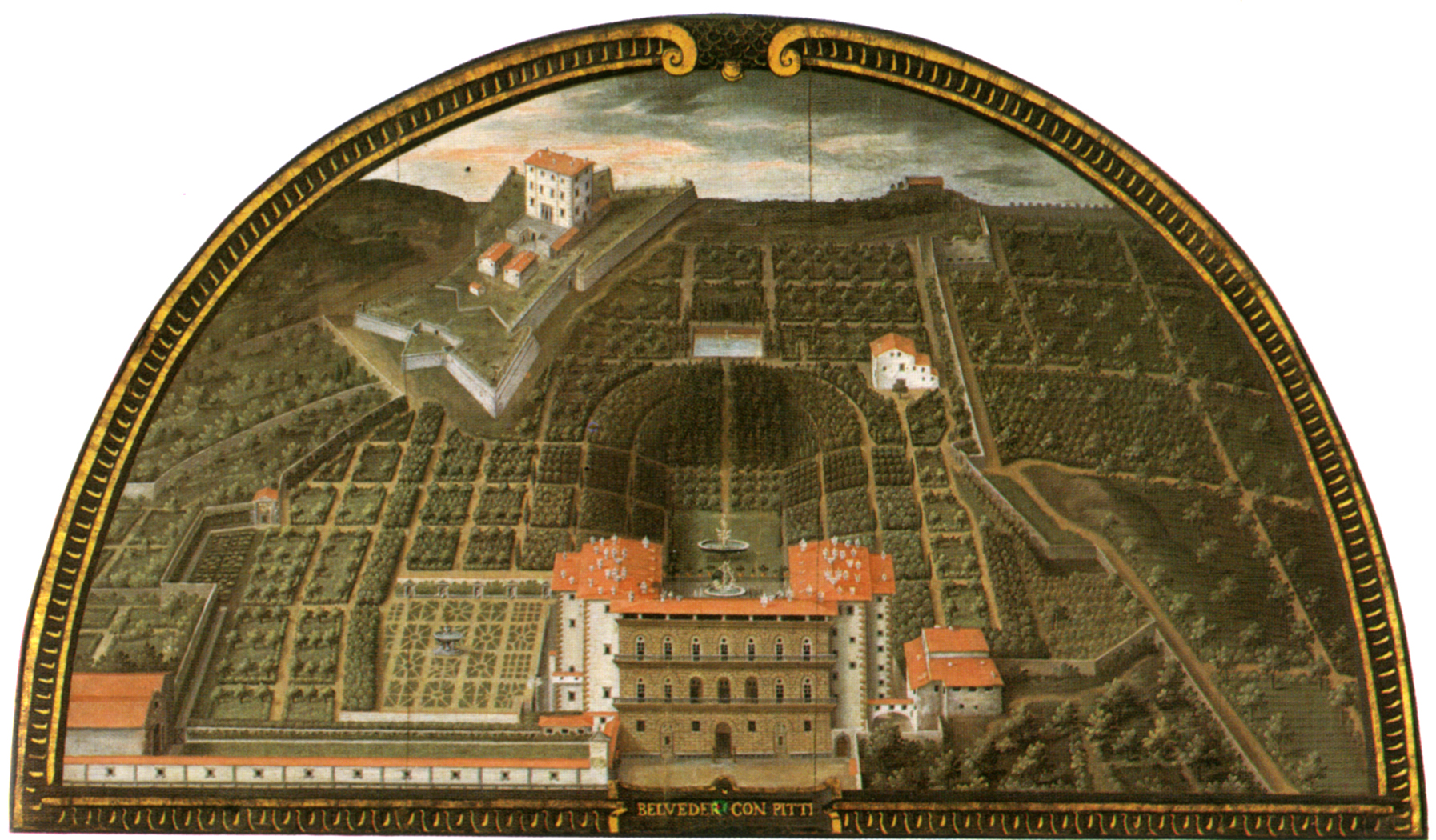
A lunette painted in 1599 by Giusto Utens, depicts the palazzo before its extensions, with the amphitheatre and the Boboli Gardens behind. The red stone excavated from the site was used in extensions to the palazzo.

The building was sold in 1549 to Eleonora di Toledo. Raised at the luxurious court of Naples, Eleonora was the wife of Cosimo I de' Medici of Tuscany, later the Grand Duke. On moving into the palace, Cosimo had Vasari enlarge the structure to fit his tastes; the palace was more than doubled by the addition of a new block along the rear. Vasari also built the Vasari Corridor, an above-ground walkway from Cosimo's old palace and the seat of government, the Palazzo Vecchio, through the Uffizi, above the Ponte Vecchio to the Palazzo Pitti. This enabled the Grand Duke and his family to move easily and safely from their official residence to the Palazzo Pitti. Initially the Palazzo Pitti was used mostly for lodging official guests and for occasional functions of the court, while the Medicis' principal residence remained the Palazzo Vecchio. It was not until the reign of Eleonora's son Francesco I and his wife Johanna of Austria that the palazzo was occupied on a permanent basis and became home to the Medicis' art collection.

Land on the Boboli hill at the rear of the palazzo was acquired in order to create a large formal park and gardens, today known as the Boboli Gardens. The landscape architect employed for this was the Medici court artist Niccolò Tribolo, who died the following year; he was quickly succeeded by Bartolommeo Ammanati. The original design of the gardens centred on an amphitheatre, behind the corps de logis of the palazzo. The first play recorded as performed there was Andria by Terence in 1476. It was followed by many classically inspired plays of Florentine playwrights such as Giovan Battista Cini. Performed for the amusement of the cultivated Medici court, they featured elaborate sets designed by the court architect Baldassarre Lanci.

=== The cortile and extensions ===
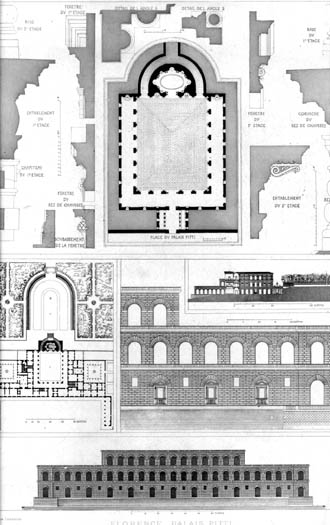
19th-century architectural drawing and plan of the Palazzo Pitti

With the garden project well in hand, Ammanati turned his attentions to creating a large courtyard immediately behind the principal façade, to link the palazzo to its new garden. This courtyard has heavy-banded channelled rustication that has been widely copied, notably for the Parisian palais of Marie de' Medici, the Luxembourg. In the principal façade Ammanati also created the finestre inginocchiate ("kneeling" windows, in reference to their imagined resemblance to a prie-dieu, a device of Michelangelo's), replacing the entrance bays at each end. During the years 1558–70, Ammanati created a monumental staircase to lead with more pomp to the piano nobile, and he extended the wings on the garden front that embraced a courtyard excavated into the steeply sloping hillside at the same level as the piazza in front, from which it was visible through the central arch of the basement. On the garden side of the courtyard Ammanati constructed a grotto, called the "grotto of Moses" on account of the porphyry statue that inhabits it. On the terrace above it, level with the piano nobile windows, Ammanati constructed a fountain centered on the axis; it was later replaced by the Fontana del Carciofo ("Fountain of the Artichoke"), designed by Giambologna's former assistant, Francesco Susini, and completed in 1641.

In 1616, a competition was held to design extensions to the principal urban façade by three bays at either end. Giulio Parigi won the commission; work on the north side began in 1618, and on the south side in 1631 by Alfonso Parigi. During the 18th century, two perpendicular wings were constructed by the architect Giuseppe Ruggeri to enhance and stress the widening of via Romana, which creates a piazza centered on the façade, the prototype of the cour d'honneur that was copied in France. Sporadic lesser additions and alterations were made for many years thereafter under other rulers and architects.

To one side of the gardens is the bizarre grotto designed by Bernardo Buontalenti. The lower façade was begun by Vasari but the architecture of the upper storey is subverted by "dripping" pumice stalactites with the Medici coat of arms at the centre. The interior is similarly poised between architecture and nature; the first chamber has copies of Michelangelo's four unfinished slaves emerging from the corners which seem to carry the vault with an open oculus at its centre and painted as a rustic bower with animals, figures and vegetation. Figures, animals and trees made of stucco and rough pumice adorn the lower walls. A short passage leads to a small second chamber and to a third which has a central fountain with Giambologna's Venus in the centre of the basin, peering fearfully over her shoulder at the four satyrs spitting jets of water at her from the edge.

=== Houses of Lorraine and Savoy ===
The palazzo remained the principal Medici residence until Gian Gastone de' Medici, Grand Duke of Tuscany, the last of the male Medici line, died in 1737. It was then occupied briefly by his sister, the elderly Electress Palatine; on her death, the Medici dynasty became extinct and the palazzo passed to the new Grand Dukes of Tuscany, the Austrian House of Habsburg-Lorraine, in the person of Francis III. The Austrian tenancy was briefly interrupted by Napoleon, who used the palazzo during his period of control over Italy.

When Tuscany passed from the House of Habsburg-Lorraine to the House of Savoy in 1860, the Palazzo Pitti was included. After the Risorgimento, when Florence was briefly the capital of the Kingdom of Italy, Victor Emmanuel II resided in the palazzo until 1871. His grandson, Victor Emmanuel III, presented the palazzo to the nation in 1919. The palazzo and other buildings in the Boboli Gardens were then divided into five separate art galleries and a museum, housing not only many of its original contents, but priceless artefacts from many other collections acquired by the state. The 140 rooms open to the public are part of an interior, which is in large part a later product than the original portion of the structure, mostly created in two phases, one in the 17th century and the other in the early 18th century. Some earlier interiors remain, and there are still later additions such as the Throne Room. In 2005 the surprise discovery of forgotten 18th-century bathrooms in the palazzo revealed remarkable examples of contemporary plumbing very similar in style to the bathrooms of the 21st century.

== Palatine Gallery ==
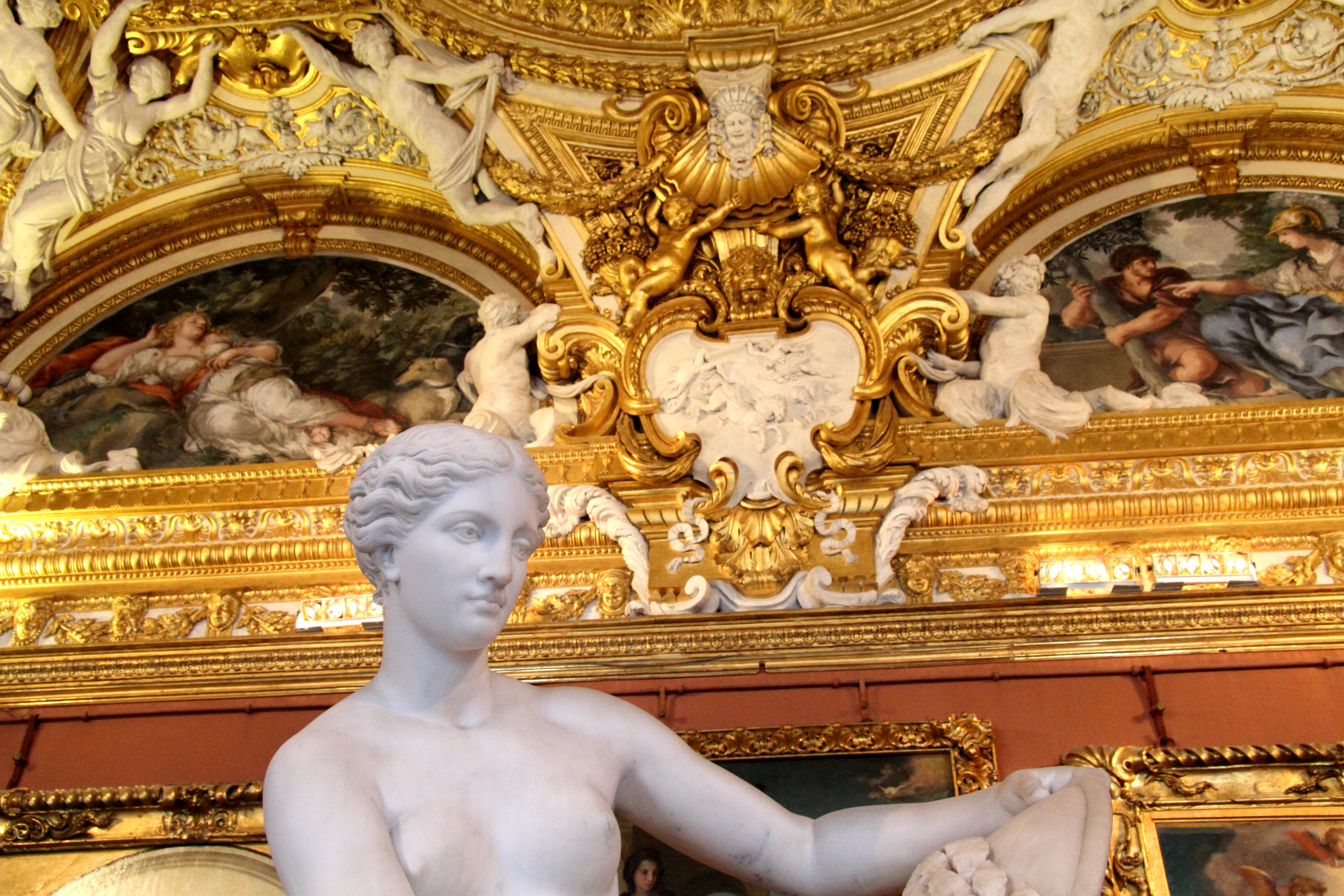
Cornice of the Jupiter Room, showing lunette frescoes and stucco work by Pietro da Cortona

The Palatine Gallery, the main gallery of Palazzo Pitti, contains a large ensemble of over 500 principally Renaissance paintings, which were once part of the Medicis' and their successors' private art collection. The gallery, which overflows into the royal apartments, contains works by Raphael, Titian, Perugino (Lamentation over the Dead Christ), Correggio, Peter Paul Rubens, and Pietro da Cortona. The character of the gallery is still that of a private collection, and the works of art are displayed and hung much as they would have been in the grand rooms for which they were intended rather than following a chronological sequence, or arranged according to school of art.

The finest rooms were decorated by Pietro da Cortona in the high baroque style. Initially Cortona frescoed a small room on the piano nobile called the Sala della Stufa with a series depicting the Four Ages of Man which were very well received; the Age of Gold and Age of Silver were painted in 1637, followed in 1641 by the Age of Bronze and Age of Iron. They are regarded among his masterpieces. The artist was subsequently asked to fresco the grand ducal reception rooms; a suite of five rooms at the front of the palazzo. In these five Planetary Rooms, the hierarchical sequence of the deities is based on Ptolomeic cosmology; Venus, Apollo, Mars, Jupiter (the Medici Throne room) and Saturn, but minus Mercury and the Moon which should have come before Venus. These highly ornate ceilings with frescoes and elaborate stucco work essentially celebrate the Medici lineage and the bestowal of virtuous leadership. Cortona left Florence in 1647, and his pupil and collaborator, Ciro Ferri, completed the cycle by the 1660s. They were to inspire the later Planet Rooms at Louis XIV's Palace of Versailles, designed by Charles Le Brun.

The collection was first opened to the public in the late 18th century, albeit rather reluctantly, by Grand Duke Leopold I, Tuscany's first enlightened ruler, keen to obtain popularity after the demise of the Medici.

=== Rooms of the Palatine Gallery ===
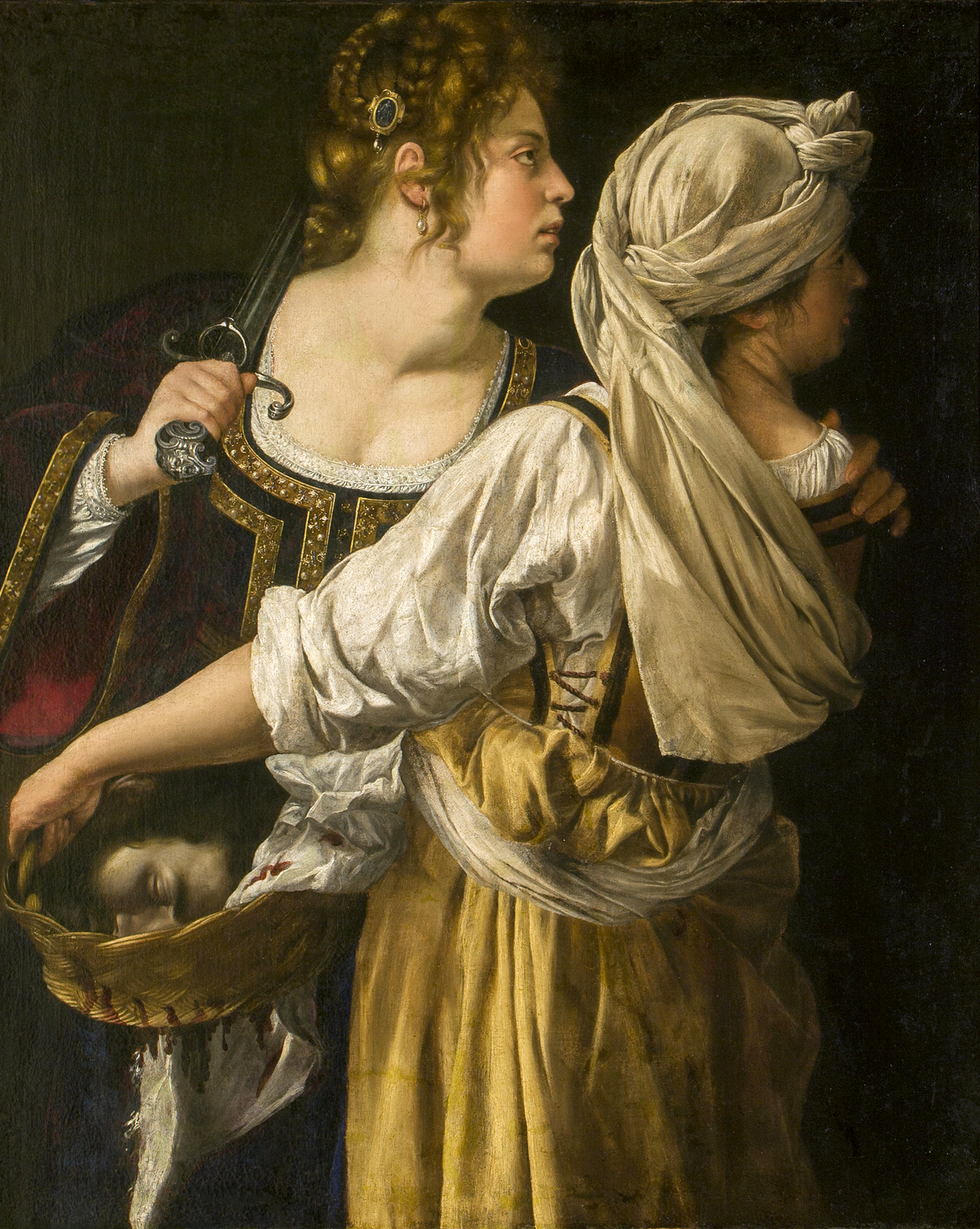
Artemisia Gentileschi, Judith and Her Maidservant with the Head of Holofernes (1613–1618)

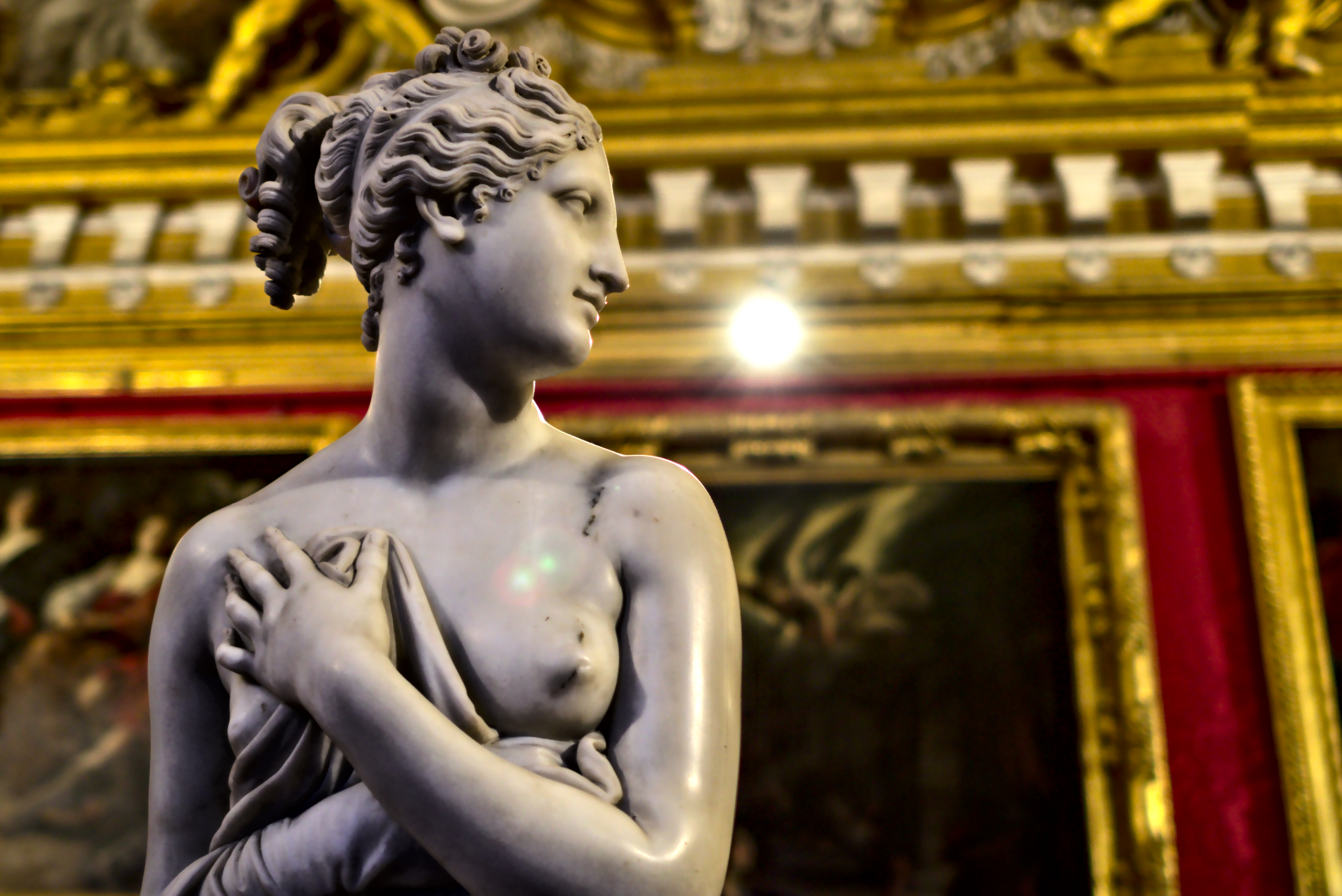
Close-up of Canova's Venus Italica (1810) as seen in the Room of Venus

The Palatine Gallery has 28 rooms, among them the following:

- Room of Castagnoli: named after the painter of the ceiling frescoes. In this room are displayed portraits of the Medici and Lorraine ruling families, and the Table of the Muses, a masterwork of stone-inlaid table made by the Opificio delle Pietre Dure between 1837 and 1851.
- Room of the Ark: contains a painting by Giovan Battista Caracciolo (17th century). In 1816, the ceiling was frescoed by Luigi Ademollo with the Transportation of the Ark of the Covenant Containing the Tablets of the Law.
- Room of Psyche: named after ceiling frescoes by Giuseppe Collignon; it contains paintings by Salvator Rosa from 1640–1650.
- Hall of Poccetti: the frescoes on the vault were once ascribed to Bernardino Poccetti, but are now attributed to Matteo Rosselli. In the center of the hall is a table (1716) commissioned by Cosimo III. In the hall are also some works by Rubens and Pontormo.
- Room of Prometheus: named after the subject of the frescoes by Collignon (19th century), it contains a large collection of tondi (circular paintings); among them are the Bartolini Tondo by Filippo Lippi (15th century), two portraits by Botticelli and paintings by Pontormo and Domenico Beccafumi.
- Room of Justice: has a ceiling frescoed by Antonio Fedi (1771–1843), and displays portraits (16th century) by Titian, Tintoretto and Paolo Veronese.
- Room of Ulysses: frescoed in 1815 by Gaspare Martellini, it contains early works by Filippino Lippi and Raphael.
- Room of the Iliad: contains the Panciatichi Assumption and the Passerini Assumption (c. 1522–1523 and 1526 respectively) by Andrea del Sarto, and paintings by Artemisia Gentileschi (17th century).
- Room of Saturn: contains the Portrait of Agnolo Doni (1506), the Madonna della Seggiola (1516), and the Portrait of Tommaso Inghirami (1516) by Raphael; it also contains an Annunciation (1528) by Andrea del Sarto, and Christ and the Evangelists (1516) by Fra Bartolomeo.
- Room of Jupiter: contains La Velata, the famous portrait by Raphael (1516) which, according to Giorgio Vasari, represents the artist's lover. Among the other works in the room are paintings by Rubens, Andrea del Sarto and Perugino.
- Room of Mars: contains allegorical paintings by Rubens of the Consequences of War (hence the name of the room) and the Four Philosophers (among them Rubens portrayed himself, on the left). On the vault is a fresco by Pietro da Cortona, the Triumph of the Medici.
- Room of Apollo: contains a Madonna and Child with Saints (1522) by Rosso Fiorentino, originally from the Church of Santo Spirito, and two paintings by Titian: the Penitent Magdalene and the Portrait of a Young Englishman (between 1530 and 1540).
- Room of Venus: contains the Venus Italica (1810) by Antonio Canova, commissioned by Napoleon. On the walls are landscapes (1640–1650) by Salvator Rosa and four paintings by Titian, 1510–1545. Among the Titian paintings is a Portrait of Pope Julius II (1545) and La Bella (1535).
- White Hall: once the ball room of the palace, is characterized by the white decorations and is often used for temporary exhibitions.

The Royal Apartments include 14 rooms. They were redecorated in the Empire style by the Savoy monarchs, but there are still some rooms retaining decorations and furniture from the age of the Medici.

The Green Room was frescoed by Castagnoli in the early 19th century. It exhibits an intarsia cabinet from the 17th century and a collection of gilded bronzes; the throne room was decorated for King Victor Emmanuel II of Italy and is characterized by the red brocade on the walls and by the Japanese and Chinese vases (17th–18th centuries).

The Blue Room contains furniture from the 17th–18th centuries and portraits of members of the Medici family by Justus Sustermans (1597–1681).

=== Principal works of art ===
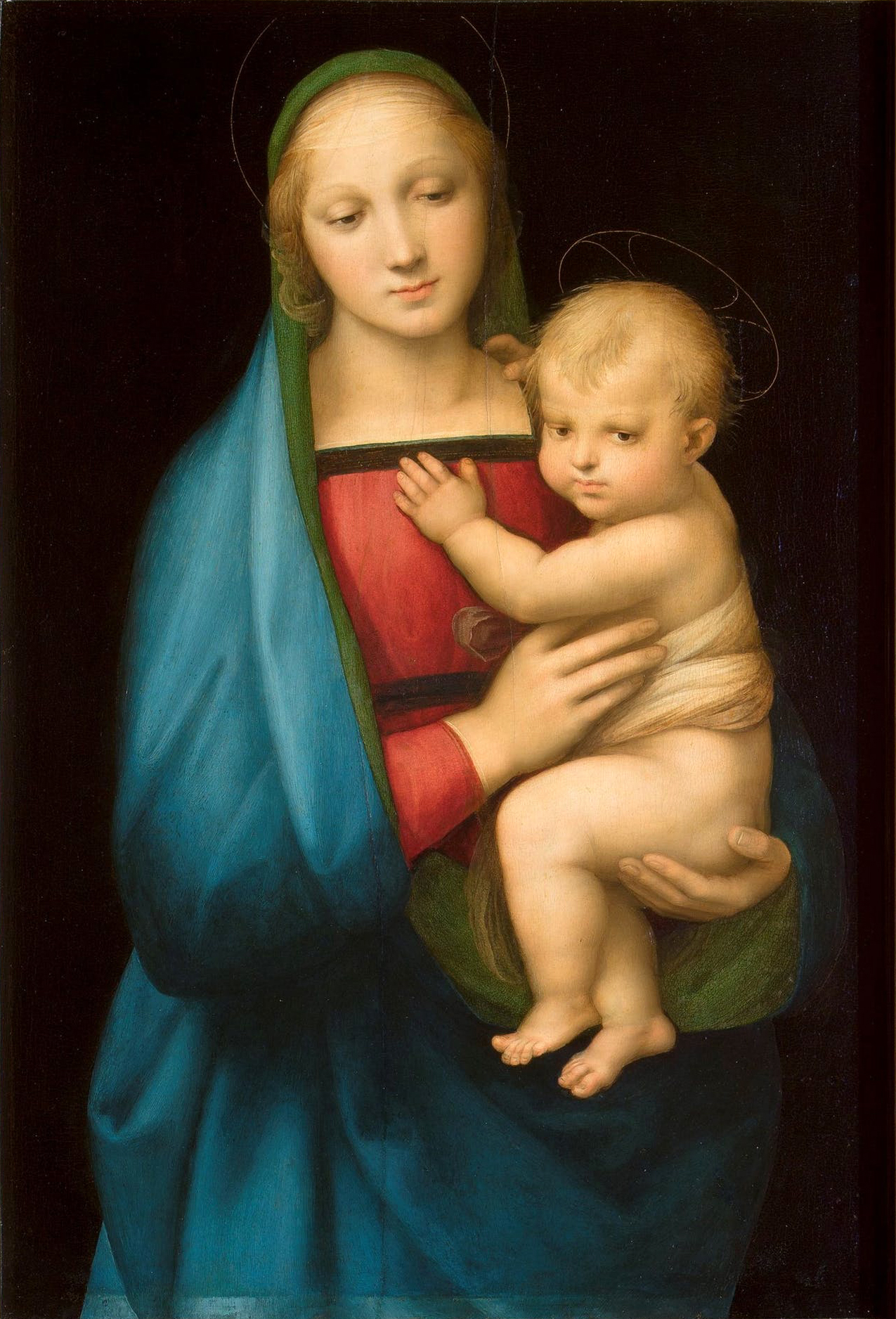
Raphael
Madonna del Granduca. 84 × 55 cm.

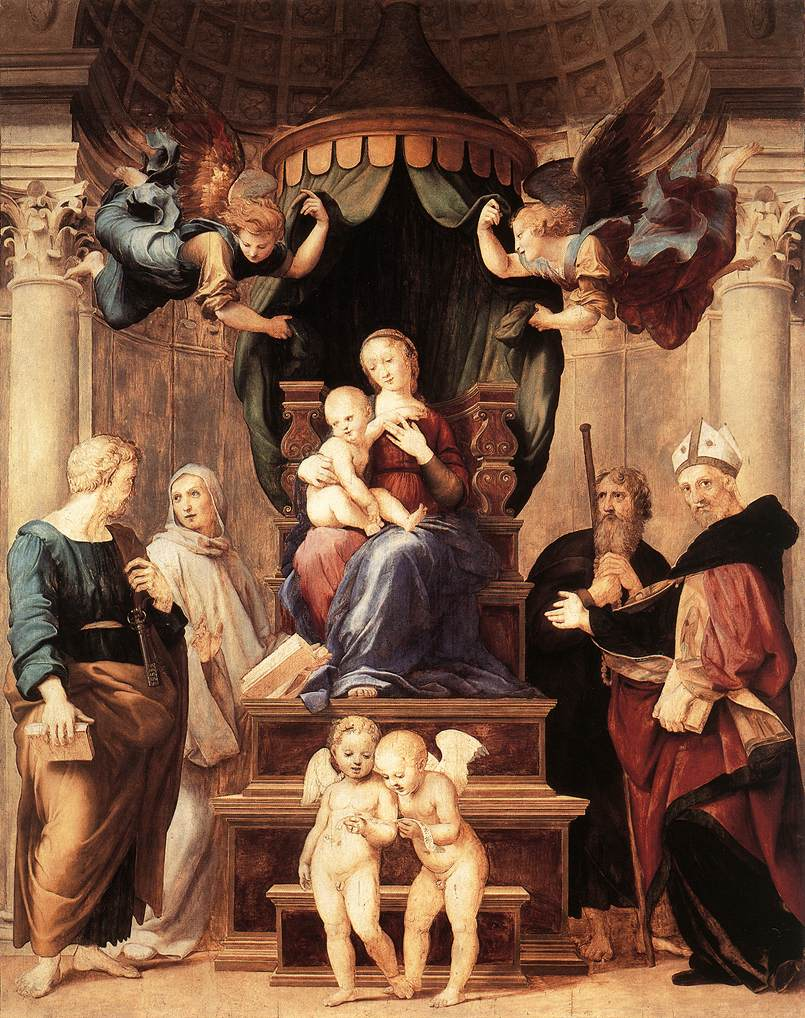
Raphael
Madonna of the Canopy. 276 × 224 cm.

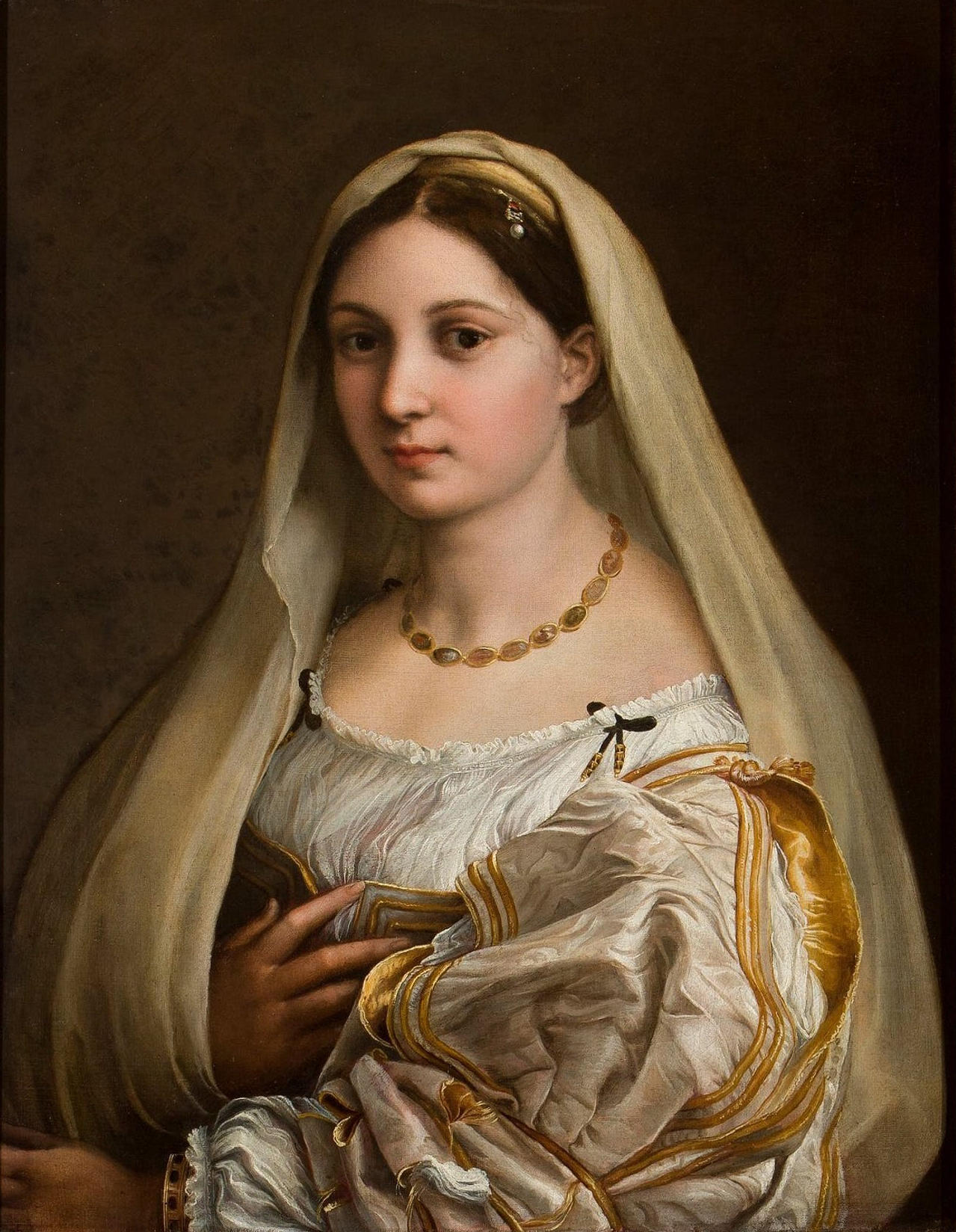
Raphael
Woman with a Veil. 82 × 60 cm.

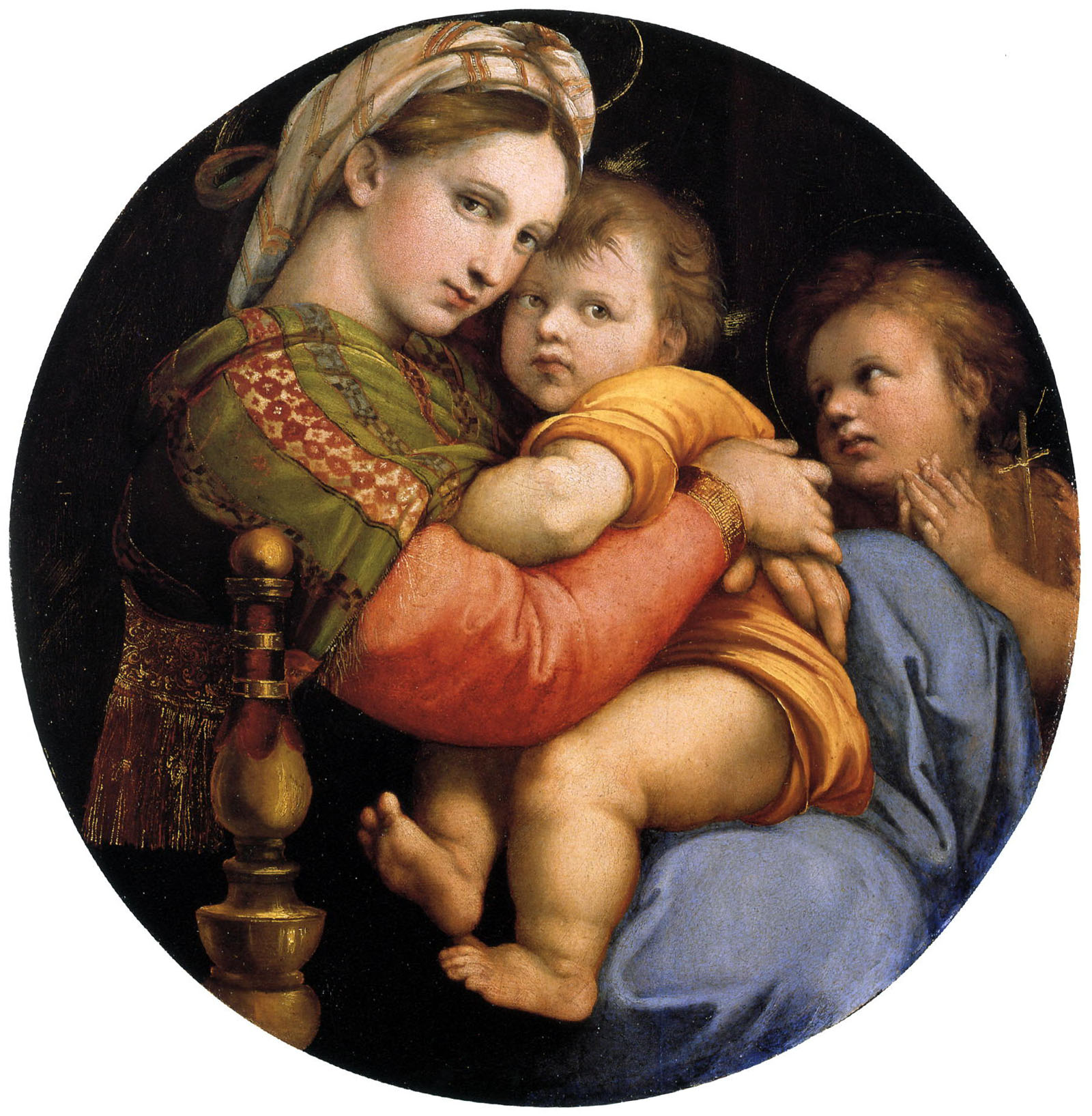
Raphael
Madonna della Seggiola. Diameter 71 cm.

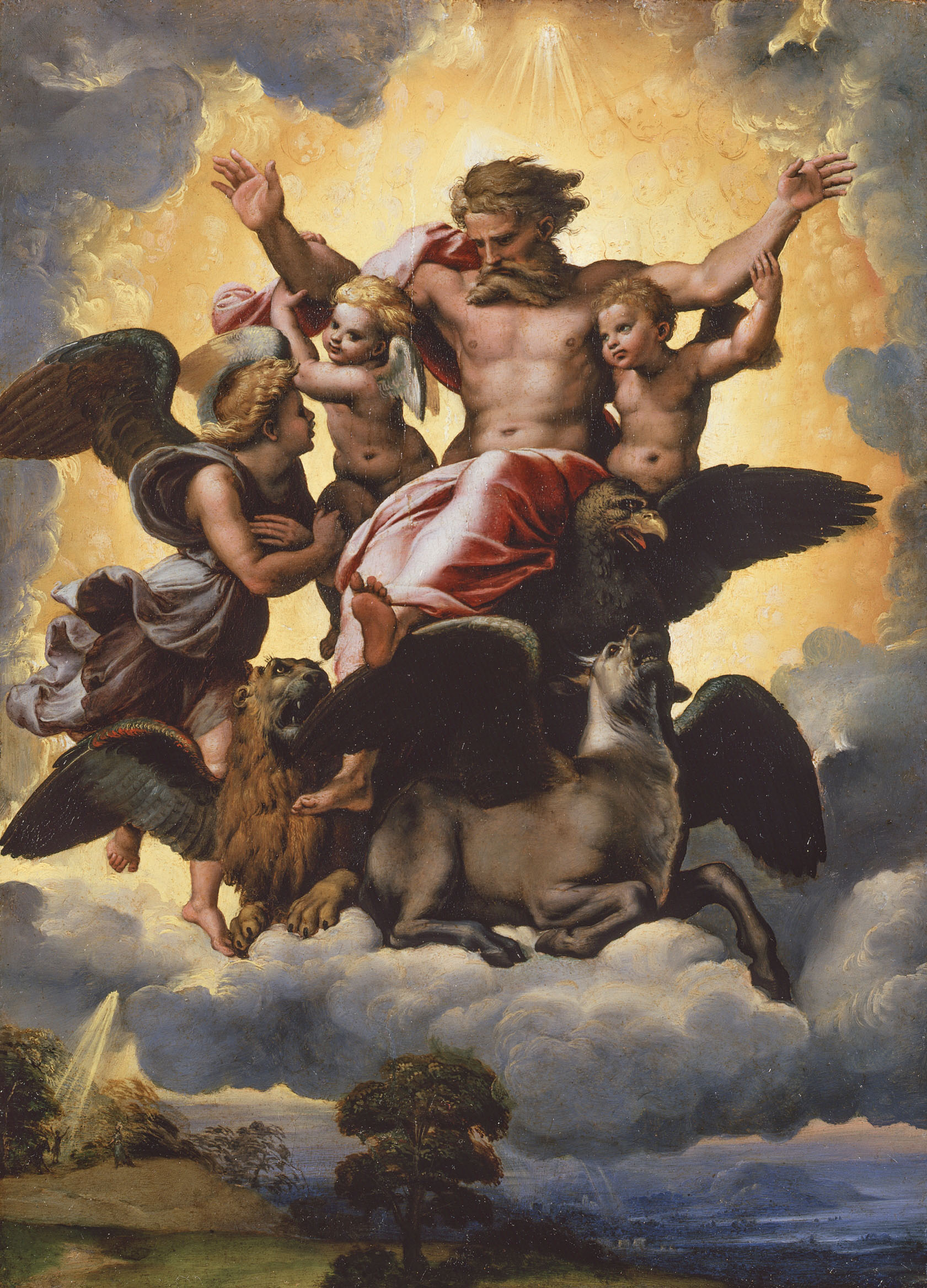
Raphael
Vision of Ezekiel. 41 × 30 cm.

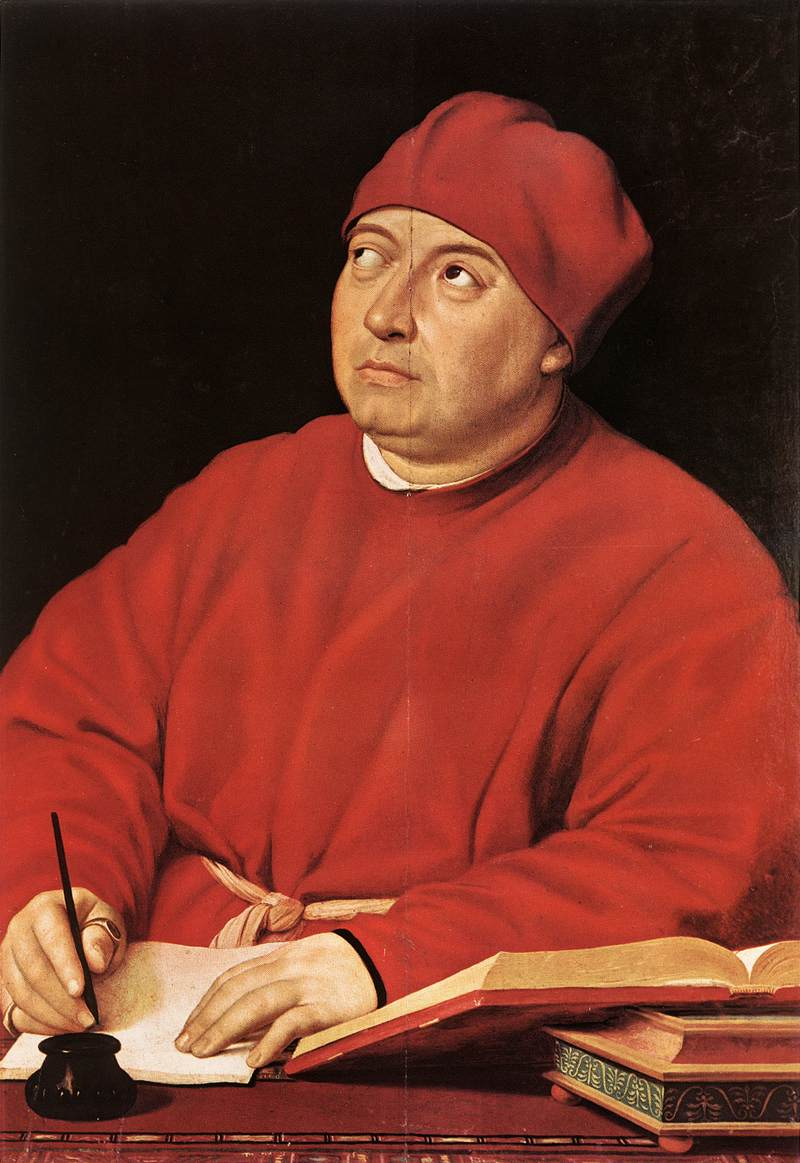
Raphael
Portrait of Tommaso Inghirami. 90 × 62 cm.

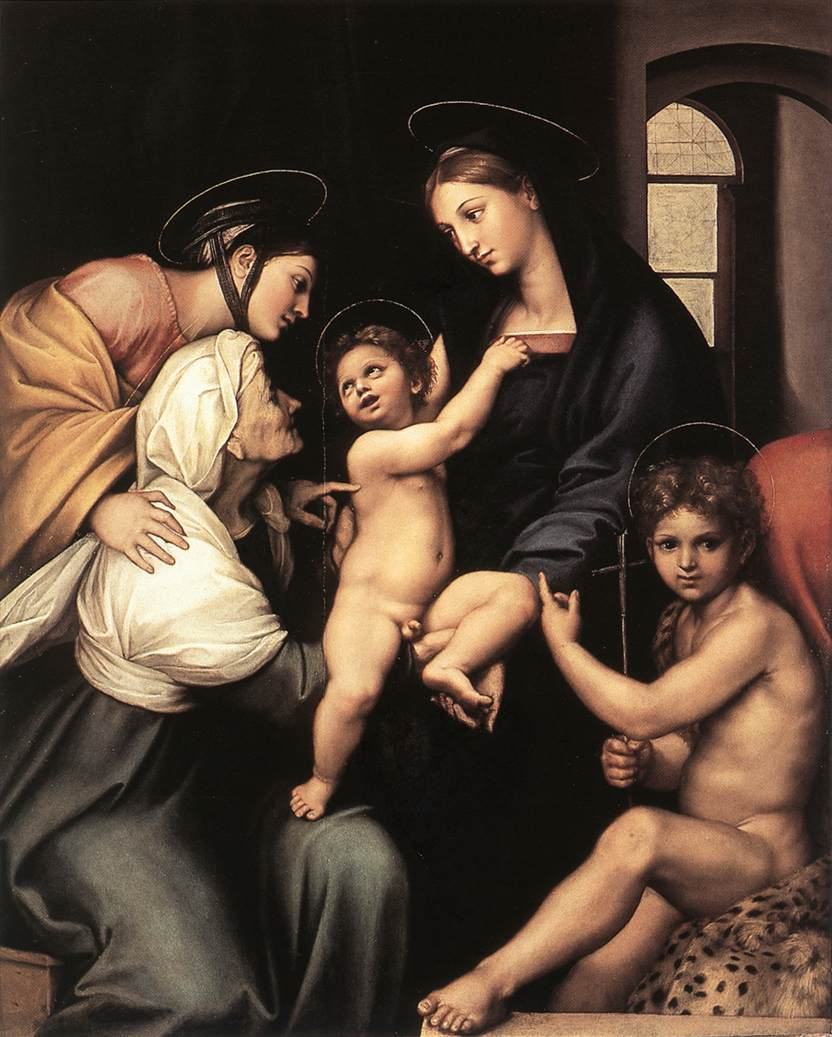
Raphael and Assistants
Madonna dell'Impannata. 158 × 125 cm.

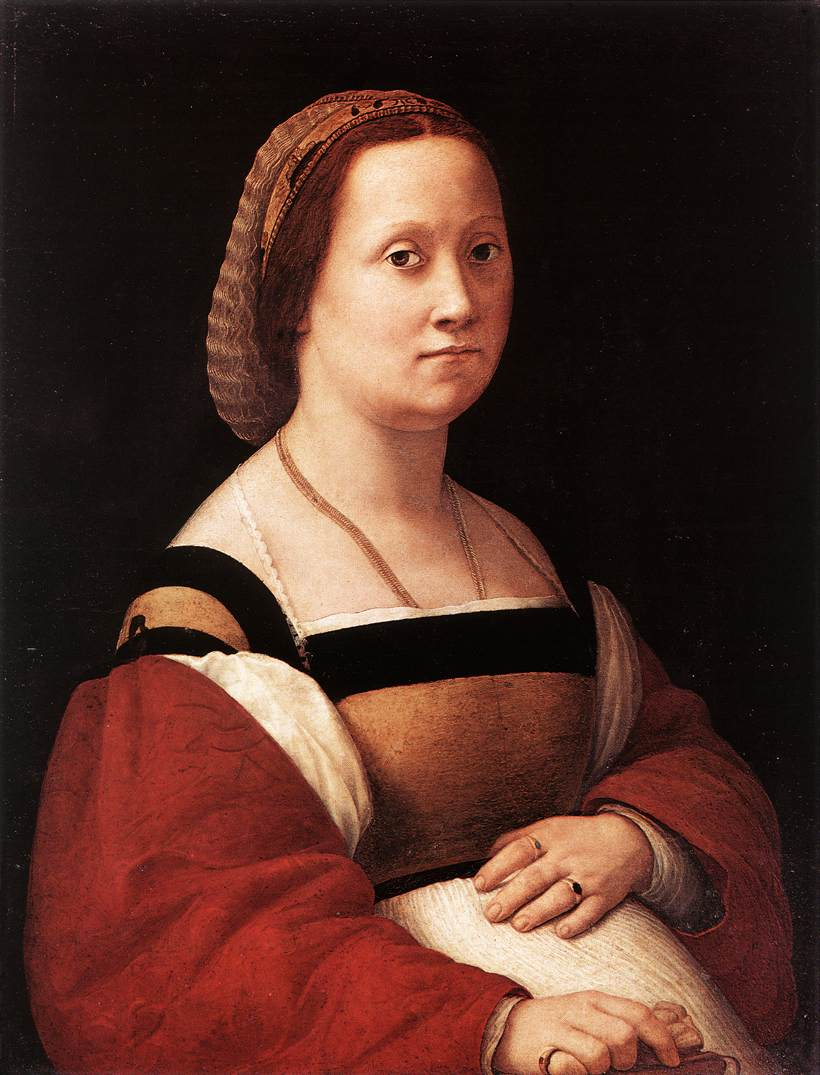
Raphael
La Donna Gravida. 66 × 52 cm.

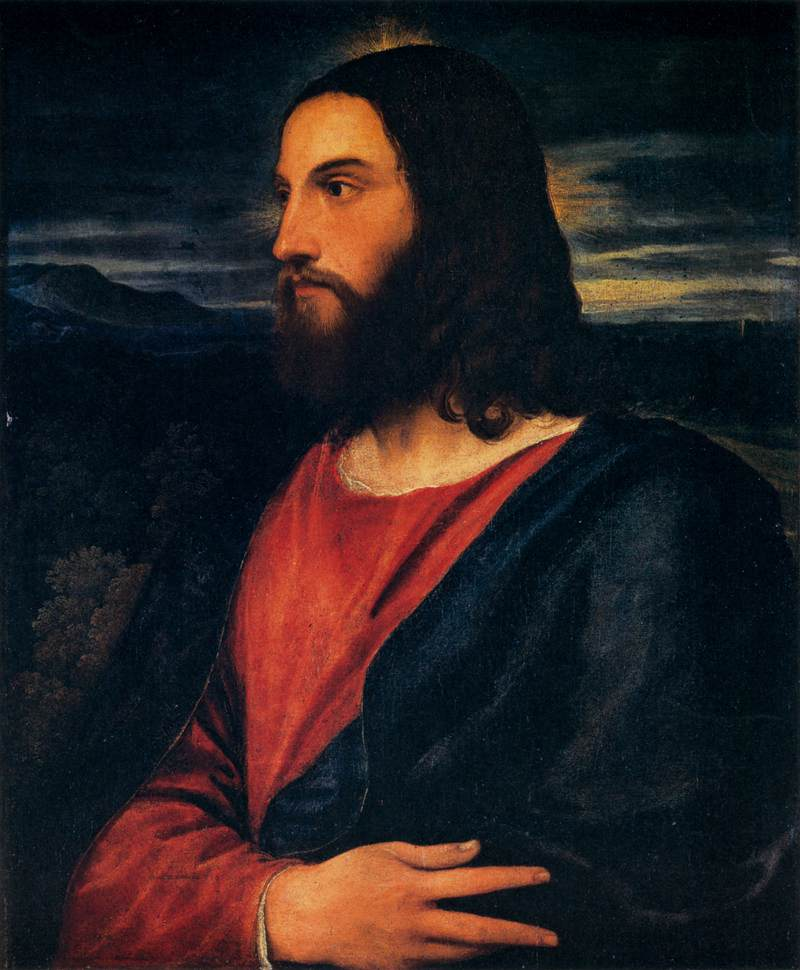
Titian
Christ the Redeemer. 78 × 55 cm.

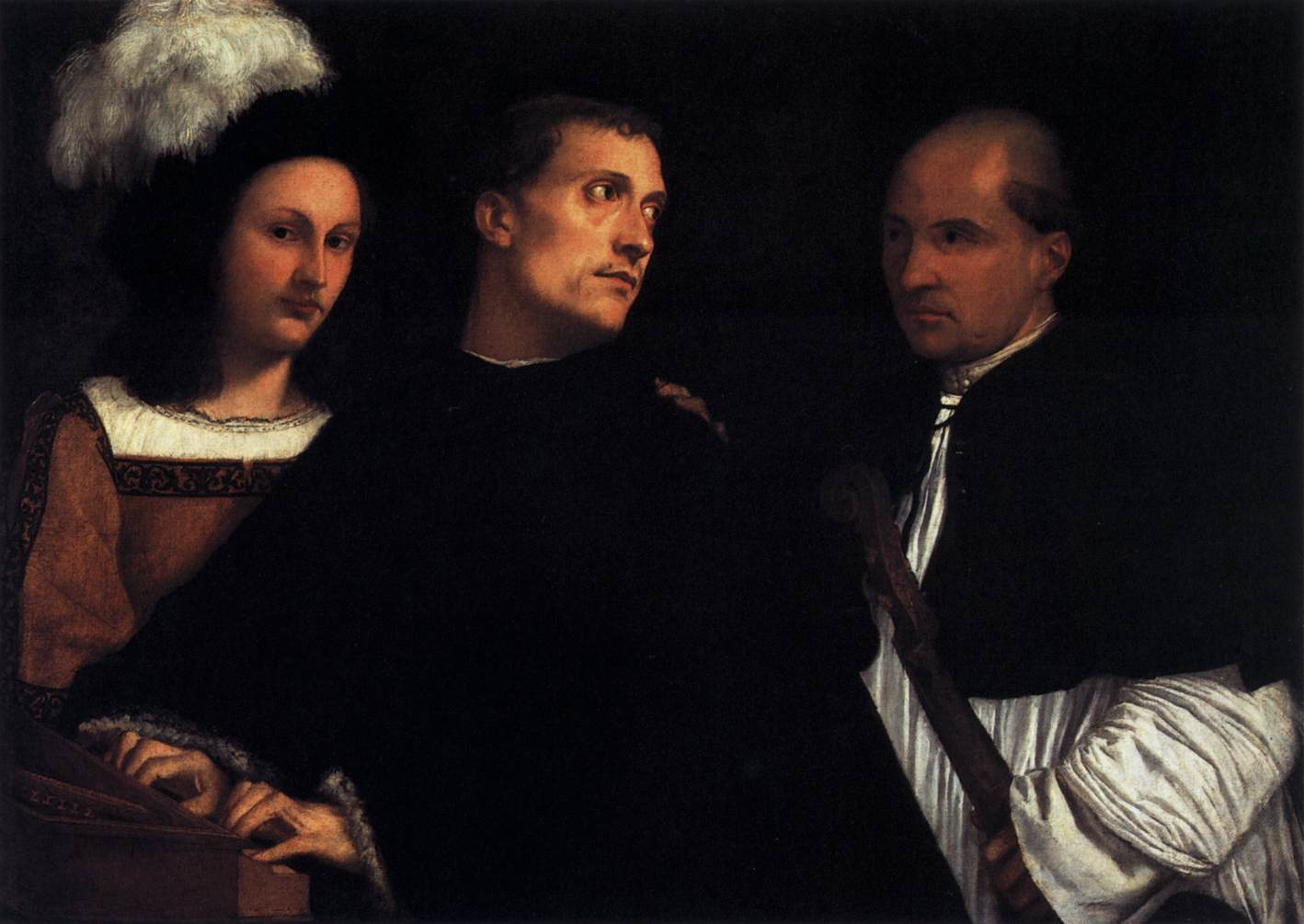
Titian
The Concert. 87 × 124 cm.

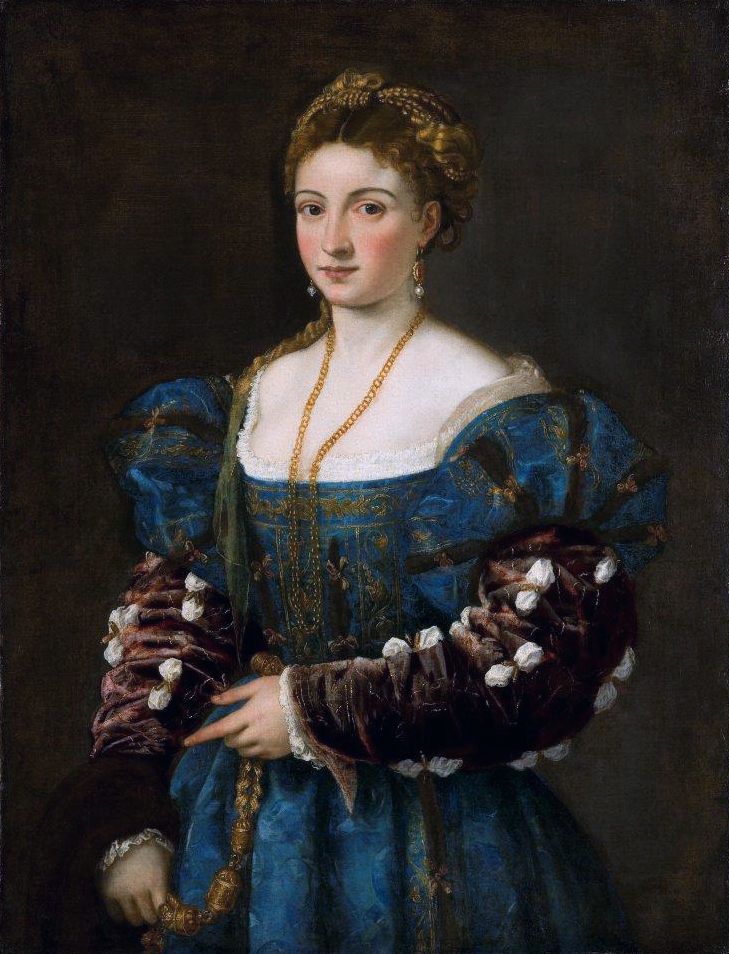
Titian
La Bella. 100 × 75 cm.

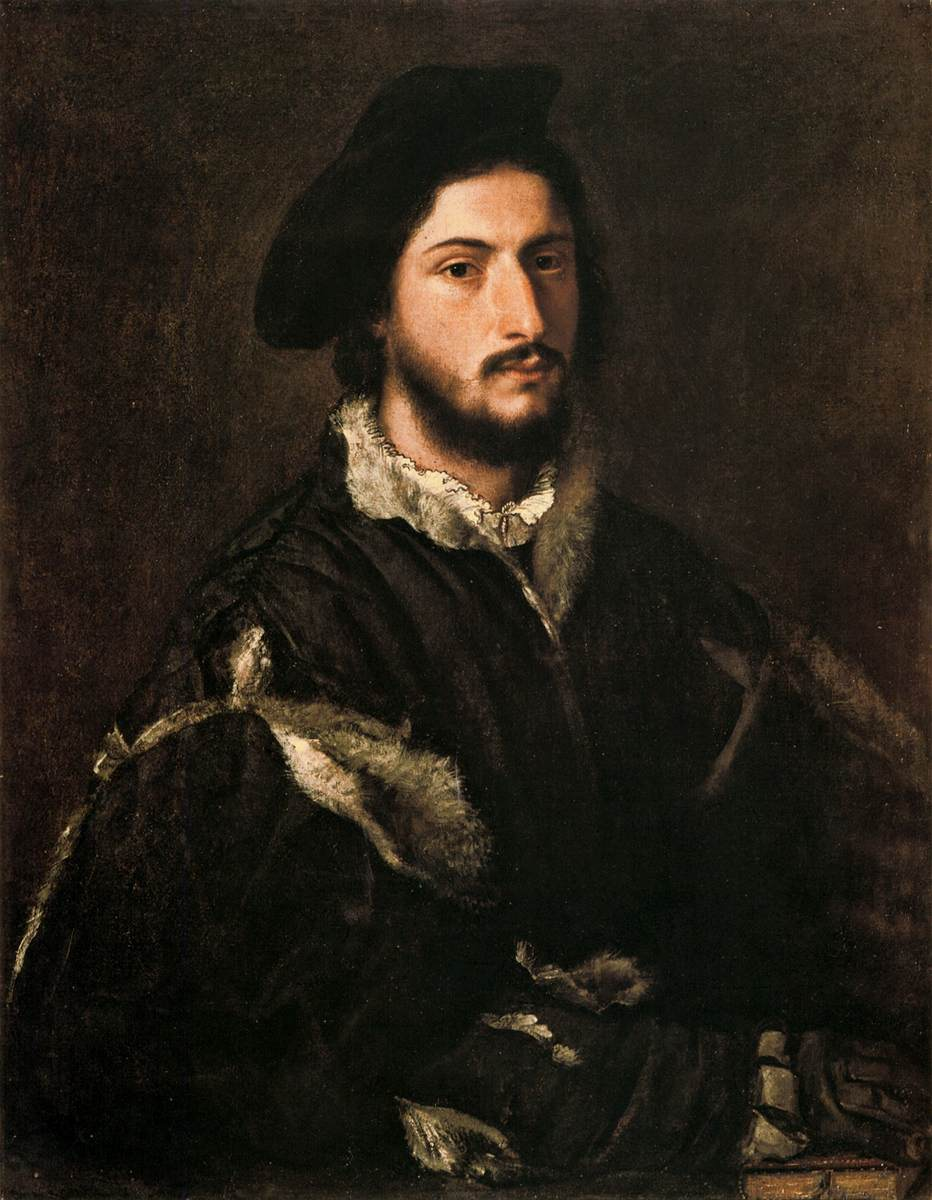
Titian
Portrait of Vincenzo Mosti. 85 × 67 cm.

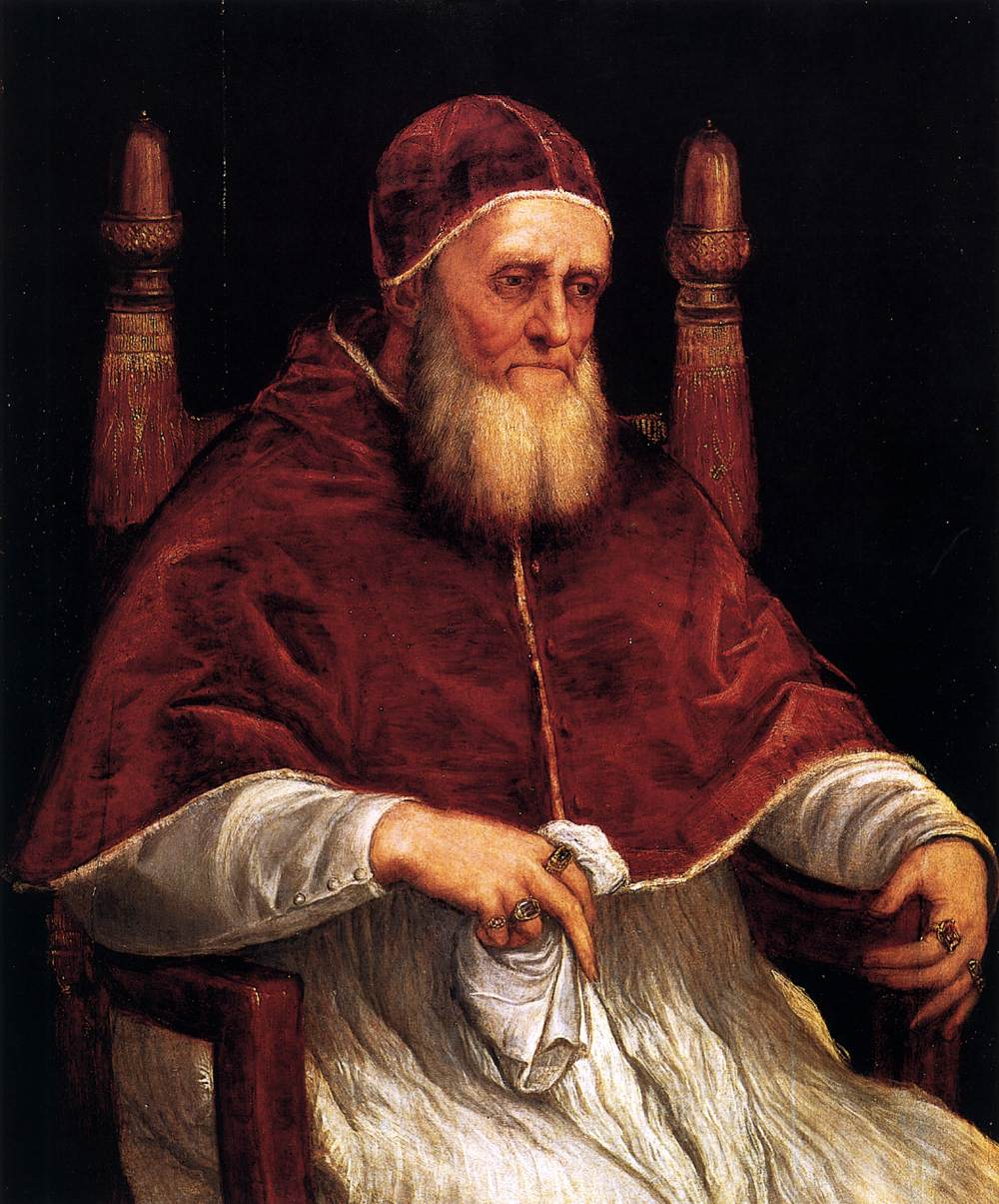
Titian
Portrait of Pope Julius II. 99 × 82 cm.

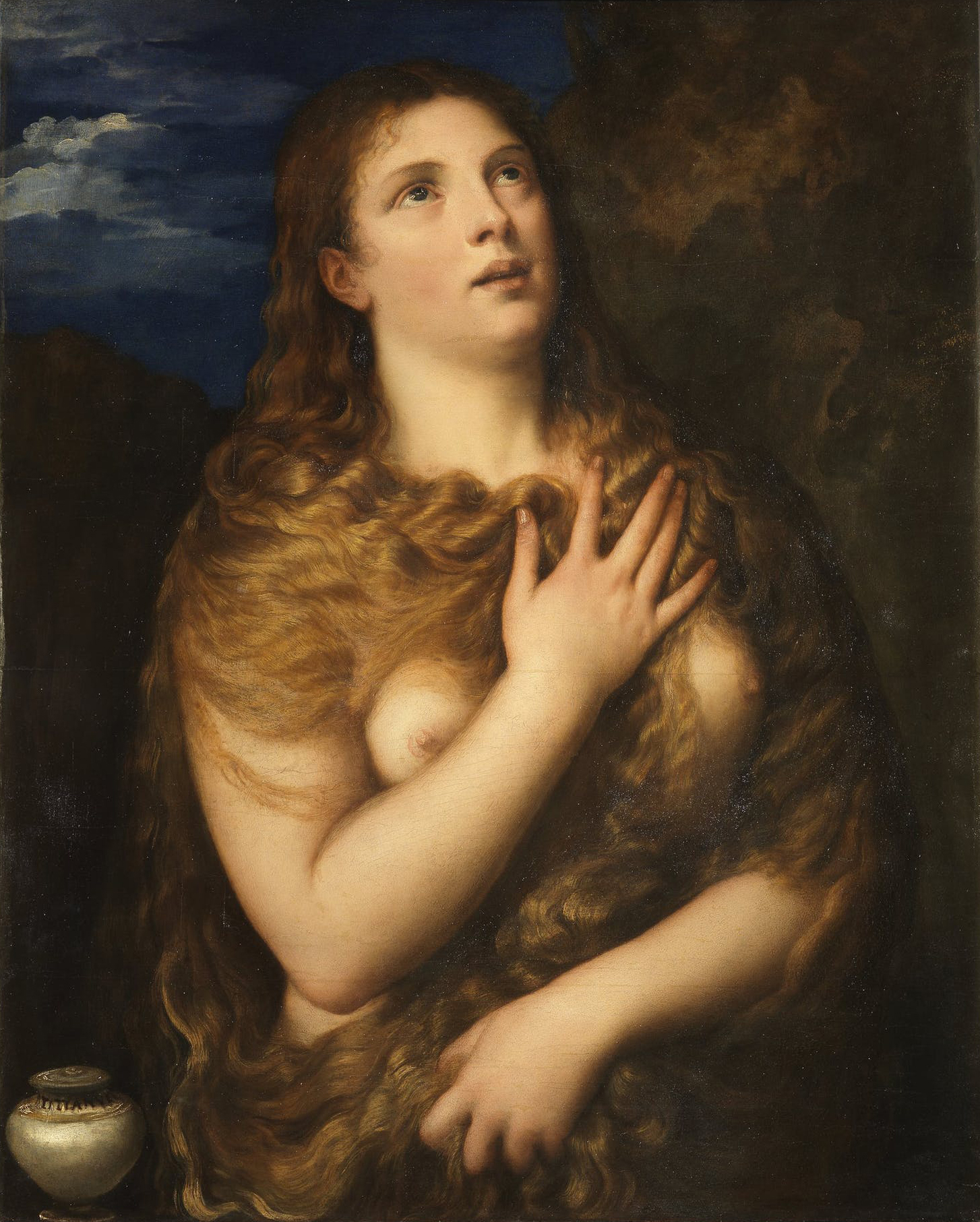
Titian
Penitent Magdalene. 84 × 69 cm.

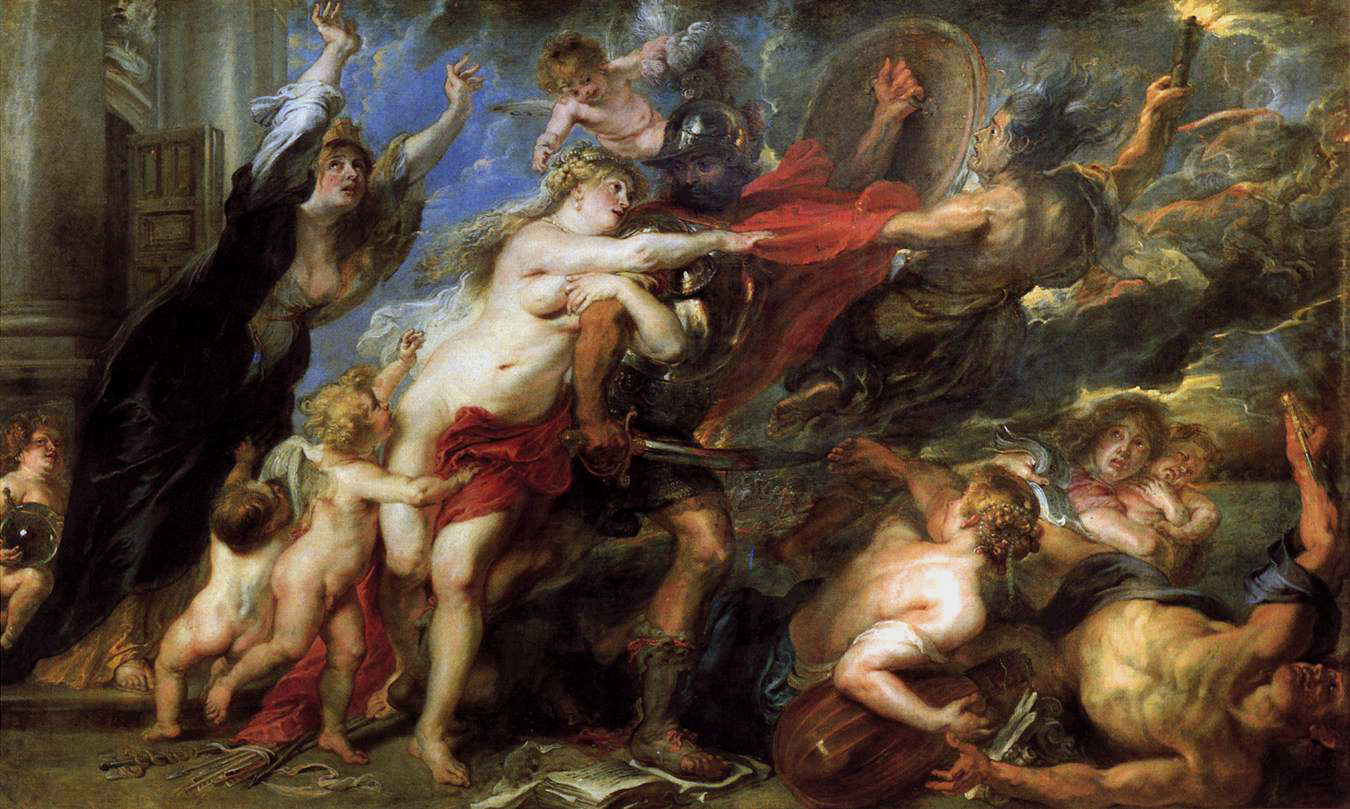
Peter Paul Rubens
Consequences of War. 206 × 342 cm.

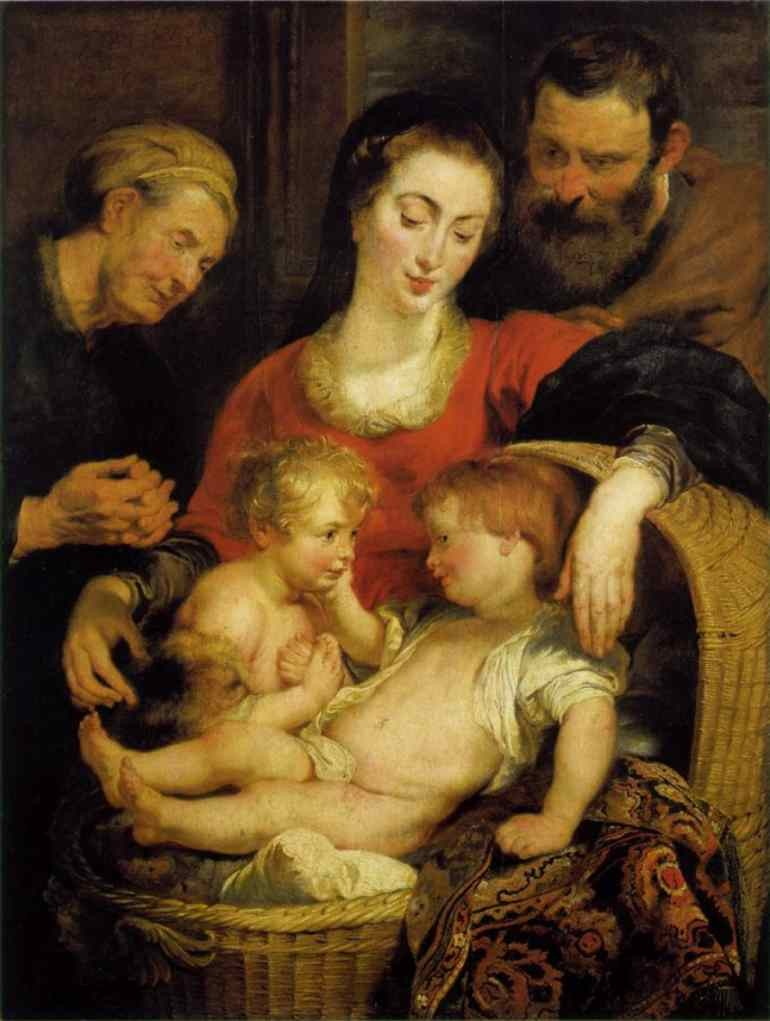
Peter Paul Rubens
Madonna of the Basket. 114 × 80 cm.

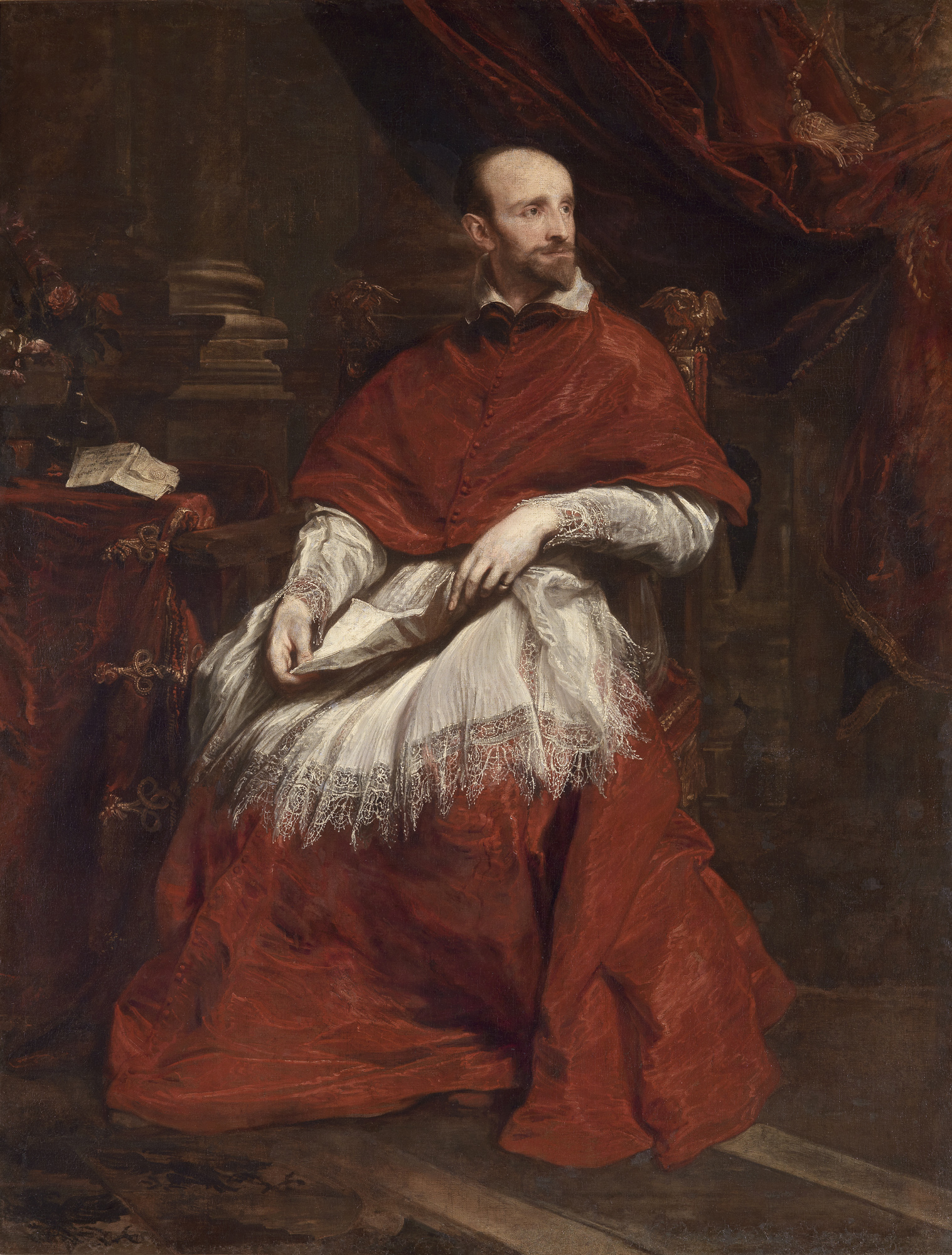
Anthony van Dyck
Portrait of Cardinal Guido Bentivoglio. 195 × 147 cm.

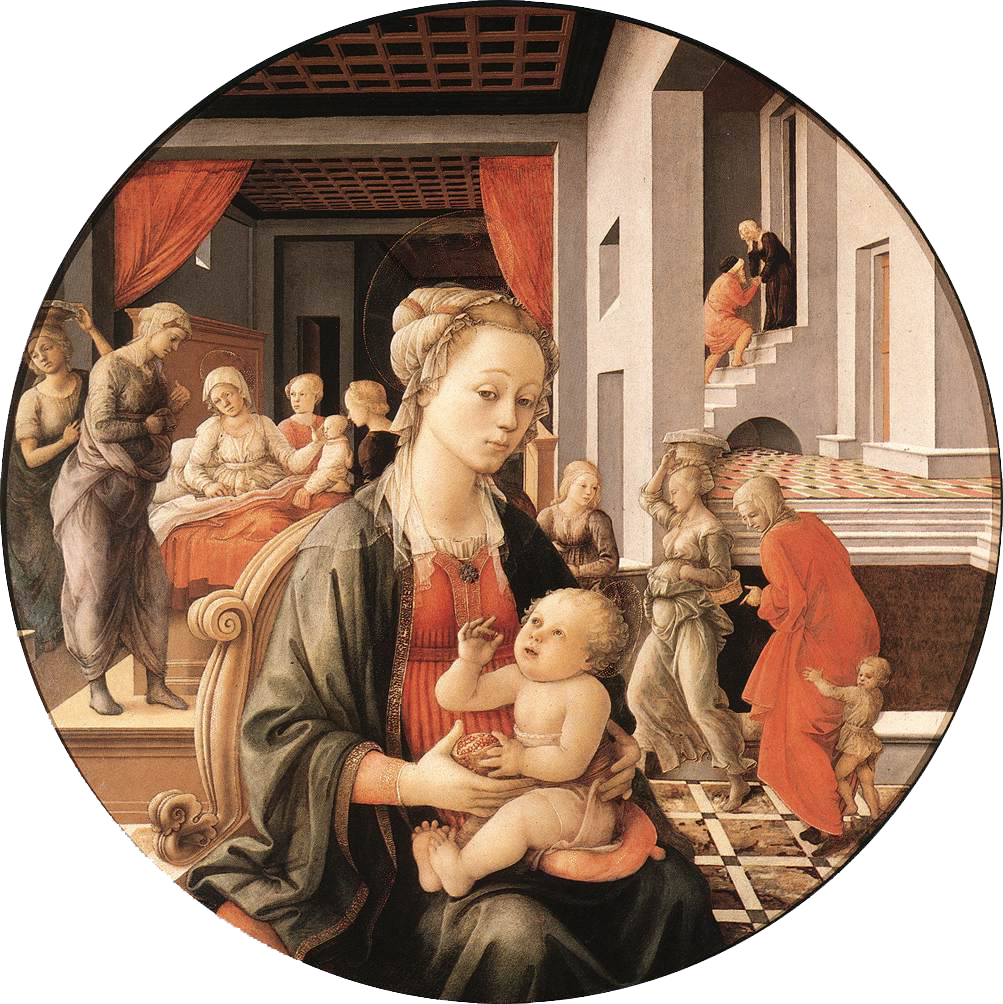
Filippo Lippi
Bartolini Tondo. Diameter 135 cm

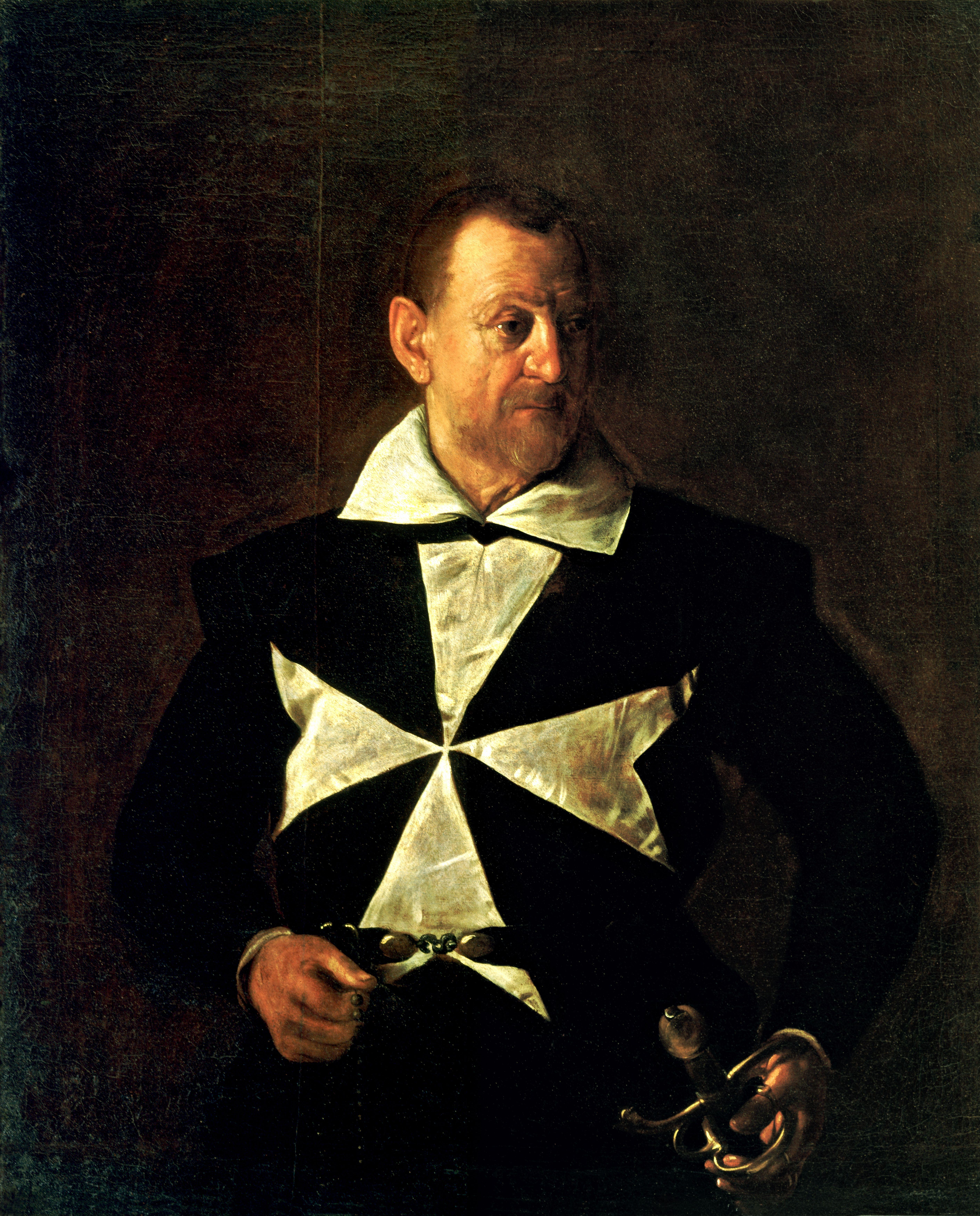
Caravaggio
Portrait of Fra Antonio Martelli. 118 × 95 cm.

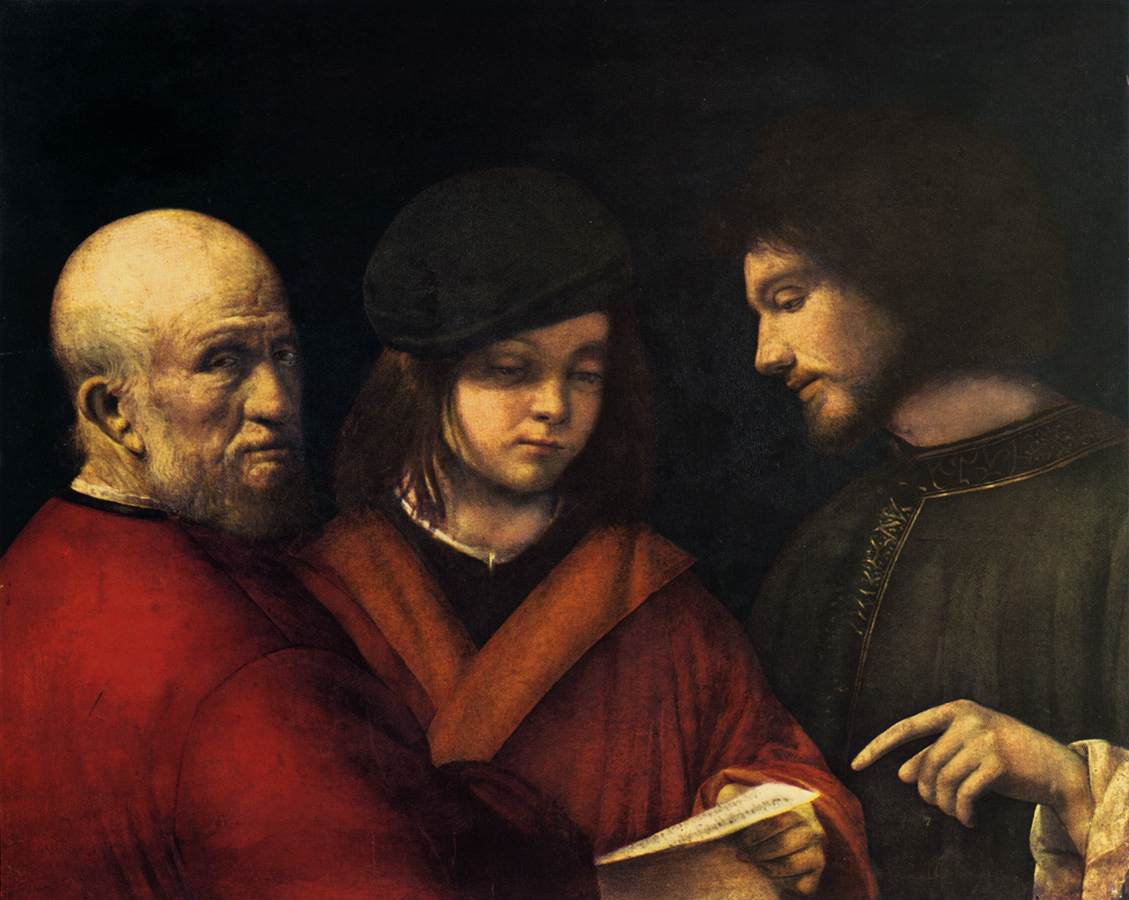
Giorgione
The Three Ages of Man. 62 × 77 cm.

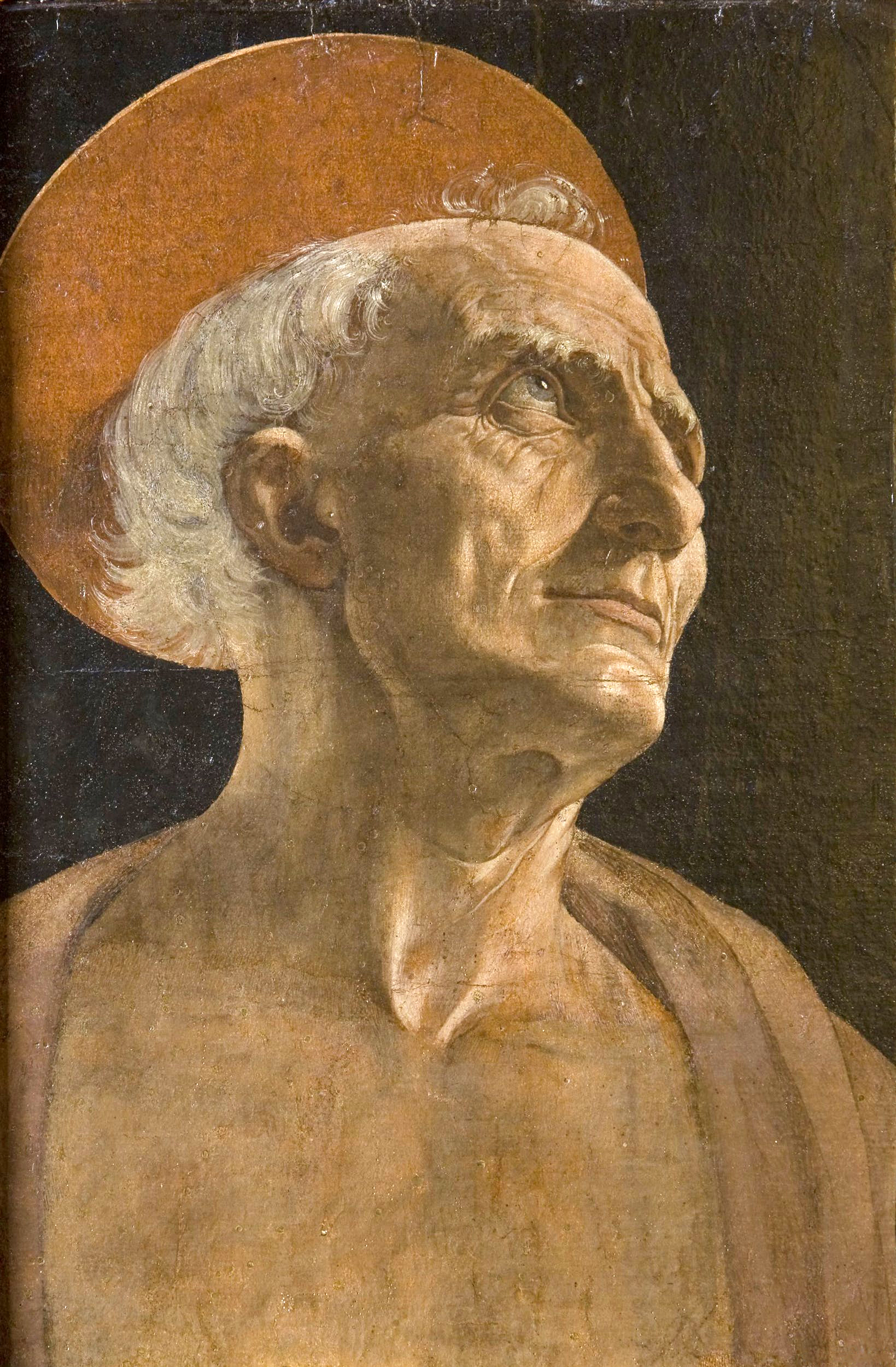
Verrocchio
St. Jerome. 41 × 27 cm.

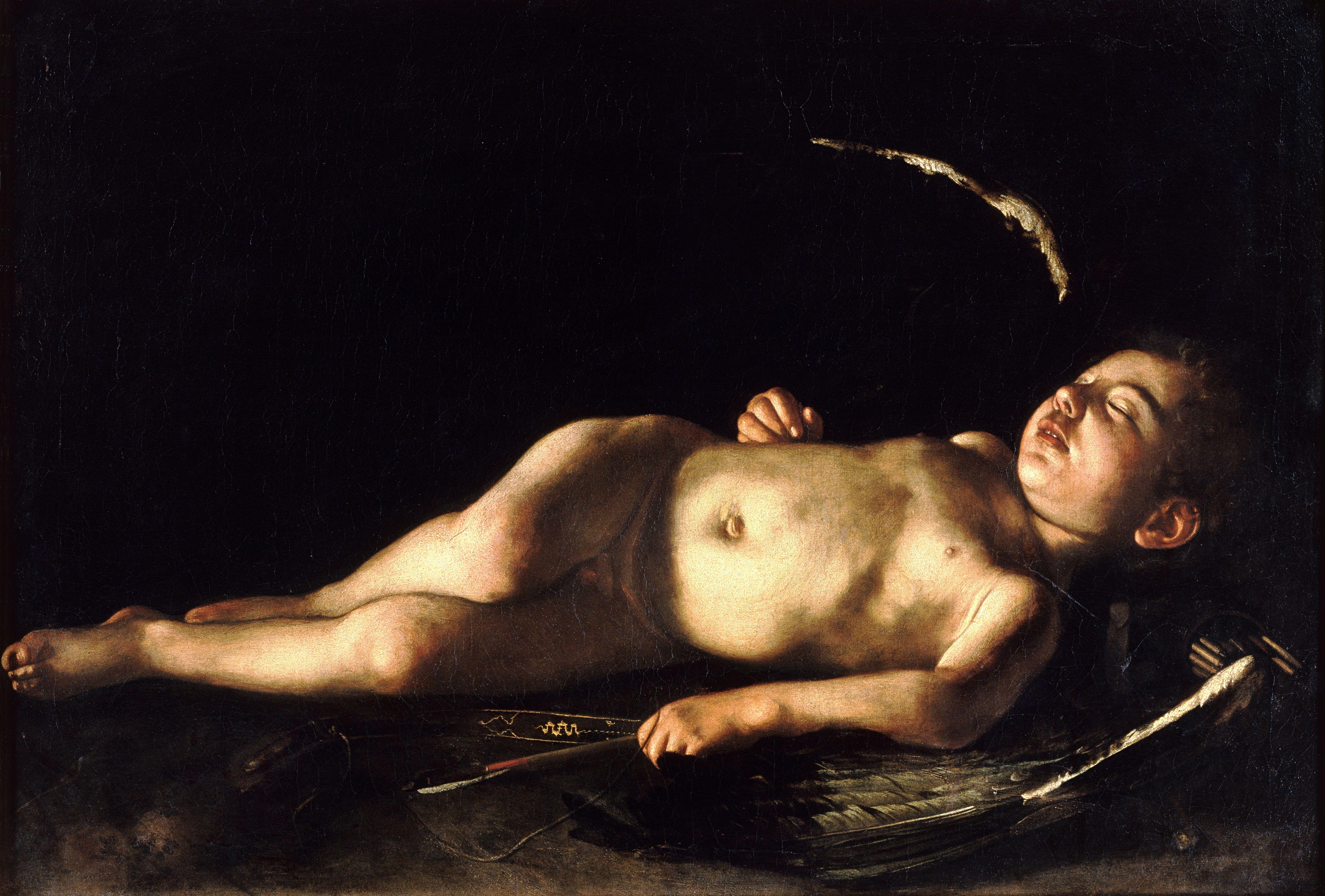
Caravaggio
Sleeping Cupid. 72 × 105 cm.

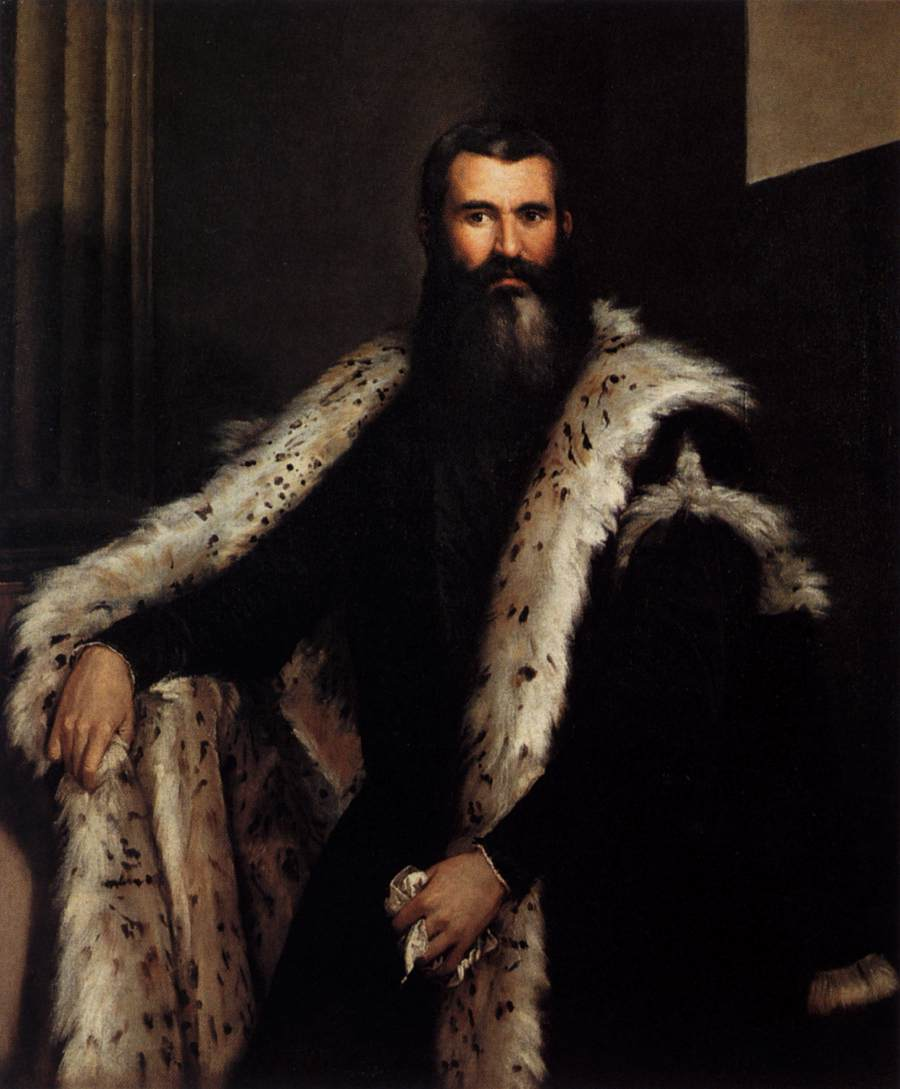
Paolo Veronese
Portrait of a Gentleman in a Fur. 140 × 107 cm.

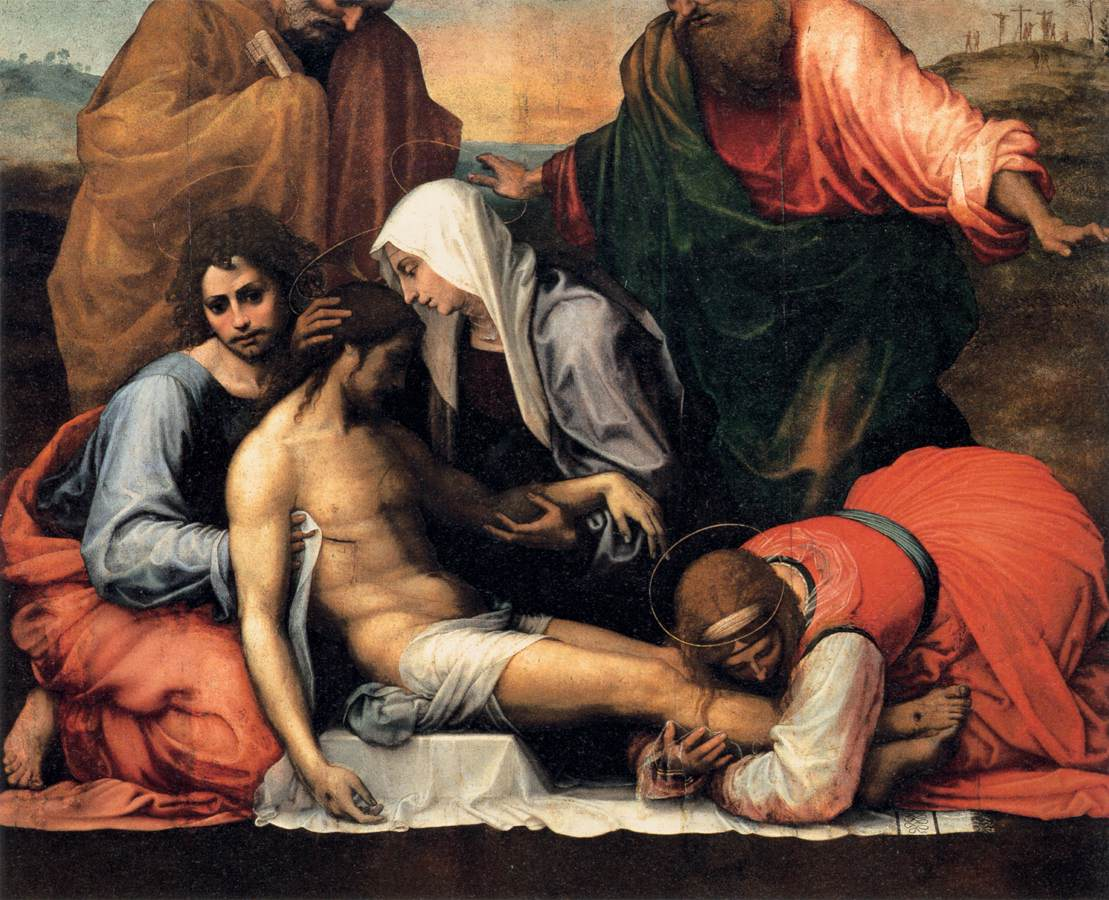
Fra Bartolomeo
Lamentation. 158 × 199 cm.

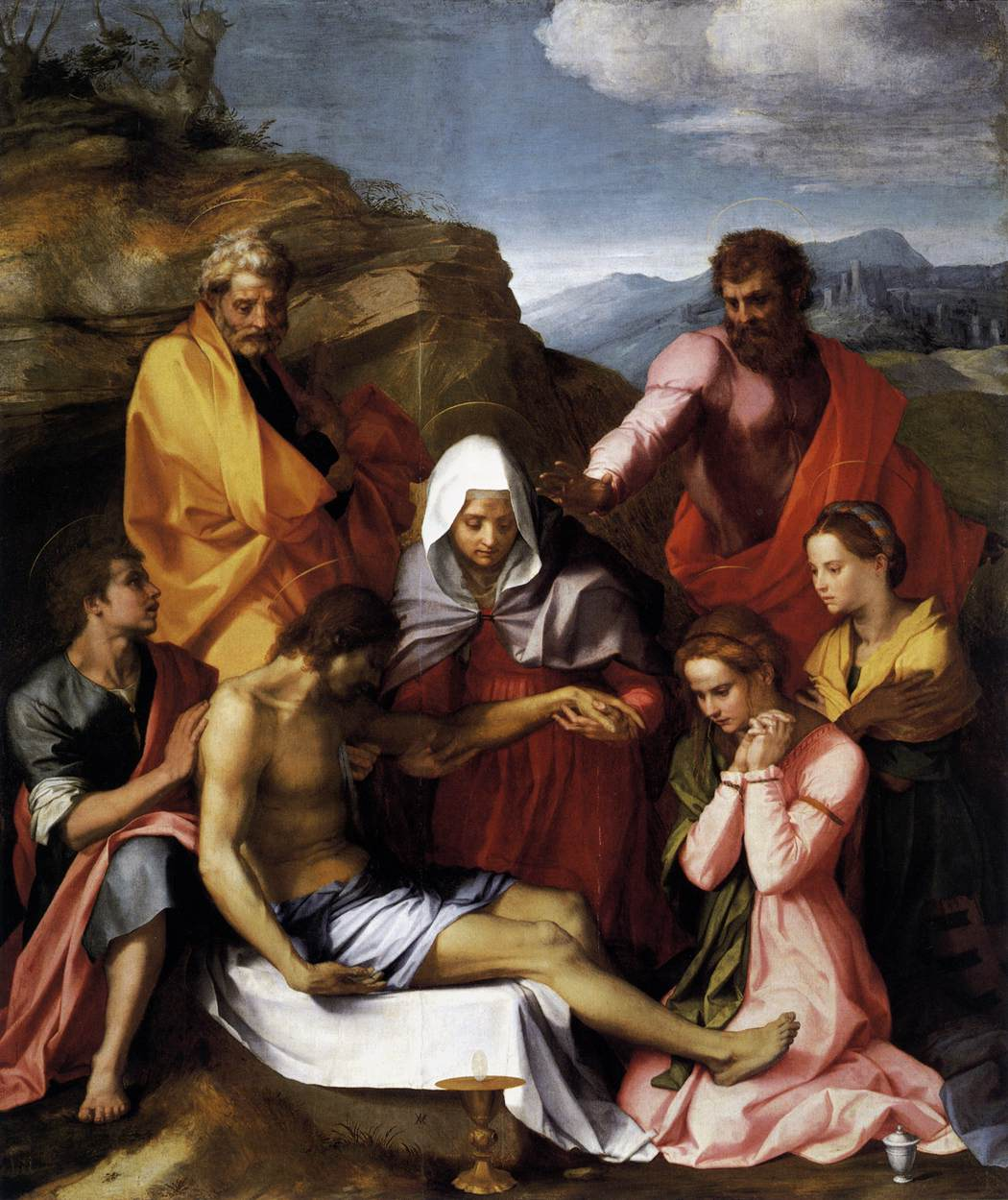
Andrea del Sarto
Pietà with Saints. 239 × 199 cm.

== Other galleries ==
=== Royal Apartments ===
This is a suite of 14 rooms, formerly used by the Medici family, and lived in by their successors. These rooms have been largely altered since the era of the Medici, most recently in the 19th century. They contain a collection of Medici portraits, many of them by the artist Giusto Sustermans. In contrast to the great salons containing the Palatine collection, some of these rooms are much smaller and more intimate, and, while still grand and gilded, are more suited to day-to-day living requirements. Period furnishings include four-poster beds and other necessary furnishings not found elsewhere in the palazzo. The Kings of Italy last used the Palazzo Pitti in the 1920s. By that time it had already been converted to a museum, but a suite of rooms in the Meridian wing (now the Gallery of Modern Art) was reserved for them when visiting Florence officially.

=== Gallery of Modern Art ===
This gallery originates from the remodeling of the Florentine academy in 1748, when a gallery of modern art was established. The gallery was intended to hold those art works which were prize-winners in the academy's competitions. The Palazzo Pitti was being redecorated on a grand scale at this time and the new works of art were being collected to adorn the newly decorated salons. By the mid-19th century so numerous were the modern paintings in the grand ducal collection that many were transferred to the Palazzo della Crocetta, which became the first home of the newly formed "Modern Art Museum".

Following the Risorgimento and the expulsion of the grand ducal family from the palazzo, all the grand ducal modern artworks were brought together under one roof in the newly titled "Modern gallery of the Academy". The collection continued to expand, particularly so under the patronage of Victor Emmanuel II. However, it was not until 1922 that this gallery was moved to the Palazzo Pitti, where it was complemented by further modern works of art in the ownership of both the state and the municipality of Florence. The collection was housed in apartments recently vacated by members of the Italian royal family. The gallery was first opened to the public in 1928.

Today, further enlarged and spread over 30 rooms, this large collection includes works by artists of the Macchiaioli movement and other modern Italian schools of the late 19th and early 20th centuries. The pictures by the Macchiaioli are of particular note, as this school of 19th-century Tuscan painters led by Giovanni Fattori were early pioneers and the founders of the Impressionist movement. The title "gallery of modern art" to some may sound incorrect, as the art in the gallery covers the period from the 18th to the early 20th centuries. No examples of later art are included in the collection since in Italy, "modern art" refers to the period before World War II; what has followed is generally known as "contemporary art" (arte contemporanea). In Tuscany this art can be found at the Centro per l'arte contemporanea Luigi Pecci at Prato, a city about 15 km (9 mi) from Florence.

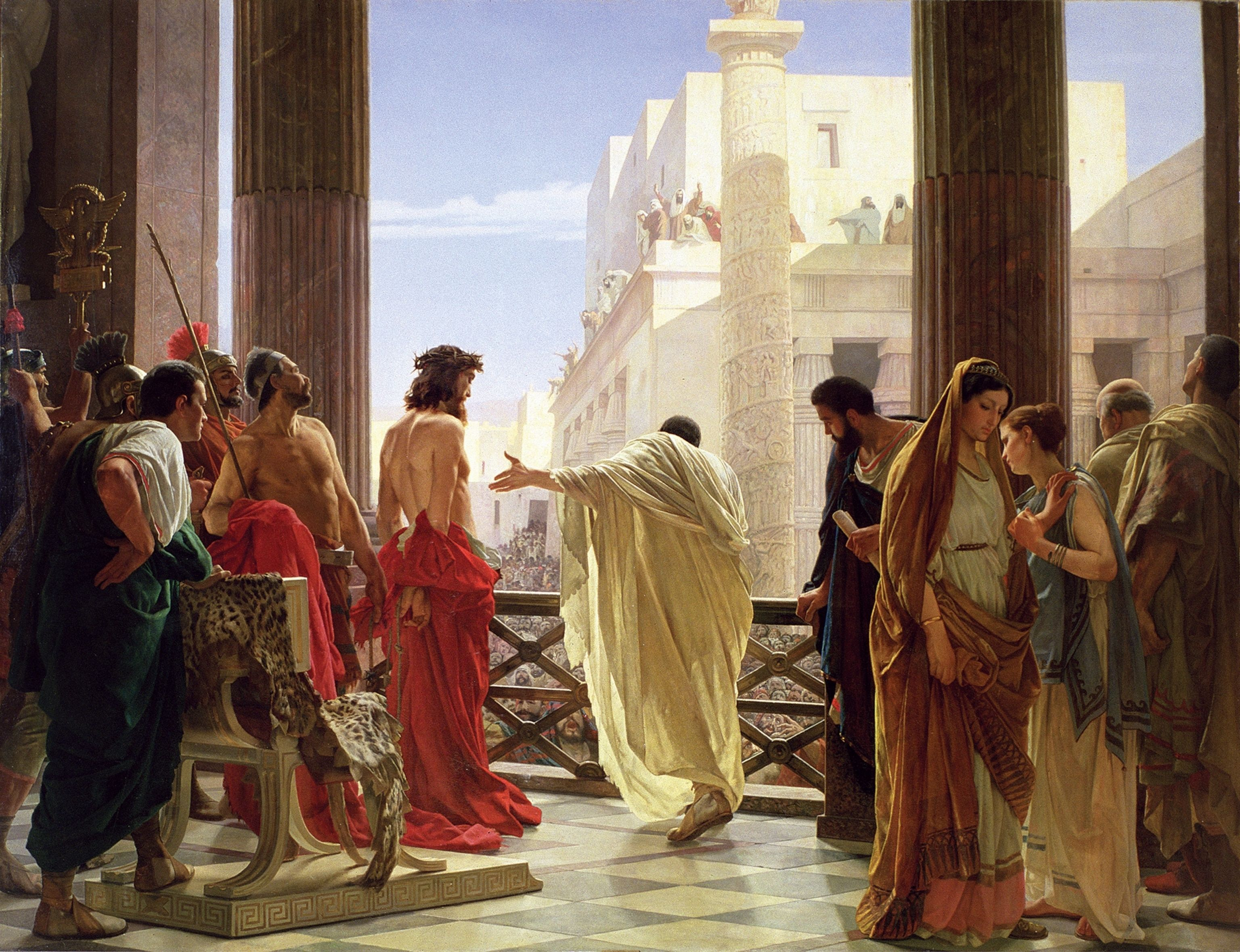
Antonio Ciseri, Ecce Homo (c. 1860–1880)

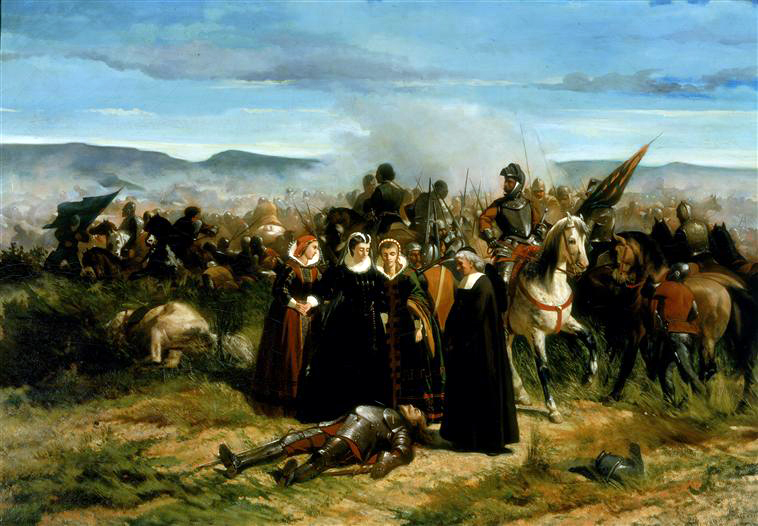
Giovanni Fattori, Mary Stuart at Crookstone (1861)

=== Treasury of the Grand Dukes ===
The Treasury of the Grand Dukes (Tesoro dei Granduchi), formerly called the Silver Museum (Museo degli Argenti), contains a collection of priceless silverware, ivory objects, jewelry, cameos, and works in semi-precious gemstones, many of the latter from the collection of Lorenzo de' Medici, including his collection of ancient vases, many with delicate silver gilt mounts added for display purposes in the 15th century. A room displays "curiosities" from the world collected by the Medici, including a rare pre-Columbian jade mask and two atlatl donated to Pope Leo X. These rooms, formerly part of the private royal apartments, are decorated with 17th-century frescoes, the most splendid being by Giovanni da San Giovanni, from 1635 to 1636. The Treasury also contains a fine collection of German gold and silver artefacts purchased by Grand Duke Ferdinand III after his return from exile in 1815, following the French occupation.

=== Porcelain Museum ===
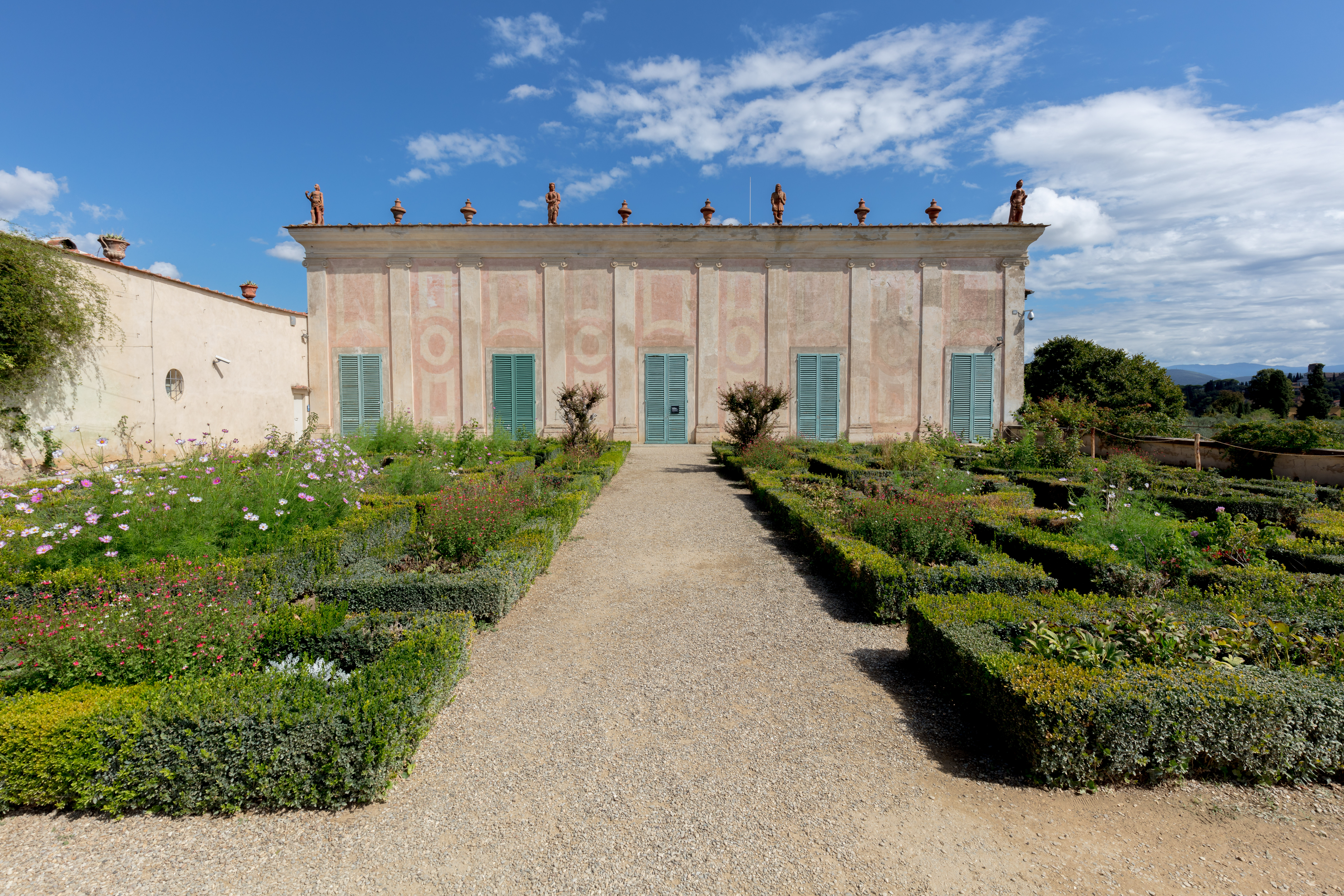
The "Casino del Cavaliere" in the Boboli Gardens now houses the porcelain museum

First opened in 1973, this museum is housed in the Casino del Cavaliere in the Boboli Gardens. The porcelain is from many of the most notable European porcelain factories, with Sèvres porcelain and Meissen porcelain being well represented. Many items in the collection were gifts to the Florentine rulers from other European sovereigns, while other works were specially commissioned by the grand ducal court. Of particular note are several large dinner services by the Vincennes factory, later renamed Sèvres, and a collection of small biscuit figurines.

=== Costume Gallery ===
Situated in a wing known as the "Palazzina della Meridiana", this gallery contains a collection of drresses and theatrical costumes dating from the 16th century until the present. It is also the only museum in Italy detailing the history of Italian fashions. One of the newer collections to the palazzo, it was founded in 1983 by Kirsten Aschengreen Piacenti; a suite of fourteen rooms, the Meridiana apartments, were completed in 1858.

In addition to theatrical costumes, the gallery displays garments worn between the 18th century and the present day. Some of the exhibits are unique to the Palazzo Pitti; these include the 16th-century funeral clothes of Grand Duke Cosimo I de' Medici, and his wife Eleonora of Toledo and their son Garzia, both of whom died of malaria. Their bodies would have been displayed in state wearing their finest clothes, before being reclad in plainer attire before interment. The gallery also exhibits a collection of mid-20th century costume jewellery. The Sala Meridiana originally sponsored a functional solar meridian instrument, built into the fresco decoration by Anton Domenico Gabbiani.

=== Carriages Museum ===
This ground floor museum exhibits half-a dozen of carriages and other conveyances used by the Grand Ducal court mainly in the late 18th and 19th century. The extent of the exhibition prompted one visitor in the 19th century to wonder, "In the name of all that is extraordinary, how can they find room for all these carriages and horses". Some of the carriages are highly decorative, being adorned not only by gilt but by painted landscapes on their panels. Those used on the grandest occasions, such as the "Carrozza d'Oro" (golden carriage), are surmounted by gilt crowns which would have indicated the rank and station of the carriage's occupants. Other carriages on view are those used by the King of the Two Sicilies, and Archbishops and other Florentine dignitaries. This section of the palace is closed since early 2000s.

=== Russian Icons Museum ===
Grand Dukes of Lorrain collected icons of Russia, which were formerly displayed in the Galleria dell'Accademia. The collection, mostly showcasing 18th-century icons from Moscow and Novgorod, was opened in a renewed display in the Cosimo III summer apartments on the ground floor in 2022. The visit of this museum also includes the neoclassical Palace Chapel (Cappella Palatina), decorated by Luigi Ademollo.

== The palazzo today ==
Today, transformed from a royal palace to a museum, the Palazzo Pitti is owned by the Italian state. Once under the management of the Polo Museale Fiorentino, an institution which administered twenty museums, since 2015 it has been a department of the Gallerie degli Uffizi, as a separate and independent structure within the Ministry of Culture, and has ultimate responsibility for 250,000 catalogued works of art. In spite of its metamorphosis from royal residence to a state-owned public building, the palazzo, sitting on its elevated site overlooking Florence, still retains the air and atmosphere of a private collection in a grand house. This is to a great extent due to the Amici di Palazzo Pitti (Friends of the Palazzo Pitti), an organisation of volunteers and patrons founded in 1996, which raises funds and makes suggestions for the ongoing maintenance of the palazzo and the collections, and for the continuing improvement of their visual display.

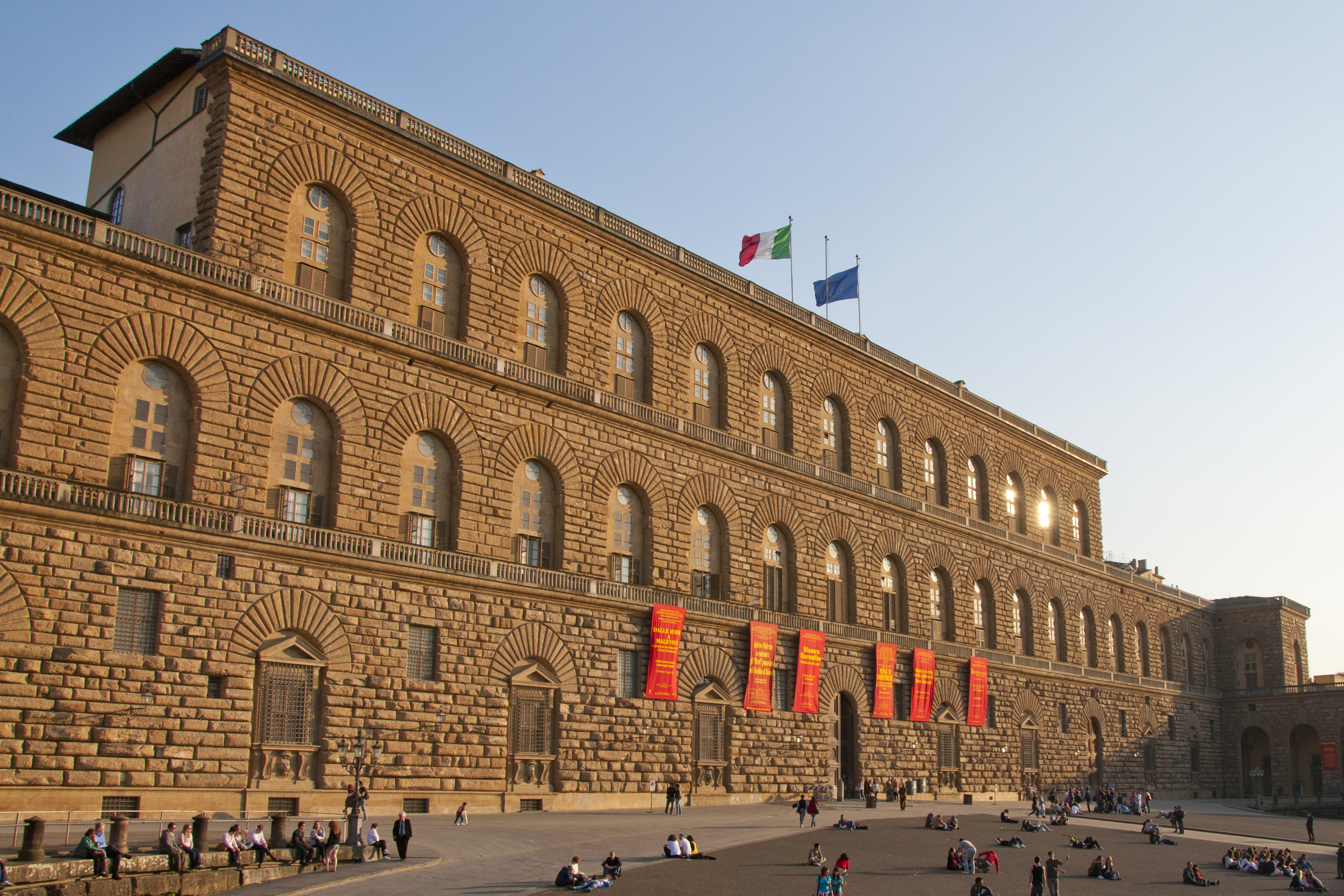
A modern view of the Palazzo Pitti

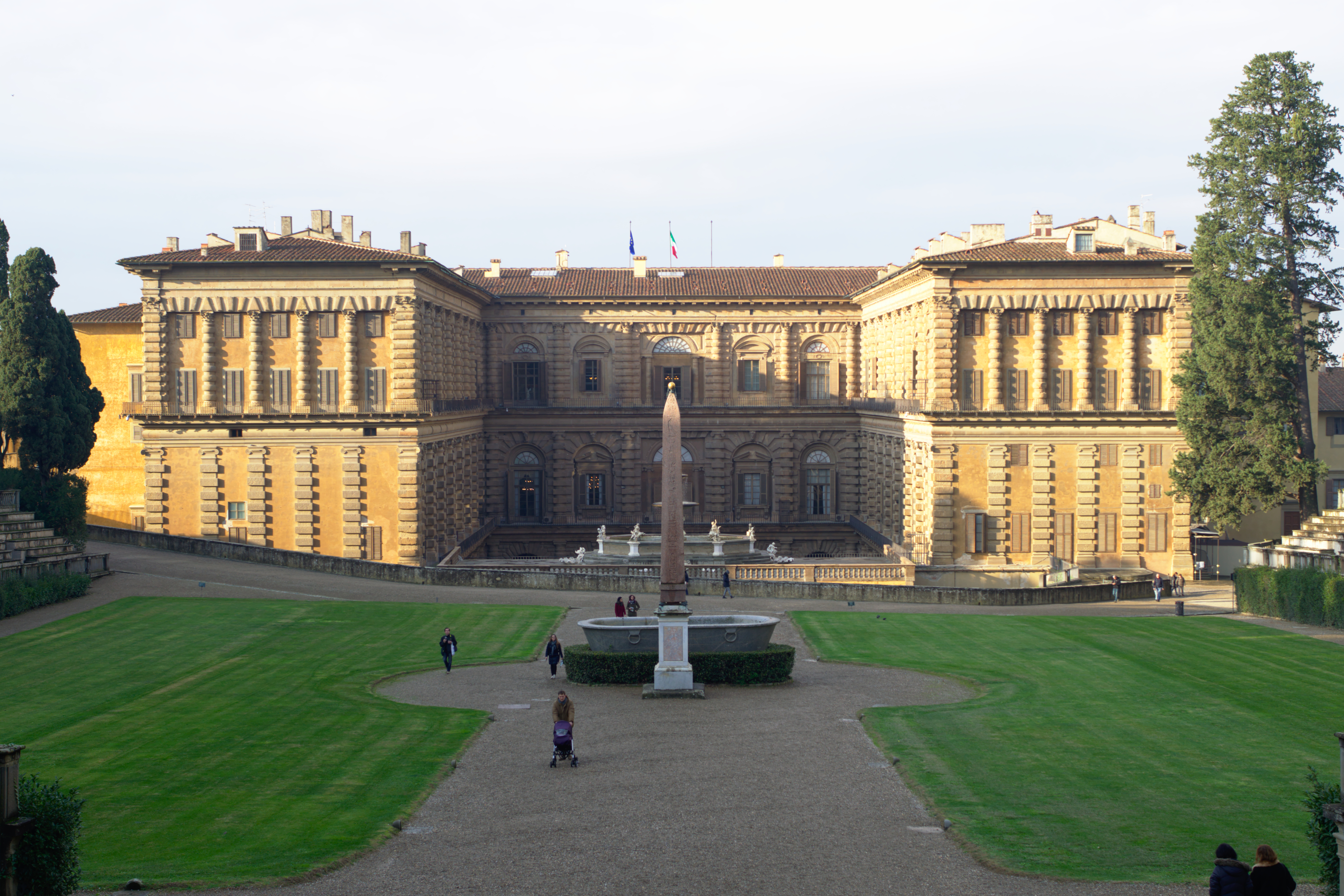
Southern façade of Palazzo Pitti facing the Boboli amphitheatre and obelisk

== Pastiche ==
The Königsbau wing ('King's building / den') of the Munich Residenz, the former royal palace in the capital of Bavaria, was modelled after the Palazzo Pitti.

== General references ==
- Chiarini, Marco (2001). Pitti Palace. Livorno: Sillabe s.r.l. ISBN 88-8347-047-8.
- Chierici, Gino (1964). Il Palazzo Italiano. Milan.
- Dynes, Wayne (1968). Palaces of Europe. London: Hamlyn.
- Levey, Michael. Florence: A Portrait. Harvard University Press, 1998. ISBN 0-674-30658-9
- Masson, Georgina (1959). Italian Villas and Palaces. London: Harry N. Abrams Ltd.
- Pitti Palace and Museums – see sub-pages for individual museums
