= Thomas Beaumont (died 1614) =

English Member of Parliament

Sir Thomas Beaumont (c. 1555 – 27 November 1614) of Stoughton Grange, Leicestershire, was an English Member of Parliament for Leicester.

His father, Nicholas Beaumont of Coleorton was also an MP and his mother, Anne was the daughter of William Saunders of Welford, Northants. Thomas' elder brother Henry Beaumont preceded him as MP for Leicester. Thomas Beaumont was knighted in 1603 and elected MP for Leicester in 1604.

Thomas Beaumont married Katherine Farnham, daughter of Thomas Farnham (MP) of Stoughton Grange. They produced ten children; three sons (Henry, Farnham, and Thomas) and seven daughters (Elizabeth, Frances, Anne, Elinor, Isabel, Jane, Mary). Henry's son, Sir Thomas Beaumont, became the first Baronet of Stoughton Grange. Their daughter Elizabeth Richardson, 1st Lady Cramond was created Baroness (Scotland) in her own right by Charles I of England and her daughter (also named Elizabeth) married Frederick Cornwallis, 1st Baron Cornwallis. Their eldest daughter Frances married Sir Wolstan Dixie of Appleby Magna.

After Beaumont's death, the composer Thomas Vautor composed an elegiac madrigal in his honor.

== Bibliography ==
- Sir Thomas Beaumont, in Lundy, Darryl. The Peerage: A genealogical survey of the peerage of Britain as well as the royal families of Europe.
- BEAUMONT, Sir Thomas I (c.1555-1614), of Stoughton Grange, Leics., in The History of Parliament.
