= George Beaumont (disambiguation) =

Sir George Beaumont, 7th Baronet (1753–1827) was British MP for Bere Alston, amateur painter, patron and collector.

George Beaumont may also refer to:

== Other baronets ==
- Sir George Beaumont, 4th Baronet (c. 1664–1737), English MP for Leicester
- Sir George Beaumont, 6th Baronet (1726–1762) of the Beaumont baronets
- Sir George Howland Willoughby Beaumont, 8th Baronet (1799–1845) of the Beaumont baronets
- Sir George Howland Beaumont, 9th Baronet (1828–1882) of the Beaumont baronets
- Sir George Howland William Beaumont, 10th Baronet (1851–1914) of the Beaumont baronets
- Sir George Arthur Hamilton Beaumont, 11th Baronet (1881–1933) of the Beaumont baronets
- Sir George Howland Francis Beaumont, 12th Baronet (1924–2011) of the Beaumont baronets

== Others ==
- George Beaumont, character in On the Edge of Innocence
- George Beaumont (minister) (fl. 1800–1830), British nonconformist and controversialist
- George Beaumont (Dean of Derry), seventeenth-century Church of Ireland priest and Dean of Derry
- George Beaumont (Archdeacon of Invercargill and Queenstown), nineteenth-century priest of the Anglican Diocese of Dunedin
- George Beaumont (rower) (1904–1991), British rower

== See also ==
- Beaumont (surname)
