= Coleorton Hall =

Country house in Leicestershire, England

Coordinates: 52.752019°N 1.421901°W

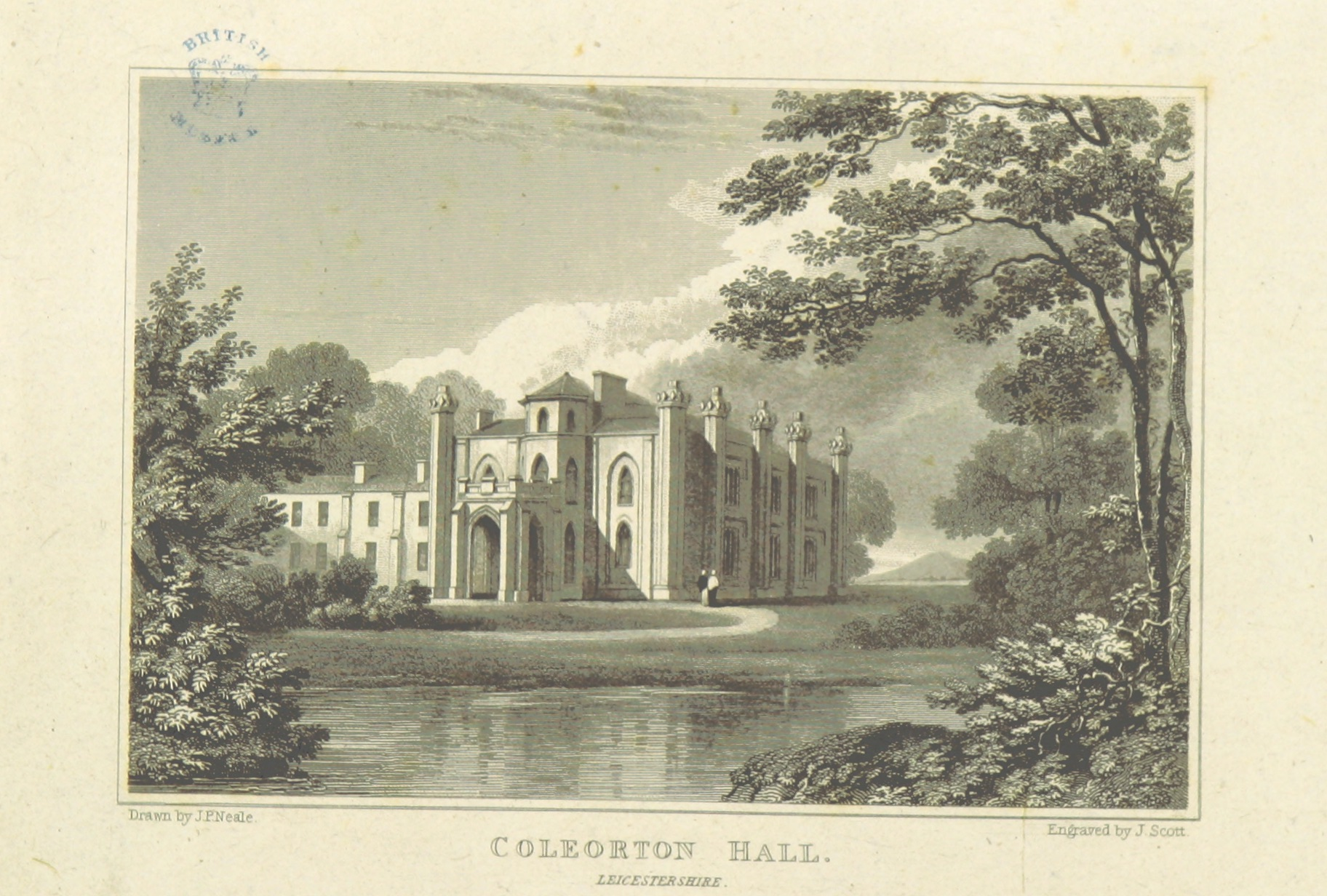
Coleorton Hall, Leicestershire; illustration from Views of the Seats of Noblemen and Gentlemen in England, Wales, Scotland and Ireland by John Preston Neale

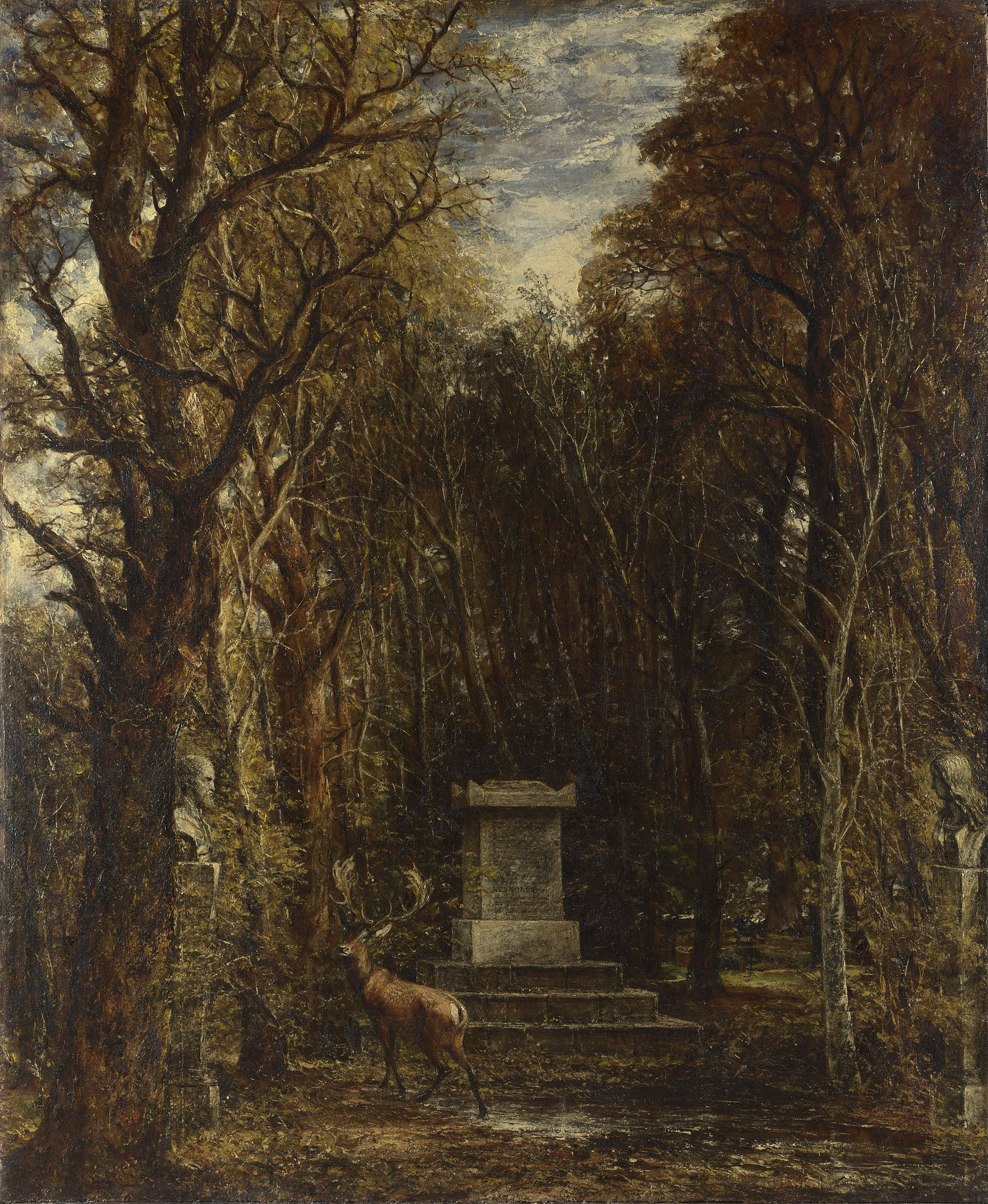
Cenotaph to the Memory of Sir Joshua Reynolds by John Constable, 1836.

Coleorton Hall is a 19th-century country mansion, formerly the seat of the Beaumont baronets of Stoughton Grange. Situated at Coleorton, Leicestershire, it is a Grade II* listed building now converted into residential apartments.

The manor of Coleorton was acquired by the Beaumont family by marriage in the 15th century. Sir Henry Beaumont, High Sheriff of Leicestershire was knighted in 1603. His son Thomas was created a baronet in 1619 and was raised to the Peerage as Viscount Beaumont of Swords, Dublin in 1622. Thomas Beaumont produced a masque entertainment at Coleorton in honour of William Seymour, (later Duke of Somerset), and his wife Frances.

On the death of the third Viscount in 1702 the estate passed to a distant cousin Sir George Beaumont, 4th Baronet of Stoughton Grange who was Member of Parliament for Leicester 1702-37. Following his death in 1737 and that of his brother in 1738, the estate and baronetcy passed to a cousin George Beaumont, of Great Dunmow, Essex. His son Sir George Beaumont, 7th Baronet rebuilt the old manor house in about 1804 to a design by architect George Dance the Younger. The grounds were laid out by Uvedale Price. Under the 7th Baronet, a patron of the arts whose collection formed the foundation of the National Gallery, Coleorton Hall's regular guests included William Wordsworth (who designed the Winter Garden in 1806), Samuel Taylor Coleridge, Sir Walter Scott and John Constable.

In 1848, two extensions, the Picture Gallery and Beaumont Room, with its ornate ceiling panels, were added.

The ninth baronet, High Sheriff in 1852, substantially remodelled the house in about 1862, with the assistance of architect FP Cockerell, adding another storey. The main entrance front has three storeys and five bays, with an off-centre porte-cochere leading to a vaulted porch within a canted full-height bay.

In 1948 the Beaumonts sold the house to the National Coal Board for use as offices. In the early 1990s, the hall was rented to Fison's Pharmaceuticals. Both the Uk Operation and EMEA Sales management moved into the hall after relocating from other Fison's offices mainly based in Loughborough. The Hall was redecorated and refurbished after it was seen to be a little run down. In 1997 it was sold for redevelopment and converted into residential apartments.

== HS2 and the Coleorton Hall Estate ==
The realignment of HS2 means that it will run several hundred metres away from any of the Coleorton Hall Estate grounds, the route is published on the HS2 website. HS2, if and when built will have to be in a deep cutting in this area due to the geographical elevation being higher than any of the surrounding areas. As of October 2020, the eastern leg of Phase 2b that is due to run past the Coleorton Hall Estate has been postponed indefinitely and the consensus is that it will likely never happen with the government more likely to focus on the Northern Power House routes.
