= Leicester Airport =

Airport in Leicestershire, England

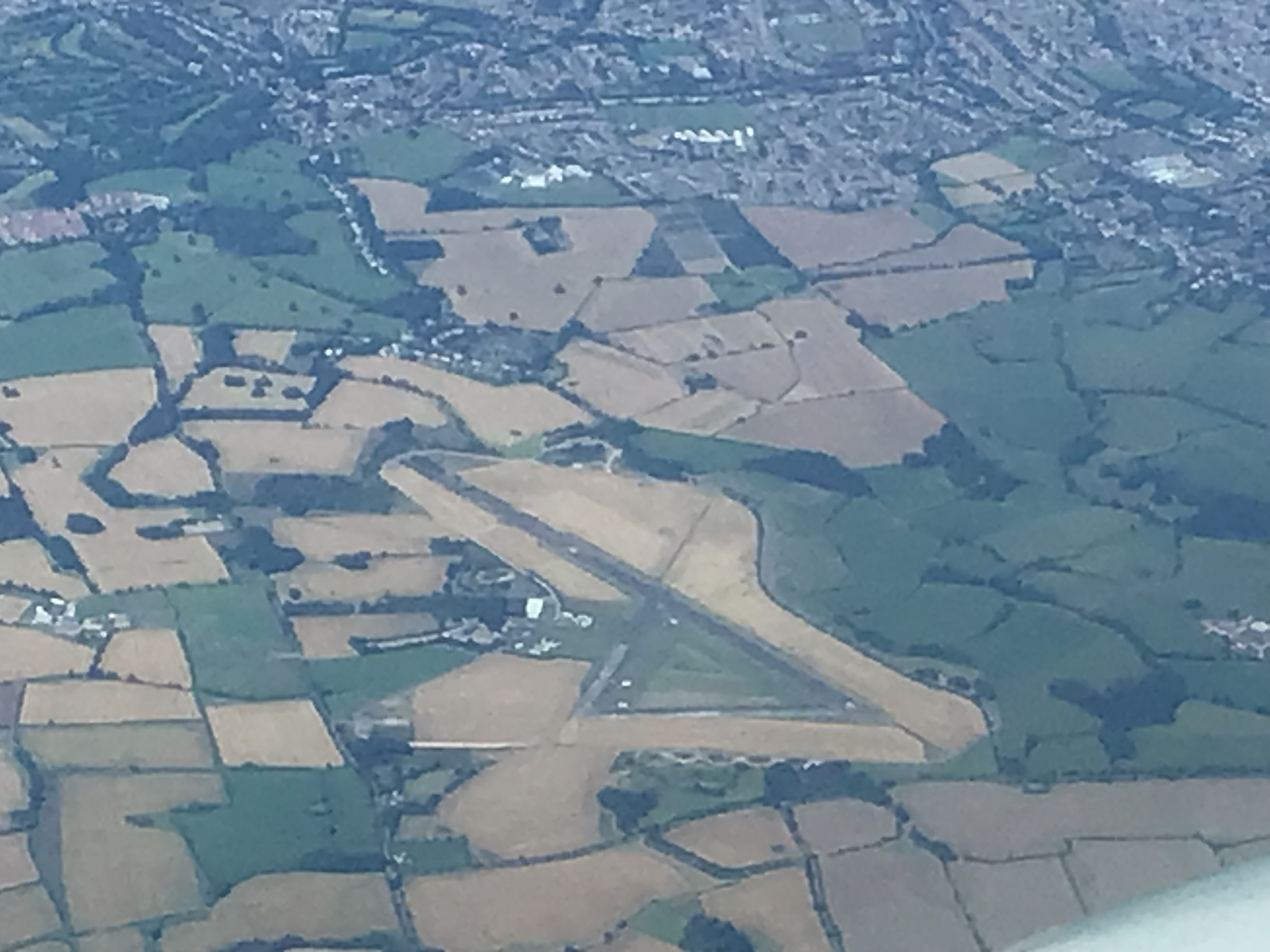
- IATA: none; ICAO: EGBG

Summary
- Airport type: Private
- Operator: Leicestershire Aero Club
- Location: Stoughton, Leicestershire, England
- Elevation AMSL: 469 ft (143 m)
- Coordinates: 52°36′28″N 001°01′55″W

Map
- Location in Leicestershire

Runways
Direction	Length		Surface
Direction	m	ft	Surface
04/22	490	1,608	Asphalt
06/24	340	1,115	Grass
10/28	935	3,068	Asphalt
15/33	495	1,624	Asphalt
16/34	418	1,371	Grass
- Sources: UK AIP at NATS>

Leicester Airport (IATA: None, ICAO: EGBG) is an aerodrome located to the east of Stoughton, Leicestershire, England, about 6 miles (9.7 km) east of Leicester city centre by road. The Leicestershire Aero Club, the airport operator, provide elementary flight training, experience flights and the airport is home to a wide variety of private aircraft.

The airport has a CAA Ordinary Licence (Number P720) that allows flights for the public transport of passengers or for flying instruction as authorised by the licensee—Leicestershire Aero Club Limited. However, the airport does not currently operate public transport services.

== History ==
The airfield was constructed in 1942 as part of the former RAF station, RAF Leicester East. The facility was named Stoughton Aerodrome prior to 1974.

The Leicester Mercury reported in January 2008 that plans to build a new eco-town on the site of the airport were under consideration, and on 3 April 2008 it was announced that the Pennbury proposal was one of fifteen sites shortlisted for the next phase of public consultations. However, a more recent report stated the eco-town would be built elsewhere. As of 2022, there were no plans for the renovation of Leicester Airport.

== Accidents and incidents ==
- In December 2011, a pilot was killed and two others were injured, when two light aircraft collided in mid-air, near the airport.
