= Sir Henry Beaumont, 2nd Baronet =

English politician

Sir Henry Beaumont, 2nd Baronet (2 April 1638 – 27 January 1689) was an English politician.

He was the oldest son of Sir Thomas Beaumont, 1st Baronet and Elizabeth Trott, daughter of Sir Nicholas Trott, and was baptised at Stoughton Grange. Beaumont was educated at St John's College, Oxford and succeeded his father as baronet in 1676. He sat as a Member of Parliament (MP) for Leicester between 1679 and 1689.

On 2 April 1662, he married Elizabeth Farmer, daughter of George Farmer, at St Andrew's Church, Holborn. They had seven daughters and fourteen sons (six having died as infants). Beaumont was buried at Stoughton, Leicestershire and was succeeded in the baronetcy successively by his sons Thomas, George and Lewis.

Parliament of England
Preceded by Sir William Hartopp; John Grey	Member of Parliament for Leicester; 1679–1689; With: John Grey 1679–1685; Thomas Babington 1685–1689	Succeeded by Lawrence Carter; Thomas Babington
Baronetage of England
Preceded by Thomas Beaumont	Baronet (of Stoughton Grange); 1676–1689	Succeeded by Thomas Beaumont
