= Thomas Beaumont, 1st Viscount Beaumont of Swords =

English politician

Thomas Beaumont, 1st Viscount Beaumont of Swords (c. 1582 – 8 February 1625) was an English politician who sat in the House of Commons between 1604 and 1611. He was raised to the peerage in 1622.

Beaumont was the son of Sir Henry Beaumont of Cole Orton, Leicestershire and his wife Elizabeth Loveys, daughter of John Loveys of London. He was educated at Peterhouse, Cambridge (c. 1596) and studied law at the Inner Temple in 1610. He was knighted at Belvoir Castle on 23 April 1603.

In 1604, he was elected member of parliament for Tamworth. He was a justice of the peace for Leicestershire by 1608 to 1616 and from 1618 to at least 1623 and was appointed Sheriff of Leicestershire for 1610–11. He was a member of the Virginia Company by 1612. Thomas Beaumont produced a masque entertainment at Coleorton Hall in honour of William Seymour, (later Duke of Somerset), and his wife Frances.

He was created baronet on 17 September 1619 and created Viscount Beaumont of Swords on 20 May 1622. Swords was a town in County Dublin, and now in County Fingal.

Beaumont died as the result of his injuries in a duel. He had married in or before 1614 Elizabeth Sapcote, daughter of Henry Sapcote of Bracebridge, Lincolnshire and his wife Eleanor Sapcote of Huntingdonshire. They had 4 sons and 3 daughters. He was succeeded by his son Sapcote Beaumont, 2nd Viscount Beaumont of Swords.

Parliament of England
Preceded by George Egeock; Robert Burdett	Member of Parliament for Tamworth; 1604–1611; With: John Ferrers	Succeeded by Sir Thomas Roe; Sir Percival Willoughby
Peerage of Ireland
New creation	Viscount Beaumont of Swords; 1622–1625	Succeeded by Sapcote Beaumont
Baronetage of England
New creation	Baronet (of Cole Orton); 1619–1625	Succeeded by Sapcote Beaumont
