= Sir Thomas Beaumont, 1st Baronet =

English politician

Sir Thomas Beaumont, 1st Baronet (died 11 August 1676) was an English politician.

== Biography ==
Beaumont was the oldest son of Sir Henry Beaumont (son of Thomas Beaumont) and Elizabeth, daughter of Sir William Turpin. Beaumont sat as a member of parliament (MP) for Leicestershire between 1654 and 1659 and was High Sheriff of Leicestershire between 1668 and 1669. On 5 March 1658, he was created a baronet, of Stoughton Grange, in the County of Leicester by the Lord Protector Oliver Cromwell. After the Restoration however this creation was declared invalid and Beaumont received a new patent, dated on 21 February 1661.

== Family ==
Beaumont married Elizabeth Trott, daughter of Sir Nicholas Trott. They had three sons and three daughters. Beaumont was buried at Stoughton, Leicestershire and was succeeded in the baronetcy by his eldest son Henry.

== Notes ==
Baronetage of England
| New creation | Baronet (of Stoughton Grange); 1661–1676 | Succeeded by Henry Beaumont |
