= Stoughton Grange =

Country house in Leicestershire, England

Coordinates: 52.6139°N 1.0703°W

Stoughton Grange was a country house in the parish of Stoughton in Leicestershire and the family seat of the Farnham and Beaumont family. The house dated back to 15th century but was demolished in 1926, after being a successful family home for over five hundred years.

== History and ownership ==
The earliest record of the Grange was during the reign of Edward the Confessor between 1042-1066 at a place known as “Stoctone”. At the Domesday survey of 1068 the land around Stoctone had been granted to Hugh de Grandmesnil, later descending to Robert Bossu, Earl of Leicester, who founded Leicester Abbey. In 1157 Bossu gave what was now Stoughton to the Abbey and the land became a great source of income for the Abbey from the arable and pasture farmland.

The next four hundred years the estate was improved and saw the construction of St. Mary and All Saints Church in the village during the 13th century and Abbott John Penny erected the first building known as “Stoughton Grange” in the 15th century. The church became the family church for the later resident families of the house and the family crypt is inside the church along with numerous memorials to the family.

== As a house ==
In 1538 the Abbey and estates were surrendered to King Henry VIII and in 1560 Queen Elizabeth I granted Stoughton to John Harington. The Stoughton estate was then purchased by Thomas Farnham who was the ‘Chancellor of the Exchequer’ to Elizabeth I.

For over three hundred years the Stoughton Estate remained in the ownership of the Farnham family and its descendants. The family name changed through the marriage of Farnham to the Beaumont family who are believed to be descendants of John Beaumont. Sir Thomas Beaumont, 1st Baronet of Stoughton Grange lived at the house until he died in 1676. His son Sir Henry Beaumont inherited the estate was also an MP for Leicestershire. The house and estate later passed to Anthony Keck of Lincolns Inn as his wife was Anne Busby of Beaumont, daughter of William Busby and Catherine Beaumont his wife. They had a son Anthony James Keck who became a politician and married Elizabeth Legh (daughter of Peter Legh of Lyme). The couple lived at Stoughton Grange and had six children, the only son to survive and inherit was George Anthony Legh Keck who lived at the house until he married his cousin Elizabeth Atherton in 1802 so that he could inherit the family’s Bank Hall estate in Lancashire. It was following the marriage that he moved to Bank Hall which he later renovated in 1832 and used Stoughton as a second home. Legh Keck remained a member of parliament for Leicestershire and frequently travelled between the estates. Upon the death of Legh Keck his brother-in-law Thomas Powys, 3rd Baron Lilford, inherited his estates, but also died a year later.

In 1871 Harry Leycester Powys Keck lived at Stoughton Grange and was High Sheriff of Leicestershire. Powys Keck was the last line of the family to live at the house until 1913 when the house was put up for sale. The house was not sold and it remained unoccupied until it was demolished in 1925–6. However, Powys Keck moved away after the Stoughton estate was bought by the Co-operative Wholesale Society Ltd. in 1919 and the site of the mansion was then known as Grange Farm, the centre of the society's dairy-farming in Leicestershire.

== Architecture ==
At the core of the house had a pre- Tudor foundation that evolved in style throughout the ages to an Elizabethan house. In the late 18th century Anthony James Keck (d. 1786), had the house re-modelled to a gothic style, that was thought to be superimposed upon the Elizabethan house. In 1820 the house gained the three small Gothic lodges (which still survive) on the road to Evington and on the Gartree road. The lodges bear the arms of the Keck family and are Grade II listed buildings. The house was finished as a Victorian mansion in an Elizabethan style, complete with spired towers overlooking the garden front and parkland.
