= Thomas Farnham =

Thomas Farnham may refer to:

- Thomas J. Farnham (1804–1848), explorer and author of the American West
- Thomas Farnham (Brookside)
- Thomas Farnham (MP) (died 1562), Member of Parliament for Gatton, Leicester and East Grinstead
