= North West Bicester =

North West Bicester (NW Bicester) is one of four eco-towns that were originally given the green light by the government in 2009 to act as showcases for environmentally sustainable communities. It will be a true zero carbon development on the edge of Bicester, Oxfordshire, through measures including renewable energy, sustainable travel options and homes with high energy efficiency ratings. In April 2011, the coalition government announced that only NW Bicester would actually be built to the originally proposed standards under the government's Eco Town Planning Policy Statement 1, which is often referred to as the Eco Town PPS.

== The development: Masterplan and Exemplar Phase ==
Masterplan: NW Bicester is a proposed 6,000-home development to extend Bicester onto agricultural land to the north-west of the town. Plans for the 1,000-acre site include 40% green open space, a nature reserve and country park; three local centres comprising retail, leisure, nurseries, a health centre and community halls. The plans also include one secondary school, three new primary schools and space for business. There will be links to Bicester through footpaths, cycle-ways and public transport connections.

Exemplar: The first phase of the development was granted planning consent in principle in August 2011 by Cherwell District Council. The detailed plans were approved in August 2012. The application site is just over 51 acres to the north of Bicester adjoining the B4100 on its eastern side and wraps around Home Farm, Caversfield. The most southerly part of the site is approximately 120 metres north of the existing extent of development at Bicester (Bure Park). The approved plans include 393 homes and 40% green open space. The Homes and Communities Agency (HCA) has invested £6m to build 119 affordable homes, the remaining 274 homes will be for private sale. The plans include a combined heat and power energy centre, a nursery of up to 350 square metres, community centre of up to 350 square metres and three retail units of up to 770 square metres. Permission was also granted for an eco-business centre of up to 1,800 square metres (use class B1), office accommodation of up to 1,100 square metres (use class B1), an “eco-pub” of up to 190 square metres (use class A4), and a primary school site measuring up to 1.34 hectares. Community space will incorporate communal barbecue areas, herb boxes and allotments.

== Eco-measures ==
The homes will be built to true zero carbon standards, measuring regulated and unregulated energy. Plans include zero waste to landfill during construction. Solar photovoltaic panels are planned for all residential and non-residential buildings, all of which will feature significant levels of insulation and will be built to code level 5 for sustainable homes. Additional energy is to be provided from an energy centre containing a gas-fired combined heat and power system. The Exemplar phase is a net provider of energy, supplying excess energy generated back to the national grid. Real time information about the homes solar PV energy generation, energy consumption and costs, and water usage will be communicated in every home via a tablet device.

The combined residential solar array will be the biggest in the UK, with an average of 34m2 solar PV per roof. Homes will include triple glazing, rainwater harvesting and heat and hot water provided from the CHP via a network of underground pipes. Homes have been designed to cope with climate change peaks of up to 10 degrees Celsius.

== Transport ==
NW Bicester has a target to reduce local car journeys from 67.5% to 50% by 2026. A number of features have been incorporated to encourage residents to adopt more sustainable modes of travel. The planning conditions oblige a community bus service from the date of the first occupation, half-hourly bus service once the 50th home is occupied and a 15-minute service after the 200th. A communal car club will be available for residents to access and book. Real time bus information and the availability of the car club will be visible in every home via a tablet device.

In addition, communal electric car charging points will be accessible on site and available to every home within the first two years of occupation, cycle stores will come as standard for each home and the development will have segregated cycle-ways and pedestrian routes linking directly into the town's existing network.

Improvements to Junction 10 of the M40 have also been designed to support NW Bicester and improve links with Silverstone and Brackley. The improvements are due to start in 2015 and will cost around £1.3 million. Work will involve replacing the current southbound entry slip road and widening the A43 southbound.

== Construction ==
The Exemplar will be constructed in four main phases. Pre-construction works commenced in April 2014. The fourth phase of the development is due to be completed in 2018.

== Developer and partners ==
The lead developer on NW Bicester is A2Dominion who appointed Willmott Dixon as its principal contractor for the first phase of the Exemplar. A2Dominion, working in partnership with Cherwell District Council, has appointed expert consultants including Silver DCC Limited (Client Representative), Bioregional, Farrells, Barton Willmore, SQW Consultants, Hyder Consulting, PRP Architects and Oxford Brookes University to help deliver the project.

== Community governance ==
Cherwell District Council and A2Dominion are working on plans for a community-led governance structure that will offer residents and businesses the opportunity to work together to make decisions about the issues that affect their immediate area.

== Jobs and business ==
A2Dominion and Willmott Dixon are working together to achieve 20% local labour on site during construction. A minimum of ten apprenticeships will be made available over the five year construction of the Exemplar.

Local suppliers and sub-contractors are able to register an interest to be involved in the delivery of the scheme.

== Green Space / Biodiversity ==
The Exemplar phase will feature 40% green space, specially designed cycle and pedestrian routes and all garages will have meadow turf roofs.

Many of the existing hedgerows at the site will be kept and incorporated into the eco town design and proposals feature a network of sustainable wildlife corridors and ponds.

In December 2013, A2Dominion purchased 51 acres from Altitude Real Estate LLP which makes up the Exemplar development site currently under construction.
