= Erasmus de la Fontaine =

English landowner (1601-1672)

Sir Erasmus II de la Fontaine (1601-1672) was an English landowner from a Huguenot family, who lived at Kirby Bellars in Leicestershire.

He served King Charles I as High Sheriff of Leicestershire in 1628. His other estates included the manor of Holme at Langford, Bedfordshire, Moulton Park in Northamptonshire and the manor of Newhall near Hornchurch in Essex. He also had a home in the City of London off Aldermanbury, whose location was known as Fountain Court (now part of the Guildhall grounds).

Under the Commonwealth his estates were confiscated by the Committee for Sequestrations, and he had to pay a £1000 fine to regain them.

Under King Charles II, he was appointed a commissioner for tax collection in Leicestershire and Essex.

== Marriage and family ==
He married Mary Noel, daughter of Edward Noel, 2nd Viscount Campden.

They had nine children, seven daughters and two sons, the youngest of whom, John, was born in 1638. Their children included:

- Mary, married Thomas Beaumont, 3rd Viscount Beaumont of Swords;
- Juliana, married Sir John Tracy, 5th Baronet;
- Elizabeth, married Sir Daniel de Ligne of Harlaxton Manor;
- Penelope, married Sir Philip Tyrwhitt;
- Anne, married Sir Thomas Meres, MP for Lincoln;
- John, married Frances, daughter of Sir Geoffrey Palmer, MP for Stamford.

Erasmus died on 16 March 1672 aged 70, and is buried at Kirby Bellars.

== Appearance ==
At the Virginia Museum of Fine Arts, located in Richmond, Virginia, (Elegance and Wonder: Masterpieces of European Art from the Jordan and Thomas A. Saunders III Collection) a portrait of Erasmus and his sister, Elizabeth de la Fontaine (later de Linge) is displayed. He was fifteen when this portrait was completed. According to this portrait, he had sandy blond hair, a round face, and brown eyes.
