= Thomas Vautor =

English madrigalist

Thomas Vautor (fl. 1592–1619) was an English musician remembered as a composer of madrigals such as Sweet Suffolk Owl. His only known publication appeared in 1619, quite late in the history of the English Madrigal School.

== Life ==
Vautor was a household musician in the family of Mary Beaumont, of Glenfield, Leicestershire; and held the same position to Sir George Villiers after his marriage with her in 1592. The couple were the parents of the future George Villiers, 1st Duke of Buckingham.

On 11 May 1616, Vautor supplicated for the degree of Mus. Bac. at the University of Oxford, which was granted on condition of his composing a choral hymn for six voices; he was admitted on 4 July. At this time the younger George Villiers, son of Vautor's patrons, was rising in the favour of King James I, and in 1619 was created Marquess of Buckingham, Vautor dedicated to the Marquess a collection of 22 madrigals, entitled The First Set; being Songs of diverse Ayres and Natures for Five and Sixe parts; Apt for Vyols and Voices. Nothing further is known of Vautor.

== Works ==
A list of the 22 pieces was in Edward Francis Rimbault's Bibliotheca Madrigaliana. They are diverse, and were composed over an extended period of time; they also run a gamut of styles from the Elizabethan period to the contemporary. Some commemorate Elizabeth I, Henry Frederick, Prince of Wales, and Thomas Beaumont. One madrigal is based on a sonnet by Sir Philip Sidney.
