= Tondo (art) =

Renaissance term for a circular work of art

Fra Angelico and Fra Filippo Lippi, Adoration of the Magi, c. 1440/1460, National Gallery of Art

A tondo (pl.: tondi or tondos) is a Renaissance term for a circular work of art, either a painting or a sculpture. The word derives from the Italian rotondo, "round". The term is usually not used in English for small round paintings, but only those over about 60 cm (two feet) in diameter, thus excluding many round portrait miniatures – for sculpture the threshold is rather lower.

A circular or oval relief sculpture is also called a roundel. The infrequently-encountered synonym rondo usually refers to the musical form. In architecture, the term tondo is reserved for a blank oval or roundel; one containing ornamentation or imagery is called a medallion.

== History ==
Artists have created tondi since Greek antiquity. The circular paintings in the centre of painted vases of that period are known as tondi, and the inside of the broad low winecup called a kylix also lent itself to circular enframed compositions. Although the earliest true Renaissance, or late Gothic painted tondo is Burgundian, from Champmol (of a Pietà by Jean Malouel of 1400–1415, now in the Louvre), the tondo became fashionable in 15th-century Florence, revived as a classical form especially in architecture.

It may also have developed from the smaller desco da parto or birthing tray. The desco da parto by Masaccio from around 1423 may be one of the first to use linear perspective, another feature of the Renaissance. Also using linear perspective was Donatello for the stucco tondi created around 1435–1440 for the Sagrestia Vecchia at the Basilica of San Lorenzo designed by Brunelleschi, one of the most prominent buildings of the Early Renaissance. For Brunelleschi's Hospital of the Innocents already (1421–24), Andrea della Robbia provided glazed terracotta babes in swaddling clothes in tondos with plain blue backgrounds to be set in the spandrels of the arches. Andrea and Luca della Robbia created glazed terracotta tondi that were often framed in a wreath of fruit and leaves, which were intended for immuring in a stuccoed wall. Filippo Lippi's Bartolini Tondo (1452–1453) was one of the earliest examples of such paintings.

In painting Botticelli created many examples, both Madonnas and narrative scenes, as did Raphael. According to art historian Roberta Olson, Michelangelo's "only documented and securely attributed panel painting" was a tondo -- the Doni Tondo at the Uffizi. Michelangelo also created, at the time he was sculpting his David, two carved marble tondi -- the Taddei Tondo and the Pitti Tondo.

In the sixteenth century the painterly style of istoriato decoration for maiolica wares was applied to large circular dishes (see also charger). Since then it has been less common. In Ford Madox Brown's painting The Last of England, the ship's wire railing curving round the figures helps enclose the composition within its tondo shape.

== Examples ==
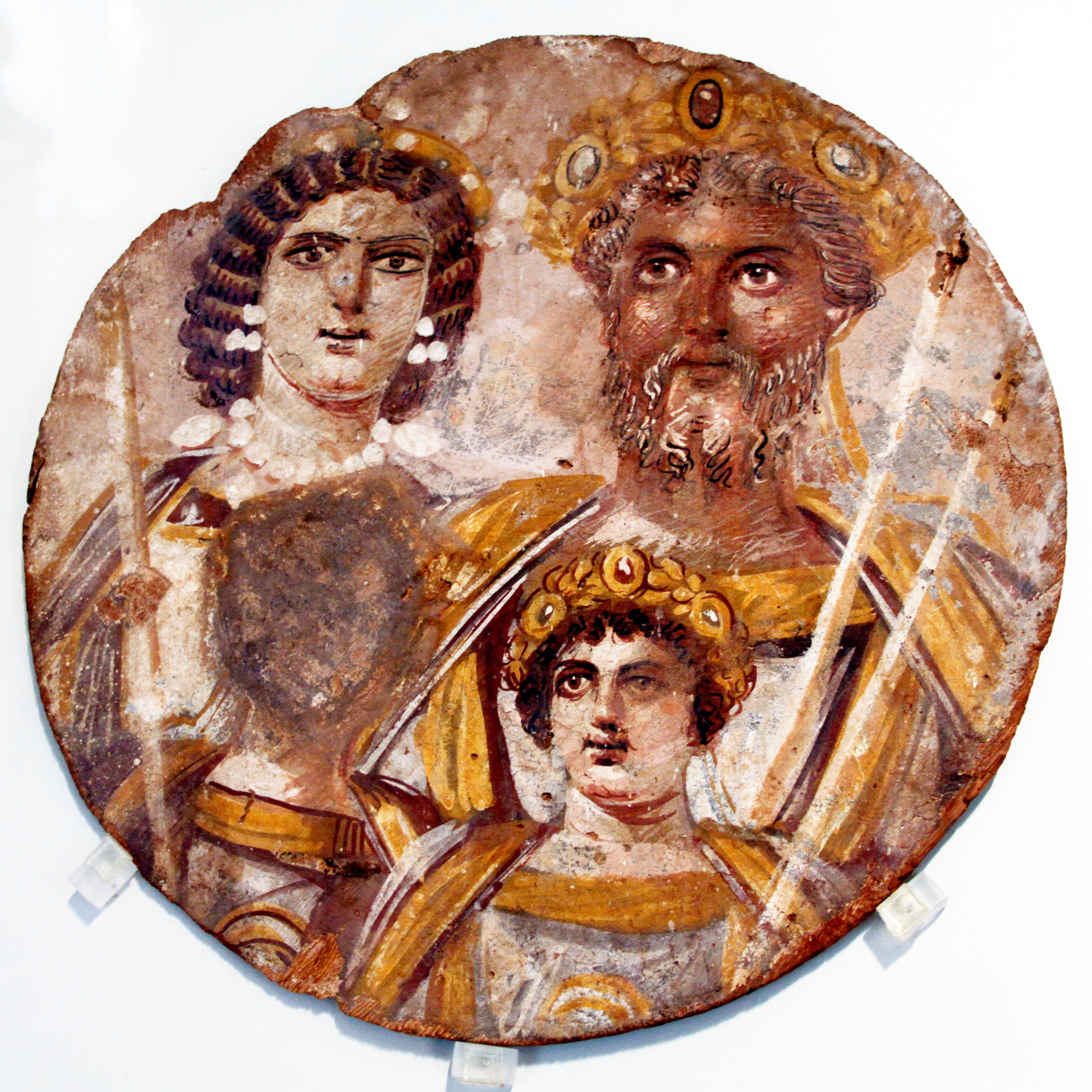
Portrait of family of Septimius Severus, so-called Severan Tondo, Roman painting of c. 200 AD, Altes Museum, Berlin

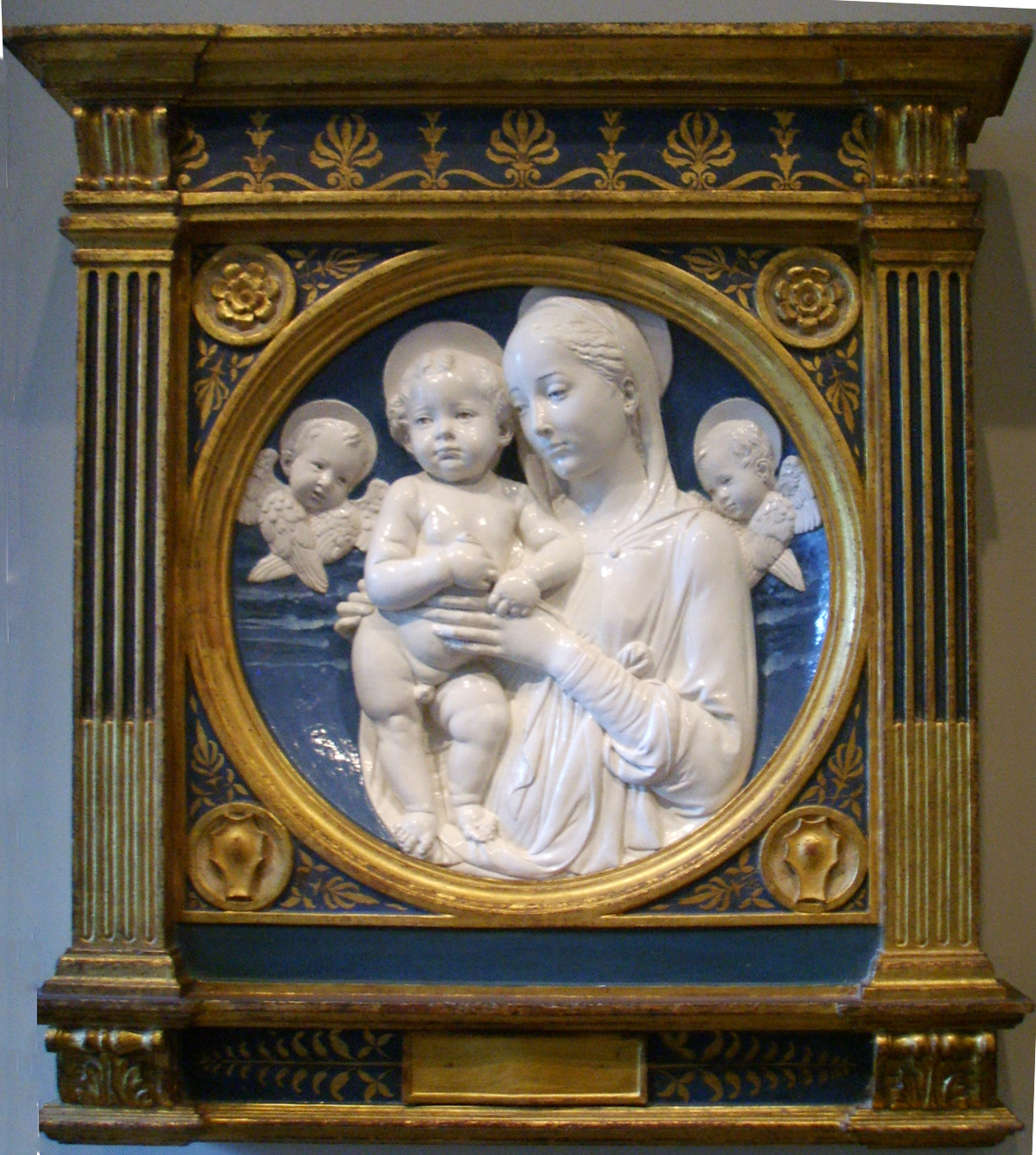
Andrea della Robbia, Madonna and Child with Cherubin, 1485

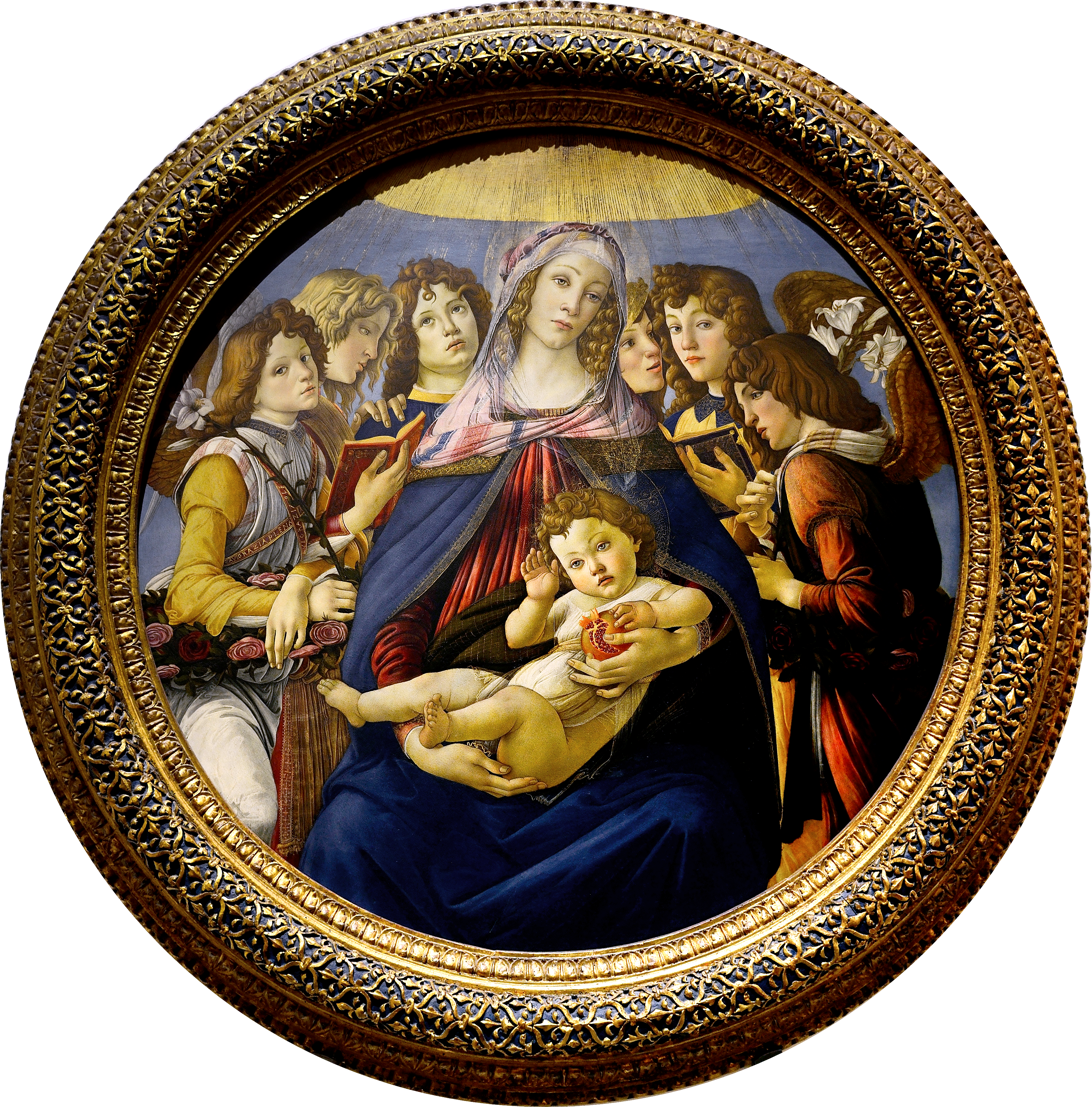
Sandro Botticelli, Madonna of the Pomegranate, c. 1487, tempera on panel, 143.5 cm diameter, Uffizi, Florence

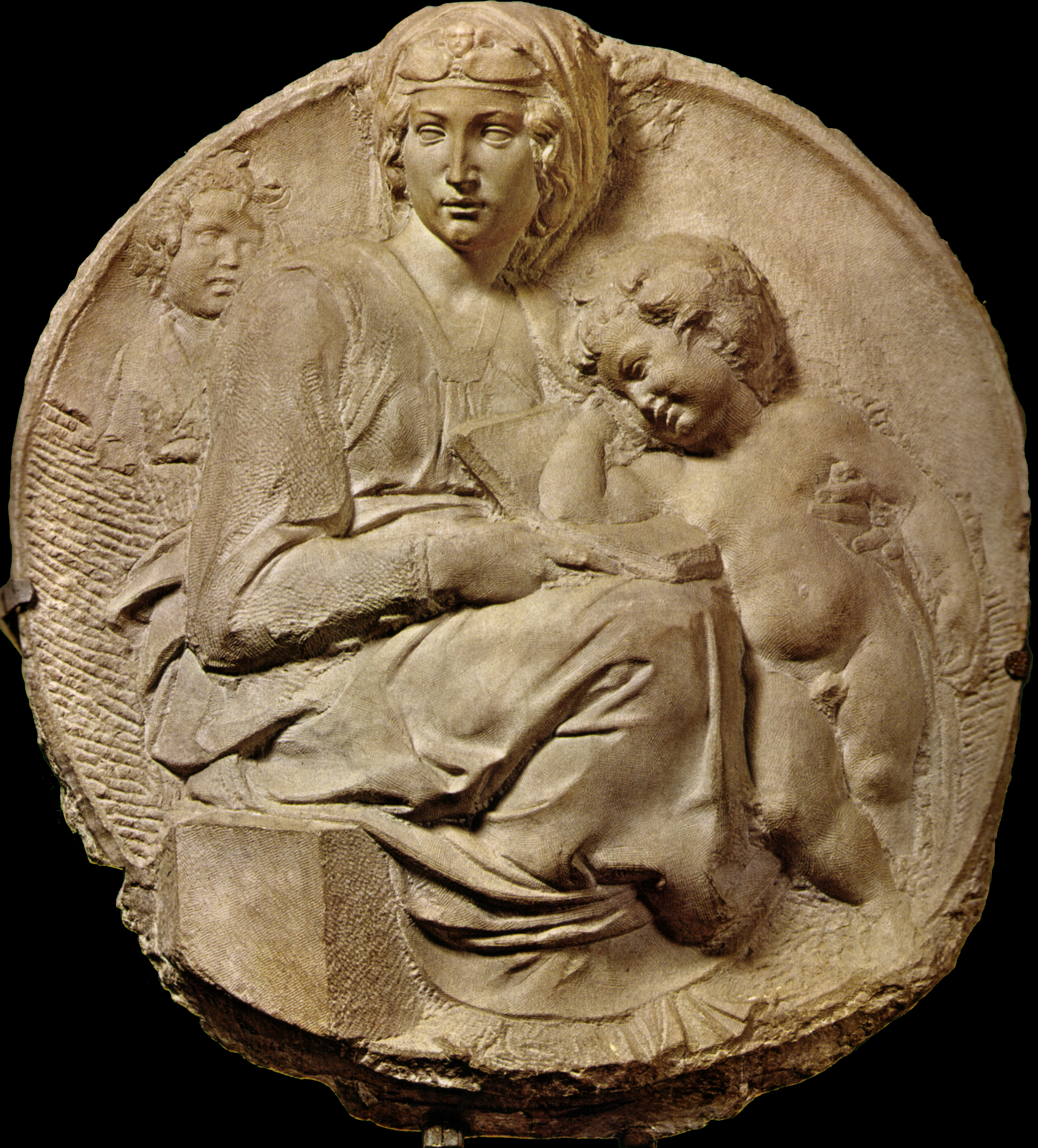
Michelangelo, Pitti Tondo, c. 1504–05, Uffizi

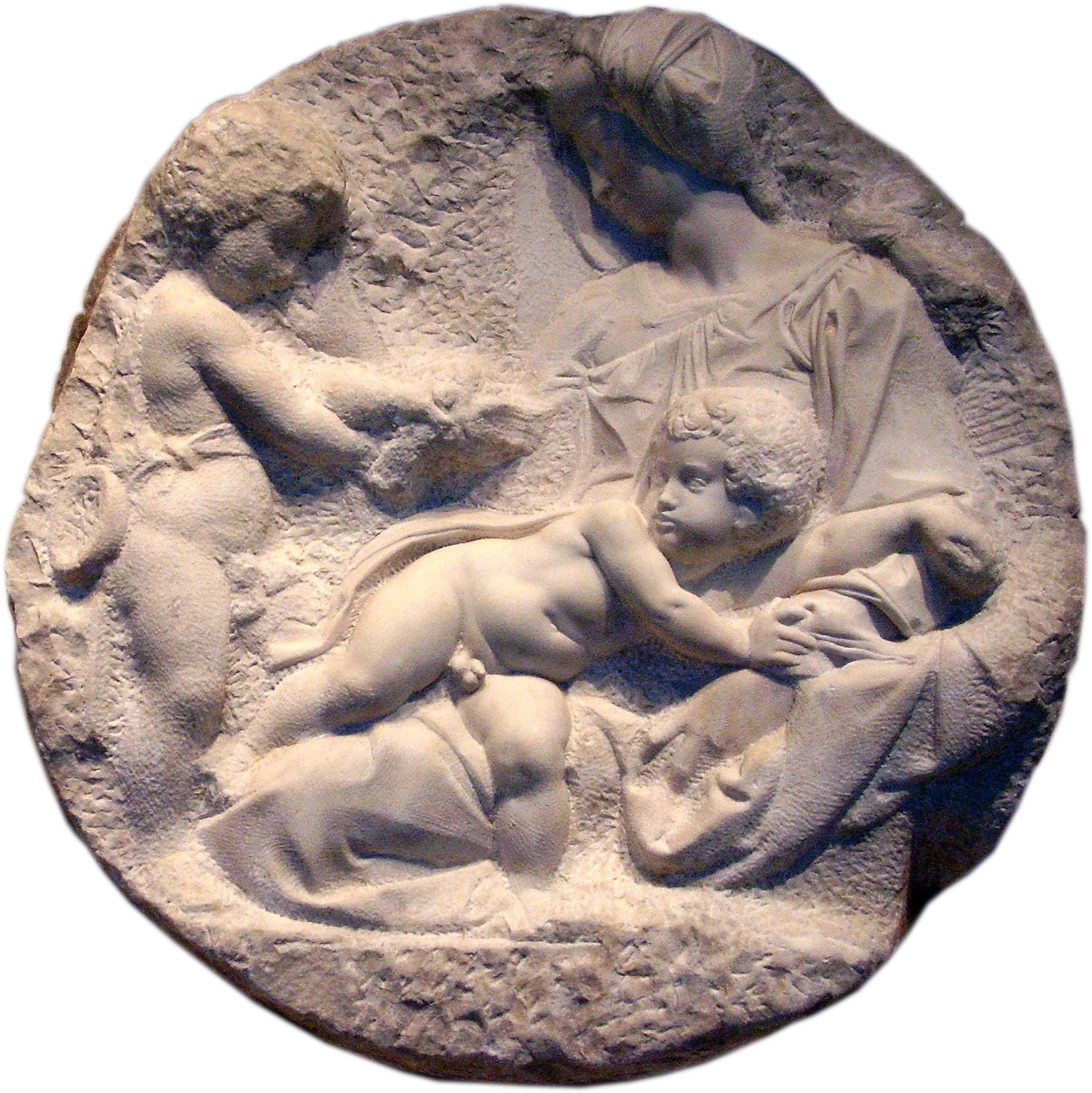
Michelangelo, Taddei Tondo, marble relief, c. 1504–05, Royal Academy, London

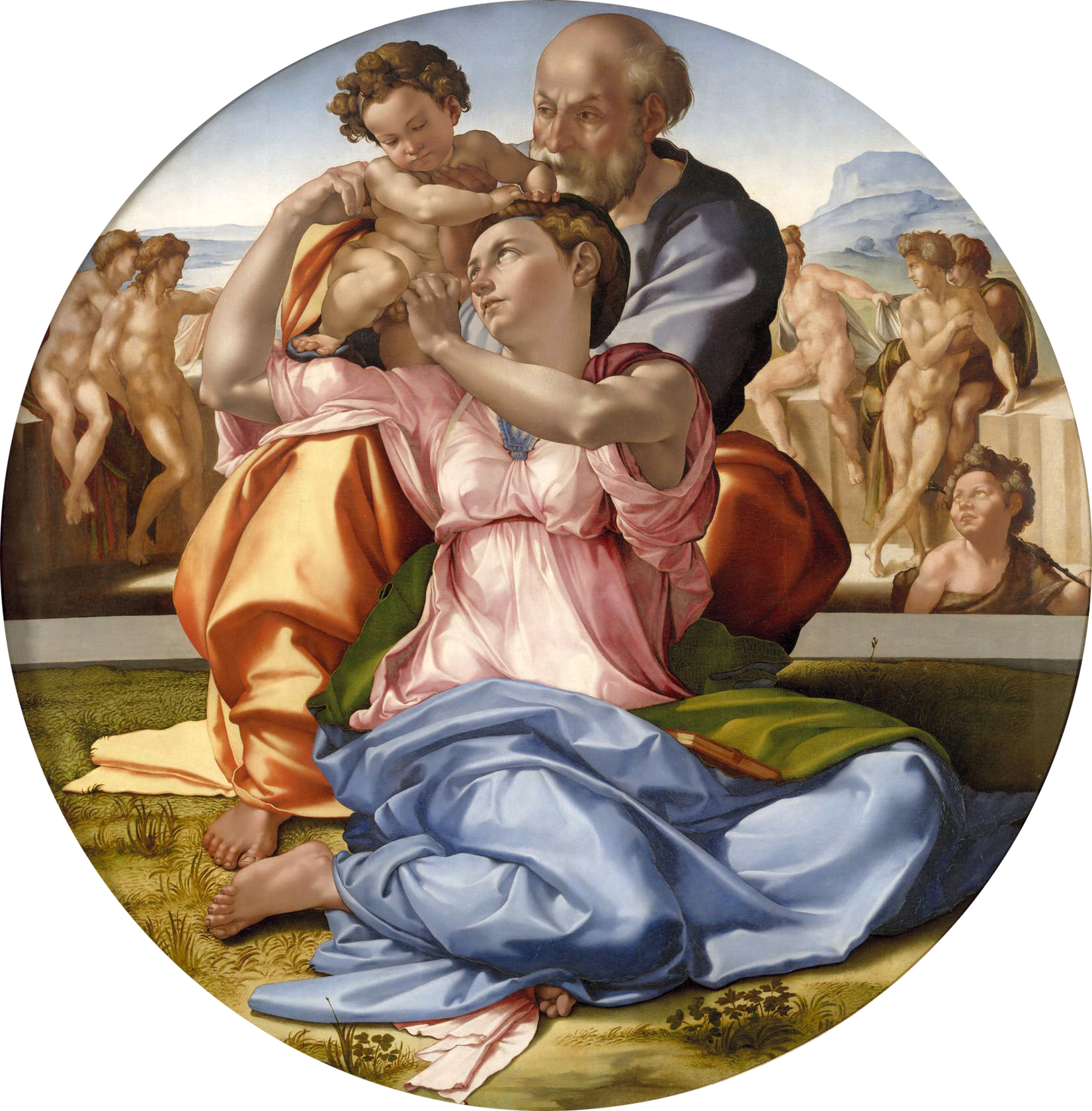
Michelangelo, Doni Tondo, c. 1507, Uffizi

Jean-Auguste-Dominique Ingres, The Turkish Bath

== See also ==
- Medallion (architecture): round or oval
- Cartouche (design): oval
- Panel painting: normally rectangular or capsule-shaped
