= Weston Otmoor =

Proposed town in Oxfordshire, United Kingdom

Coordinates: 51.862°N 1.208°W

Latest proposal (2008). Key: 1. New railway station linking Weston Otmoor to Oxford, Milton Keynes and London; 2. Trams for travel within the eco-town; 3. 6,000 space rail-based Park & Ride to Oxford, Bicester, Milton Keynes or London; 4. Replacement of the A34/M40 junction will ease pressure on these routes and surrounding villages; 5. Single point of access into and out of Weston Otmoor linking directly onto the rebuilt A34/M40 junction; 6. Woodland buffer around the perimeter of the site; 7. Retained woodland; 8. Parks, woodlands and allotments; 9. New marsh habitat; 10. High street with shops, schools, healthcare, leisure and business facilities

Weston Otmoor was a proposed new eco-town in the north of Oxfordshire, England, in countryside to the east of the village of Weston-on-the-Green. It would have been next to Junction 9 of the M40 motorway and 7 miles (11 km) north of Oxford and was one of 15 bids shortlisted by the Department of Communities and Local Government on 3 April 2008. Eco-towns were subject to a consultation by the Department of Communities and Local Government ending 30 June 2008.

== Principal features ==
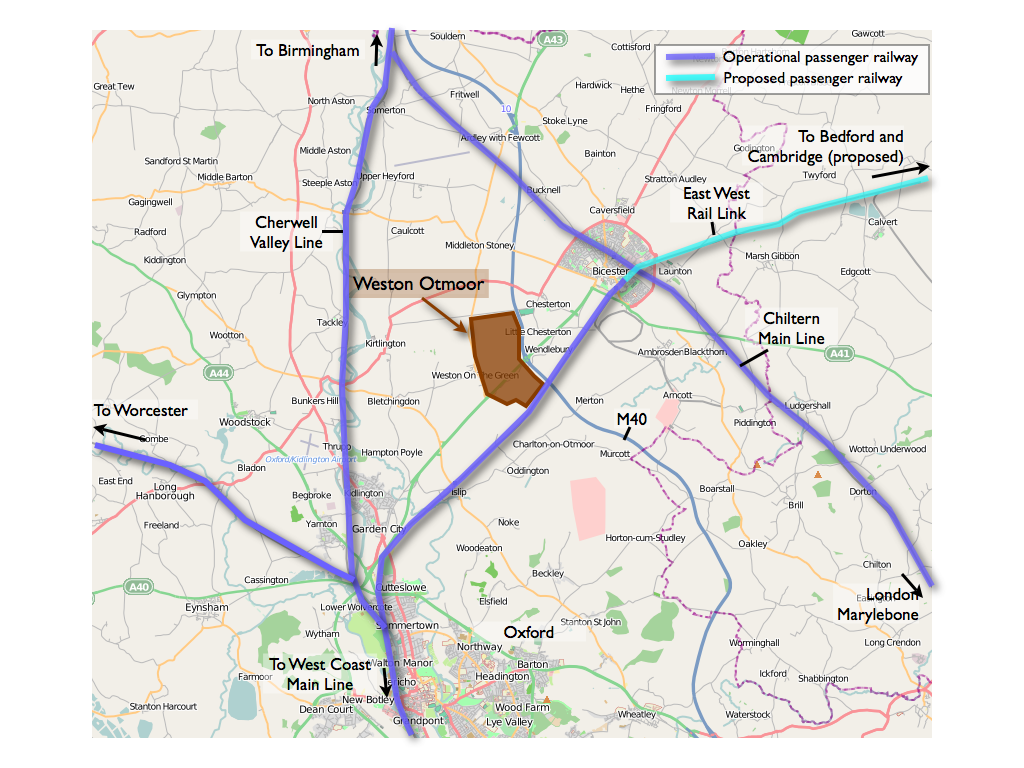
location of the proposed settlement showing railway lines

Shortlist Proposal

Located 7 miles (11 km) north of Oxford next to Junction 9 of the M40 motorway.

- 828 hectares, 2,046 acres (8.28 km^{2}). 84% of this is working farmland. The other 16% is an entirely grass airfield. 250ha is within the Oxford greenbelt
- 35,000 people
- 15,000 dwellings (10,000 initially)
- 12,000 jobs (Few details have been published)
- An inhabited bridge over the A34 dual carriageway, taking inspiration from Birmingham and Florence, will be the signature architectural feature.
- The prospective developer is Parkridge Holdings UK.

Detailed plans for the half of the site southeast of the A34 await further ecological study. This area includes the Woodsides Meadow Nature Reserve (Wendlebury Meads) and ancient woodland.

=== Elimination of the car ===
An eco-town feature was to be the transport system:

- There would be a single point of road traffic entry/exit for the whole town near J9 of the A34/M40.
- It was envisaged that the majority of workers in this town would commute either by car, bus or train to work. The commutes would vary from 10 miles (16 km) [Oxford] to 70 miles (110 km) [London]
- It was thought that Prologis, the parent company of Parkridge Developments would base a transport depot at this location giving trucks/lorries easy access to the region's road and motorway network. The ecological/environmental impact of this development was yet to be determined.
- Travel within the town was to be by free tram. Homes were never to be more than 200m from a stop.
- Travel to Oxford and Bicester was to be free by train from a new station and improved railway line. The proposed East West Rail is planned to open by 2025 and might provide this route. The funding source for this feature was yet to be determined at the time.
- There will be a park and ride service from J9 of the M40.

=== Small communities ===
Small schools were to be located throughout the town and will be a focus of the urban architecture.

- Many small shops so that they are never far from any home.
- A "proper" high street.

=== Layout ===
There were to be extensive green spaces ("green infrastructure") and allotment gardens for all. This will require a substantial land area and is not visible on the proposal plans.

There were to be a large commercial area for offices and industry. No detail of commerce/industry was given in proposals. The environmental and ecological impact of these areas has not been established.

=== Energy and environment ===
- A proposed combined heat and power (CHP) station in the NW corner of the site.
- Waste disposal innovation.
- Water management innovation.

=== Housing ===
Housing was to be located in a compact, high population density urban core of 220 hectares (540 acres).

- The distribution of dwelling types was to provide a greater proportion of affordable housing.

== Summary of published criticism ==
=== Unsustainable, unrealistic ===
Figures for expected car ownership and traffic flows are unavailable from the developers. This renders an objective assessment of whether the proposal meets eco-town exemplary transport criteria impossible and the ongoing government consultation meaningless.

Normally 15,000 dwellings would be expected to generate 10,000 car journeys at peak hours. A 100% modal shift to rail was asserted to be completely unrealistic. It seemed therefore highly likely the proposal would break the eco-town rules for sustainability and for exemplary design given the existing levels of road congestion at the site.

=== Inappropriate, unnecessary ===
Oxfordshire County Council policy is to concentrate development around the county towns, not on working farmland.

Cherwell District Council has already planned for 12,000 new houses over the next two decades and these are to be sited to develop and support existing towns.

The developers suggest that a completely new town must be built because attempts to improve transport and housing in Oxford have failed, not because they are an impossibility.

Other more appropriate sites exist, such as the entirely brownfield RAF Upper Heyford.

Unemployment in both Cherwell District and Oxfordshire is half the national average. New jobs are not needed and would have to be taken from elsewhere.

=== Impact on existing towns ===
Bicester suffers from lack of infrastructure, limited social and community facilities, and a town centre that is in dire need of development. Resource competition would have a negative impact, as it also would on nearby Kidlington.

=== Water stress ===
The site is on a flood plain and in an area of high "water stress" or shortage. It drains into the River Ray and thence, after 3 km, into the River Cherwell which frequently floods in winter. Increased water run-off will flood the village of Islip and Otmoor, an RSPB nature reserve and area of semi-wetland. The small village of Wendlebury, half a mile from the proposed site, is often subject to in-house flooding. The water flows from the site towards and into the village. Building on this flood plain will only exacerbate the problem.

=== Ecological impact ===
By using an entirely greenfield site, the eco-town rule requiring a "net benefit in landscape and bio-diversity" is immediately broken. The proposal is by definition not an eco-town.

25% of the site is within the Oxford greenbelt and much of Weston on the Green is within a conservation area.

Development would destroy the Woodsides Meadow Nature Reserve, a Site of Special Scientific Interest, and ancient woodland. The site is almost entirely working farmland with hedgerows and crops that sustain diverse wildlife.

The dramatic rise in food prices requires a large increase in agricultural output. " Farmland will be just too important for greenfield development".

The development includes a power station for Combined Heat and Power. A 300 megawatt gas fired cogeneration plant would emit up to 1,800 tonnes of carbon dioxide greenhouse gas per day. If run on wood chips, it would consume 5,000 tonnes daily. If run on rubbish, it would consume all of Oxfordshire's annual output. Prevailing winds will carry any particulate fallout and pollutants from the proposed power station (NW corner of site) over Bicester. Unless the power station runs on biomass, the town will violate the eco-town zero carbon rule.

The proposed eco-town will not have "higher order" facilities (those of a larger town such as Oxford) and would thus increase car use. Currently the villages of Wendlebury, Chesterton, Islip and Woodeaton suffer increasing traffic due to the establishment of a 'rat run' with motorists avoiding the heavily congested A34/A41. The construction of Western Otmoor would further add to the over-use of the rural road network in this area of North Oxfordshire.

=== Sociological aspects ===
If eco-towns are not created where the jobs and services are, we will create ghettos

"It may be better to look at the possibility of creating eco-extensions to existing communities, rather than completely new towns."

The distinguished designer and broadcaster, Kevin McCloud (Grand Designs), is building two eco-suburbs of 200 homes each in Swindon. He regards these developments as experimental and aims "not to create ring-fenced ghettos but to focus on the social and physical relationships between Hab projects and the wider community". Eco-town design is in its infancy and Weston Otmoor is far too big to be used as an experiment.

The eco-town will not have the retail or leisure facilities of a large town such as Oxford. One of the few benefits for low-income families of living in a large city is that many facilities, often free of charge or discounted, are on their doorstep or a short bus ride away. This will not be the case for the eco-town in the middle of the countryside. The bias towards low-income households, the elimination of cars and the lack of facilities appear designed to increase the deprivation of already disadvantaged families and to contain them in a rural ghetto.
