= Hanley Grange =

Coordinates: 52.10°N 0.19°E

Hanley Grange is the name given to an eco-town planned for land north of Hinxton in South Cambridgeshire. Initial proposals for 8,000 homes rising to 12,800 homes were published.

The site proposed to be developed is on Grade 2 agricultural land, owned in part by a development company, Jarrow Investments, which works closely with supermarket giant Tesco.

== Opposition ==
Local opposition through the Stop Hanley Grange Group of Parish Councils, is focused on lack of infrastructure, overbuilding already in Cambridgeshire, and the proposal that the development of the eco town concept on such a scale is best dealt with through an alternative scheme at Northstowe, north of Cambridge.

The petition launched against the Hanley Grange plan was signed by Top Gear presenters Jeremy Clarkson, James May and Richard Hammond on 18 May 2008 at the Red Lion Pub at Hinxton, Cambs.

On Wednesday 16 July 2008, a significant landowner, the Wellcome Trust announced it was not proceeding with the Hanley Grange eco-town proposal. On 24 July 2008, Tesco, through their agent Jarrow Investments, said they intend to continue with an application for an eco-town on 264 hectares under their control. Revised plans provide for 6,500 houses.
