= Pitti Tondo =

Sculpture by Michelangelo

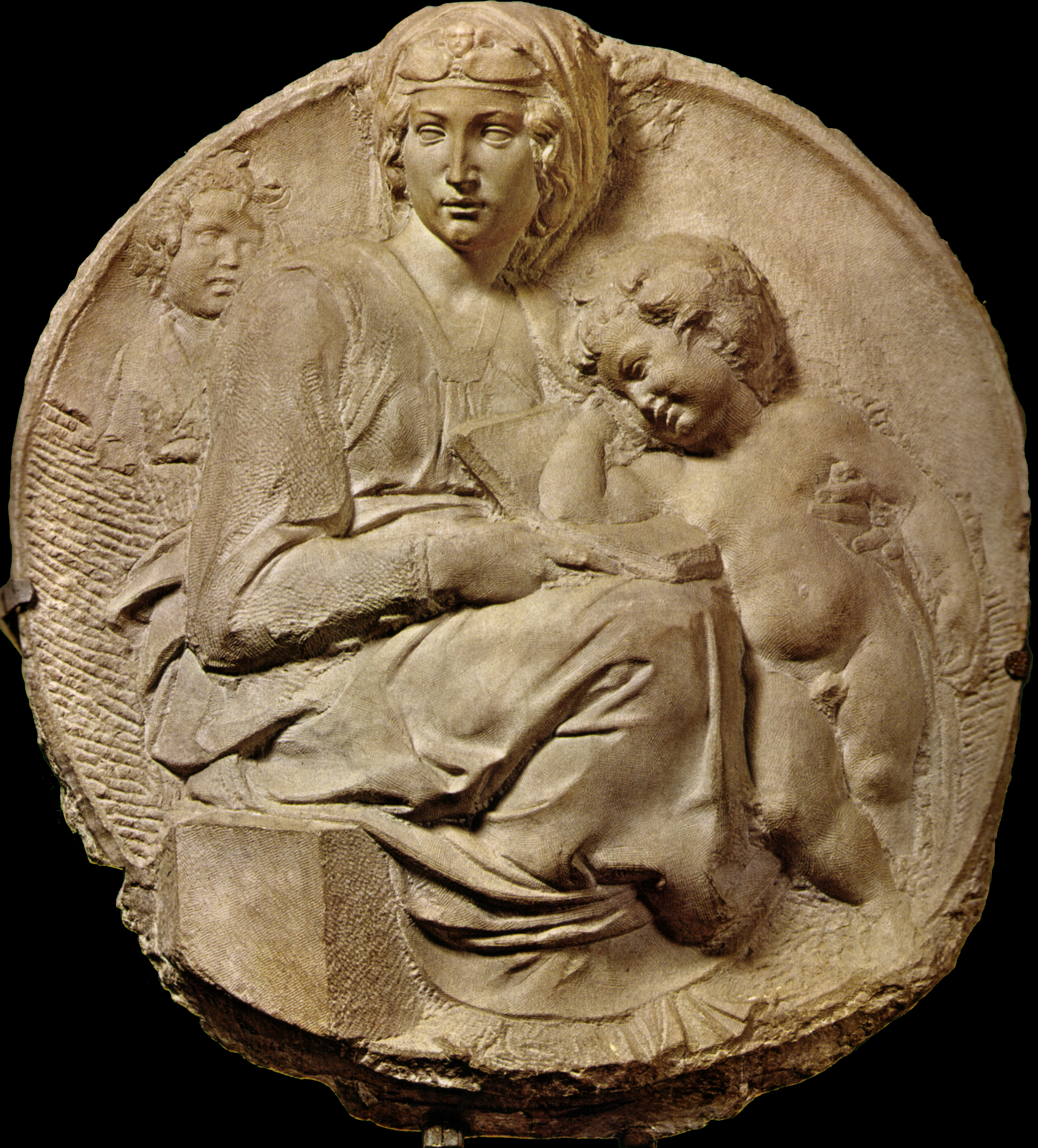
- Casting of the bas-relief by Michelangelo held in the Pushkin Museum in Florence
- Artist: Michelangelo Buonarroti
- Year: c. 1503–1505
- Medium: Marble
- Dimensions: 82 cm × 82 cm (32 in × 32 in)
- Location: Museo nazionale del Bargello, Florence
- Preceded by: Madonna of Bruges
- Followed by: Taddei Tondo

The Pitti Tondo (Tondo Pitti) is an unfinished marble relief of the Virgin and Child by Michelangelo in round or tondo form. It was executed between 1503 and 1504 while he was residing in Florence and is now in the Museo nazionale del Bargello in Florence.

== History ==
The tondo was worked on during the year in which Michelangelo sculpted his David, having found the time to dedicate to some other paid private commissions. The work was not completed before Michelangelo left Florence for Rome, and never to return. Many details are missing and the sides of the work are not polished.

This sculpture was commissioned by Bartolomeo Pitti. His son Miniato, a monk at Monte Oliveto, donated it to Luigi Guicciardini (1487–1551). In 1564, the art historian, Benedetto Varchi, saw the work in the house of Guicciardini's nephew, Piero. In 1823, the tondo was bought by the Florentine authorities for 200 scudi, from the shop of the dealer Fedele Acciai.

The tondo entered the collection of the Museo nazionale del Bargello in 1873 and was placed where it resides, in the Galleria degli Uffizi.

== Description and style ==
In the unfinished tondo only the heads of Mary and of the baby Jesus are in high relief. Mary is depicted with an open book on her knees. Detail of her eyes is not complete, as in the typical style of Michelangelo, but interpretations suggest that her gaze seems distracted, as if she is looking into the distance and meditating on the fate of her son that is foretold in the scriptures she is reading. The cherub upon Mary's forehead symbolizes her knowledge of the prophecies, as is found in the terracotta relief, Madonna with Child, that is attributed to Donatello of Padua and dated to c. 1440. The baby Jesus leans on her in a lively contrapposto and just visible emerging in the background, is a young Saint John the Baptist.

Apparently, Michelangelo also was influenced by the now-lost cartoon of Saint Anne by Leonardo da Vinci that was exhibited in Florence at the Santissima Annunziata during the years Michelangelo was working on the sculpture. Both works are based on the interaction between the figures.

The central figure of the composition is Mary, sitting on a cube block (resembling that in Michelangelo's Madonna of the Stairs). Interpretations have suggested that she seems to bend over in order to fill the space allotted by the tondo and that her posture gives an impression that she desires to escape from the scene depicted.

Her head, in high relief, projects both outward and upward beyond the border of the tondo and turns left to break the rigidity of the vertical axis of her body. The contrast between the unfinished figure of John the Baptist and the relief of the Virgin also gives the work depth.

== See also ==
- List of works by Michelangelo
- Taddei Tondo

== Bibliography ==
- Gonzáles, Marta Alvarez (2007). Michelangelo (in Italian). Milan: Mondadori Arte.
- Baldini, Umberto (1973). Michelangelo scultore (in Italian). Milan: Rizzoli.
