= Taddei Tondo =

Sculpture by Michelangelo

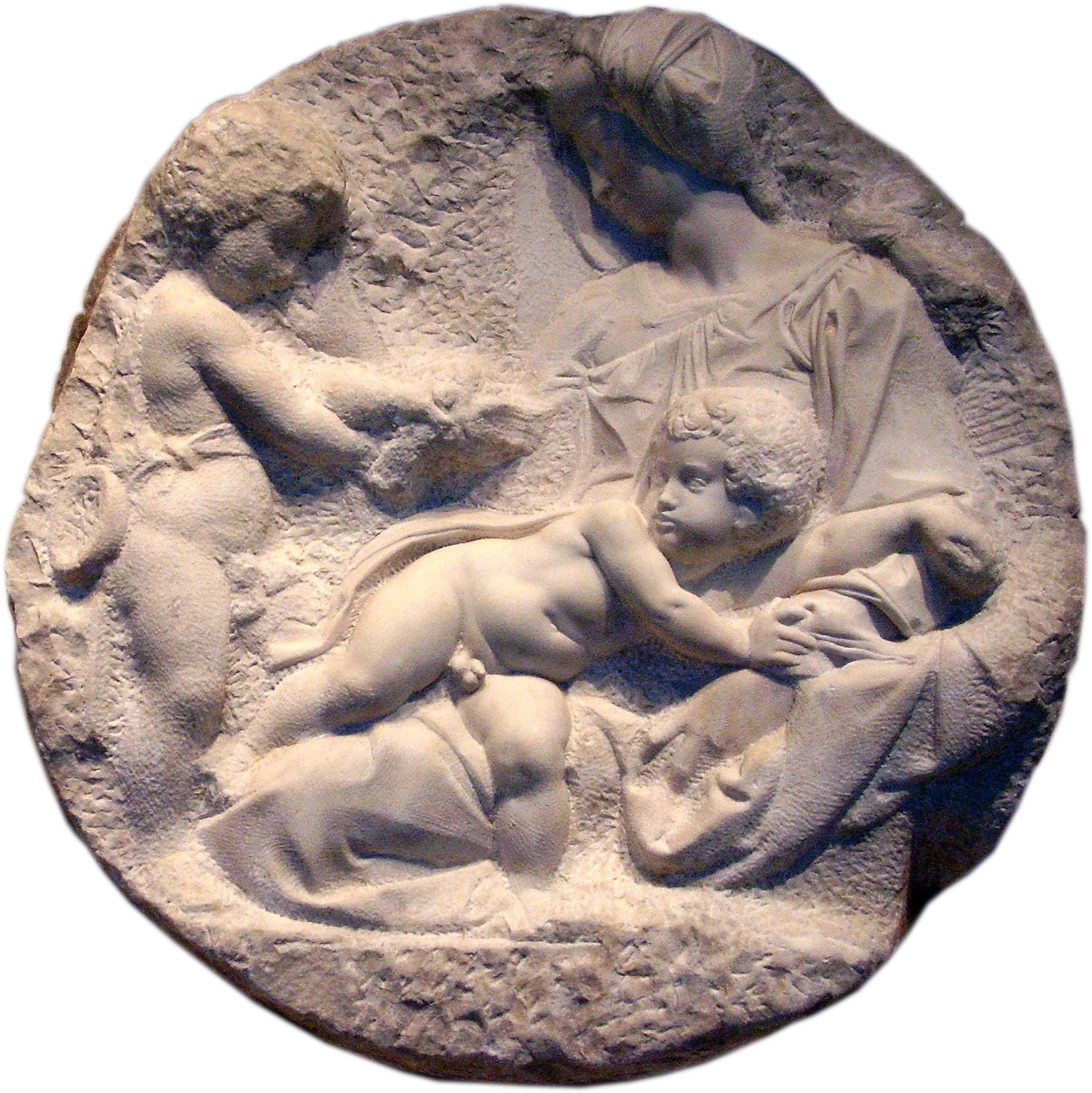
- Artist: Michelangelo
- Year: c. 1504–05
- Type: Carrara marble
- Dimensions: diameter 106.8 centimetres (42.0 in), depth of carving 7.5 centimetres (3.0 in) to 22 centimetres (8.7 in)
- Location: Royal Academy, London
- Preceded by: Pitti Tondo
- Followed by: St. Matthew (Michelangelo)

The Taddei Tondo or The Virgin and Child with the Infant St. John is an unfinished marble relief tondo (circular composition) of the Madonna and Child and the infant Saint John the Baptist, by the Italian Renaissance artist Michelangelo Buonarroti. It is in the permanent collection of the Royal Academy of Arts in London. The tondo is the only marble sculpture by Michelangelo in Great Britain. A "perfect demonstration" of his carving technique, the work delivers a "powerful emotional and narrative punch".

== Physical history ==
The tondo dates to Michelangelo's time in Florence before his move to Rome in 1505. According to the art historian, Vasari, while working on his David, Michelangelo "also at this time... blocked out but did not finish two marble tondi, one for Taddeo Taddei, today in his house, and for Bartolomeo Pitti he began another... which works were considered outstanding and marvellous". (Note: "et ancora in questo tempo abbozzò e non finì due tondi di marmo, uno a Taddeo Taddei, oggi in casa sua, et a Bartolomeo Pitti ne cominciò un altro... le quali opere furono tenute egregie e mirabili")

To the lower right of the back of the relief is a ligature combining the letters L and A, probably the mark of another carver or dealer, considered most likely to be the initials of Lapo d'Antonio di Lapo, active at the Opera del Duomo and for a short period in 1506-1507, one of Michelangelo's assistants. A chisel blow on the reverse seemingly from this earlier phase resulted in a hairline crack in the face of the Virgin that may only have become apparent as carving progressed. In consideration of his motivation to continue working on the damaged marble after that was obvious, speculation exists about whether Michelangelo, known for his concern for his materials, was constrained by a shortage of ready alternatives, or, considering his success with the damaged block for David, was more accepting of flaws because he was confident in his ability to work around them. The missing segment to the bottom right may be a result of an excess of his celebrated "direct attack". At some point, however, work on the tondo ceased. Five holes in the outer rim of the tondo were intended for fixings and are variously dated.

Although unfinished, the tondo appeared in the Palazzo Taddei and is documented as still there in 1568, but by 1678, the family had moved to a new residence near San Remigio. At an unknown date the tondo was taken to Rome, where it was acquired from Jean-Baptiste Wicar by Sir George Beaumont in 1822. Initially hung at Beaumont's house in Grosvenor Square, it was bequeathed to the academy in 1830 and installed at Somerset House, before moving with the academy to the east wing of the new National Gallery building in 1836, where it remained until the academy relocated to Burlington House in 1868. Except for an exhibition at the Victoria and Albert Museum in 1960, the tondo has been housed and displayed in various academy locations ever since.

The discovery of the hairline crack running through the upper half of the marble contributed to the decision in 1989 to provide a permanent home for the tondo. Subsequently the tondo was cleaned with dichloromethane swabs and clay poultices to remove residues of nineteenth-century plaster casts and their oil-based release agents, packing materials, traces of beeswax and pine resin adhesives, and other surface accretions. The tondo was left unwaxed and no other coating was applied, as the work is not "finished" and originally had not been polished (as was the David when finished). Since the opening of the Sackler Wing of Galleries in 1991, the tondo has been on free public display in an area designed for it on the top floor that was positioned for reasons of preventive conservation behind protective glass, to combat the effects of air pollution and the possibility of vandalism.

== Description ==
The tondo as a format for painting and relief sculpture was a quintessential product of the Florentine Renaissance. During the century after 1430, all the leading artists created tondi, including Filippo Lippi, Botticelli, Luca Signorelli, Piero di Cosimo, Fra Bartolomeo, Andrea del Sarto, Leonardo da Vinci (in a lost work), and Raphael. For a few years Michelangelo also experimented with the form. He executed the Doni tondo, his only panel painting documented in contemporary sources, and he also began two unfinished tondo sculptures, the Pitti and Taddei tondi, but after that he never returned to the tondo form in either medium.

This tondo depicts a seated Virgin Mary with the baby Jesus dynamically sprawled across her lap, turning and looking back over his right shoulder toward the infant Saint John the Baptist, who stands before him looking down and holding a fluttering bird. When viewing the composition, the eye of the viewer is drawn diagonally along Christ's body, back up that of his mother, follows her gaze across to John, and from his face back to Christ. John, patron saint of Florence, with his attribute of a baptismal bowl, crosses his arms, perhaps in allusion to the cross. Most likely the bird he holds is a goldfinch not a dove - Christian symbolism sees in this bird a representation of the Passion. The unfinished portion of the marble below the bird might have been intended to become a crown of thorns.

Michelangelo's execution with only a point and claw chisel, often driven hard and with great energy, is a combination of techniques that helps create a sense of "surface unity" unbroken by the use of the drill. The Christ child, almost completely in full relief is the only figure that is highly finished (except for the feet), St. John is much less finished, Mary is the least finished, and the background is only roughly executed. One critic declares a belief that these marked variations in texture help establish the relative status of the three figures while creating a sense of compositional depth all the greater for not being more conventionally "finished".

Many of Michelangelo's works are unfinished. Circumstances around each being unfinished vary. Critical opinions address some of his unfinished works as if completed, however. The nineteenth-century French sculptor and critic Eugène Guillaume declared that, what he labeled as Michelangelo's "non finito", was "one of the master's expressive devices in his quest for infinite suggestiveness".

== Influence and reception ==
The tondo was commissioned by Taddeo Taddei. He was a patron and friend of Raphael, a young contemporary to Michelangelo also working in Florence. Raphael studied and reworked the tondo in two drawings, the versi of The Storming of Perugia now at the Louvre as well as compositional studies for the Madonna del Prato now at Chatsworth House. Raphael also applied the concept of Michelangelo's twisting body of the Christ child stretching across his mother's lap in Bridgewater Madonna.

Shortly after its arrival in England, Michelangelo's tondo was sketched by Wilkie, who wrote to Beaumont "your important acquisition of the basso-relievo of Michael Angelo is still the chief talk of all our artists. It is indeed a great addition to our stock of art, and is the only work that has appeared in this northern latitude to justify the great reputation of its author". Cockerell noted in his diary how "the subject seems growing from the marble & emerging into life. It assumes by degrees its shape, features from an unformed mass, as it were you trace & watch its birth from the sculptor's mind".

Following its arrival at the Royal Academy, the tondo was sketched by Constable, who published a letter in the Athenaeum of 3 July 1830 praising the way it was lit, "showing the more finished parts to advantage, and causing those less perfect to become masses of shadow, having at a distance all the effect of a rich picture in chiaroscuro". With its differing degrees of finish the tondo is an outstanding technical study piece; plaster casts may be found at the Victoria and Albert Museum and Fitzwilliam Museum.

== Gallery ==
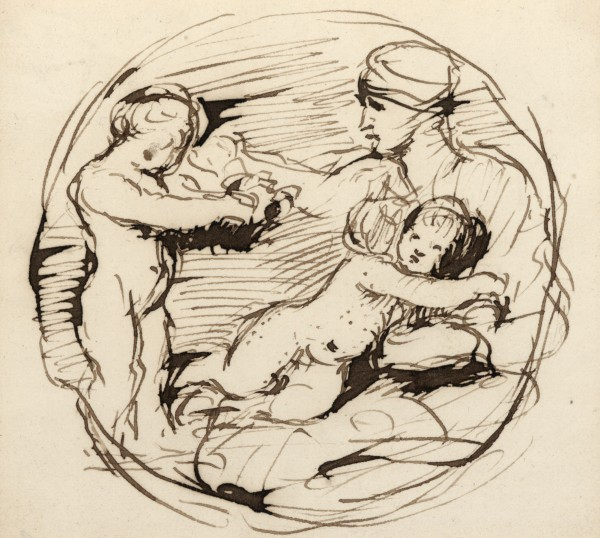
Sketch by Sir David Wilkie (c.1823)

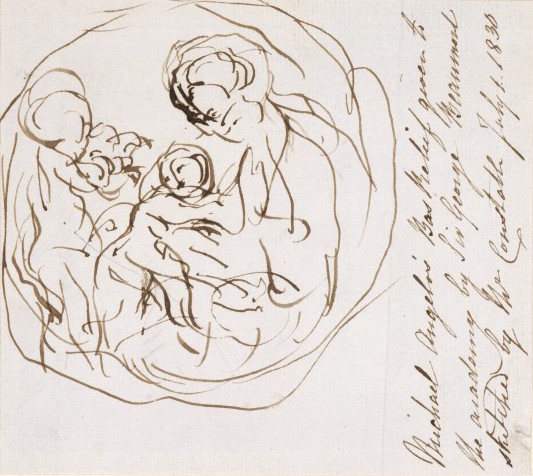
Sketch by John Constable (1830)

== See also ==
- List of works by Michelangelo
- Pitti Tondo
- Doni Tondo
