= The Coleorton Masque =

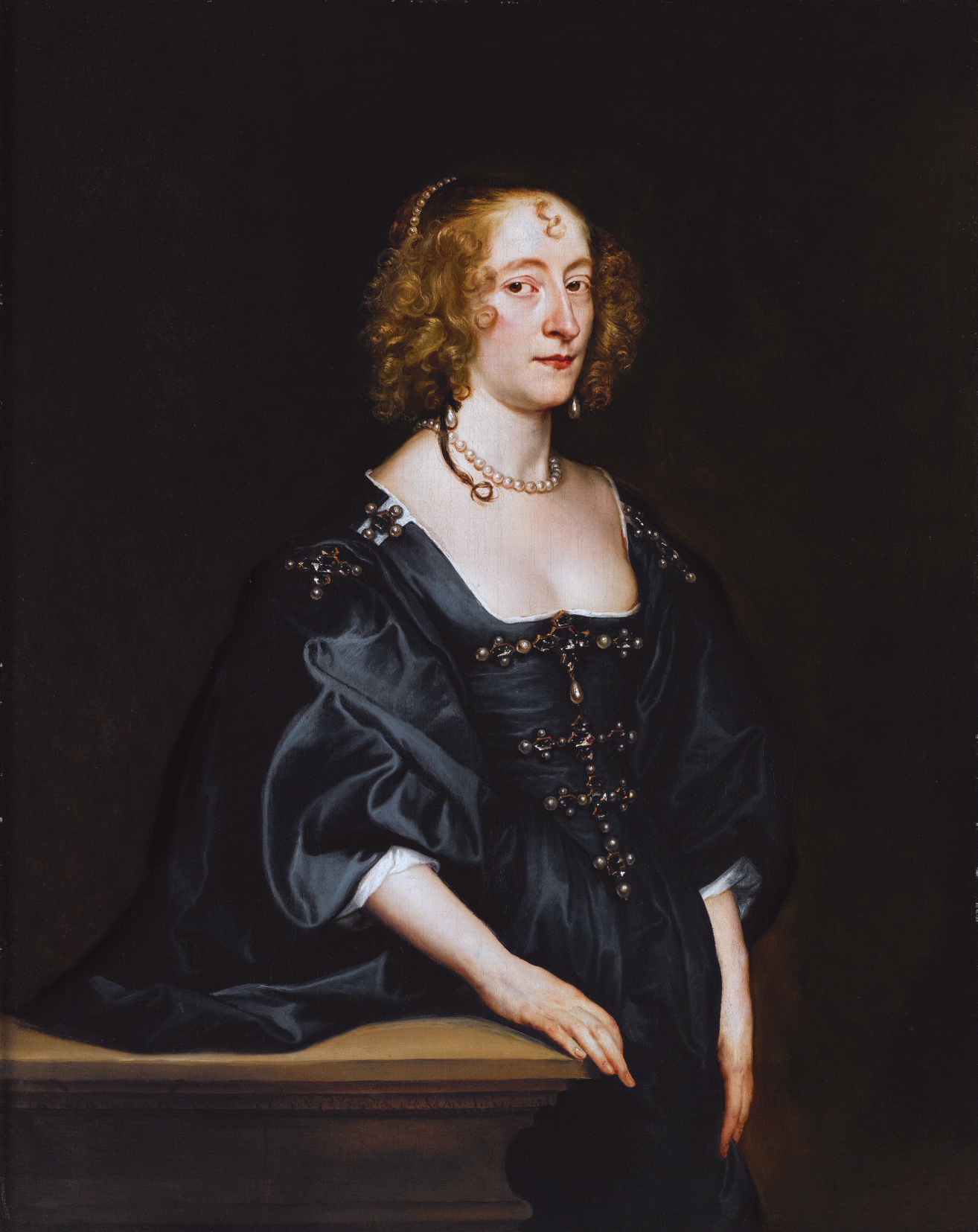
Frances Seymour, later Duchess of Somerset

The Coleorton Masque is an English country house entertainment performed on 2 February 1618, sometimes known as The Fairies' Farewell: The Masque at Coleorton.

== Context ==
Thomas Beaumont produced a masque entertainment at Coleorton Hall in Leicestershire on 2 February 1618, in honour of William Seymour, (later Duke of Somerset), and his wife Frances. The author may have been a local vicar Thomas Pestell, though John Fletcher and Arthur Wilson have also been suggested.

== Summary ==
The antimasque is a dialogue between Bob, the local spirit of the house's buttery, and the fairy Puck. There has been a perceived decline in standards of country house hospitality and housekeeping, and instead, new ostentation in clothing (estate woods are sold to buy farthingales and meadows for petticoats). Puck introduces "black fairies", "the dancing spirits of the pits", a reference to new mining industries and coal at Coleorton.

The masque is a contest between male and female values. Favonius, the West Wind, gives a speech praising masculine chivalric values and is surprised by six female masque performers led by Iris, "Mistress Rainbow", with Meekness, Simplicity, Truth-in-Love, Modesty, and Chastity, to show the "precedency of female virtue". Their song:

Brave Amazonian Dames
Made no count of Mankind but
for a fit to be at the Rut.
free fire gives the brightest flames;
Men's overawing tames,
And Pedantlike our active Spirits smother.
Learn, Virgins, to live free;
Alas, would it might be,
women could live & lie with one another!

The "brave Amazonian dames" dance. Six male masque dancers appear and after a song recommending the mixture of cold and warm qualities, the twelve masquers dance together.

== Cast ==
The heading of the text gives the names of the masque performers, six men and six women:

A maske presented on Candlemas nighte at Coleorton, by the earle of Essex, the lorde Willobie, Sr Tho. Beaumont, Sr Walter Devereux, Mr Christopher Denham, Mr Walter T..., Mrs Ann R..., Mrs An Burnebye, Mrs Susann Burnebye, Mrs Elizabeth Beaumont, Mrs Katherine Beaumont, Mrs Susann Pilkingetun, to Sr William Semer and the ladie Francis Semer.
