= Sir George Beaumont, 7th Baronet =

British art patron and amateur painter

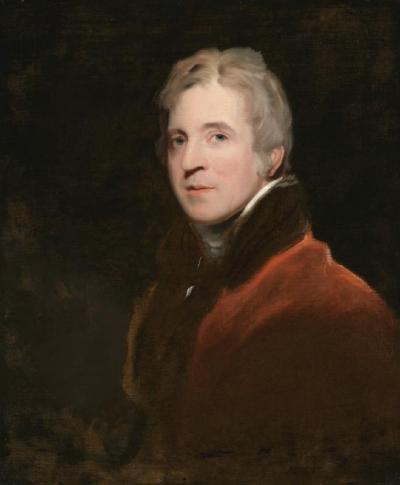
- Portrait by Sir Thomas Lawrence

Member of Parliament for Bere Alston
- In office 1790–1796
- Preceded by: Viscount Feilding
- Succeeded by: William Mitford

Personal details
- Born: 6 September 1753 Dunmow, Essex, England
- Died: 7 February 1827 (aged 73) Coleorton, Leicestershire, England

Sir George Howland Beaumont, 7th Baronet (6 November 1753 – 7 February 1827) was a British art patron and amateur painter. He played a crucial part in the creation of London's National Gallery by making the first bequest of paintings to that institution.

== Biography ==
Born in Great Dunmow, Essex, he was the only surviving child of the landowner Sir George Beaumont, 6th Baronet, from whom he inherited the baronetcy in 1762 (see Beaumont baronets) and Rachel [nee Howland] daughter of Michael Howland of Stone Hall, Matching Green. Beaumont was educated at Eton College, where he was taught drawing by the landscape painter Alexander Cozens.

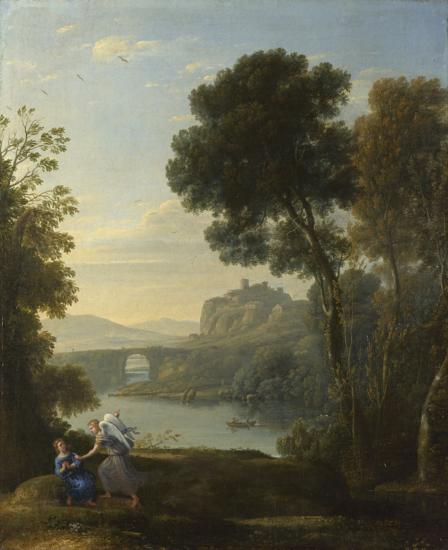
Landscape with Hagar and the Angel (Claude, 1646), Beaumont's favourite painting

The first paintings to enter Beaumont's collection were by artists he knew, but a Grand Tour which he undertook in 1782 with his wife Margaret (the daughter of John Willes M.P., of Astrop, Oxon and granddaughter of Sir John Willes M.P., Chief Justice of the Court of Common Pleas) widened his taste to include the Old Masters. On his return he began to assemble a collection of Old Master paintings despite his relatively modest means. His first important acquisition was A Landscape with Hagar and the Angel by Claude Lorrain, and this always remained his favourite painting, accompanying him on coach journeys in a specially designed case.

In 1785 Lady Beaumont inherited the lease of 34 Grosvenor Square, which provided the Beaumonts with a much-needed escape from the tedium of Dunmow and introduced them to a more diverse social circle. This circle expanded when Beaumont became Tory MP for Beer Alston in Devon from 1790 to 1796, but his enthusiasm for politics was short-lived and he soon returned to his artistic pursuits. A picture gallery was added to the house in 1792 to accommodate their growing art collection. Despite the cool reception by critics of an early work, A View of Keswick (1779), Beaumont became a frequent exhibitor at the Royal Academy from 1794 to 1825, eventually earning a reputation as the leading amateur painter of his day.

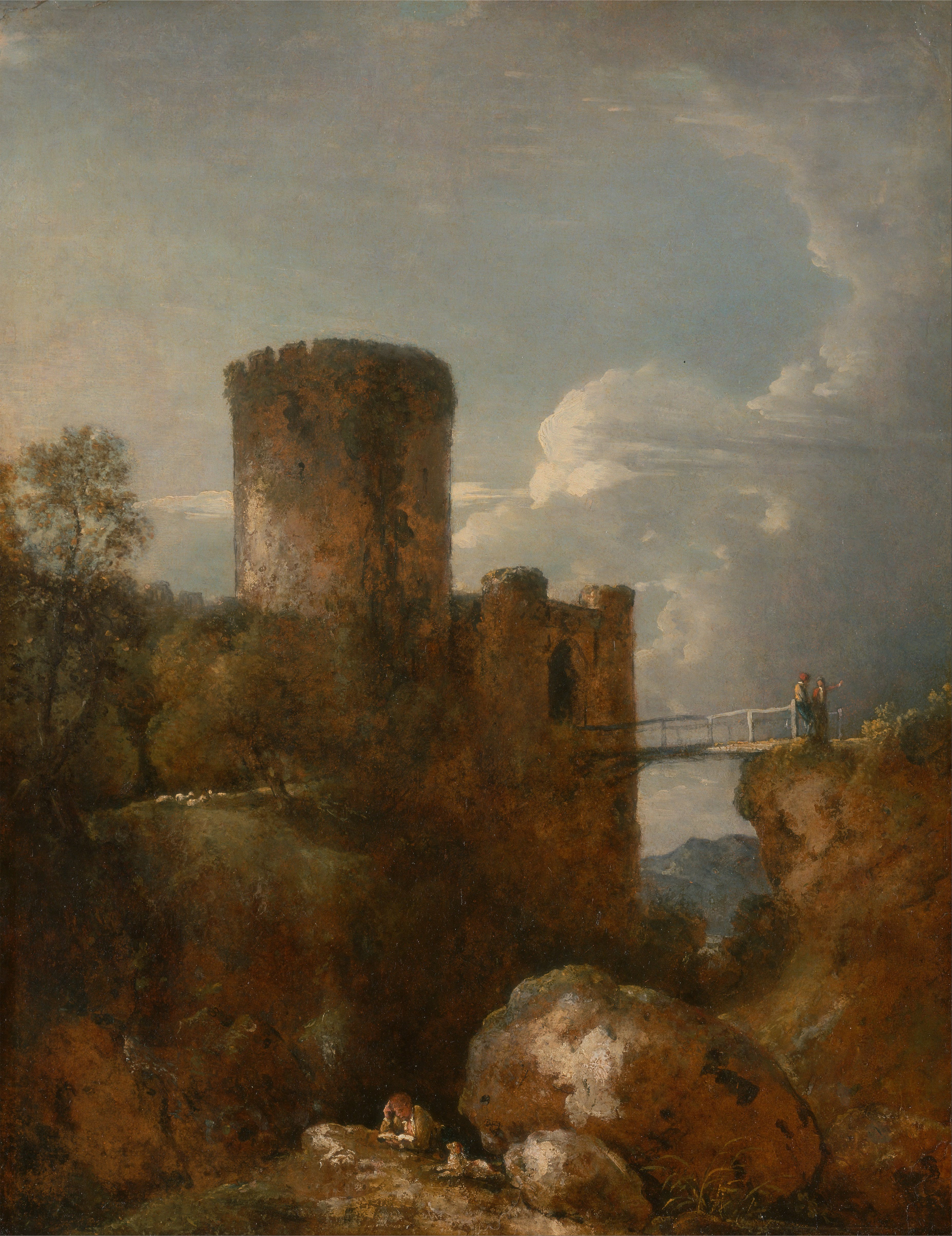
Conway Castle (Beaumont, 1809)

The Beaumonts went on frequent sketching tours of the Lake District and of North Wales, necessitated by Sir George's having caught a fever during his Grand Tour. For their Welsh excursions they rented Benarth, a house near Conwy, where they were visited by Uvedale Price among others. Price had a great influence on Beaumont's taste, awakening his interest in the Picturesque movement and in Flemish and Dutch painting and landscaping the grounds at Coleorton Hall, Beaumont's country house in Leicestershire. Coleorton was later to become Beaumont's main place of residence, and was rebuilt to a design by George Dance the Younger from 1804 to 1808. A friend of the Lake Poets, with whom he considered himself a kindred spirit, Beaumont lent out the farm of the estate to William Wordsworth and his family in the winter of 1806. They were briefly joined there by Samuel Taylor Coleridge, but Beaumont was unable to establish the same rapport with this poet as with Wordsworth, who proved a lifelong friend.

The 1800s saw Beaumont being promoted to influential posts in what were effectively committees of artistic taste: he sat on the monuments committee for St Paul's Cathedral from 1802 and was one of the founding directors of the British Institution (established in 1805). Despite his openness for romantic poetry, Beaumont was less receptive of new developments in painting. A staunch defender of the academic ethos of Sir Joshua Reynolds, he was one of J. M. W. Turner's most vehement critics, regularly denouncing his handling of colour. This oppressive stance on matters of taste was to earn him the epithet of "supreme Dictator on Works of Art" from his old friend Thomas Hearne. Nonetheless, Beaumont did welcome some sympathetic artists, including the young John Constable, to study the Old Masters in his collection. The most famous fruit of Beaumont's patronage is the Constable's painting of the cenotaph erected to Reynolds in the grounds at Coleorton (painted 1833–6; now in the National Gallery).

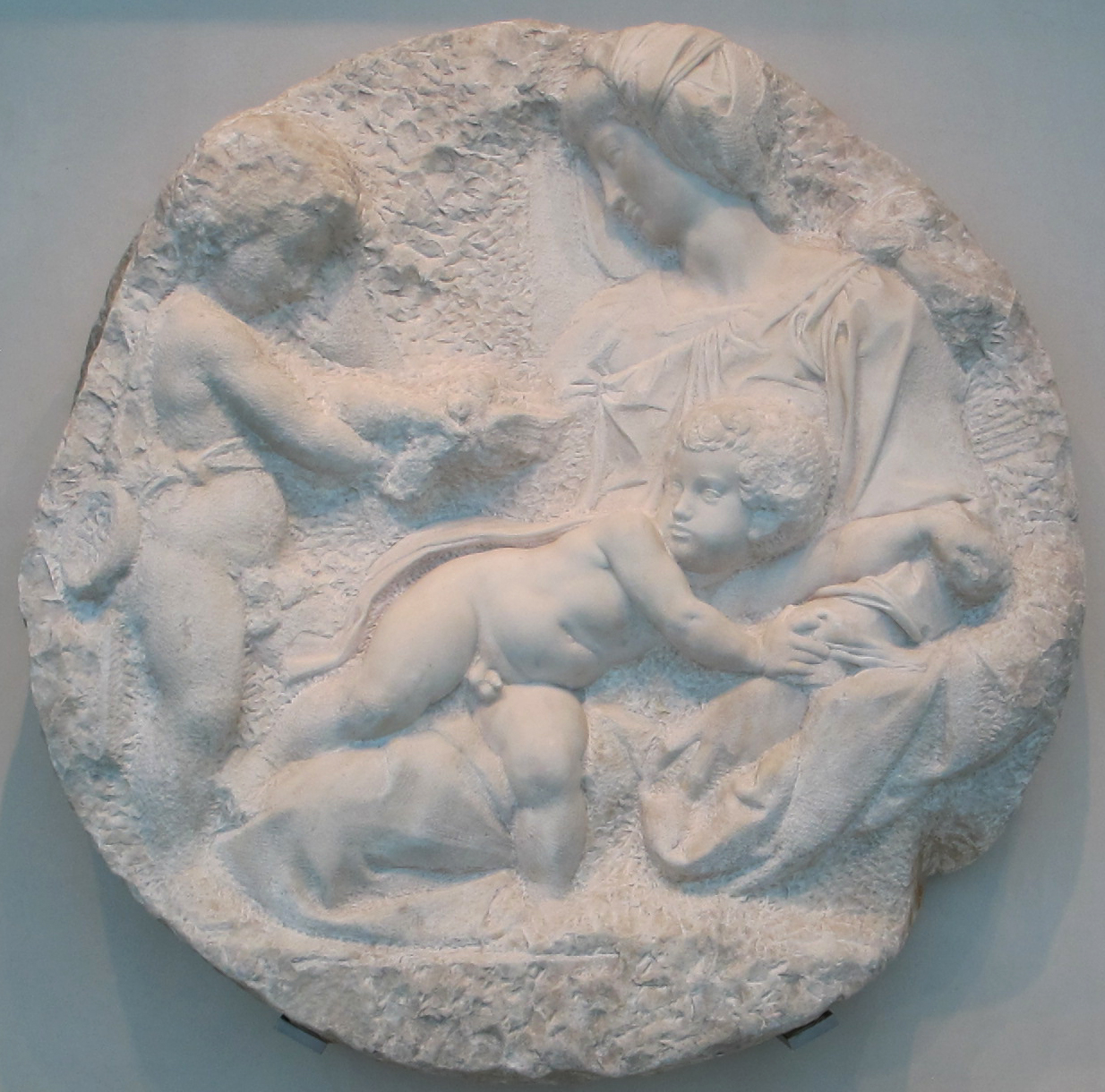
Taddei Tondo (Michelangelo, c. 1504–5)

He was a founding member of the British Institution in 1805, which in 1815 upset many British artists by a preface to the catalogue of their exhibition of Old Masters, implying rather too strongly that British artists had a lot to learn from them. The publication in 1815–16 of a series of satirical "Catalogues Raisonnés", probably by Robert Smirke, ridiculed Beaumont for his conservatism, after which he retired from public life to Coleorton. A visit to Italy in 1821 in which he met Antonio Canova restored his morale, and while there he bought the Taddei Tondo by Michelangelo, which he later donated to the Royal Academy. This last stay in Italy convinced him of the need to educate British taste by establishing a public gallery of Old Masters. Upon his return Beaumont offered to give of 16 his paintings to Lord Liverpool's government on the condition that they buy the collection of John Julius Angerstein, and that a suitable building be found to house these works of art. Angerstein's collection came up for sale in 1824 and Parliament, spurred on by Beaumont's offer, bought 38 of his pictures. The National Gallery opened to the public in May 1824 in Angerstein's former house on Pall Mall, and Beaumont's paintings entered its collection the following year.

After suffering a brief illness, Sir George Beaumont died in Coleorton Hall on 7 February 1827. He was buried in Coleorton church. Some paintings by his own hand have entered the Leicester Museum & Art Gallery, while the rest remain in the Beaumont family collection. His title was inherited by his cousin George Howland Willoughby Beaumont (1799–1845).

Parliament of Great Britain
Preceded by Viscount Feilding; John Mitford	Member of Parliament for Bere Alston; 1790 – 1796; With: John Mitford	Succeeded by John Mitford; William Mitford
Baronetage of England
Preceded by George Beaumont	Baronet (of Stoughton Grange); 1762–1827	Succeeded by George Beaumont
