= Viscount Beaumont of Swords =

Viscount Beaumont of Swords, in the County of Dublin, was a title in the Peerage of Ireland. It was created on 20 May 1622 for Sir Thomas Beaumont, 1st Baronet, Member of Parliament for Leicestershire from 1604 to 1611 and High Sheriff of Leicestershire in 1610. He had already been created a baronet, of Cole Orton in the County of Leicester, in the Baronetage of England on 17 September 1619. The titles became extinct on the death of his grandson, the third Viscount in 1702.

The first Viscount was the son of Sir Henry Beaumont, Member of Parliament for Leicestershire in 1589, son of Nicholas Beaumont, MP for Leicestershire in the reign of Elizabeth I and a descendant of John Beaumont, 4th Baron Beaumont (see Baron Beaumont for earlier history of the family).

Colonel the Honourable John Beaumont, younger son of the second Viscount, was a politician and soldier involved in the Glorious Revolution.

== Viscounts Beaumont of Swords (1622) ==
- Thomas Beaumont, 1st Viscount Beaumont of Swords (died 1625)
- Sapcote Beaumont, 2nd Viscount Beaumont of Swords (1614–1658)
- Thomas Beaumont, 3rd Viscount Beaumont of Swords (1634–1702) who married Mary, daughter of Erasmus de la Fontaine

== See also ==
- Baron Beaumont
- Beaumont baronets
