= Henry Beaumont (died 1607) =

English landowner and Member of Parliament

Sir Henry Beaumont (c.1545 – 31 March 1607) was an English landowner and member of parliament.

He was the son of Nicholas Beaumont of Coleorton Hall, Leicestershire and educated at St John’s College, Cambridge (1560) and Lincoln's Inn (1566). He succeeded his father in 1585 and was knighted in 1603.

He was a justice of the peace for Leicestershire from 1584 and was appointed High Sheriff of Leicestershire for 1594–5. He was made Custos Rotulorum for the county from c.1605 until his death in 1607. He was elected MP for Leicestershire in 1588 (which convened in 1589) and again in a by-election in 1606.

He married Elizabeth, the daughter of mercer John Loveys of London and heiress to her brother Humphrey. They had one son, Thomas, who was MP for Tamworth from 1604 to 1614 and was created Viscount Beaumont of Swords.
