= Frances Seymour, Duchess of Somerset =

English noblewoman

Her Grace The Duchess of Somerset
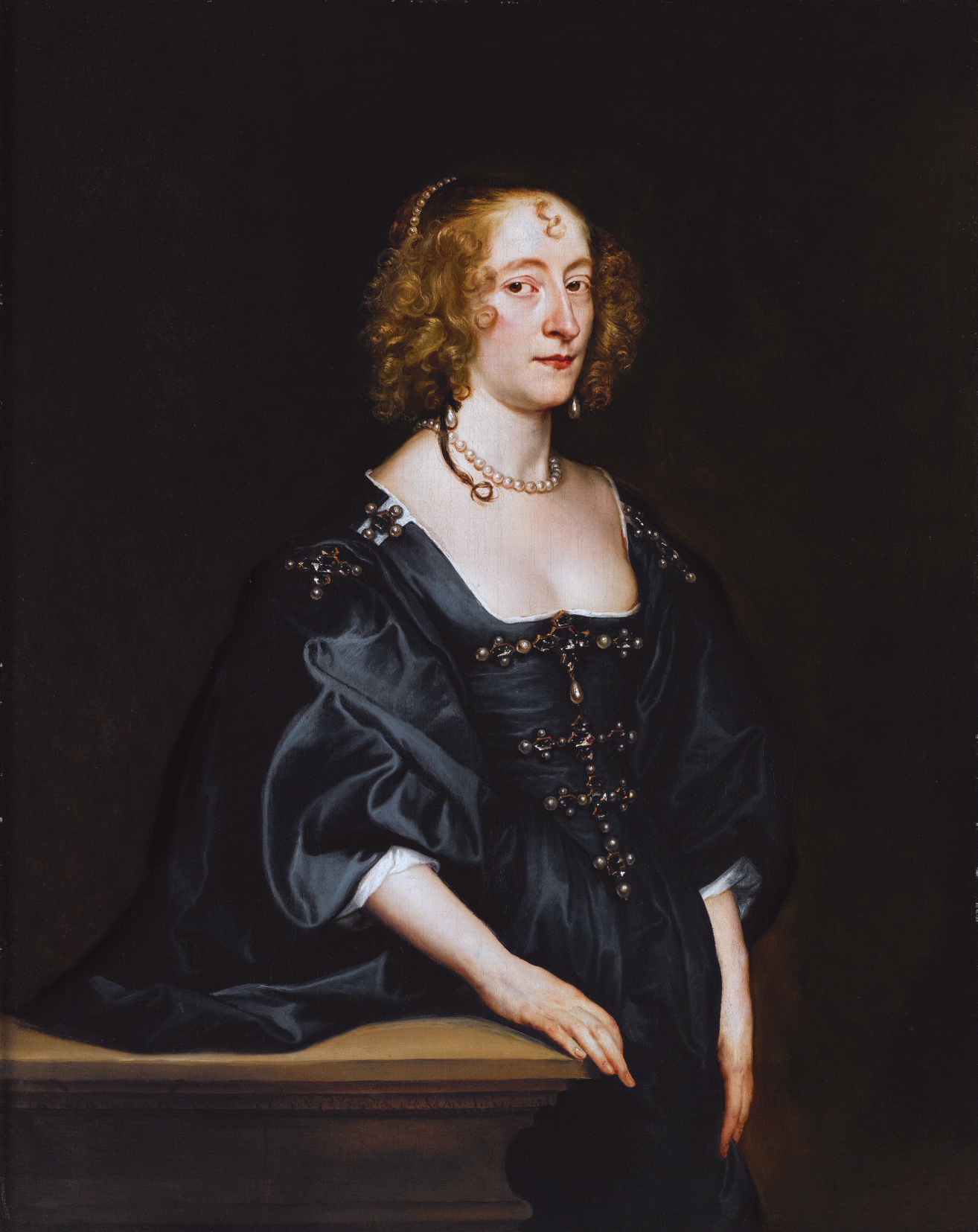
- Portrait by Anthony van Dyck
- Born: Lady Frances Devereux; 30 September 1599; Walsingham House, Seething Lane, London, England
- Died: 24 April 1674 (aged 74)
- Buried: Great Bedwyn, Wiltshire
- Noble family: Devereux (by birth); Seymour (by marriage)
- Spouse: William Seymour, 2nd Duke of Somerset
- Issue: William Seymour; Robert Seymour; Henry Seymour, Lord Beauchamp; Mary Finch, Countess of Winchelsea; Jane Boyle, Viscountess Dungarvan; Lady Frances Seymour; John Seymour, 4th Duke of Somerset
- Father: Robert Devereux, 2nd Earl of Essex
- Mother: Frances Walsingham

Frances Seymour, Duchess of Somerset (née Devereux; 30 September 1599 – 24 April 1674) was an English noblewoman who lived during the reigns of Elizabeth I, James I, Charles I and Charles II. Her father was Robert Devereux, 2nd Earl of Essex, Elizabeth I's favourite who was executed for treason in 1601. She was the second wife of William Seymour, 2nd Duke of Somerset, and the mother of his seven children.

== Early life ==
Lady Frances Devereux was born on 30 September 1599 at Walsingham House, Seething Lane, London. She was the youngest child of Robert Devereux, 2nd Earl of Essex and his wife, Frances Walsingham. Her paternal grandparents were Walter Devereux, 1st Earl of Essex and Lettice Knollys, and her maternal grandparents were Sir Francis Walsingham, Queen Elizabeth's trusted spymaster, and Ursula St. Barbe.

At the time of Frances's birth, her father, who was a former favourite of Queen Elizabeth and Lord Lieutenant of Ireland, was under arrest for treasonous behaviour in the Nine Years' War during the disastrous Irish campaign in which he parleyed with the rebellious Earl of Tyrone, and thus incurred the Queen's wrath. Essex was executed on 25 February 1601 for allegedly conspiring to murder the Queen. He left behind his wife and small children; Frances was less than two years old at the time. Frances's brother was Robert Devereux, 3rd Earl of Essex, and she had an elder sister, Dorothy. She later had three younger half-siblings from her mother's third marriage in 1603 to Richard Burke, 4th Earl of Clanricarde. These were Honora, Mary and Ulick Burke, 1st Marquess of Clanricarde.

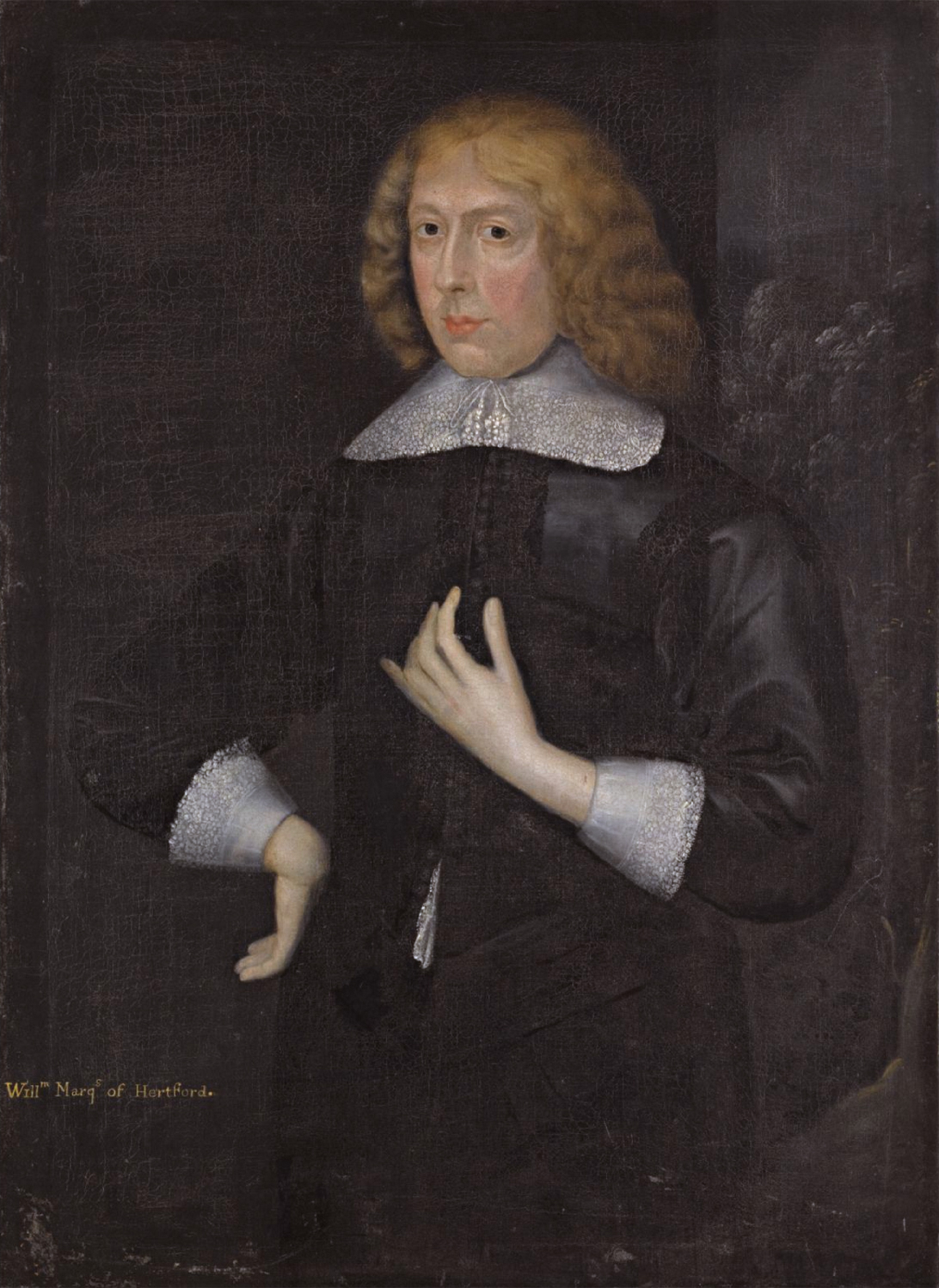
William Seymour, Marquess of Hertford, later 2nd Duke of Somerset (1588–1660), portrait attributed to Gilbert Jackson (c. 1595/1600–post-1648), private collection

== Marriage ==
On 3 March 1616, Frances married at Drayton Bassett William Seymour, 2nd Duke of Somerset (1588–1660), the son of Edward Seymour, Lord Beauchamp of Hache, and the grandson of Lady Catherine Grey. Frances was his second wife, his first having been Arbella Stuart whom he married secretly in 1610, and without permission from King James, which resulted in their imprisonment in the Tower of London. He later escaped, and fled to the Continent. In 1615, Arbella died in the Tower.

The Seymours were guests of honour at Coleorton Hall on 2 February 1618 and entertained by The Coleorton Masque. During the Civil War, William Seymour was a Royalist commander.

William and Frances together had seven children:

- William Seymour (1621 – 16 June 1646)
- Robert Seymour (1622–1646)
- Henry Seymour, Lord Beauchamp (1626 – 30 March 1654), married Mary Capel, by whom he had issue.
- Lady Mary Seymour (1636 – 10 April 1673, married Heneage Finch, 3rd Earl of Winchelsea, by whom she had issue.
- Lady Jane Seymour (6 July 1637 – 23 November 1679), married Charles Boyle, 3rd Viscount Dungarvan, by whom she had issue.
- Lady Frances Seymour (1642–?)
- John Seymour, 4th Duke of Somerset (born before 1646 – 29 April 1675), married Sarah Alston.

== Death ==
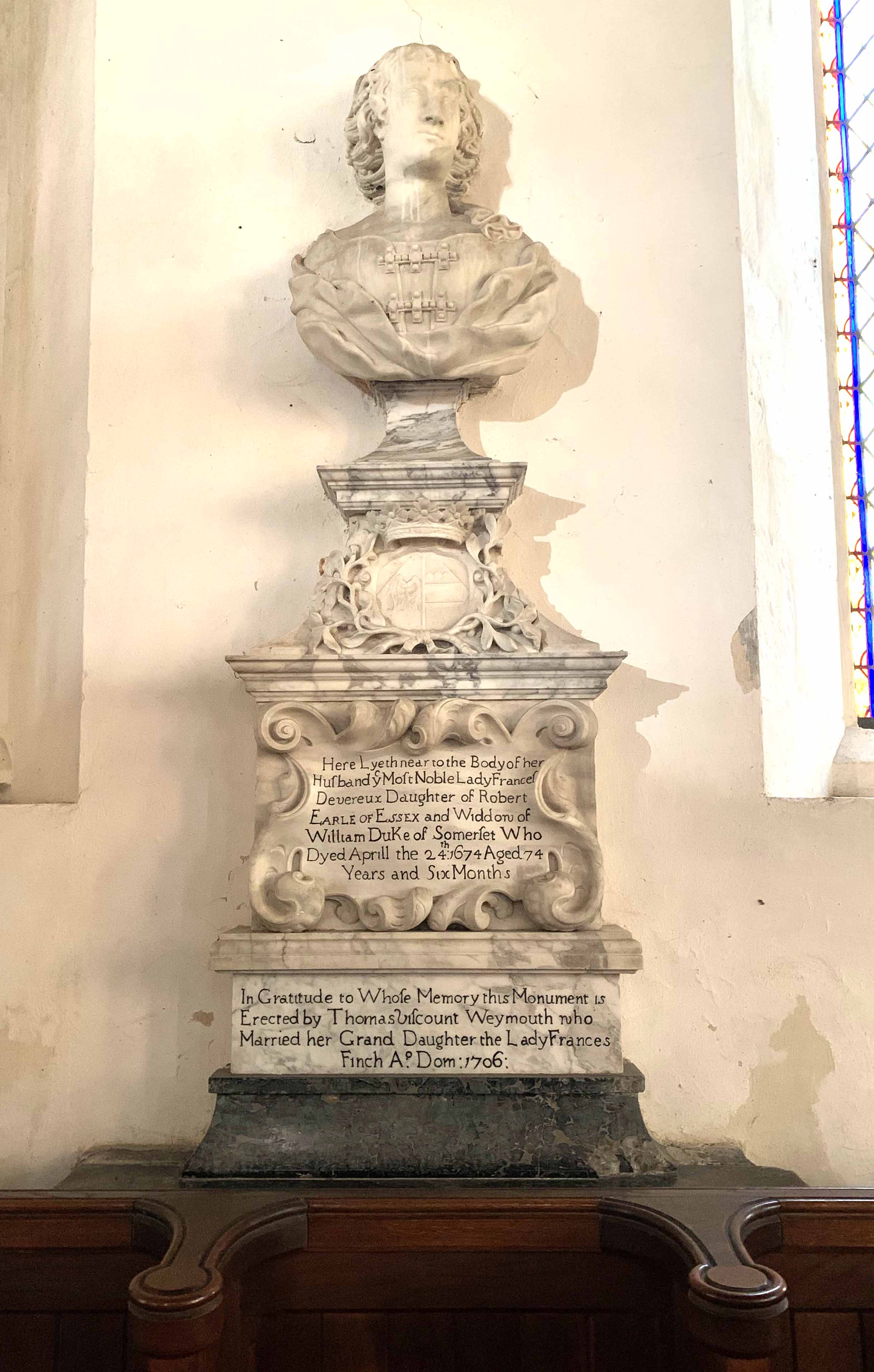
Memorial in Great Bedwyn church

She died on 24 April 1674 at the age of 74, and was buried in Great Bedwyn, Wiltshire. In 1706 a marble memorial topped with a bust was placed in St Mary's Church, Great Bedwyn, at the expense of Thomas Thynne, 1st Viscount Weymouth, who had married her granddaughter Frances Finch.

== Ancestry ==
Ancestors of Frances Seymour, Duchess of Somerset

Walter Devereux, 1st Viscount Hereford
Sir Richard Devereux
Mary Grey
Walter Devereux, 1st Earl of Essex
George Hastings, 1st Earl of Huntingdon
Dorothy Hastings
Lady Anne Stafford
Robert Devereux, 2nd Earl of Essex
Robert Knollys
Sir Francis Knollys
Lettice Penystone
Lettice Knollys
Sir William Carey
Lady Catherine Carey
Mary Boleyn
Frances Devereux
Sir James Walsingham
William Walsingham
Eleanor Writtle
Sir Francis Walsingham
Sir Edmund Denny
Joyce Denny
Mary Troutbeck
Frances Walsingham
Richard St. Barbe
Henry St. Barbe
Margery Grey
Ursula St. Barbe
Edward Lewknor
Eleanor Lewknor
Margaret Copley
