= Stoughton, Leicestershire =

Village and civil parish in Leicestershire, England

Coordinates: 52.61291°N 1.05623°W

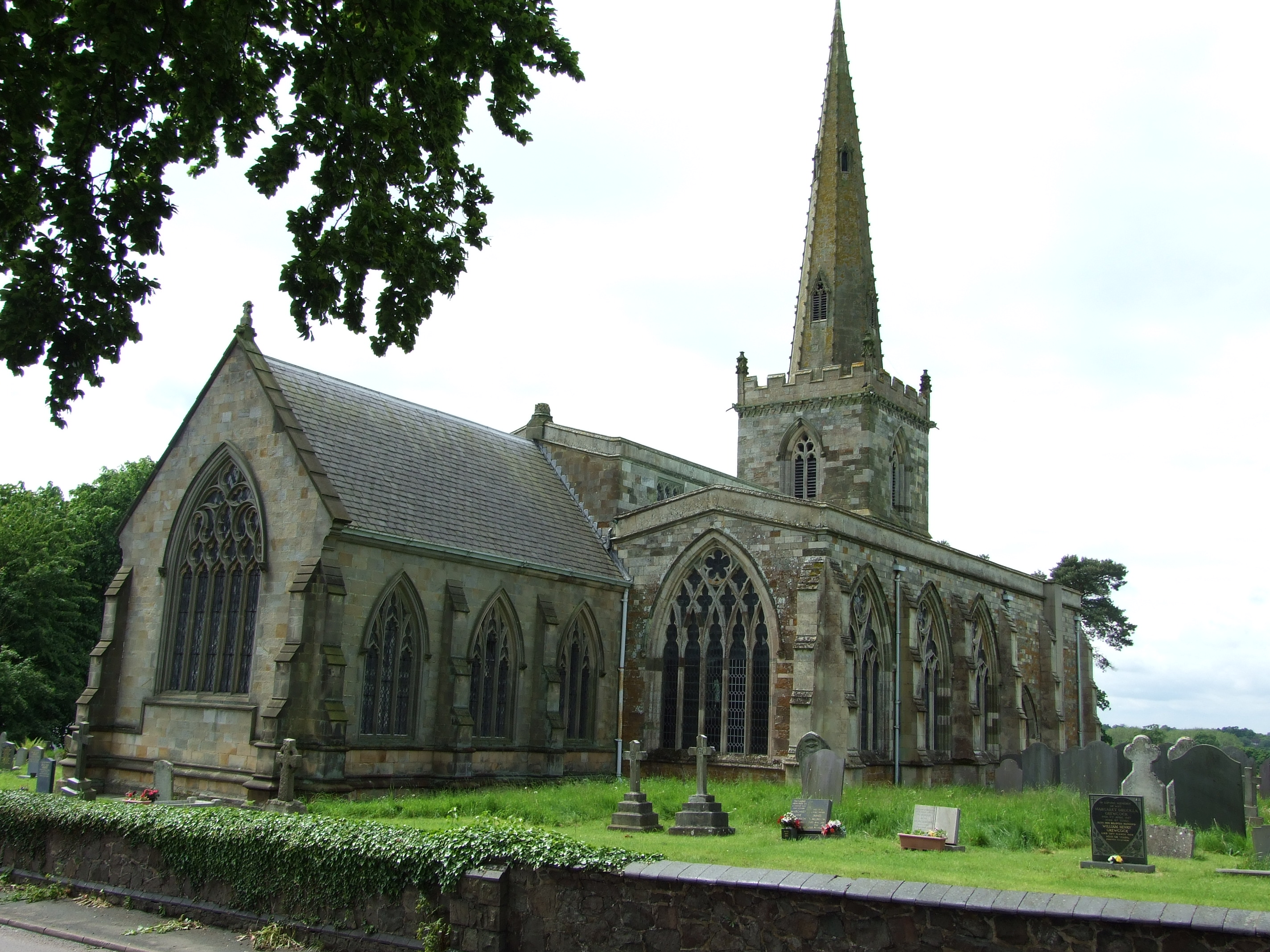
The church of St Mary and All Saints, Stoughton

Stoughton (/ˈstoʊtən/) is a village and civil parish in the Harborough district of Leicestershire. The population at the 2011 census was 351.

Stoughton is east of Leicester, in countryside between two protrusions of the Leicester urban area (Thurnby to the north and Oadby to the south). The closest part of the city of Leicester is Evington. Other nearby places are Houghton on the Hill and Great Stretton.

The parish church of St Mary and All Saints contains monuments to members of the Farnham and Beaumont families. Stoughton Grange was the principal grange or farm of Leicester Abbey. After the suppression of the abbey in 1538 it passed to the Farnhams.

Leicester Airport is close to the village; Stoughton Farm Park (formerly Stoughton Grange Farm), which was closed following the foot-and-mouth crisis and now houses a number of small businesses, is nearby. In 2008, the airport and adjacent land was the subject of a proposal to build an eco-town of some 15,000 to 20,000 new homes, with the provisional name of Pennbury.

== Notable people ==
- George Anthony Legh Keck, Member of Parliament
- Bella Wright, the victim in the Green Bicycle Case, is buried in the churchyard
