= Pennbury =

Coordinates: 52.604°N 1.039°W

Pennbury was the working name given to a proposed eco-town of 15,000 to 20,000 new homes intended to be built on Leicester Airport, four miles from the centre of Leicester. On 16 July 2009, Housing Minister John Healey announced that the Pennbury project would not go ahead.

The site is in the Harborough district council area and straddles the Harborough parliamentary constituency where the then-MP was Edward Garnier, and the Rutland and Melton parliamentary constituency where the then-MP was Alan Duncan.

The proposal was submitted by the Co-operative Group and English Partnerships and aroused local opposition on many grounds including destruction of the countryside and the traffic it would generate. On 29 January 2008 Edward Garnier spoke to the adjournment in parliament and was supported by other local MPs from both sides of the house in expression of their concerns about the secrecy evident in the process of shortlisting.

On 3 April, 2008, it was announced that the Pennbury proposal was one of fifteen sites shortlisted by Communities and Local Government (CLG) for the next phase of public consultations.

CLG's consultation paper on the shortlisted sites reported that the site would "create a largely freestanding community, but linked to Leicester" and accommodate 12,000 to 15,000 homes in a development of 750 hectares.
