= Eco-towns =

Government-sponsored programme of new towns

Eco-towns are a government-sponsored programme of new towns to be built in England, which are intended to achieve exemplary standards of sustainability.

In 2007, the Department for Communities and Local Government (CLG) announced a competition to build up to 10 eco-towns. The proposals received support from organisations such as the Town and Country Planning Association but have also attracted controversy and scepticism (see for example Manns 2008).

Initially over fifty eco-town bids were suggested, many of them modified versions of existing housing scheme proposals. The eco-town concept and initial locations were subject to consultation by Communities and Local Government ending on 30 June 2008.

A new Planning Policy Statement was prepared and published on 16 July 2009, describing the standards that eco-towns will have to meet, after a consultation period that ended on 30 April 2009.

By 2012, only four sites have been approved, with none completed.

In January 2017 a new initiative for fourteen Garden Villages and three Garden Towns was announced by Conservative Government. This included West Carclaze in Cornwall which was part of the initial eco-town proposal.

== Objectives ==
The eco-towns programme was intended to offer the opportunity to achieve high standards of sustainable living while also maximising the potential for affordable housing. Some 30% to 40% of housing in each eco-town is to be allocated as affordable, and made available to the thousands currently on the local housing waiting lists.

The largest will provide up to 20,000 new homes, with officials saying the towns should be "zero-carbon" developments and should be exemplary in one area of sustainability, such as energy production or waste disposal. The new environmentally-friendly towns – low-energy, carbon-neutral developments built from recycled materials – are intended to be largely car-free, with pedestrian and cycle-friendly environments.

The towns will need to adhere to strict development criteria which were developed by the Town and Country Planning Association (TCPA) through 'worksheets' as advice to promoters and planners. The following were published – transport, community development, waste management, green infrastructure and water cycle management, and could be accessed from the TCPA website.

== Eco-town standards ==
The standards eco-towns should meet include the following as set out in the 'draft Planning Policy Statement: eco-towns':

- Affordable housing: a minimum of 30% affordable housing in each eco-town
- Zero-carbon: eco-towns must be zero-carbon over the course of a year (not including transport emissions)
- Green space: a minimum of 40% of eco-towns must be greenspace
- Waste and recycling: eco-towns must have higher recycling rates and make use of waste in new ways
- Homes: homes must reach Code for Sustainable Homes level 4 or higher (surprisingly not the highest standard available, casting doubt on the credibility of these requirements)
- Employment: at least one job opportunity per house accessible by public transport, walking or cycling (although the standards are silent on how housing developers might guarantee this and it is largely discredited in the current economic crisis)
- Services: there must be shops and a primary school within easy walk of every single home, and all the services expected from a town of up to 20,000 homes
- Transition/construction: facilities should be in place before and during construction
- Public transport: real-time public transport information in every home, a public transport link within ten minutes walk of every home
- Community: there must be a mixture of housing types and densities, and residents must have a say in how their town is run, by governance in new and innovative ways.

There are further standards on water, biodiversity and other issues.

There is a short video about the standards.

The standards are subject to consultation and may therefore change. In Eco Towns, 32% of the total site will be used for housing and creating villages.

Every Eco Town that is built would have 14,000 proposed jobs such as manufacturing and industrial services.

== Sites ==
On 3 April 2008, the shortlist of fifteen sites for the next phase of public consultations was announced.

The shortlisted sites were:

- Bordon, Hampshire (Army base and existing town)
- Coltishall, Norfolk (RAF Coltishall airfield)
- Elsenham, Essex
- Ford, West Sussex (Grade 1 Agricultural Land)
- Hanley Grange, Cambridgeshire (near Hinxton and Duxford)
- Fradley, Staffordshire (RAF Lichfield)
- Imerys, near St Austell, Cornwall. (China Clay quarries)
- Leeds city region, West Yorkshire (site to be determined)
- Manby, Lincolnshire
- Marston Vale, Bedfordshire
- Middle Quinton, Warwickshire (army depot and business park)
- Pennbury, Leicestershire
- Rossington, South Yorkshire (colliery)
- Rushcliffe, Nottinghamshire (site to be confirmed)
- Weston Otmoor, Oxfordshire
- Rackheath, Norfolk. (on outskirts of Norwich)
- North West Bicester, Oxfordshire (proposed alternative to Weston Otmoor site).

Proposals for Curborough in Staffordshire, Hanley Grange in Cambridgeshire, Coltishall in Norfolk and Manby in Lincolnshire were subsequently withdrawn.

On 16 July 2009, the UK Government announced four successful eco-town bids:

- Whitehill-Bordon, Hampshire
- St Austell and Clay Country, Cornwall
- Rackheath, Norfolk
- North West Bicester, Oxfordshire

Housing Minister John Healey announced that developers in the four successful locations will be able to bid for a share of £60 million to support local infrastructure. He said he wanted to see at least six second wave areas identified in 2010 and announced up to £5 million available for councils to conduct further planning work on proposals.

As of 2012, no further sites have been approved:

== Evidence-base for Eco-towns as Sustainable New Settlements ==
As part of the Best Practice in Urban Extensions and New Settlements study in 2007, the TCPA had been looking at several urban extensions and new settlements around the country to identify what has changed since the new towns in terms of planning for large scale growth. This work is to inform local authorities who are contemplating growth and to showcase good practice, with reference to community engagement, design, environmental sustainability and masterplanning.

It carried forward a piece of research undertaken with Arup looking at the sustainability criteria for new settlement and urban extension options in the Cambridge and Stansted sub regions as part of the East of England draft regional spatial strategy 'Examination in Public' process.

Some key terms of reference from this project are taken from the Barker Review. These include the following:

- Is the site able to support a viable community in terms of facilities and amenities?
- Can it showcase excellent design and sustainable buildings within a good quality environment?
- Is the site linked and supplied with good quality infrastructure – if not what are the transferable lessons to new growth poles?
- What are the linkages to nearby viable settlements and are they appropriate and useful?

== Controversy ==
The plans have proved controversial with campaigners saying the idea is a way to evade normal planning controls and bring forward schemes which have previously been turned down by local authorities as unsuitable. For example, the Ford Eco Town site has previously been rejected by Arun District Council twice. Professor David Lock, architect of the Marston Vale "vision plan" and former Chairman of the Town and Country Planning Association and an expert adviser to the Government has made public that the Government plans "to force through eco-towns" by "crashing the planning process". However, last but one Government housing minister Caroline Flint and previous incumbent Margaret Beckett have repeatedly assured critics that each eco-town proposal will go through the normal planning process. Critics point out however that once the Government has issued a Planning Policy Statement (PPS) designating a site as suitable for Eco Town status, that will then have to be taken into account by local planners and will reduce their ability to reject a scheme for being proposed on green field sites.

Many local residents' groups have argued against the sustainability of locating an eco-town in their proximity, citing poor transport links and building on primarily greenfield and agricultural land. Supporters of proposed eco-towns counter-argue that their districts need more affordable housing and that eco-towns will provide these homes in a comprehensively planned and sustainable way. Population Matters, (formerly known as the Optimum Population Trust), has pointed to a discrepancy between the limited number and size of eco-town schemes and the much larger figure for projected housing need. Supporters counter however that eco-towns will be exemplar settlements, informing future sustainable housing developments for many years.

Poor public transport at the short-listed locations raised concerns that "high levels of car ownership will undermine the rest of the strategy".

== Change of government ==
The general election of May 2010 resulted in a change of government, with a Conservative / Liberal Democrat coalition replacing the Labour Party, against a backdrop of a prolonged economic downturn. As of August 2010 the eco-town plan is still under review, although in July 2010 it was announced by housing minister Grant Shapps that funding for the financial year 2010/11 was to be cut by 50%.

In April 2011, the coalition government announced that only one of the proposed eco-towns, Northwest Bicester in Oxfordshire, will now actually be built to the originally proposed standards. The other proposed eco-towns, will only need to be built to meet current building requirement, applied to any new build dwelling.
