= Beaumont baronets =

Extinct baronetcy in the Baronetage of England

Arms of Beaumont: Azure semé of fleurs-de-lis, a lion rampant or

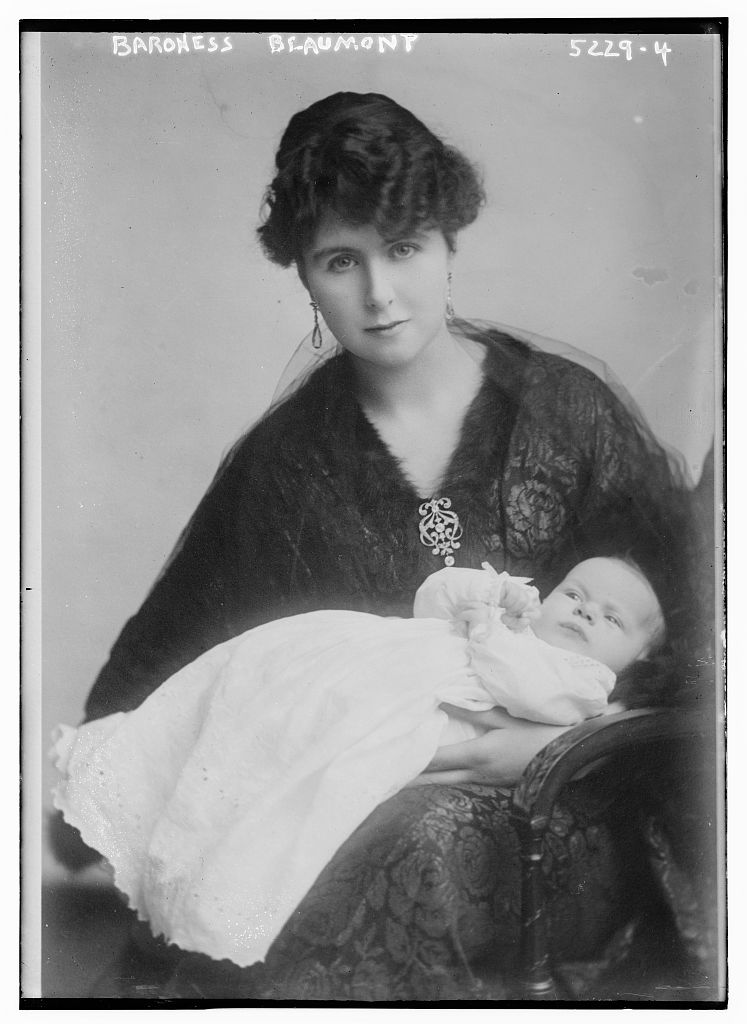
Baroness Beaumont circa 1920

There have been four baronetcies created for members of the ancient House of Beaumont, all in the Baronetage of England. All four creations are extinct or dormant.

The Beaumont Baronetcy, of Coleorton in the County of Leicester, was created in the Baronetage of England on 17 September 1619 for Thomas Beaumont. In 1622 he was raised to the peerage as Viscount Beaumont of Swords. For more information on this creation, see this title.

The Beaumont Baronetcy, of Grace Dieu in the County of Leicester, was created in the Baronetage of England on 31 January 1627 for the poet John Beaumont of Grace Dieu Manor. He was the son of Francis Beaumont, Member of Parliament for Aldborough, a descendant of Thomas Beaumont, son of Sir Thomas Beaumont (died 1457), younger son of John Beaumont, 4th Baron Beaumont (see the Baron Beaumont). Thomas's brother John Beaumont was the ancestor of the first Baronets of the 1619 and 1661 creations (see below). The first Baronet was succeeded by his eldest son, the second Baronet. He fought in the Civil War as a colonel in the Royalist Army and was killed in action during the Siege of Gloucester in 1643. On his death the title passed to his younger brother, the third Baronet. He had no sons and on his death in 1686 the baronetcy became extinct.

The dramatist Francis Beaumont was the brother of the first Baronet.

The Beaumont Baronetcy, of Whitley in the County of York, was created in the Baronetage of England on 15 August 1628 for Richard Beaumont, Member of Parliament for Pontefract. He never married and the title became extinct on his death in 1631.

The Beaumont Baronetcy, of Stoughton Grange in the County of Leicester, was created in the Baronetage of England on 21 February 1661 for Thomas Beaumont, Member of Parliament for Leicestershire. He had already been created a baronet by Oliver Cromwell in 1658. However, this creation was considered invalid at the Restoration. Beaumont was the grandson of Sir Thomas Beaumont, whose brother Sir Henry Beaumont was the father of Thomas Beaumont, 1st Viscount Beaumont of Swords. Sir Thomas and Sir Henry were both descended from John Beaumont, son of Sir Thomas Beaumont (died 1457), younger son of John Beaumont, 4th Baron Beaumont. John's brother Thomas Beaumont was the ancestor of the first Baronet of the 1627 creation. The first Baronet was succeeded by his son, the second Baronet. He also represented Leicestershire in Parliament. On his death the title passed to his eldest son, the third Baronet. He died unmarried and was succeeded by his younger brother, the fourth Baronet. He was Member of Parliament for Leicester and served as a Lord of the Admiralty. In 1702 he inherited the Coleorton estate in Leicestershire from his kinsman, the third and last Viscount Beaumont of Swords.

He also died unmarried and was succeeded by his younger brother, the fifth Baronet. He died childless and was succeeded by his first cousin once removed, the sixth Baronet. He was the grandson of William Beaumont, younger son of the first Baronet. Beaumont was High Sheriff of Leicestershire from 1761 to 1762. His son, the seventh Baronet, represented Beeralston in the House of Commons but is best remembered as an art patron and amateur painter. He died childless and was succeeded by his first cousin once removed, the eighth Baronet. He was the grandson of Thomas Beaumont, younger brother of the sixth Baronet. His son, the ninth Baronet, was High Sheriff of Leicestershire in 1852. The title became dormant upon the death of the 12th Baronet in 2011.

Basil Beaumont (died 1703), younger son of the second Baronet, was a rear-admiral in the Royal Navy. Elizabeth Richardson, 1st Lady Cramond, was the aunt and Huntingdon Beaumont the great-uncle of the first Baronet.

== Beaumont baronets, of Cole Orton (1619) ==
- see the Viscount Beaumont of Swords

== Beaumont baronets, of Grace Dieu (1627) ==
- Sir John Beaumont, 1st Baronet (c. 1582–1627)
- Sir John Beaumont, 2nd Baronet (1607–1643)
- Sir Thomas Beaumont, 3rd Baronet (1620–1686)

== Beaumont baronets, of Whitley (1628) ==
- Sir Richard Beaumont, 1st Baronet (died 1631)

== Beaumont baronets, of Stoughton Grange (1661) ==
Beaumont Baronets, of Stoughton Grange
- Motto: Erectus non elatus (Exalted not elated)
- Arms: Azure semy of Fleurs-de-lis a lion rampant Or
- Crest: On a chapeau Azure semy of fleurs de lis doubled Ermine a Lion passant with tail extended Or

- Sir Thomas Beaumont, 1st Baronet (died 1676)
- Sir Henry Beaumont, 2nd Baronet (1638–1689)
- Sir Thomas Beaumont, 3rd Baronet (c. 1664–1690)
- Sir George Beaumont, 4th Baronet (c. 1664–1737)
- Sir Lewis Beaumont, 5th Baronet (c. 1673–1738)
- Sir George Beaumont, 6th Baronet (1726–1762)
- Sir George Howland Beaumont, 7th Baronet (1753–1827)
- Sir George Howland Willoughby Beaumont, 8th Baronet (1799–1845) married the daughter of william howley
- Sir George Howland Beaumont, 9th Baronet (1828–1882)
- Sir George Howland William Beaumont, 10th Baronet (1851–1914)
- Sir George Arthur Hamilton Beaumont, 11th Baronet (1881–1933)
- Sir George Howland Francis Beaumont, 12th Baronet (1924–2011)

== See also ==
- House of Beaumont
- Baron Beaumont
- Viscount Beaumont
- Lord Cramond
