= Thomas Farnham (MP) =

16th-century English politician

Thomas Farnham (by 1527–1562) was an English politician.

He was a member (MP) of the parliament of England for Leicester in October 1553, East Grinstead in 1558, and Gatton in 1559.

his daughter katherine married thomas beaumont
