= Beaumont (surname) =

Beaumont, originally de Beaumont, is an English surname of Norman origin or a French surname (from French beau mont, "beautiful mountain"). Notable people with the surname include:

== A ==
- Adam Beaumont (born 1972), English businessman and investor
- Adrian Beaumont (born 1937), British composer and conductor
- Agnes Beaumont (bapt. 1652 – 1720), English religious autobiographer
- Alan Beaumont (1934– 2004), Royal Australian Navy officer
- Alan Beaumont (footballer) (1927–1999), English footballer.
- Albanis Beaumont (1755–1812), English painter
- Alexandre Beaumont (1827–1909), French librettist, playwright and novelist.
- Andrew Beaumont (1790–1853), American politician from Pennsylvania
- Anna de Beaumont (c. 1430 – 1518), Spanish-Navarrese noblewoman and courtier
- Anthony Beaumont-Dark (1932–2006), British politician
- Antony Beaumont (born 1949), English and German musicologist, writer, conductor and violinist
- Armes Beaumont (1842–1913), Australian vocalist
- Art Beaumont (1904–1980), Australian rules footballer
- Augustus Hardin Beaumont (1798–1838), American abolitionist, journalist and radical politician in Jamaica and England

== B ==
- Basil Beaumont (1669 – 29 November 1703), Royal Navy officer, son of Henry Beaumont, 2nd Baronet
- Betty Beaumont (born 1946), Canadian-American artist, sculptor and photographer
- Betty Bentley Beaumont (1828–1892), British author and merchant
- Bill Beaumont (born 1952), English rugby union footballer and administrator
- Billy Beaumont (1883–1911), English footballer
- Binkie Beaumont (1908–1973), British theatre manager and producer
- Bob Beaumont (1932–2011), American industrialist
- Brad Beaumont (born 1992), Canadian former soccer player
- Bryan Beaumont (1938–2005), Australian judge
- B. Beaumont (Betty Beaumont, 1828–1892), British merchant and autobiographer in the United States

== C ==
- Callum Beaumont (born 1988), Scottish bagpipe player
- Campbell E. Beaumont (1883–1954), American judge from California
- Carol Beaumont (born 1960), New Zealand unionist and politician
- Charles Beaumont (1929–1967), American writer of speculative fiction
- Charles de Beaumont (1902–1972), British fencer
- Charlotte Beaumont (born 1995), English actress
- Chevalier d'Eon (Charles-Geneviève-Louis-Auguste-André-Timothée d'Éon de Beaumont), French diplomat and spy who lived his life as a woman
- Chris Beaumont (born 1965), English footballer
- Christophe de Beaumont (1703–1781), French cleric
- Christopher Beaumont (born 1961), Australian painter
- Christopher Beaumont, 23rd Seigneur of Sark (born 1957), British Army officer
- Claudio Francesco Beaumont (1694–1766), Italian painter
- Comyns Beaumont (1873–1955), British author and journalist
- Cyril W. Beaumont (1891–1976), British dance historian and bookseller

== D ==
- Daisy Beaumont (born 1973), English actress
- Damien Beaumont, a gabroadcaster and musician
- Dave Beaumont (born 1963), Scottish footballer
- David Beaumont (born 1942), British diplomat
- Diana Beaumont (1909–1964), British actress
- Dudley Beaumont (1877–1918), British Army officer and painter

== E ==
- Édouard de Beaumont (died 1888), French painter
- Edward Beaumont-Nesbitt (1859–1944), Anglo-Irish landowner and official
- Elizabeth Beaumont (writer) (c. 1576–1651), English writer and peeress
- Ellen Beaumont (born 1985), Australian association football player
- Ephraim Beaumont (1834–1918), American politician from Wisconsin
- Ermengarde de Beaumont (c.1170–1234), Queen Consort of Scotland
- Ernest Beaumont (1876–1967), Canadian landowner
- Eugene B. Beaumont (1837–1916), Union Army officer of the American Civil War
- E. B. Beaumont (Eugene Beauharnais Beaumont Jr., 1868– 1934), American college football coach, son of Eugene B. Beaumont

== F ==
- Francis Beaumont (1584–1616), English dramatist
- Francis Beaumont (MP) (died 1598), English Member of Parliament for Aldeburgh
- Francis William Beaumont (1903–1941), British film producer
- François de Beaumont (c. 1512–1587), Provençal military leader
- Frederick Beaumont (1833–1899), British Army officer, engineer and inventor
- Frederick Beaumont-Nesbitt (1893–1971), British Army officer

== G ==
- Gabrielle Beaumont (1942–2022), British-American film and television director
- Geoffrey Beaumont (1903–1970), Anglican priest and monk, songwriter and hymnist
- George Beaumont (minister) (fl. 1800–1830), British nonconformist and controversialist
- George Beaumont (rower) (1904–1991), British rower
- Sir George Beaumont, 4th Baronet (c.1664–1737), English Member of Parliament for Leicester
- Sir George Beaumont, 7th Baronet (1753–1827), British Member of Parliament, amateur painter, art patron and collector
- Gerald Beaumont (1940–2024), Australian Anglican bishop
- Germaine Beaumont (1890–1983), French journalist and writer
- Gilles de Beaumont, 13th-century trouvère
- Ginger Beaumont (1876–1956), American baseball player
- Gustave de Beaumont (1802–1866), French writer, magistrate and prison reformer

== H ==
- Hanneke Beaumont (born 1947), Dutch sculptor
- Harold Beaumont (1916–2003), English cricketer
- Harry Beaumont (1888–1966), American film director
- Harry Beaumont (rugby league), English rugby league footballer of the early 20th century
- Henry Beaumont, known as Henry Harcourt (1612–1673), English Jesuit
- Henry Beaumont (died 1607) (c. 1545–1607), English Member of Parliament for Leicestershire
- Henry Beaumont (cricketer) (1881–1964), English British Army officer and cricketer
- Henry Beaumont (priest) (died 1627), English Anglican priest, Canon of Windsor
- Henry Frederick Beaumont (1833–1913), British Member of Parliament for Yorkshire South and for Colne Valley
- Sir Henry Beaumont, 2nd Baronet (1638–1689), English Member of Parliament for Leicester
- Henry de Beaumont (died 1340), 4th Earl of Buchan (jure uxoris) and 1st Baron Beaumont
- Henry de Beaumont, 1st Earl of Warwick (died 1123)
- Henry de Beaumont, 5th Earl of Warwick (c.1192–1229)
- Hubert Beaumont (Liberal politician) (1864–1922), British politician and radical
- Hubert Beaumont (Labour politician) (1883–1948), English Member of Parliament
- Hugh Beaumont (1909–1982), American actor
- Hugh de Beaumont, 1st Earl of Bedford (born 1106), English earl under King Stephen
- Hughes de Beaumont (1874–1947), French artist
- Huntingdon Beaumont (c.1560–1624), English coal mining entrepreneur

== I ==
- Isabella de Beaumont (died 1334), English noblewoman and courtier

== J ==
- Jack Beaumont (cricketer) (1855–1920), English cricketer
- Jack Beaumont (footballer) (born 1994), Scottish footballer
- Jack Beaumont (rower) (born 1993), British rower
- Jacques de Beaumont (1901–1985), Swiss biologist
- James Beaumont (born 1984), English footballer
- Jean de Beaumont (1904–2002), French businessman and sport shooter
- Jean-Louis Beaumont (1925–2013), French politician
- Jeanne Marie Beaumont, American poet
- Jeanne-Marie Leprince de Beaumont (1711–1780), French novelist known for the most popular version of the story Beauty and the Beast
- Jimmy Beaumont (1940–2017), American singer of the doo-wop group The Skyliners
- Joan Beaumont (born 1948), Australian historian
- Johanna Jacoba van Beaumont (c.1752–1827), Dutch journalist and feminist
- John of Beaumont (1288–1356), Dutch nobleman
- John Beaumont (by 1508 – between 1558 and 1564), English Member of Parliament
- John Beaumont (died 1701) (c.1636–1701), English politician, Member of Parliament for Nottingham and Hastings
- John Beaumont (cricketer) (1855–1920), English fast bowler
- John Beaumont (geologist) (c.1650–1731), English geologist
- John Beaumont (judge) (fl. 1550), English judge, Master of the Rolls
- John Beaumont (sport shooter) (1924–2000), American Olympic shooter
- John Michael Beaumont (1927–2016), Seigneur of Sark from 1974
- John Ralph Beaumont (1927–1992), Rhodesian politician
- John Thomas Barber Beaumont (1774–1841), British army officer, painter, author and philanthropist
- John William Fisher Beaumont (1877–1974), chief justice of the Bombay High Court
- John Beaumont, 4th Baron Beaumont (1361–1396), English military and naval commander
- John Beaumont, 1st Viscount Beaumont (c.1409–1460)
- Sir John Beaumont, 1st Baronet (c.1583–1627), English poet
- Joseph Beaumont (1616–1699), English clergyman, academic and poet
- Joseph Beaumont (minister) (1794–1855), English physician and Wesleyan Methodist minister
- Josh Beaumont (born 1992), English rugby union footballer

== K ==
- Kathryn Beaumont (born 1938), British actress and educator
- Kenneth Macdonald Beaumont (1884–1965), British lawyer, officer and figure skater
- Kerry Beaumont (born 1957), British organist and choir director

== L ==
- Len Beaumont (1915–2002), English footballer
- Leonard Beaumont (1891–1986), English printmaker and illustrator
- Lewis Beaumont (1847–1922), Royal Navy officer
- Lewis de Beaumont (died 1333), Bishop of Durham
- Linette Beaumont, British actress
- Lionel Beaumont-Thomas (1893–1942), Welsh businessman, army officer and politician
- Louis-Marie-Joseph Beaumont (1753–1828), Canadian farmer and political figure
- Louis de Beaumont, 2nd Count de Lerín (c.1430–1508), noble of the Kingdom of Navarre
- Louise Beaumont (born 1959), Canadian handball player
- Lucien Beaumont (born 1931), Canadian swimmer
- Lucy Beaumont (actress) (1873–1937), English actress
- Lucy Beaumont (comedian) (born 1984), British actress, writer and stand-up comedian
- Lyne Beaumont (born 1978), Canadian synchronized swimmer

== M ==
- Madeleine Beaumont (1883–1975), British figure skater
- Máirín Beaumont (1894–1972), Irish nationalist
- Marc Antoine de Beaumont (1763–1830), French cavalry general
- Marcantonio De Beaumont-Bonelli (born 1890), Italian competitive sailor
- Margaret de Beaumont, 7th Countess of Warwick (died 1253), English noblewoman
- Marguerite de Beaumont (1899–1989), British Girl Guide leader, horse breeder, author and poet
- María José Beaumont (born 1956), Spanish politician from Navarre
- María Josefa Huarte Beaumont (1927–2015), Spanish art collector and philanthropist
- Mark Beaumont (cyclist) (born 1983), Scottish cyclist
- Mark Beaumont (journalist) (born 1972), English music journalist
- Martin Beaumont (born 1949), British businessman
- Mary Beaumont (author) (1849–1910), pen name of Rosalina Mellor Oakes, English author
- Mary Elizabeth Beaumont, better known as Mary Lawson (1910–1941), British actress who married Francis William Beaumont
- Matt Beaumont, British copywriter and novelist
- Maxime Beaumont (born 1982), French sprint canoeist
- Michael Beaumont (British politician) (1903–1958), British soldier and politician
- Michael Beaumont (South African politician) (born 1985), South African politician and strategist
- Michael Beaumont, 22nd Seigneur of Sark (1927–2016), civil engineer
- Mona Beaumont (1927–2007), French–American painter and printmaker
- Muriel Beaumont (1876–1957), English stage actress

== N ==
- Natasha Beaumont (born 1974), British-Australian actress and model
- Neal Beaumont (born 1941), Canadian football player
- Nicholas Beaumont (before 1526 – 1585), English politician
- Nigel Beaumont (born 1967), English footballer

== O ==
- Orpheus Beaumont (1863–1951), British-New Zealand woman who invented the Salvus life jacket

== P ==
- Pierre de Beaumont (1915–2010), American mechanical engineer
- Percy Beaumont (1897–1967), English footballer
- Peter Beaumont (archaeologist) (1935–2016), South African archaeologist
- Peter Beaumont (figure skater) (born 2001), English ice dancer
- Peter Beaumont (journalist) (born 1961), British journalist
- Peter Beaumont (judge) (born 1944), British judge
- Peter Beaumont (racehorse trainer) (1934–2020), British racehorse trainer
- Peter Beaumont (rower) (born 1965), British Olympic rower
- Philip Beaumont (1432–1473), English landowner and politician

== R ==
- Ralph Beaumont (1901–1977), British soldier and politician
- Ralph Beaumont (unionist) (born 1844), American labor union leader
- Rébecca Beaumont (born 1990), Canadian racing cyclist
- René Beaumont (born 1940), French politician
- Richard Beaumont (actor) (1961–2022), British actor
- Richard Beaumont (rugby league) (born 1988), English rugby league footballer
- Richard Ashton Beaumont (1912–2009), British diplomat and Arabist
- Sir Richard Beaumont, 1st Baronet (1574–1631), English politician
- Richard Beaumont-Thomas (1860–1917), British steel company manager
- Robert Beaumont (essayist) (fl. 1639), English essayist
- Robert Beaumont (Master of Trinity College) (c. 1525 – 1567), English cleric and academic
- Robert de Beaumont, 1st Earl of Leicester (c.1049–1118), Anglo-Norman nobleman
- Robert de Beaumont, 2nd Earl of Leicester (c.1102–1168), Anglo-Norman nobleman and Justiciar of England
- Robert de Beaumont, 3rd Earl of Leicester (1121–1190), English nobleman
- Robert de Beaumont, 4th Earl of Leicester (died 1204), English nobleman
- Roger de Beaumont (c.1015–1094), a seigneur of Normandy
- Roger de Beaumont (bishop) (died 1202), Bishop of St Andrews
- Rolland Beaumont (1884–1958), South African cricketer
- Ron Beaumont (1928−2012), Australian rugby league footballer

== S ==
- Scott Beaumont (born 1978), English mountain bike racer
- Sibyl Mary Hathaway (1884–1974), 21st Seigneur of Sark, married to Dudley John Beaumont
- Simon Beaumont (born 1975), Australian rules footballer
- Somerset Beaumont (1835–1921), British politician
- Stephanie Beaumont (born 1974), Canadian country music artist
- Steve Beaumont (1951–2023), Australian rules footballer
- Susan Beaumont (1936–2020), English film actress
- Sydney Beaumont (1884–1939), English football player and manager, runner and cricketer

== T ==
- Tammy Beaumont (born 1991), English cricketer
- Thomas Beaumont (died c. 1582), English Member of Parliament for Norwich in 1572
- Thomas Beaumont (died 1614) (c.1555–1614), English Member of Parliament for Leicester
- Thomas Richard Beaumont (1758–1829), British soldier and politician
- Thomas Wentworth Beaumont (1792–1848), British soldier and politician
- Sir Thomas Beaumont, 1st Baronet (died 1676), English politician
- Thomas Beaumont, 1st Viscount Beaumont of Swords (c.1582–1625), English politician
- Thomas de Beaumont, 6th Earl of Warwick (1208–1242), English nobleman
- Tim Beaumont (1928–2008), British politician, Anglican cleric and life peer

== V ==
- Victor Beaumont (1912–1977), British actor

== W ==
- Waleran de Beaumont, 1st Earl of Worcester (1104–1166), Anglo-Norman nobleman
- Waleran de Beaumont, 4th Earl of Warwick (died 1204), English nobleman
- Walter Beaumont (1914–1940), British flying ace
- Wentworth Beaumont, 1st Baron Allendale (1829–1907), British industrialist and politician
- Wentworth Beaumont, 1st Viscount Allendale (1860–1923), British politician
- Wentworth Beaumont, 2nd Viscount Allendale (1890–1956), British peer
- Wentworth Beaumont, 3rd Viscount Allendale (1922–2002), British peer, Royal Air Force officer and race horse breeder
- Wentworth Beaumont, 4th Viscount Allendale (born 1948), British peer
- William Beaumont (1427–1453), English landowner in Devon
- William Beaumont, 2nd Viscount Beaumont (1438–1507), soldier and landowner
- William Beaumont (1785–1853), U.S. Army surgeon, the "Father of Gastric Physiology"
- William Comyns Beaumont (1873–1956), British journalist, author and lecturer
- William Rawlins Beaumont (1803–1875), British-Canadian surgeon
- William Spencer Beaumont (1848–1926), British army officer and local politician
- William Worby Beaumont (c.1848–1929), British automotive engineer and inventor
- William de Beaumont, 3rd Earl of Warwick (before 1140 – 1184), English nobleman

== Fictional characters ==
- Andrea Beaumont, aka the Phantasm, a DC Comics Batman villain
- David “Judge” Beaumont, the main protagonist and player controlled character in the video game Ready or Not. He is the leader of the LSPD SWAT unit.
- James Beaumont was a character on the television series Dallas in the 13th Season. He was the son of J.R. Ewing from his affair with Vanessa Beaumont in Vienna; he was born in 1967. James was raised in Europe with his mother and her husband who he believed to be his father until his mother told him that his true father was Texas oil baron J.R. Ewing.
- Jeffrey Beaumont, protagonist of the film Blue Velvet.
- Remy Beaumont, a main character in the television series Ravenswood.
  - Simon and Terry Beaumont, Remy's parents.
- Ned Beaumont, main protagonist of the novel The Glass Key

== See also ==
- The Beaumont children disappearance in Australia
- Clark Beaumont, Australian art duo
- House of Beaumont, an Anglo-Norman baronial family
- Beaumont (disambiguation)
- Élie de Beaumont
- Beamont
