= William Beamont (disambiguation) =

William Beamont (1797–1889) was an English mayor, solicitor and philanthropist.

William Beamont may also refer to:

- William John Beamont (1828–1868), English clergyman and author

== See also ==
- William Beaumont (disambiguation)
- Beamont (surname)
