= Elizabeth Beaumont =

Elizabeth Beaumont may refer to:

- Elizabeth Beaumont (writer) (c. 1576–1651), English writer and peeress
- Betty Beaumont (born 1946), Canadian-American artist
- B. Beaumont (Betty Beaumont, 1828–1892), British author, merchant, cotton factor and hotel owner.
