= Robert Blakey =

Robert Blakey may refer to:

- G. Robert Blakey (1936–2026), American attorney and law professor
- Robert Blakey (writer) (1795–1878), English writer and academic, a Chartist radical and journalist
