= Henry Beaumont =

Henry Beaumont may refer to:

- Henry Beaumont (magistrate), English MP for Derby
- Sir Henry Beaumont (of Gracedieu) (1581–1605), English MP for Leicester, 1604
- Sir Henry Beaumont (died 1607) (c. 1545–1607), English MP for Leicestershire, 1589, 1606
- Sir Henry Beaumont, 2nd Baronet (1638–1689), English MP for Leicester
- Henry Frederick Beaumont (1833–1913), British MP for Yorkshire South and for Colne Valley
- Henry Beaumont (priest) (died 1627), Canon of Windsor
- Henry Beaumont (cricketer) (1881–1964), English cricketer and British Army officer
- Henry Beamont, known as Henry Harcourt (1612–1673), English Jesuit

== See also ==
- Henry de Beaumont (disambiguation)
- Harry Beaumont (1888–1966), American film director
- Harry Beaumont (rugby league), English rugby league footballer of the 1900s
- Beaumont (disambiguation)
