= Robert Beaumont =

Robert Beaumont may refer to:

- Robert de Beaumont, 1st Earl of Leicester (c. 1040/1050–1118), Norman nobleman
- Robert de Beaumont, 2nd Earl of Leicester (1104–1168), Justiciar of England, 1155–1168
- Robert de Beaumont, 3rd Earl of Leicester (died 1190), English nobleman
- Robert de Beaumont, 4th Earl of Leicester (died 1204), English nobleman
- Robert de Beaumont, Count of Meulan (c. 1142–1207), French nobleman
- Robert Beaumont (Master of Trinity College) (died 1567), English educator
- Bob Beaumont (1932–2011), American automobile manufacturer
- Sir Robert Beaumont, character in the 1996 American film The Ghost and the Darkness
- Robert Beaumont (essayist) (fl. 1639), English essayist
