= Élie de Beaumont =

Élie de Beaumont is a family name, and may refer to:

- Anne-Louise Élie de Beaumont (1729–1783), French writer
- Jean-Baptiste Élie de Beaumont (1798–1874), French geologist
- Jean-Baptiste-Jacques Élie de Beaumont (1732–1786), French lawyer

== See also ==
- Mount Elie de Beaumont, New Zealand
