= Mary Beaumont =

Mary Beaumont may refer to:

- Mary Lawson (actress) (1910–1941), English stage and film actress, married name Beaumont
- Mary Beaumont (author) (1849–1910), Victorian author
- Mary Beaumont (died 1632), created Mary Villiers, Countess of Buckingham in her own right
- Mary Beaumont Welch (1841–1923), American educator and suffragist
