= Hughes de Beaumont =

French painter and engraver

Freiburg im Breisgau in Snow by Hughes de Beaumont

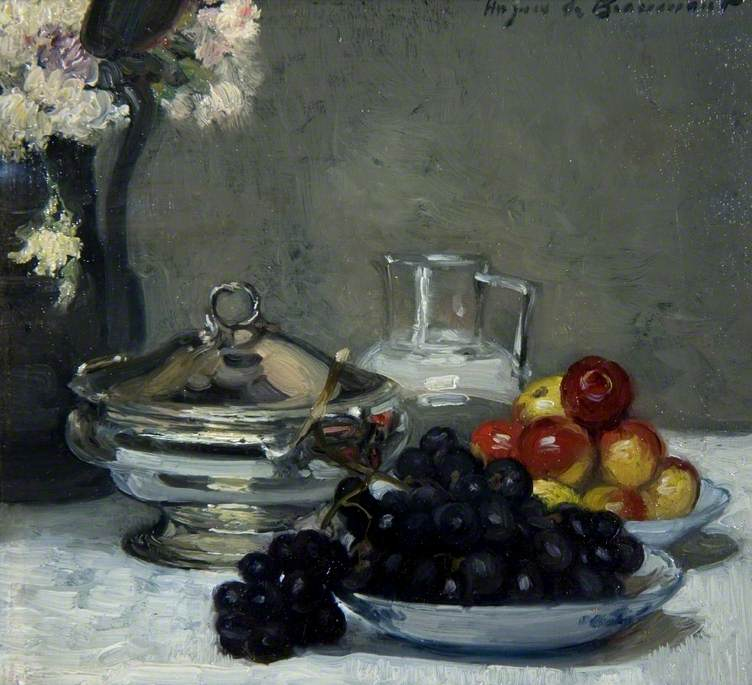
Still life with fruit by Hughes de Beaumont

Hughes de Beaumont (26 October 1874 – 6 June 1947) was a French painter and engraver of genre, portraits, landscapes and still lifes.

Beaumont studied under Albert Mangan and Theobald Chartran, and then under Gustave Moreau between 1892 and 1898. He exhibited at the Salon of French artists in Paris 1892 and 1945 and at the Salon of the Societe Nationale des Beaux-Arts in Paris 1902. He exhibited in Barcelona in 1912, Chicago in 1919, Wiesbaden in 1920, Amsterdam in 1926, and Brussels and Tokyo in 1928. He was awarded the Légion d'honneur in 1930, and two retrospectives of his works were presented in Paris, in 1927 and 1945.

Beaumont produced work in the "intimiste" style, which often depicted bourgeois settings. The term was coined by Édouard Vuillard who used it to describe his own style. Other practitioners include Maurice Lobre, René Georges Hermann-Paul, Henri Matisse, Rene Prinet and Ernest Laurent. The Intimists first collective exhibition was shown at Henry Grave's galleries in 1905. The exhibition included several works by Hughes de Beaumont.

He was known for his figure scenes and portraits of wealthy people, but he also painted landscapes and still lifes. Beaumont used a sombre palette for his still lifes, usually consisting of a green and blue colour scheme, with the paint applied in an expressionistic way, on the small lightweight wooden panel. His impasto and broad brushstrokes give the paintings a forceful and intense impact on the viewer.

Beaumont's works have been exhibited and collected by major museums and galleries throughout the world, including:

- Aix-en-Provence - Musée Granet
- Boston - Museum of Fine Arts, Boston
- Cork - Crawford Art Gallery
- Glasgow - Kelvingrove Art Gallery and Museum
- Lyon - Museum of Fine Arts of Lyon
- Montpellier - Musée Fabre
- Paris - Musée du Luxembourg
- Tours - Musée des Beaux-Arts de Tours
