= William Beaumont (disambiguation) =

William Beaumont (1785–1853) was a U.S. Army surgeon.

William Beaumont may also refer to:

- Bill Beaumont (born 1952), English rugby player
- William Beaumont, 2nd Viscount Beaumont (1438–1507), English soldier and landowner
- William Spencer Beaumont (1848–1926), British army officer and a member of the London County Council
- William Comyns Beaumont (1873–1956), British journalist, author, and lecturer
- William Beaumont (1427–1453), lord of the manor of Shirwell in North Devon
- William Rawlins Beaumont (1803–1875), Canadian surgeon
- Billy Beaumont (1883–1911), English footballer

== See also ==
- William de Beaumont, 3rd Earl of Warwick (1140–1184)
- William Beaumont Army Medical Center a U.S. Army medical center in El Paso, Texas, United States
- William Beaumont Health System, a not-for-profit operator of 3 hospitals in U.S. state of Michigan
