= Christopher Widmer =

Canadian physician (1780–1858)

- Born: High Wycombe, England
- Died: Toronto, Canada
- Occupations: Physician and Surgeon

Christopher Widmer (May 15, 1780 – May 3, 1858) was a British born medical doctor and surgeon who spent much of his career in Canada.

== Early career ==
Before settling in York he was a staff cavalry surgeon on active duty during the Peninsula campaigns. He served in Spain and Portugal in the Peninsular War from 1808 to 1824 and in Canada from 1814 to 1817.

== Medical practice in York ==
He opened a medical practice in York in 1818 or 1819 where he practiced medicine alone. He was appointed to the Medical Board of Upper Canada in 1819 and between 1822 and 1858 he presided over the regulatory boards and helped to push for high standards of both medical practice and education in the area. On November 15, 1828 he announced a partnership with Dr. Diehl. He continued practicing medicine until his death, remaining a well respected doctor in the City of Toronto.

== Boards and honors ==
He helped to found the Toronto General Hospital and the King's College medical school. He was briefly the chancellor of the university in 1853 when he was elected as a protest over the threat of closing the medical school. He is well known for greatly advancing the practice of modern medicine in Canada.

== See also ==
- William Rawlins Beaumont
