= Robert Forman Horton =

English Nonconformist minister

- Born: 18 September 1855; London
- Died: 30 March 1934 (aged 78); London
- Occupation: Congregationalist minister
- Spouse: Violet Basden (m. 1918)

Robert Forman Horton (18 September 1855 – 30 March 1934) was an English clergyman and writer. He was minister of Lyndhurst Road Congregational Church, Hampstead, a position he held for 50 years.

== Early life and education ==
Horton born in London and was educated at Shrewsbury School and New College, Oxford, where he was awarded a First in classics. He was president of the Oxford Union in 1877. He became a fellow of his college in 1879 and lectured on history for four years. He was the first non-Anglican to have a teaching position at the Oxford University since the Reformation.

== Church role ==
In 1880 Horton accepted an invitation to become minister of the Lyndhurst Road Congregational Church, Hampstead, and subsequently took a very prominent part in church and denominational work. This included establishing a mission hall for the Hampstead church in Kentish Town, known as Lyndhurst Hall.

Horton delivered the Lyman Beecher lectures at Yale University in 1893. In 1898 he was chairman of the London Congregational Union, and in 1903 he was chair of the Congregational Union of England and Wales. In 1909 he took a prominent part in the 75th anniversary celebration of Hartford Theological Seminary.

His numerous publications spanned theological, critical, historical, biographical and devotional subjects.

== Animal welfare ==
Horton opposed blood sports and was an early vice-president of the League for the Prohibition of Cruel Sports.

== Personal life ==
Author Mary Beaumont was lifelong friends with Horton. Beaumont and her husband lived with Horton from 1902 until Beaumont's death in 1910. Horton married Violet Basden in 1918. Their daughter was born in 1928. Horton died in 1934, aged 78. There were 1500 mourners at his funeral held at Lyndhurst Road Congregational Church.

== Selected works ==
- The Courage of Conviction. An address delivered before the Oxford University Nonconformist Union (James Thornton, Oxford, 1882 )
- Inspiration and the Bible: An Inquiry (T.F. Unwin, 1889)
- The Book of Proverbs (Expositor's Bible series, 1891)
- Verbum Dei: The Yale Lectures on Preaching (Macmillan & Co New York, 1893)
- Alfred Tennyson: A Saintly Life (London J.M. Dent & Co; New York E.F. Dutton & Co, 1900)
- The Springs of Joy and Other Sermons (Fleming H. Revell Company, 1900)
- The Bible: A Missionary Book (Oliphant, Anderson & Ferrier, Edinburgh and London, 1904)
- The Early Church (Hodder & Stoughton New York, 1909)
- Great Issues (New York The Macmillan Company, 1909)
- "The Teaching of Jesus" (Isbister and Company Limited 1895)
- "Woman of The Old Testament"
- Studies in Womanhood (James Nisbet & Co, Limited 1904)
