= George Noble (engraver) =

English line-engraver

George Noble (fl. 1795–1806) was an English line-engraver. The son of Edward Noble, author of Elements of Linear Perspective, he was brother to Samuel Noble and William Bonneau Noble.

== Works ==
Noble made engravings for John Boydell's edition of Shakespeare (1802):

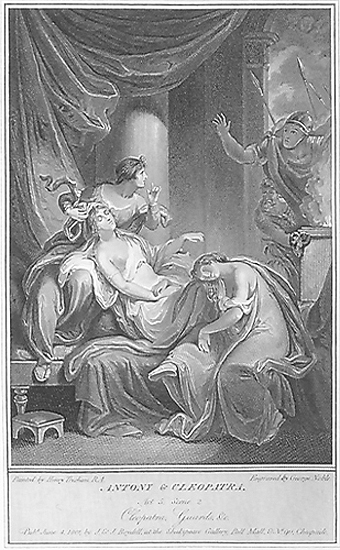
Death of Cleopatra by George Noble, after Henry Tresham

- "Borachio, Conrade, and Watchman", after Francis Wheatley, scene from Much Ado about Nothing;
- "Bassanio, Portia, and Attendants", after Richard Westall, from The Merchant of Venice;
- "Orlando and Adam", after Robert Smirke, from As you like it;
- "Desdemona in bed asleep", after Josiah Boydell, from Othello; and "Cleopatra, Guards, ...", after Henry Tresham, from Antony and Cleopatra.

He engraved also the subjects for Robert Bowyer's edition of David Hume's The History of England, 1806:

- "Canute reproving his Courtiers", "Henry VIII and Catharine Parr", "Charles I imprisoned in Carisbrooke Castle", "Lord William Russell's last Interview with his Family", and "The Bishops before the Privy Council", after Robert Smirke;
- "William I receiving the Crown of England", after Benjamin West; and
- "The Landing of William III at Torbay", after Thomas Stothard.

Noble's works included also:

- eighteen oval portraits of Admiral Lord Duncan and other naval officers, from miniatures by John Smart, which form part of a large plate designed by Robert Smirke, and engraved by James Parker, in commemoration of the battle of Camperdown on 11 October 1797;
- Maternal Instruction, after Christian Borckhardt;
- portraits of Lady Jane Grey and Rosamond Clifford; and
- illustrations to Oliver Goldsmith's Miscellaneous Works, from drawings by Richard Cook.

== Notes ==
Attribution

This article incorporates text from a publication now in the public domain: Lee, Sidney, ed. (1895). "Noble, George". Dictionary of National Biography. Vol. 41. London: Smith, Elder & Co.
