= Maurice Lobre =

French artist (1862–1951)

Maurice Lobre Boiserie de Versailles (ca. 1900)

Maurice Lobre (1862–1951) was a French artist. He was born in Bordeaux and died in Paris.

Lobre first gained recognition in the late 19th century when his work was displayed at the Salon du Champs-de-Mars. In 1888 he received an honorary mention and a travel grant from the Salon. That summer he traveled to Normandy where he stayed with Jacques-Émile Blanche. By this time, Blanche regularly hosted popular artists. Degas and Whistler were among his most prominent guests.

By the turn of the 20th century, Lobre produced work in the Intimist style. His motifs were dominated by comfortable bourgeois settings. In April 1905, his work was displayed alongside other practitioners of the style in a collective exhibit at Henri Gervex's galleries. The exhibit featured pieces by Édouard Vuillard – who coined the term "intimiste" to describe his own paintings – Henri Matisse, Hermann-Paul, René-Xavier Prinet and Ernest Laurent. Lobre was granted prominent space for his "delicious interiors of the Chateau of Versailles".

The star of 1908's Salon du Champs-de-Mars was unquestionably Rodin, but Lobre was "well represented", and his prominence increased during the period before the Great War.

Lobre was close to the poet Robert de Montesquiou who dedicated his collection of sonnets, Les Perles rouges (1899) to him.

When Europe descended into chaos in the summer of 1914, Maurice Lobre helped depict its atrocities. Some of the work he produced during this period is now part of the Smithsonian collection and grouped with fellow Intimists Hermann-Paul and Ernest Laurent.
