= Samuel Noble =

English engraver (1779–1853)

Samuel Noble (1779–1853) was an English engraver, and minister of the New Church (Swedenborgian).

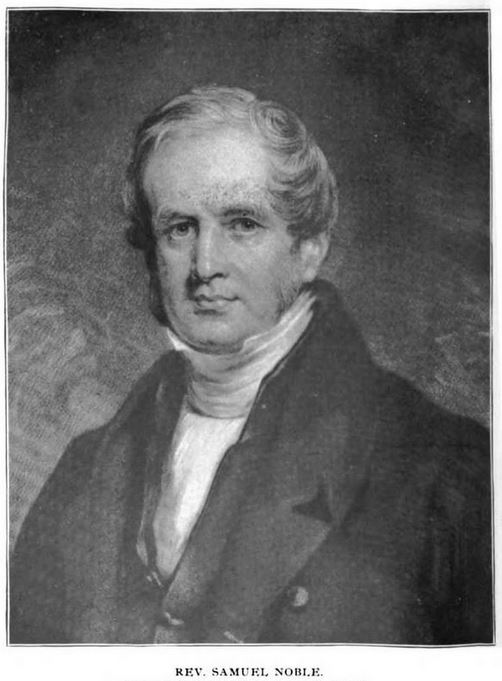
The Rev Samuel Noble from a portrait by R B Faulkner

== Life ==
He was born in London on 4 March 1779, son of Edward Noble (died 1784), a bookseller and author of a work on perspective, and brother of George Noble the engraver, and William Bonneau Noble the painter. His mother provided him with an education including Latin, and he was apprenticed to an engraver.

In his professional life, Noble became a skilled architectural engraver, and made a good income.

== Religious views and journalism ==
Noble's religious convictions were the result of his reaction in 1796 against Tom Paine's The Age of Reason. About 1798 he encountered Heaven and Hell by Emanuel Swedenborg, in the translation (1778) by William Cookworthy. He attached himself to the preaching of Joseph Proud, at Cross Street, Hatton Garden.

Proud had urged Noble to take on the ministry of the New Church by 1801, and he occasionally preached. He declined, in 1805, an invitation to take charge of the Cross Street congregation. He was one of the founders (1810) of the Society for printing and publishing the writings of Emanuel Swedenborg; and assisted in establishing (1812) a quarterly journal The Intellectual Repository and New Jerusalem Magazine, of which until 1830 he was the chief editor and principal writer.

== Ordination in the New Church ==
In 1819 Noble gave up his profession to become the successor of Thomas F. Churchill, M.D., a minister of the Cross Street congregation, which was then worshipping in Lisle Street, Leicester Square. He was ordained on Whitsunday, 1820. His ministry was effective, although he had a speech defect. The congregation, which had been declining, was increased by Noble to a more solid prosperity, and purchased (about 1829) the chapel in Cross Street vacated by Edward Irving.

In addition to his regular duties Noble worked as a lecturer in London and the provinces. His leadership of his denomination was not undisputed. His first controversy was with Charles Augustus Tulk, who was excluded from the society. Noble developed a doctrine which was viewed as a heresy by many of his co-religionists: he held that Jesus Christ was not resuscitated in the same body, but rather his body dissipated in the grave, and replaced at the resurrection by a new and divine frame. Hence arose the controversy between "resuscitationists" and "dissipationists"; John Clowes and Robert Hindmarsh rejected Noble's view, and his major antagonist was William Mason (1790–1863). In support of his position, a "Noble Society" was formed.

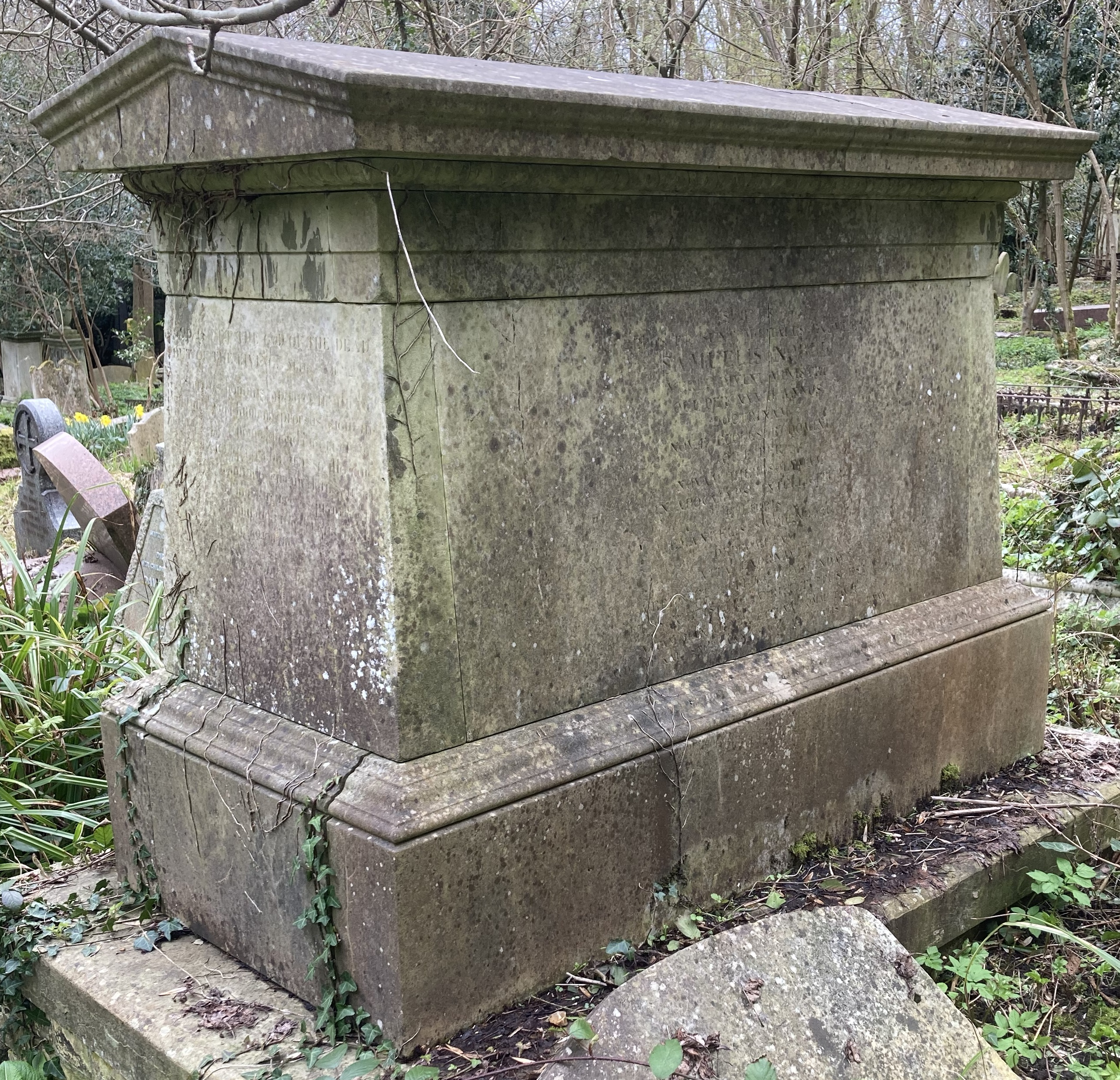
Grave of Samuel Noble in Highgate Cemetery

== Last years ==
In 1848 Noble started to suffer from cataract, and, in spite of several operations, became permanently blind. He died on 27 August 1853, and was buried in the dissenters area of the western side of Highgate cemetery.

The inscription on his grave read: "To the memory of The Rev. SAMUEL NOBLE, Minister Of the New Jerusalem Church, Cross Street, Hatton Garden, London, Author of " An Appeal to the Reflecting of all Denominations," " The Plenary Inspiration of the Sacred Scriptures Asserted," And other works in elucidation and defence of The doctrines of the New Church, Signified, in the revelation, by the New Jerusalem, As explained in the writings of the Lord's Servant Emanuel Swedenborg. THIS MONUMENT Is erected by his congregation and other friends, As a tribute of grateful affection For the spiritual benefits derived from his able And faithful ministry, and for his other labours In the cause of the true Christian Religion. Died August 27, 1853, in the 75th year of his age and the 34th of his ministry. God is not the God of the dead. But of the living. Matt. xxii. 32.

== Works ==
Noble's major publications were:

- The Plenary Inspiration of the Scriptures asserted and the Principles of their Composition investigated, London, 1825; 2nd edit. 1856.
- An Appeal on behalf of the … Doctrines … held by the … New Church, 1826; 2nd edit. 1838, enlarged and remodelled, omitting personal controversy; in the 12th edit. 1893, were added indexes; French translation St. Amand, 1862. This work of apologetics originated in lectures at Norwich, in reply to the Anti-Swedenborg (1824) by George Beaumont, minister at Ebenezer Chapel (Independent Methodist) there. This work converted Thomas Child.
- Important Doctrines of the True Christian Religion, &c., Manchester, 1846.
- The Divine Law of the Ten Commandments, 1848.

He revised, with help of amanuenses, the translation of Swedenborg's Heaven and Hell, giving it the title The Future Life (1851).

== Notes ==
Attribution

This article incorporates text from a publication now in the public domain: Lee, Sidney, ed. (1895). "Noble, Samuel". Dictionary of National Biography. Vol. 41. London: Smith, Elder & Co.
