= George Beaumont (minister) =

British nonconformist minister and controversialist (1800–1830)

George Beaumont (fl. 1800–1830) was a British nonconformist minister and controversialist of the Ebenezer Chapel, Norwich. He is known as an early pacifist writer.

== Background ==
According to an 1836 gazetteer, the Ebenezer Chapel in Norwich's Ber-Street was originally a Baptist meeting-house, and then was used by the Methodist New Connexion. George Beaumont represented Norwich at the New Connexion conferences of 1813 and 1814.

When Beaumont wrote The warrior's looking glass of 1808, British pacifists, outside of the Society of Friends, were isolated. An article in the Monthly Repository in 1809, taking a cue from the recent abolition of the slave trade of 1807, and Thomas Clarkson's 1808 book on it, speculated on the abolition of war (attribution by Ceadel of a letter from "J. H." is to John Holland (1766–1826)). Also in 1809, in the Monthly Magazine, "H. W." (Henry Wansey, of Unitarian views) called for a peace association.

David Bogue's "first clear call to form an organization on a pacifist basis" came in 1813. Beaumont was a subscriber to the Society for the Promotion of Permanent and Universal Peace in 1817.

== Works ==
- Fixed stars, or, An analyzation and refutation of astrology : the principles of this science being plainly laid open, and their absurdity and wickedness demonstrated : to which is added, the testimonies of many learned men against the science of astrology (1803)
- The warrior's looking glass: wherein is shewn from many high authorities, the trivial causes, cruel nature, direful effects and anti-Christian spirit and practice of war (1808). According to van der Linden, the idea of a "peace society" is first mooted in Beaumont's appendix to the selections in this pamphlet.
- The beggar's complaint, against extortions, corn factors, and against all oppressors (1809)
- The beggar's complaint, against rack-rent landlords, corn factors, great farmers, monopolizers, paper money makers, and war, and many other oppressors and oppressions: also, some observations on the conduct of the Luddites, in reference to the destruction of machinery &c. &c. (dated 1812). Beaumont, on his own account, had researched the story of Ned Ludd in Nottinghamshire, but lacked sympathy with machine-breaking. Despite the pamphlet's date, it comments on the executions at York of January 1813. Beaumont also observed the contentious nature of the apprenticeship system.
- The helmet: or an answer to the eighth resolution of the minutes of the conference, which was held at Manchester, in Whitsun-week, 1813 : containing also, an analyzation of the public character and conduct of several calumniators and political apostates (1814)
- The breast-plate : or, a review of certain proceedings at the Hanley Conference, held in Whitsun-week, 1814, relative to Mr. M--t and others. Together with explanations and refutations of certain reports, slanders, &c. (1814)
- Anti-Swedenborg (1824); replied to by Thomas Goyder, as "Gulielmas", and then Samuel Noble, for the New Jerusalem Church.
- The griper: being a letter to John Harvey, esq. in reply to his ungenerous animadversions, in a public assembly, in the old library room on 14 December, on my speech delivered at the weavers' meeting, on 7 December 1829, at the Pantheon, St. Stephen's Norwich; with many additional remarks, political, and theological, on the present state of our nation; and on general principles (1830)
