= Northern Liberator =

The Northern Liberator was a radical English newspaper. It was published between 21 October 1837 and 19 December 1840 from Newcastle upon Tyne. The paper was founded by Augustus Hardin Beaumont in 1837, after whose death it was owned by Robert Blakey and Thomas Doubleday, the latter of whom served as the paper's editor.
