= William Bonneau Noble =

English painter (1780–1831)

William Bonneau Noble (1780–1831) was an English landscape painter in water-colours.

== Life ==
Born in London on 13 September 1780, he was youngest son of Edward Noble, author of Elements of Linear Perspective, and brother of Samuel and George Noble. His mother was sister of William Noble (died 1805, not closely related to his father), a drawing-master, who succeeded to the practice of Jacob Bonneau whose daughter he had married.

Noble began life as a teacher of drawing. He spent two summers in Wales sketching, and then sent water-colour paintings to the Royal Academy. In 1809 three of these, a View of Machynlleth, North Wales, Montgomery Castle, and a View near Dolgelly, were hung. Next year, however, his drawings were rejected, and although he had two views in the exhibition of 1811, his life went downhill.

In November 1825 Noble made a suicide attempt. He died in Somers Town, London, on 14 September 1831, leaving in manuscript a long poem entitled The Artist.

== Notes ==
Attribution

This article incorporates text from a publication now in the public domain: Lee, Sidney, ed. (1895). "Noble, William Bonneau". Dictionary of National Biography. Vol. 41. London: Smith, Elder & Co.
