= Henry de Beaumont (disambiguation) =

Henry de Beaumont may refer to:

- Henry de Beaumont, 1st Earl of Warwick (died 1123)
- Henry de Beaumont, 5th Earl of Warwick (died 1229)
- Henry de Beaumont (died 1340), 4th Earl of Buchan (jure uxoris) and 1st Baron Beaumont

== See also ==
- Henry Beaumont (disambiguation)
- Harry Beaumont (1888–1966), American film director
