= Thomas Child (minister) =

Scottish minister and writer

Thomas Childs (1839–1906) was a Scottish minister of The New Church and writer.

== Life ==
The son of John Child, a heckle-comb maker, and his wife Grace M'Kay, he was born at Arbroath on 10 December 1839, and brought up in the Free Church of Scotland. He was put under a relative at Darlington to learn tanning, but ran away.

After serving apprenticeship to a chemist, Child was employed by manufacturing chemists at Horncastle; there he joined the Congregationalists and, with a view to its ministry, studied at Airedale College (1862–7). As a congregational minister he was at Castleford in the West Riding of Yorkshire (1867–8), and Sittingbourne in Kent (1870).

Reading the Appeal by Samuel Noble led Child to accept the doctrines of Emanuel Swedenborg. As a preacher of the New Church, he officiated at Newcastle-on-Tyne (1872), moving to Lowestoft (1874) and to Bath, Somerset (1876), where he was ordained on 15 October 1878.

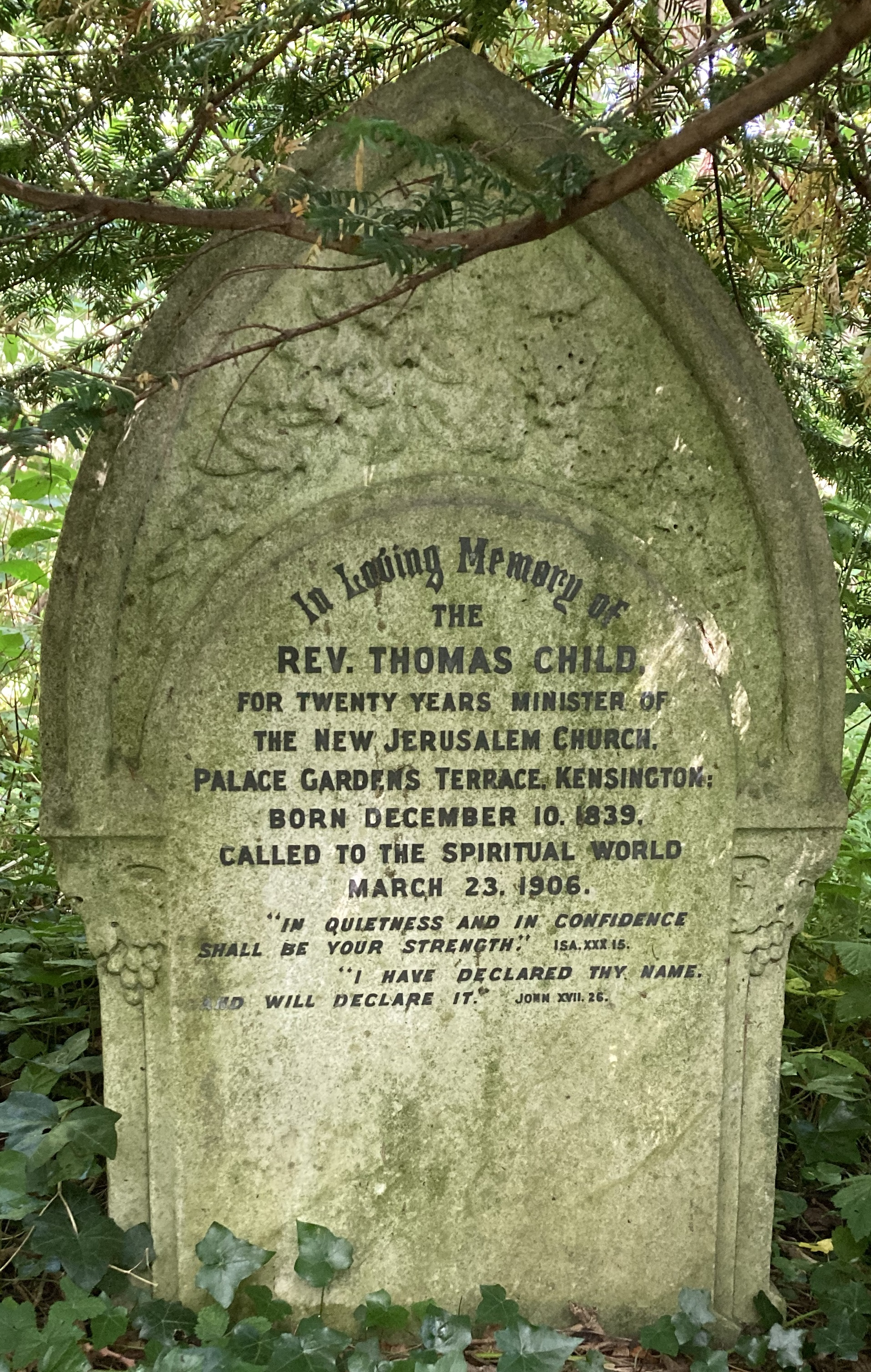
Grave of Thomas Child (minister) in Highgate Cemetery

In March 1886 Child became assistant at the chapel in Palace Gardens Terrace, Kensington, to Jonathan Bayley, who died on 12 May that year when Child became his successor.

He died on 23 March 1906 and was buried on the western side of Highgate Cemetery.

== Works ==
Child wrote on New Church principles, with Sir Isaac Pitman supporting some publications. His major work was Root Principles in Rational and Spiritual Things (1905; 2nd edit. 1907), prompted by Ernst Haeckel's treatment of the world riddle, and commended by Alfred Russel Wallace. He also wrote:

- Are New Churchmen Christians?, 1882.
- The Key of Life, 1887 (sermons at Kensington, with forms of prayer).
- Is there an Unseen World?, 1888–9.
- The Church and Science, 1892.
- The Glorification of the Lord's Humanity, 1906; lectures delivered in 1894, with biographical sketch by William Alfred Presland and James Speirs (posthumous).
- The Bible: its Rational Principle of Interpretation, 1907 (posthumous).

== Family ==
Child married Louisa Hadkinson in October 1870.

== Notes ==
Attribution

This article incorporates text from a publication now in the public domain: Lee, Sidney, ed. (1912). "Child, Thomas". Dictionary of National Biography (2nd supplement). Vol. 1. London: Smith, Elder & Co.
