= Beamont =

Beamont is an English surname, a variant of "Beaumont". Notable people with this surname include the following:

- Roland Beamont (1920–2001), British fighter and test pilot
- William Beamont (1797–1889), British solicitor and philanthropist
- William John Beamont (1828–1868), English clergyman

== See also ==
- Beaumont (surname)
