= Édouard de Beaumont =

French painter (died 1888)

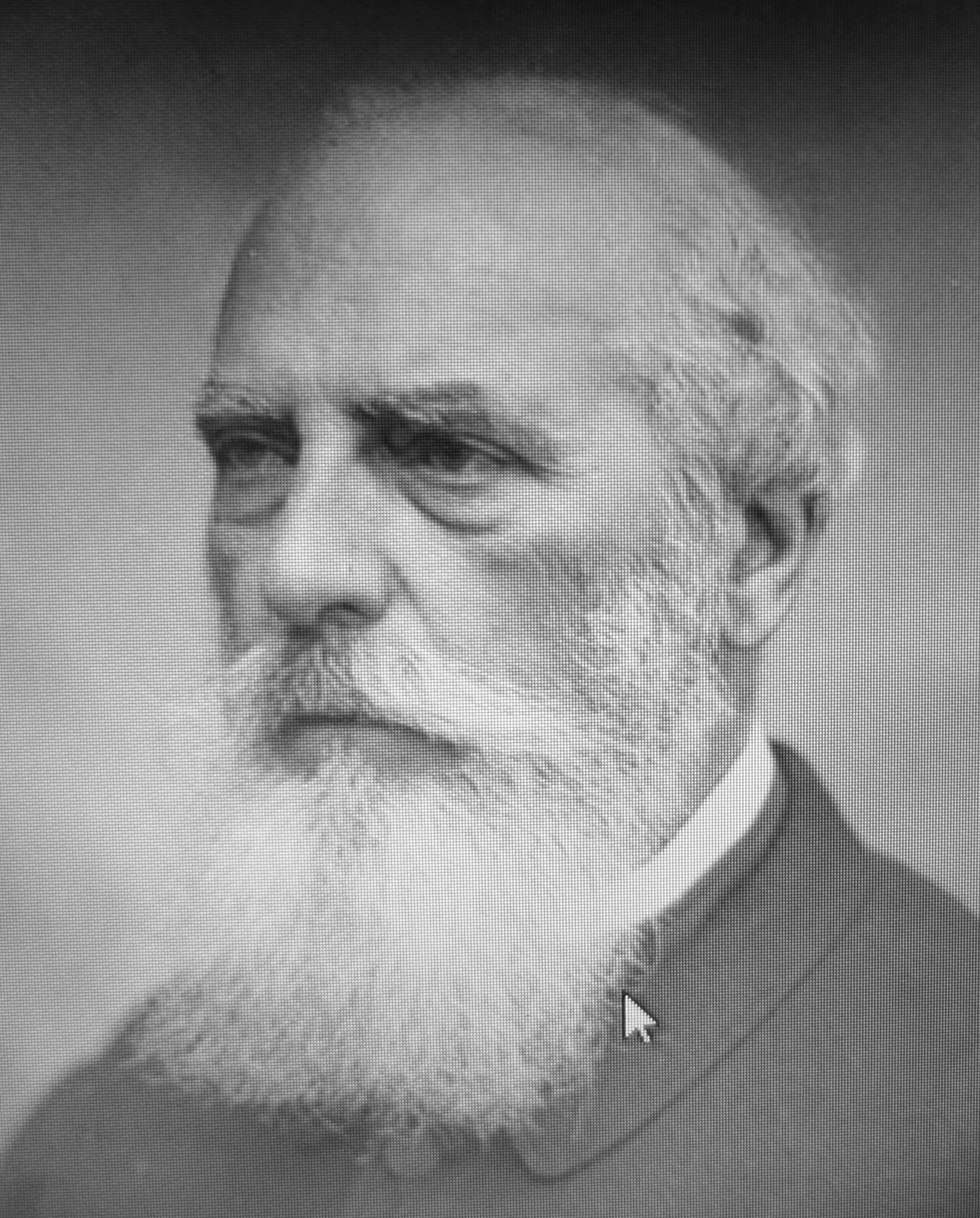
Image of C.E. De Beaumont

Charles-Édouard de Beaumont (1812/1821, in Lannion – 12 January 1888, in Paris), better known as Édouard de Beaumont, was a French painter, watercolourist, draughtsman, illustrator and lithographer. He is known for religious subjects, genre scenes and landscapes.

== Sources ==
- Sagner, Karin (2021). "Beaumont, Edouard de". Allgemeines Künstlerlexikon (online ed.). Berlin, New York: K. G. Saur.
- "Beaumont, Charles Édouard de". Benezit Dictionary of Artists (online ed.). Oxford University Press. 2011. doi:10.1093/benz/9780199773787.article.B00014586.
