= Henry Wansey =

English antiquary

Henry Wansey (10 August 1751 – 19 July 1827) was an English antiquary, who was by trade a clothier, but retired from business in middle life and devoted his leisure to travel, to literature, and to antiquarian research.

== Life ==
Wansey was the son of George and Esther Wansey of Warminster, Wiltshire. He was a member of the Bath and West of England Agricultural Society, in which he served the office of vice-president, and in connection with which he published in 1780 A Letter to the Marquis of Lansdowne on the Subject of the Late Tax on Wool, in which he pointed out the policy mistakes in the tax, and maintained that commercial restrictions of such a nature were generally injurious.

In 1789, Wansey was elected a fellow of the Society of Antiquaries, in 1794 he visited the United States, and in 1796 he published his observations under the title An Excursion to the United States of America, Salisbury; 2nd edit. 1798. While residing at Salisbury in 1801 he turned his attention to the condition of poorhouses, and published in that year a pamphlet entitled Thoughts on Poorhouses, particularly that of Salisbury, with a view to their reform. Wansey, however, principally occupied himself with the study of local antiquities, and for some years he laboured in conjunction with Sir Richard Colt Hoare in preparing the account of the hundred of Warminster for Hoare's History of Wiltshire. The volume containing Wansey's labours was not, however, published until 1831, four years after his death.

Wansey died at Warminster on 19 July 1827. By his wife Elizabeth he had one daughter, Emma, who died in childhood.

== Other works ==
Besides the works referred to, Wansey was the author of:

- Wool encouraged without Exportation, published by the Highland Society of Scotland, Edinburgh, 1791.
- A Letter to the Bishop of Salisbury on his late Charge to the Clergy of his Diocese, London, 1798.
- A Visit to Paris in June 1814, London, 1814.

He also contributed papers to the Archæologia of the Society of Antiquaries.
