= Damien Beaumont =

Australian broadcaster

- Occupations: Broadcaster, musician
- Known for: ABC Classic broadcaster
- Website: www.abc.net.au/listen/classic/damien-beaumont/7952922

Damien Beaumont is a broadcaster and musician. He is most notable for his work as a broadcaster on Australian Broadcasting Corporation radio station ABC Classic.

== Career ==
Beaumont graduated from the Elder Conservatorium of Music in Adelaide, where he studied music. He continued his training as an operatic baritone in England, returned to Australia in 1999 to join the Australian Broadcasting Corporation.

Beaumont started at ABC Classic as a marketing manager, and was responsible for establishing the Classic 100 Countdowns in 2001. His first stint on air was presenting music overnight, filling in after the sudden death of Martin Hibble.

Beaumont now works as a presenter at ABC Classic where he presents "Evenings".

In September 2024, he announced that he would be retiring in November.
