= Joseph Beaumont (minister) =

British minister

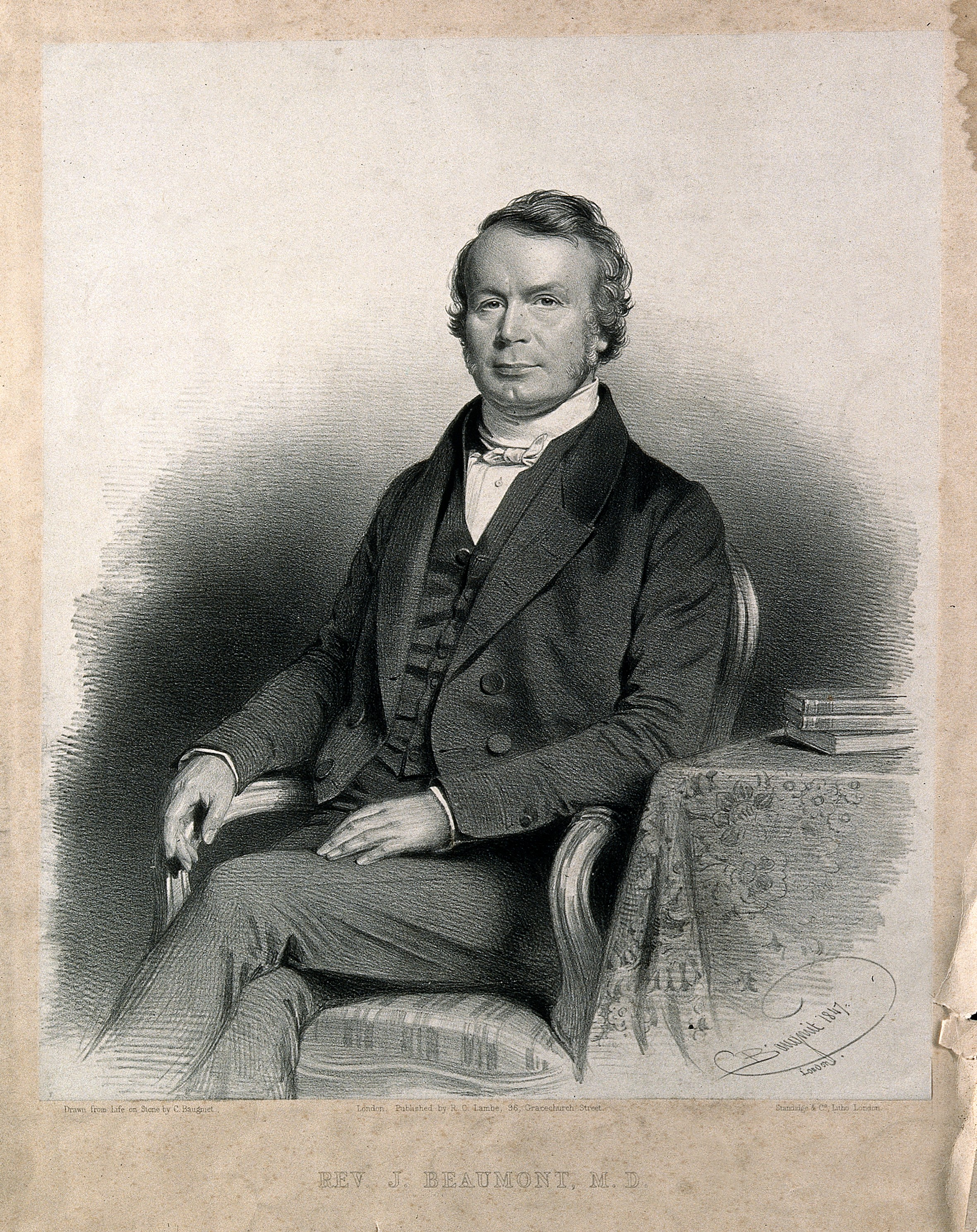
- Lithograph of Joseph Beaumont, by Charles Baugniet, 1847
- Born: 1794
- Died: 21 January 1855 (aged 60–61)

Joseph Beaumont M.D. (1794–1855) was an English physician, known as a Wesleyan Methodist minister.

== Life ==
Beaumont was born at Castle Donington, in Leicestershire, 19 March 1794. He belonged to a family which had lived more than four hundred years at Longley, a farm on the hillside above Holmfirth, in the West Riding of Yorkshire. His family was said to be connected with that of Francis Beaumont, the dramatist. His father was the Rev. John Beaumont, an itinerant preacher among the Wesleyan Methodists, and his mother was a daughter of Colonel Home of Gibraltar. From them he inherited a keen taste for music and the fine arts.

== Education ==
He was educated at Kingswood School, near Bristol, founded by Wesley for training the sons of his preachers. While there young Beaumont was afflicted with a serious impediment in his speech, but, by great pains and resolution, he so completely mastered it as to become a most fluent and impassioned speaker.

== Career ==
Contrary to the wishes of his maternal relatives, who wanted him to become a clergyman in the established church, he chose the ministry of the Wesleyans, as his father had done. After spending a short time in the shop of a dispensing chemist in Macclesfield, he commenced the itinerancy in 1813, and soon became widely known as an eloquent and popular preacher. He had all the qualities of a true orator. He possessed a sweet and powerful voice, a fertile imagination, and much literary cultivation. Dr. Beaumont was in great request as the preacher of sermons on special occasions, and vast crowds assembled to hear him whenever he appeared in the pulpit or on the platform. He pleaded effectively for many benevolent objects and public institutions outside the limits of his own church. He had a deep-rooted antipathy to hierarchical assumptions, and in the controversies which agitated the Methodist community he always took the liberal side. His strong sympathy with the weak and the oppressed occasionally led him into error. Beaumont was subject to the law of Methodism which requires its ministers to change their pastoral charge every three years. In two instances, however, at the urgent request of the people, he was reappointed, after an interval of years, to Edinburgh and Hull, in each of which he had previously laboured. It was during his first residence in Edinburgh that he obtained from the university the degree of doctor in medicine. He exercised his ministry for six years in Liverpool, eight years in London, and three years each in Nottingham and Bristol.

In the year 1821 he married Miss Susan Morton, daughter of Mr. Morton of Hardshaw Hall, near Prescot, Lancashire, and sister of the wife of Dr. Morrison, the pioneer of missions in China. By this lady, who survived him, he had a large family. He was elected by the conference of 1846 as a member of the legal hundred. On Sunday morning, 21 January 1855, he entered the pulpit of Waltham Street Chapel, Hull, and opened the service by announcing the lines— Thee while the first Archangel sings, :He hides his face behind his wings; and as the congregation was singing the second of these lines he sank down on the spot where he stood, and, without sound or motion, died. He was in the sixty-first year of his age.

He published a few occasional sermons, and in 1838 a volume containing "Memoirs of Mrs. Mary Tatham, late of Nottingham". A posthumous volume of Select Sermons by him was issued in 1859. (Note: Life, with portrait, London, 1856) (Note: Minutes of the Methodist Conferences, volume xiii., for 1855)
