= Percy Beaumont =

English footballer

Personal information
- Full name: Percy Beaumont
- Date of birth: 3 September 1897
- Place of birth: Mexborough, England
- Date of death: 1967 (aged 69–70)
- Position: Half-back

Senior career*
Years	Team	Apps	(Gls)
1918–1919	Mexborough Rovers		
1919–1921	Sheffield United	34	(3)
1921–1926	Barnsley	138	(7)
1926–1927	Southend United	30	(0)
1927	Mexborough Athletic		
Total		202	(10)
- * Club domestic league appearances and goals

Percy Beaumont (3 September 1897 – 1967) was an English footballer who played in the Football League for Barnsley, Sheffield United and Southend United.
