= Augustus Hardin Beaumont =

English abolitionist

Personal details
- Born: 1798 New York, United States
- Died: 1838 (aged 39–40)

Augustus Hardin Beaumont (1798 – 1838) was an American-born abolitionist, journalist, and radical politician in Jamaica and England.

== Life ==
Born in New York, Beaumont was raised alongside his two brothers by his slaveholder uncle in Jamaica following the early deaths of his parents. Though brought up to become a plantation manager, a distaste for slavery led Beaumont to pursue a career in journalism and politics in Jamaica. He was elected to the Common Council of Kingston in 1827 and as a member of the House of Assembly of Jamaica in 1829. During a stay in Europe in 1830, he and his brother participated in the Belgian Revolution before returning to Jamaica. Following the failure of his newspaper, The Isonomist in 1834, Beaumont left Jamaica permanently for England, during which time his views became increasingly radically pro-working class and anti-slavery. In 1837, he founded the Northern Liberator, which was purchased by his friend and mayor of Morpeth, Robert Blakey following Beaumont's early death in 1838.
