= Louise Beaumont =

Canadian handball player (born 1959)

Louise Beaumont (born January 23, 1959) is a former Canadian handball player who competed in the 1976 Summer Olympics.

Born in Granby, Quebec, Beaumont was part of the Canadian handball team, which finished sixth in the Olympic tournament. She played four matches and scored two goals.
