= Harold Beaumont =

English cricketer

Harold Beaumont (14 October 1916 – 15 November 2003) was an English first-class cricketer, who played 28 games of first-class cricket for Yorkshire in the first two seasons after World War II.

Born in Thongsbridge, Yorkshire, England, Beaumont was a right-handed batsman, he scored 716 runs at 17.60 with a top score of 60. He took nine wickets with his right arm medium pace at 26.22, with a first-class career best of 4 for 31. A fine outfielder, he learnt his cricket with Thongbridge Cricket Club in the Huddersfield Cricket League, and played for Yorkshire Second XI in 1938 and 1939. Engaged by Spen Victoria in 1946, he was a professional at Crompton Cricket Club, Lancashire in 1949. In 1960, Beaumont scored 75 against Meltham Cricket Club, when Meltham won the Sykes Cup Final. Several of his relations played in the Huddersfield Cricket League.

He died, aged 87, in November 2003 in Huddersfield, Yorkshire.
