= María Josefa Huarte Beaumont =

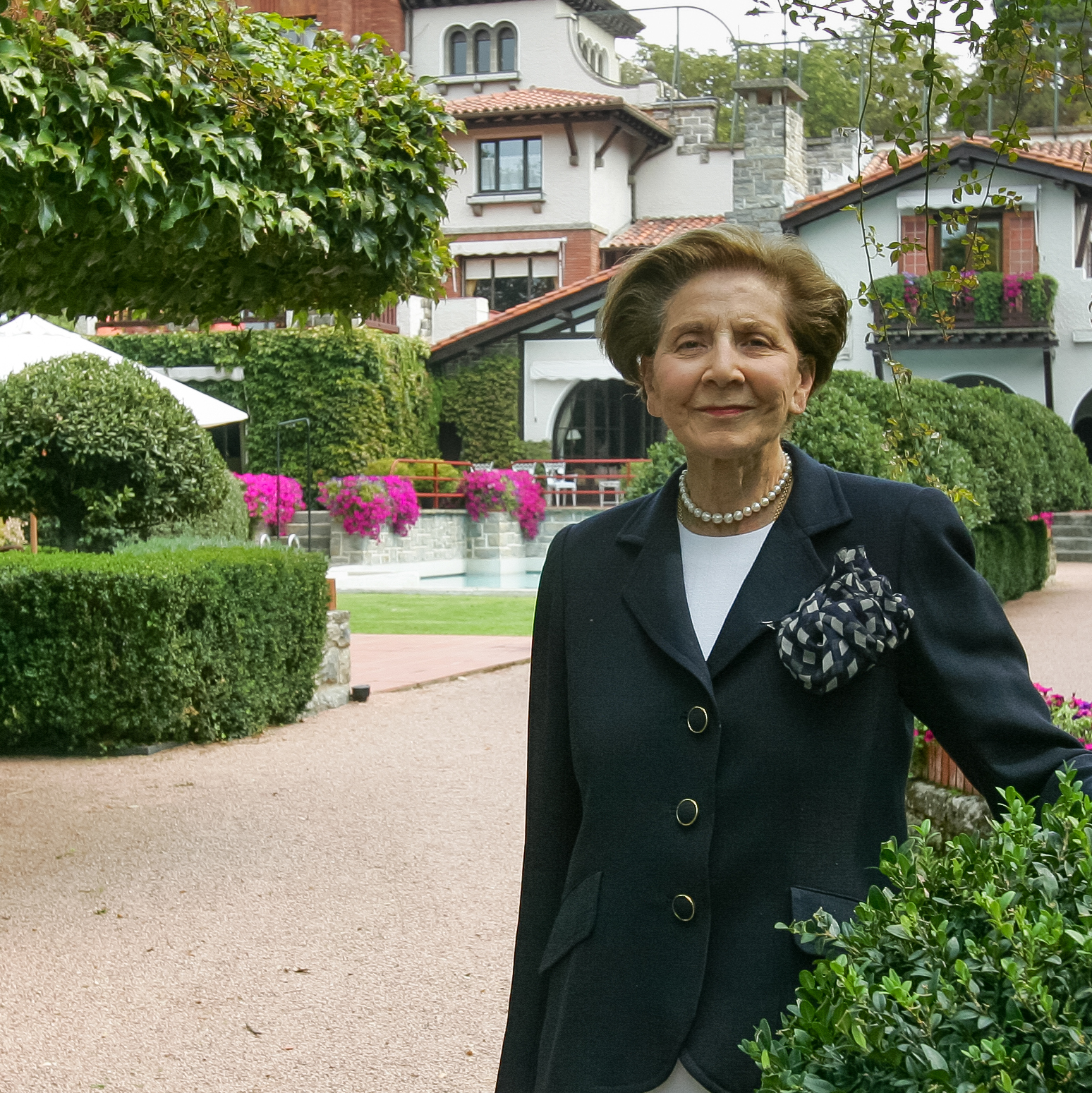
- Born: 25 May 1927; Pamplona
- Died: 8 February 2015 (aged 87); Pamplona
- Known for: donating her modern art collection to the University of Navarra

María Josefa Huarte Beaumont (25 May 1927 – 8 February 2015) was a Spanish art collector and philanthropist. She is known for donating her modern art collection (and a building to put it in) to the University of Navarra.

== Life ==
Beaumont was born in Pamplona. Her father was Felix Huarte who was a successful builder. Her mother was Adriana Beaumont Galduroz. She was the third of four children. Beaumont spent time travelling with her husband and she would see and buy modern art that appealed to her.

She decided to leave her collection to the University of Navarra in 2008 and she commissioned the architect Rafael Moneo to build a home for it. The collection of 48 pieces of art was by nineteen artists. The focus of the collection is on geometric contemporary abstract art by Spanish artists but there are exceptions to this. Moneo commented on how Beaumont did not interfere with his design but was very supportive of his proposals. Moneo chose an abstract design for the new building to mirror the collection. The building is part of the university but it is intended to be a cultural hub as well for Pamplona.

== Death and legacy ==
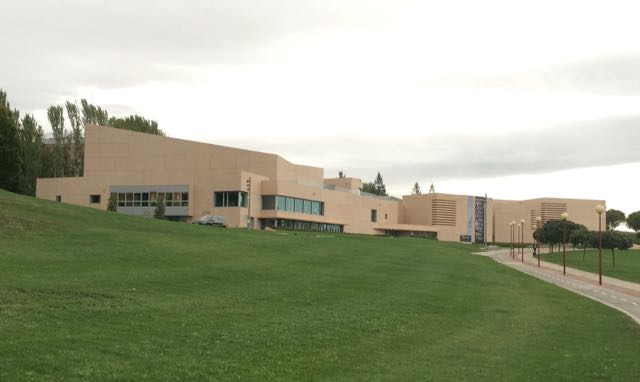
Museum Universidad de Navarra

Beaumont died in her home city, Pamplona, in 2015. In January 2015, the Museum of the University of Navarra was inaugurated by King Felipe VI and houses her donated collection.. This great collections of contemporary art included works by Pablo Picasso, Mark Rothko and Wassily Kandinsky. Her donated collection included not only paintings but also thousands of photographs by leading photographers going back to the nineteenth century.

== Private life ==
She was married to Javier Vidal, they had no children.
