= Steve Beaumont =

Australian rules footballer (1951–2023)

Personal information
- Full name: Steven Kenneth Beaumont
- Born: 1 April 1951
- Died: 20 November 2023 (aged 72)
- Original team: Cooee
- Height: 179 cm (5 ft 10 in)
- Weight: 76 kg (168 lb)
- Position: Rover

Playing career^{1}
Years	Club	Games (Goals)
1974–76	Essendon	37 (46)
- ^{1} Playing statistics correct to the end of 1976.

Steven Kenneth Beaumont (1 April 1951 – 20 November 2023) was an Australian rules footballer who played with Essendon in the Victorian Football League (VFL).

Recruited from Cooee in Tasmania, he had been the leading goalkicker in the North West Football Union (NWFU) in 1972. After his stint with Essendon he returned to the NWFU, playing with Burnie before becoming captain-coach of his old team, Cooee.

Beaumont was inducted into the Tasmanian Football Hall of Fame in 2011.
