= Albanis Beaumont =

English painter

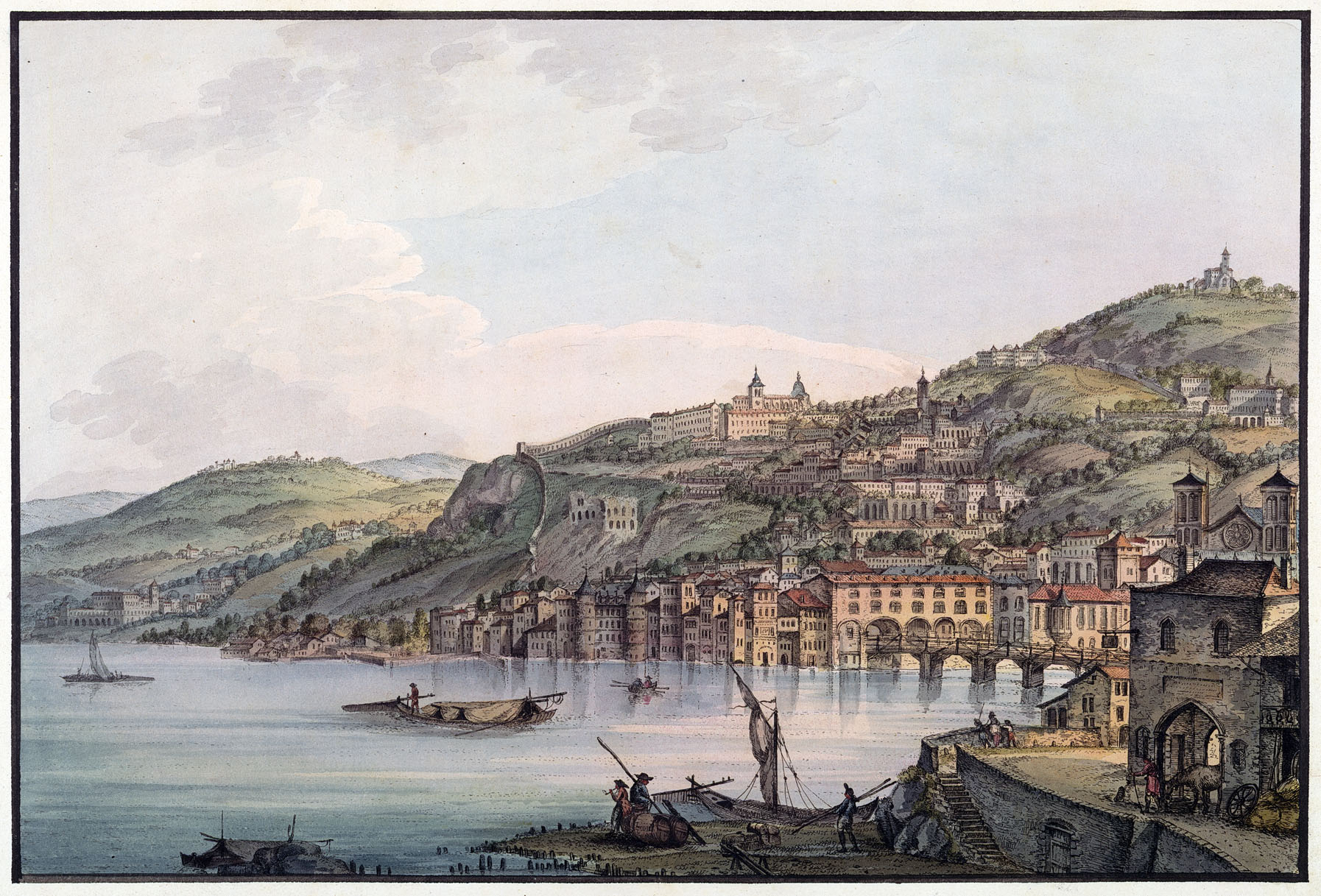
View of Lyons from Beaumont's Travels from France to Italy through the Lepontine Alps, 1800, Londres.

Sir Albanis Beaumont (ca. 1755–1812) was an Italian-born English draughtsman, aquatint engraver, and landscape painter. He was born in Piedmont, but naturalised in England.

Between 1787 and 1806, he published a great number of views in the south of France, in the Alps, and in Italy. There is a short account of him in Füssli's Lexicon (1806):

Probably a Piedmontese, and the son of Claudio Francesco, he carried the sounding title of "Architecte pensionné de D. M. le roi de Sardaigne à la suite de S. A. R. le duc de Gloucester." In 1787 he exhibited a set of twelve views in Italy, mostly in the neighbourhood of Nice . . . and in 1788 yet other twelve views (mediocre enough) in the neighbourhood of Chamonny and the lake of Geneva, drawn and etched by himself. The value of these is due to the beautiful colouring added by Bernard Lory the elder. Soon after he betook himself and his landscape factory (Prospektfabrik) to London, and there associated himself with a certain Thomas Gowland as his partner, and Cornelius Apostool as engraver. In the last ten years of the eighteenth century this firm turned out a new series of views in Switzerland, France, and Savoy, which are about on a level with their precursors, but had not the advantage of Bernard Lory's tasteful brush. It must be acknowledged, however, that the clean firm lines of Apostool's needle add as much to this series as the other lost from the flaccid and insecure draughtsmanship of Beaumont. A description of these plates and their prices (high at times) is found in Meusel's Museum.

He later took to landscape painting, exhibiting in 1806 A Storm at Sea, in which the waves are said to have been drawn with great truth. There is a list of his works is in the 1881 edition of Nagler, and a rather long account of him in 1835 one. (Note: Füssli's Allgemeines Künstler-Lexicon, 1806) (Note: Meusel's Museum, xiv. 36-38) (Note: Meusel's Neue Miscel. 476, 477) (Note: Nagler's Künstler-Lexicon, 1835 and 1881.)
