= Agnes Beaumont =

English religious autobiographer

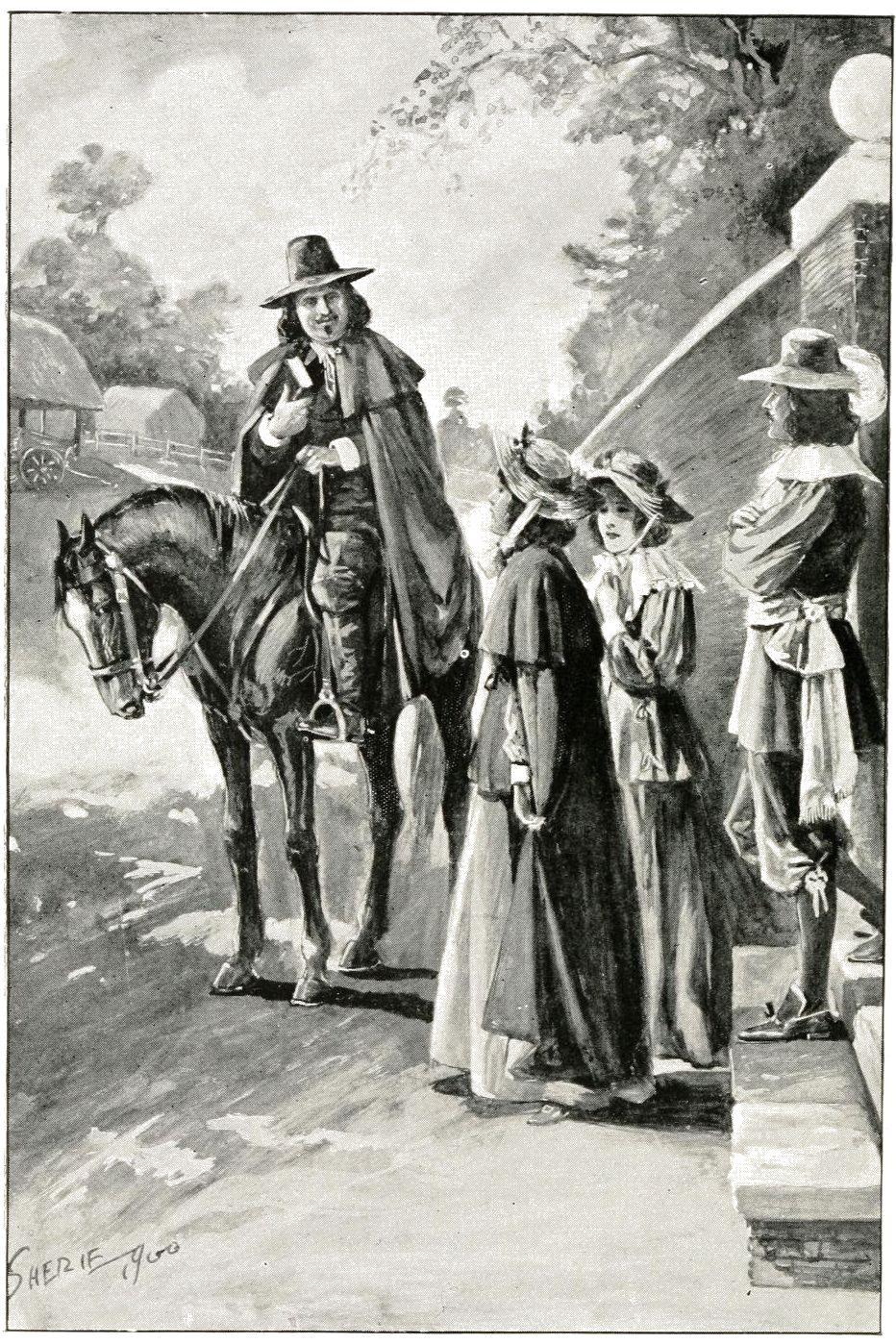
- much later illustration of her and John Bunyan
- Born: Baptised 1652; Edworth, Bedfordshire
- Died: 1720

Agnes Beaumont (Baptised 1652 – 1720) was an English religious autobiographer, who was accused of having a sexual relationship with the Puritan preacher John Bunyan and conspiring with him to murder her father. She wrote an autobiography that declared her innocence of these charges.

== Life ==
Beaumont was born in Edworth near Biggleswade and she was baptised in 1652. Her parents were John and Mary Beaumont of Pirton.

Beaumont's family did not follow the established Christian denomination of Anglicanism so it was unsurprising when she joined a church in Gamlingay led by the evangelist John Bunyan. However her (now widowed) father did not approve and forbade her to get involved. Agnes was given a lift by Bunyan and rode pillion on his horse. John Beaumont then threw her out of the family home, and refused to let her back in unless she promised to stop attending the church meetings. After spending two days outside at the height of winter, she agreed to his demand.

This all became notable when her father died the following night. A heart attack is a possible cause of death but a neighbour, Mr. Feery, alleged that she had poisoned her father. In her autobiography Beaumont implied that Feery, a lawyer, had once intended to marry her, but that once she had begun attending church meetings he had "turned against me".

Murder was a capital offence, but Beaumont was found to be not involved by the coroner and his jury. Although Beaumont had escaped being potentially burnt at the stake, rumours abounded that she and Bunyan had been lovers. The next year Mr. Feery spread a rumour that she had set fire to a house. The rumours of her sexual relationship continued and Bunyan was still having to deny them in later editions of his autobiography. She wrote her account of this in about 1674.

Beaumont married Thomas Warren of Cheshunt in 1702. He died in 1707 and the following year she married Samuel Storey who was a prosperous fishmonger, but she still owned half of her husband's land in Cheshunt. She died on 28 November 1720 and she was buried at Tilehouse Street Baptist chapel in Hitchin. This was her church and one that she had helped to pay for. Samuel Storey survived her.

== Legacy ==
Vera Camden suggests that Beaumont's vigorous public defence of her character is all the more remarkable because the voices of female dissenters had become increasingly silenced after the Restoration of the Monarchy in 1660:

"What is remarkable about Agnes Beaumont is that she followed Bunyan’s model: that she silenced her persecutors in a community courtroom rather than lapsing into the exemplary silence of the woman, and, most importantly, that she recorded her triumph for the edification of the saints."

Beaumont's autobiographical narrative was first published in print in An Abstract of the Gracious Dealings of God with Several Eminent Christians in their Conversions and Sufferings (1760) with additional text by the Reverend Samuel James of Hitchin. The volume proved popular, with ten editions published over the next eighty years.

In 1812 a plaque was placed on Tile House Baptist church to record that she was a member of the church under the guidance of John Bunyan.

In 1901 Beaumont was appearing in a book of girl heroines.

The nineteen-page source manuscript of Beaumont's autobiography, "The Narrative of the Persecution of Agnes Beaumont", was purchased by the British Museum in the 1870s, and is now preserved in the British Library
