= Clark Beaumont =

Australian artistic duo

- Born: Formed in 2010
- Education: Queensland University of Technology
- Known for: Video, Installation, Performance Art
- Awards: Finalists The Churchie Art Prize
- Website: Clark Beaumont's website

Sarah Clark and Nicole Beaumont, known as Clark Beaumont, are an artistic collaborative duo who formed in 2010, and currently live and work in Brisbane, Australia. The pair work primarily in the mediums of video and live or mediated performance, and have presented live performances and videos at festivals, exhibitions, and events nationally and internationally.

== Work ==
Clark Beaumont work primarily in the mediums of video and live or mediated performance. Their work explores questions of identity, female subjectivity, intimacy, and interpersonal relationships, often with themselves as the subject matter for their work. Their collaboration means exploring the social and physical dynamics of working together to create artwork. Through performance and time-based media, they experiment with multiple feminine personas and characters, recreating and reflecting on the individual and intersubjective experiences that contribute to the practice. The duo aims to create artwork that creatively and critically engages elements of humour and absurdity to explore how contemporary constructs of female identity and subjectivity are formed.

== Exhibitions ==
Since beginning their collaboration, the duo have presented live performances, videos and installations nationally and internationally in both group and solo shows. Solo exhibitions include:

- Heart to Heart at Roslyn Oxley9 Gallery, Sydney;
- Feeling It Out at Kings ARI, Melbourne;
- Seen at JIWAR, Barcelona (2013);
- She'll Be Right at Boxcopy, Brisbane (2012); and
- Pear Shaped at Current Projects, Brisbane (2012).

Group exhibitions include:

- "GoMA Q: Contemporary Queensland Art" at the Gallery of Modern Art, Brisbane (2015);
- "Performance Presence / Video Time" at the Australian Experimental Art Foundation, Adelaide (2015);
- Art as a Verb at Monash University Museum of Art (2014);
- Presence/Absence at Spiro Grace Art Rooms, Brisbane (2014);
- Rinse & Repeat at The Hangar, Brisbane (2013);
- 13 Rooms at Pier 2/3, Sydney; Pivotal at BUS Projects, Melbourne (2013);
- Hatched at the Perth Institute of Contemporary Arts, Perth; SafARI (2012), Sydney; the Brisbane Emerging Art Festival, Brisbane (2012);
- Exist-ence at the Judith Wright Centre of Contemporary Arts, Brisbane's Sixty Sixty at Metro Arts, Brisbane (2011); and
- Introspection at the Brisbane Institute of Art, Brisbane.

=== 13 Rooms ===
In April 2013, Clark Beaumont were included in the major exhibition 13 Rooms, produced by Kaldor Public Art Projects in Sydney, Australia. The exhibition was curated by Hans Ulrich Obrist and Klaus Biesenbach, and included other performance works by numerous well-known international artists such as Damien Hirst, Marina Abramović, Tino Sehgal, Allora & Calzadilla, Santiago Sierra, and John Baldessari. Clark Beaumont's inclusion in the exhibition, as comparatively younger and lesser known artists, was the subject of much media coverage within Australia and overseas. In the 13 Rooms catalog, Clark Beaumont's work was described as: "...extend[ing] a historical trajectory of conceptual art and present Coexisting, 2013. Explicitly positioning the artists as artwork, the pair will spend the duration of the exhibition on a plinth with a surface area slightly too small for two people to comfortably occupy."
