= Jean-Baptiste-Jacques Élie de Beaumont =

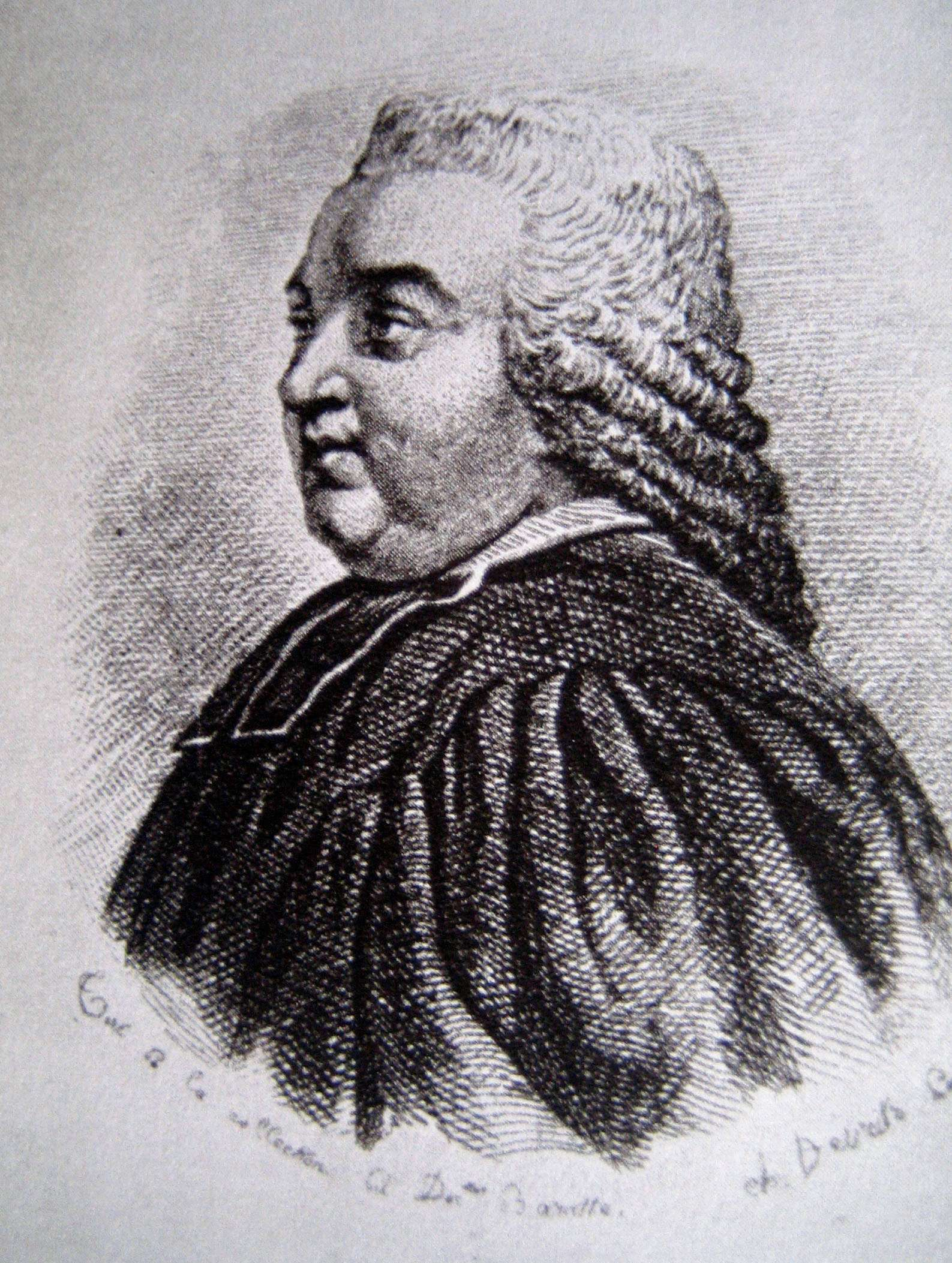
Jean-Baptiste-Jacques Élie de Beaumont, 1732-1786

Jean-Baptiste-Jacques Élie de Beaumont (1732 Carentan–January 10, 1786 Paris) was a French lawyer from an old Norman Protestant family.

Élie de Beaumont was called to the bar in 1752 and was an attorney for the Parlement of Normandy, and made his name at the Paris bar, before being forced by poor health, from giving pleadings. He then confined himself to publishing legal briefs, where he showed a keen sense of fairness, the art of presenting the facts and gathering evidence, which made him a European reputation.

His claim to fame is the Memoir for the Children of Calas (Paris, 1762, 4to). The brilliant part he took in the Calas affair earned him, among Protestants, gratitude and a high reputation. He was elected a Fellow of the Royal Society in 1765.

His wife was the writer Anne-Louise Élie de Beaumont and his grandson, the geologist Jean-Baptiste Élie de Beaumont.

== Publications ==
- Mémoire pour réhabiliter le nom de Calas, Paris, 1762, in-4°
- Mémoire a consulter, et consultation pour les enfans de defunt Jean Calas, marchand a Toulouse, Paris, Merlin, 1765
- Mémoire pour dame Anne-Rose Cabibel, veuve Calas, et pour ses enfans, sur le renvoi aux Requêtes de l'Hôtel au Souverain, ordonné par arrêt du Conseil du 4 juin 1764, Paris, Le Breton, 1762
- Addition de Mémoire, pour les sieurs & demoiselles Potin, neveux & niéces de la dame de Maincy, héritiers aux meubles & acquêts, & propres paternels; contre la dame & la demoiselle Desjardins, Paris, L. Cellot, 1764
- Mémoire a consulter, et consultation pour Pierre-Paul Sirven, Commissaire à terrier dans le Diocèse de Castres : présentement à Geneve, accusé d'avoir fait mourir sa seconde fille, pour l'empêcher de se faire catholique; & pour ses deux filles, Paris, [s.n.], 1766
- Mémoire a consulter, et Consultation, sur plusieurs questions importantes dans une affaire pendante en l'Amirauté de Rouen. Notamment sur la question si un capitaine-géreur, domicilié à Rouen, a pu se créer, pendant le tems par lui employé aux opérations de sa commission, un domicile en Amérique, au préjudice & en fraude de ses constituans, Rouen, L. Cellot, 1772
- Mémoire et consultation sur le pretendu viol et le prétendu assassinat de la demoiselle Rouge : imputés a six personnes, Paris, L. Cellot, 1770
- Mémoire et réponse a M. L'Abbé de L'Epée pour le sieur Cazeaux, accusé d'avoir supprimé la personne & l'état du Comte de Solar, Paris, Knapen, 1779
- Mémoire pour Dame M. R. Petit de la Burthe, marquise d'Anglure, contre le sieur Pierre Petit; et encore contre le sieur Petit de la Siguenie… , Paris, Simon, 1782
- Mémoire pour le Sieur Desbordes, ecuyer, héritier aux meubles & acquêts & aux propres maternels de feu M. Fugere, conseiller du roy en la Cour des aides, Paris, Ch. Est. Chenault, 1758
- Mémoire pour le sieur Gasteau bourgeois de Paris, tuteur de Jean-Baptiste-Antoine-Pacifique-Joseph Alliot, fils mineur de Jean-Baptiste Alliot, ecuyer & de Dame Marie-Therese Michaux son épouse, demandeur contre le sieur Alliot, ayeul du mineur, fermier général & intendant de la maison de Sa Majesté le roi de Pologne, défendeur, Paris, L. Cellot, 1764
- Mémoire pour le sieur Gaudon contre le sieur Jean Ramponeau, Paris, Louis Cellot, 1760
- Mémoire pour le sieur Regad de Musseau, ancien capitaine au Bataillon de l'Inde, contre la Compagnie des Indes, Paris, [s.n.], 1768
- Observations sur les profits prétendus indûment faits par la société Lemoine des Pins, Martel, & Varin, Paris, L. Cellot, 1763
- Question sur la legitimité du mariage des Protestans françois, celebré hors du royaume, Paris, L. Cellot, 1764
- Voyages anciens, mœurs pittoresques. Un voyageur français en Angleterre en 1764, Paris, Bureaux de la Revue britannique, [n.d.]
- Défense de Claudine Rouge, Paris, 1760, in-4°
- Mémoire au sujet des caves forcées et des vins pillés des chanoines de la Sainte-Chapelle, Paris, 1760, in-4°
