= Robert Blakey (writer) =

English writer and academic (1795–1878)

Mayor of Morpeth
- In office November 1836 – November 1837
- Preceded by: Anthony Charlton
- Succeeded by: Edward Hedley

Personal details
- Born: 18 May 1795 Morpeth, Northumberland, England
- Died: 26 October 1878 (aged 83) London, England

Robert Blakey (18 May 1795 – 26 October 1878) was an English writer and academic and an early Chartist radical and journalist. He is known also for numerous works on angling and field sports. Blakey served as Mayor of Morpeth from 1836 to 1837. His philosophical works received significant attention from royal subscribers, including Prince Albert of Saxe-Coburg and Gotha (to whom History of the Philosophy of Mind was dedicated), Leopold I of Belgium, Louis Philippe I, and Frederick William IV.

== Life ==
The son of a mechanic, Robert Blakey, he was born at Morpeth 18 May 1795. He lost his father when just nine months old, and was taken charge of by his grandmother Elizabeth Laws at age six. From his ninth to his thirteenth year he assisted his uncle in gardening, after which he was apprenticed to the fur trade at Alnwick.

In 1815, Blakey returned to Morpeth, and began to contribute to the Newcastle Magazine, The Black Dwarf, Cobbett's Register, and the Durham Chronicle. In November 1837, already a successful furrier at the time, Blakey was elected Mayor of Morpeth, succeeding Anthony Charlton. The following November, he was succeeded by E.A. Hedley. At the beginning of 1838, he purchased the Northern Liberator, which had been founded by Augustus Hardin Beaumont in September 1837. Through its pages he played a central role in the organisation of Chartist agitation on Tyneside. The content of the Liberator under his control by no means ruled out the use of armed force.

In 1840, the Northern Liberator was amalgamated with The Champion, a London weekly paper, as The Northern Liberator and Champion, and published both at Newcastle and London. For the publication in his paper of an essay on the natural right of resistance to constituted authority, Blakey was prosecuted by the government, and bound over to keep the peace. Shortly afterwards he sold the paper, at a loss, and failing to start in London a paper called The Politician, he went to France, to study philosophy.

Blakey left radical politics permanently from this time. He visited the major libraries of Belgium, and was hired as assistant on a History of Social and Political Philosophy, which was not completed. In 1848, he was appointed professor of logic and metaphysics at Queen's College, Belfast, and in 1860 he received a civil list pension. In recognition of his academic achievements, the University of Jena conferred upon Blakey an honorary PhD. The later years of his life were spent in London, where he died 26 October 1878. A volume of his Memoirs appeared in 1879, edited by Henry Miller.

Blakey's youngest daughter married Northumberland-born businessman and Sunday school founder George Bell and immigrated to New York City.

== Works ==
Blakey's major work was History of the Philosophy of Mind, embracing the opinions of all Writers on Mental Science from the Earliest Times to the Present Day, 4 vols. 1848, an encyclopedic work on European metaphysics. For this achievement, he was personally awarded a gold medal by Leopold I of Belgium. He followed generally the line of the Scottish Enlightenment, and French philosophy as represented by Victor Cousin's Cours. He drew on George Lewes and John Daniel Morell, Joseph Marie, baron de Gérando, Jacob Brucker and Heinrich Ritter. With a chronological method, he succeeded in writing a popular work combining biography and short summaries of philosophical positions. Related books were:

- Treatise on the Divine and Human Wills (1831).
- History of Moral Science (1833, 2 vols.).
- Christian Hermits (1845).
- Historical Sketch of Logic from the Earliest Times to the Present Day, 1851.
- History of Political Literature from the Earliest Times, (1855, 2 vols.).

Other works were:

- A Life of James Beattie the poet, with the Rev. Daniel Paterson.
- Cottage Politics, or Letters on the New Poor Law Bill, 1837.
- Temporal Benefits of Christianity, 1849.
- Old Faces in New Masks 1859.
- A few Remarkable Events in the Life of Rev. Josiah Thompson, as Nathan Oliver, an apocryphal biography slanted against Dissenters.

Books on angling and shooting, his recreations:

- Hints on Angling, with suggestions for angling excursions in France and Belgium, to which are appended some brief notices of the English, Scotch, and Irish waters, 1846, as "Hackle Palmer".
- The Angler's Complete Guide to the Rivers and Lakes of England, 1853, and in 1854 a similar work on Scotland.
- Angling, or How to angle and where to go, 1853.
- Shooting; a Manual of practical Information on this Branch of British Field Sports 1854.
- Historical Sketches of the Angling Literature of all Nations, 1855.
- The Angler's Song Book, 1855.

== Sources ==
This article incorporates text from a publication now in the public domain: Stephen, Leslie, ed. (1886). "Blakey, Robert". Dictionary of National Biography. Vol. 5. London: Smith, Elder & Co.
