= Anne-Louise Élie de Beaumont =

Woman of letters

- Born: 1729; Caen, Province of Normandy, Kingdom of France
- Died: 12 January 1783); Paris

Anne-Louise Élie de Beaumont (1729 – 12 January 1783) was a French writer. She was the author of Letters from the Marquis de Roselle.

== Biography ==
Beaumont was born Anne Louise Morin du Mesnil in Caen in 1729 the daughter of Huguenot Robert de Bérenger. Though she was raised a Catholic on the orders of Louis XV, her father was Protestant. He left France selling the family's estate at Mézidon-Canon. Her husband was Jean-Baptiste-Jacques Élie de Beaumont, a lawyer in the Calas affair and well known defender of religious freedom. They married in 1760. The couple had a son Arnaud 1772. They also regained the family estate through a legal battle. Beaumont wrote several books for publication and they have been translated into a number of languages including English and Dutch. She died in Paris in 1783.

== Bibliography ==
- Letters from the Marquis de Roselle, 1761
- Anecdotes from the Court and the reign of Edward II, King of England, 1776
