= Leonard Beaumont =

British Printmaker and Graphic Designer

Leonard Beaumont British Printmaker and Graphic Designer
- Born: 1891; Broomhall, Sheffield, England
- Died: 1986 (aged 94–95)

Leonard Beaumont (1891–1986) was an English printmaker, graphic designer, illustrator and publisher. He was one of the earliest exponents of the new art of linocut in printmaking in Britain during the early 1930s. He was one of a small group of progressive and highly regarded printmakers who exhibited at the Redfern and Ward Galleries in central London. Whilst working in relative isolation in Yorkshire, most of his contemporaries were linked in some way to the Grosvenor School of Modern Art, located in Pimlico, London.

== Early life and career ==
Beaumont was born and raised in Broomhall, Sheffield. Whilst studying evening classes at The Sheffield Technical School of Art he was employed by The Sheffield Daily Telegraph newspaper to produce black and white advertisements. He was awarded a full-time scholarship, however his artistic career was cut short by the outbreak of World War One, in which he served with the Royal Naval Volunteer Reserves in India and Ceylon (1915–1918). After the war he re-joined the art department of the Sheffield Telegraph. He married Gertrude Roberts in 1921 and shared a joint passion for Russian politics, film and literature.

== Printmaker and book publisher ==
He taught himself how to produce etchings after reading E. S. Lumsden's book 'The Art of Etching' (1925). He travelled extensively throughout mainland Europe and produced his first significant collection of etchings, several of which were shown in London at the Royal Academy's Summer Exhibitions (1929–1933). He designed and built his own printing press which he installed in his home. He was elected a member of several important printmaking societies in London, Glasgow and Edinburgh. His etchings were highly praised by the two preeminent critics of the day, Malcolm Charles Salaman and Campbell Dodgson.

His etchings were essentially topographical views, reinterpretations of sketches produced whilst on holiday in Continental Europe. However it is his work as a linocut printmaker where his reputation now rests. Inspired by Claude Flight he produced most of his distinctive linocuts over a four-year period (1930–1934). His most notable works were exhibited throughout Great Britain and subsequently North America. As a result, his prints were acquired by several notable public art collections, including The British Museum, London, Scottish National Gallery of Modern Art, Edinburgh, The National Gallery of Canada and Auckland Art Gallery, New Zealand.

He published three books under his own imprint, Eismeer Press; ‘The Art of Linoleum’ (1932) and 'Rhymes & Rhythms for Young People' (1933). Both publications are rare examples produced during the inter-war years which incorporate original linocuts. His next publication ‘To Daffadills’ (1934) incorporated a delicate wood engraving around Robert Herrick’s 17th century ode to the brevity of spring. The success of these publications led to several commissions for book illustrations and began a lifelong association with Sir Francis Meynell, the founder of Nonsuch Press. He also designed a series of ground-breaking brochures and advertisements for the steel and engineering firm, Edgar Allen & Co in 1935/36.

== The Sheffield Print Club ==
Beaumont co-founded the Sheffield Print Club, with fellow Sheffield artists, Stanley Royle and Henry G. Hoyland in 1930. He produced the annual editioned print for 1932, a topographical view of a Swiss mountain chalet entitled ‘The Club Hut’, a copy of which is held in the British Museum.

== Graphic designer and corporate branding ==
In 1936 he moved to London and became Art Director in the Publicity Department of United Artists Film Distributors. Two years later he was appointed Head of the Design Unit at the London advertising agency, Crowther & Mather. Following the onset of World War II, he worked on war propaganda for the British Government, including print and publicity for the Ministry of Information, the Ministry of Food and several award-winning campaigns for the General Post Office.

He was elected a member of the Society of Industrial Artists (London) in 1942. His poster work 'Ideals and Aspirations of the U.N.' received 'an honourable mention' in the 1947 U.N. Poster Competition, an open-submission to all professional artists and designers from around the world. He was elected a Fellow of the Society of Industrial Artists (FSIA) in 1947. He was one of fourteen shortlisted designers to submit proposals for commemorative British stamps for the 1948 London Olympic Games.

He was appointed the first design consultant for the supermarket giant, Sainsbury's in 1950. He revolutionised the company's approach to design, packaging and corporate branding. He also undertook a wide variety of freelance design work, including the front cover artwork for the 'Illustrated Review of British Goods' for the 1951 Festival of Britain.

== Re-evaluation of his printwork ==
He retired from Sainsbury's in 1964 and took up black and white photography. An exhibition of his linocuts was held at the Crest Gallery, London (1982) and a major retrospective exhibition, 'Leonard Beaumont : Artist-Designer' was held at the Graves Art Gallery in Sheffield (1983). An exhibition mounted after he bequeathed his own collection of over 80 prints and original artwork to Sheffield City Art Galleries (now Museums Sheffield). He died aged 95 in Hathersage, Derbyshire in 1986.

Beaumont’s linocuts enjoyed a renewed appreciation, and with this resurgence of interest Museums Sheffield organised ‘The Power of The Print: Leonard Beaumont Rediscovered’, at the Graves Art Gallery, Sheffield in 2013 (curated by Sian Brown). To coincide with this exhibition a monograph 'Leonard Beaumont – A Biography & Print Catalogue Raisonné' was published.

Several of Beaumont's most innovative linocuts were included in a major exhibition of British printmaking held at the Dulwich Picture Gallery, London (Spring-Summer 2019).
