= Henry Harcourt (Jesuit) =

English Jesuit (1612–1673)

Henry Harcourt (1612 – 11 May 1673) was an English Jesuit.

== Biography ==
Harcourt whose real name was Beaumont, third son of Sir Henry Beaumont, knt., of Stoughton, Leicestershire, by Elizabeth, daughter of Sir William Turpen, knight, of Knoptoft in that county, was born in 1612. He entered the Society of Jesus in 1630, and was made a spiritual coadjutor on 24 May 1643. In 1649 he appears in the Lancashire district, in 1655 in the Hampshire district, and in 1672 in the Suffolk district, where he died on 11 May 1673.

He was the author of "England's Old Religion faithfully gathered out of the Church of England. As it was written by Ven. Bede almost a Thousand Years agoe (that is) in the year 698 after the Passion of our Saviour. By H. B.," Antwerp, 1650, 12mo; and again, Antwerp (or London), 1658, 12mo.
