= Mary Beaumont (author) =

English author (1849–1910)

- Born: Rosalina Mellor; 14 April 1849; Halifax, Yorkshire, England
- Died: 25 December 1910 (aged 61); Hampstead, London, England

Rosalina Mellor Oakes (14 April 1849 – 25 December 1910), known by the pen name Mary Beaumont, was an English author.

== Life ==
Beaumont was from Halifax in Yorkshire, England. Her father, Enoch Mellor, was a clergyman. Enoch and his wife, Caroline, raised their daughter in a family atmosphere that has been described as "a combination of piety and intellectual discovery." In 1874, Beaumont married the manufacturer John Oakes; they had two daughters. Beaumont was lifelong friends with Robert Forman Horton (1855–1934), a leading nonconformist minister. Beaumont and her husband lived with Horton from 1902 until Beaumont's death in 1910.

Beaumont had begun writing at a young age, publishing some poetry in magazines by the time she was nineteen. However, ill health interfered with her writing, and she was not able to pursue authorship in earnest until the 1890s.

In his Autobiography, published in 1917, Robert Forman Horton confessed to having been in love with Oakes, who he referred to as 'my friend' throughout the book. Horton and Beaumont wrote poetry to each other, some of which was published under the title 'Poems by two friends'.

== Works ==
Beaumont's first published works appeared in the Christian-themed Sunday Magazine, edited by Thomas Guthrie. One of her later works, The Valley of Stars, was published as a serial. In addition to publishing her work in periodicals, Beaumont published at least three volumes: A Ringby Lass and Other Stories (1895), the novel Joan Seaton (1896), and Two New Women and Other Stories (1899). In addition to painting a vivid picture of her native Yorkshire, many of her works show Victorian attitudes towards social issues like colonialism and women's emancipation.

=== A Ringby Lass and Other Stories (1895) ===
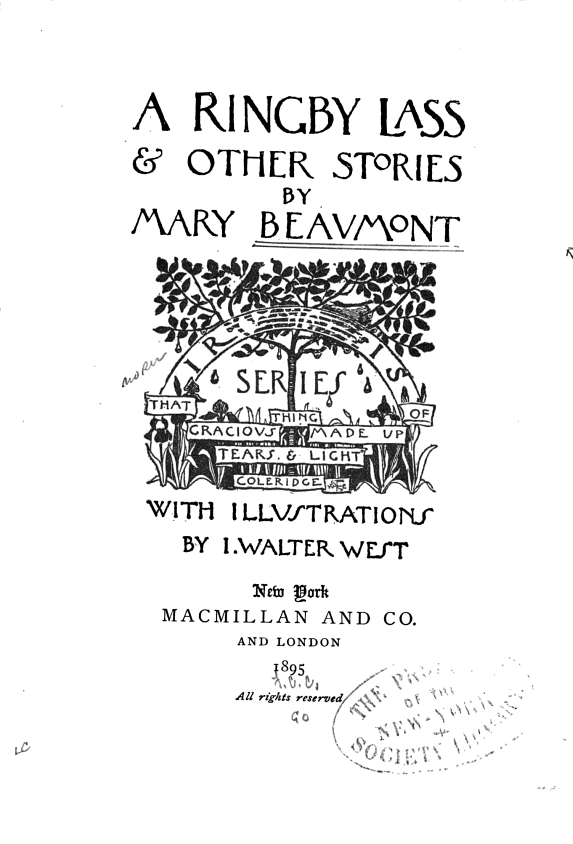
Title page of A Ringby Lass (USA edition)

This collection includes five short stories: "A Ringby Lass," "Jack," "The White Christ," "Miss Penelope's Tale," and "The Revenge of Her Race." The title story, "A Ringby Lass," is set in Beaumont's native Yorkshire, as is the story "Jack." Macmillan issued this story collection as the fifth installment in its "Iris Series." As such, it was nicely bound, with illustrations by I. Walter West. The book's attractive physical format was part of its appeal, with the New York Times noting its "charming" format and "delicate illustrations."

Based on its publication history, "The Revenge of Her Race" seems to be the most widely-read story in this volume. It was popular enough that it was reprinted in Stories by English Authors: The Orient, a 1902 collection that also included Rudyard Kipling's "The Man Who Would Be King." More recently, the story appeared in the 2004 Broadview Anthology of Victorian Short Stories.

"The Revenge of Her Race" is set in colonial New Zealand and tells the tale of a beautiful Maori woman named Maritana who marries an Englishman. The story depicts Maritana as a tragic character who is caught between two cultures and dies young. Although the narrator shows Maritana in a sympathetic light, the story and its critical reception demonstrate the influence of scientific racism in the 1890s. One of Beamont's English characters states that Maritana's inability to become completely Anglicized is due to "something" in her "very blood." In response, the New York Times commented, "There is an exceeding truthfulness in 'The Revenge of Race.' We have all heard of the Zulu lad taken from savagery . . . who, on his return to Africa . . . resumed the ways of his wild kindred. It is a case of atavism."

=== Joan Seaton (1896) ===
Like the title story in A Ringby Lass, Joan Seaton is set in Yorkshire, specifically in a fictional village called Percival-Dion (or Parsifal-Dion). It follows the interactions of several local families who have known each other for multiple generations. According to Beaumont's friend Robert Horton, the village of Parsifal-Dion is based on the real village of Thornton Rust in Wensleydale.

Contemporary reviewers praised the book for its depiction of character and the romantic Yorkshire setting. Her recurring use of the Yorkshire setting for her fiction led to the perception that Beaumont's work participated in the larger movement of British regional literature. One reviewer wrote that "In Joan Seaton and in some of her shorter tales she succeeds in doing for parts of Yorkshire what Mr. J.M. Barrie and Ian Maclaren have done for Scotland."

In 1912, Joan Seaton was issued as part of the Everyman's Library series.

=== Two New Women and Other Stories (1899) ===
This collection contains ten stories: "Two New Women," "The Avenger," "An Askedale Woman," "Alison," "The Heart of Dandy Fane," "Ould Weather-Glass," "The Lovers of Avino," "His Wife's Hand," "An Old Score," and "His Enemy." Reviewers praised Beaumont's emphasis on compassion and morality.

The title story, "Two New Women," is by far the longest. The title alludes to Victorian debates over women's emancipation and the concept of the New Woman. The story is set in Italy, where an English engineer named Edward Molyneux meets two young women named Daphne Musgrave and Betty Chorley. He also meets Daphne's relative, the aristocratic Sir Reginald Musgrave. The two women plan to pursue independent careers, Daphne as a landscape gardener and Betty as a doctor. Speaking to Edward, Daphne expresses her opinion that marriage is not necessary for a happy life, and she suggests that she will start a family by adopting a child. In a parallel conversation with Sir Reginald, Betty states that idle aristocrats who do not work for a living are parasitical. However, once Sir Reginald proves that he is not content to pursue a life of idleness, Betty accepts his proposal of marriage. Daphne refuses a marriage proposal from Edward, but he decides to remain her friend in the hope that she will eventually change her mind.
