= B. Beaumont =

English merchant, writer

Betty Beaumont
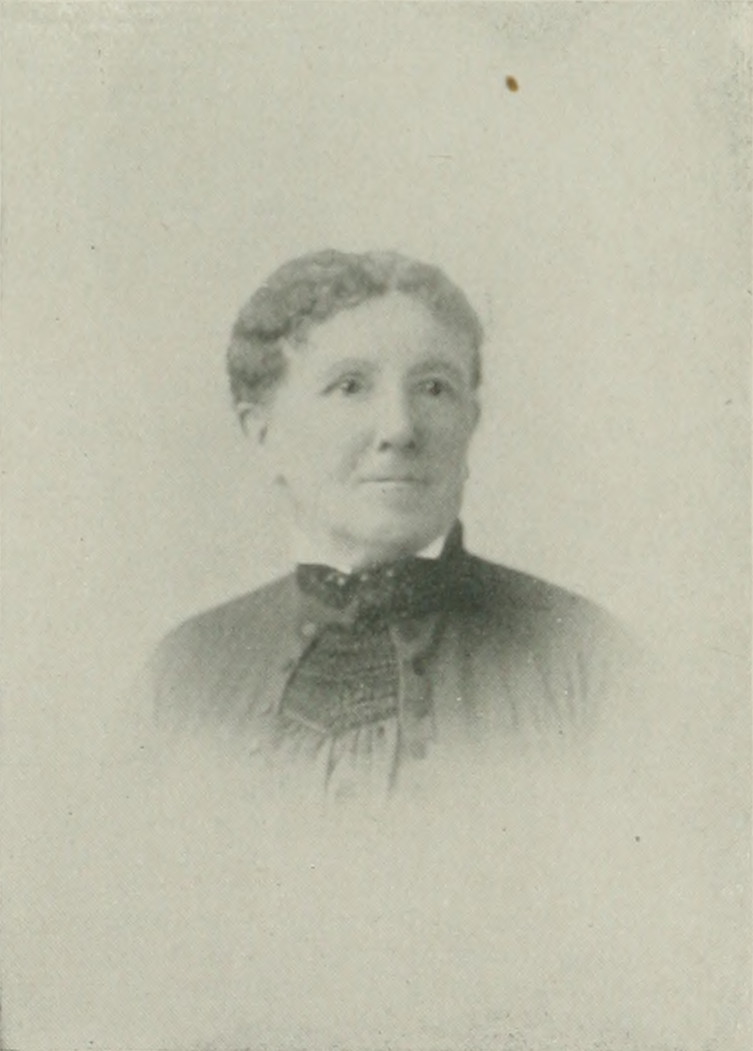
- Photo in A Woman of the Century
- Born: Betty Bentley; 9 August 1828; Lancastershire, England
- Died: 6 September 1892 (aged 64); England
- Occupations: author, merchant
- Spouse: Edward Beaumont
- Writing career
- Notable works: Twelve Years of My Life; A Business Woman's Journal

B. Beaumont (née, Bentley; 9 August 1828 – 6 September 1892) was a 19th-century British author, merchant, cotton factor and hotel owner. After immigrating to the U.S., she became a successful merchant of Woodville, Mississippi. Beaumont was the author of the autobiography, Twelve Years of My Life, and A Business Woman's Journal, which documented part of her career. She returned to England before her death there in 1892.

== Early life and education ==
Betty Bentley was born in Lancastershire, England, 9 August 1828. She was the only child of Joseph Bentley, the educational reformer of England. The father organized and conducted a society for "the promotion of the education of the people," and wrote and published 33 books to improve the methods of education, but he allowed his daughter to acquire little formal education, taking her from school at age 10, and employing her in his business to copy his manuscripts, correct proof and attend lectures. He also showed her a sum of the expenses she had been to him in the 10 years of her life. It seemed a large amount, and so as to be any further expense, she learned the milliner's trade. Her propensity for learning was exceptional, but her opportunity for study was limited.

== Career ==
She married Edward Beaumont and they emigrated seven years later. They lived in Philadelphia, Pennsylvania for five years and, on because of Edward's health they moved to Woodville, Mississippi in 1854, after her husband was hired to work as a machinist of the railroad. The failing health of her husband and the needs of seven children prompted her to find work, and she opened a general store in 1855. She exchanged cotton, sheep and other products for supplies, and she resold the goods from her store. She also hired young women to work as army hat milliners at her factory.

The start of the American Civil War, six year later, and the state of feeling in a southern town toward suspected abolitionists were described in Beaumont's Twelve Years of My Life (T. B. Peterson and Brothers. Philadelphia, 1887), a two volume autobiography of her life covering the period of 1854 through 1866. This is a story of twelve years passed by a Northern woman in Woodville, writing in a chatty style, and with frankness that carries conviction. From the beginning of her years in the south with husband and children, she had to battle with the Southern prejudice against a Yankee. Her narrative was graphic in its varied experience of keeping store, raising fruits and vegetables, and being suspected of being an abolitionist. Incidents of Yellow fever were also well-described. Few women in that time wrote about the Ku Klux Klan but Beaumont stated, "... [it] was probably organized for the sake of enforcing law and order during this period of anarchy, but, having been joined by many reckless characters, it in turn has grown into a perfect scourge."

Her varied experiences during a period of historical interest are given in A Business Woman's Journal (T. B. Peterson and Brothers, Philadelphia, 1888), covering the period of her life from 1866 through 1876. That book graphically explains the financial state of the cotton-growing region of the South during the years immediately succeeding the Civil War, the confusion consequent upon the transition from the credit system to a cash basis, and the condition of the suddenly-freed Afro-Americans. Beaumont's books were valuable because they documented a period that quickly passed. Her style was simple and unpretending. She was one of the hard-working business women of the day who demonstrated independence, self-sacrifice, and tenacity.

== Death ==
She died in England, 6 September 1892 and was buried there. A memorial marker in her honor is located at Evergreen Cemetery in Woodville, Mississippi.

== Selected works ==
- 1887, Twelve years of my life : an autobiography
- 1888, A business woman's journal : a sequel to "Twelve years of my life."
