= William Rawlins Beaumont =

Canadian surgeon (1803–1875)

William Rawlins Beaumont (1803 – October 12, 1875) was a surgeon who was educated at London's St Bartholomew's Hospital where he studied under the distinguished surgeon, John Abernethy.

While at St Barts, which was a modern medical school, Beaumont was a student with James Paget. He also studied in Europe and returned to England to practice. Failing to receive a commission in the Army Medical Service, he came to Toronto in 1841 as an already a highly trained surgeon. He became professor of surgery at King's College in 1843, attending physician and surgeon to the Toronto General Hospital and its consulting physician and surgeon when Christopher Widmer died in 1858.
