= Robert Beaumont (essayist) =

Robert Beaumont (fl. 1639), essayist, is chiefly remarkable for his Missives, which appear, from one part of Beaumont's epistle to the reader, to be his own composition, and from another part to be the composition of others. But the former intimation has the stronger support. "Letters", he says, "should be like a well-furnished table, where every guest may eat of what dish he pleases." This reminds us of Bickerstaff's once-popular opera, Love in a Village

"The world is a well-furnished table,
Where guests are promiscuously set."

There are fifteen essays on the various parts of the body–the head, eye, nose, ear, tongue, and so forth. They are full of trope and figure, frequently with much force of application, quaint and sententious.

The precise title of his work is as follows: Love's Missives to Virtue; with Essaies, London printed by William Godbid, and are to be sold at the signe of the Star, in Little Britain, 1660. Small octavo, pages 120. (Note: Watt's Bibl. British) (Note: Lowndes's Bibliog. Man. i. 138) (Note: Sir E. Brydges' Restituta, 3, 278–81.)
