= Ernest Laurent =

French painter and printmaker (1859–1929)

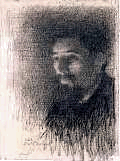
Georges Seurat by Ernest Laurent (ca. 1880)

Ernest Joseph Laurent (June 8, 1859 – June 25, 1929) was a French painter and printmaker. He was born in Gentilly and died in Bièvres, Essonne.

Laurent was a neo-impressionist artist whose main influences were his instructor Ernest Hébert and his friend Georges Seurat. Laurent took second prize in the Prix de Rome in 1889 and in 1890, Laurent arrived in Rome, where Hébert remained Director of the Académie de France. From Rome, he went to Assisi where he underwent a mystical experience. It would profoundly influence his art. The work he returned to Paris from Assisi was noted for its religious themes.

Over time, profound religious devotion influenced his artistic motif and religious symbolism and scenery crept into his work. This aspect of his life ran counter to Seurat's materialism and the two parted ways.

Laurent is buried in Père Lachaise Cemetery.

== See also ==
- Hôtel Terminus
