= William Boxall =

British artist

Sir William Boxall RA
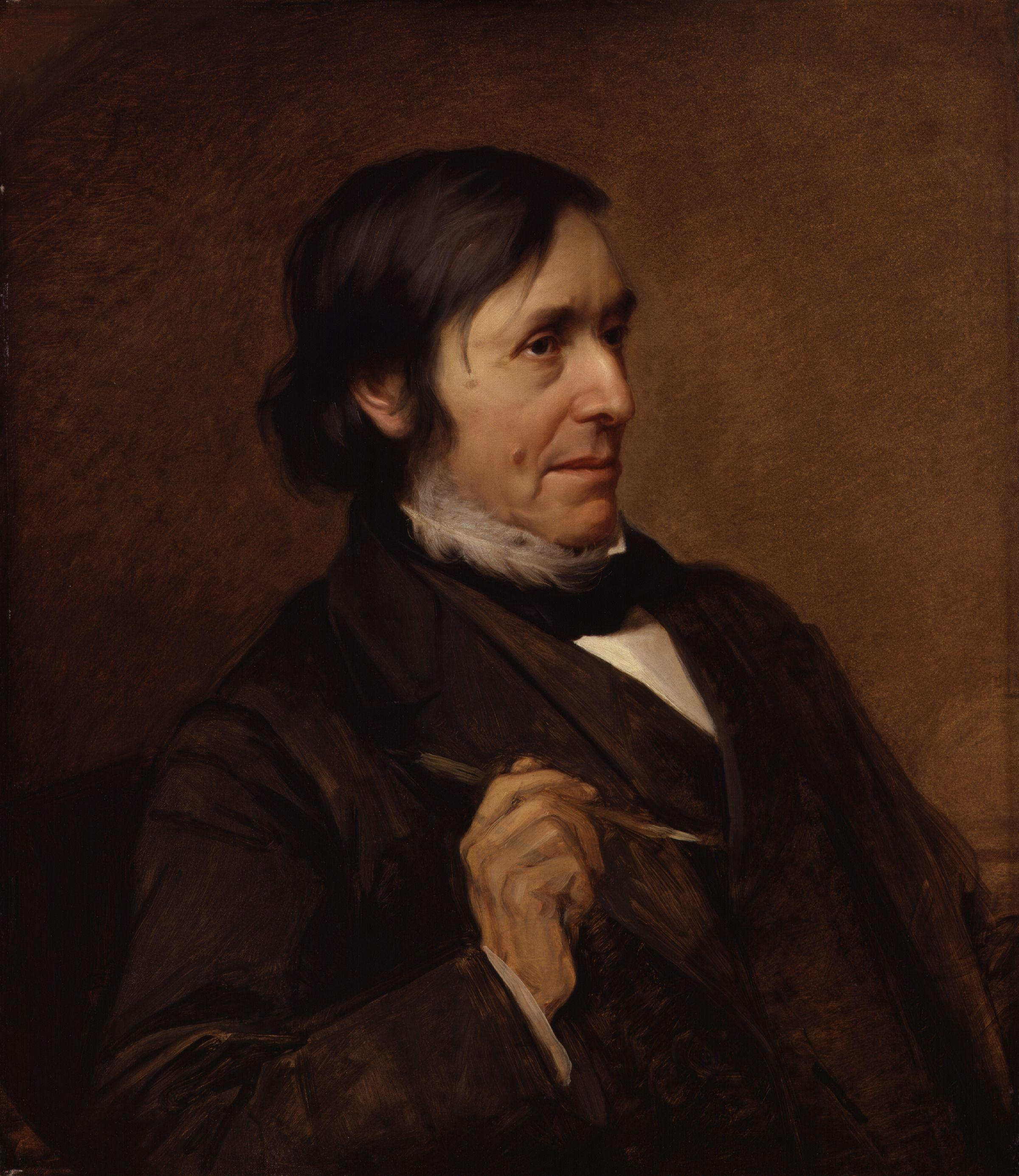
- Portrait of William Boxall by Michelangelo Pittatore, 1870
- Born: 29 June 1800; Oxford, England
- Died: 6 December 1879 (aged 79); London, England

Sir William Boxall RA (29 June 1800 – 6 December 1879) was an English painter and museum director.

== Early life and education ==
He was born at Oxford on 29 June 1800, and baptised 29 July at St Michael's Church, to Thomas Boxall (d. 1847) and his wife Diana (nee Perrett, d.1841). He had an older sister Anne (1794–1846) and a younger sister Emma (1807–1850). He was educated at John Roysse's Free School in Abingdon-on-Thames (now Abingdon School), before entering the Royal Academy Schools in 1819.

== Career ==
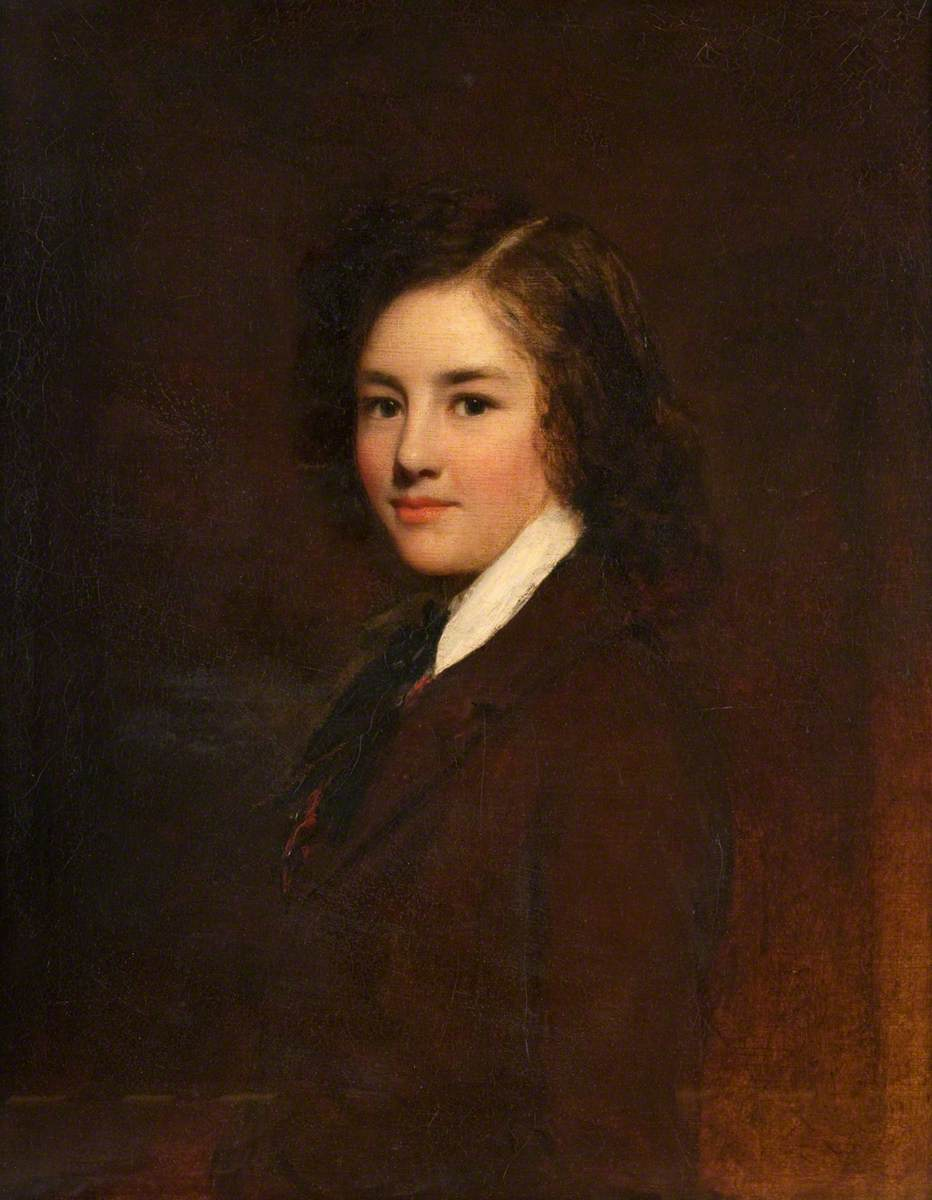
Portrait of James McNeill Whistler, 1848

Between 1827 and 1845 he made a number of trips to Italy to study the old masters. Initially hoping to make his name as a history painter, Boxall later had to turn to the more lucrative genre of portraiture. Among his friends were William Wordsworth, whose portrait he painted, the sculptor John Gibson and the painter Sir Edwin Landseer. He was the executor of the will of Sir Charles Lock Eastlake, his predecessor as Director of the National Gallery.

Following his appointment in February 1866, as the director of the National Gallery, Boxall practically gave up painting. His directorship lasted eight years, during which he oversaw the construction of Edward Middleton Barry's celebrated eastern extension. In 1869, Boxall negotiated the purchase of Sir Robert Peel's collection of Flemish and Dutch paintings for £7,500. With this purchase the Dutch Golden Age became one of the strengths in the Gallery's holdings. Both of the Gallery's paintings by Michelangelo were bought by Boxall, The Entombment in 1868 and the Manchester Madonna in 1870. The authenticity of the former was called into question by the House of Lords in 1869, but is now generally regarded to be genuine – unlike another of Boxall's controversial acquisitions, the "Suermondt Rembrandt" 7, now attributed to Nicolaes Maes.

He was elected an Associate of the Royal Academy (ARA) in 1851 and a full Royal Academician (RA) in 1863. He was knighted in 1867.

== See also ==
- List of Old Abingdonians

== Sources ==
- Avery-Quash, Susanna, "Boxall, William (1800–1879)." Oxford Dictionary of National Biography. Ed. H. C. G. Matthew and Brian Harrison. Oxford: OUP, 2004.
