= Cottolengo =

Cottolengo may refer to:

- Agostino Cottolengo (1794–1853), Italian painter
- Giuseppe Benedetto Cottolengo (1786–1842), Italian Roman Catholic saint
  - Little House of Divine Providence, often known metonymically as Cottolengo, the charity institute which he founded
  - Society of Priests of Saint Joseph Benedict Cottolengo, the society of apostolic life which he founded
  - Brothers of Saint Joseph Benedict Cottolengo, a male religious congregation
  - Sisters of Saint Joseph Benedict Cottolengo, a female religious congregation

== See also ==
- San Giuseppe Benedetto Cottolengo, Grosseto, a Roman Catholic church in Grosseto, Tuscany, Italy
- Gottolengo, a municipality in the province of Brescia, Lombardy, Italy
