= Friends of the Uffizi Gallery =

- Established: 2006
- Type: Not-for-profit organization supporting conservation and preservation projects at the Uffizi Gallery
- Region served: United States of America
- Website: www.friendsoftheuffizigallery.org

The Friends of the Uffizi Gallery was established in 2006 in Palm Beach, Florida as the United States "sister" organization to the Amici degli Uffizi in Florence, Italy, which was founded by a group of concerned people in response to the terrorist bombing of the Uffizi Gallery in May 1993 that damaged several artworks and portions of the museum. The Friends of the Uffizi Gallery and the Amici degli Uffizi directly support the Uffizi Gallery by helping build awareness of the museum and its cultural heritage and by raising funds for acquisitions, preservation, restorations, temporary exhibitions, and educational programming.

== History ==
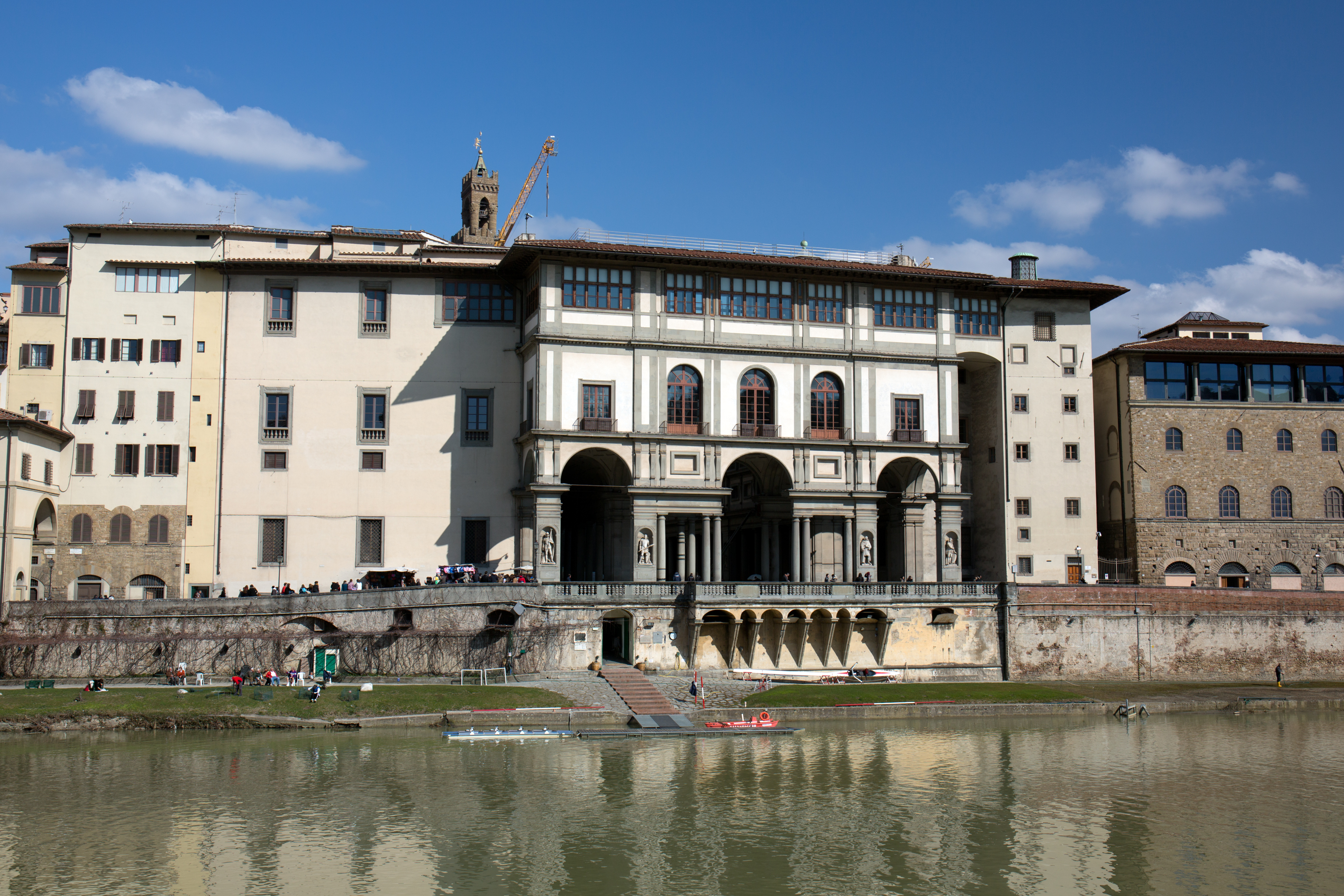
Uffizi Gallery viewed from the south

In 1993 a terrorist bomb severely damaged the Uffizi Gallery and some of the artworks. In response to this attack, a group of concerned citizens founded the Amici degli Uffizi in Florence to help restore and preserve the artistic heritage of the museum. Since the bombing, the Amici degli Uffizi has supported the Uffizi Gallery by facilitating acquisitions, supporting restorations, and organizing special temporary exhibitions.

In 2006, the Friends of the Uffizi Gallery, Inc. was established in Palm Beach, Florida as the United States “sister” organization to the Amici degli Uffizi. Granted 501(c)(3) Tax Exempt Status, its sole purpose is to support the activities of the Amici by helping to fund ongoing restoration projects and to bring these projects to fruition.

Led by Executive Board President Contessa Maria Vittoria Colonna Rimbotti, the Friends of the Uffizi Gallery in conjunction with the Amici degli Uffizi raises funds to support all of these activities through an international group of members and patrons. More than 30 restoration projects designated as priorities by the museum have been completed over the last several years and include renowned paintings, altarpieces, sculptures and tapestries.

== Mission ==
The mission of both organizations is to support the Uffizi Gallery of Florence, Italy, by raising awareness of the museum and its collections and by providing resources for acquisition, preservation, restoration and education.

The mission of the Friends of the Uffizi Gallery is to support the Amici degli Uffizi in raising funds and resources for the acquisition, restoration, preservation and maintenance of the Uffizi Gallery's cultural heritage as prioritized by its director, Antonio Natali.

=== Friends of the Uffizi Gallery Symbol ===
Created by Sergio Bianco, the symbol represents the view of the Uffizi from the Arno arcade. The sky seen under the archway forms the shape of a horse head in the typical posture of the knight chess piece. Representing loyalty and the right cause, the horse symbolizes the commitment of the Associations Amici degli Uffizi and Friends of the Uffizi Gallery to the benefit of the Uffizi Gallery.

== Activities and special events ==
=== Florentine weekend, Florence Italy ===
Every two years, the Friends of the Uffizi Gallery organize the Florentine Weekend, which includes art-focused activities at the Uffizi Gallery and in nearby locations throughout the City of Florence that relate to both Renaissance art and Italian culture. It is a members-only event open to Friends of the Uffizi Gallery members at the Botticelli, Michelangelo and Leonardo membership levels.

== Completed restoration projects ==
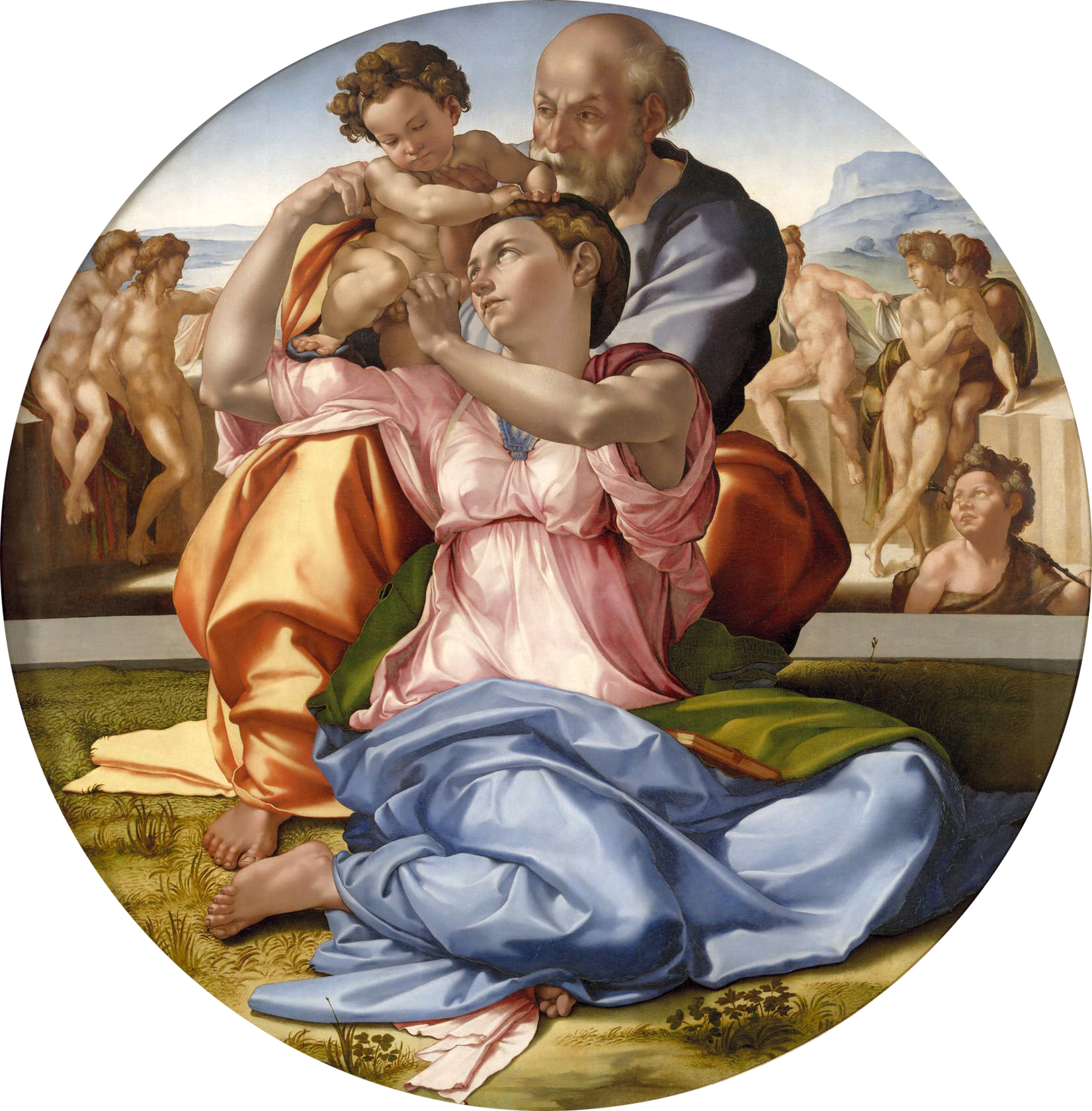
Michelangelo's Tondo Doni is the centerpiece of the new room reconstructed through funds from the Friends of Uffizi Gallery

More than thirty restorations designated as a priority by the Uffizi Gallery have been completed with funds raised by both Friends of the Uffizi Gallery and Amici degli Uffizi.

The Michelangelo Room, which opened to the public on January 29, 2013, is an example of a completed project by this organization. The Friends of the Uffizi Gallery and the Amici degli Uffizi funded the re-construction of this room on the second floor and the re-installation of the paintings. The re-construction involved restoring the original marble floor and re-plastering the walls and painting them red. The re-installation included Michelangelo's Tondo Doni (ca. 1507 oil and tempera on panel) which is the only confirmed panel painting existing today in its original frame. Other early sixteenth-century Florentine painters represented in the room include Francesco Granacci, Fra Bartolomeo (Paolo di Jacopo del Fattorino detto Baccio della Porta), Andrea del Sarto, Franciabigio, Giuliano Bugiardini, and Alonso Berruguete.

Laocoön by Baccio Bandinelli (Firenze 1493–1560), depicts the Trojan priest Laocoön and his two sons ensnared in the toils of the sea serpents sent by Poseidon. A previous restoration was done when the sculpture was broken into more than 40 pieces by a fire that caused a partial roof collapse at the Uffizi on August 12, 1762. The new restoration improved on the previous one plus removed layers of dust and wax that had built up over the decades and caused the sculpture's surface to become dull and darkened. This restoration will protect the beauty and condition of this sculpture for many generations.

== Individual restoration projects ==
These two projects are examples of restorations funded by a single Leonardo-level member of the Friends of the Uffizi Gallery.

The restoration of this late 2nd-century A.D. replica of a 5th-century B.C. Greek sculpture of Asclepius, the god of medicine, made it possible to confirm the pertinence of the head to the body. In addition to strengthening the sculpture by replacing old putty, recent cleaning of the surface revealed details from an early 12th century restoration such as the figure's left hand holding a medicinal plant well known since the Middle Ages. This restoration was funded by the Lisa Marie Conte Browne Family.

This mid-2nd century A.D. statue of Aphrodite & Eros is a replica of the original Capitoline Venus, apart from the addition of the small funerary Eros. The sculpture's head, arms and right leg were integrated in 1584. The sculpture is likely to have never been restored since then and the recent restoration included removing the dirt deposits and addressing the ancient integrations and fractures repairs. This restoration was funded by Thomas J. and Judith A. Embrescia.

== Community restoration projects ==
With this type of project, the Friends of the Uffizi Gallery accepts donations from all sources (including non-members) interested in conserving a selected work of art.

The 2014 project is a statue of Aphrodite (2nd century AD). She is the Greek goddess of love, known as Venus to the Romans. This sculpture is a standing semi-nude female figure created using the ancient Roman fragments of the torso and head. The arms aned richly-draped lower part were added by Alessandro Algardi, an artist hired by the Medici in the 17th century to integrate the fragments into a single sculpture. This restoration project involved removing thick layers of accumulated dust and greatly increased documentary information.

=== Gallery of restoration projects ===
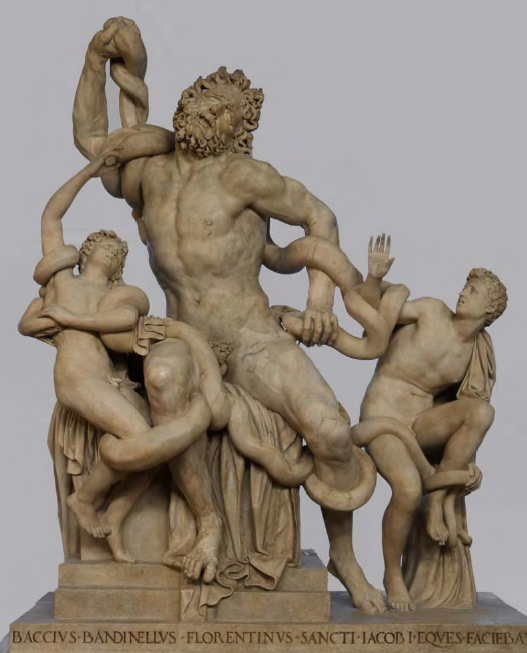
Laocoön. By Baccio Bandinelli, 1520. Restoration completed.

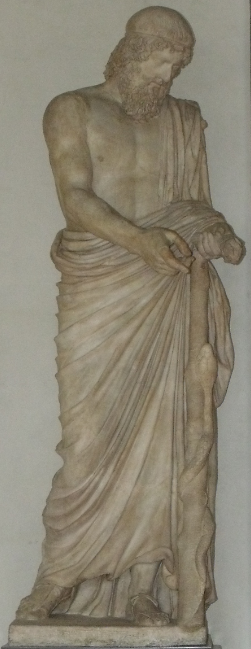
Asclepius 2nd century B.C. 2010 Leonardo Project. Restoration completed.

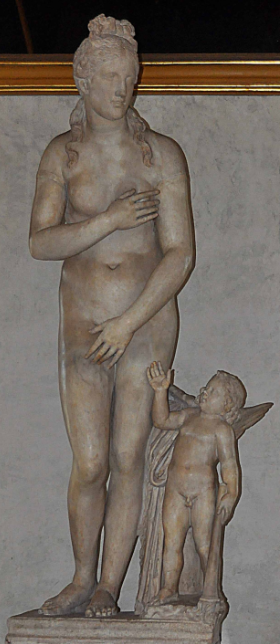
Aphrodite & Eros Mid-2nd century A.D. 2012 Leonardo Project. Restoration completed.

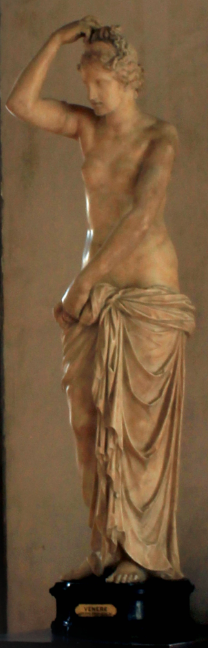
Aphrodite 2nd century A.D. 2014 Community Restoration Project. Restoration completed.
