= Doni Tondo =

Painting by Michelangelo

Doni Tondo (Doni Madonna)
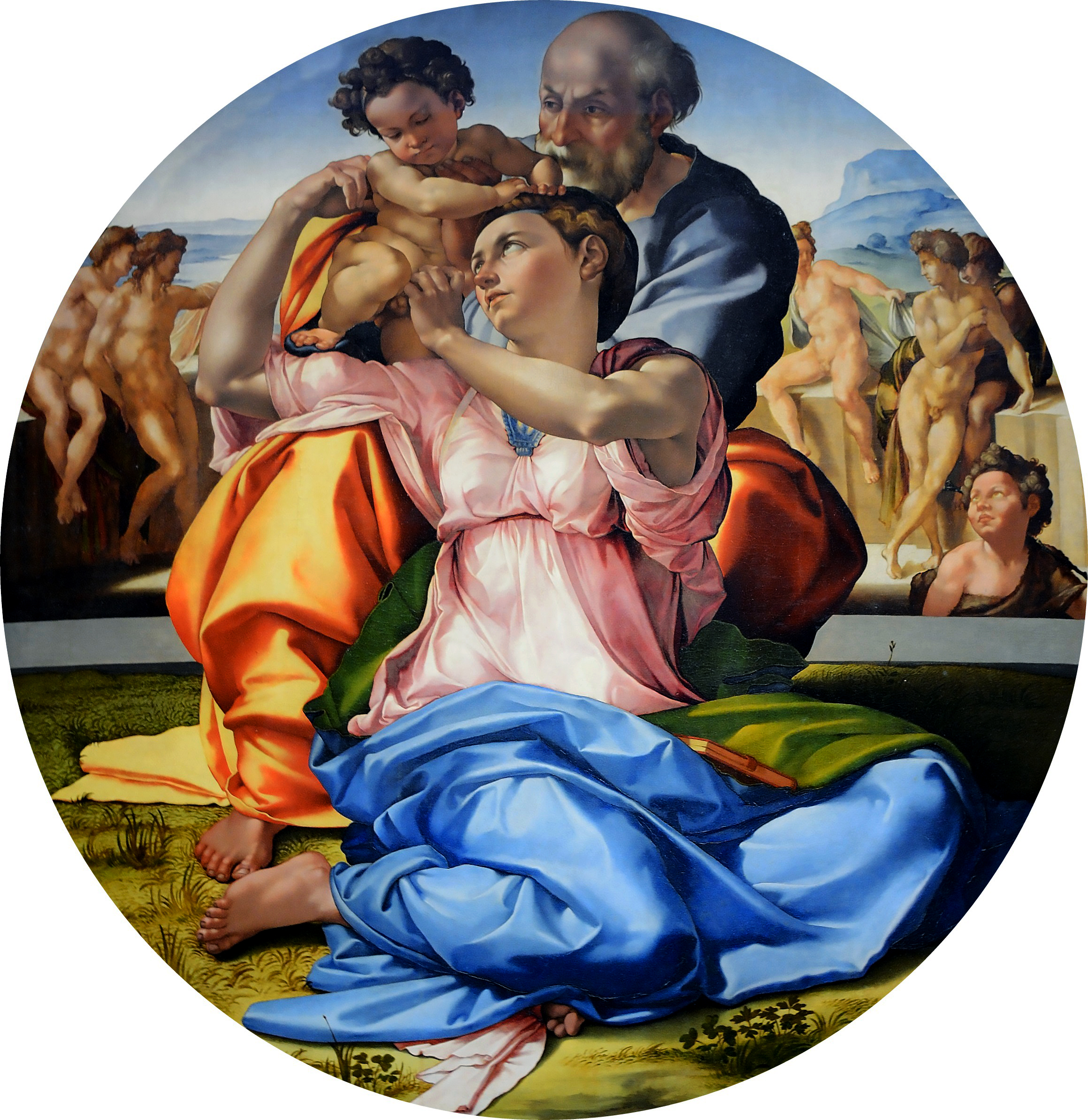
- Artist: Michelangelo
- Year: c. 1507
- Type: Oil and tempera on panel
- Dimensions: 120 cm diameter (47 1/2 in)
- Location: Uffizi; Florence
- Preceded by: The Entombment (Michelangelo)
- Followed by: Battle of Cascina (Michelangelo)

The Doni Tondo or Doni Madonna is the only finished panel painting by the mature Michelangelo to survive. (Note: Two other panel paintings, generally agreed to be by Michelangelo but unfinished – The Entombment and the so-called Manchester Madonna – are both in the National Gallery in London.) Now in the Uffizi in Florence, Italy, and still in its original frame, the Doni Tondo commissioned by Agnolo Doni, probably to commemorate his marriage to Maddalena Strozzi, the daughter of a powerful Tuscan family. The painting is in the form of a tondo, meaning in Italian 'round', a shape which is frequently associated during the Renaissance with domestic ideas.

The Doni Tondo portrays the Holy Family (the child Jesus, Mary, and Joseph) in the foreground, along with John the Baptist in the middle-ground, and contains five nude male figures in the background. The inclusion of these nude figures has been interpreted in a variety of ways.

== History ==
Giorgio Vasari tells us that the work was commissioned by Agnolo Doni (portrait). The occasion may have been to celebrate his marriage in January 1504 to Maddelena Strozzi (portrait); the blazon of the Strozzi family with three crescent moons is carved in the frame.

Alternatively, it could have been commissioned to commemorate the birth of his daughter Maria in 1507. This last theory is supported by the noticeable influence that the Laocoon was unearthed in January 1506 in the presence of Michelangelo, and the similarities between the Doni Virgin and the Sibyls in the Sistine Chapel frescoes, painted the following year.

In either case, Michelangelo completed it before started work in his frescoes in the Sistine Chapel ceiling, in 1508.

== Description ==
Mary is the most prominent figure in the composition, taking up much of the center of the image. She sits directly on the ground without a cushion between herself and the grass, to better communicate the theme of her relationship to the earth (?). Joseph is positioned higher in the image than Mary, although this is an unusual feature in compositions of the Holy Family. Mary is seated between his legs, as if he is protecting her, his great legs forming a kind of de facto throne. There is some debate as to whether Mary is receiving the Child from Joseph or vice versa. Saint John the Baptist, the patron saint of Florence, is very commonly included in Florentine works depicting the Madonna and Child. He is in the middle-ground of the painting, between the Holy Family and the background. The scene appears to be a rural one, with the Holy Family enjoying themselves on the grass and separated from the curiously (seemingly) unrelated group at the back by a low wall.

The painting is still in its original frame, one that Michelangelo might have influenced or helped design. The frame is ornately carved and rather unusual for the five heads it contains which protrude three-dimensionally into space. Similar to the nudes of the background, the meanings of these heads has been the subject of speculation. The frame also contains carvings of crescent moons, stars, vegetation, and lions' heads. These symbols are, perhaps, references to the Doni and Strozzi families, taken from each one's coat of arms. As depicted on the frame, "the moons are bound together with ribbons that interlock with the lions", possibly referring to the marriage of the two families.

There is a horizontal band, possibly a wall, separating the foreground and background. The background figures are five nudes, whose meaning and function are subject to much speculation and debate. Because they are much closer to us, the viewers, the Holy Family is much larger than the nudes in the background, a device to aid the illusion of deep space in a two-dimensional image. Behind Saint John the Baptist is a semi-circular ridge, against which the Sistine ignudi are leaning, or upon which they are sitting. This semi-circle reflects or mirrors the circular shape of the painting itself and acts as a foil to the vertical nature of the principal group (the Holy family). Mary and Joseph gaze at Christ, but none of the background nudes looks directly at him. The far background contains a mountainous landscape rendered in atmospheric perspective.

== Technique ==
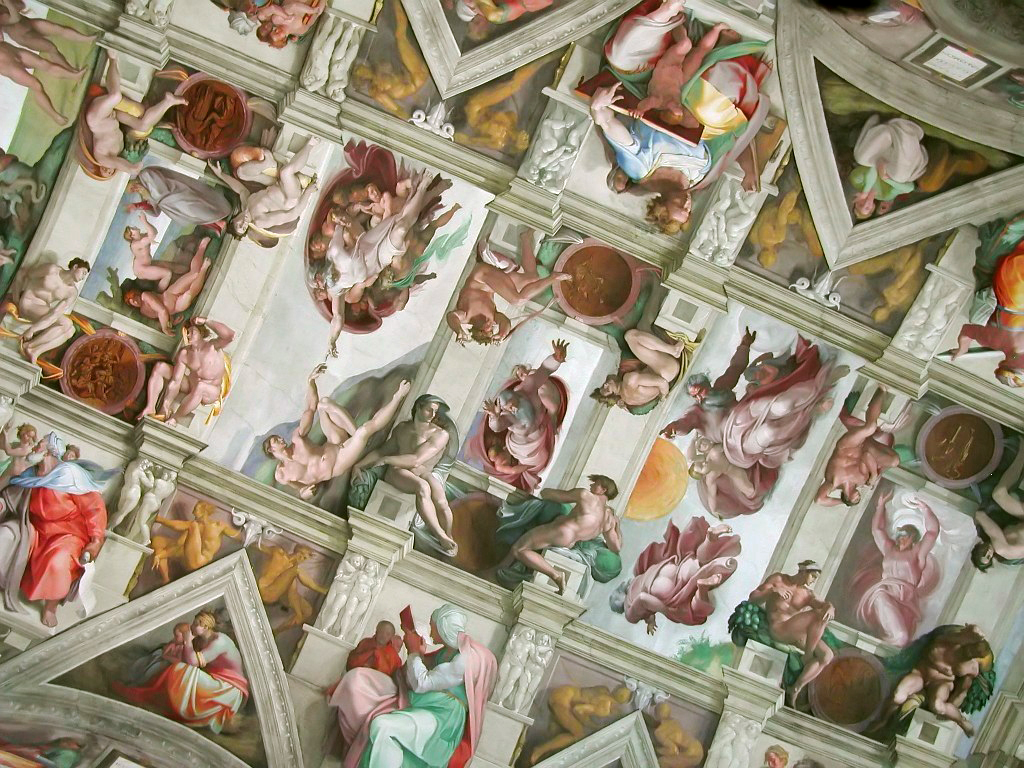
Evidence of Michelangelo's painting style is seen in the Doni Tondo. His work on the image foreshadows his technique in the Sistine Chapel.

The Doni Tondo is believed to be the only existing panel picture Michelangelo painted without the aid of assistants; and, unlike his Manchester Madonna and Entombment (both National Gallery, London), the attribution to him has never been questioned. The juxtaposition of bright colors using the cangiante technique of shading foreshadows the same use of color in Michelangelo's later Sistine Ceiling frescoes. The folds of the drapery are sharply modelled, and the modelling of the figures is distinctly sculptural, suggesting they are carved in medium marble. The nude figures in the background have softer modelling and look to be precursors to the ignudi, the male nude figures in the Sistine Ceiling frescoes. Michelangelo's technique includes shading from the most intense colors first to the lighter shades on top, using the darker colors as shadows. By applying the pigment in a certain way, Michelangelo created an "unfocused" effect in the background and focused detail in the foreground. The most vibrant color is located within the Virgin's garments, signifying her importance within the image. The masculinity of Mary could be explained by Michelangelo's use of male models for female figures, as was done for the Sistine Chapel.

Michelangelo used a limited palette of pigments comprising Lead White, Azurite, Verdigris, and a few others. He avoided ochres and used very little vermilion.

== Influences ==
The Doni Tondo was influenced by an early version of Leonardo da Vinci's The Virgin and Child with St. Anne. This is the completed version, painted in 1510.

The composition is, most likely, partially influenced by the cartoon (a term referring to a detailed later-stage preliminary drawing) for Leonardo da Vinci's The Virgin and Child with St. Anne. Michelangelo's Holy Family forms a tight, separated group in the centre foreground of the image, with the Virgin's figure constructing a typical Renaissance pyramid or triangle. Michelangelo saw the drawing in 1501 while in Florence working on the David.

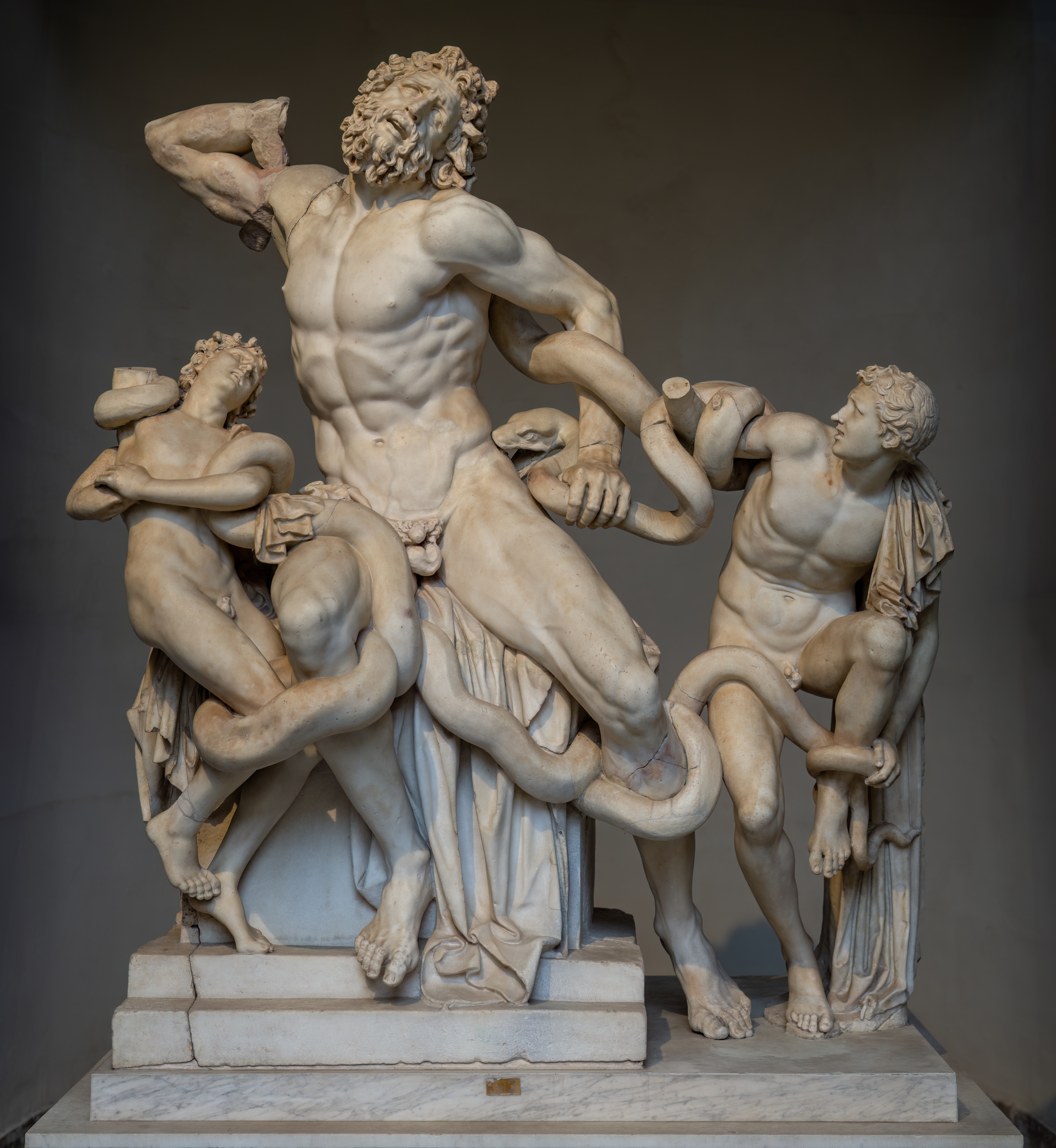
The nude figures in the tondo background are said to have been influenced by the statue of Laocoön and His Sons, found in Rome in 1506, therefore dating Michelangelo's picture later than that date.

The Doni Tondo is also associated with Luca Signorelli's Medici Madonna in the Uffizi. Michelangelo probably knew of the work and its ideas, and he wanted to incorporate those ideas into his own work. Signorelli's Madonna similarly uses a tondo form, depicts nude male figures in the background, and displays the Virgin sitting directly on the earth.

Three aspects of the painting can be attributed to an antique sardonyx cameo and a 15th-century relief from the circle of Donatello, available to Michelangelo in the Palazzo Medici: the circular form, the masculinity of Mary, and the positioning of the Christ Child. The Virgin's right arm mirrors the arm of the satyr in the cameo, and the cameo also depicts an infant located on the shoulders of the satyr, a position similar to the Christ Child being passed over the right arm of Mary.

Additionally, some scholars suggest that Michelangelo was inspired by the famous Greco-Roman group of Laocoön and His Sons, excavated in 1506 in Rome, an event at which Michelangelo is believed to have been present. The pose of the nude figure in the background immediately behind Saint Joseph, to our right, appears to have been influenced by the twisting contortions of the figures captured by the serpent in the Laocoön (again, if this were so, it would alter the date of the Doni Tondo by several years).

Furthermore, the inclusion of the five protruding heads in the paintings frame is often seen as a reference to a similar motif found on Ghiberti's Porta del Paradiso, the bronze doors of the Florence Baptistry which Michelangelo is known to have greatly admired.

== Plant symbolism ==
The plant in front of John the Baptist has aspects of both hyssop and cornflower, yet is most likely a hyssop because it grows from a wall. Cornflower is an attribute of Christ and symbolizes Heaven while hyssop symbolizes both the humility of Christ and baptism. There is a citron tree in the background, which represents the Cedar of Lebanon. Michelangelo uses the hyssop and tree as a visual representation of a quote by Rabanus Maurus, "From the Cedar of Lebanon to the hyssop which grows on a stony wall we have an explanation of the Divinity which Christ has in his Father and of the humanity that he derives from the Virgin Mary." The clover in the foreground represents the Trinity and salvation. The anemone plant represents the Trinity and the Passion of Christ.

== Scholarly theories ==
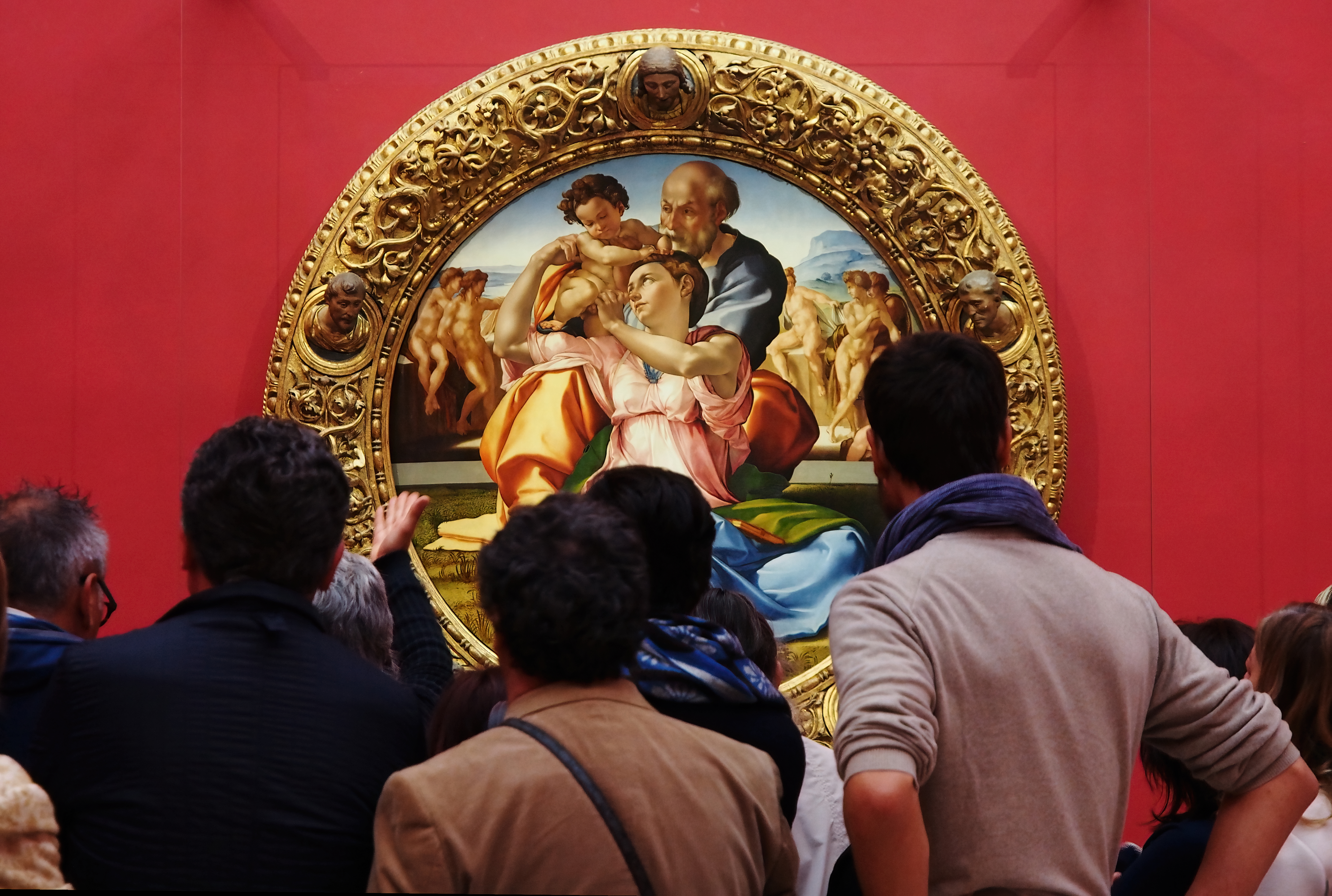
Visitors observing Doni Tondo in Uffizi Gallery

There are a multitude of interpretations for the various parts of the work. Most interpretations differ in defining the relationship between the Holy Family and the figures in the background.

Paul Barolsky argues that the Doni Tondo is a "devotional image […] more than an example of style, symbolism, [or] iconography". Barolsky bases much of his thesis on the language used by Giorgio Vasari in his work Lives of the Most Excellent Italian Painters, Sculptors, and Architects, from Cimabue to Our Times. His support for the idea of devotion comes from Christ being presented in the painting like a gift, which he links to the painting's patron due to a perceived pun on the Italian word for "gift", donare, and the patron's name, Doni (meaning literally, in Italian, 'gifts'). Furthering the Christ-as-gift metaphor, Mary's holding of Christ in the painting is seen to reference the elevating of the host during mass. Mirella Levi D'Ancona argued that the image reflects Michelangelo's views on the roles of the members of the Holy Family in human salvation and the soul's immortality. The Virgin's placement and emphasis is due to her role in human salvation. She is both the mother of Christ and the best intercessor for appealing to him. Michelangelo, who had been strongly influenced by the Dominican Fra Girolamo Savonarola in Florence, is using the picture to defend the Maculist point of view, a philosophy of the Dominican order rejecting the idea of the Immaculate Conception of Mary. The Maculist view is that the Virgin did not receive her sanctification at birth but at the moment of the incarnation of Christ; thus, the image depicts the moment of Mary's sanctification by showing the Christ Child blessing her. Michelangelo depicts Christ as if he is growing out of Mary's shoulder to take human form, one leg hanging limply and the other not visible at all, therefore making him a part of Mary. Moreover, his muscles and balance convey an upward movement, as if he is growing out of her, although he is above Mary, asserting his superiority to her. Furthermore, she argues that the nudes are to be interpreted as sinners who have removed their clothes for cleansing and purification through baptism. The water, which separates the sinners from the Holy Family, just beyond the horizontal band in the middle of the painting, can therefore be seen as the "waters of separation" mentioned in the Bible. She also argues that the five figures may represent the five parts of the soul: the higher soul (soul and intellect) on the left and the lower soul (imagination, sensation, and nourishing faculty) on the right, a visual depiction of the views of Marsilio Ficino, whom Michelangelo references in other works. Additionally, in looking at them as separate groupings, she suggests that the two figures on Mary's right represents the human and divine natures of Christ, while the three on her left represent the Trinity.

Andrée Hayum argues that the commissioning of the tondo by the Doni family helped to emphasize the "secular and domestic ideals" of the painting rather than seeing it as a "devotional object". In choosing a tondo as the format for the picture, Michelangelo is referencing the form's long association with depicting the "Adoration of the Magi, the Nativity, [and] the Madonna and Child." Hayum also finds many allusions to Noah throughout the work. She posits a referencing of the Madonna to Noah's daughter-in-law, a sibyl, which thus makes Joseph an embodiment of Noah himself. Hayum further supports this by acknowledging the direct link between Joseph and Noah as depicted in Michelangelo's Sistine Ceiling paintings. This link to Noah also gives an explanation to the nudes in the background, whose forms may have inspired the sons in Buonaratti's Sistine Chapel fresco Drunkenness of Noah. The allusion to the Noah story also brings up themes of baptismal water, thus giving rise to an interpretation of the nudes similar to D'Ancona's: "catechumens awaiting baptism" from John the Baptist, whose "isolation within a pit-like space" indicates his special role as baptizer.

Roberta Olson states that the painting depicts the "importance of the family" and is related to "Doni’s hoped-for descendants". One of the ways in which the painting depicts a "good marriage" is by the seemingly "reciprocal action" of the handling of Jesus between Joseph and Mary. Much importance is given to Joseph by way of the colors of his clothes: yellow, indicating the divine aspect of the family as well as "truth", and purple, standing for royal lineage tracing from the House of David. Additionally, Joseph is important to the painting by referencing the middle name of the "Doni's third child who lived beyond infancy". The theme of baptism is also suggested on the painting's frame through a possible reference to Ghiberti's Porta del Paradiso – being one of the three sets of doors of the Florence Baptistery (two of which by Ghiberti) – the sculpted details indirectly referring to the rite of Baptism, important for the Donis and their desire for a child as the product of a good marriage, exemplified by the Holy Family, perhaps one reason behind the commissioning of the work.

== See also ==
Media related to Tondo Doni at Wikimedia Commons

- List of works by Michelangelo

== Bibliography ==
- Barolsky, Paul (2003). "Michelangelo's Doni Tondo and the Worshipful Beholder". Notes in the History of Art. 22 (3): 8–11. doi:10.1086/sou.22.3.23206720. S2CID 192987028.
- Buzzegoli, Ezio (December 1987). "Michelangelo as a Colourist, Revealed in the Conservation of the Doni Tondo". Apollo: 405–408.
- d’Ancona, Mirella Levi (1968). "The Doni Madonna by Michelangelo: An Iconographic Study". The Art Bulletin. 50 (1). Taylor & Francis: 43–50. doi:10.2307/3048510. ISBN 978-0-8153-1823-1. JSTOR 3048510.
- Hartt, Frederick; David G. Wilkins (2003). History of Italian Renaissance Art: Fifth Edition. New Jersey: Prentice-Hall. pp. 506–508.
- Hayum, Andrée. "Michelangelo's Doni Tondo: Holy Family and Family Myth". Studies in Iconography. 7/8.1981/82(1982), No. 1: 209–251.
- Olson, Roberta J. M. (1993). "Lost and Partially Found: The Tondo, a Significant Florentine Art Form, in Documents of the Renaissance". Artibus et Historiae. 14 (27): 31–65. doi:10.2307/1483444. JSTOR 1483444.
- Olsen, Roberta J.M. (2000). "Painted Devotional Tondi: Michelangleo Buonarotti's Doni Tondo". The Florentine Tondo. New York: Oxford University Press. pp. 219–226.
- Smith, Graham (1975). "A Medici Source for Michelangelo's Doni Tondo". Zeitschrift für Kunstgeschichte. 38 Bd., H. 1 (1). Taylor & Francis: 84–85. doi:10.2307/1481909. ISBN 978-0-8153-1823-1. JSTOR 1481909.
- Zimmer, William (1991). "The Tondo". Art Journal. 50 (1): 60–63. doi:10.2307/777088. JSTOR 777088.
- Natali, Antonio (2014), Michelangelo. Inside and outside the Uffizi, Florence: Maschietto Editore, 2014. ISBN 978-88-6394-085-5
- Michelangelo Buonarroti, Doni Tondo, ColourLex
- E. Buzzegoli, R. Bellucci, Michelangelo’s Doni Tondo investigated with non-invasive analytical techniques, in Studying old master paintings, Technology and Practice, ed. by M. Spring, London 2011
