= Michelangelo Pittatore =

Italian painter (1825–1903)

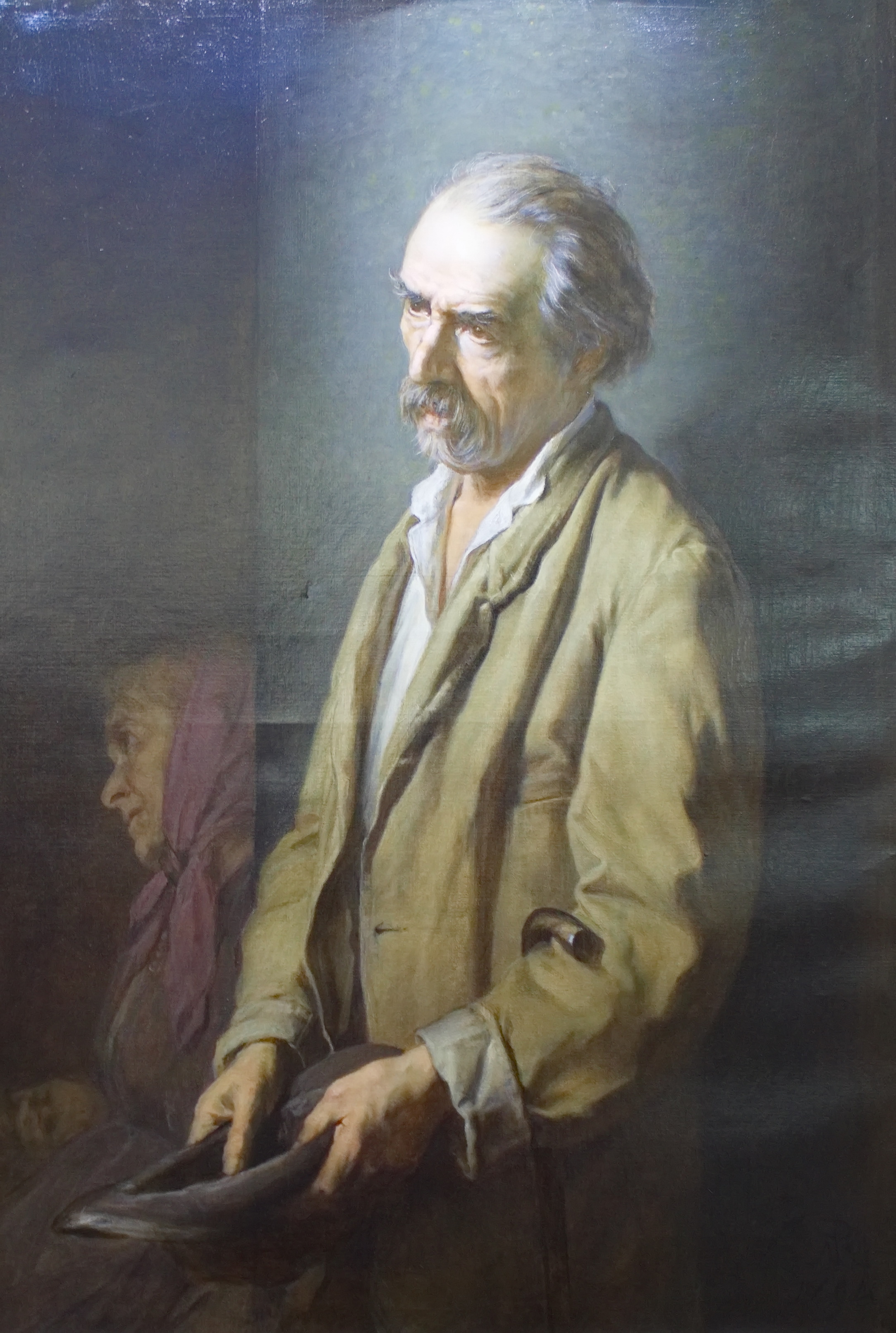
Self-portrait Dressed as a Beggar (1894)

Michelangelo Pittatore (12 February 1825, Asti - 24 March 1903, Asti) was an Italian painter who specialized in portraits and religious paintings.

== Biography ==
His father originally wanted to be a painter, but gave it up to support his family, becoming a framer and decorator instead. When he saw that his son had some artistic talent, he sent him, at the age of eleven, to study with Agostino Cottolengo, whom he remained with until 1838. When he turned fourteen, his father decided that he needed more formal instruction and enrolled him in classes at the Accademia di San Luca in Rome. He also copied works by the Old Masters and created some original works inspired by theirs.

In 1845, he received his first commission, from the knights of the Supreme Order of the Most Holy Annunciation, for portraits that would be presented to Queen Maria Cristina. The Queen was impressed and, two years later, commissioned him to do decorations for the Sanctuary of Oropa (designed by Canina), as well as some private residences. He remained in Rome until 1848, when political events made it wiser to go back home.

Thanks to commissions from the Vicar of Costigliole, he was able to return to Rome in 1852. He soon became an habitué of the Antico Caffè Greco, where he became a lifelong friend of Rudolf Lehmann. For a time, he concentrated on works that combined traditional still-lifes with elements of genre painting, although continuing to do his usual portraits. He made occasional trips home, where he created some religious works, then returned there in 1859.

In 1868, possibly at the prompting of his friend, Lehmann, he moved to London. Once there, he became part of the city's Italian community and made the acquaintance of Giuseppe Mazzini, who gave him a letter of introduction that gained him entry to the upper echelons of Victorian society. The high point of his career there was an exhibition at the Royal Academy of Arts.

He returned to Italy in 1872, where, after 1880, his portraits began to show the influence of photography. He died peacefully at home in 1903. In his will, he left 10,000 Lire to the city of Asti, to be used for art education.

== Paintings in the parish church of San Loreto (Costigliole) ==
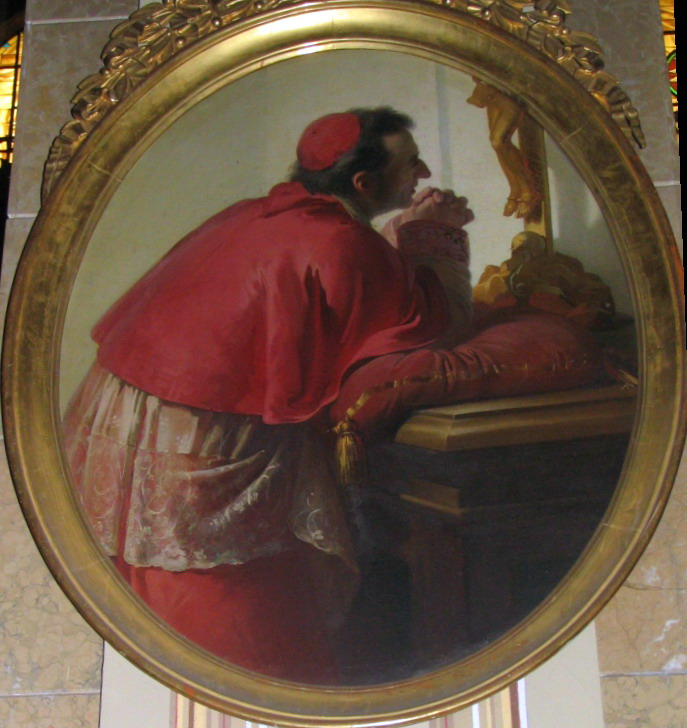
Saint Carlo Borromeo

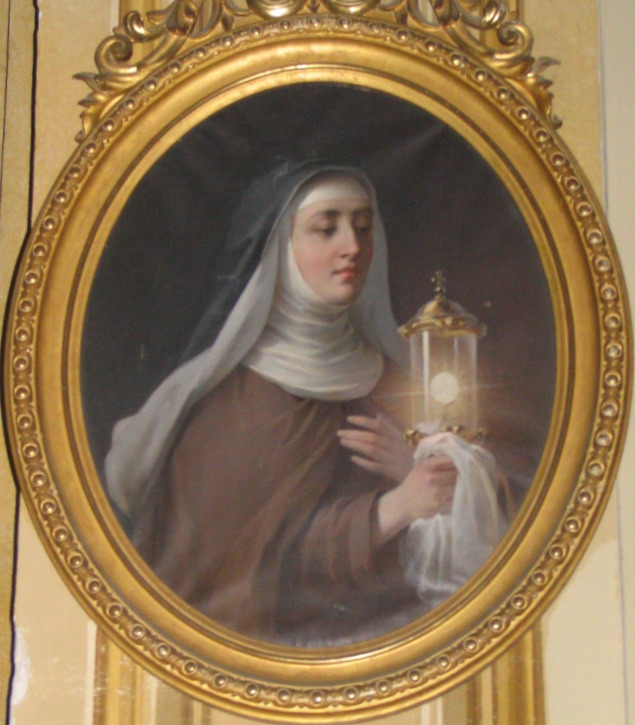
Saint Clare

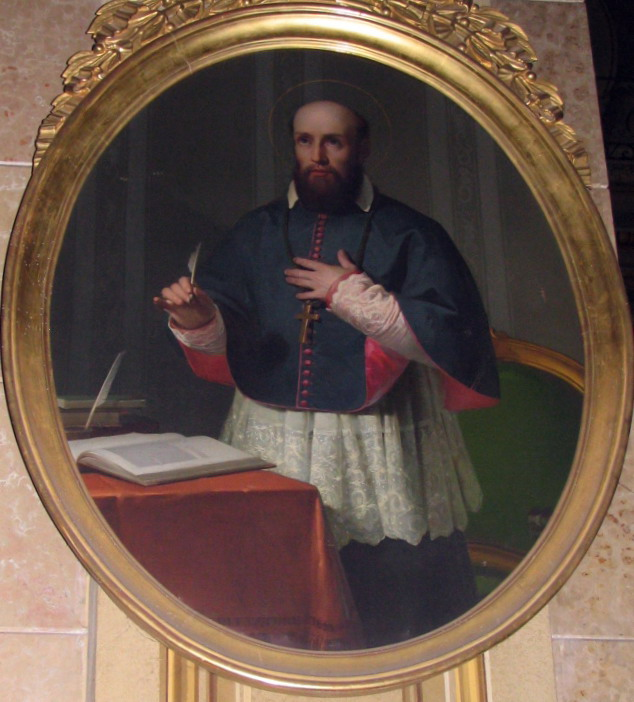
Saint Francis de Sales

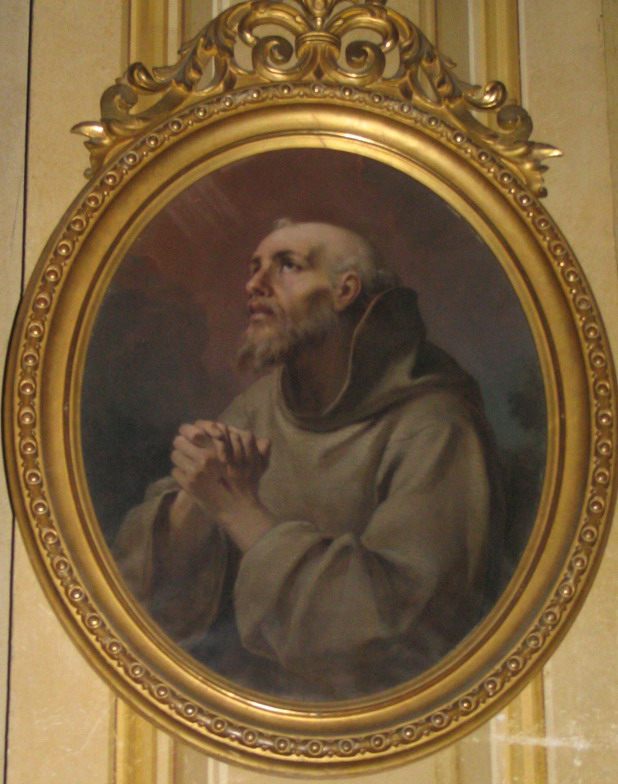
Saint Francis of Assisi
