= Study of a Kneeling Nude Girl for The Entombment =

Drawing by Michelangelo

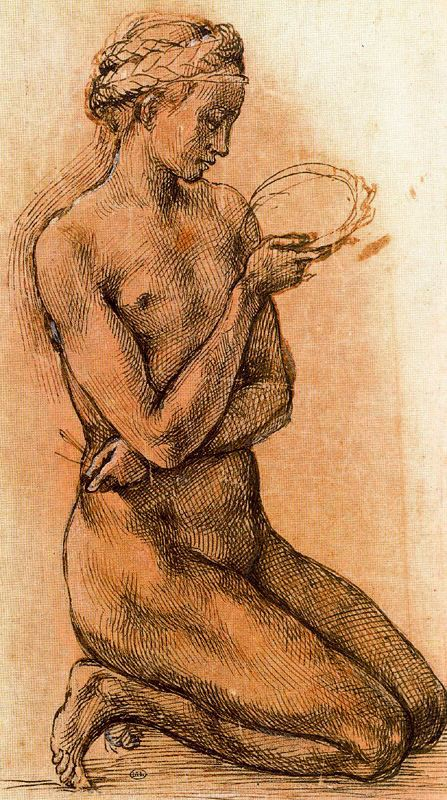
Study of a Kneeling Nude Girl for The Entombment, Michelangelo, c. 1500–1501.

Study of a Kneeling Nude Girl for The Entombment is a drawing of c. 1500–1501 by Michelangelo, now in the Louvre Museum. It is in black chalk, with pen and ink and white highlighting, on pink prepared (coloured) paper, and measures 26.6 cm x 15.1 cm. It is a figure study made in preparation for his painting The Entombment, and is Michelangelo's only surviving study that was probably drawn from a nude female model. It also may be the earliest extant European drawing of a nude female model.

The figure in the drawing relates to a woman seated in the lower left foreground of the painting. Included in the study are narrative details such as the nails of the cross, held in her left hand, and the crown of thorns in her right. Although the drawing's attribution has been doubted, it is now accepted as authentic. The elaboration of the plaited hair suggests that the drawing was made from life using a young girl as the model. The drawing was made in three stages: first it was lightly laid down in black chalk, then gone over with pen and light bistre, and finally drawn over completely with a finer pen and darker ink. Lateral strokes were placed at the bottom to indicate the ground plane, and touches of white body color were added to details of the figure. Rare for a drawing by Michelangelo is the pink ground, in this case achieved by rubbing crushed red chalk onto the paper.

Because the use of nude female models was controversial, relatively few such drawings were made before the 17th century, when academic life classes were established. Before that boys or young men, typically studio apprentices, were used as models for figures of both sexes, as is sometimes rather apparent. Exceptions from the Italian Renaissance include Raphael, who made nude drawings, apparently of his mistress, and Lorenzo Lotto, who recorded in his account book having used women of ill repute as life models. In Florence, Michelangelo and Raphael initiated the practice of making preparatory studies of the nude prior to painting the figure fully clothed, in order to better understand the underlying structure of the body.

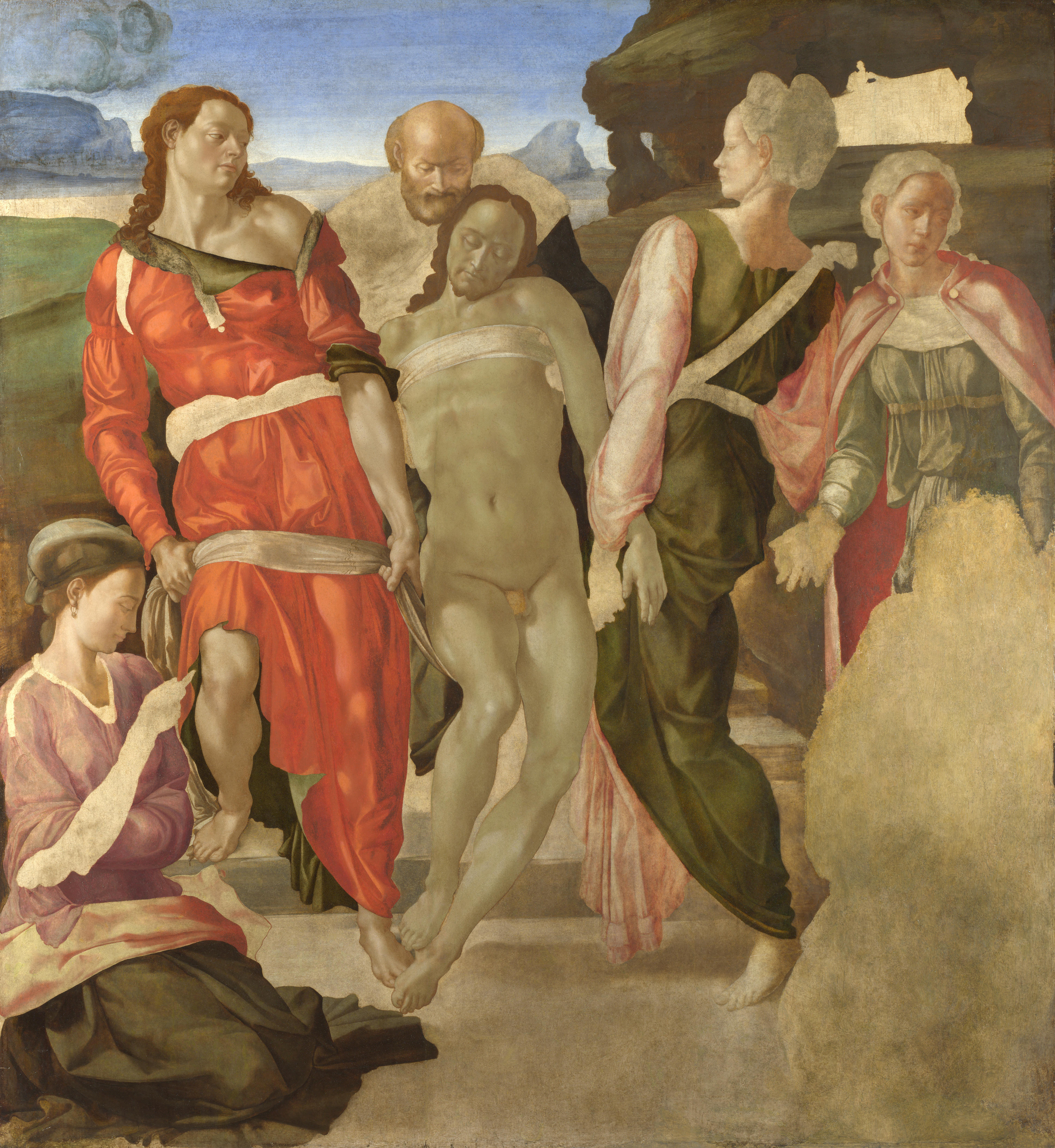
The Entombment, Michelangelo, c. 1500–1501. Oil on wood, 161.7 cm x 149.9 cm. National Gallery, London.

== See also ==
- List of works by Michelangelo
