= The Entombment (Michelangelo) =

Unfinished painting by Michelangelo

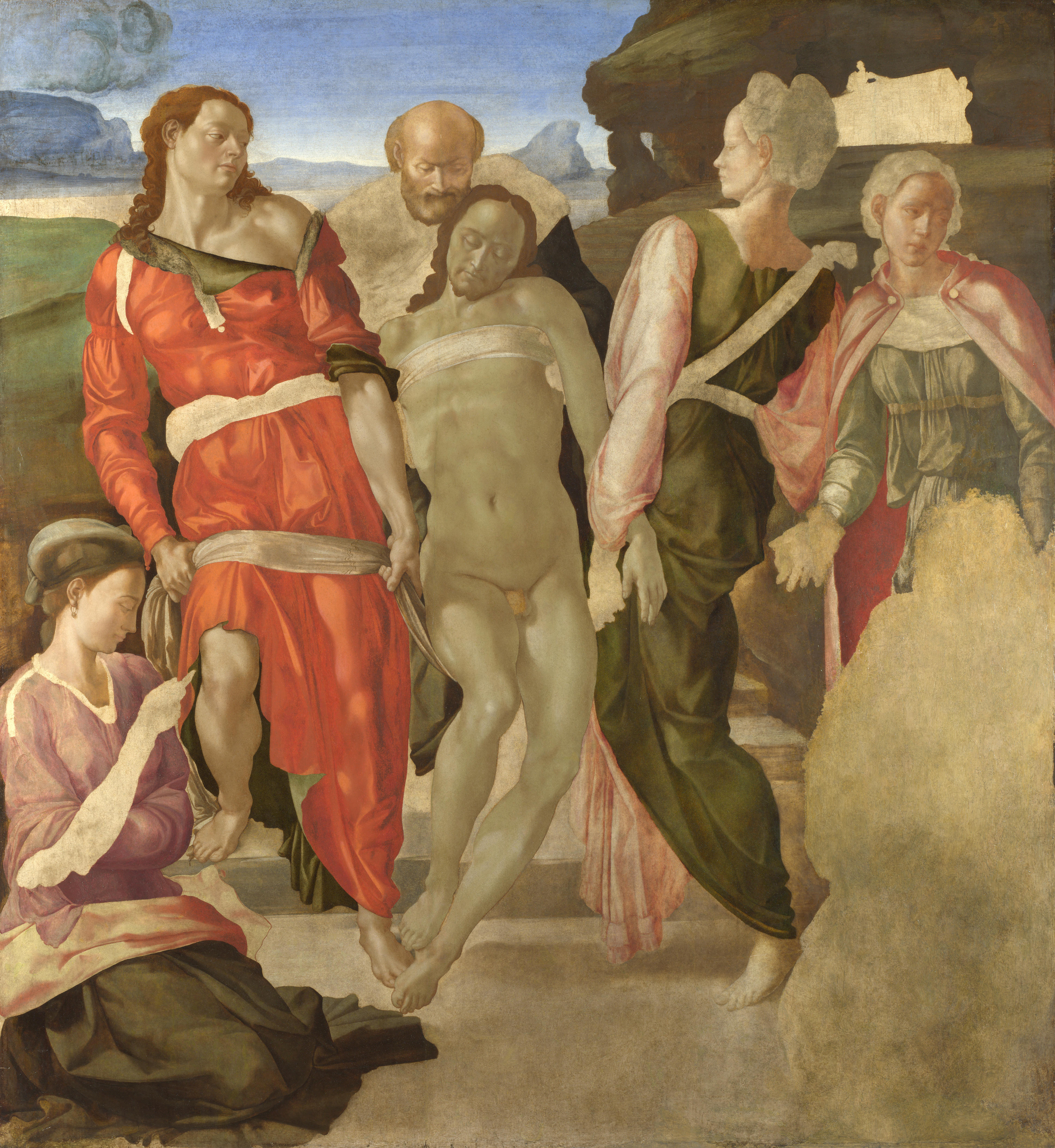
- Artist: Michelangelo
- Year: c. 1500–1501
- Catalogue: NG790
- Medium: oil on panel
- Dimensions: 161.7 cm × 149.9 cm (63.7 in × 59.0 in)
- Condition: Unfinished
- Location: National Gallery, London
- Preceded by: Rondanini Pietà
- Followed by: Doni Tondo

The Entombment is an unfinished oil-on-panel painting of the burial of Jesus, now generally attributed to the Italian Renaissance master Michelangelo Buonarroti and dated to around 1500 or 1501. It is in the National Gallery in London, which purchased the work in 1868 from Robert Macpherson, a Scottish photographer resident in Rome, who, according to various conflicting accounts, had acquired the painting there some 20 years earlier. It is one of a handful of paintings attributed to Michelangelo, alongside the Manchester Madonna, the Doni Tondo, and possibly, The Torment of Saint Anthony.

== History ==
The chronological position of this work has been the source of some dispute, although it is generally considered an early work. Some authorities believe that it may have been executed by one of Michelangelo's pupils from a drawing by the master or was a direct imitation of his work.

According to documents discovered in 1981, Michelangelo had been commissioned in 1500 to paint a panel for the funerary chapel at the church of Sant'Agostino in Rome, but in the end gave back the sum received. It is probable that this work was The Entombment, which remained unfinished upon Michelangelo's return to Florence in 1501. The subject would be appropriate for a chapel dedicated to the pietà, and in its position it would be lit from the left, like the depicted scene in the painting. The description of the painting in the National Gallery's catalogue suggests that Michelangelo departed to secure the large block of marble that would become his David sculpture, which he undertook to sculpt in 1501.

== Depiction ==
The centre of the panel portrays the naked body of the dead Christ being carried up a flight of steps to the sepulchre, which was intended to be painted in the blank area in the rocks at the top right of the work.

Michelangelo's typically androgynous depiction of the other figures makes it difficult to identify them securely. The bearded older man behind Jesus is possibly Joseph of Arimathea, who gave up his tomb for use as Christ's sepulchre, or perhaps Nicodemus, who assisted with preparing Christ's body for burial. The long-haired figure on the left wearing a long orange-red gown is probably St. John the Evangelist. The woman kneeling at his feet is possibly one of the Three Marys, perhaps Mary Magdalene: a preliminary study of a kneeling woman in the Louvre depicts her naked, with the crown of thorns and three nails. The Louvre also holds a drawing of a naked standing man, which may be a study for St. John.

The identity of the two figures on the right is uncertain. Suggestions for the figure standing to the right side of the body of Jesus, supporting it along with St John, range from Nicodemus to another of the Marys, perhaps Mary Cleophas, while the figure on the far right may be Mary Salome. The large unfinished area at the bottom right was intended for a kneeling figure of the Virgin Mary.

The floating appearance of some of the figures may be partly explained by the fact that the painting is intended to be viewed from below, and to the fact that it is unfinished. However, the apparent incongruity of the stance of the bearer on the right remains problematical.

Many of the unfinished parts of the painting, such as the cloak of the missing Virgin, would have required quantities of the expensive blue pigment ultramarine made from powdered lapis lazuli. If this was in short supply, it could be that this would have held up completion of the painting, which may explain why it was unfinished. However, even if this were so, it would not explain why the artist could not have completed the many other parts of the painting that did not require any blue.

The composition is a novel one, with the body of Jesus typically held horizontally in paintings of the Entombment, although earlier examples with Jesus held vertically that may have influenced Michelangelo include a 1438-1440 predella to the San Marco Altarpiece by Fra Angelico, and Domenico Ghirlandaio. The upright posture of Jesus may allude to his imminent bodily resurrection, and the raising of the sacramental bread at the celebration of the Eucharist. The unfinished nature of the work reveals Michelangelo's painting technique, completing areas in turn in the manner of a fresco or tempera work, rather than sketching out the whole work and adding details, as for example Raphael or Leonardo would have done. It also shows areas of paint that Michelangelo scratched away, for example the rocks.

The work was in the Farnese collection by the 1650s. After passing through other collections in Rome, it was acquired by Robert Turnbull Macpherson. It was attributed to Michelangelo by the German painters Peter von Cornelius and Friedrich Overbeck in 1864. Initially the attribution was rejected, and it was accorded to the so-called "Master of the Manchester Madonna" which was itself later attributed to Michelangelo.

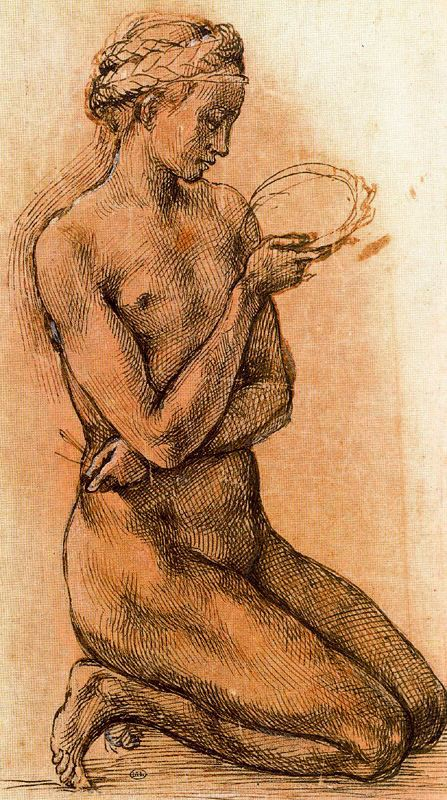
Michelangelo, sketch of a kneeling woman, Louvre

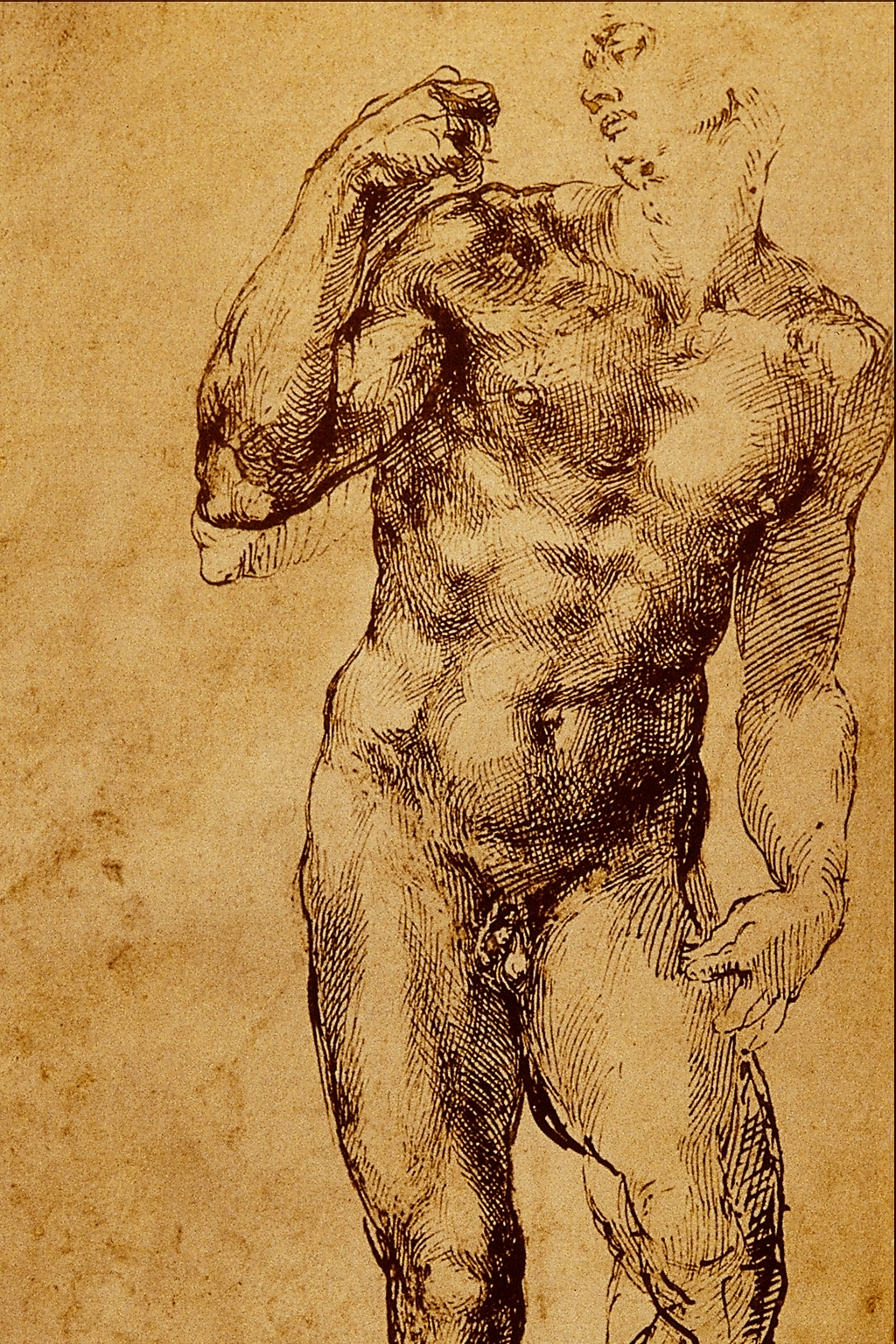
Michelangelo, sketch of a standing man, Louvre

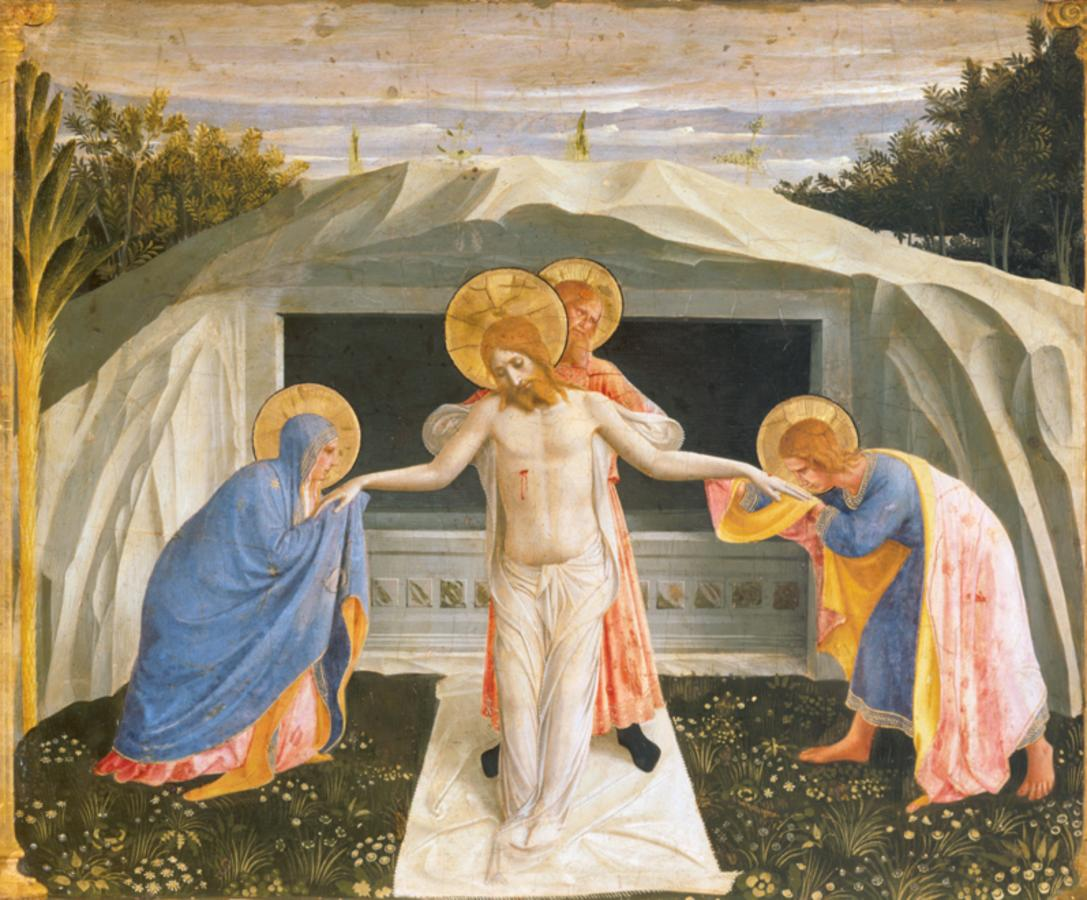
Fra Angelico, Entombment predella, 1438–1440, Alte Pinakothek

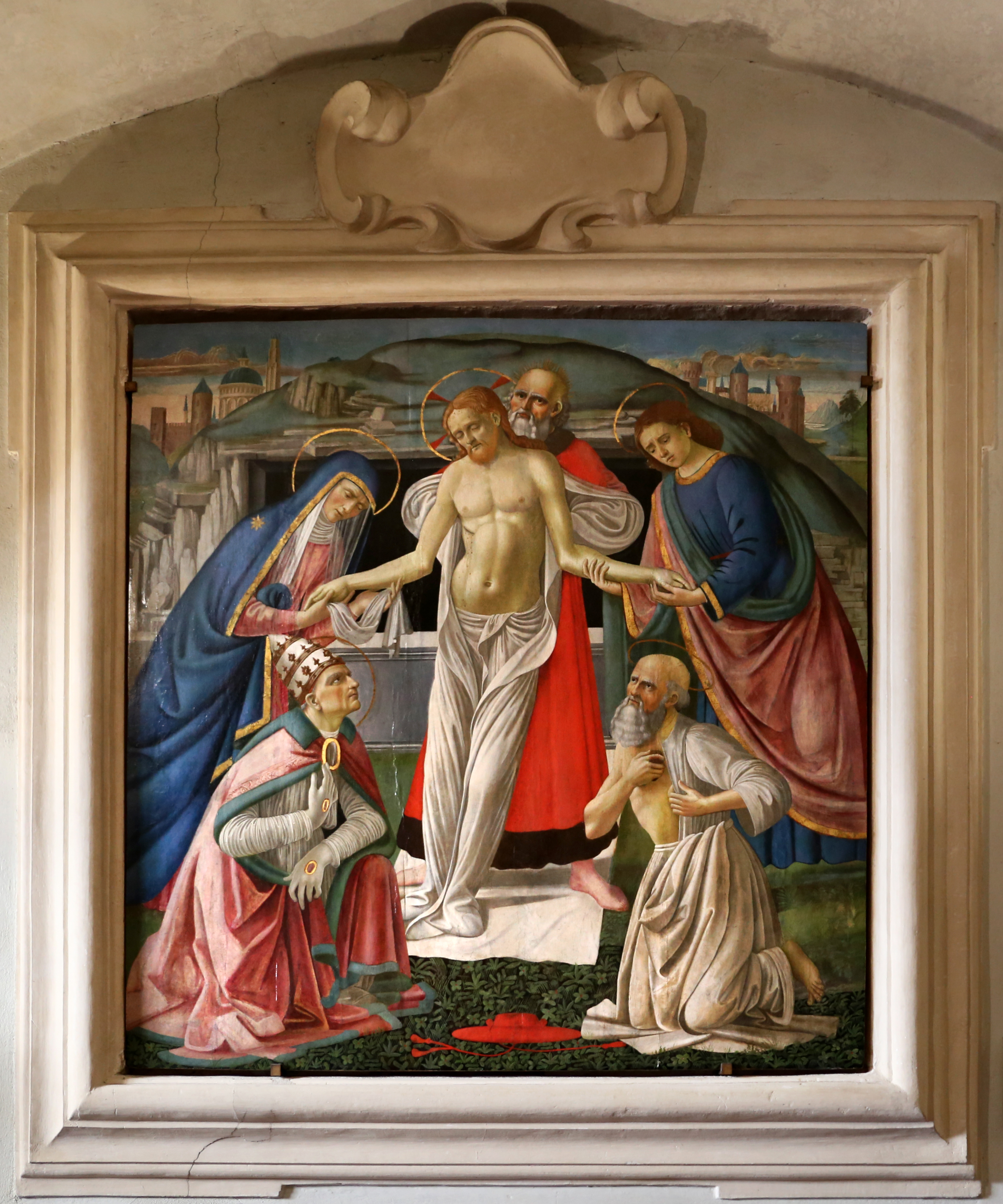
Workshop of Domenico Ghirlandaio, Dead Christ before the Tomb, c.1485, Badia a Settimo

== See also ==
- List of works by Michelangelo
- Dying Slave
