= Robert Turnbull Macpherson =

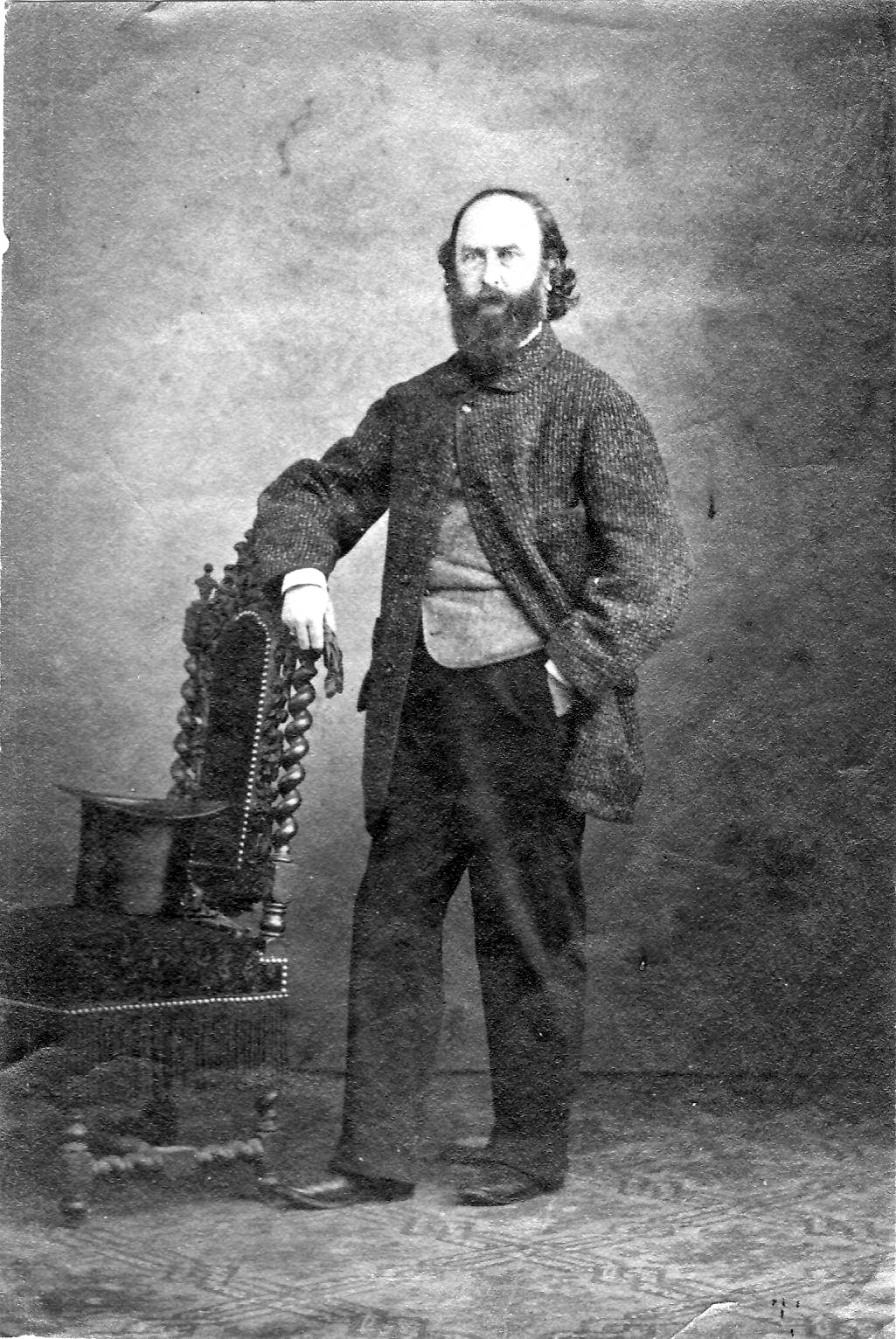
- Born: 27 February 1814; Dalkeith, Scotland
- Died: 17 November 1872 (aged 58); Rome, Italy
- Occupations: Artist, photographer
- Spouse: Louisa Gerardine Bate

Robert Turnbull Macpherson (27 February 1814 – 17 November 1872) was a Scottish artist and photographer who worked in Rome, Italy, in the 19th century.

== Early life ==
Robert Turnbull Macpherson was born on 27 February 1814 in Dalkeith, Scotland, outside the city of Edinburgh. Although family friend and author Margaret Oliphant described him as a close relative of Clan Macpherson chief Ewan Macpherson of Cluny and "the nearest male relative" of poet James Macpherson, the exact relationships are uncertain. Nothing is known of Macpherson's childhood until his study in medicine at the University of Edinburgh between 1831 and 1835. He apparently did not complete his medical studies, and subsequently studied art at the Royal Scottish Academy in Edinburgh, where he exhibited portraits between 1835 and 1839. His only known surviving work from this period is Templar Knight at Roslin Chapel, an oil painting dated 1836. In 1840 he left Scotland for Rome, Italy.

== Early career in Rome ==
During his initial years in Rome, Macpherson continued to practice as a painter. While records exist of several works between 1840 and 1845, only one is known to survive from Macpherson's time in Rome—a large oil painting of the Roman Campagna, dated 1842.

In addition to painting, he worked as an art dealer. His most notable acquisition was a large, dark panel which he purchased in 1846. After cleaning the piece, it was identified as The Entombment of Christ, an unfinished work by Michelangelo. Macpherson smuggled the painting out of Rome, and in 1868 sold it to the National Gallery in London for £2000.

In 1847, Macpherson met and fell in love with seventeen-year-old Louisa Gerardine ("Geddie") Bate, who had travelled from London to Rome in the company of her aunt, the art historian Anna Jameson. Macpherson and Bate continued the relationship after Bate's return to England, despite her parents' and aunt's objections, and were married in September 1849, in Ealing.

== Photography ==
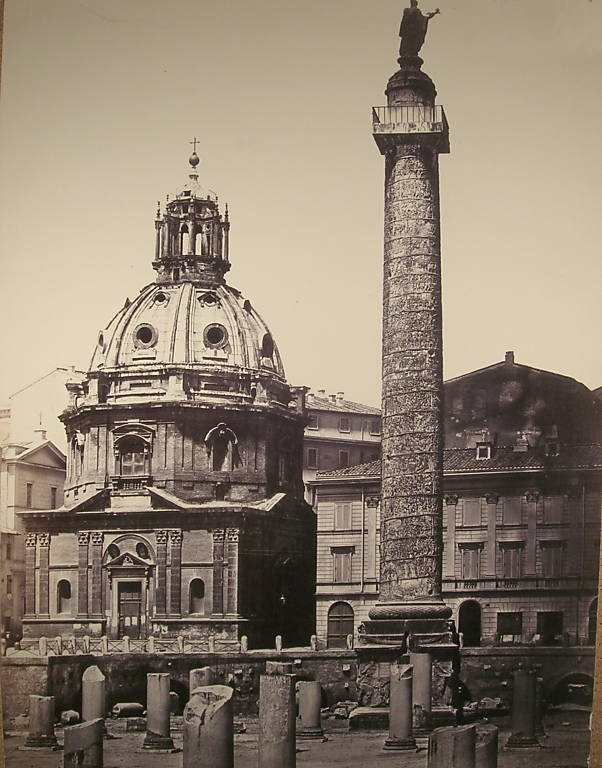
Forum of Trajan

In 1851, having failed to achieve notice as a painter, Macpherson turned to the new art of photography, using albumin on glass negatives. By 1856 he had transitioned to collodio-albumin, allowing the easier transport of dry plates. He typically used large-format negatives and long exposure times to attain exceptional detail of Roman architecture, monuments, ruins, landscapes, and sculptures. His work emphasised careful composition of scenes to capture three-dimensional architectural relationships on the two-dimensional photographic medium. Macpherson emphasised the artistic aspects of his photography, stating in 1863 that "I remain a photographer to this day, without any feeling that by doing so I have abandoned art, or have in any way forfeited my claim to the title of artist."

By the early 1860s, Macpherson's photographic career was near its zenith, with exhibitions in Edinburgh and London. His work received critical acclaim, with "subjects chosen with fine taste and the pictures executed with skill and delicacy."

Macpherson was the first photographer permitted to photograph inside the Vatican, and in 1863 published Vatican Sculptures, Selected and Arranged in the Order in which they are Found in the Galleries, a guide book to 125 Vatican sculptures featuring woodcut illustrations carved by his wife from his photographs.

Although resident in Rome, Macpherson remained an active member of the Photographic Society of Scotland. However, The Scotsman newspaper noted in his obituary that he was "the father of photography in the Eternal City [Rome]."

== Later life ==
By the late 1860s, Macpherson's fortunes were in decline. His health had deteriorated due to malaria, and the increasing political instability in Rome reduced the stream of British tourists that made up much of his customer base. At the same time, technical advances in photography moved the medium from the realm of artists to that of a commodity.

Robert Macpherson died on 17 November 1872. His funeral was held at the artists' church in Rome, Santa Maria del Popolo. His remains were buried in Campo Verano, but the grave has since been lost. He was survived by his wife, Gerardine, and their children William (who appears in the Italian record as "Guglielmo"), Joseph ("Giuseppe"), Ada ("Aida"), and Francis or Frank ("Francesco").

Over the course of his photographic career, Macpherson catalogued 1,019 photographs. Today, significant numbers may be found at George Eastman House, the J. Paul Getty Museum, the Courtauld Institute of Art, the Harry Ransom Center, and the British School at Rome. Smaller collections, both public and private, are found worldwide.

== Bibliography ==
- Becchetti, Pietro and Carlo Pietrangeli, Robert Macpherson: Un inglese fotografo a Roma; Rome: Quasar Editions, 1987.
- Crawford, Alistair, "Robert Macpherson 1814–72, The Foremost Photographer of Rome", in Papers of the British School at Rome, Vol. 67 (1999); pp. 353–403.
- Crawford, Alistair, "Robert Macpherson 1814–1872: The Final Proof", in Jubilee – 30 Years ESHPh; Congress of Photography in Vienna, 2008.
- Freeman, James, Gatherings from an Artist's Portfolio in Rome, Vol. 2; Boston: Roberts Brothers, 1883.
- Macpherson, Gerardine, Memoirs of the life of Anna Jameson; Boston: Roberts Brothers, 1878.
- Macpherson, Robert, Vatican Sculptures, Selected and Arranged in the Order in which they are Found in the Galleries; London: Chapman & Hall, 1863.
- McKenzie, Ray, "Scottish Photographers in Nineteenth-century Italy. Robert Macpherson and his Contemporaries", in History of Photography, Vol. 20 (Spring, 1996); pp. 33–40.
- Munsterberg, Marjorie, "A Biographical Sketch of Robert Macpherson", in The Art Bulletin, Vol. 68, No. 1 (March 1986); pp. 142–153.
- Nisbet, Jeff, "The Rosslyn Templar", in Girnigoe: Scotland’s Clan Sinclair Magazine, August 2010.
- Wooters, David, "The Quiet Art of Robert Macpherson: An Explication", in History of Photography, Vol. 20 (Spring, 1996); pp. 2–3.
