= Verdaccio =

Pigment used in fresco painting

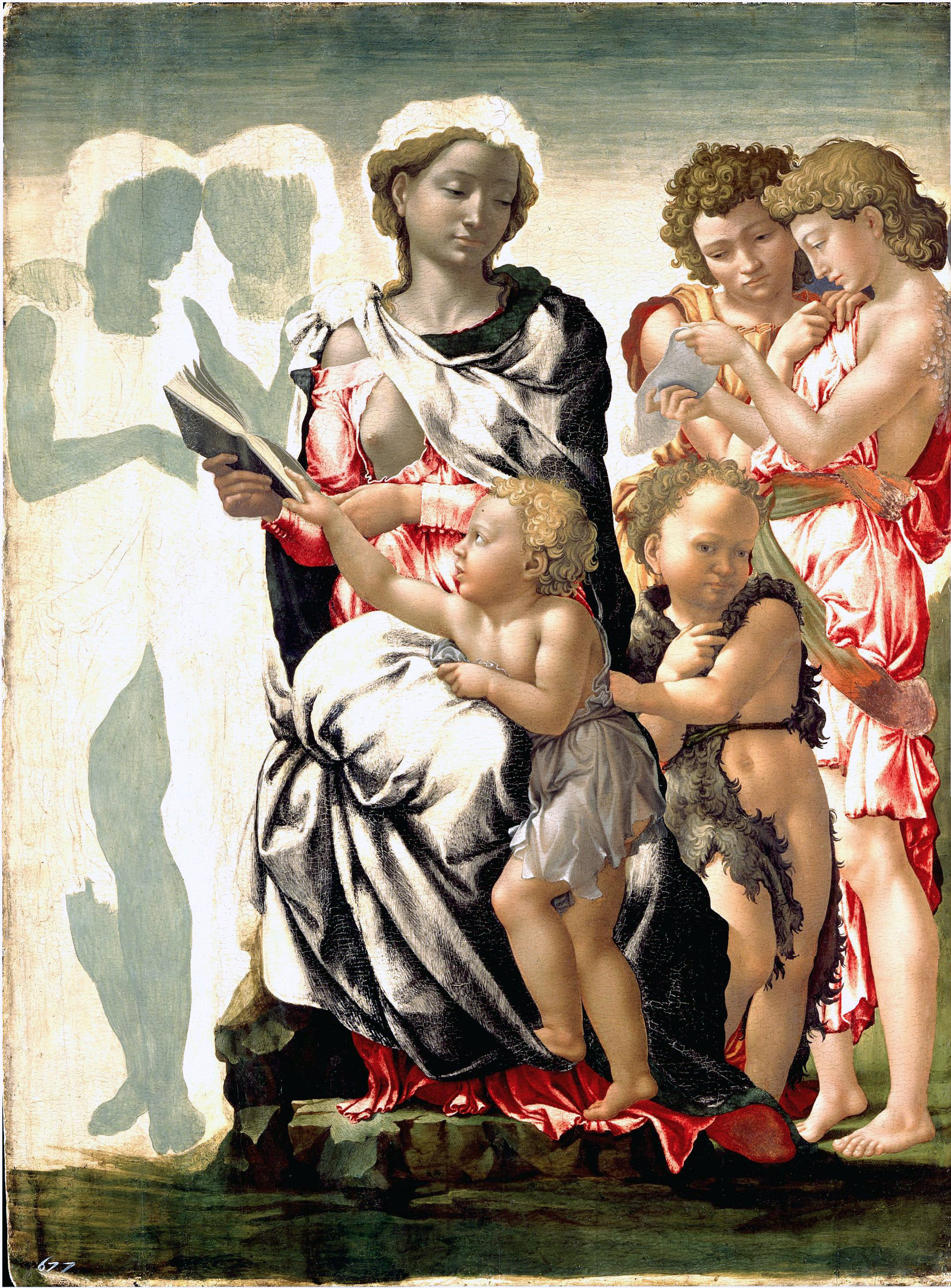
Michelangelo, Manchester Madonna, National Gallery, London

Verdaccio is a monochromatic green underpainting technique often used to render flesh in art. The paint is composed of green pigment (such as green earth, viridian or chromium oxide) and white lead, with other pigments used to darken or adjust the tone. In the Manchester Madonna, the unfinished figures to the left show the verdaccio layer. The term derives from the Italian verde, meaning green.

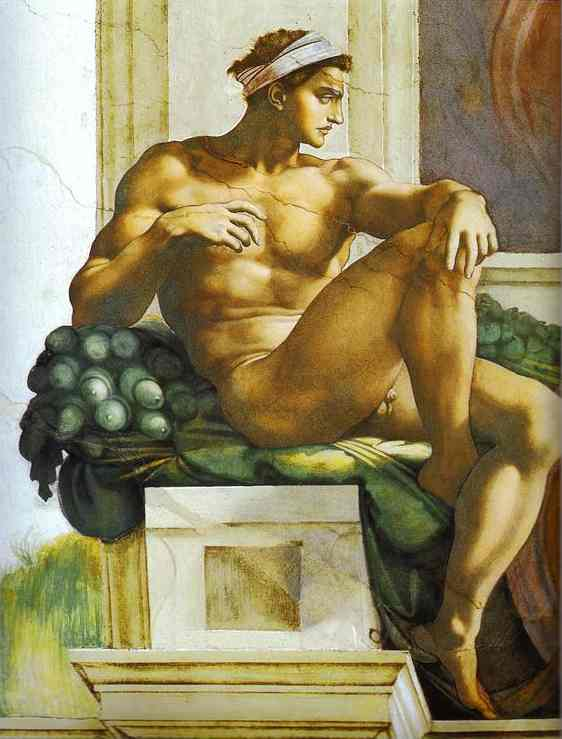
A part of the Sistine Chapel ceiling painted by Michelangelo. The Illusionistic architectural features remain in verdaccio, with the shadowed sections rendered as a darker shade of green.

During the Italian Renaissance, verdaccio became an integral part of fresco painting. The layer defined tonal values that would form a complete monochromatic underpainting. Often, architectural details in frescoes are left in verdaccio without any additional color layers. A notable example is the ceiling of the Sistine Chapel, where the verdaccio layer is left visible on architectural details in the composition. Verdaccio was also employed in tempera works; since tempera is opaque and dries quickly, the verdaccio underpainting would render the values of the image while fine lines of pink and ochre would establish flesh tones.

In oil painting, a similar technique is used by Flemish painters, referred to as the "dead layer," is applied over the traditional bone colour (one part raw umber to one part yellow ochre) priming to refine the values and remove the warm tone of the primer. The resulting "white to olive green to black" underpainting is "like being illuminated by moonlight." It does not affect the tonality of the final painting.
