= Portrait of Maddalena Doni =

Painting by Raphael

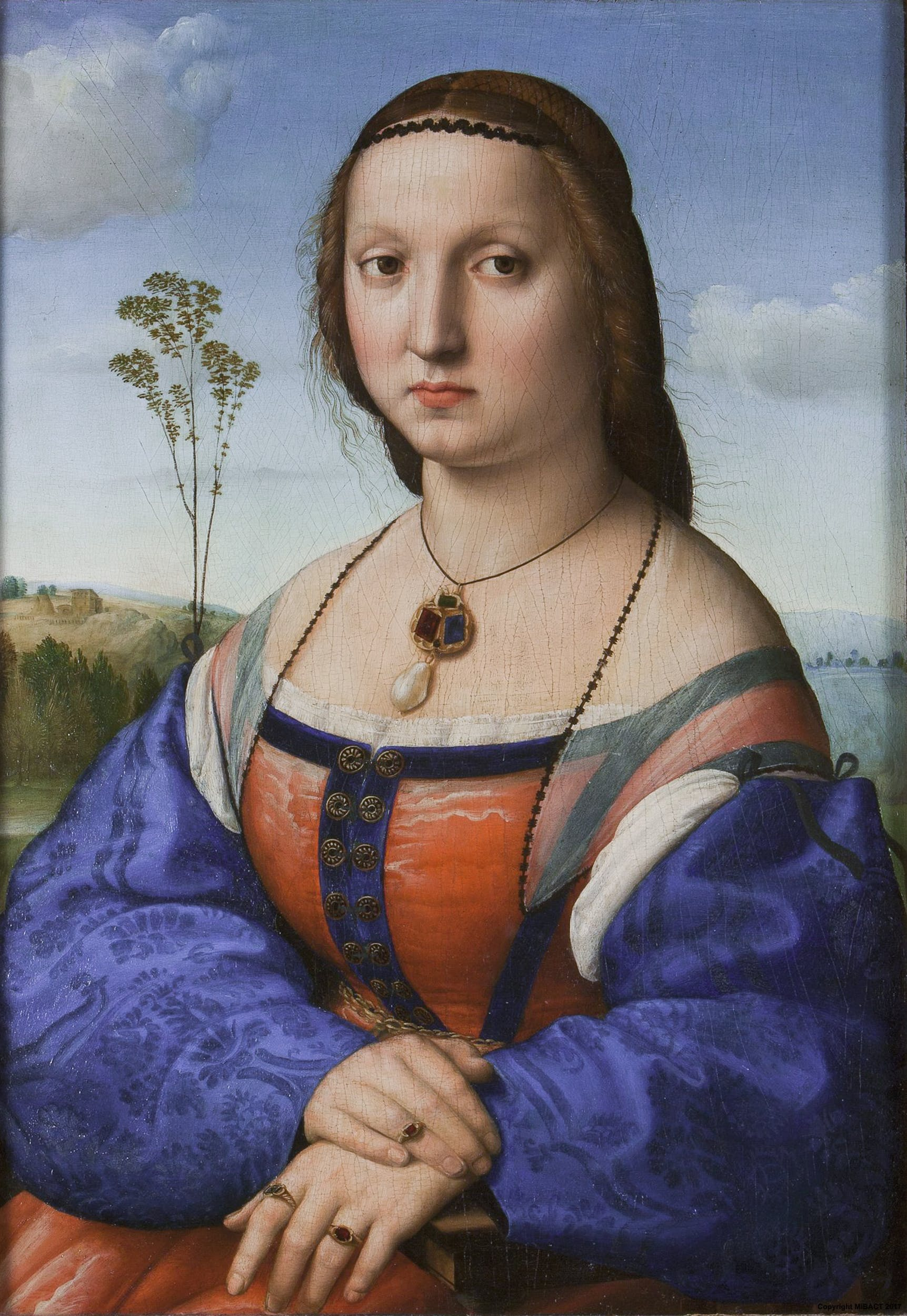
- Artist: Raphael
- Year: c. 1504–1507
- Medium: Oil on wood
- Subject: Maddalena Doni
- Dimensions: 65 cm x 45.8 cm
- Location: Uffizi, Florence, Italy

The Portrait of Maddalena Doni is an oil painting by Italian Renaissance master Raphael, made c. 1504–1507. It is in the Uffizi in Florence.

The Portrait of Agnolo Doni, Maddalena's husband and a rich cloth merchant, was made by Raphael at the same time.

== Description and style ==
Maddalena Strozzi belonged to the noble and powerful Strozzi family, the richest in Florence from the 13th to the 15th centuries. The banker and humanist Palla Strozzi (1428–1491) built the Palazzo Strozzi in Florence. Maddalena married Agnolo Doni in 1504, who also commissioned the Doni Tondo from Michelangelo.

Raphael's portraits may have been painted from 1504 to 1507, but most likely in 1506, the period in which the painter studied the art of Leonardo da Vinci most closely.

The composition of the portraits resembles that of the Mona Lisa, and the figures are presented in the same way in respect to the picture plane. Their hands, like those of the Mona Lisa, are placed on top of one another. But the low horizon of the landscape background permits a careful assessment of the human figure by providing a uniform light which defines surfaces and volumes. This relationship between landscape and figure presents a clear contrast to the striking settings of Leonardo, which communicate the threatening presence of nature.

But the most notable characteristic that distinguishes these portraits from those of Leonardo is the overall sense of serenity which even the close attention to the materials of clothes and jewels (which draw attention to the couple's wealth) is unable to attenuate. Every element, even those of secondary importance, works together to create a precise balance.

These works, linked not only by the kinship of the subjects, but also by their evident stylistic homogeneity, mark the beginning of Raphael's artistic maturity.

== See also ==
- List of paintings by Raphael
- Portrait of Agnolo Doni
