= The Divided Lady =

Book by Bruce Marshall

- First UK edition
- Author: Bruce Marshall
- Cover artist: Dodie Masterman
- Language: English
- Publisher: Collins (UK); Houghton Mifflin (US)
- Publication date: 1960
- Publication place: Scotland
- Media type: Print (paperback)
- Pages: 158

The Divided Lady is a 1960 novel by Scottish writer Bruce Marshall.

== Plot summary ==
The style of this book is unusual for a Marshall work. The first half of the book alternates present time with flashbacks from the central character's earlier life.

James Childers, an accountant with a large London firm is sent to Rome to investigate a business deal. The Sisters of Ramoth-Gilead have invested a considerable sum with Morobito, a famous film producer, to make a movie about St. Joseph Benedict Cottolengo of Turin. The Sisters suspect they have been swindled.

Childers, who served in Rome in the post-World War II era, quickly revisits old haunts. The chapters switch back and forth between events during his original tour in Rome and the current one.

Post-World War II Childers worked for the British Army dealing with Displaced Persons, specifically their financial situations. In his spare time he pursued Phoebe & Sarah, beautiful, identical twins who are aides of the General Childers also works for.

In the present time, while investigating the Sisters' case, Childers renews his acquaintanceship with Bice, the daughter of a wealthy Duke who was a teenager when he was last in Rome. Bice hopes to use this relationship to get a part in Morobito's film.

But Childers also meets Mila, who is what the Italians call a "Divided Lady," meaning that she is separated from her husband and hoping to obtain an annulment from the Catholic Church.
