= Gerardine Macpherson =

English biographer and illustrator

- Born: 1830
- Died: 1878 (aged 47–48)
- Occupations: Biographer; illustrator; journalist

Gerardine Macpherson (1830–1878), was a 19th-century English biographer and illustrator.

== Biography ==
Gerardine Macpherson was born Gerardine (nicknamed "Geddie" by her family) Bate in London, England, in 1830.

Gerardine was the first-born child of Henry and Louisa Bate; their younger child, Camilla, was emotionally close to her elder sister throughout their lives. The sisters' aunt, Louisa Murphy Bate's oldest sister, was the literary and art critic Anna Brownell Jameson. After Henry Bate was bankrupted, the childless Jameson assumed responsibility for Gerardine's education and took her traveling through Europe.

In 1840, Jameson wrote to her friend Ottilie von Goethe about her favorite niece, saying that she was "growing a great tall, wild girl, and requires good discipline".

In 1846-1847, Jameson and Gerardine traveled in France and Italy with the eloping Robert and Elizabeth Barrett Browning. Near the end of this trip, early in 1847, Geddie met her future husband, Scottish artist Robert Turnbull Macpherson, in Rome.

Jameson did not approve of Geddie's growing affection for Robert Macpherson: in part because he had converted to Roman Catholicism, in part because of his flamboyance and Italophilic adoption of some Roman customs. Jameson wrote, "Gerardine does not go on to my satisfaction".

Delayed by revolution in Rome in 1848 and hindered by poor finances and initial parental disfavor, Gerardine and Robert finally were married at Ealing on 4 September 1849. She and Robert had four children who survived to adulthood: William (nicknamed "Willy" by the family), Frank ("Francesco"), Ada ("Aida"), and Percy. Jameson eventually made peace with the marriage and visited the couple in Rome in 1855 and in 1857.

Though an artistically successful photographer, Robert was often in poor health. Gerardine supplemented the family finances through creating engraved illustrations, including for Jameson's Sacred and Legendary Art (1848) and Jameson's second edition of Legends of the Madonna (1857). She also illustrated her husband's Vatican Sculptures (1863) and helped with his photography business, particularly in developing prints from the glass negative plates.

Robert died in November 1872, leaving his widow and children nearly destitute. She made ends meet through reporting as a newspaper correspondent during the Roman Summer (when regular correspondents sought to leave the malarial Italian capital city), teaching English, and working as an amanuensis. She also wrote the first biography of Anna Brownell Jameson, published after Gerardine's death as Memoirs of the Life of Anna Jameson (1878); the Macphersons' friend, the novelist Margaret Oliphant, wrote the preface to this biography. It remained the principal life of Jameson until Clara Thomas's 1967 publication of Winter Studies and summer Rambles in Canada.

== Death ==
Careworn and in ill health, Gerardine Macpherson died in Rome on 24 May 1878.
