= Portrait of Agnolo Doni =

Painting by Raphael in the Palazzo Pitti

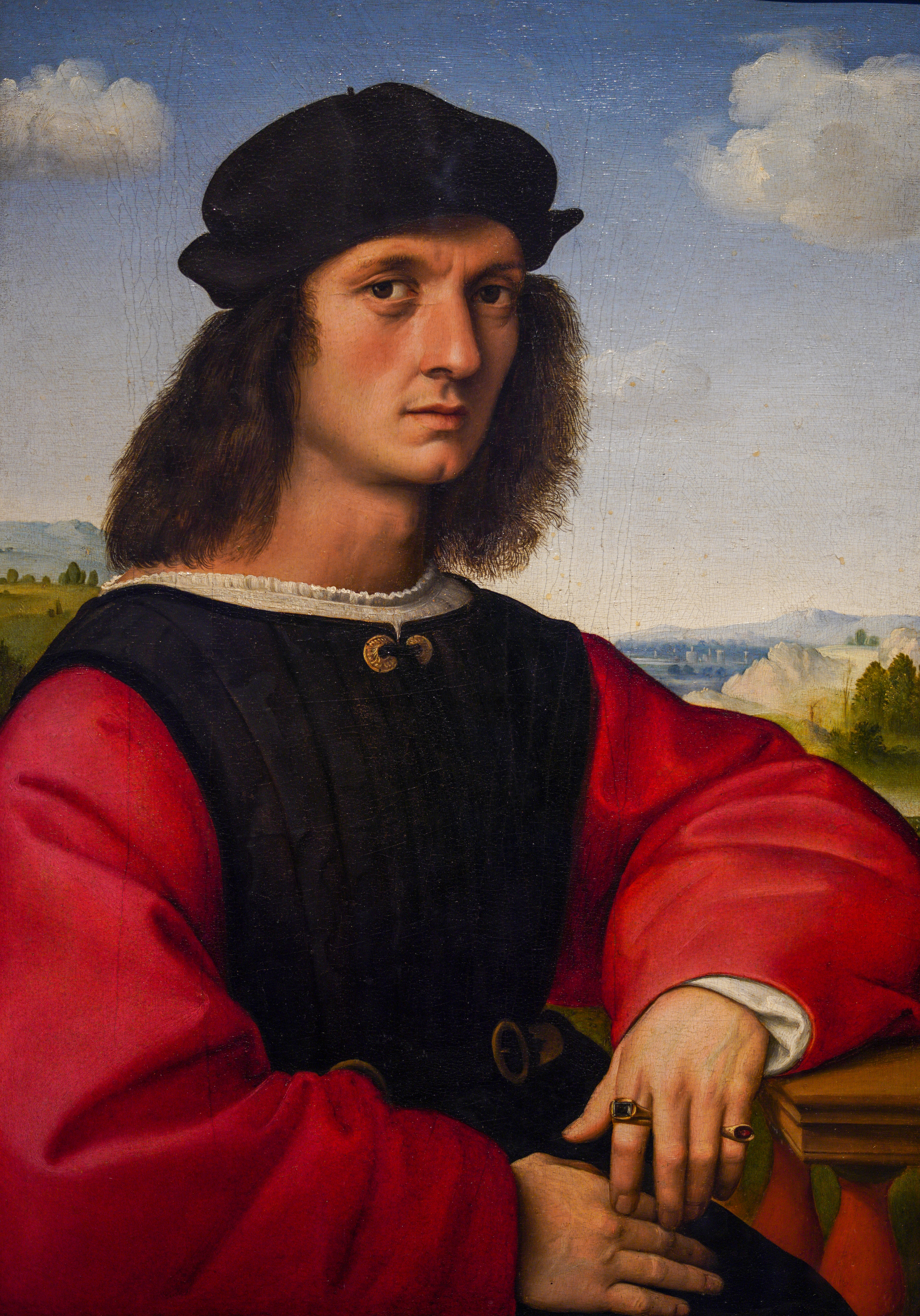
- Artist: Raphael
- Year: c. 1506
- Type: Oil on wood
- Dimensions: 63 cm × 45 cm (25 in × 18 in)
- Location: Uffizi; Florence

The Portrait of Agnolo Doni is an oil painting on wood by Italian Renaissance master Raphael, executed c. 1506. It is now in the Uffizi in Florence.

== Story ==
The portrait is one of a pair that depict a recently married merchant and his wife. Agnolo Doni married Maddalena Strozzi in 1503, but Raphael's portraits were probably executed in 1506, the period in which the painter studied the art of Leonardo da Vinci most closely. The composition of the portraits resembles that of the Mona Lisa: the figures are presented in the same way in respect to the picture plane, and their hands, like those of the Mona Lisa, are placed on top of one another. But the low horizon of the landscape background permits a careful assessment of the human figure by providing a uniform light which defines surfaces and volumes. This relationship between landscape and figure presents a clear contrast to the striking settings of Leonardo, which communicate the threatening presence of nature.

But the most notable characteristic that distinguishes these portraits from those of Leonardo is the overall sense of serenity which even the close attention to the materials of clothes and jewels (which draw one's attention to the couple's wealth) is unable to attenuate. Every element - even those of secondary importance - works together to create a precise balance.

These works, linked not only by the kinship of the subjects, but also by their evident stylistic homogeneity, mark the beginning of Raphael's artistic maturity.

== See also ==
- List of paintings by Raphael
- Portrait of Maddalena Doni
