= Giuseppe Benedetto Cottolengo =

Italian Catholic saint (1786–1842)

Saint Giuseppe Benedetto Cottolengo
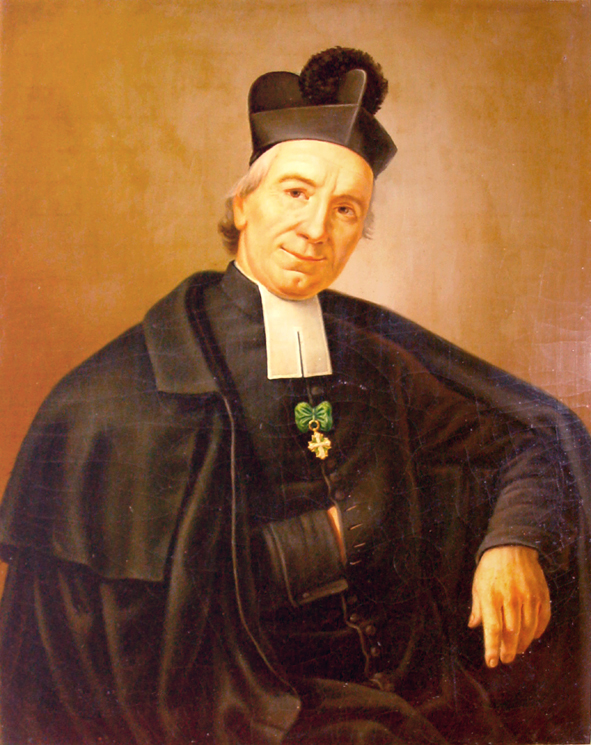
- Portrait by his brother, Agostino

Confessor
- Born: 3 May 1786; Bra, Kingdom of Sardinia (now in the Province of Cuneo, Piedmont, Italy)
- Died: 30 April 1842 (aged 55); Chieri, Kingdom of Sardinia (now in the Metropolitan City of Turin, Piedmont, Italy)
- Venerated in: Catholic Church
- Beatified: 29 April 1917, Rome by Pope Benedict XV
- Canonized: 19 March 1934, Rome by Pope Pius XI
- Feast: 30 April

Giuseppe Benedetto Cottolengo or Joseph Benedict Cottolengo (3 May 1786 – 30 April 1842) was the founder of the Little House of Divine Providence and is a saint of the Roman Catholic Church.

== Early life ==
St Joseph of Cottolengo was born on 3 May 1786, into a middle-class family, in Bra, then part of the Kingdom of Sardinia. The eldest of twelve children (six of whom died in infancy), on 2 October 1802, he became a Franciscan Tertiary. In 1805, he entered the seminary at Asti. Two years later, it was closed, and he was forced to continue his studies at home. Cottolengo was ordained a priest on 8 June 1811.

Assigned as a curate to Corneliano D'Alba, he completed his doctorate in theology in Turin, and in 1818 was accepted as a canon of the Basilica of Corpus Domini in Turin. Cottolengo donated all his gifts, donations, fees for preaching, and Mass stipends to the poor.

== Charitable work ==
At the time, Turin was still recovering from the French occupation and under the pressure of intense immigration from the countryside, which caused serious social problems and poverty. The city was rife with pauperism and beggary, illiteracy and recurrent epidemics, numerous illegitimate births and high infant mortality. At the age of forty-one, after reading the life of Vincent de Paul, he came to understand that his true vocation was that of charity.

At this time Cottolengo attended to a family travelling from Lyons to Milan. The pregnant mother was ill and was not accepted at the Maggiore Hospital because she had tuberculosis. Neither could she go to the maternity hospital because she was ill with fever, and the regulations proscribed admitting anyone who might be infectious. Cottolengo gave the mother the last rite and baptized her child in the Catholic Church before it died.

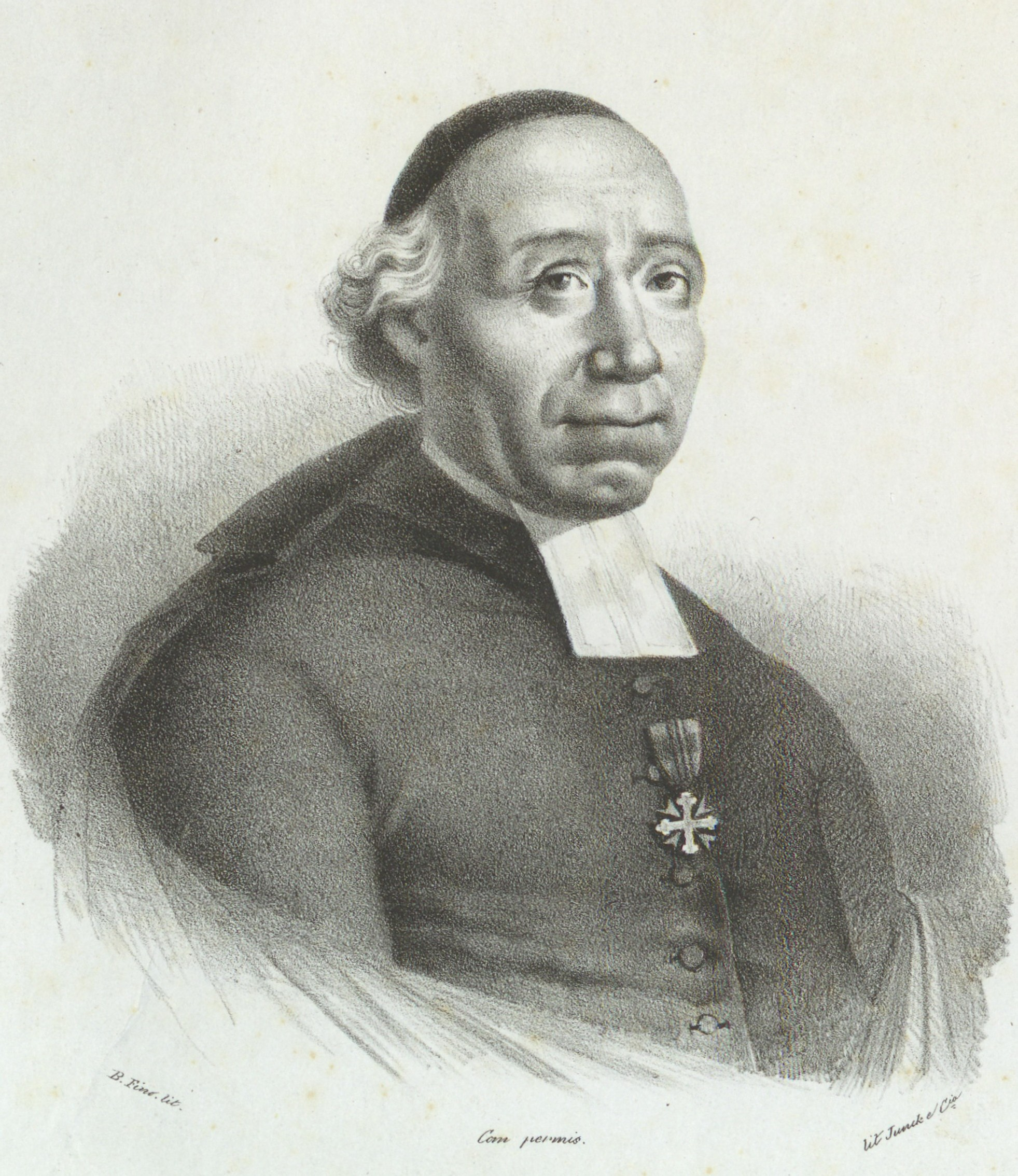
Ritratto di Giuseppe Cottolengo, 1826

Affected by the scene and the cries of her surviving children, Cottolengo went and sold everything he owned, including his cloak, and rented two rooms. He began his new work on 17 January 1828, offering free accommodation to an elderly paralytic Before long the premises turned into a hospitality center for people who were not accepted in hospitals. He came to be assisted by Doctor Lorenzo Granetti, pharmacist Paul Royal Anglesio and twelve "Ladies of Charity", under the direction of the rich widow Marianna Nasi, who visited the sick.

When cholera broke out in 1831, the small hospital was closed by the authorities as a precaution for fear of contagion. Cottolengo then bought a house in Valdocco, on the outskirts of the city, and relocated there with two nuns and a patient suffering from cancer. This was the beginning of the Little House of Divine Providence. Due to the generosity of a number of benefactors, especially the Cavalier Ferrero, he was soon able to establish an orphanage.

He also founded monasteries, convents, communities of priests, communities of brothers, and organised groups of lay volunteers. His legacy of charity stands today at the heart of Turin city as a sign of what it means to love and serve others in an evangelical way.

== Death ==
Don Cottolengo contracted typhoid while assisting his patients and died in Chieri on 30 April 1842. April 30 is also his feast day.

== Legacy ==
The institution that Cottolengo founded, the Little House of Divine Providence, or colloquially the "Cottolengo", still exists in Turin. The Cottolengo religious community includes Fathers, Sisters, and Brothers who still work together in activities focused on communicating God's love for the poorest. They operate facilities in Ecuador, India, Italy, Kenya, Switzerland, Tanzania, and the United States.

Cottolengo was beatified by Pope Benedict XV in 1917, and was canonized by Pope Pius XI in 1934. His feast day is celebrated on 30 April. Cottolengo is invoked against infectious diseases. He is also invoked against cirrhosis and other liver diseases, due to a miracle attributed to him where he appeared in a dream to a nun who then miraculously recovered from cirrhosis.

Several other places are named for him. The parish of Saint Joseph Benedict Cottolengo is located in Grosseto, Italy. There is a Via San Giuseppe Benedetto Cottolengo in Pisa. One of the most important charity institutions in Central Brazil is the Sao Jose Bento Cotollengo Institute, in Trindade, Goiás.

Joseph Benedict Cottolengo was listed among the saints of charity by Pope Benedict XVI in his 2005 encyclical Deus caritas est.

St. Joseph is a character in Bruce Marshall's 1960 novel The Divided Lady. In the 2006 Italian film Una cosa in mente. Giuseppe Benedetto Cottolengo ("One thing in mind: Giuseppe Benedetto Cottolengo"), Cottolengo is played by Massimo Wertmüller.
