= Agostino Cottolengo =

Italian painter (1794–1853)

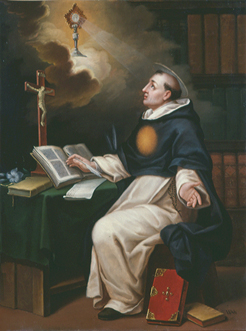
Portrait of St. Thomas Aquinas (1846)

Agostino Cottolengo (22 October 1794 – 8 April 1853) was an Italian painter.

== Biography ==
He was born in Bra, the younger brother of Giuseppe Benedetto Cottolengo. With vocation for design, In 1810, he enrolled in the Accademia Albertina of Turin. He participated in some of the revolutionary upheavals of 1821. After a stay in Turin, he returned to Bra, where he established an art school.

He painted for the churches of Bra and surroundings. From 1832 to 1834, he completed four canvases depicting the Life of St John the Baptist for the church of the Battuti Neri (Black Hoods). He painted a large oval Martyrdom of St Andrew for the church of Sant’Andrea; now found in the Santuario Nuovo della Madonna dei Fiori. He painted a Blessed Sebastiano Valfrè surrounded by the poor and a Sant’Antonio Abate for the parish church of San Giovanni. He painted a large oval canvas depicting the Risen Christ for the church of the Battuti Bianchi (White Hoods).

In 1853 he painted a St Roch for the church of the same name, as well as works for other churches and chapels in the Province of Cuneo. His works are traditional devotional work. His portraits show more realism.
