= Manchester Madonna =

Unfinished painting attributed to Michelangelo

Madonna and Child with St John and Angels
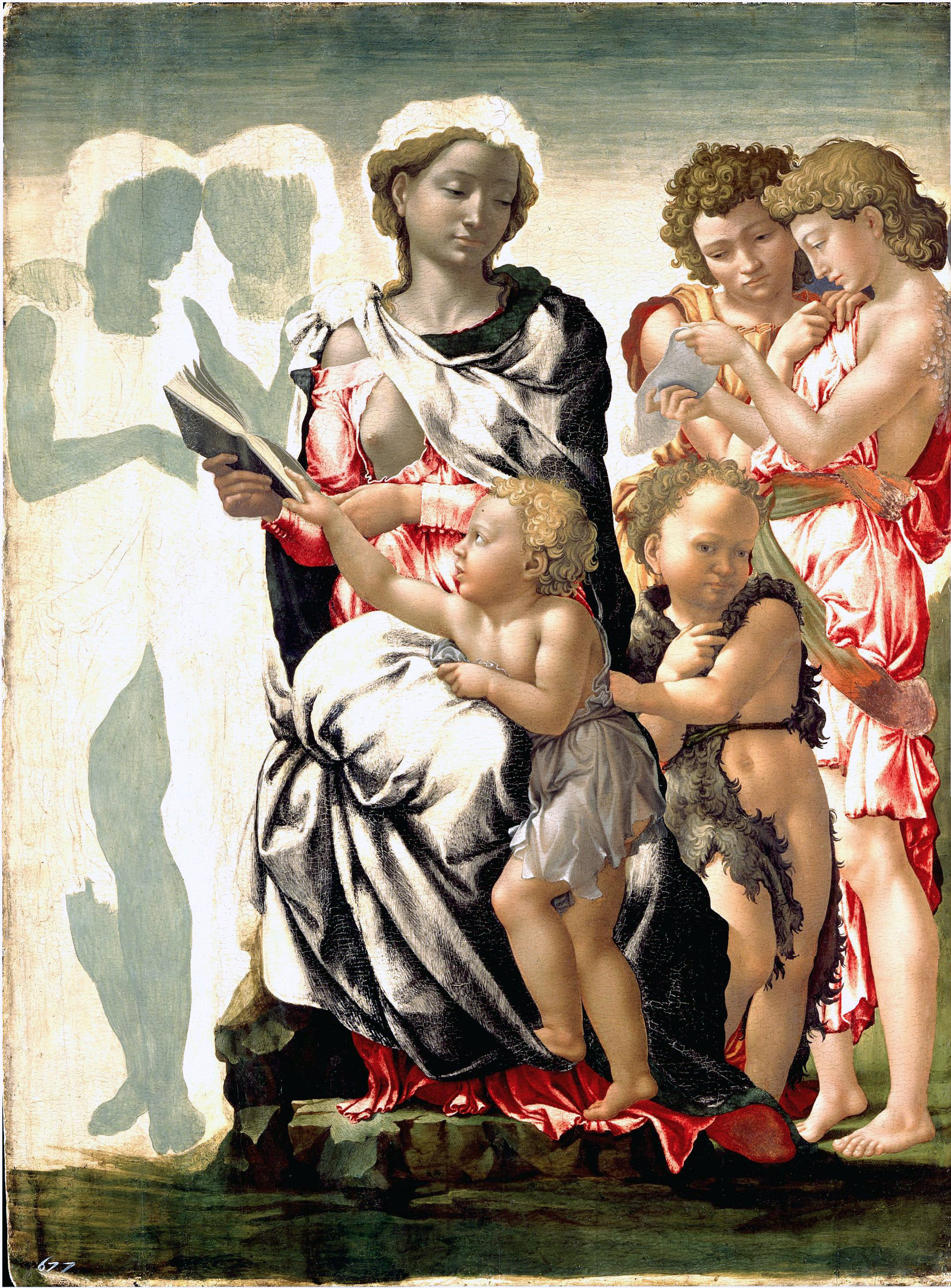
- Artist: Michelangelo
- Year: c. 1497
- Medium: Tempera on panel
- Dimensions: 105 cm × 76 cm (41 in × 30 in)
- Location: National Gallery, London

The Madonna and Child with St John and Angels (c. 1497), also known as The Manchester Madonna, is an unfinished painting in the National Gallery, London, attributed to Michelangelo. It is one of three surviving panel paintings attributed to the artist and has been dated to his first period in Rome. The work first came to public attention in the Art Treasures Exhibition in Manchester in 1857, hence the title the "Manchester Madonna". Attribution of the painting to Michelangelo was in doubt for much of the nineteenth and twentieth centuries, but now most scholars are in agreement.

Like other Renaissance paintings of the Madonna and Child that include John the Baptist, the subject arises from a non-Biblical tradition that the Virgin Mary and the Child Jesus met Christ's cousin, St John the Baptist, on the Holy Family's Flight into Egypt. The Virgin is depicted with one breast bared, as if she has recently been suckling her infant son, which recalls the theme of the Virgin breastfeeding which was common in medieval painting. In her hands is a book (traditionally Isaiah chapter 53) which she attempts to hold away from her son, the contents of which probably foretell his future sacrifice and his taking to himself the evil of the world. She looks over her left shoulder to a scroll being read by a pair of angels, which is likely to read Ecce Agnus Dei ("Behold the Lamb of God"), usually an attribute of John the Baptist.

The figures are arranged as if in a frieze, revealing Michelangelo's sculptor's mindset. The frieze becomes more convex at its centre, with the figures of Virgin and Child, as in the later Pitti Tondo. Another similarity to relief sculpture is in the plain background: rather than the landscapes more common for exterior settings, Michelangelo has simply painted an expanse of sky. He also eschewes the richly decorated throne typical of sacra conversazione altarpieces, and de-emphasises the angels' wings.

Many areas of the painting are in a preliminary state. The black of the Virgin's robe was meant to be overpainted with the rich blue pigment, lapis lazuli, and the angels on the left are indicated only by the green underpaint used for flesh tones in a kind of non finito.

== Attribution ==
The completed angel nearest the Virgin is noted as being similar to a sketch the young Michelangelo made while he was apprenticed to Domenico Ghirlandaio.

== See also ==
- List of works by Michelangelo
