= Palmer (surname) =

- Pronunciation: UK: /ˈpɑːmər/ US: /ˈpɑːlmər/
- Language: English

Origin
- Language: Old French
- Origin: palmier
- Meaning: 'palm bearer', 'pilgrim'

Other names
- See also: Palmer (given name)

Palmer is an English surname, probably from the Anglo-Norman nickname Palmer(e), variant form of the (Old) French name Palmier, Paulmier (Modern French surnames Paulmier, Paumier). They mean "pilgrim" and derive from the palm branch which was a token of a Christian pilgrimage to the Holy Land.

== Notable people with the surname "Palmer" ==
=== A ===
- A. Laurie Palmer, American artist
- A. Mitchell Palmer, (1872–1936), American politician
- A. N. Palmer (1860–1927), American inventor
- Abbie Palmer (born 1997), New Zealand squash player
- Abiah W. Palmer (1835–1881), American politician
- Abraham Palmer, American geneticist
- Abraham J. Palmer (1847–1922), American physician
- Abram Smythe Palmer (1844–1917), Irish lecturer
- Acalus Lockwood Palmer (1820–1899), Canadian politician
- Ada Palmer (born 1981), American historian
- Adele Palmer (1915–2008), American costume designer
- Adrian Palmer (1951–2023), Scottish politician
- Aiden Palmer (born 1987), English footballer
- Aimee Palmer (born 2000), English footballer
- Alan Palmer (1926–2022), British writer
- Alby Palmer (1885–1962), Australian rules footballer
- Alex Palmer (born 1996), English footballer
- Alexander Palmer (Australian politician) (1825–1901), Australian politician
- Alf Palmer (1891–1981), Australian aboriginal
- Alisa Palmer, Canadian theatre director
- Alison Palmer (born 1931), American priest and diplomat
- Allison R. Palmer (1927–2022), American paleontologist
- Amanda Palmer (born 1976), American musician
- Amanda Palmer (film executive) (born 1976), Australian film executive
- Ambrose Palmer (1910–1990), Australian rules footballer
- Amy Palmer (born 1975), American hammer thrower
- Anders Palmér (born 1960), Swedish footballer
- Andre Francis Palmer, Trinidadian-American professor
- Andrew Palmer (disambiguation page)
- Andy Palmer (born 1963), English engineer and businessman
- Angela Palmer, Scottish artist
- Àngels Cardona Palmer (born 1951), Spanish writer
- Anna Palmer (born 1982), American journalist
- Anna Campbell Palmer (1854–1928), American author
- Anne Palmer (cricketer) (1915–2006), Australian cricketer
- Ash Palmer (born 1992), English footballer
- Archdale Palmer (1865–1950), British tennis player
- Archdale Palmer (MP) (1661–1732), British politician
- Archie Palmer (1896–1985), American academic administrator
- Arnold Palmer (1929–2016), American golfer
- Ashlee Palmer (born 1986), American football player
- Ashley Palmer (actress) (born 1978), American actress
- Audrey Palmer (1932–2007), Zimbabwean field hockey player
- Austin Norman Palmer (1860–1927), American author

=== B ===
- Barbara Palmer (1640–1709), English social figure
- Barbara Jo Palmer (born 1949), American sports advocate
- Barclay Palmer (1932–2020), British shot putter
- Bascom H. Palmer (??–1916), American politician
- Beaufort Palmer (1919–2011), Australian aviator
- Becchara Palmer (born 1988), Australian beach volleyball player
- Bee Palmer (1894–1967), American singer
- Bell Elliott Palmer (1873–1947), American writer
- Ben Palmer (born 1976), British television director
- Benjamin Morgan Palmer (1818–1902), American minister
- Beriah Palmer (1740–1812), American politician
- Bernard Palmer (1914–1998), American author
- Bert Palmer (1901–1932), New Zealand rugby union footballer
- Bertha Palmer (1849–1918), American businesswoman
- Beth Palmer (1952–2019), American bridge player
- Betsy Palmer (1926–2015), American actress
- Billy Palmer (1888–1957), English footballer
- Billy Palmer (baseball), American baseball player
- B. J. Palmer (1882–1961), American chiropractor
- Blanca Palmer (born 1999), Spanish taekwondo athlete
- Bo Palmer (born 1990), Canadian football player
- Boris Palmer (born 1972), German politician
- Brad Palmer (born 1961), Canadian ice hockey player
- Bradley Palmer (1866–1946), American attorney
- Briar Palmer (born 1995), New Zealand footballer
- Brittney Palmer (born 1987), American model and ring girl
- Bryan Palmer (1899–1990), Australian rugby union footballer
- Bud Palmer (1921–2013), American basketball player
- Byron Palmer (1920–2009), American actor

=== C ===
- Caitriona Palmer (born 1972), Irish journalist
- Calvin Palmer (1940–2014), English footballer
- Camilla Palmer, British solicitor
- Cammy Palmer (born 2000), Northern Irish footballer
- Campbell Palmer (1936–2007), Canadian boxer
- Carl Palmer (born 1950), English musician
- Carlton Palmer (born 1965), English footballer
- Carlton Palmer (American football) (1895–??), American athletic coach
- Carol Palmer, British anthropologist
- Caroline Palmer, Canadian-American neuroscientist
- Carson Palmer (born 1979), American football player
- Cecil Palmer (1873–1915), English cricketer
- Charlotte Palmer (1762–1834), English teacher
- Christene Palmer, Australian actress
- Christopher Palmer (1946–1995), English composer
- Clare Palmer (born 1967), British philosopher
- Clarence Palmer (born 1943), American musician
- Clayton Palmer (1885–1956), English cricketer
- Clif Palmer (born 1937), Australian rules footballer
- Clifford Palmer, New Zealand academic administrator
- Clive Palmer (born 1954), Australian mining magnate
- Clive Palmer (musician) (1943–2014), British musician
- Clyde Palmer (1923–2005), American racing driver
- Cole Palmer (born 2002), English footballer
- Colin A. Palmer (1944–2019), Jamaican-American historian
- Corky Palmer (1954–2022), American baseball coach
- Coral Palmer (born 1942), New Zealand netball player
- Corliss Palmer (1899–1952), American actress
- Cornelius S. Palmer (1844–1932), American soldier, lawyer, and judge
- C. Phil Palmer, British palaeontologist
- Crawford Palmer (born 1970), French-American basketball player
- Curtis Palmer (born 1977), New Zealand wheelchair rugby footballer
- Cyril Palmer (1930–2013), Jamaican writer
- Cyrus M. Palmer (1887–1959), American politician

=== D ===
- Davinia Palmer, Welsh television presenter
- Dean Palmer (born 1968), American baseball player
- Debbie Palmer (1951–??), American disappeared child
- Debbie Palmer (speed skater) (born 1973), British speed skater
- Dee Palmer (1937–2026), British musician
- Deidre Palmer (born 1955/1956), Australian theologian
- Del Palmer, English singer-songwriter
- Derrell Palmer (1922–2009), American football player
- Derrick Palmer (born 1988/1989), American labor organizer
- Des Palmer (born 1931), Welsh footballer
- Diana Palmer (author) (born 1946), American author
- Dixeth Palmer (born 1968), Jamaican cricketer
- Dominique Palmer (born 1999), British activist
- Doris Palmer (1898–1993), New Zealand activist
- Dorothea Palmer (1908–1992), English-Canadian criminal
- Dorothy Binney Palmer (1888–1982), American explorer
- Doug Palmer (1930–1992), Australian rules footballer
- Douglas Palmer (born 1951), American politician

=== E ===
- Earl Palmer (1924–2008), American drummer
- Earl F. Palmer (1931–2023), American minister
- E. Clephan Palmer (1883–1954), British author
- Edmund Palmer (1781–1834), English naval officer
- Eduardo González Pálmer (1934–2022), Mexican footballer
- Edwin Palmer (1824–1895), English churchman
- Edwin Palmer (cricketer) (1869–1917), New Zealand cricketer
- Edwina Palmer (born 1955), English professor
- Eleanor Palmer (philanthropist) (??–1558), English philanthropist
- Eleanor A. Palmer (1889–1971), the real name of American actress Belle Adair
- Lady Eleanor Palmer (1718/20–1818), Irish Catholic heiress
- Elihu Palmer (1794–1806), American minister
- Elwin Palmer (1852–1906), British colonial administrator
- Ely Palmer (1887–1977), American diplomat
- Emily Palmer (??–1929), British politician
- Ephraim Laurence Palmer (1888–1970), American conservationist
- Erastus Dow Palmer (1817–1904), American sculptor
- Errol Palmer (born 1945), American basketball player
- Eustace Palmer, Sierra Leonian professor
- Eve Palmer (1916–1998), South African writer
- Eve Palmer (actress), New Zealand actress
- Eugene K. Palmer (born 1939) American fugitive
- Eugene Oliver Palmer (born 1955) Jamaican-born British artist

=== F ===
- Fanny Purdy Palmer (1839–1923), American author
- Farah Palmer (born 1972), New Zealand rugby union footballer
- Felicity Palmer (born 1944), English operatic soprano
- Fernando Garfella Palmer (1989–2020), Spanish filmmaker
- Florence Margaret Spencer Palmer (1900–1987), British composer
- Ford Palmer (born 1990), American runner
- Frank R. Palmer (1922–2019), British linguist
- Freddie Palmer (1921–2020), French jockey
- Fredrikke Palmer (1860–1947), Norwegian-American illustrator
- Frida Palmer (1905–1966), Swedish astronomer
- F. W. J. Palmer (1864–1947), British engineer

=== G ===
- Gail Palmer (born 1955), American film director
- Garrick Palmer (1933–2023), English painter, wood engraver, photographer and teacher
- Gerry Palmer (1930–1984), Canadian football player
- Gladys L. Palmer (1895–1967), American statistician
- Gladys Milton Palmer (1884–1952), British film producer
- Godfrey Palmer (politician) (1878–1933), English politician
- Gordon Palmer (1918–1989), English aristocrat
- Grace Palmer (born 1994), New Zealand actress
- Graham Palmer (1921–1994), British canoeist
- Greg Palmer (1947–2009), American television producer
- Greg Palmer (Australian filmmaker) (1909–??), Australian filmmaker
- Gregg Palmer (1927–2015), American actor
- Gregory V. Palmer (born 1954), American bishop
- Griffen Palmer (born 1995), Canadian singer and songwriter

=== H ===
- Haiden Palmer (born 1991), American basketball player
- Hank Palmer (born 1985), Canadian sprinter
- Hannah Borden Palmer (1843–1940), American activist and reformer
- Hans Palmer (1933–2023), American economist
- Harlan G. Palmer (1885–1956), American politician and newspaper publisher
- Harold E. Palmer (1877–1949), English linguist and phonetician
- Harrison Palmer (born 1996), English cricketer
- Harvard "Pete" Palmer Jr., American lobbyist
- Hayley Palmer (born 1989), New Zealand swimmer
- Helene Palmer (1928–2011), English actress
- Hellen Palmer (1920 –1977), One of the pen names of the female Brazilian writer and journalist Clarice Lispector
- Hollie Palmer (born 2001), Australian footballer
- Holly Palmer (born 1971), American singer-songwriter
- Horace W. Palmer (1878–1953), American politician
- Howard Palmer (1907–1969), Canadian curler
- Howard Palmer (sailor) (born 1946), Barbadian sailor
- Hubbel Palmer (born 1977), American screenwriter

=== I ===
- Innis N. Palmer (1824–1900), American army general

=== J ===
- Jackson Palmer (1867–1919), American politician
- Jahkoy Palmer (born 1994), Canadian rapper
- Jamie Palmer (born 1985), English footballer
- Jane Palmer (born 1946), British author
- Jared Palmer (born 1971), American tennis player
- Jarod Palmer (born 1986), American ice hockey player
- Jeffrey D. Palmer, American professor
- Jemma Palmer (born 1986), American model
- Jenny Palmer (born 1959), Northern Irish politician
- Jermaine Palmer (born 1986), English footballer
- Jerry Palmer (born 1943), American automotive designer
- Jesse Palmer (born 1978), Canadian football player
- Jesse Palmer (Australian footballer) (born 1996), Australian rules footballer
- Jessica Palmer (born 1953), American author
- Jessica Palmer (academic) (born 1980), New Zealand academic and lawyer
- Jim Palmer (born 1945), American baseball player
- Jim Palmer (basketball) (1933–2013), American basketball player
- Jimmy Palmer (footballer) (1877–1947), Australian rules footballer
- J. Lynn Palmer, American statistician
- Jo Palmer (born 1971), Australian politician
- Jock Palmer (1896–1964), Canadian soldier
- Joel Palmer (1810–1881), Canadian-American pioneer and politician
- Joey Palmer (1859–1910), Australian cricketer
- John Palmer (1950-2015), British Criminal
- Johnny Palmer (1918–2006), American golfer
- Johnny Ace Palmer (born 1960), American magician
- Jolyon Palmer (born 1991), British racing driver
- Jonathan Palmer (born 1956), British racing driver
- Jonathan Palmer (American football) (born 1983), American football player
- Jordan Palmer (born 1984), American football player
- Jordan Palmer (social activist), American politician and activist
- Josh Palmer (born 1999), Canadian-American football player
- Joshua Palmer (born 1991), Australian swimmer
- Judith Palmer, American composer
- Julia Palmer (??–1673), English poet
- Julie Palmer, New Zealand professor
- Juliet Palmer (born 1967), New Zealand composer
- Julins Palmer (??–1556), English martyr
- Julius A. Palmer Jr. (1840–1899), American historian
- June Palmer (1940–2004), British model

=== K ===
- Karl-Erik Palmér (1929–2015), Swedish footballer
- Kasey Palmer (born 1996), English footballer
- Kate Palmer, Australian sports administrator
- Katherine Van Winkle Palmer (1895–1982), American paleontologist
- Keegan Palmer (born 2003), Australian skateboarder
- Keith Palmer, numerous individuals
- Keke Palmer (born 1993), American actress
- Kelvin Palmer (born 1990), American football player
- Ken Palmer (born 1937), British cricketer and cricket umpire
- Kiki Palmer (1907–1949), Italian actress
- King Palmer (1913–1999), English composer
- Kirk Palmer (born 1986), Australian swimmer
- Krysta Palmer (born 1992), American diver
- Kye Palmer (born 1962), American musician
- Kylie Palmer (born 1990), Australian swimmer

=== L ===
- Lance Palmer (born 1987), American mixed martial artist
- Larry Leon Palmer (1949–2021), American diplomat
- Lawrence Palmer (born 1938), American ice hockey player
- Lee Palmer (born 1970), English footballer
- Leland Palmer (actress) (born 1941), American actress
- Leon Palmer, American baseball player
- Leonard Robert Palmer (1906–1984), British philologist
- Les Palmer (American football) (1923–2006), American football player
- Les Palmer (footballer, born 1923) (1923–2002), English footballer
- Leslie Palmer (water polo) (1910–1997), British water polo player
- Leslie "Teacher" Palmer (born 1943), Trinidadian community activist
- Lew Palmer (1875–1945), American football player
- Liam Palmer (born 1991), English footballer
- Lilli Palmer (1914–1986), German-American actress
- Linwood E. Palmer Jr. (1921–2008), American politician
- Lizzie Pitts Merrill Palmer (1838–1916), American philanthropist
- Louis Palmer (born 1971), Swiss pioneer
- Lovel Palmer (born 1984), Jamaican footballer
- Lowell Palmer (born 1947), American baseball player
- Lu Palmer (1922–2004), American reporter
- Lucian H. Palmer (1855–1923), American politician
- Luther Palmer (born 1949), American football player
- Lynwood Palmer (1868–1941), English painter

=== M ===
- Mabel Palmer (1876–1958), British-American suffragist
- Mabel Heath Palmer (1885–1949), American chiropractor
- Marcus Palmer (born 1988), English footballer
- Margaret A. Palmer, American professor
- Margaretta Palmer (1862–1924), American astronomer
- Marguerite Palmer (1886–??), Irish activist
- Maria Palmer (1917–1981), Austrian-American actress
- Marilyn Palmer (born 1943), British historian
- Marion Palmer (born 1953), Norwegian author
- Martha Palmer, American computer scientist
- Martin Palmer (born 1953), English theologian
- Martin B. Palmer (1812–1893), Canadian politician
- Mary Palmer (1716–1794), British author
- Mary Palmer (born 1750) (1750–1820), British gentry
- Maud Palmer (1858–1950), British activist
- Max Palmer (1927–1984), American actor and wrestler
- Melissa Palmer (born 1958), American hepatologist
- Merle F. Palmer (1919–1990), American politician
- Miguel Palmer (1942–2021), Mexican actor
- Minnie Palmer (1857–1936), American actress
- Miriam Augusta Palmer (1878–1977), American zoologist
- Mitch Palmer (born 1973), American football player
- Mixie Palmer (1927–2022), Irish Gaelic footballer
- Monroe Palmer (born 1938), British politician

=== N ===
- N. A. Palmer (born 1956), British musician
- Nate Palmer (born 1989), American football player
- Nathan Palmer (born 1989), American football player
- Nathaniel Palmer (1799–1877), American sailor
- Ned Palmer, British cheesemonger
- Nettie Palmer (1885–1964), Australian literary figure
- Nick Palmer (born 1950), British politician
- Nick Palmer (rugby union) (born 1991), Australian rugby union footballer
- Nigel F. Palmer (1946–2022), British professor
- Noah Palmer (born 1983), American soccer player
- Noel Palmer (1887–1961), British politician

=== O ===
- Olle Palmer (born 1955), Swedish tennis player
- Ollie Palmer (born 1992), English footballer
- Orio Palmer (1956–2001), American fireman

=== P ===
- Paige Palmer (1916–2009), American fitness expert
- Pamela Palmer, American author
- Parker Palmer (born 1939), American author
- Patsy Palmer (born 1972), English actress
- Pauline Palmer (1867–1938), American artist
- Pedlar Palmer (1876–1949), English boxer
- Peggy Palmer (born 1945), American politician
- Pete Palmer (born 1938), American statistician
- Phil Palmer (born 1952), British guitarist
- Phoebe Palmer (1807–1874), American evangelist
- Potter Palmer (1826–1902), American businessman and real estate developer

=== R ===
- Randy Palmer (born 1975), American football player
- R. E. A. Palmer (1933–2006), American historian
- Reginald Palmer (1923–2016), Grenadian politician
- Renzo Palmer (1930–1988), Italian actor
- Rex Palmer (1896–1972), English broadcaster
- Rhys Palmer (born 1989), Australian rules footballer
- Rhys Palmer (cricketer) (born 1996), Jerseyian cricketer
- Richmond Palmer (1877–1958), English barrister
- Rissi Palmer (born 1981), American singer-songwriter
- R. J. Palmer (born 1970), American politician
- Rodney Palmer (1907–1987), English cricketer and soldier
- Romal Palmer (born 1998), English footballer
- Romie J. Palmer (1921–2014), American politician and jurist
- Ronald D. Palmer (1932–2014), American diplomat
- Ronnie Palmer (born 1986), American football player
- Rory Palmer (born 1981), English politician
- Rosina Palmer (1844–1932), Australian singer
- Roundell Palmer (1812–1895), British politician
- Rufus Palmer (1828–1873), Canadian physician
- Ruth Palmer, British violinist

=== S ===
- Santiago R. Palmer (1844–1906), Puerto Rican politician
- Scot Palmer (1937–2022), Australian sports journalist
- Sean Palmer (born 1973), American actor
- Septimus Palmer (1858–1935), Australian cricketer
- Shaun Palmer (born 1968), American snowboarder
- Shelly Palmer, American marketing consultant
- Simon Palmer, English disc jockey
- Singleton Palmer (1912–1993), American musician
- Sophia French Palmer (1853–1920), American nurse
- Spencer J. Palmer (1927–2000), American religious figure
- Stanley Palmer, American historian
- Stanley Palmer (artist) (born 1936), New Zealand artist
- Stephanie Palmer, American consultant
- Sterling Palmer (born 1971), American football player
- Sue Palmer (born 1948), Scottish schoolteacher
- Suetonia Palmer, New Zealand academic
- Susan J. Palmer (born 1946), Canadian sociologist
- Sydney Bacon Palmer (1890–1954), English colonial administrator

=== T ===
- Tejhaun Palmer (born 2000), American football player
- Teresa Palmer (born 1986), American actress
- Tex Palmer (1904–1982), American actor
- Theodore Sherman Palmer (1868–1955), American zoologist
- Tobais Palmer (born 1990), American football player
- Tracy Palmer (born 1967), English microbiologist
- Trayvon Palmer (born 1994), American basketball player
- Trey Palmer (born 2001), American football player
- Tyler Palmer (born 1950), American alpine skier

=== V ===
- Valentine Palmer (1935–2022), British voice coach
- Vance Palmer (1885–1959), Australian author
- Vanice Palmer (born 1993), American singer known professionally as Cookiee Kawaii
- Vernon Valentine Palmer, American legal scholar
- Victoria Palmer (born 1945), American tennis player
- Violet Palmer (born 1964), American basketball referee
- Virginia E. Palmer (born 1963), American diplomat

=== W ===
- Wendy Palmer (born 1974), American basketball player
- Willard Palmer (1917–1996), American musician
- Williston B. Palmer (1899–1973), American general
- Winthrop Palmer (1906–1970), American ice hockey player

=== Z ===
- Zirl A. Palmer (1920–1982), American businessman
- Zoe Palmer (1903–1983), British actress
- Zoie Palmer, Canadian actress

== Disambiguation pages ==
=== A ===
- Albert Palmer (disambiguation)
- Alfred Palmer (disambiguation)
- Alice Palmer (disambiguation)
- Andrew Palmer (disambiguation)
- Anthony Palmer (disambiguation)
- Arthur Palmer (disambiguation)

=== B ===
- Barry Palmer (disambiguation)
- Brian Palmer (disambiguation)
- Bruce Palmer (disambiguation)

=== C ===
- Catherine Palmer (disambiguation)
- Charles Palmer (disambiguation)
- Chris Palmer (disambiguation)

=== D ===
- Daniel Palmer (disambiguation)
- David Palmer (disambiguation)
- Derek Palmer (disambiguation)
- Dick Palmer (disambiguation)
- Don Palmer (disambiguation)

=== E ===
- Eddie Palmer (disambiguation)
- Edward Palmer (disambiguation)
- Elizabeth Palmer (disambiguation)
- Eric Palmer (disambiguation)
- Ernest Palmer (disambiguation)
- Eugene Palmer (disambiguation)

=== F ===
- Francis Palmer (disambiguation)
- Frank Palmer (disambiguation)
- Frederick Palmer (disambiguation)

=== G ===
- Gary Palmer (disambiguation)
- Geoffrey Palmer (disambiguation)
- George Palmer (disambiguation)
- Gerald Palmer (disambiguation)
- Glenn Palmer (disambiguation)
- Grant Palmer (disambiguation)

=== H ===
- Harold Palmer (disambiguation)
- Harry Palmer (disambiguation)
- Helen Palmer (disambiguation)
- Henry Palmer (disambiguation)
- Herbert Palmer (disambiguation)

=== I ===
- Ian Palmer (disambiguation)

=== J ===
- Jack Palmer (disambiguation)
- James Palmer (disambiguation)
- Jason Palmer (disambiguation)
- John Palmer (disambiguation)
- Joseph Palmer (disambiguation)

=== K ===
- Keith Palmer (disambiguation)
- Kevin Palmer (disambiguation)

=== L ===
- Lillian Palmer (disambiguation)
- Lou Palmer (disambiguation)

=== M ===
- Mark Palmer (disambiguation)
- Matt Palmer (disambiguation)
- Michael Palmer (disambiguation)

=== N ===
- Norman Palmer (disambiguation)

=== P ===
- Patrick Palmer (disambiguation)
- Paul Palmer (disambiguation)
- Peter Palmer (disambiguation)
- Philip Palmer (disambiguation)

=== R ===
- Ralph Palmer (disambiguation)
- Ray Palmer (disambiguation)
- Richard Palmer (disambiguation)
- Rob Palmer (disambiguation)
- Robert Palmer (disambiguation)
- Roger Palmer (disambiguation)
- Roy Palmer (disambiguation)

=== S ===
- Samuel Palmer (disambiguation)
- Sandra Palmer (disambiguation)
- Sarah Palmer (disambiguation)
- Scott Palmer (disambiguation)
- Shirley Palmer (disambiguation)
- Stephen Palmer (disambiguation)
- Stuart Palmer (disambiguation)

=== T ===
- Terry Palmer (disambiguation)
- Thomas Palmer (disambiguation)
- Tim Palmer (disambiguation)
- Tony Palmer (disambiguation)

=== W ===
- Walter Palmer (disambiguation)
- William Palmer (disambiguation)

== Fictional characters ==
- Annie Palmer, a character on the soap opera EastEnders
- Cecil Gershwin Palmer, a character in Welcome to Night Vale
- Christine Palmer, a character from Marvel Comics and the Marvel Cinematic Universe
- Diana Palmer (The Phantom), a character in the comic series The Phantom
- Isabelle Palmer, American Girl character, "Girl of the Year" for 2014
- Laura Palmer, a character on the television series Twin Peaks
- Leland Palmer, a character on the television series Twin Peaks

== See also ==
- Attorney General Palmer (disambiguation), a disambiguation page for Attorney Generals surnamed "Palmer"
- Admiral Palmer (disambiguation), a disambiguation page for Admirals surnamed "Palmer"
- General Palmer (disambiguation), a disambiguation page for Generals surnamed "Palmer"
- Justice Palmer (disambiguation), a disambiguation page for Justices surnamed "Palmer"
- Senator Palmer (disambiguation), a disambiguation page for Senators surnamed "Palmer"
