= Catherine Palmer (disambiguation) =

Catherine Palmer is an author.

Catherine Palmer may also refer to:

- Catherine Palmer, character in Mercy (film)
- Catherine Palmer, see North Devon Council election, 2003

== See also ==
- Kate Palmer, netball player
- Katherine Van Winkle Palmer (1895-1982), paleontologist
- Katherine Palmer (abbess)
