= Frederick Palmer =

Frederick Palmer may refer to:

- Frederick Palmer (engineer) (1860–1934), British civil engineer
- Frederick Palmer (journalist) (1873–1958), American writer and war correspondent
- Frederick William Palmer (1891–1955), World War I Victoria Cross recipient
- Frederick Christian Palmer (1866–1941), photographer
- Frederick F. Palmer (1925–1992), U.S. Navy admiral
- Frederick John Palmer, English photographer
- F. W. J. Palmer (1864–1947), English civil engineer, structural engineer and surveyor
