= Steven Pressman (economist) =

American economist

- Born: New York City

Academic background
- Influences: John Maynard Keynes, John Kenneth Galbraith

Academic work
- Discipline: Post-Keynesian economics; poverty and the middle class
- School or tradition: Post Keynesian
- Notable ideas: The measurement and causes of poverty and the size of the middle class; application of Post Keynesian principles to microeconomic issues

Steven Pressman is an American economist. He is a former Professor of Economics and Finance at Monmouth University in West Long Branch, New Jersey. He has taught at the University of New Hampshire and Trinity College in Hartford, Connecticut.

He has served as co-editor of the Review of Political Economy since 1995, as Associate Editor and Book Review Editor of the Eastern Economic Journal since 1989, and a member of the Editorial Advisory Board of the journal Basic Income Studies since 2005.

He has been on the board of directors of the Eastern Economic Association from 1994 to the present, and since 1996 he has served as Treasurer of the group. In addition he has been a regular book reviewer for "Dollars and Sense" since 2010.

== Biography ==
Pressman is the elder son of Jeffrey and Phyllis Pressman. Pressman and his brother Alan, a bankruptcy attorney on Long Island, attended public school in Queens (New York) and graduated from Francis Lewis High School. Pressman's sister-in-law, Melissa Palmer, is a Hepatologist and researcher in the field of liver disease. Pressman attended Alfred University in upstate New York, where he received a B.A. in philosophy in 1973. He then attended Syracuse University and received a Master of Arts in philosophy in 1976. He went on to study economics at the New School, working with Robert Heilbroner, Edward J. Nell, David Gordon, and Vivian Walsh. He received his Ph.D. in 1983 for his work on Francois Quesnay's Tableau Économique, the first economic model.

== Work ==
He is known for his contributions to economics, particularly his work on poverty and the middle class, which documents that a thriving middle class and low rates of poverty require substantial redistributive efforts on the part of the government; his work applying the principles of Post Keynesian economics to microeconomic policy issues; his work on tax and redistribution policy and his work on the Tableau Économique.

== Poverty, the middle class, and income distribution ==
Pressman has published articles (with his colleague at Monmouth University, Robert Scott) arguing that poverty and inequality are greater than measured by government statistics because these measures exclude interest payments on consumer debt and these interest payments cannot be used to support current living standards. This work has estimated that there are more than 4 million debt poor in the United States. They have also estimated that the problem of inequality is worse than estimated by standard measures such as the Gini coefficient. They are currently seeking to identify the debt poor and to devise policies to aid the debt poor, who do not qualify for many government assistance programs that mainly go to households officially considered as poor.

Pressman has published several papers using the Luxembourg Income Study to examine poverty, the middle class and government redistribution throughout the world. These papers argue that one main reason poverty rates are so high in the United States is that government tax and government spending policies do little to help those with low earned incomes. In addition, the United States middle class is very small compared to other developed countries mainly because government tax and government spending policies fail to help middle class families.

Additionally, Pressman has published articles on income guarantees and edited a book on the notion of Basic Income Guarantees as a solution to poverty. This work argues that a guaranteed income would not have any major negative economic effects, such as creating great work disincentives, as long as the guarantees are kept to a minimal level. Moreover, this minimal level is greater than the current redistributive efforts in the United States, and something close to what other developed countries provide to their citizens.

Pressman has published articles on refundable tax credits for children as a solution to child poverty in the United States and as a way to support the middle class in the United States. This work argues that these tax credits could be financed by eliminating tax exemptions for children.

He has also published articles on women and poverty. This work argues that the feminization of poverty is due to more female-headed households in the United States and the lack of appropriate tax and spending programs to help female-headed households. Compared to other developed nations throughout the world who do much to help female-headed families, the poverty rate for U.S. female-headed families is much greater.

== Government tax and spending policy ==
As noted above, Pressman has published work advocating that government tax and spending policy is a main determinant of poverty and the size of the middle class in developed countries. He has then gone on to argue for more progressive fiscal policies to support poor and middle class households in the United States. He has also argued that these redistributive programs would not have many negative effects.

He has analyzed the U.S. Current Population Survey, and articulated a policy to eliminate tax deductions for children and convert them into a refundable tax credit. This would essentially give the United States a system of child or family allowances, similar to other developed nations throughout the world. Such a policy change would help low and moderate-income households at no additional cost. It would also greatly reduce child poverty in the U.S. and increase the size of the U.S. middle class.

Pressman has published articles articulating how state governments should deal with the dilemmas of taxing e-commerce, arguing that states need to move away from relying on regressive sales taxes and use more progressive forms of taxation.

Finally, Pressman has shown that there is little empirical evidence that government deficits crowd out consumption, business investment, or net exports. There is, however, good empirical evidence that, when used appropriately, fiscal policy is able to mitigate business cycles.

== Physiocracy and the history of economic thought ==
Pressman's work has sought to explain the Physiocratic model of the macro-economy (see Physiocracy), and to argue that the Tableau Économique is a consistent economic model. He has shown how this model can be used to deal with the contemporary economic problems such as the productivity slowdown and appropriate tax policy. Finally, he has shown how this model is consistent with the models of contemporary schools of thought such as Post-Keynesian economics.

His book, 50 Major Economists, 2nd ed. (Routledge, 2006) brings the ideas of key economists from the past to a more general audience.

== Other contributions ==
Pressman has written on financial frauds and their causes, including articles on specific frauds such as Charles Ponzi, Martin Frankel, and Health South. He has argued that naive optimism, a human character trait, is one reason that financial frauds are so prevalent. Another reason is herd behavior. Yet another reason is the lack of adequate government controls and insufficient checks and balances on firms and on individuals working for firms. Finally, human laziness comes into play – the failure of people to do the simple homework necessary to identify likely fraudulent activity.

Pressman has also written on economic methodology, arguing that the voting paradox cannot be resolved by claiming that voting is like clapping or applauding for a candidate. Strong empirical evidence that people engage in strategic voting, and important differences between voting and applause, make this resolution of the voting paradox inadequate.

Finally, Pressman has argued that Robert Nozick's position on the justice of government redistribution programs, which is put into concrete terms with his famous Wilt Chamberlain example, is badly flawed for four reasons – it ignores actual history, yet purports to be a historical theory of justice, it ignores empirical evidence on justice, it ignores the social nature of production and it ignores the future.

== Books ==
=== Written ===
- Fifty Major Economists, 1st ed. 1999. 2nd ed. 2006 3rd ed. 2013 (Routledge; 2006) ISBN 9780415134811
  - (Czech edition, Barrister & Principal, 2002) (Chinese edition, 2005) (Indonesian edition, forthcoming) (Italian edition, forthcoming)
- Quesnay's Tableau Economique: A Critique and Assessment (Augustus Kelley; 1994)
- Poverty in America: An Annotated Bibliography (University Press of America and Scarecrow Press; 1994) ISBN 9780810828339

=== Edited ===
- Alternative Theories of the State (Palgrave/Macmillan; 2006) ISBN 9781403999399
- Leading Contemporary Economists: Economics at the Cutting Edge,(edited volume, Routledge; 2009) ISBN 9780415775014
- Post Keynesian Macroeconomics: Essays in Honor of Ingrid Rima (Routledge; 2007; edited with Mathew Forstater and Gary Mongiovi) ISBN 9780415772310
- Empirical Post Keynesian Economics: Looking at the Real World (edited with Richard Holt) (M.E. Sharpe; 2006;
- The Economics and the Ethics of the Basic Income Guarantee (Ashgate; 2005; edited with Karl Wilderquist and Michael Lewis) ISBN 9780754641889
- A New Guide to Post Keynesian Economics (Routledge; 2001; edited with Richard Holt) ISBN 9780415229821
- Encyclopedia of Political Economy (Routledge; 1999; edited with Phil O'Hara, et al.) ISBN 9780415241861
- Economics and Its Discontents: Twentieth Century Dissenting Economists (Edward Elgar; 1998; edited with Richard Holt) ISBN 9781858982724
- Interactions in Political Economy: Malvern After Ten Years (Routledge; 1996; edited volume) ISBN 9780415133937
- Women in the Age of Economic Transformation (Routledge; 1994; edited with Nahid Aslanbeigui and Gale Summerfield) ISBN 9780415104234
  - (Spanish edition published in 1997 by Narcea, S.A.)
- Post Keynesian and Ecological Economics: Confronting Environmental Issues, (edited volume, Routledge; 2011) ISBN 9781847206688
- The Legacy of John Kenneth Galbraith,(edited volume, Routledge; 2013) ISBN 9780415603331

== Selected peer-reviewed articles ==
=== Poverty, the middle class, and income distribution ===
- "Children and Poverty: Getting the Numbers Right and the Policy Right", Journal of Poverty, (Forthcoming) [With Robert Scott].
- "The Effects of Consumer Debt on Children's Standard of Living in the USA", Changing Living Standards, ed. D. Figart (Routledge, forthcoming) [With Robert Scott].
- "Household Debt and Income Distribution", Journal of Economic Issues (June 2013) [With Robert Scott].
- "The Middle Class in Six Latin American Nations", Revista Problemas del Desarrollo, Vol. 64, #42 (January–March 2011), pp. 127–152. [In Spanish]
- "Consumer Debt and Poverty Measurement', Focus, Vol. 27, #1 (Summer 2010), pp. 9–12 [With Robert Scott].
- "Who are the Debt Poor", Journal of Economic Issues, Vol. 43, #2 (June 2009), pp. 423–432 [With Robert Scott].
- "Consumer Debt and the Measurement of Poverty and Inequality in the US", Review of Social Economy (June 2008, with Robert Scott; winner of the 2008 Warren Samuels Prize)
- "The Decline of the Middle Class: An International Perspective" Journal of Economic Issues, Vol. 40, #1 (March 2007), pp. 181–200.
- "Feminist Explanations for the Feminization of Poverty" Journal of Economic Issues, Vol. 36, #1 (June 2003), pp. 351–60.
- "Explaining the Gender Poverty Gap in Developed and Transitional Economies", Journal of Economic Issues, Vol. 35, no.1 (March 2002), pp. 17–40.
- "The Gender Poverty Gap in Developed Countries: Causes and Cures", Social Science Journal, Vol. 35, #2 (April 1998), pp. 275–86.
- "Keynes and Antipoverty Policy", Review of Social Economy, Vol. LXIX, #3 (Fall 1991), pp. 365–82.
- Pressman, Steven (March 1988). "At Home: The feminization of poverty: causes and remedies". Challenge. 31 (2). M. E. Sharpe: 57–61. doi:10.1080/05775132.1988.11471242. JSTOR 40720493.
- "Fiscal policy and work incentives – an international comparison". Journal of Income Distribution. 11 (3–4). Ad Libros Publications Inc. in association with York University, Canada: 51–69. September 2002.
- "E-Commerce, equity, and the sales tax". Dissent. University of Pennsylvania Press: 49–52. Summer 2002.
- Pressman, S (1997). "Consumption, income distribution and taxation: Keynes' fiscal policy". Journal of Income Distribution. 7 (1): 29–44. doi:10.1016/S0926-6437(97)80003-0.
- "The Feasibility of an Expenditure Tax", International Journal of Social Economy, Vol. 22, #8 (1995), pp. 3–15.
- "Deficits, Full Employment and the Use of Fiscal Policy", Review of Political Economy, Vol. 7, #2 (April 1995), pp. 212–26.
- "The Composition of Government Spending: Does It Make Any Difference?", Review of Political Economy, Vol. 6, #2 (April 1994), pp. 221–39.
- "Tax Expenditures for Child Exemptions", Journal of Economic Issues, Vol. 27, #3 (September 1993), pp. 699–719.
- "Child Exemptions or Family Allowances: What Sort of Antipoverty Program for America?", American Journal of Economics and Sociology, Vol. 51, #3 (July 1992), pp. 257–72.
- "The $1000 Question: A Tax Credit to End Child Poverty?", Challenge, Vol. 35, #1 (January–February 1992), pp. 49–52.
- "The Myths and Realities of Tax Bracket Creep", Eastern Economic Journal, Vol. XIII, #1 (January–March 1987), pp. 31–9.
- "A Tale of Two Taxpayers: The Effects of the Economic Recovery and Tax Act of 1981", Journal of Post Keynesian Economics, Vol. IX, #2 (Winter 1986–1987), pp. 226–36.
- "Why Not a Flat Tax!", Review of Business, Vol. 8, #1 (Summer 1986), pp. 4–8.

=== Post-Keynesian economics ===
- "Institutionalism", Elgar Companion to Post Keynesian Economics, 2nd ed., ed. John King (Edward Elgar, forthcoming).
- "Microeconomics After Keynes: Post Keynesian Economics and Public Policy", American Journal of Economics and Sociology, (April 2011), pp. 511–39. Reprinted in Social, Methods, and Microeconomics: Contributions to Doing Economics Better, ed. Frederick Lee (Wiley-Blackwell, 2011), pp. 210–38.
- "Federal Reserve System", Historical Encyclopedia of American Business and Finance, (Salem Press, 2009), pp. 299–302.
- "A Time to Return to Keynes", Critical Perspectives on International Business, Vol. 5, #1/2 (2009), pp. 157–61.
- "John Kenneth Galbraith and the Post Keynesian Tradition in Economics", Review of Political Economy, Vol. 20, #4 (October 2008), pp. 475–90 [lead article], Reprinted in The Legacy of John Kenneth Galbraith, ed. Steven Pressman (Routledge, 2011), pp. 1–15.
- "Nicholas Kaldor and his Principle of Cumulative Causation", Journal of Economic Issues, Vol. 42, #2 (June 2008) [with Ric Holt], pp. 367–73.
- "Expanding the Boundaries of the Economics of Crime", International Journal of Political Economy (Spring 2008), Vol. 37, #1, pp. 78–100.
- "A Prolegomena to Any Future Post Keynesian Education Policy", Journal of Post Keynesian Economics, Vol. 29, #3 (Spring 2007), pp. 455–72.
- "Economic Power, the State and Post Keynesian Economics", International Journal of Political Economy, Vol. 35, #4 (Winter 2006–07), pp. 67–86.
- "What is Wrong with Public Choice", Journal of Post Keynesian Economics, Vol. 27, #1 (Fall 2004), pp. 3–18.
- "What Do Capital Markets Really Do? And What Should We Do About Capital Markets?", Economiés et Sociétés, Vol. 10, #2–3 (1996), pp. 193–209.
- "The Policy Relevance of The General Theory", Journal of Economic Studies, Vol. 14, #4 (1987), pp. 13–23. Reprinted in The General Theory and After: Essays in Post Keynesianism, ed. John Pheby (West Yorkshire: MCB University Press, 1987). Also reprinted in John Maynard Keynes (1883–1946), ed. Mark Blaug (Edward Elgar, 1991).
- "The Lasting Contributions of John Kenneth Galbraith, 1908–2006", Journal of Post Keynesian Economics (Winter 2006–07), pp. 379–90. [with Stephen Dunn]
- "The Economic Contributions of John Kenneth Galbraith", Review of Political Economy, Vol. 17, #2 (April 2005), pp. 161–209 [lead article; with Stephen Dunn]. Revised and reprinted in Leading Contemporary Economists: Their Major Contributions, ed. S. Pressman (Routledge, 2009), pp. 281–334.

=== Physiocracy and the history of economic thought ===
- "History and Justice: The BIG Problem of Wilt Chamberlain", Economic Issues (forthcoming).
- "Paul Samuelson", Great Lives from History, ed. Rafael Medoff (Salem Press 2011), pp. 1028–30.
- "Milton Friedman", Great Lives from History, ed. Rafael Medoff (Salem Press 2011), pp. 409–11.
- "Lasting Contemporary Economists: An Introduction to their Cutting-Edge Work", Leading Contemporary Economists: Their Major Contributions, ed. Steven Pressman (Routledge 2009), pp. 1–14.
- "The Two Dogmas of Neoclassical Economics", Science and Society, Vol. 68, #4 (Winter 2004-2005), pp. 483–93. Proquest]
- "Are the Different Versions of the Tableau Consistent?", International Journal of Applied Economics and Econometrics (January–March 2003), pp. 1–22.
- "The Economic Contributions of Amartya Sen", Review of Political Economy, Vol 12, #1 (January 2000), pp. 89–113. [with Gale Summerfield]. Revised and reprinted in Leading Contemporary Economists: Their Major Contributions, ed. S. Pressman (Routledge, 2009), pp. 66–98.
- "The Economic Contributions of David M. Gordon", Review of Political Economy, Vol. 9, #2 (April 1997), pp. 225–45 [with Heather Boushey]. Revised and reprinted in Leading Contemporary Economists: Their Major Contributions, ed. S. Pressman (Routledge, 2009), pp. 15–37.
- "An American Dilemma: Fifty Years Later", Journal of Economic Issues, Vol. 28, #2 (June 1994), pp. 577–85.
- "Quesnay's Theory of Taxation", Journal of the History of Economic Thought, Vol. 16, #1 (Spring 1994), pp. 86–105.
- "Econ Agonistes: Navigating and Surviving the Publishing Process", The American Economist (Fall 2008), Vol. 52, #2, pp. 26–32
- "Kahneman, Tversky and Institutional Economics", Journal of Economic Issues, Vol. 40, #2 (June 2006), pp. 501–06.
- "Clap Happy: Applause and the Voting Paradox", Journal of Economic Methodology, Vol. 13, #2 (July 2006), pp. 241–56.
- "On Financial Frauds and Their Causes", The American Journal of Economics and Sociology, Vol. 57, #4 (October 1998), pp. 405–22.
- "Multiple Journal Submissions: The Case Against", The American Journal of Economics and Sociology (July 1994), pp. 315–33.

=== Other works ===
- "Three Million Americans are Debt Poor", Dollars and Sense (July/August 2007), pp. 10–13 [with Robert Scott]. Reprinted in Real World Banking and Finance, 5th ed., Ed. Daniel Fireside and Amy Gluckman (Dollars and Sense Collective, 2008), pp. 214–18.
- "The Economics of Grade Inflation", Challenge (July/August 2007), pp. 93–102.
