= Derek Palmer =

Derek Palmer may refer to:

- Derek Palmer (businessman) (1907/08–2001), British businessman and philatelist
- Derek Palmer (priest) (1928–2002), Anglican priest
- Derek Palmer Jr. (born 1986), British racing driver
