= Palmer (given name) =

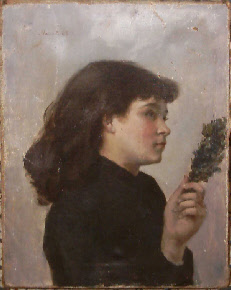
- Palm Sunday by Victorine-Louise Meurent.
- Pronunciation: UK: /ˈpɑːmər/ US: /ˈpɑːlmər/
- Gender: Unisex
- Language: English

Origin
- Language: Old French
- Origin: palmier
- Meaning: 'palm bearer, pilgrim'

Other names
- See also: Palmer (surname)

Palmer is a unisex given name that is a transferred use of a surname meaning palm bearer or pilgrim. Christian pilgrims to the Holy Land traditionally carried the palms.

The name can also be given in reference to the palms that are traditionally carried by Christians on the Sunday before Easter Sunday. The palms from the previous year are burned and the ashes are used to smudge the foreheads of worshippers attending Ash Wednesday services during Holy Week in some Christian churches as a physical reminder of their mortality.

== Popularity ==
It has been among the one thousand most popular given names for girls in the United States since 2018 and among the 300 most popular names for American girls since 2022. It is one of a number of surname names or previously masculine names that have become fashionable for American girls. The name was among the 1,000 most popular names for American boys between 1881 and 1949 but then declined in popularity as a masculine name. It was again one of the 1,000 most common names for American boys in 2021 and in 2023, but was not ranked among the 1,000 most popular names for American boys in 2022 or 2024.

== People ==
- Palmer Burch (1907–1990), American politician
- Palmer Collins (1930–2018), American politician
- Palmer Cox (1840–1924), Canadian illustrator and author
- Palmer F. Daugs (1903–1980), American politician
- Palmer DePaulis (born 1945), American politician
- Palmer D. Farrington (1918–1996), American politician
- H. Palmer Hall (1942–2013), American poet, fiction writer, essayist, editor and librarian
- Palmer E. Havens (1818–1886), American politician
- Palmer Hayden (1890–1973), American painter
- Palmer Kelley, American baseball player
- Palmer Luckey (born 1992), American entrepreneur
- Palmer McAbee (1894–1970), American musician
- Palmer E. Pierce (1865–1940), American general and sports administrator
- Palmer Cosslett Putnam (1900–1984), American engineer
- Palmer Pyle (1937–2021), American football player
- Palmer C. Ricketts (1856–1934), American academic administrator
- Palmer Taylor (born 1992), Canadian snowboarder
- Palmer Wapau (born 1983), Australian rugby league footballer
- Palmer Williams (died 1996), American journalist
- Palmer Williams Jr. (born 1965), American actor

== Fictional characters ==
- Palmer Cortlandt, on the soap opera All My Children
- Palmer Dodge, in the comedy film Just Go with It
- Palmer Joss, in the 1985 science fiction novel Contact
