= Brian Palmer =

Brian Palmer may refer to:

- Brian Palmer (motivational speaker), president of National Speakers Bureau in Libertyville, Illinois
- Brian Palmer (social anthropologist) (born 1964), social anthropologist and academic of religion at Uppsala University

== See also ==
- Bryan Palmer (1899–1990), Australian rugby union player
