= Jack Palmer =

Jack Palmer may refer to:

- Jack Palmer (boxer) (1879–1928), English heavyweight boxer
- Jack Palmer (comics), cartoon character created by René Pétillon
- Jack Palmer (composer) (1900–1976), American pianist and composer
- Jack Palmer (cricketer) (1903–1979), Australian cricketer
- Jack Palmer (footballer) (1905–1946), Australian rules footballer
