= Justice Palmer =

Justice Palmer may refer to:

- Cornelius S. Palmer (1844–1932), associate justice of the South Dakota Supreme Court
- George Palmer (composer) (born 1947), associate justice of the Supreme Court of New South Wales
- John S. Palmore (1917–2017), associate justice of the Kentucky Supreme Court
- Martin Parmer (born Martin Palmer, 1778–1850), chief justice of Jasper County, Texas under the Republic of Texas
- Richard N. Palmer (born 1950), associate justice of the Connecticut Supreme Court
- William A. Palmer (1781–1860), associate justice of the Vermont Supreme Court
