= Keith Palmer =

Keith Palmer may refer to:

- Keith Palmer (businessman) (born 1947), British businessman
- Keith Palmer (footballer) (1919–2008), Australian rules footballer
- Keith Palmer (singer) (1957–1996), American country music artist

- Keith Palmer (album), his album

- Keith Palmer (film editor) (born 1942), British film editor
- Maxim (musician) (born 1967), stage name of Keith Palmer, British rap musician
- Keith Palmer (24 character), a character from the television series 24
- SS Keith Palmer, American Liberty ship named for a journalist killed by the Japanese in World War II
- Keith Palmer (police officer) (1969–2017), London police constable killed in the Westminster attack
