= Ian Palmer =

Ian Palmer may refer to:

- Ian Palmer (bishop) (born 1950), former Anglican bishop of Bathurst
- Ian Palmer (footballer) (1921–2005), Australian rules footballer
- Ian Palmer (golfer) (born 1957), South African golfer
- Ian Palmer (sailor) (born 1941), Australian Olympic sailor
- Ian Palmer (soccer, born 1966) (1966–2021), South African football coach
- Ian Palmer (soccer, fl. 1955), South African footballer
- Ian Palmer, musician from the group Hexedene
