= Admiral Palmer =

Admiral Palmer may refer to:

- Henry Palmer (Royal Navy officer, born 1582) (1582–1644), British Royal Navy vice admiral
- Frederick F. Palmer (1925–1992), U.S. Navy rear admiral
- James Shedden Palmer (1810–1867), U.S. Navy rear admiral
