= Paul Palmer =

Paul Palmer may refer to:

- Paul Palmer (American football) (born 1964), American football player
- Paul Palmer (cricketer) (born 1992), Jamaican cricketer
- Paul Palmer (minister) (died 1747), American religious leader
- Paul Palmer (physicist) (1926–2011), American physicist
- Paul Palmer (swimmer) (born 1974), British swimmer

Paul Palmer may also refer to:

- Paul Palmer (schooner), a five-masted schooner built in 1902
- Paul Palmer (shipwreck), 1902 shipwreck site in Massachusetts, USA
