= Philip Palmer (disambiguation) =

Philip Palmer is a British novelist and screenwriter.

Philip Palmer may also refer to:

- Philip Palmer (priest), Anglican priest
- Phil Palmer, guitarist
- C. Phil Palmer, palaeontologist

== See also ==
- Philip Palmer Green, theoretical and computational biologist
