= Gary Palmer (disambiguation) =

Gary Palmer (born 1954) is a United States representative from Alabama.

Gary Palmer may also refer to:

- Gary Palmer (cricketer) (born 1965), English cricketer
- Gary Palmer (choreographer) (born 1951), American choreographer
