= Alice Palmer =

Alice Palmer may refer to:

- Alice Palmer (designer), Scottish dress and handbag designer
- Alice Palmer (politician) (born 1939), Illinois politician and educator
- Alice Freeman Palmer (1855–1902), American educator
  - SS Alice F. Palmer, a Liberty ship
- Alice May Palmer, New Zealand public servant
