= Kevin Palmer =

Kevin Palmer may refer to:

- Kevin Palmer (singer), singer with Trust Company
- Kevin Palmer (basketball) (born 1987), American basketball player
- Kevin Palmer, English timeshare salesman who disappeared in March 1999
