= Harold Palmer =

Harold Palmer may refer to:

- Harold E. Palmer (1877–1949), English linguist and phonetician
- Harold Sutton Palmer (1854–1933), English watercolour landscape painter and illustrator
- Harold Palmer (cricketer) (1890–1967), English cricketer
- Harold Palmer (hermit), hermit
