= Peter Palmer =

Peter Palmer may refer to:

- Peter Palmer (actor) (1931–2021), American actor
- Peter Palmer (judge) (died 1621), English-born judge in Ireland
- Peter Palmer (rugby union), Australian former rugby union player
- Pete Palmer (born 1938), American mathematician and author
- Harvard "Pete" Palmer Jr., authority on promotion and operation of car donation programs for charitable causes
