= Sandra Palmer =

Sandra Palmer may refer to:

- Sandra Palmer (golfer)
- Sandra Palmer (entrepreneur)
- Sandra Palmer (24 character)
