= Scott Palmer =

Scott Palmer may refer to:

- Scott B. Palmer (born 1950), American political operative
- Scott Palmer (American football) (born 1948), American football player
- Scott Palmer (rugby union) (born 1977), New Zealand born Italian rugby union footballer

== See also ==
- Scot Palmer (1937–2022), Australian sports journalist
