= Norman Palmer =

Norman Palmer may refer to:

- Norman R. Palmer (1918–2013), American film editor
- Norman Palmer (bishop) (1928–2008), Solomon Islands
- Norm Palmer, see 1979 NASCAR Winston Cup Series

== See also ==
- A. N. Palmer (Austin Norman Palmer, 1860–1927), American innovator in field of penmanship
- Palmer (surname)
