= Eric Palmer =

Eric Palmer may refer to:

- Eric Palmer (cricketer) (1931–2019), English cricketer
- Eric Palmer (philosopher), American philosopher
- Eric Palmer (politician) (born 1960), American politician

== See also ==
- Erik Palmer-Brown (born 1997), American soccer player
