= Shirley Palmer =

Shirley Palmer is the name of:

- Shirley Palmer (physician) (1786–1852), English physician and medical writer
- Shirley Palmer (actress) (1908–2000), American film actress
- Shirley Palmer (Kansas politician) (1943–2023), Democratic member of the Kansas House of Representatives

== See also ==
- Shirley W. Palmer-Ball (1930–2012), Republican in the U.S. state of Kentucky
