= Gerald Palmer =

Gerald Palmer may refer to:

- Gerald Palmer (car designer) (1911–1999), designer of the Jowett Javelin
- Gerald Palmer (author) (1904–1984), author, English-language translator and British Conservative politician
- Gerald Palmer (comics), comics artist whose work includes Dan Dare
