= Terry Palmer =

Terry Palmer may refer to:

- Terry Palmer (footballer) (born 1972), retired Irish soccer player
- Terry Palmer (alpine skier) (born 1952), American former alpine skier
- Terry Palmer (actor) in Bomb in the High Street
