= Jason Palmer =

Jason Palmer may refer to:

- Jason Palmer (prison officer) (c. 1977–2010), United States-born prison guard in New Zealand
- Jason Palmer (golfer) (born 1984), English golfer
- Jason Palmer (politician) (born 1971), American entrepreneur and 2024 Democratic presidential candidate
