= Helen Palmer =

Helen Palmer may refer to:

- Helen Palmer (archer) (born 1974), British archer
- Helen Palmer (publisher) (1917–1979), Australian publisher, educationalist, author, historian and communist
- Helen Palmer (writer) (1898–1967), children's book author and wife of Theodor Geisel (Dr. Seuss)
- Helen Chenoweth-Hage (born Helen Margaret Palmer, 1938-2006), American politician
