= Derek Palmer (businessman) =

British businessman and philatelist

Fred Derek Grove Palmer
- Born: 1907
- Died: 6 September 2001 (aged 93–94)

Fred Derek Grove Palmer (1907 – 6 September 2001) was a British businessman from Faversham, Kent in the import/export trade resident in Chile.

== Philately ==
In his spare time, Palmer was a philatelist, who was added to the Roll of Distinguished Philatelists in 1977. He won a medal for his display "War of the Pacific" at Philympia 1970.
