= Mark Palmer =

Mark Palmer may refer to:

- Mark Palmer (cricketer) (born 1967), Australian cricketer
- Mark Palmer (diplomat) (1941–2013), American diplomat
- Sir Mark Palmer, 5th Baronet (born 1941), British aristocrat
