= Ernest Palmer =

Ernest Palmer may refer to:

- Ernest Palmer (American cinematographer) (1885–1978), Hollywood cinematographer
- Ernest Palmer (British cinematographer) (1901–1964), British cinematographer
- Ernest Palmer, 1st Baron Palmer (1858–1948), British businessman and patron of music
- Ernest Jesse Palmer (1875–1962), botanical taxonomist and plant collector
- Ernest "Chili" Palmer, the lead character in the novel Get Shorty, and subsequent works
