= Jane Palmer =

British author and illustrator (born 1946)

Jane Palmer (b. 1946) is an author and illustrator of speculative fiction from the United Kingdom. In addition to novels, she writes short stories and children's picture books.

== Career ==
The Moosevan series, depicting an eponymous alien with the ability to shape-shift visiting Earth, represented Palmer's entry into speculative fiction. The series included The Planet Dweller (1985), Moving Moosevan (1990), Duckbill Soup (2011) and Brassica Park (2018), and satirizes clichés in speculative fiction. The protagonist of the first two Moosevan books, a woman experiencing menopause, was described by scholar Mary Talbot as atypical for science fiction, and an example of how feminist science fiction writers sought to explore marginalized subjects.

Palmer's second novel was The Watcher (1986), republished in 2008 as The Kybion. It featured an android and some young girls from Earth seeking to protect the fictional planet of Ojal from a threat from Earth. The story is partially told from the point of view of an alien. The Ojalie, or beings of Ojal, are depicted as hermaphrodites, a device Palmer uses to explore how contemporary women combined the role of a mother with a career. They are also depicted as "parodic in their narcissism", and have been discussed as an example of grotesque female characters in feminist fiction. A commentary in the Australian Science Fiction Review discussed The Watcher as an example of speculative fiction published by The Women's Press, which aimed to publish feminist work. The review described the plot arc of The Watcher as "adolescent rite-of-passage stuff", which did "little to advance the feminist cause".

Palmer's other books included The Drune (1999), described by the Encyclopedia of Science Fiction as "even lighter in tone than The Watcher; The Aton Bird (2008); Nightingale (2008); and Hunder (2010). In 2013, she also released a collection of stories for adults, Short SF Stories, Tales for Technophobe, and she has written and illustrated children's picture books.
