= Ian Palmer (footballer) =

Australian rules footballer

Personal information
- Full name: Ian Loughrey Palmer
- Born: 11 April 1921; Kyneton, Victoria
- Died: 22 September 2005 (aged 84)
- Original team: Mount Carmel Old Collegians
- Height: 180 cm (5 ft 11 in)
- Weight: 81 kg (179 lb)

Playing career^{1}
Years	Club	Games (Goals)
1941	South Melbourne	1 (0)
- ^{1} Playing statistics correct to the end of 1941.

Ian Loughrey Palmer (11 April 1921 – 22 September 2005) was an Australian rules footballer who played with South Melbourne in the Victorian Football League (VFL).

Palmer enlisted to serve in the Australian Army in 1942, and served in Darwin and Borneo in the latter stages of World War II.
