= Samuel Palmer (disambiguation) =

Samuel Palmer (1805–1881) was an English painter.

Samuel Palmer may also refer to:

- Samuel Palmer (biographer) (1741–1813), English minister
- Samuel Palmer (printer) (??–1732), English printer
- Samuel Palmer (surgeon) (1670–1738), English surgeon

== See also ==
- Samuel Palmer Brooks (1863–1931), American academic administrator
