= Glenn Palmer =

Glenn Palmer may refer to:

- Glenn Palmer (sheriff) (born 1961), sheriff of Grant County, Oregon
- Glenn Palmer (sprint canoer) (born 1945), British sprint canoer
