= Anthony Palmer =

Anthony or Tony Palmer may refer to:

- Anthony Palmer (VC), English recipient of the Victoria Cross
- Anthony Palmer (British Army officer) (born 1949), deputy chief of the Defence Staff
- Tony Palmer (director) (born 1941), British film director and author
- Tony Palmer (American football) (born 1983), American football guard
- Tony Palmer (bishop) (1966–2014), British-born South African bishop
- Tony Palmer (cyclist) (born 1966), American former cyclist
