= Barry Palmer =

Barry Palmer may refer to:

- Barry Palmer (British singer), worked with Mike Oldfield
- Barry Palmer (musician), Australian musician, worked with the band Hunters and Collectors
- Barry Hill Palmer, aeronautical engineer, designer and pilot
- Barry Palmer (politician), American politician
