= Paul Palmer (schooner) =

American schooner

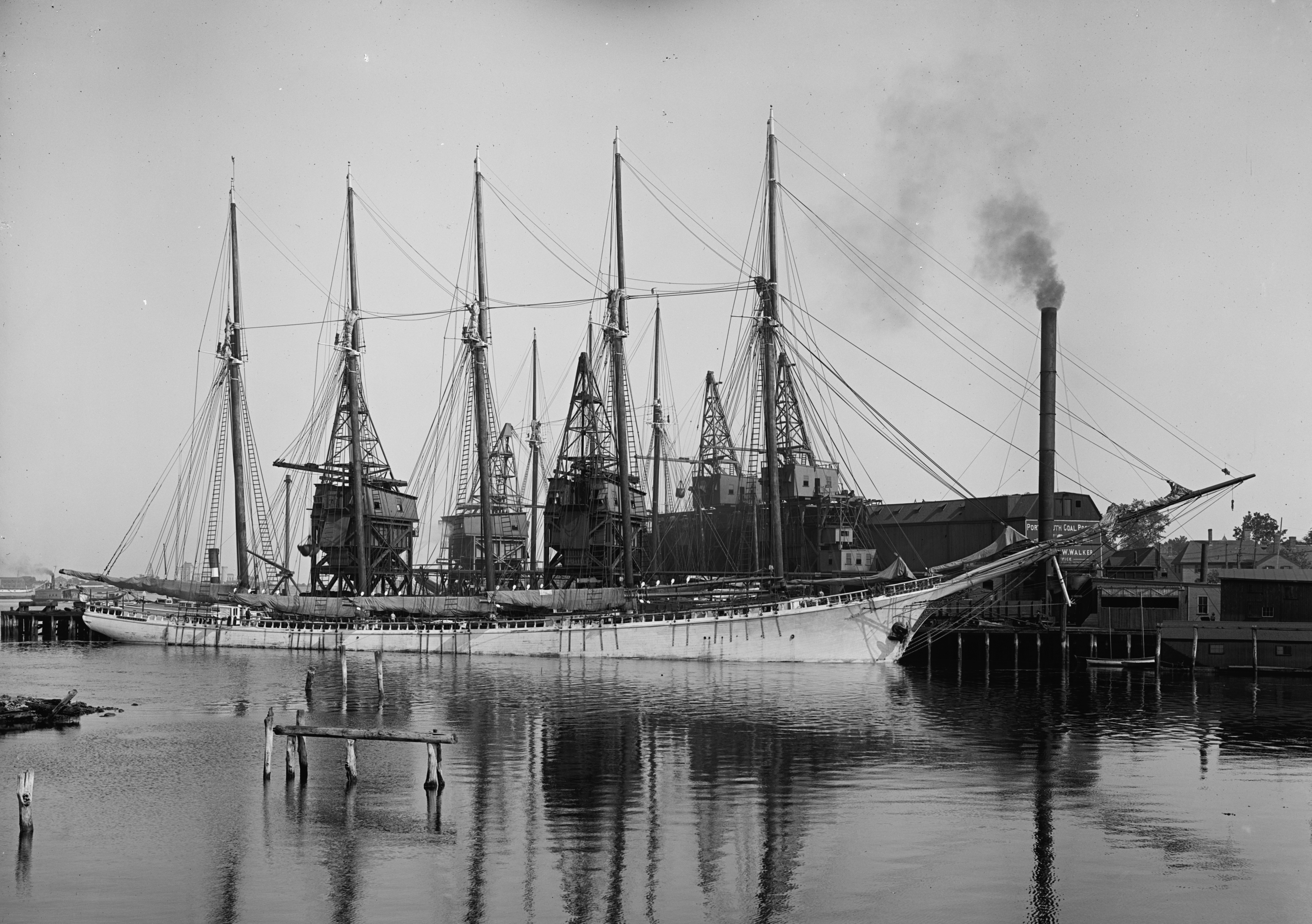
- Paul Palmer at coal docks

History

United States
- Namesake: Paul Palmer
- Owner: William H. Palmer (1902-1911); J. S. Winslow & Co. (1911-1913)
- Builder: George L. Welt, Waldoboro, ME
- Launched: 1902
- Fate: Burned to waterline and sank on June 15, 1913, no loss of men

General characteristics
- Tonnage: 2,193
- Length: 276 ft (84 m)
- Beam: 44 ft (13 m)
- Draft: 24 ft (7.3 m)
- Sail plan: 5 fore-and-aft course sails, 5 topsails, 4 jibs, 5 stay sails
- Paul Palmer (Shipwreck and Remains)
- U.S. National Register of Historic Places
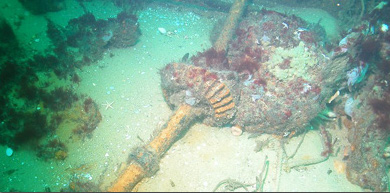
- Remains of the Paul Palmer's steam winch
- Nearest city: Provincetown, Massachusetts
- Built: 1902
- Architect: Welt, George L.; Palmer, William F.
- NRHP reference No.: 07000288
- Added to NRHP: April 12, 2007

The Paul Palmer was a five-masted schooner built in 1902 by George F. Welt in Waldoboro, Maine.

It was part of William F. Palmer's fleet of white-hulled vessels active in the New England coal trade. The fleet was sold to J. S. Winslow and Company in 1911.

After departing Rockport, Maine on Friday, June 13, 1913, under the command of Capt. Howard B. Allen and destined for Newport News, VA where she would pick up a load of coal for the return voyage, Paul Palmer caught fire on 15 June 1913 for unknown reasons. Attempts to douse the flames with the vessel's own pumps were not successful, and the crew abandoned ship. The Paul Palmer burned down to the waterline and then sank. There were 11 passengers and crew on board, including the captain's wife and a female guest. The passengers of the Palmer took to lifeboats and were picked up later on by the fishing schooner Rose Dorothea, bringing them to Provincetown, Massachusetts. The cutter Androscoggin was dispatched from Portland, Maine to destroy the remnants of the wreck so as to avoid a hazard to other ships.

In 2000, researchers at the Stellwagen Bank National Marine Sanctuary discovered the wreck and documented it, locating artifacts that proved the ship's identity in 2002. The wreck was added to the National Register of Historic Places in 2007.

== Image ==
- Launching of the Paul Palmer
