= Brian Palmer (social anthropologist) =

American anthropologist (born 1964)

- Born: Brian Palmer; 1964 (age 61–62); New York City, New York, U.S.
- Education: PhD Harvard
- Alma mater: Harvard University
- Occupation: Social Anthropology
- Employer: Uppsala University
- Website: brianpalmer.org

Brian Charles William Palmer (born 1964) is an American social anthropologist and scholar of religion at Uppsala University.

== Biography ==
Born in Brooklyn, New York, Brian Palmer graduated valedictorian of his class at Stuyvesant High School, and later he received his doctorate at Harvard University in 2000 with the dissertation Wolves at the Door: Existential Solidarity in a Globalizing Sweden, was lecturer on the Modern West until 2004. He was also the university's head tutor on religion. In 2002 he was voted "best lecturer" at Harvard University.

== Personal ==
Brian Palmer currently lives in Stockholm.

== Work ==
Brian Palmer currently teaches at Uppsala University in Sweden, while also lecturing widely outside the university. Previously he held the Torgny Segerstedt Guest Professorship at Gothenburg University. Some of his works were focused on Sweden such as the country's form of socialistic individualism. He maintained that in this system, the presence of certain institutions creates a level of security for citizens, which paradoxically also leads to more freedom. He also explored the incidence of social dislocation, proposing that the countryside is itself a site of historical transformation, generating social relations, and demographic changes.

== Media ==
=== Selected publications ===
- Global Values 101: A Short Course. USA: Beacon Press. 2006. ISBN 0807003050.
- George W Reinfeldt : konsten att göra en politisk extreme makeover. Sweden: Karneval förlag. 2006. ISBN 9197603147.
