= Harold Palmer (cricketer) =

English cricketer

Personal information
- Full name: Harold James Palmer
- Born: 30 August 1890; Epping, Essex, England
- Died: 12 February 1967 (aged 76); Bexhill-on-Sea, Sussex, England
- Batting: Right-handed
- Bowling: Right-arm leg-spin

Domestic team information
- Years: Team
- 1924 to 1932: Essex

Career statistics
Competition	First-class
Matches	58
Runs scored	278
Batting average	5.91
100s/50s	0/0
Top score	25 not out
Balls bowled	8,079
Wickets	160
Bowling average	25.33
5 wickets in innings	7
10 wickets in match	0
Best bowling	6/68
Catches/stumpings	21/–
- Source: Cricinfo, 2 November 2019

Harold James Palmer (30 August 1890 – 12 February 1967) was an English cricketer who played first-class cricket as an amateur for Essex between 1924 and 1932.

Palmer was educated at Loughton School in Essex and King's College London. He bowled leg-spin at medium-pace. His Essex teammate Charles Bray said he was "an excellent bowler – the nearest thing I've seen to Bill O'Reilly", but added that Palmer's fielding was unreliable, "particularly his catching". Palmer's best bowling figures came in Essex's victory over Gloucestershire in 1926, when he took 3 for 19 and 6 for 68. Opening the bowling for Essex against the Australians in 1930, he took 5 for 40 in the first innings.
