= Stuart Palmer =

Stuart Palmer may refer to:

- Stuart Palmer (author) (1905–1968), American writer
- Stuart Palmer (footballer) (born 1951), Australian rules footballer
- Stuart Palmer (physicist), English physicist
