= Jack Palmer (footballer) =

Australian rules footballer, born 1905

Personal information
- Full name: John Edward Palmer
- Born: 2 January 1905; Port Pirie, South Australia
- Died: 5 October 1946 (aged 41); Manoora, South Australia
- Original team: St Kilda CYMS (CYMSFA)

Playing career^{1}
Years	Club	Games (Goals)
1926	St Kilda	4 (1)
- ^{1} Playing statistics correct to the end of 1926.

Jack Palmer (2 January 1905 – 5 October 1946) was an Australian rules footballer who played with St Kilda in the Victorian Football League (VFL).

Palmer was originally from South Australia, but spent a few years with CYMS Football Association club St Kilda CYMS before making his VFL debut in 1926.
