= Lou Palmer =

Lou Palmer may refer to:

- Lou Palmer (sportscaster) (1935–2019), former sports broadcaster on baseball
- Lou Palmer (motorsport broadcaster) (1932–2008), American broadcaster at the Indianapolis 500
