= Miriam Augusta Palmer =

American professor of entomology and zoology, scientific artist and sculptor

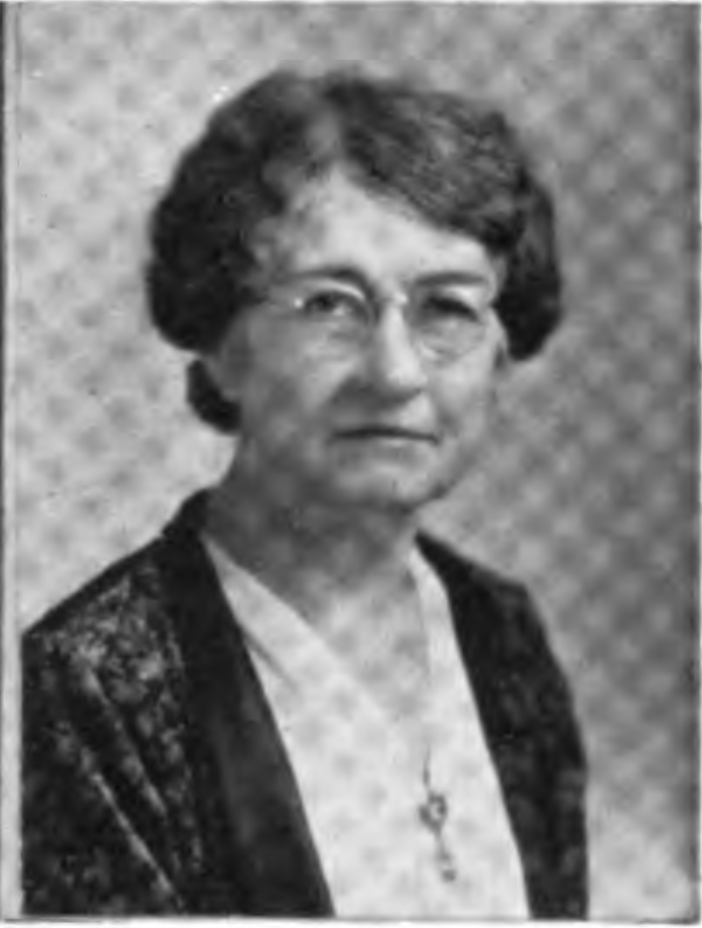
Miriam Augusta Palmer

Miriam Augusta Palmer (August 28, 1878 – July 4, 1977) was an American professor of entomology and zoology, scientific artist and sculptor.

== Biography ==
Miriam Augusta Palmer was born on August 28, 1878, in Mont Clare, United States of America. She graduated from the University of Kansas. After completing her master's degree in 1904, she joined as a scientific illustrator at the experiment station of the Colorado Agricultural College, now known as Colorado State University, and continued until 1928.

In the same institute she also served as an instructor at the department of Entomology and Zoology from 1918 to 1947. She undertook major research on aphids in the Rocky Mountain region. As an insect delineator, she was known for her “detailed drawings and colorful paintings of insects”. Palmer was also specialized in making wax replicas of fruits.

She was a Fellow of Entomological Society of America.

She died in the United States in Fort Collins, Colorado, on July 4, 1977.
