= Stephen Palmer =

Stephen or Steve Palmer is the name of:

- Steve Palmer (footballer) (born 1968), English footballer
- Stephen Palmer (orienteer), British orienteer
- Stephen Palmer (politician), American politician
- Stephen Palmer, guitarist with The High Strung
- Steve J. Palmer (born 1975), American actor and producer.
