= Keith Palmer (footballer) =

Australian rules footballer, born 1919

Personal information
- Full name: Keith Sutherland Palmer
- Born: 29 November 1919; Dimboola, Victoria
- Died: 2 July 2008 (aged 88)
- Original team: Golden Point
- Height: 185 cm (6 ft 1 in)
- Weight: 75 kg (165 lb)

Playing career^{1}
Years	Club	Games (Goals)
1941	Geelong	5 (0)
1943	Footscray	5 (4)
Total		10 (4)
- ^{1} Playing statistics correct to the end of 1943.

Keith Sutherland Palmer (29 November 1919 – 2 July 2008) was an Australian rules footballer who played with Geelong and Footscray in the Victorian Football League (VFL).

Sutherland served in the Australian Army during World War II, playing for Geelong in 1941 while serving, and then playing for Footscray after his discharge in May 1943.
