= Fredrikke Palmer =

Norwegian-American illustrator

- Born: Fredrikke Marie Schjöth; May 26, 1860; Drammen, Norway
- Died: March 23, 1947 (aged 86); Honolulu, Hawaii
- Occupations: Illustrator, cartoonist, art editor

Fredrikke S. Palmer (May 26, 1860 – March 23, 1947) was a Norwegian-born American illustrator and cartoonist, best known for her work in The Woman's Journal, an American suffrage magazine.

== Early life ==
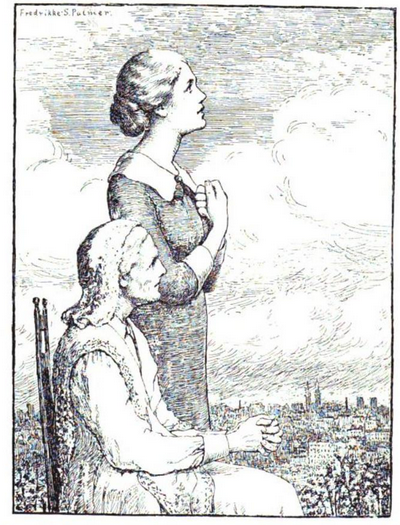
Fredrikke S. Palmer, "Waiting" (1917)

Fredrikke Marie Schjöth (or Schjödt or Schiøt) was born in Drammen, Norway, the daughter of Jens Rudolf Schjöth and Inger Claudine Schjöth (née Thomesen). She studied art in Norway with Knud Bergslien, and in Berlin with Karl Gussow.

== Career ==
Fredrikke Palmer was a member of the Society of Cleveland Artists before 1900, and later a member of the New Haven Paint and Clay Club. She exhibited a portrait of her husband at the New York Watercolor Club's show in 1905.

Palmer was staff artist and art editor of The Women's Journal. Her cartoons were detailed realistic engraved drawings of women and children, often addressing such issues as child labor, prohibition, and suffrage.

== Personal life ==
In 1884, Fredrikke Schjödt married Arthur Hubbell Palmer (1859–1918), an American professor, in Oslo, and moved with him to Cleveland, Ohio. They later lived in New Haven, Connecticut. They had two sons, Harold (1890–1959), a geologist at the University of Hawaii, and Erik (1885-1957), a mathematics professor. In widowhood she moved to Honolulu, Hawaii, where she died in 1947, aged 86 years.
