= Senator Palmer =

Senator Palmer may refer to:

== Members of the United States Senate ==
- John M. Palmer (politician) (1817–1900), U.S. Senator from Illinois from 1891 to 1897
- Thomas W. Palmer (1830–1913), U.S. Senator from Michigan from 1883 to 1889
- William A. Palmer (1781–1860), U.S. Senator from Vermont from 1818 to 1825
- David Palmer (24 character), fictional U.S. Senator in the television series 24

== United States state senate members ==
- Abiah W. Palmer (1835–1881), New York State Senate
- Abraham J. Palmer (1847–1922), New York State Senate
- Albert Palmer (American politician) (1831–1887), Massachusetts State Senate
- Alice Palmer (politician) (1939–2023), Illinois State Senate
- Andrew Palmer (politician) (1808–1891), Wisconsin State Senate
- George W. Palmer (Virginia politician) (1894–1972), Virginia State Senate
- Harry J. Palmer (1872–1948), New York State Senate
- Henry L. Palmer (1819–1909), Wisconsin State Senate
- Joel Palmer (1810–1881), Oregon State Senate
- Linwood E. Palmer Jr. (1921–2008), Maine State Senate
- Peggy Palmer (born 1945), Kansas State Senate
- R. J. Palmer (born 1970), Kentucky State Senate
- Richard F. Palmer (1930–2018), Minnesota State Senate
- Robert Moffett Palmer (1820–1862), Pennsylvania State Senate
- William D. Palmer (born 1935), Iowa State Senate
