= Albert Palmer =

Albert Palmer may refer to:

- Albert Palmer (American politician)
- Albert Palmer (Australian politician)
- Albert Palmer (Canadian politician)
- Sir Albert Palmer (judge), Chief Justice of the Solomon Islands
- Albert Marshman Palmer, American theatrical manager
