= Alice Palmer (designer) =

Scottish knitwear designer

Alice Palmer is a Scottish knitwear designer who has won many awards and is much influenced by Arabic art.
