= Clifford Palmer =

Anglican priest in New Zealand

Clifford George Palmer was the Dean of Waikato from 1957 until 1974.

Palmer was educated at the University of New Zealand and ordained in 1933. After Curacies in Epsom and Croydon, he was the incumbent at the Bay of Islands. He was a Chaplain to the New Zealand armed forces from 1940 to 1945. When peace returned he was Vicar of St Thomas, Coventry and then of Christ Church, Whangārei.
