= David Palmer =

David Palmer may refer to:

- David Palmer (American football) (born 1972), wide receiver
- David Palmer (baseball) (born 1957), baseball pitcher
- David Palmer (curler) (born 1960), American wheelchair curler
- David Palmer (squash player) (born 1976), Australian squash player
- David Palmer (vocalist), American vocalist with Steely Dan
- Dave Palmer (keyboardist) (born 1968), session musician
- David R. Palmer (born 1941), American science fiction author
- Dave Richard Palmer (born 1934), US Army Lieutenant General
- Dee Palmer (1937–2026), British arranger and keyboardist, formerly David Palmer of Jethro Tull
- David Palmer, British drummer and former member of ABC

== Fictional ==
- David Palmer (24), president of the U.S. in the television series 24
