= James Palmer =

James, Jim or Jimmy Palmer may refer to:

== Politicians ==
- James Palmer (politician, born 1969), former mayor of the Cambridgeshire and Peterborough Combined Authority
- James Palmer (1585–1658), member of parliament for Canterbury, Chancellor of the Order of the Garter
- Herbert James Palmer (1851–1939), or H. James Palmer, Canadian politician
- Sir James Frederick Palmer (1803–1871), Australian politician
- James Dampier Palmer (1851–1899), British politician
- James George Palmer (1875–1952), American politician
- James Bardin Palmer (died 1833), Irish-born land agent, lawyer and politician in Prince Edward Island

== Sportspeople ==
- James Palmer Jr. (born 1996), American professional basketball player for the Cleveland Charge
- Jim Palmer (born 1945), member of the Baseball Hall of Fame
- Jim Palmer (basketball, born 1933) (1933–2013), American professional basketball player
- Jim Palmer (racing driver) (born 1942), New Zealand racer
- Jim Palmer (wheelchair basketball) (born 1997), British wheelchair basketball player
- Jimmy Palmer (footballer) (1877–1947), Australian rules footballer for Geelong
- Jamie Palmer (born 1985), British footballer
- James Palmer (cyclist) (born 1994), Canadian BMX cyclist

== Characters ==
- Jimmy Palmer (NCIS), NCIS character
- James Palmer, character in Goodbye World

== Others ==
- James A. Palmer (1825–1896), Irish-American photographer
- James Shedden Palmer (1810–1867), American admiral and U.S. Navy officer during the American Civil War
- James Palmer (priest) (died 1660), priest and philanthropist
- James Palmer (bishop) (1869–1954), British Anglican bishop in Bombay

== See also ==
- James Palmer-Tomkinson (1915–1952), British skier
