= Daniel Palmer =

Daniel or Dan Palmer may refer to:

- Daniel Palmer (art historian) (born 1971), Australian historian, critic, academic, and theorist of contemporary art, photography, and digital media
- Daniel David Palmer (1845–1913), founder of chiropractic
- Daniel S. Palmer (born 1984), American curator
- Dan Palmer (rugby union) (born 1988), Australian rugby union coach and player
- Dan Palmer (guitarist) (born 1978), English guitarist
