= Bruce Palmer (disambiguation) =

Bruce Palmer is a musician known for playing in Buffalo Springfield.

Bruce Palmer may also refer to:

- Bruce Palmer (basketball) (born 1955), basketball coach
- Bruce Palmer Jr. (1913–2000), US general, acting Army Chief of Staff in 1972
- Bruce Palmer (judge) (1935–2017), New Zealand lawyer and judge
