= Ralph Palmer =

Ralph Palmer may refer to:

- Ralph Palmer, 12th Baron Lucas (born 1951), British politician
- Ralph Palmer Agnew (1900–1986), American mathematician
- Ralph Palmer (judge) (1783–1838), British judge
- Ralph Charlton Palmer (1839–1923), English barrister
- Ralph Judson Palmer (1943–1971), American newspaper publisher
- Ralph Lee Palmer (1909–2005), American computer engineer
