= Julie Palmer =

New Zealand sedimentologist

Julie Palmer is a New Zealand-based sedimentologist. She is currently a Senior Lecturer at Massey University. Her key research focus is the stratigraphy and sedimentary systems of the Taranaki oil and gas fields, and the Wanganui-Manawatu Basins.

Palmer's latest research is focused on young sedimentary systems studying the aquifers and groundwater in the Whanganui-Manawaty region for their application to rural and urban development in these regions.

== Early life and education ==
Palmer did her undergraduate degree at Victoria University of Wellington, gaining a BSc in 1975 and a BSc (Hons) in 1976. She then stayed on at Victoria University to gain her MSc in 1979 before being one of the first women to be appointed into the New Zealand geoscience industry as an exploration geologist for Petrocorp (later Fletcher Petroleum). During which she spent time on offshore drilling rigs, she was involved in the exploration of the McKee oilfield in the early 1980s. Palmer became the Regional Manager for SE Asia in 1989–1992, before she was appointed as a lecturer in Earth Sciences at Massey University in 1994.

== Career and impact ==
She also has an interest in geoheritage and geoeducation. She teaches undergraduates in industry and supervises post-graduates. Palmer was the first female president of the Geological Society of New Zealand from 2002–2003.
