= Andrew Palmer =

Andrew or Andy Palmer may refer to:

- Andrew Palmer (politician) (1808–1891), American politician and newspaper publisher in Wisconsin
- Andrew Palmer (diplomat) (1937–2019), British diplomat
- Andrew Clennel Palmer (1938–2019), British engineer
- Andy Palmer (runner) (1953–2002), American distance runner and coach
- N. A. Palmer (Andrew Palmer, born 1956), British punk musician and artist
- Andy Palmer (born 1963), British engineer and Nissan executive
- Andrew Palmer (technologist) (born 1966), American businessman
- Andrew Palmer (racing driver) (born 1994), American racing driver
