= Roy Palmer =

Roy Palmer may refer to:

- Roy Palmer (musician) (1892–1963), American jazz trombonist
- Roy Palmer (cricketer) (born 1942), English cricketer and umpire
- Roy Palmer (folklorist) (1932–2015), singer, teacher, folklorist, author and historian
