= Jessica Palmer =

American writer

Jessica Palmer (born 1953) is an American-born author who is also a British citizen. Under her full name, Jessica Palmer, she writes science fiction, fantasy, mystery and horror. Palmer writes nonfiction under the name Jessica Dawn Palmer, with the name Dawn added to differentiate her nonfiction from her fiction. Her mother was a professional clown who went under the name of Mar-jo and has a plaque in the Clown Hall of Fame. Palmer was born in Chicago, Illinois. She initially studied psychology and nursing. Her works have been translated into Norwegian, Japanese, Italian, Russian and Romanian. Her novellas were released in the Netherlands. Dark Lullaby was nominated for the Bram Stoker Award for best first novel in 1989. Palmer was listed in Starburst magazine’s SF Top 200 in 1999 and Germany's Horror Lexicon published in 2001.

== Career ==
Her articles have appeared in numerous magazines, such as:

- Horror? No Thank You, I Just Ate; SF Nexus, March 1994
- So You Want To Be A Writer, Spring 1992, Nexus
- Anne McCaffrey, Dragons and Beyond, May 1991, Millions Magazine
- Anne McCaffrey, the Woman and the Writer, December 1990, Midnight Experiences.
- All Alone in the Dark, Fear Magazine, September, 1989, reprinted in the Horror Writers Association Newsletter

She worked as a Crime Writer for the Roswell Daily Record in Roswell, New Mexico, from 2010 - 2014. Palmer received the first place award from the New Mexico Press Association for Public Service in 2012 and first place award in the category of Breaking News in 2014. In the 1970/80s, she has worked at a journalist at the Pasadena Citizen. and the Brazosport Facts in Texas. During her career in journalism, she has done freelance work for The Salina Journal, Associated Press, UPI and Las Cruces Sun News. In addition, Palmer has written as a general assignments reporter and columnist of Critter’s Corner from 2002-2005 for the McPherson Sentinel. She's also written columns called Crew Cuts, Skeleton Crew in England in 1990.

Late in 2001, Palmer founded a 501(c)3 charity Wild and Wooly dedicated to wildlife rescue and rehabilitation. She has a federal permit to work with wildlife and has held state permits in Kansas, Florida and in New Mexico. Palmer has treated all sorts of animals, from alligators and owls to eagles, squirrels and bobcats to deer. She has worked as a technical writer. Palmer does public speaking on animal and conservation issues, along with linguistics. both in England and in the U.S. She taught classes in creative writing and publishing in England.

== Bibliography ==
Non-fiction (under the name Jessica Dawn Palmer)

- Animal Wisdom, The Definitive Guide to the Myth, Folklore and Medicine Power of Animals - HarperCollins (Mar 19 2001, reprint 2007) ISBN 978-0-00-710218-1.
- The Dakota Peoples: A History of the Dakota, Lakota and Nakota through 1863 - McFarland (January 2008) ISBN 978-0-7864-3177-9.
- "The Apache Peoples, The History of All Bands and Tribes through 1880s. McFarland and Company / McFarland, September 2013 ISBN 978-0-7864-4551-6.

The Renegade World Series

- Healer's Quest - Scholastic 1993; U.S. edition Mundania Press (December 2007); reprint released by Mundania June 2015 ISBN 978-1-60659-416-2
- Fire Wars - Scholastic (May 20, 1994); U.S. edition Mundania Press (2009); reprint released by Mundania July 2015 ISBN 978-1-60659-420-9
- Return of the Wizard - Point (May 19, 1995) ISBN 978-0-590-55857-0

The Factor Series

- Random Factor - Scholastic (Jun 16 1994) ISBN 978-0-590-55665-1
- Human Factor - Scholastic Point (Nov 15 1996) ISBN 978-0-590-13385-2
- Final Factor - Scholastic Children (Dec 11 1998) ISBN 978-0-590-19539-3

Children's Books

- Novellas: Sea Witch (1994) and Danger in Dallas (1993) Meulenfhoff Educatief.
- Turkey Creek Adventures Eternal Press 2009

Horror

- Sweet William - Pocket Books (November 1995) ISBN 978-0-671-88017-0
- Shadowdance - Pocket Books (Mar 1994) ISBN 978-0-671-78715-8
- Cradlesong - Pocket Books (May 1993) ISBN 978-0-671-73421-3
- Dark Lullaby - Pocket Books (May 1991) ISBN 978-0-671-70309-7

Short Stories

- Dissolutions, November 2015, Dissolutions.
- Heavenly Bodies, December 1998, Infinity Plus.
- What the Dickens, Substance Magazine, September 1995.
- Cinderella Revisited, Weirdbook, W. Paul Ganley Publishing, Summer 1994.
- No Good Turn, Dark Hour, Summer 1994.
- Full Moon Rising, London Noir,(anthology) Serpent's Tail, June 1994.
- Ortygia, Interzone, September 1994.
- Lex Talonis, Royal Crimes (anthology), New American Library, New York, June 1994.
- Just Desserts, Constable New Crimes 2 (anthology), Constable, London; June 1994.
- Presentiment's Hands, Peeping Tom magazine, Fall 1993.
- Last Laugh, Weirdbook, Fall 1993;
- Quiet is the Night, Vampire Stories (anthology) Michael O'Mara Books, Ltd, October 1992.
- Redemption, Constable New Crimes, (anthology) Constable, September, 1992.
- The Tape, Final Shadows (anthology) released by Doubleday in 1991.
- The Gift, October 1990 issue of Cemetery Dance.
- Graven Images, March 1990 of Fear magazine.
