= Matt Palmer =

Matt Palmer may refer to:

- Matt Palmer (baseball) (born 1979), American baseball pitcher
- Matthew Palmer (diplomat), American diplomat
- Matt Palmer (director), director of the 2018 film Calibre
- Matt Palmer (footballer) (born 1995), English footballer for Notts County
- Matthew Palmer (born 1964), New Zealand judge, legal academic and public servant
- Matthew Palmer (footballer), New Zealand footballer
