= Frederick John Palmer =

British photographer

Frederick John Palmer (1901–1990) was a photographer and Associate of the Royal Photographic Society, who contributed to the National Buildings Record during the Second World War and, later, the National Monuments Record.

== Biography ==
Palmer was born in 1901, the birth registered in the second quarter of the year in Wangford, Suffolk. The 1911 United Kingdom Census shows the family living in Newmarket and comprising Frederick senior, Sarah Elizabeth, his wife and their three children: Frederick John, aged 10; Beryl Elizabeth, aged 7 and Richard, aged 5.

It appears Palmer stayed in this locality and married Annie Whistler in Brandon, Suffolk, on 7 May 1932. The marriage was registered at Thetford.

Palmer's interest in photography and work as a photographer led to him becoming an Associate of the Royal Photographic Society in 1951.

== Legacy ==
During the Second World War Palmer became involved with the National Buildings Record. This project was set up to systematically photograph strategic and other important buildings should they suffer destruction or damage from enemy bombing. A significant collection of images taken by him can be found in the archives of Historic England. This collection includes 91 photographic prints and 23 negatives. One image of a man carrying a yoke in front of buildings in Tonbridge, Kent taken in 1942, includes a fellow photographer, Herbert Felton, in the background. Felton was the first photographer to be taken on by the National Buildings Record in 1941.

The National Buildings Record was acquired by the National Monuments Record (NMR) in 1996. In this later archive Palmer's images of negatives and prints number 203 and were taken between 1944 and 1966. These are mainly architectural photographs, ecclesiastical and secular, with a number of interiors recorded. The locations are mostly in the south east of England, East Anglia, Derbyshire and Bristol. These are also to be found in the archives at Historic England.

Photographs attributed to Palmer appear in the Conway Library Collection at the Courtauld Institute of Art. Images held in this collection are mainly architectural photographs.

Palmer died in 1990.
