= Debbie Palmer =

American woman who disappeared in 1970

- Born: Deborah Palmer; 1951
- Disappeared: September 8, 1970; North Dallas, Texas, U.S.
- Education: Palm Springs High School
- Occupation: Model
- Height: 5 ft 8 in (173 cm)
- Parent: Ann Palmer

Debbie Palmer was an American teenager, the daughter of actress Ann Palmer and worked as a model in California and Texas before her disappearance in the fall of 1970 shortly before her 19th birthday.

== Early life and career ==
Palmer was born in 1951, the only child of actress and model Ann Palmer, who become a single mother after leaving her college sweetheart-husband in Dallas. When Debbie was three years old her mother moved them from Dallas to Hollywood, with frequent stays with Ann's parents in Terrell, Texas, where Debbie and her cousin Sharon grew up like best friends. Debbie loved riding horses and competing in beauty pageants. She was a in Miss California contest and many Desert contests, placing in all. She won “Sweetheart of Mounted Police Rodeo” in 1969 and "World's Ideal Miss" of the Red River District's Our Little Miss pageant in 1970. She graduated from Palm Springs High School while working as a model in Los Angeles and Palm Springs, California. She intended to start college, but waited too late to register, so took a job in a Beverly Hills stock broker's office. Shortly before her 19th birthday, Debbie returned to the Dallas area, getting an apartment with a friend in the Carrawood complex in North Dallas, where her neighbors crowned her "Miss Carrawood".

== Disappearance ==
While Debbie lived in an apartment in Richardson, Texas. her mother was in Europe but received a call from her father, W.H. Palmer in Terrell, Texas that no one heard from Debbie in a week and was expected to be returning from a visit to Janet LaLanne, Jack's daughter but upon Sharon meeting her flight, she was not there. Ann Palmer trove to get a flight out of Düsseldorf, Germany but was delayed for a weekend, giving her hope she would get word Debbie was O.K. The following Monday, her mother took a flight from Europe to Dallas. For the month prior to her disappearance, Debbie had been visiting with the daughter of Jack LaLanne in Palm Springs and Hollywood.

Debbie Palmer was last seen at 8:30 p.m. on September 8, 1970, walking between apartments in the courtyard of the Carrawood Apartments. When she was reported missing four days later, the Dallas police told her family that they could not do anything about it as Debbie was over 18 years of age, despite the fact that within the previous year four other women had gone missing from the North Dallas area and been found dead, all beaten, stabbed, and mutilated before being left on the side of the road. Her mother believed that if Debbie was abducted it would have been someone she knew, as she knew and was friends with almost everyone in the area. At the end of September 1970, the Plano Police department called Ann Palmer to tell her that motorists discovered her daughter's suitcase and rings between Richardson and Plano, Texas. The police just wanted Ann to come pick them up and when she did Ann noticed that some of Debbie's items were missing, including her purse.

By April 1971, police in Texas suspected that they were dealing with a Serial killers or killers. Between Odessa and Dallas seven women had been murdered under similar circumstances and two, including Debbie, were missing. Captain Robert O. Dixon, head of the Dallas Police Department's homicide division said, "... we may have two or three, or even more, maniacs running loose." With the help of three psychiatrists a criminal profile was published in the local newspapers, "young man, 20-25, medium to small size, who recently suffered a severely damaging marital experience." Debbie wasn't found alive or dead and there were no other leads, so the case went cold. Lack of publicity may have been a factor in the lack of leads, as late as May 1972, Debbie was still being expected at pageants in the area. Her Mother, Ann Palmer, remained at her parents' home in Texas for almost a year before returning home to California, never giving up hope Debbie would be found through some unexplained circumstances.

== Aftermath ==
In 1996, Sightings (TV series) featured Debbie's story, bringing in psychic detective Dorothy Allison who then worked with Palmer's family friend and former Sheriff of Kaufman County, Texas, Roy Brockway. Brockway took Allison to Debbie's last known address as Allison wrote down her psychic impressions. According to Allison, Palmer was murdered by a jealous lover she had tried to break up the night of her disappearance and her body was dumped in a wooded area north of the area, the same area Debbie's suitcases had been found twenty-five years previous. She also wrote down several names, which were not made public but shown to Sharon (Debbie's cousin). Sharon confirmed that one of the names was the name of Debbie's boyfriend and that Debbie had confided in Sharon that she was going to "have a talk with him" about breaking up with him just before her disappearance. When Sharon took the psychic impressions to the Texas State Police with hopes that they would reopen the case based on them, Jim Chandler refused.

In 2015, Debbie's mother, Ann Palmer wrote a book about her relationship with her daughter, Intermingled Destinies Between a Mother and Daughter.
