= Sarah Palmer =

Sarah Palmer may refer to:

- Sarah R. Palmer (born 1943), professor of maritime history
- Sarah Worrall Lankford Palmer (1806–1896), American Methodist laywoman
- Sarah Palmer Young (1830–1908), married name Palmer, nurse during the American Civil War
- Sarah Palmer (Twin Peaks), a character in television series Twin Peaks
- Sarah Palmer (Halo), a character in the Halo video game series
- Sarah Palmer, a character in My Bloody Valentine 3D
