= Vernon Valentine Palmer =

American legal scholar

Vernon Valentine Palmer is an American-born legal scholar, the Thomas Pickles Professor of Law at Tulane University Law School and the co-director of its Eason Weinmann Center of Comparative Law. He is a specialist in civil law and mixed jurisdiction legal studies, with a primary focus on the study of comparative international law.

Palmer received in 2012 the degree of Docteur Honoris Causa by Paris-Dauphine University and received both the Palmes Académiques and, in 2006, the Legion of Honor from the French government. In 2022 he was honored by the International Academy of Comparative Law in Paris as one of the world's "great comparatists".

== Biography ==
Palmer was born in New Orleans, Louisiana, and attended New Orleans Academy, Newman High School and graduated from Jesuit High School in 1958.

He is a graduate of Tulane University (B.A. 1962, LL.B. 1965 with Law Review Honors) and Yale Law School (LL.M. 1966), where he received a Sterling Fellowship. Palmer graduated from Pembroke College, Oxford University in 1985, where he received his Doctorate of Philosophy. His Oxford dissertation was an historical study entitled The Paths to Privity: The History of Third Party Beneficiary Contracts at English Law.

== Publications ==
He is the author of numerous legal articles and books, including his most recent book "The Lost Translators of 1808 and the Birth of Civil Law in Louisiana (Georgia Univ. Press 2021). In addition to being active is his local New Orleans legal and political communities, Palmer has served as a constitutional advisor and consultant to the Kingdom of Lesotho and the Republic of Madagascar.

== Selected books ==
- Through the Codes Darkly—Slave Law and Civil Law in Louisiana (2012) ISBN 1616193115
- Mixed Jurisdictions Worldwide: The Third Legal Family (2012) ISBN 9780521768573
- Mixed Jurisdictions Compared: The Private Law of Louisiana and Scotland (co-editor, Elspeth Reid) (2009) ISBN 0748638865
- The Civil Law of Obligations—Louisiana Law with European Comparisons (2010) ISBN 3768045250
- Pure Economic Loss Beyond Europe: New Horizons in Comparative Law (co-editor, Mauro Bussani) (2008) ISBN 0415775647
- The Louisiana Civilian Experience: Critiques of Codification in a Mixed Jurisdiction (2005) ISBN 1594600600
- Strict Liability in Europe (co-editor, Franz Werro) (2004) ISBN 159460004X
- Pure Economic Loss in Europe (co-editor, Mauro Bussani) (2003) (translated into Chinese, Law Press China 2005) ISBN 0521180058
- Mixed Jurisdictions Worldwide: The Third Legal Family (2001) ISBN 0521033810
- Louisiana – Microcosm of a Mixed Jurisdiction (1999) ISBN 0890898928
- The Civil Law of Lease in Louisiana (1997)
- 'The Paths to Privity - The History of Third Party Beneficiary Contracts at English Law (1992) (reprinted Law Book Exchange 2006) ISBN 1584777206
- The Legal System of Lesotho (1972) (with Poulter)
- The Roman-Dutch & Sesotho Law of Delict (1970) (reprint Morija Press 2006)

=== Selected articles ===
- The Recusal of American Judges in the Post-Caperton Era: An Empirical Assessment of the Risk of Actual Bias in Decisions Involving Campaign Contributors
- Two Rival Theories of Mixed Legal Systems
- Double Reasoning in the Codified Mixed Systems - Code and Case Law as Simultaneous Methods
- The Comparative Law and Economics of Pure Economic Loss
- The Fate of the General Clause in a Cross-Cultural Setting: The Tort Experience of Louisiana (vol. 5.2, May 2001)
- Editorial - The Relevance and Allure of the Mixed Legal Systems (vol. 12, May 2008) Palmer, V.V., and M. Bussani
- Pure Economic Loss: The Ways to Recovery (vol. 11.3, December 2007)
- and John Levendis. The Louisiana Supreme Court in Question: An Empirical and Statistical Study of the Effects of Campaign Money on the Judicial Function Tul. L. Rev. 82 (2007): 1291.
- The Origins and Authors of the Code Noir La. L. Rev. 56 (1995): 363.
- The French Connection and the Spanish Perception: Historical Debates and Contemporary Evaluation of French Influence on Louisiana Civil Law La. L. Rev. 63 (2002): 1067.
