= Catherine Palmer =

American Christian novelist

Catherine Palmer is an American Christian novelist who grew up in Bangladesh and Kenya. She lives in New Mexico with her husband, Tim. They have two grown sons. She is a graduate of Southwest Baptist University and holds a master's degree in English from Baylor University. Her first book was published in 1988. Since then, she has published nearly 60 novels, many of them national best sellers. Catherine has won numerous awards for her writing, including the Christy Award, the highest honor in Christian fiction. In 2004, she was given the Career Achievement Award for Inspirational Romance by Romantic Times magazine. More than three million copies of Catherine's novels are currently in print.

== Novels ==
- "The Prairie Trilogy," comprising Prairie Rose (1997) ISBN 0-8423-7056-0, Prairie Fire (1998) ISBN 0-8423-7057-9, and Prairie Storm (1999) ISBN 0-8423-7058-7.
- Finders Keepers (1999) ISBN 0-8423-1164-5
- The Happy Room (2002) ISBN 0-8423-5422-0
- A Dangerous Silence (2001) ISBN 0-8423-3617-6
- Fatal Harvest (2003) ISBN 0-8423-7548-1
