= Chris Palmer =

Chris Palmer may refer to:

- Chris Palmer (American football) (born 1949), American football coach
- Chris Palmer (film producer) (born 1947), environmental and wildlife film producer and director
- Chris Palmer (footballer) (born 1983), English footballer
- Chris Palmer (Nova Scotia politician), Canadian politician
- Chris Palmer (Prince Edward Island politician), Canadian politician

== See also ==
- Christopher Palmer (1946–1995), English film score arranger, historian, biographer
- Christopher Palmer (born 1985), American author, educator, pastor
