= Raymond Palmer =

Raymond or Ray Palmer may refer to:

- Raymond A. Palmer, science-fiction writer and editor
- Raymond F. Palmer, medical professor
- Raymond Palmer, 3rd Baron Palmer (1916–1990), British peer and businessman
- Ray Palmer (pastor), American pastor and author of hymns
- Ray Palmer (Arrowverse), a TV show character based on his comic book counterpart
- Atom (Ray Palmer), a DC Comics comic book character

== See also ==
- Raymond the Palmer (1139/40–1200), Catholic pilgrim
