= Eddie Palmer =

Eddie Palmer may refer to:

- Eddie Palmer (baseball) (1893–1983), third baseman in Major League Baseball
- Eddie Palmer (boxer), African American boxer
