= 2003 North Devon District Council election =

2003 UK local government election

Map of the results of the 2003 North Devon council election. Liberal Democrats in yellow, Conservatives in blue, independent in grey and United Kingdom Independence Party in purple.

The 2003 North Devon District Council election took place on 1 May 2003 to elect members of North Devon District Council in Devon, England. The whole council was up for election with boundary changes since the last election in 1999 reducing the number of seats by 1. The Liberal Democrats stayed in overall control of the council.

== Election result ==
The results saw the Liberal Democrats keep their majority on the council with 22 seats, but the Conservatives gained 5 seats to move to 10 councillors. Overall turnout in the election was 45%.

North Devon local election result 2003
Party	Seats	Gains	Losses	Net gain/loss	Seats %	Votes %	Votes	+/−
Liberal Democrats	22			-5	51.2	41.9	16,164	-5.8%
Conservative	10			+5	23.3	31.1	11,996	+7.2%
Independent	10			-2	23.3	24.6	9,487	+2.0%
UKIP	1			+1	2.3	1.4	559	+1.4%
Green	0			0	0	0.7	286	+0.7%
BNP	0			0	0	0.3	118	+0.3%

4 Liberal Democrat and 1 independent candidates were unopposed.

== Ward results ==
Bickington & Roundswell (2)
Party	Candidate	Votes	%	±%
Conservative	Rodney Cann	573	51.3	
Liberal Democrats	Carol McCormack-Hole	385	34.4	
Conservative	Colin Brown	362	32.4	
Liberal Democrats	Ronald Ellerton	343	30.7	
Independent	Charles Piper	315	28.2	
Turnout		1,118	35.0	

Bishop's Nympton
Party	Candidate	Votes	%	±%
Independent	Eric Ley	789	77.7	
Liberal Democrats	Gerald Eva	226	22.3	
Majority		563	55.4	
Turnout		1,015	69.32	

Bratton Fleming
Party	Candidate	Votes	%	±%
Liberal Democrats	Malcolm Prowse	589	64.0	
Conservative	Richard Peek	331	36.0	
Majority		258	28.0	
Turnout		920	65.50	

Braunton East (2)
Party	Candidate	Votes	%	±%
Independent	Douglas Lucas	580	44.8	
Conservative	Philip Daniel	554	42.7	
Liberal Democrats	Derrick Spear	444	34.3	
Liberal Democrats	Elizabeth Spear	420	32.4	
Conservative	Geraldine Neale	328	25.3	
Turnout		1,296	44.61	

Braunton West (2)
Party	Candidate	Votes	%	±%
Conservative	Jasmine Chesters	507	37.6	
Liberal Democrats	Marguerite Shapland	462	34.2	
Liberal Democrats	Letitia Sellwood	449	33.3	
Independent	Susan Lynch	397	29.4	
Conservative	Sallieanne Tingey	364	27.0	
Independent	Peter Manning	328	24.3	
Turnout		1,350	44.13	

Central Town (Barnstaple) (2)
Party	Candidate	Votes	%	±%
Liberal Democrats	Faye Webber	568	55.2	
Liberal Democrats	John Wilsher	519	50.4	
Conservative	Simon Harvey	350	34.0	
Conservative	Christopher Gifford	301	29.3	
Independent	Paul Dyer	164	15.9	
Turnout		1,029	31.26	

Chittlehampton
Party	Candidate	Votes	%	±%
Independent	Albert Cook	unopposed		
Turnout		0	N/A	

Chumleigh
Party	Candidate	Votes	%	±%
Liberal Democrats	Kevin Butt	495	56.0	
Conservative	Terence Pincombe	389	44.0	
Majority		106	12.0	
Turnout		884	54.16	

Combe Martin (2)
Party	Candidate	Votes	%	±%
Liberal Democrats	Yvette Gubb	957	57.3	
Liberal Democrats	Julia Clark	839	50.2	
Conservative	Susan Sussex	810	48.5	
Conservative	Arthur Yelton	513	30.7	
Turnout		1,671	56.45	

Forches & Whiddon Valley (2)
Party	Candidate	Votes	%	±%
Independent	Laurence Haydn-Higgins	374	40.1	
Liberal Democrats	Francis Ovey	298	31.9	
Liberal Democrats	Valerie Monk	279	29.9	
Independent	James Bartlett	261	28.0	
Conservative	Susan McCrum	167	17.9	
Independent	Beresford Bawden	166	17.8	
Turnout		933	29.90	

Fremington (2)
Party	Candidate	Votes	%	±%
Independent	Roy Morrish	603	49.7	
Independent	Peter Mullen	500	41.2	
Independent	David Harris	318	26.2	
Conservative	John Gill	312	25.7	
Conservative	Andrew Day	274	22.6	
Liberal Democrats	Ronald Taylor	109	9.0	
Liberal Democrats	Arthur Windsor	105	8.6	
Turnout		1,214	36.90	

Georgeham & Mortehoe (2)
Party	Candidate	Votes	%	±%
Liberal Democrats	Malcolm Wilkinson	512	46.0	
Conservative	Ernest Evans	500	45.0	
Liberal Democrats	William Foster	489	44.0	
Conservative	Anthony Turner	482	43.3	
Turnout		1,112	36.87	

Heanton Punchardon
Party	Candidate	Votes	%	±%
Conservative	Andrea Davis	244	54.0	
Liberal Democrats	Brian Jewell	208	46.0	
Majority		36	8.0	
Turnout		452	33.60	

Ilfracombe Central (2)
Party	Candidate	Votes	%	±%
Independent	Ivan Frances	503	47.8	
Independent	Richard Campbell	394	37.4	
Independent	Franklin Pearson	389	36.9	
Independent	Tony Cooper	292	27.7	
Independent	David Williams	244	23.2	
Turnout		1,053	33.97	

Ilfracombe East
Party	Candidate	Votes	%	±%
Independent	Michael Edmunds	308	38.4	
Conservative	Carol Slinn	258	32.2	
Independent	Albert Furber	139	17.3	
Independent	Ann Rhodes	97	12.1	
Majority		50	6.2	
Turnout		802	46.26	

Ilfracombe West (2)
Party	Candidate	Votes	%	±%
Liberal Democrats	Geoffrey Fowler	696	55.3	
Independent	David Spear	573	45.5	
Independent	Brian Cotton	373	29.6	
Independent	Christine Tomlinson-Smith	316	25.1	
Independent	Keith Thompson	235	18.7	
Turnout		2,193	37.41	

Instow
Party	Candidate	Votes	%	±%
Conservative	Lynn Brown	220	35.3	
Liberal Democrats	Patricia Ford	214	34.3	
Independent	Reginald Cane	190	30.4	
Majority		6	1.0	
Turnout		624	48.3	

Landkey, Swimbridge & Taw (2)
Party	Candidate	Votes	%	±%
Liberal Democrats	David Butt	unopposed		
Liberal Democrats	Alan Rennles	unopposed		
Turnout		0	N/A	

Longbridge (2)
Party	Candidate	Votes	%	±%
UKIP	Michael Pagram	559	41.8	
Conservative	David Brailey	538	40.3	
Independent	Pamela Holland	475	35.6	
Liberal Democrats	Rodney Hawes	284	21.3	
Liberal Democrats	Paulene Godfrey	264	19.8	
Independent	Nicholas Magnum	164	12.3	
Turnout		1,336	43.32	

Lynton & Lynmouth
Party	Candidate	Votes	%	±%
Liberal Democrats	John Travis	733	88.0	
Conservative	John Walley	100	12.0	
Majority		633	76.0	
Turnout		833	59.50	

Marwood
Party	Candidate	Votes	%	±%
Liberal Democrats	Frederick Tucker	413	55.6	
Conservative	Mary Farrer	330	44.4	
Majority		83	11.2	
Turnout		743	55.28	

Newport (2)
Party	Candidate	Votes	%	±%
Conservative	Henry Harrison	431	41.2	
Liberal Democrats	Brian Macbeth	416	39.8	
Liberal Democrats	Diana Piercy	408	39.0	
Conservative	David Simpson	391	37.4	
Green	Richard Knight	286	27.3	
Turnout		1,046	36.13	

North Molton
Party	Candidate	Votes	%	±%
Conservative	Richard Edgell	495	50.1	
Liberal Democrats	Michael Nelson	375	38.0	
BNP	Peter Chantler	118	11.9	
Majority		120	12.1	
Turnout		988	61.99	

Pilton (2)
Party	Candidate	Votes	%	±%
Liberal Democrats	Brian Greenslade	753	64.8	
Liberal Democrats	Mair Manuel	717	61.7	
Conservative	Malcolm Keene	353	30.4	
Conservative	John Jones	333	28.66	
Turnout		1,162	41.05	

South Molton (2)
Party	Candidate	Votes	%	±%
Liberal Democrats	Ernest Moore	969	65.7	
Liberal Democrats	Susan Sewell	870	59.0	
Conservative	Jeremy Yabsley	469	31.8	
Conservative	Douglas Dowling	332	22.5	
Turnout		1,474	48.00	

Witheridge
Party	Candidate	Votes	%	±%
Conservative	Nancy Lewis	385	52.0	
Liberal Democrats	Catherine Palmer	356	48.0	
Majority		29	4.0	
Turnout		741	44.30	

Yeo Valley (2)
Party	Candidate	Votes	%	±%
Liberal Democrats	Christopher Haywood	unopposed		
Liberal Democrats	Colin Payne	unopposed		
Turnout		0	N/A	

== By-elections ==
Georgeham & Mortehoe (14 July 2005)
Party	Candidate	Votes	%	±%
Liberal Democrats	Derrick Spear	384	43.5	−0.5
Conservative	Douglas Green	378	42.8	−2.2
Green	Michael Harris	121	13.7	N/A
Turnout		884	28	
Liberal Democrats gain from Conservative		Swing		

Forches & Whiddon Valley (15 September 2005)
Party	Candidate	Votes	%	±%
Liberal Democrats	Janet Carter	307	62.5	+30.6
Conservative	Simon Harvey	120	24.4	+6.5
Green	Earl Bramley-Howard	35	7.1	N/A
Independent	Charlie Piper	29	5.9	N/A
Turnout		494	15	
Liberal Democrats hold		Swing		
