= Roger Palmer =

Roger Palmer may refer to:

- Roger de Palmer, MP for City of London 1316 and 1318
- Roger Palmer, 1st Earl of Castlemaine (1634–1705), English courtier, diplomat and MP, 1660
- Sir Roger Palmer (MP, born 1577) (1577–1657), English MP at various times between 1614 and 1644
- Sir Roger Palmer, 1st Baronet (1729–1790), Anglo-Irish politician
- Sir Roger Palmer, 5th Baronet (1832–1910), member of the UK Parliament for Mayo, 1857–1865
- Roger Palmer (footballer) (born 1959)
- Roger Palmer (conservationist), founder of the UK Wolf Conservation Trust
