= Gary Palmer (choreographer) =

American choreographer of modern dance (born 1951)

Gary Palmer (born 1951) is an American choreographer of modern dance.

== Career ==
Gary Palmer began his career in the 1970s as a San Francisco–based dancer with the Lucas Hoving Performance Group, the San Francisco Opera Ballet, and Christopher Beck & Company Dance Theater. In the late 1970s, he performed in numerous works by Beck, from "Night Vision" (1976) to "Unspoken" (1979).

In 1977 Palmer set up the nonprofit Centerspace Dance Foundation to support Centerspace, an alternative dance venue that he founded at Project Artaud. He also organized his own troupe, Gary Palmer Dance Company, for which Centerspace served as home base until the early 1990s. Palmer's choreography for Gary Palmer Dance Company is highly kinetic, featuring open balletic movement in tension with tighter gestures. He developed his dance sequences in response to his dancers' individual strengths rather than setting predetermined movement on them. The result is choreography with strong theatrical values and frequent speed changes reminiscent of the work of Lucinda Childs. By the late 1990s, he was being called a "key performer and innovator in the San Francisco contemporary dance scene". Over the years, Palmer has worked with many musicians, including Jay Cloidt, Pamela Z, Paul Dresher, and Christopher Fulkerson. Dancers in his company have included Betsy Ceva, Jonny McPhee, Robert Allen, Charles Chism, and Melissa Moss.

In 1982, Palmer inaugurated a series called “Men Dancing” that featured only male dancers and choreographers in order to "give male dance artists a creative space outside of traditional roles (as partners to ballerinas) or archetypes (heroes or villains)". With works by Remy Charlip and José Limón alongside lesser-known choreographers, it became a popular annual event in the Bay Area, offering a forum for meditations on gay culture ranging from the oblique to the confrontational to the formal. In 1993, Palmer received an Isadora Duncan Dance Award for founding this long-running series, which lasted through 1998.

In 1991, Gary Palmer moved his company from San Francisco to San Jose, where he performed at various South Bay venues such as the Mountain View Center for the Performing Arts. He toured his company to Lima, Peru, in 1996 and subsequently collaborated with the Ballet Nacional de Peru on the 'Americas Series', which premiered at the Montgomery Theater in San Jose in 1997.

In 1997, Palmer was hired to be the executive director of the nonprofit San Jose Dance Theatre, which he subsequently merged with his own company to form a combined entity that included both a professional company and a classical ballet school intended to serve around 150 students. In 1999, two dancers and some crew members from a production of "The Nutcracker" done the previous year filed a lawsuit alleging that they had not been paid for their work. The lawsuit further alleged that money from ticket sales had been used instead to pay some old debts of the Gary Palmer Dance Company. Gary Palmer resigned as executive director of the company at the end of 1998. The lawsuit was dismissed in September 2000.

== Choreography ==
- "Natural Selection" (1998)
- "Una Venganza" (1998, based on a short story by Isabel Allende)
- "Blue Lizard Highway" (1997)
- "Mad Jigs and Broken Shadows" (ca. 1996)
- "White Stone Wings" (1995)
- "Unguarded Hours" (1994)
- "The Truth About Cinderella (1990)
- "Love It to Death" (1990)
- "The Opposites, On Ascent and Descent, and the Fool Sought After (1988)
- "Stormy Weather" (1988)
- "Aphelion" (1988)
