= Disappearance of Kevin Palmer =

1999 disappearance

Kevin Palmer
- Born: Kevin John Palmer
- Disappeared: 12 March 1999 (age 37); Curdridge, Hampshire, England, UK
- Status: Missing for 26 years, 11 months and 24 days
- Occupation: timeshare salesman
- Children: 1

Kevin John Palmer was a 37-year-old British timeshare salesman who vanished without a trace in Curdridge, Hampshire on 12 March 1999.

== Background into disappearance ==
Kevin Palmer worked as a timeshare salesman in Málaga, Spain, where his wife and daughter lived with him. For reasons that were never explained, he travelled to the UK on 12 March 1999 with the intention of visiting Newcastle, but in fact went to Titchfield in Hampshire instead. He spent the evening of 12 March at the Abshot Hotel and Country Club with at least four other people, before getting a taxi to Bishop's Waltham with two men (John Howett and Juan Arribas) and a woman. An argument broke out however between Palmer and his two male companions, and the trio left the cab. Arribas and Howett returned to the cab without Palmer and drove off. Palmer was never seen again. His suitcase was never recovered, nor was the taxi driver ever identified.

== Developments ==
Howett and Arribas claimed that they fought with Palmer and left him lying on the ground of an industrial estate, still alive.

In 2003, Hampshire police stated that they were treating Palmer's disappearance as suspicious. Howett was arrested and his home was searched for clues, although he was never charged due to insufficient evidence. At the time, Howett was serving a 12-year sentence for drug smuggling. Another man was interviewed in Spain. A 2009 inquest into Palmer's disappearance resulted in an open verdict, since the coroner felt there was not enough evidence of unlawful killing, although he did also accuse Howett and Arribas of not telling the truth. Witnesses told conflicting stories of what happened afterwards - either Palmer died and his corpse was buried; or alternatively he recovered, went to Newcastle and was never seen again. In 2014, police searched the garden of a pub in Fareham for evidence that Palmer was buried there, but found no clues.

== See also ==
- List of people who disappeared mysteriously (2000–present)
