= Eric Palmer (cricketer) =

English cricketer (1931–2019)

Personal information
- Full name: Eric John Palmer
- Born: 16 June 1931; Romford, Essex, England
- Died: 2019 (aged 87–88); Havering, England
- Batting: Left-handed
- Bowling: Right-arm fast-medium

Domestic team information
- Years: Team
- 1957: Essex
- 1955: Berkshire

Career statistics
Competition	First-class
Matches	4
Runs scored	39
Batting average	39.00
100s/50s	–/–
Top score	11*
Balls bowled	432
Wickets	7
Bowling average	32.14
5 wickets in innings	–
10 wickets in match	–
Best bowling	2/35
Catches/stumpings	1/–
- Source: Cricinfo, 21 November 2011

Eric John Palmer (16 June 1931 – 2019) was an English cricketer. He was a left-handed batsman who bowled left-arm fast-medium. Palmer was born at Romford, Essex.

== Biography ==
Palmer played Second XI cricket for Essex in 1955, as well as making a single appearance for Berkshire in that seasons Minor Counties Championship against Devon. He played for the Essex Second XI the following season, before making his first-class debut for Essex in the 1957 County Championship against Gloucestershire. He made three further first-class appearances in that season, against Surrey, Somerset and Gloucestershire. In what was to be his only first-class appearances for the county, Palmer took 7 wickets at an average of 32.14, with best figures of 2/35. With the bat he scored a total of 39 runs, with a high score of 11 not out. Over the coming decade he played infrequently for the Essex Second XI, playing his final matches for them in 1967.

Palmer died in Havering in 2019.
