= Sandra Palmer (entrepreneur) =

Jamaican business executive (born 1983)

Sandra Marie Palmer
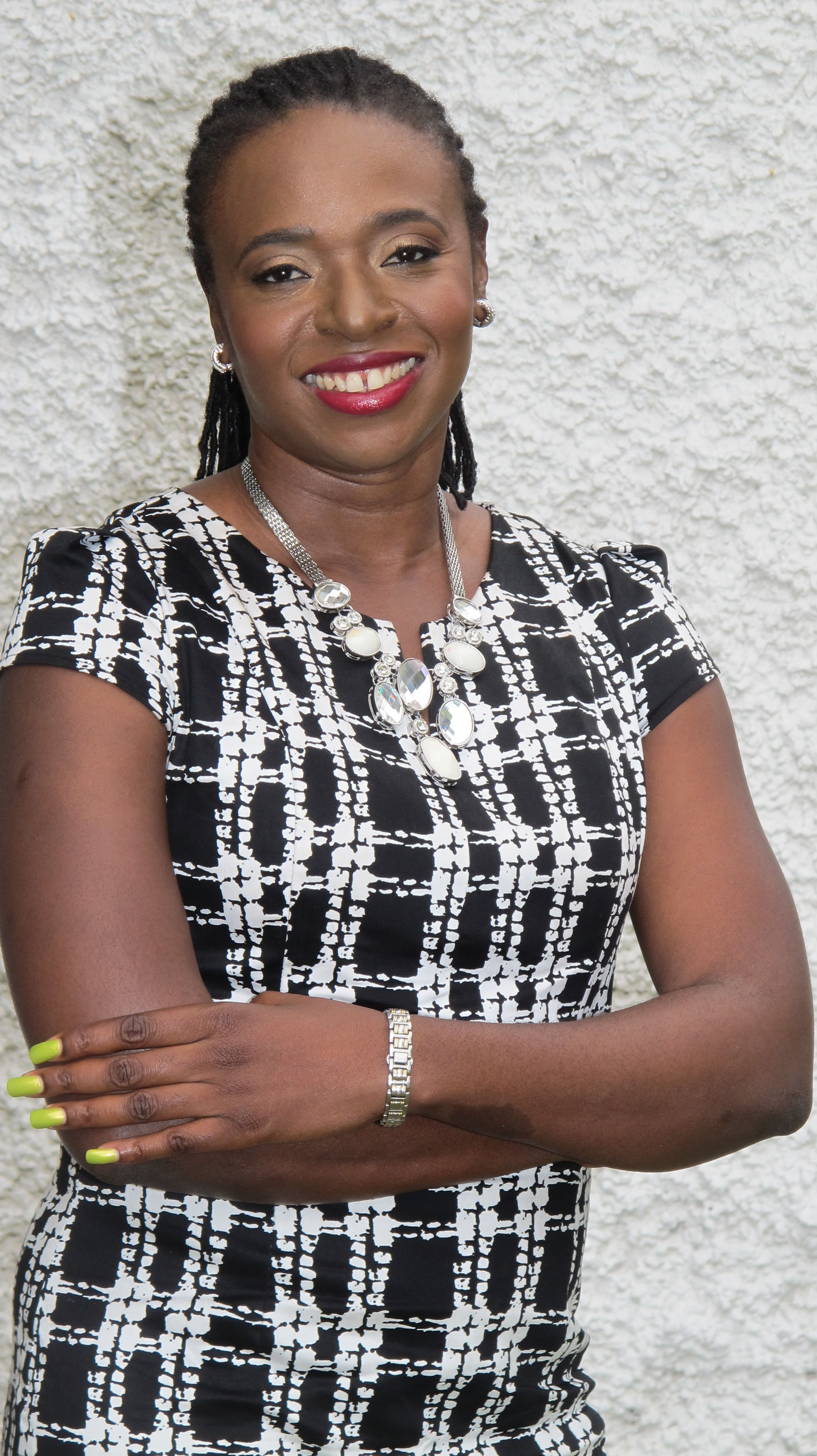
- Citizenship: Jamaican
- Education: Bishop Gibson High School for Girls
- Alma mater: University of the West Indies, Mona (BA); Nova Southeastern University (MBA, DBA)
- Occupations: Entrepreneur, university lecturer, business consultant
- Title: CEO and senior partner, Above or Beyond

Sandra Marie Palmer is a Jamaican entrepreneur, who has been CEO of Above or Beyond (formerly The JobBank) since 2017. She is also known as Sandra Palmer-Peart.

== Early life and education ==
Palmer was born in Topsham, Manchester Parish, Jamaica and attended Bishop Gibson High School for girls in Mandeville. After working briefly in the banking sector, Palmer began pursuing tertiary education in 1989 at the University of the West Indies, Mona. She graduated, earning a Bachelor of Arts . In 1997, Palmer earned her Master of Business Administration from the Nova Southeastern University at the H. Wayne Huizenga School of Business and Entrepreneurship, where she specialized in General Management. In 2004, she completed her doctorate in business administration from the same school, with the dissertation: "A Study of the Inclination of Jamaican Employees to Opt for Telework: A Comparison with Findings for United Kingdom Employees.”

== Career ==
Palmer worked at the National Commercial Bank for four years until she resigned in 1990 to focus on her university education. After completing her first degree, she began working at the information technology firm WTG-APTEC. In 1996, she left and joined GraceKennedy’s InfoGrace team as a corporate account executive. In October 1997, Palmer launched SSP APTEC Limited in Kingston, Jamaica, an information technology company providing audio-visual equipment.

The World Bank’s 2010 report Women’s Economic Opportunities in the Formal Private Sector in Latin America and the Caribbean included Palmer as a case study on female entrepreneurship in Jamaica.

In August 2017, Palmer became CEO and senior partner at Above or Beyond (formerly The JobBank), the corporate brand of Leahcim T. Semaj and Company Limited. The organization aims to build upon its history in the field of human capital development by enhancing its internal capacity and expanding its presence throughout the Caribbean and Florida. Her role is to leverage her experience in business and academia to lead the organization.

Palmer began her career in education at Jamaica College as a teacher of Caribbean history. She left after one semester, but returned to education in 2006 when she became a lecturer at the University of the West Indies, Mona School of Business and Management, and also at Northern Caribbean University, College of Business and Hospitality Management.
