= Charles Palmer =

Charles Palmer may refer to:

== Politicians ==
- Charles Fyshe Palmer (1769–1843), British member of parliament for Reading
- Charles Palmer (MP for Bath) (1777–1851), English military officer and member of parliament for Bath
- Sir Charles Palmer, 1st Baronet (1822–1907), English shipbuilder, businessman and Liberal member of parliament, 1874–1907
- Charles Palmer (journalist) (1869–1920), British journalist, newspaper editor and member of parliament for The Wrekin, 1920

== Sportspeople ==
- Charles Palmer (sport shooter) (1869–?), British Olympic sport shooter
- Charles Palmer (cricketer) (1919–2005), English cricketer and cricket administrator
- Charles Palmer (judoka) (1930–2001), British judoka
- Charlie Palmer (footballer) (born 1963), retired professional footballer in England

== Other people ==
- Charles Palmer (banker), governor of the Bank of England, 1754–1756
- Sir Charles Palmer, 2nd Baronet (1771–1827), English landowner
- Charles John Palmer (1805–1882), English historian
- Charles Palmer (engineer) (1847–1940), survivor of the siege of Lucknow
- Charles M. Palmer (1856–1949), American Midwest newspaper broker
- Charles Forrest Palmer (1892–1973), Atlanta real estate developer, head of housing authority and chamber of commerce
- Charles D. Palmer (1902–1999), U.S. Army general
- Charlie Palmer (chef) (born 1959), American chef
- Charles Palmer (director) (born 1965), British television director

== See also ==
- Charles Nicholas Pallmer (1772–1848), British member of parliament
