= Tim Palmer =

Tim Palmer may refer to:

- Tim Palmer (film historian) (born 1975), English film historian
- Tim Palmer (journalist), Australian journalist
- Tim Palmer (1943–1997), British technology journalist, see Computergram International
- Tim Palmer (physicist) (born 1952), English physicist
- Tim Palmer (record producer) (born 1962), British record producer
