= Marion Palmer =

Norwegian writer

Marion Annie Palmer (born 11 January 1953 in Hammerfest) is a Norwegian author. She is based in the village of Kvalsund in Hammerfest Municipality in Finnmark county.

In the 1970s, Palmer was involved in the ml movement and AKP. She worked for 14 years as a factory worker at Friogrill in Trondheim, where she became active in industrial relations, and for a time was site foreman.

She made her debut with the poetry collection Alle pikene løper til vinduet about life as she saw it from the window of the fish-processing factory.

== Bibliography ==
- Alle pikene løper til vinduet, poetry, prose (1995)
- Utsatte strøk, poetry and prose (1999)
- Guttaperka, novel (2002)
- Bare kirka sto igjen, stories from the war in Finnmark (2010)
