= Eugene Palmer =

Eugene Palmer may refer to:

- Eugene Palmer (fugitive) (born 1939), American fugitive
- Eugene Palmer (artist) (born 1955), Jamaican-born British artist
- Joey Palmer (1859–1910), Australian cricketer also known as Eugene Palmer
