= Joseph Palmer =

Joseph or Joe Palmer may refer to:

- Joe Palmer (football manager) (c. 1890–?), British football manager
- Joe Palmer (politician), Republican Idaho State Representative
- Joseph Palmer (American Revolutionary War general) (1716–1788)
- Joseph Palmer (communard) (1791–1874), American Transcendentalist and member of the Fruitlands commune, who was persecuted for wearing a beard
- Joseph Palmer II (1914–1994), American foreign service officer and ambassador
- Joseph B. Palmer (1825–1890), American lawyer, legislator, and Confederate general in the American Civil War
- Joseph Palmer (priest) (1749–1829), Irish Anglican priest
- Joseph Palmer (writer) (1756–1815), English writer
