= Geoffrey Palmer =

Geoffrey Palmer may refer to:

== Politicians ==
- Sir Geoffrey Palmer, 1st Baronet (1598–1670), English lawyer and politician
- Sir Geoffrey Palmer, 3rd Baronet (1655–1732), English politician, member of parliament (MP) for Leicestershire
- Geoffrey Palmer (MP for Ludgershall) (1642–1661), briefly member of parliament for Ludgershall
- Geoffrey Palmer (New Zealand politician) (born 1942), New Zealand politician and lawyer, prime minister of New Zealand, 1989–1990

== Others ==
- Geoffrey Palmer (actor) (1927–2020), English actor
- Geoff Palmer (footballer) (born 1954), English footballer
- Geoff Palmer (scientist) (1940–2025), professor of grain science
- Geoffrey Palmer (real estate developer) (born 1950), American real estate developer
- Geoffrey Molyneux Palmer (1882–1957), Irish composer
- Geoff Palmer (musician) (born 1980), pop punk and folk punk musician
- Geoffrey Palmer, co-wrote the Huey Lewis and the News song "Couple Days Off"

== See also ==
- Jeffrey D. Palmer, professor at Indiana University Bloomington
