= Alfred Palmer =

Alfred Palmer may refer to:

- Alfred Palmer (businessman) (1852–c. 1936), member of the Palmer family, proprietors of the Huntley & Palmers biscuit manufacturer
- Alfred Brian Palmer (1899–1993), Royal Navy Reserve captain
- Alfred Neobard Palmer (1847–1915), chemist and local historian
- Alfred T. Palmer (1906–1993), war photographer
