= Harvard "Pete" Palmer Jr. =

Harvard E. "Pete" Palmer Jr. is a prominent national authority on promotion and operation of car donation programs for charitable causes. He is "arguably one of the individuals with the broadest knowledge of the far-flung vehicle donation industry." He is a spokesperson for the Vehicle Donation Coalition. His writing includes an op-ed piece in The San Francisco Examiner about how to choose a worthy cause for donating a car, citing California's State Registrar of Charitable Trusts as a source for checking the records of particular charities soliciting in that state.

== Lobbying actions on behalf of industry ==
In 1998, Palmer joined with other California car donation industry leaders to promote state legislation designed to bring about more transparent donation reporting. Five years later, the General Accounting Office interviewed Palmer regarding the federal regulatory legislation that became part of the Jobs Bill 2004. He was instrumental in forming an industry lobby about that bill. Though that lobby disbanded in 2005, Palmer has helped bring together a new, politically oriented coalition of charities, call centers, auctions, and others to address difficulties associated with the car donation aspects of the Jobs Bill. That work continues today. In 2003, Palmer's organization joined with the National Auto Dealers Association ("NADA"), a major vehicle-information resource, to form a partnership that simplified what was previously a difficult auto-donation process.

In 2009, Palmer and some charities lobbied against extension of the federal government's "Cash for Clunkers" program, which had hurt donations for charitable purposes. Palmer's work with nonprofit organizations has raised over $60 million with 800,000 donations for about 400 worthy causes in North America. Such charities include the Polly Klaas Foundation; the Red Cross and the National Kidney Foundation; and other organizations benefiting animals, the arts, children, education, the environment, family services, health, human rights, seniors, and faith-based activities.

== Development of expertise ==
A San Francisco Bay Area advertising executive since the early 1970s, he had a client who went out of the furniture business and started the vehicle donation program for Volunteers of America. The client turned to Palmer to run some radio ads for that program. Eventually, Palmer and his client joined forces to try to help many other charities with car donation operations. While successfully pursuing more traditional business careers, Palmer and his partner noted the donation legislation when it first came out of Congress in 1986 and hoped they could find a way to use the new charity donation methodology and their accumulated skills to help important causes. In 1996, they began work with their first client, the Polly Klaas Foundation; today, Palmer gets eight to ten weekly inquiries from charities wanting his Vehicle Donation Processing Center, Inc., to operate one of these programs.

== Philosophy ==
Charities are not the only beneficiaries of car donation programs. "[Charity] is a part of everybody’s thinking, and certainly it is the big part of what we believe; but for most people . . . the primary motivator . . . [is] a one-time garbage-removal service," Palmer has said. Ninety-nine percent of cars donated to Palmer's Vehicle Donation Processing Center are older, dilapidated cars. Sixty percent of cars donated through the Center will no longer start. Because of his philosophy that he is helping donors as well as charities, Palmer's organization, unlike others, accepts the great majority of them, "no matter how crummy that car might be," and even if the amount generated per vehicle is small.

Others of the 10 or 12 large charitable vehicle processors in the country are choosier than Palmer is, accepting only vehicles that generate more profit, perhaps at a used car lot. Almost all Palmer's cars are sold at auction, and the average gross sales price is around $400. The charities pay nothing for the processing services and get 50 percent of the net sales price. They are happy to get half that small amount, as opposed to 100 percent of nothing, he says. Palmer believes that auctions allow for multiple bidders and transparency of transactions. No one is guaranteed to make money, but the charity is guaranteed not to lose any.

Palmer is a staunch believer in the positive environmental aspects of car donation programs. Many donated cars have been running inefficiently or steadily leaking fluids on the street or, worse, over bare ground. The processing center contracts for their removal on multi-car carriers, minimizing towing trips. Cars are taken to licensed facilities to be tested and improved in ways that lessen their environmental impact. If the car is unworthy of repair, the fluids are drained and recycled, as are all the metals. If the car does go back on the road, it is tuned up and given properly inflated tires, and then recycled to someone who, perhaps, could not afford a new car.

== How vehicle donation processors operate ==
Car-donation service providers like Palmer's simplify charitable vehicle contributions by providing "one-stop shopping for giving away those worn wheels." Many such organizations operate online and by toll-free telephone. They take care of nationwide soliciting and advertising, picking up the vehicle and minor reconditioning, DMV title paperwork, auctioning donated cars, accounting, designation of a donatee charity, and payment to the charity. The charity gets cash, while the donor takes a tax deduction for the donation. (Under current rules, donors can deduct up to $500 from their federal taxes without proof of value.) Vehicles accepted include cars, trucks, boats, vans, RVs, trailers, motorcycles, and even airplanes and real estate.
