= C. Phil Palmer =

British palaeontologist

C. Philip Palmer is a palaeontologist at the Natural History Museum in London. He has worked extensively on molluscs of various types including scaphopods, bivalves and cephalopods.
