= Scot Palmer =

Australian rules football journalist (1937–2022)

- Born: 25 March 1937
- Died: 15 January 2022 (aged 84)
- Occupations: Sports journalist, columnist
- Known for: AFL coverage

Scot Palmer (25 March 1937 – 15 January 2022) was an Australian sports journalist.

== Early life ==
Palmer was the only son of sports and crime reporter Clyde Palmer, who worked on the Morning Post, The Sun News-Pictorial and The Truth. He was educated at Trinity Grammar School.

== Journalism career ==
Palmer started as a copy boy on The Sun News-Pictorial in 1954, covering a wide variety of general work before winning the Herald & Weekly Times overseas scholarship and moving on to sport. Best known for his work on Australian rules football, he was one of the founders and a president of the Football Writers Association, now the AFL Media Association.

He also covered nine Olympics as well as Wimbledon tennis.

Palmer appeared with Jack Thompson in the football movie The Club, playing the role of a reporter.

A long-time writer for The Sun, the Sunday Press, Sunday Sun and Sunday Herald Sun, Palmer was best known as the presenter of the "Punchlines" segment on Channel 7 on Sundays. He also appeared on the Seven Network as a regular during half-time breaks of Australian Football League matches and on HSV7's Sunday football panel over two decades. His catch-cry, "Keep on punchin'", and relays back to commentators Peter Landy and Sandy Roberts made him even more well known.

== Honours ==
A member of the MCG Media Hall of Fame, he retired from the Sunday Herald Sun as associate editor in 2008 but was retained by The Herald and Weekly Times to continue writing his "Punchlines" column.

== Personal life and death ==
Palmer was married to Lorraine Palmer, with whom he had two children. He died on 15 January 2022, at the age of 84.
