= Cornelius S. Palmer =

American judge (1844–1932)

Cornelius Solomon Palmer (November 2, 1844 – June 11, 1932) was an American soldier and lawyer who served in the Vermont House of Representatives from 1880 to 1882, as a justice of the Dakota Territorial Supreme Court from 1884 to 1888, and in the South Dakota Senate from 1894 to 1895.

== Early life and military service ==
Born in Underhill, Vermont, Palmer was frail as a youth and frequently ill. At age 17, he sought to enlist in the Union Army during the American Civil War, despite being underage and without parental permission. To do so, he forged his father's signature on a consent form and enlisted under the name of his older brother, Simeon M. Palmer, in Company F of the 13th Vermont Infantry Regiment in 1862. He served throughout the regiment's term of enlistment and participated in the Battle of Gettysburg, where he drew a short straw to undertake a mission to retrieve water for his company, narrowly escaping fire from a Confederate sharpshooter. During the regiment's subsequent pursuit of Confederate forces, Palmer discovered the sharpshooter's body at the foot of a tree, apparently killed by a Union Army counterpart.

Palmer was mustered out of service under his brother's name. Decades later, in 1898, he petitioned the War Department to correct the military records, obtaining affidavits from others with whom he had served to prove his identity, and receiving a discharge in his own name from Secretary of War Redfield Proctor, who noted that this was likely the final Civil War volunteer discharge ever issued.

== Legal and political career ==
After the war, Palmer returned to Vermont, where he taught school and read law under LaFayette Wilbur in Jericho Corners. Palmer was admitted to the Chittenden County Bar in 1870. He served as State's Attorney for Chittenden County from 1876 to 1877 and was elected to the Vermont House of Representatives in 1880, representing Jericho, Vermont.

In 1882, Palmer was appointed Assistant United States Attorney for Dakota Territory. Two years later, on the recommendation of Senator George F. Edmunds, he was appointed an associate justice of the Supreme Court of Dakota Territory by President Chester A. Arthur, and was confirmed by the United States Senate on February 28, 1884. He served in that capacity until 1888, thereafter resuming private practice in Sioux Falls, South Dakota. He was elected to the South Dakota Senate in 1894 and 1895. In 1889, he also served as Department Commander of the South Dakota Grand Army of the Republic.

Palmer returned to Vermont in 1904, settling first in Burlington, where he practiced law in partnership with Congressman David J. Foster. Around 1917, he moved to Plainfield, New Jersey, where he lived in retirement until his death in 1932.

== Personal life and death ==
In 1870, Palmer married Annis R. Fassett, with whom he had one daughter and one son. Annis died in 1901, and Palmer remarried to Mary K. Marshall of New York City. Palmer died at his home in New Jersey at the age of 87, and was buried at Hillside Cemetery, Scotch Plains, New Jersey.

Political offices
Preceded by Newly established seat	Justice of the Dakota Territorial Supreme Court; 1884–1888	Succeeded by Court reconfigured
