= Melissa Palmer =

American hepatologist (born 1958)

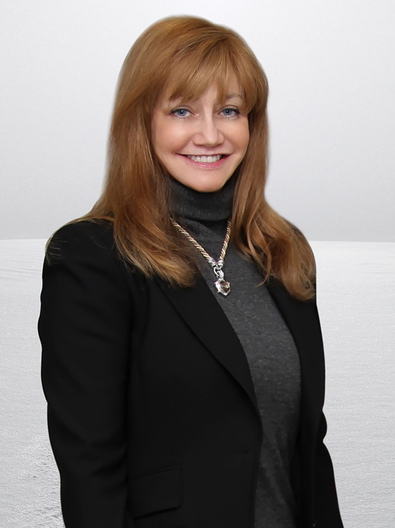
- Palmer in November 2009
- Born: August 29, 1958 (age 68); New York City, U.S.
- Education: Medical Degree, Mount Sinai School of Medicine; Residency in Internal Medicine, Mount Sinai Beth Israel; Fellowship in Hepatology, Mount Sinai School of Medicine; Fellowship in Gastroenterology, Stony Brook University Hospital
- Occupation: Hepatologist
- Spouse: Alan Pressman (m. 1987)

Melissa Palmer (born August 29, 1958) is an American hepatologist recognized for her research and treatment of hepatitis and liver disease.

== Early life and education ==
Palmer attended Columbia University, where she obtained a Bachelor of Science. She attended medical school at the Mount Sinai School of Medicine, where she received a Doctor of Medicine degree in 1985.

== Career ==
Palmer completed her internship and residency at Mount Sinai Beth Israel in Manhattan, New York, from 1985 to 1988, and completed a fellowship in hepatology at Mount Sinai. Palmer also completed a gastroenterology fellowship at Stony Brook University Hospital.

In 1990, Palmer published research in Gastroenterology demonstrating that if an overweight person who has liver-related abnormalities loses 10% of their body weight, it corrects these findings. Palmer has also authored or co-authored several guidelines with colleagues from the Food and Drug Administration (FDA) concerning how to detect, assess and manage suspected drug induced liver injury (hepatotoxicity) among patients participating in clinical trials.

Palmer's 2000 book Dr. Melissa Palmer's Guide to Hepatitis & Liver Disease is notable for being a comprehensive book on liver disease written for both the general public and health care practitioners. The book provides information about the function of the liver, liver blood tests, the symptoms and treatment of various liver diseases, cirrhosis, liver cancer, and the influence of lifestyle on liver disease. The book has been translated into several languages, including Spanish and Chinese. In 2011, Palmer co-authored and co-edited The Gastrointestinal and Liver Disease Nutrition Desk Reference with colleagues from Johns Hopkins Hospital in Baltimore.

Palmer became the Chief Medical Officer of Gannex Pharma in Dec 2020. Prior to joining Gannex, she was Head of Liver Disease Clinical Development at Takeda Pharmaceutical Company. She has also held leadership positions at Shire Pharmaceuticals and Kadmon Corporation, where she was in charge of the global development of programs regarding metabolic dysfunction associated steatohepatitis (MASH) and other liver diseases. Prior to joining the pharmaceutical industry, she was clinical professor at NYU Langone Medical Center. From 1991 to 2011, Palmer operated a solo medical practice focused on liver disease.

== Selected publications ==
=== Books ===
- "Dr. Melissa Palmer's Guide to Hepatitis & Liver Disease"—New Revised Edition May 2004. (PenguinRandomHouse—Avery Division) ISBN 9781583331880; Chinese version July 2008. (Jilin Press, Jilin China)
- "Dr. Melissa Palmer's Guide to Hepatitis & Liver Disease"—Original Edition January 1, 2000. (PenguinRandomHouse—Avery Division) ISBN 9781422350898; Taiwanese version 2001
- "The Gastrointestinal and Liver Disease Nutrition Desk Reference", edited by Gerard Mullin, Laura Matarese and Melissa Palmer. Sept. 2011. (CRC Press) ISBN 9781439812648

=== Chapters ===
- "Integrative Weight Management: A Guide for Clinicians (Nutrition and Health)"—Chapter on Non-Alcoholic Fatty Liver Disease. Gerald E. Mullin (Editor). May 2014. (Humana Press) ISBN 9781493905478
- "Textbook of Natural Medicine" 4th Edition—Chapter 173, on Hepatitis. Sept. 2012. (Elsevier) ISBN 9781437723335
- "Encyclopedia of Plagues, Pestilence and Pandemics"—Chapter on Hepatitis. Oct. 2008 (Greenwood Press) ISBN 9780313341014
- "Encyclopedia of Science and Technology"—Chapter on Cirrhosis. Feb. 2007. (McGraw-Hill) ISBN 9780071441438
- "The Autoimmune Connection"—Chapter on AutoImmune Hepatitis/PBC. April 2016. (McGraw-Hill) ISBN 9780071841221

== Awards and distinctions ==
- Fellow of AASLD, 2014–present
- Medical Advisory Board, Greater New York Chapter of the American Liver Foundation, 1991–present
- Editorial Board, Practical Gastroenterology, 2009–present
