= Kate Palmer =

Australian sport administrator

Kate Palmer AM
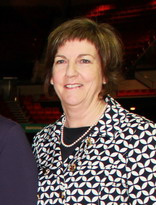
- Palmer in 2010

Chief Executive Officer of the Australian Sports Commission
- In office 2017–2020
- Preceded by: Simon Hollingsworth
- Succeeded by: Kieren Perkins

Chief Executive Officer of Netball Australia
- In office 2007–2016
- Preceded by: Lindsay Cane
- Succeeded by: Marne Fechner

Personal details
- Born: Kate Palmer Shepperton, Victoria, Australia
- Education: Royal Melbourne Institute of Technology; Deakin University
- Occupation: Sports administrator; business executive

Kate Palmer AM is an Australian sport administrator. She was the chief executive officer of the Australian Sports Commission from January 2017 to January 2020. Previous to this appointment, she was chief executive officer of Netball Australia.

Palmer has been a leading figure in netball and Australian sport since the early 1990s. Palmer grew up in Shepparton, Victoria. She played netball for Victoria. Palmer has a Honours Degree in Applied Science from Royal Melbourne Institute of Technology and a Masters of Sport Management from Deakin University.

Palmer was the chief executive of Netball Victoria from 2000 to 2006. In 2007, she was appointed chief executive of Netball Australia and resigned in November 2016. In announcing Palmer's appointment as chief executive officer of the Australian Sports Commission, Minister for Sport, Sussan Ley stated "This is the first female appointment to the role in the ASC’s 31 years of operation, which is a significant personal achievement and milestone for Australian sport. Palmer has an exceptional track record and is well placed to meet the challenges and opportunities of the future of sport in Australia."

Palmer's roles outside netball include chair of the Victorian Institute of Sport (2010-2016), trustee of the Melbourne Cricket Ground (2004-2015), director of the International Netball Federation (2011-2015), director of TTNL Ltd (ANZ Championship 2008-current), panel member of the Australian Sports Anti-Doping Authority Advisory Committee (2010-2014), ambassador of ConnectGV and director of Australian Commonwealth Games Association (2011).

== Recognition ==
Palmer was awarded the AIS Sport Performance Awards Leadership Award for 2014 with Damien Marangon.

In the 2019 Queen's Birthday Honours Palmer was appointed a Member of the Order of Australia (AM) in recognition of her "significant service to sports administration".
