= Frederick F. Palmer =

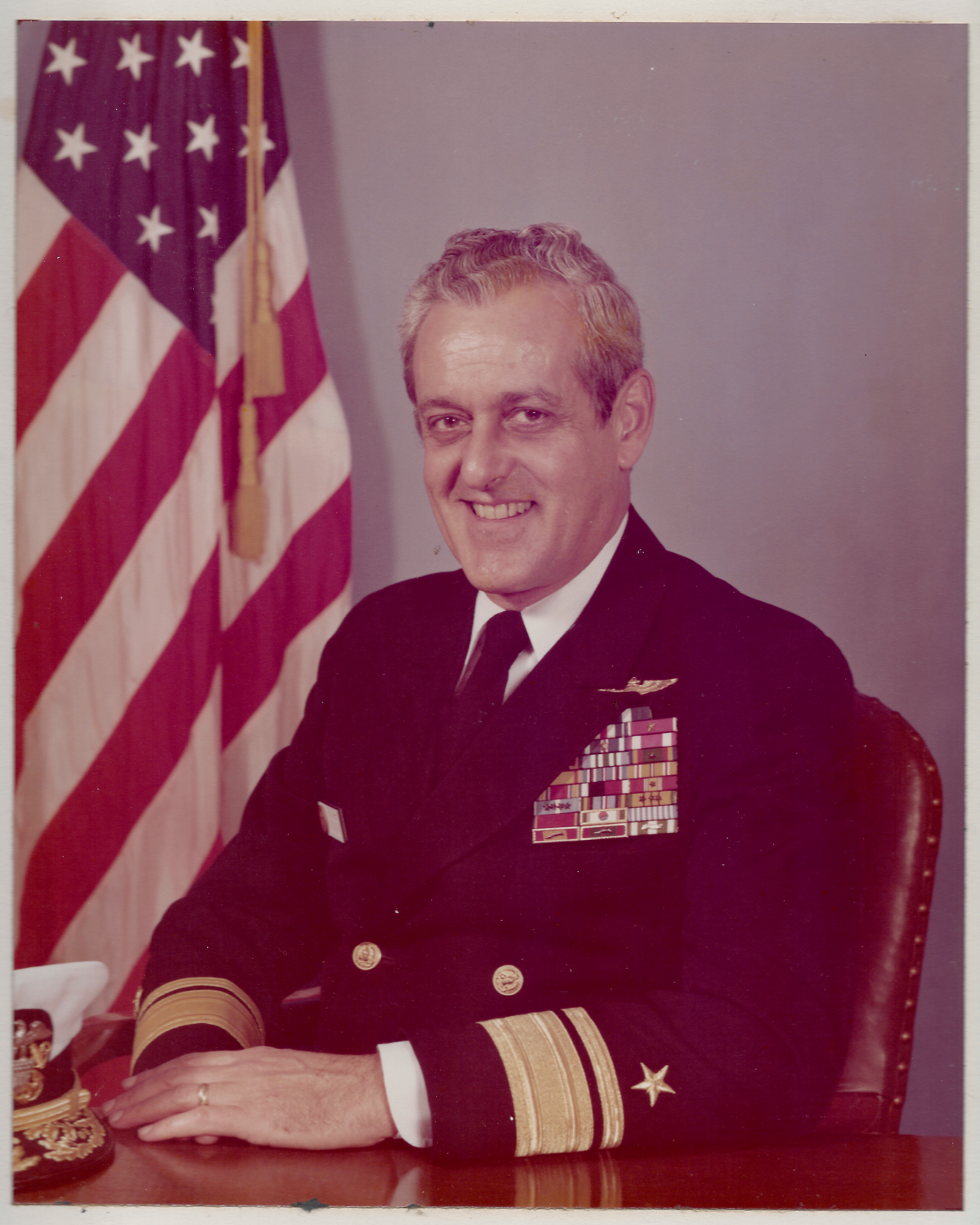
- RADM Palmer in 1979
- Born: July 14, 1925; Lakewood, Ohio
- Died: January 2, 1992 (aged 66); Virginia Beach, Virginia
- Military career
- Allegiance: United States
- Branch: United States Navy
- Rank: Rear Admiral
- Commands: United States Naval Reserve; Carrier Air Wing Fourteen
- Conflicts: Vietnam War
- Awards: Navy Cross; Silver Star; Distinguished Flying Cross (2)

Frederick Fraser Palmer (July 14, 1925 – January 2, 1992) was a rear admiral in the United States Navy. He was chief of the United States Naval Reserve from September 1978 until October 1982. Prior to that he was commander and pilot with Attack Carrier Air Wing 14 (CVW-14) on the USS Ranger (CVA-61) while deployed to Southeast Asia in 1966, the Skipper of the USS Raleigh (LPD-1) from 4 Oct 1969 to 7 Sep 1970, and the Commandant of the Fourth Naval District in headquartered in Philadelphia, Pennsylvania. His awards included the Navy Cross, Silver Star and Distinguished Flying Cross for service in Vietnam in 1966.
