= 1995 Birthday Honours =

British royal awards

The Queen's Birthday Honours 1995 were appointments by some of the 16 Commonwealth realms to various orders and honours to recognise and reward good works by citizens of those countries. The Birthday Honours are awarded as part of the Queen's Official Birthday celebrations during the month of June.

The honours were announced on 16 June 1995 in the United Kingdom, and on 5 June 1995 in New Zealand, Barbados, Grenada, Papua New Guinea, Solomon Islands, Saint Lucia, Belize, Antigua and Barbuda, and Saint Kitts and Nevis.

The recipients of honours are displayed as they were styled before their new honour and arranged by the country (in order of precedence) whose ministers advised the Queen on the appointments, then by honour with grades i.e. Knight or Dame Grand Cross before Knight or Dame Commander, and by division i.e. civil, diplomatic, and military as appropriate.

== United Kingdom ==
=== Life Peers ===
- Sir James Blyth, Deputy Chairman and Chief Executive, Boots Company.
- Sir John Graham Cuckney, Chairman, Orion Publishing Group.
- The Most Reverend Robert Henry Alexander Eames, Archbishop of Armagh and Primate of All Ireland.
- The Most Reverend The Right Honourable John Stapylton Habgood, Archbishop of York.

=== Privy Counsellor ===
- Robert James Atkins, Member of Parliament for South Ribble and Minister of State for the Environment and the Countryside, Department of the Environment.
- David John Maclean, Member of Parliament for Penrith and the Border and Minister of State, Home Office.
- Thomas Galloway, Baron Strathclyde, Government Chief Whip in the House of Lords and Captain of the Honourable Corps of the Gentlemen-at-Arms.

=== Knight Bachelor ===
- Michael Bett, CBE. For services to training and to personnel management.
- The Right Honourable Christopher John Chataway, Chairman, Civil Aviation Authority. For services to the aviation industry.
- Michael John Cobham, CBE, Chairman, Cobham plc. For services to the defence industry.
- Howard Montagu Colvin, CVO, CBE. For services to architectural history.
- Julian Michael Gordon Critchley, Member of Parliament for Aldershot. For political service.
- Anthony James Dowell, CBE, Artistic Director, Royal Ballet. For services to ballet.
- John Richard Gray Drummond, CBE, Director, BBC Promenade Concerts. For services to music.
- Professor Ian Derek Gainsford, Dean, Kings College Medical and Dental School. For services to medical and dental education.
- Richard William George, Chairman and Managing Director, Weetabix Ltd. For services to the food industry.
- Martin John Gilbert, CBE. For services to British history and to international affairs.
- Robert Norman Gunn, DL, Chairman, Further Education Funding Council for England. For services to further education.
- Professor John Bertrand Gurdon, FRS, FMedSci, John Humphrey Plummer Professor of Cell Biology, University of Cambridge. For services to developmental biology.
- Ronald Hadfield, QPM, DL, Chief Constable, West Midlands. For services to the police.
- Terence Harrison, DL, Chief Executive, Rolls-Royce plc. For services to the engineering industry and to export.
- Alan Gordon Barraclough Haselhurst, Member of Parliament for Saffron Walden. For political service.
- Michael Holt, CBE. For political service.
- Peter John Hunt, Chairman and Managing Director, Land Securities. For services to the property industry.
- William Robert Patrick (Robin) Knox-Johnston, CBE, RD*. For services to yachting.
- Geoffrey Lofthouse, MP, First Deputy Chairman of Ways and Means, House of Commons.
- Professor Michael John Peckham, Director of Research and Development, Department of Health. For services to medicine.
- Professor Ghillean Tolmie Prance, FRS, Director, Royal Botanic Gardens, Kew. For scientific services to conservation.
- Cliff Richard, OBE, Entertainer. For charitable services.
- Derek Harry Roberts, CBE, FRS, Provost, University College London. For services to engineering.
- Sydney Wylie Samuelson, CBE, Commissioner, British Film Commission. For services to the film industry.
- Professor John Calman Shaw, CBE, Chairman, Scottish Higher Education Funding Council. For services to higher education.
- Julian Michael Shersby, Member of Parliament for Uxbridge. For political service.
- David Alec Gwyn Simon, CBE, Group Chief Executive and Deputy Chairman, British Petroleum. For services to the oil industry.
- William Royden Stuttaford, CBE. For political service.
- Christopher Rupert Walford, Lord Mayor of London. For services to the City of London.
- Professor Glanmor Williams, CBE. For services to the history, culture and heritage of Wales.

==== Diplomatic and overseas list ====
- Mr. Justice Harold Grant Platt, Judge of Appeal, Supreme Court of Uganda.
- Professor David Todd, CBE, JP, President of the Council of the Academy, Hong Kong.

=== The Most Honourable Order of the Bath ===
==== Knight Grand Cross of the Order of the Bath (GCB) ====
- Sir Terence Burns, Permanent Secretary, Her Majesty's Treasury.

==== Knight Commander of the Order of the Bath (KCB) ====
===== Military division =====
====== Royal Navy ======
- Vice Admiral Robert Walmsley

====== Army ======
- Lieutenant General Michael John Dawson Walker, CBE (481887), late The Royal Anglian Regiment

====== Royal Air Force ======
- Air Marshal John Shakespeare Allison, CBE, Royal Air Force.

===== Civil division =====
- David Fell, CB, Head of the Northern Ireland Civil Service.
- James Moray Stewart, CB, Second Permanent Secretary, Ministry of Defence.

==== Companion of the Order of the Bath (CB) ====
===== Military division =====
====== Royal Navy ======
- Rear Admiral Richard Oran Irwin
- Rear Admiral John Gordon Tolhurst

====== Army ======
- Major General Scott Carnegie Grant (479236), late Corps of Royal Engineers.
- Major General Frederick Brian Mayes (464204), late Royal Army Medical Corps.
- Major General Raymond Austin Pett, MBE (469078), late The King's Own Royal Border Regiment.
- Major General Peter John Sheppard, CBE (471351), late Corps of Royal Engineers

====== Royal Air Force ======
- Air Vice-Marshal Peter George Beer, CBE LVO, Royal Air Force.
- Air Vice-Marshal Colin George Terry, OBE, Royal Air Force.

===== Civil division =====
- John Sale Beastall, Grade 3, Her Majesty's Treasury.
- James David Prydeaux Bickford, lately Legal Adviser to the Security Service.
- Christopher David Butler, Director, Department for National Savings.
- Clive William Corlett, Deputy Chairman, Her Majesty's Board of Inland Revenue.
- Julian Smyth Crozier, Chief Executive, Training and Employment Agency, Department of Economic Development, Northern Ireland.
- Antony John Goldman, Grade 3, Department of Transport.
- Martin Howe, Director, Competition Policy, Office of Fair Trading, Department of Trade and Industry.
- Roger Tustin Jackling, CBE, Grade 2, Ministry of Defence
- Ian Alistair Johnston, Director General, TEED, Department of Employment.
- John Duncan Lowe, Crown Agent, Crown Office, Scotland.
- Dinah Alison Nichols, Grade 2, Department of the Environment.
- Anthony David Osborne, lately Grade 3, Treasury Solicitor's Department.
- His Honour Judge James William Rant, QC, The Judge Advocate General, Lord Chancellor's Department.
- Guy Stapleton, Chief Executive, Intervention Board Executive Agency, Ministry of Agriculture Fisheries and Food.
- Roger Hill Warren, lately Managing Director (Programmes), Defence Research Agency, Ministry of Defence.
- Rosemary Jane Wool, Director of Health Care, Prison Service, Home Office.
- David Charles Lynn Wroe, Deputy Director, Central Statistical Office

=== The Most Distinguished Order of Saint Michael and Saint George ===
==== Knight Grand Cross of the Order of St Michael and St George (GCMG) ====
- Sir Nicholas Maxted Fenn, KCMG, High Commissioner, New Delhi

==== Knight Commander of the Order of St Michael and St George (KCMG) ====
- Gerald Chierici Warner, CMG, Deputy Secretary, Cabinet Office
- Roger John Carrick, CMG LVO, High Commissioner, Canberra.
- David Murray Elliott, CB, Director General (Internal Market), General Secretariat of the Council of European Union.
- Andrew Marley Wood, CMG, H.M. Ambassador-designate, Moscow

==== Companion of the Order of St Michael and St George (CMG) ====
- Professor John Brand Free. For services to beekeeping worldwide.
- Michael George Bawden, Head of British Development Division in the Caribbean.
- Andrew Carter, lately Deputy Governor, Gibraltar.
- Anthony David Harris, LVO, H.M. Ambassador, Abu Dhabi.
- Thomas George Harris, H.M. Ambassador, Seoul.
- Gavin Wallace Hewitt, H.M. Ambassador, Zagreb
- David John Johnson, CVO, High Commissioner, Georgetown.
- Peter Alfred Penfold, OBE, Governor of the British Virgin Islands.
- Ivor Anthony Roberts, Chargé d'Affaires, Belgrade.
- Michael Godfrey Thickett, Counsellor, Foreign and Commonwealth Office.
- Michael Charles Wood, lately Counsellor (Legal Adviser) UK Mission to the United Nations, New York

=== Royal Victorian Order ===
==== Dames Commander of the Royal Victorian Order (DCVO) ====
- The Lady Mary Katharine Mumford, CVO, Lady in Waiting to Princess Alexandra, the Honourable Lady Ogilvy.

==== Knights Commander of the Royal Victorian Order (KCVO) ====
- The Right Honourable Gustavus Michael George Hamilton-Russell, Viscount Boyne, Lord in Waiting to The Queen.
- The Very Reverend William James Morris, JP, Dean of the Chapel Royal in Scotland.
- Richard Hanbury-Tenison, Lieutenant of Gwent.

==== Commanders of the Royal Victorian Order (CVO) ====
- Air Commodore the Honourable Timothy Charles Elworthy, CBE, Senior Air Equerry, Royal Air Force. Lately Captain of The Queen's Flight.
- Lieutenant Colonel Peter Evan Wyldbore Gibbs, LVO, Private Secretary to The Princess Royal.
- Elizabeth Anne, Mrs. Griffiths, LVO, Librarian and Archivist to The Duke of Edinburgh.
- Group Captain John Arthur Guinness Slessor, Gentleman Usher to The Queen.
- Major General Sir David Calthrop Thorne, KBE, Director General of the Commonwealth Trust.
- Professor Christopher John White. For services to the Royal Collection.

==== Lieutenants of the Royal Victorian Order (LVO) ====
- Jane Valerie Joan Astell, MVO, Royal Liaison Assistant, British Broadcasting Corporation.
- Geoffrey Bignell. For personal services to The Prince of Wales.
- Judith Lynne, Mrs. Hill, Partner, Farrer and Company.
- Patrick Desmond Christian Jenny Jephson, Private Secretary to The Princess of Wales.
- Lieutenant Colonel Sean O'Dwyer, Private Secretary to The Prince Edward.
- Donald Pennington, Senior Press Officer, Central Office of Information (South West).
- Priscilla Jane Stephanie, The Honourable Mrs. Roberts, MVO, Curator of the Print Room, Windsor Castle.
- Timothy Willatt Slack, Principal, Cumberland Lodge, Windsor Great Park.
- Wing Commander Neil Thurston, Royal Air Force. Lately Commanding Officer, The Queen's Flight.

==== Members of the Royal Victorian Order (MVO) ====
- Inspector Kenneth Atmore, Royal and Diplomatic Protection Department, Metropolitan Police.
- Inspector Brian John Baston, Royalty and Diplomatic Protection Department, Metropolitan Police.
- Captain Anthony John Bull, RD*, Harbour Master, Port of London Authority.
- Evelyn Florence, Mrs. Elliott. For personal services to Queen Elizabeth The Queen Mother.
- Patricia Jane Foye, lately Secretary to the Newspaper Society.
- Squadron Leader Anthony Howard Guttridge, MBE, Royal Air Force. For services to The Queen's Flight.
- Squadron Leader Robert Fifield King, Royal Air Force. For services to The Queen's Flight.
- Anne Cynthia, Mrs. Lansiaux, lately Secretary to the Librarian, Royal Library, Windsor Castle.
- Theresa-Mary Morton, Assistant Curator (Exhibitions), Print Room, Windsor Castle.
- Stuart Cyril Stagey, Senior Clerk, Master of the Household's Department, Buckingham Palace.
- Sergeant Brian Thorne, Royalty and Diplomatic Protection Department, Metropolitan Police.
- Arleen Valerie, Mrs. Vince, Lady Clerk, Private Secretary's Office, Buckingham Palace.
- Desmond Kenneth Waite, lately Consultant Architect to Sandringham Estate.
- Janet Ellen Weir, lately Secretary to Defence Services Secretary.
- Gerald Stanley Wharton, Manager, Ceremonial and Protocol Services, Public Works and Government Services, Canada.
- Irene Ann, Mrs. White., Private Secretary to the Lieutenant Governor of Saskatchewan.
- Sergeant Barry John Wilkinson, Royalty and Diplomatic Protection Department, Metropolitan Police.

=== Order of the Companions of Honour (CH) ===
- Sir Denys Louis Lasdun, CBE. For services to architecture.
- Sir Nevill Francis Mott, FRS. For services to science.

=== The Most Excellent Order of the British Empire ===
==== Dame Commander of the Order of the British Empire (DBE) ====
- Joyce Anne, Mrs. Anelay, OBE. For political and public service.
- Josephine Clare Barstow, CBE, Opera Singer. For services to music.
- Professor Margaret June Clark. For services to nursing.
- Elizabeth Anne Loosemore, Mrs. Esteve-Coll, Director, Victoria and Albert Museum.
- Carla, Lady Thorneycroft. For political service.

==== Knight Commander of the Order of the British Empire (KBE) ====
===== Diplomatic service and overseas =====
- John Walton David Gray, CMG, H.M. Ambassador, Brussels.
- Wilfred Patrick Thesiger, CBE DSO. Explorer and author.

==== Commander of the Order of the British Empire (CBE) ====
===== Military division =====
- Captain Richard Geoffrey Hastilow, Royal Navy.
- Commandant Nursing Officer Jane Titley, RRC, Queen Alexandra's Royal Naval Nursing Service.
- Brigadier John William Martin Kincaid (469036), late Royal Regiment of Artillery.
- Colonel Maurice Charles Hornby Manners-Smith (485784), late The Royal Green Jackets.
- Brigadier Rodney Clive Walker (480420), late Royal Regiment of Artillery.
- Group Captain James Andrew Collier, Royal Air Force.
- Acting Air Commodore Michael Leonard Feenan, OBE, Royal Air Force.
- Air Commodore Valentine Brinley Howells, Royal Air Force.

===== Civil division =====
- Donald Watson Adams, Grade 4, Crown Prosecution Service.
- Professor Thomas Harry David Arie, Foundation Professor of Health Care of the Elderly, University of Nottingham. For services to medicine.
- George Harvey Bardwell, lately Personnel Director, Benefits Agency.
- Alan Arthur Bates, Actor. For services to drama.
- George Bennett, Corporate Vice President, Motorola. For services to manufacturing in Scotland.
- Professor Gordon Purves Blair, Professor of Mechanical Engineering, The Queen's University of Belfast. For services to engineering education.
- Professor Robert Saul Bluglass, Professor of Forensic Psychiatry, University of Birmingham. For services to medicine.
- Jonathan A. Bodlender, Chairman, Horwath UK Limited. For services to tourism.
- John Robert Bosnell, Grade 5, Foreign and Commonwealth Office.
- Professor Frederick John Bourne, Director, Institute for Animal Health. For services to science.
- William Powell Bowman, OBE, Chairman, Covent Garden Market Authority. For services to the New Covent Garden Market.
- Professor Alasdair Muir Breckenridge. For services to medicine and to health care.
- Helen Grace Mary, Lady Brook, President, Brook Advisory Centres. For services to family planning.
- David McPherson Broome, OBE. For services to show jumping.
- Michael John, Baron Brougham and Vaux. For political services.
- Professor Michael John Bruton. For services to the University of Wales College, Cardiff.
- David Martin Burridge, Director, European Centre for Medium Range Weather Forecasts. For services to weather forecasting.
- Raymond Montague Burton, Vice President, Jewish Museum. For charitable services to museums.
- Alan Calder, Research and Development Manager, Zeneca Specialities. For services to science.
- Edward Arthur John Carr, Chief Executive, CADW.
- Robert Angus Clark, Director (Distribution), Sainsbury's, and lately President, Freight Transport Association. For services to the freight transport industry.
- Andrew John Collier, Chief Education Officer, Lancashire. For services to education.
- John William Corrin, Her Majesty's First Deemster and Deputy Governor, Isle of Man. For services to the community on the Isle of Man.
- Timothy Robert Cutler, Director General, Forestry Commission.
- Professor Kay Elizabeth Davies, Research Scientist, Institute of Molecular Medicine, University of Oxford. For services to science.
- Professor Rodney Deane Davies, lately Professor of Physics, University of Manchester and Director, Nuffleld Radio Astronomy Laboratories, Jodrell Bank. For services to radio astronomy.
- Nicholas John Durlacher, Chairman, London International financial Futures Exchange. For services to the finance industry.
- Carol Jacqueline Ellis (Mrs. Gilmore), QC, Editor, the Law Reports. For services to the legal profession.
- James Evans, Council Member, Newspaper Society and Director, Press Standards Board of Finance. For services to the newspaper industry.
- Colin Foxall, Managing Director, NCM Credit Insurance Ltd. For services to export credits.
- Professor Raoul Norman Franklin, Vice Chancellor, City University, London. For services to higher education.
- Elizabeth Fritsch, Potter. For services to art.
- Rex William Gaisford, Director, Development, Amerada Hess. For services to the oil industry.
- Frederick Gareth Robert Gimblett, OBE, Chair, Care Sector Consortium, Occupational Standards Council for Health and Social Care. For services to health and social care.
- Gerald Henry Gordon, QC, Sheriff of Glasgow and Strathkelvin.
- Peter William Greenwood, Group Managing Director, Molins plc. For services to manufacturing industry.
- Angela Rae, Mrs. Guillaume. For political service.
- Major Michael Ernie Sykes Hankinson. For political service.
- Professor Peter Stanley Harper, Professor and Head, Department of Medical Genetics, University of Wales College of Medicine and Director, Institute of Medical Genetics for Wales. For services to medicine.
- Peter Arthur Hillard Hartley, lately Chairman, Leeds Urban Development Corporation. For services to urban regeneration.
- Anthony Joseph Hazeldine, lately Grade 5 Department of the Environment.
- Patricia Anne Hodgson (Mrs Donaldson), Director of Policy and Planning, British Broadcasting Corporation. For services to broadcasting.
- Cedric Frank Insley. For political service.
- Peter Jack Jarvis, Chief Executive, Whitbread. For services to the brewing and catering industries.
- Christopher Francis Jebens, OBE, lately Chief Executive, Lautro. For services to the finance industry.
- Jack Jeffery, Chairman and Managing Director, North Surrey Water Ltd. For services to the water industry.
- Jeremy James Jerram, Member, British Railways Board. For services to the railway industry.
- Christopher David Glyn-Jones, Grade 5, Ministry of Defence.
- Elisabeth Audrey, Mrs. Jones, OBE. For political and public service.
- Harry Jones, Chairman, Labour Group, Association of District Councils and Leader, Council of Wales Districts. For services to local government in Wales.
- Sara, Mrs. Jones. For services to ex-service men and women.
- David Lewis. For charitable services.
- Robert Charles William Luff, Founder and Director, Robert Luff Charitable Foundation. For charitable services to medical research.
- Peter James Scott Lumsden, Chairman, Special Trustees, St Thomas' Hospital, London. For services to health care.
- Michael Heathcote Mallinson, Chairman, Department of the Environment's Property Holdings Agency Board. For services to the property industry.
- Terence Francis Mathews, lately Grade 4, Building Societies Commission.
- James McAdam, Chairman, British Apparel and Textile Confederation. For services to the textile and clothing industries.
- Thomas Joseph McCool, Chief Executive, Scottish Vocational Education Council. For services to education.
- John Blyth McDowall, Executive Director, British Steel. For services to the steel industry in Wales.
- Rosemary, Mrs. McKenna, President, Convention of Scottish Local Authorities. For services to local government in Scotland.
- Hector John Finlayson McLean, Appointments Secretary to the Archbishops of Canterbury and York. For services to the Church of England.
- Leif Anthony Mills, General Secretary, Banking, Insurance and Finance Union. For services to industrial relations and to training.
- Kenneth Joseph Minton, Chief Executive and Group Managing Director, Laporte plc. For services to the chemicals industry.
- Robert Michael Nicholls, Director, NHS Executive. For services to health care.
- Patrick O'Brian, Author. For services to literature.
- David Joseph O'Dowd, QPM, Her Majesty's Inspector of Constabulary, Eastern Region. For services to the police.
- Edward O'Neill. For political service.
- Onora Sylvia O'Neill, Principal, Newnham College, University of Cambridge. For services to political philosophy.
- Professor Derek Ogston, Professor of Medicine and Vice Principal, University of Aberdeen. For services to medicine and to education.
- Alan William Parker, Film Director. For services to the film industry.
- Peter Anthony Lawrence Parker, Grade 5, Department of Employment.
- Brian Harold Pearce, Chairman, Pearce Signs Group. For services to industry.
- Martin Roger Perry. For political service.
- Brian William Petley, Grade 5, National Physical Laboratory, Department of Trade and Industry.
- Patrick Robert Prenter, Chairman and Managing Director, MacTaggart Scott and Company Ltd. For services to the defence industry.
- Iain Alasdair Robertson, Chief Executive, Highlands and Islands Enterprise. For services to the Highlands and Islands.
- Alan Walter Rudge, OBE, Deputy Group Managing Director, British Telecommunications. For services to the telecommunications industry.
- John Henry Russell, Chairman, Japan Trade Advisers. For services to export.
- Jonathan Scott, Chairman, Reviewing Committee on the Export of Works of Art and Trustee, Imperial War Museum. For services to art and to museums.
- John Francis Sharpe, Grade 5, Department of Health.
- David John Shattock, QPM, Chief Constable, Avon and Somerset Constabulary. For services to the police.
- Martin Stephen Shelton, lately Corporation Secretary, British Coal Corporation. For services to the coal industry.
- Bernard David Short, Grade 4, Department for Education.
- Richard John Simmons. For political and public service.
- Peter William Smallridge, Director of Social Services, Kent County Council. For services to social work.
- Alan Smith, MBE, Chairman, National Advisory Council on Employment of People with Disabilities. For services to the employment of disabled people.
- George Kenneth Smith. For services to rugby union football.
- Ronald Dennis Neale Somerville, Chairman of Governors, the City Technology College, Kingshurst, Solihull. For services to education.
- Robert Edward Spencer, Grade 5, Ministry of Defence.
- John Maurice Stoddart, Principal and Vice Chancellor, Sheffield Hallam University. For services to higher education.
- Charles Murray Stuart, lately Deputy Chairman, Audit Commission. For services to the Audit Commission.
- John Towers, Chief Executive, Rover Group. For services to the motor manufacturing industry.
- Reginald Charles Tyrrell, lately Chairman, National Trust for Scotland. For services to conservation.
- Peter Upton, Director of Operations, Valuation Office Agency, Her Majesty's Board of Inland Revenue.
- Charles John Prendergast Vereker, DL, Leader, Conservative Group, Warwickshire County Council. For services to local government.
- Ernest John Munro Walker, OBE, lately Chairman, Health Education Board for Scotland. For services to health education in Scotland.
- Daniel Blair Wallace, MBE. For services to the police.
- John MacQueen Ward. For services to industry and to public life in Scotland.
- Judith Weir, Composer. For services to music.
- Peter Wetzel, Chairman, Barnsley and Doncaster Training and Enterprise Council. For services to training.
- Professor Alan Williams, Livesey Professor and Head, Department of Fuel and Energy, University of Leeds. For services to the scientific development of fuel chemistry.
- Anne, Mrs. Williams, Chairman, Ministry of Agriculture, Fisheries and Food's North Mercia Regional Panel. For services to agriculture and to the community in Staffordshire.

==== Officer of the Order of the British Empire (OBE) ====
===== Military division =====
- Commander James Kenneth Dobson, Royal Navy.
- Commander Marcus Peter Fitzgerald, Royal Navy.
- Local Lieutenant Colonel Paul Douglas Thomas Irvine, Royal Marines.
- Commander John Kirkpatrick, Royal Navy.
- Commander Blair Crinean Murray, Royal Navy.
- Local Lieutenant Colonel Christopher John Nunn, Royal Marines.
- Commander Nigel William Sweny, Royal Navy.
- Commander John Geoffrey Hugh Tighe, Royal Navy.
- Lieutenant Colonel Michael Edward Bradley (477735), The Green Howards.
- Lieutenant Colonel Martin Geoffrey Coulson, TD (485652), Royal Monmouthshire Engineers, Territorial Army.
- Lieutenant Colonel Peter John Tyler Maggs (493747), The Royal Logistic Corps.
- Lieutenant Colonel Timothy Francis Leonard Weeks (493568), The Light Infantry.
- Lieutenant Colonel (now Acting Colonel) Aldwin James Glendinning Wight, MBE MC (501023), Welsh Guards.
- Lieutenant Colonel John David Woolmore, BEM (514358), Intelligence Corps.
- Wing Commander Timothy Paul Brewer (5201367), Royal Air Force.
- Wing Commander Jeffrey Donald Bullen (4233114), Royal Air Force.
- Wing Commander Peter Anthony Coker (8026750), Royal Air Force.
- Wing Commander Bernard Cecil Cole (0594665), Royal Air Force.
- Wing Commander Alexander Dickson, MBE AE (3143089), Royal Air Force Volunteer Reserve.
- Wing Commander John Kevin Harte (1941975), Royal Air Force.
- Wing Commander Thomas Paul McDonald (0208581), Royal Air Force.
- Wing Commander Bruce Martin Wynn (5201237), Royal Air Force.

===== Civil division =====
- David Harry Adams, Chief Executive, Railways Pension Trustee Company Ltd. For services to the railway industry.
- Ian Allan. For services to railway preservation, publishing and to Bridewell Royal Hospital-King Edward's School, Witley.
- John Alexander Allen. For services to the Housing Association Movement.
- Joan, Mrs. Allison. For services to athletics.
- William John Arnold, Principal Professional and Technology Officer, Ministry of Defence.
- Wilfred Lionel Gwyn Ashton, lately divisional veterinary Officer, Ministry of Agriculture, Fisheries and Food.
- Margaret Anne, Mrs. Ashwell, Member, Food Advisory Committee. For services to food policy.
- John Brian Ashworth, Vice Chairman, Seagram Distillers and Chairman, Renfrewshire Enterprise. For services to the Scotch whisky industry and to business.
- Rodney Aspinwall, Chairman, Aspinwall and Company Ltd. For services to environmental management.
- Mary Eleanor, Mrs. Asprey. For services to the National Missing Persons' Helpline.
- Pamela, Mrs. Bader, Member, Thames Valley Enterprise Training and Enterprise Council. For services to training.
- Melvyn Barker, Grade 7, Department for Education.
- Rosemary Vera, Mrs. Barkes. For political and public service.
- Andrew Smith Barr, Assistant Collector, Her Majesty's Board of Customs and Excise.
- Susan, Mrs. Battle, Deputy Chief Executive, Birmingham Chamber of Commerce and Industry. For services to the Chamber of Commerce Movement.
- John Stuart Bevan, Secretary, Association for Colleges. For services to education.
- Alexander Wilson Blane, Principal Professional and Technology Officer, Ministry of Defence.
- John Stuart Bloor, Managing Director, Triumph Motorcycles. For services to the motorcycle industry.
- Elizabeth Ann, Mrs. Boatman. For services to women's golf.
- Hazel Elizabeth, Mrs. Bradford. For political and public service.
- James Braid, Member, Fife Regional Council. For services to local government.
- Miss Elspeth Livingston Brewis. For services to health care for children.
- Robert Arthur Brice, DL. For services to the community in Essex.
- Douglas William Imrie-Brown. For charitable services, particularly to Rotary International.
- Professor George William Brown, Professor, Department of Social Policy and Social Staff, Royal Holloway and Bedford New College, London. For services to medical research.
- Richard Henry Bryant, TD. For services to the community in East Sussex.
- Michael Haldon Burden, Technical Director, TI Reynolds Rings Ltd. For services to scientific engineering.
- Alan Burgess, Grade 7, Highways Agency, Department of Transport.
- Elizabeth Kerr, Mrs. Burns, Director, Volunteer Development Scotland. For services to volunteering.
- Jennifer Margaret, Mrs. Butcher, Assistant Collector, Her Majesty's Board of Customs and Excise.
- Miss Mary Rose Winifred Caden, Convener, General Teaching Council for Scotland. For services to education.
- David Howard Cairns, lately Secretary General, International Accounting Standards Committee. For services to the accountancy profession.
- James Campbell Cairns, DFC, Secretary, Soldiers', Sailors' and Airmen's Families Association, Solihull. For services to ex-service men and women.
- Samuel John Chambers. For services to Relate.
- Robert John Haylock Chambers, Fellow, Institute of Development Studies, University of Sussex. For services to developing countries.
- Frederick John Chapman, lately Chairman, Planning Committee, Birmingham City Council. For services to local government.
- Robert William Chappell. For services to optometry.
- Professor Juliet Cheetham, Director, Social Work Research Centre, University of Stirling. For services to social work.
- David Richard Cleaton. For services to careers education.
- Robert Maxwell Clerk, lately Chairman of Council, Association of Scottish District Salmon Fishery Boards. For services to the fisheries industry.
- John Walford Common. For services to the shipping industry, and for charitable services in Northumberland.
- Lindsay Conway. For services to social work.
- John Corns. For political and public service.
- Oliver Grant Crichton. For services to the Hotel and Catering Benevolent Association.
- Professor David Crystal. For services to the English language and to linguistics.
- Michael J. Davey, Regional Secretary, Transport and General Workers Union. For services to industrial relations.
- Allen Robert Leonard Davies, lately Secretary, Civil Litigation Committee, the Law Society. For services to the legal profession.
- David Kenneth Lewis Davies, Chairman, Cancer Research in Wales. For charitable services to the community in Wales.
- Arthur Charles Henry Denny. For services to De Montfort University, Leicester.
- David Henry Duff, Grade 6, Department of Employment.
- Miss Carol Ann Duffy, Poet. For services to poetry.
- Michael Nicholas Duffy, Head Teacher, King Edward VI School, Morpeth, Northumberland. For services to education.
- Dennis Dunn, Port Manager, Associated British Ports, Grimsby and Immingham. For services to the port industry.
- Stephen George Dunster, Treasurer, West Glamorgan County Council. For services to local government in Wales.
- Barbara Carol, Mrs. Eastland. For political and public service.
- Miss Joan Edmondson, lately Grade 7, Employment Service, Department of Employment.
- Robert Anthony Cowan Edridge, Marketing Director, Combat Systems Division, BAeSEMA Ltd. For services to the defence industry.
- Clarice Estelle Norton, Mrs. Edwards. For political and public service.
- John Norman Ellis, lately Secretary, Council of Civil Service Unions. For services to industrial relations.
- Ralph Emery, Vice-President, Canning House. For services to Anglo–Latin American relations.
- David Acfield Emms. For services to education.
- Richard Kendall Corris Evans, Grade 7, Her Majesty's Treasury.
- T. Alun Valentine Evans. For services to the community including Welsh language and culture in Powys.
- Angus Dune Miller Farquharson, DL. For services to forestry and to the community in Aberdeenshire.
- Sister Pauline Fenton. For services to the community, particularly St Michael and Martin's Primary School, in Hounslow, Middlesex.
- Miss Jill Ferguson, Principal, Woking College, Surrey. For services to education.
- John Ferguson, Secretary and Registrar, Royal Pharmaceutical Society of Great Britain. For services to pharmacy.
- Douglas Martin Edward Ferreira, General Manager, Ravenglass and Eskdale Railway. For services to tourism.
- Mary Elizabeth, Mrs. Ferris. For services to education.
- Donald Gordon Fleet, Regional Director, Opportunities for People with Disabilities. For services to disabled people.
- Mavis Alice, Mrs. Foden, Chairman, Walsall Hospitals NHS Trust, West Midlands. For services to health care.
- Anne Margaret Madaline, Mrs. Footner, Chief Nurse Adviser, Frenchay Healthcare NHS Trust, Bristol. For services to health care.
- Harold Bentley Formstone, Grade 7, Department of Trade and Industry.
- Robert Jack Forrest, Farmer. For services to agriculture in Berwickshire.
- Colin Edward Francis, Grade 7, Welsh Office.
- James Albert Fuke. For political service.
- Hance Fullerton, Chief Executive, Grampian Enterprise Ltd. For services to business in Grampian.
- Neil Richard Galbraith, Director of Education and Leisure Services, Western Isles Islands Council and Chairman, Scottish Consultative Council on the Curriculum. For services to education.
- James D. Stiring Gallagher. For services to the catering industry.
- Professor David Ganderton, Chairman, British Pharmacopoeia Commission. For services to the control of medicines.
- Professor David Gardner, Deputy Managing Director and Director of European Projects, Military Aircraft Division, British Aerospace Defence Company. For services to the defence industry.
- Francis Gilhooly, Parliamentary Complaints and Correspondence Manager, Her Majesty's Board of Inland Revenue.
- Brian John Gillespie, TD DL. For services to the community in Tyne and Wear.
- Brian Geoffrey Gleed, Principal Engineer, Project Manager for Safety Assessment of Naval Base Developments, United Kingdom Atomic Energy Authority. For services to the defence industry.
- Michael John Gooch, Grade 7, Department of Trade and Industry.
- John Barrie Gordon, Chairman, North East River Purification Board. For services to the community in Banff and Buchan, Aberdeenshire.
- John Gott, Chief Commandant, Lancashire Special Constabulary. For services to the police.
- Lance Grainger, Grade 6, Department of Transport.
- Dorothy Mary, Mrs. Greenland, MBE. For political and public services.
- Richard Moran Greensmith, General Manager, Special Network Services, British Telecommunications. For services to the telecommunications industry.
- Judith, Mrs. Greenwood, Consultant Community Psychiatrist, Edinburgh Healthcare NHS Trust. For services to medicine.
- Alfred Arthur Grimwade. For services to the Cedarmore Housing Association, Kent.
- Miss Maggi Hambling, Artist. For services to art.
- Miss Susan Hampshire (Lady Kulukundis), President, Dyslexia Institute. For services to dyslexic people.
- Penelope Jane, Mrs. Meredith-Hardy, Member, Hertfordshire Probation Committee. For services to the Probation Service.
- Professor David William Harkness. For services to museums.
- Norman Alexander Harkness, Grade 6, the Trade Mark Registry, the Patent Office, Department of Trade and Industry.
- Anthony John Hart, DSC. For services to Magistracy in the City of London.
- Nasimulhaq Shahzad Hasnie, Co-ordinator for Equal Opportunities Multi-Cultural Education, Huddersfield Technical College. For services to education and to community relations.
- John Harold Haynes, Chairman, Haynes Publishing Group. For services to publishing.
- Joyce Helena, Mrs. Hayward, President, the Attingham Trust. For services to the study of the British country house.
- Brian Tate Head, Principal Inspector, Her Majesty's Inspectorate of Pollution, Department of the Environment.
- Colin Douglas Henderson, lately Grade 6, Scottish Office.
- Louise Ann, Mrs. Henry (Mrs. Maderson), Grade 7, Department of Health.
- Roderic Morley Hewitt. For services to forestry.
- Thomas Albert Hilliard. For charitable services in Surrey.
- John Michael Hillier, Director of Administration, West Midlands Police. For services to the police.
- Anthony John Hirst, Director, the Boat Museum and lately Chairman, Association of Independent Museums. For services to museums.
- Lieutenant Colonel Raymond Reginald Holland, MBE BEM. For services to disabled ex-service men and women.
- Derek Peter Holley. For political and public service.
- Miss Doreen Mary Horridge, lately Grade 6, Department of Health.
- David Morgan Hughes, Chief Conservator (Wales), Forestry Commission.
- Mohammed Hamid Husain, General Medical Practitioner, Rotherham, South Yorkshire. For services to medicine.
- Eileen Isobel Mary, Mrs. Hutton, lately President National Childbirth Trust. For services to health care in the maternity services.
- Kazuo Ishiguro, Writer. For services to literature.
- Norma Jean, Mrs. Izard. For services to women's cricket.
- Christopher Robert Jackson, Member, Wales Tourist Board. For services to tourism in Wales.
- Malcolm Stuart Jackson, lately Grade 6, Department of Social Security.
- Ivan Jacobson, Consultant Neurosurgeon, Dundee Royal Infirmary. For services to medicine.
- Saeed Jaffrey, Actor. For services to drama.
- Roy Arthur Jeffreys, Honorary Treasurer, the Royal Society of Chemistry. For services to science.
- Kevin John Jenkins, Co-founder and Children and Youth Team Manager, Community Links. For services to young people.
- William Anthony Jerrett. For services to medicine in Wales.
- Michael John Jewitt, District Inspector, Her Majesty's Board of Inland Revenue.
- Gareth Jones. For services to the community, particularly disabled people, in Wales.
- Jackie, Mrs. Jenkin-Jones. For political and public service.
- Janet Eveline, Mrs. Jones. For services to education and to women's issues.
- John Lloyd Jones, Chairman, National Farmers' Union Welsh Council. For services to agriculture in Wales.
- Margaret Catherine, Mrs. Jones, lately Headteacher, Ysgol Pendalar, Caeraarfon, Gwynedd. For services to education.
- Sydney Jones, Chief Executive, the Boys' Brigade. For services to young people.
- David Graham Keenleside. For services to the University of Manchester Institute of Science and Technology.
- Michael John Kendrick, Director of Planning and Transportation, Northamptonshire County Council. For services to road safety.
- Arthur Henry William Kennard, ISO, President, National Committee of Valuation Tribunals and President, Buckinghamshire Valuation Tribunal. For services to Valuation Tribunals.
- Joanna Alicia Gore, Mrs. Kennedy, Associate Director, Ove Arup and Partners. For services to women in engineering.
- John Patrick Kennedy. For legal services to the Band Aid Trust.
- Denis Patrick Gerard Keogh, Deputy Director, Northern Ireland Works Organisation.
- Abdul Qadeer Khan, Head, South Yorkshire Waste Regulation Unit. For services to environmental protection.
- Mohammed Akram Khan, Grade 6, Office for Standards in Education.
- Ronnie King, QFSM, Chief Fire Officer, Dyfed County Fire Brigade. For services to the fire service.
- John Kingdom, Grade 6, Department of the Environment.
- Rosemary Davina, Lady. Kingsdown, lately President, British Red Cross Society, Kent. For services to the British Red Cross Society.
- John Neville Knox, Chairman, the Lawyers' Christian Fellowship. For services to the legal profession.
- Frank Philip Krinks, General Secretary, Civil Service Sports Council.
- John Colin Leonard Thornton Lee, Area Chairman, Sea Cadet Corps, North West England. For services to young people.
- Neville Hall Lee, President, Association of Residential Letting Agents. For services to the letting industry.
- Margaret Clare, Mrs. Lillyman, Headteacher, Millais School, Horsham, West Sussex. For services to education.
- James Malcolm Littlewood, Consultant in Paediatrics, St. James's University Hospital, Leeds. For services to medicine.
- Alexander John Bruce-Lockhart. For political and public service.
- Andrew Usherwood Lyburn, Member, Occupational Pensions Board. For services to occupational pensions.
- Professor George Murray Mackay, Professor in Transport Safety, University of Birmingham. For services to road and vehicle safety.
- Miss Ruth Mackenzie, Executive Director, Nottingham Playhouse. For services to the theatre.
- Jurat Herbert Nicolle Machon. For services to the community in Guernsey.
- Sheila Stirling, Mrs. Mackay. For political and public service.
- Bruce David Mackie. For political and public service.
- Audrey, Mrs. Males, Chief Administrative Nursing Officer, Mid-Glamorgan Health Authority. For services to nursing.
- John Henry Martin. For services to the construction industry.
- Samuel Robert Martin. For services to agriculture.
- Anthony Phillip Mathers, Director, Armoured Fighting Vehicle Projects, GKN Defence. For services to the defence industry.
- Edward Matthews, lately Director, Edinburgh Voluntary Organisations' Council and Scottish Refugee Council. For services to voluntary organisations.
- Edward Robert Maun, Principal Scientific Officer, Ministry of Defence.
- John Hunter Maxwell. For services to the newspaper industry and to the community in Cumbria.
- Ian Malcolm McAlpine. For political and public service.
- John McFarlane, Executive Director, Standard Chartered. For services to the finance industry.
- Professor John Peter McInerney, Glanely Professor of Agricultural Policy, University of Exeter. For services to agricultural economics.
- James McInnes. For services to the community, particularly the Abbeyfield Society, in Kendal, Cumbria.
- Miss Sheila Marshall McKechnie. For services to homeless people.
- Robert James McKinstry. For services to architecture.
- William Pollock McLaren, MBE. For services to broadcasting and to rugby union football.
- Michael Frederick Messenger, County Librarian and Arts Officer, Hereford and Worcester County Council. For services to libraries.
- William John Millar, lately Grade 7, Northern Ireland Office.
- Professor Spencer Leonard Millham, Director, Dartington Social Research Unit. For services to young people.
- George Mutch Mitchell, Seneschal, the Priory for Wales, Order of St John. For services to the Order of St John.
- John Cheason Mitchell, Chairman, Working Group on Food and Agriculture for Central and Eastern Europe and the former Soviet Union. For services to export.
- Brian Patrick Monaghan, District Inspector, Her Majesty's Board of Inland Revenue.
- John Clive Monks, Chairman, Dental Rates Study Group. For services to the dental profession.
- Miss Joyce Moore, Headteacher, Oswaldtwistle Rhyddings County High School, Lancashire. For services to education.
- Patrick John Moran, Grade 7, Treasury Solicitor's Department.
- Gillian Ann, Mrs. Morbey, Director, SENSE Scotland. For services to deaf and blind people.
- John Anthony Paterson-Morgan, lately Chairman, Advisory Committee for General Commissioner, Acton and Kensington. For services to the General Commissioners for Income Tax.
- Jonathan Moynihan, Group Chief Executive, PA Consulting. For services to business.
- Alexander MacLeod Murray, Director, Department of Medical Physics and Bio-Engineering, Raigmore NHS Trust, Inverness. For services to science.
- Neil Warren Murray. For services to the community in Whitley Bay, Tyne and Wear.
- James Wilson McDowell Neil, Principal, Dumfries and Galloway College. For services to education.
- Janet Blanche, Mrs. Newman. For services to the National Missing Persons' Helpline.
- Maureen Edith, Mrs. Nicol. For services to women's issues.
- James Charles Barton Nock. For political and public service.
- Alan Norbury, Grade 6, Home Office.
- Geoffrey Norman, lately Deputy Secretary of Commissions (Training), Lord Chancellor's Department.
- Miss Erica May Norton, Assistant Chief Constable, Leicestershire Constabulary. For services to the police.
- Jerome O'Hea, Chairman, Colt Group Ltd. For services to business and to training and research.
- Arthur Vernon Oscroft, lately Director of Housing, Nottingham City Council. For services to housing.
- Ivor Albert Sydney Owen, lately Parliamentary Correspondent, Financial Times. For services to journalism.
- Wing Commander Alan Geoffrey Page, Royal Air Force (Retired), DSO DFC, Founder, Battle of Britain Memorial Trust.
- Miss Elaine Paige, Singer and actress. For services to the musical theatre.
- Timothy Vernon Francis Pape, Director General, the Shaw Trust. For services to disabled people.
- Brian John Perry, lately Director, British Library Research and Development Department.
- Miss Cheryl Alane Plumridge, Grade 7, Ministry of Defence.
- Robert Comer Pounder, Vice President, Submarine Old Comrades Association, Merseyside. For services to ex-service men and women.
- John William Pratt. For services to Portland College, Nottinghamshire.
- Eric John Radley. For political and public service.
- Miss Jennifer Christine Ranson, Grade 7, Foreign and Commonwealth Office.
- Major Ian William Reynolds, TD. For political service.
- Geoffrey Vincent Roberts. For services to blind people in the Forest of Dean.
- Phyllida Katharine, Mrs. Stewart-Roberts, DL. For services to the community, particularly the St. John Ambulance, in East Sussex.
- David Neil Robinson, Co-founder and Director, Community Links. For services to the community.
- June Rosamond Maxwell, Mrs. Robinson. For political and public service.
- Joan Elizabeth, Mrs. Ruddock. For services to industry.
- Duncan Rutter, TD, lately Chief Executive, Hotel and Catering Training Company Ltd. For services to tourism.
- Anthony John Sainsbury. For services to sport for disabled people.
- Philip Salisbury, Managing Director, Peter Brotherhood Ltd. For services to business in Cambridgeshire.
- Arthur Saunders, International Manager, Association of British Insurers. For services to the insurance industry.
- William Scott, Managing Director and Chief Executive, Ferguson Shipbuilders. For services to the shipbuilding and engineering industries.
- Michael John Sexton, Grade 7, Overseas Development Administration.
- Graham John Seymour, Senior Principal Valuer, Her Majesty's Board of Inland Revenue.
- John Malcolm Shaw, lately Her Majesty's Senior Inspector of Mechanical Engineering in Mines, Health and Safety Executive, Department of Employment.
- Elizabeth Ann, Mrs. Sherriff. For political service.
- Miss Patricia Louise Shove, Principal Scientific Officer, Ministry of Defence.
- Ruth, Mrs. Sims, Chief Executive, Mildmay Hospital, Hackney, London. For services to health care.
- Jolyon Edward Sloggett, Secretary, Institute of Marine Engineers. For services to marine engineering.
- Miss Isobel Smail, lately Member, Castle Morpeth Borough Council, Northumberland. For services to local government.
- Miss Sheila Drew Smith. For services to the Ordnance Survey.
- Douglas Dempsey Smyth. For services to health care.
- Colin Snowden, The City Engineer, City of London. For services to the City of London.
- Malcolm John Hamilton Paul Southgate, Deputy Managing Director, European Passenger Services. For services to the railway industry.
- The Reverend David Staple, General Secretary, Free Church Federal Council. For services to ecumenical relations.
- Professor Richard Steinitz, Founder and Artistic Director, Huddersfield Contemporary Music Festival. For services to music.
- Robert Alexander Stewart, lately Headteacher, Bishopbriggs High School, Strathclyde. For services to education.
- John Barry Stiff, QFSM, lately Firemaster, Dumfries and Galloway Fire Brigade. For services to the fire service.
- Alastair James Struthers, lately Chairman, Caledonian MacBrayne. For services to shipping and to transport in western Scotland.
- Harry Swain. For services to the Magistracy in Leeds.
- Robert Charles Swan. For services to polar exploration.
- Professor Martin Nicholas Sweeting, Managing Director and Chief Executive, Surrey Satellite Technology. For services to space satellite technology.
- Robert Nicol Traquair Thin, Consultant Physician, Genito-Urinary Medicine, St. Thomas' Hospital, London. For services to medicine.
- Hugh Miles Thomas, Senior Partner, Price Waterhouse, Wales. For services to business in Wales.
- Michael Stanley Thornton, lately Chairman, Groundwork Amber Valley, Derbyshire. For services to the environment.
- Stanley Todd, President and Chief Executive, Rolls-Royce Industries Canada Inc. For services to the aero engine industry.
- Ronald Arthur Travers. For services to the Leonard Cheshire Foundation and to the Ryder-Cheshire Foundation.
- Alan John Tuckett, Director, National Institute of Adult Continuing Education. For services to adult further education.
- Professor Walter Jack Tulley, Chairman, East Surrey Dial-a-Ride. For services to the mobility of disabled people.
- Trevor John Tupper, Senior Financial Policy Adviser, Her Majesty's Board of Inland Revenue.
- Peter Turner, Grade 7, Department of Social Security Benefits Agency.
- Harold Nelson Twells, Chairman, Export Clubs' Advisory Committee. For services to export.
- Betty Mrs. Underhill, Chairman, Disabled Men's Industries, Royal British Legion. For services to the Royal British Legion.
- Arthur George Varney, Professional and Technology Superintending Grade, Ministry of Defence.
- James Harcourt Vernon. For political and public service.
- Catherine Mary, The Honourable Mrs. Villiers, Vice President, British Red Cross Society, London. For services to the British Red Cross Society.
- Geoffrey Michael Montgomery Wakeford. For services to the Worshipful Company of Mercers.
- Hugh Noel Walker, Grade 7, Department of Health and Social Security.
- John Williamson Wallace, Trumpeter. For services to music.
- John Dunbar Walsh, Head, Particle Physics Division, Particle Physics and Astronomy Research Council. For services to science.
- Victor Robin Ware, Credit Director, GE Capital Retailer Financial Services Ltd. For services to the credit industry.
- David Pirie Webster, Chairman, Commonwealth Games Council for Scotland. For services to sport.
- Brian Whalley, Principal Lecturer, Civil Service College, Office of Public Service and Science.
- John Roy Wilcock, District Inspector, Her Majesty's Board of Inland Revenue.
- Harold James Arthur Wilson, lately Director of News and Regional Development, Anglia Television. For services to broadcasting.
- Leslie James Wilson, Managing Director, Bristol Airport. For services to the aviation industry.
- Norman Wisdom, Actor and Comedian. For services to entertainment and for charitable services.
- Anthony Paul Woodhouse, TD, Grade 7, Ministry of Agriculture, Fisheries and Food.
- Frank Albert Antony Wootton. For services to the Royal Air Force.
- Edward Addison Wrangham. For services to flood defence and the environment in North East England.
- David Alfred Wright. For services to the Magistracy in Huddersfield.
- David Stephen Wright, Chief Medical Officer, British Petroleum Company. For services to occupational health.
- Joan Kathleen, Mrs. Wykes, Chairman, Thames Regional Rivers Advisory Committee, National Rivers Authority. For services to the National Rivers Authority.
- Robert William Jameson Young, Her Majesty's Staff Inspector of Schools, Scottish Office.

===== Diplomatic and Overseas List =====
- Joseph Henri Jerome Adam, President, British Chamber of Commerce, Brussels.
- Peter John Arthern Head, English Translation Service, European Council Secretariat, Brussels.
- Duncan John Blake. For services to British commercial and community interests in Turkey.
- Dr. Christopher Stephen Bourne. For services to medicine, Turks and Caicos Islands.
- James Ernest Buckle, Deputy Commissioner, Independent Commission Against Corruption, Hong Kong.
- Michael David Cartland, IP., Secretary, Financial Services, Hong Kong.
- Professor Chan Kai-ming, Chairman, Department of Orthopaedics and Traumatology, Chinese University of Hong Kong.
- Professor Cheung Yau Kai, Pro-Vice Chancellor, Hong Kong University.
- Pauline, Lady Cheung Cheng Po-lin J.P. Director, Legal Aid, Hong Kong.
- Dr. David John Cooke, Education Attache, H.M. Embassy, Washington.
- William Lawson Cordiner, lately High Commissioner, Nuku'alofa.
- Dr. Ian Court, Honorary Consul, Puerto Rico.
- David Hugh Crowther, Commissioner of Police, Montserrat.
- Professor Terence Newman Davis, Pro-Vice Chancellor, University of Namibia.
- Dr. Anthony John Davison, Head, Andhra Pradesh Primary Education Project (APPEP).
- Anthony Philip Duckett, Q.C., Acting Solicitor General, Hong Kong.
- Dr. George Ewart, Chairman and Managing Director, ICI India Ltd.
- Dr. Jeremy Peter Eyres, Director, British Council, Zimbabwe.
- Dr. Derek Harvey, Medical Director, Joint Oil Companies Clinic, Sana'a.
- Alan Henderson. For services to education in Oman.
- Pamela Felicity Irene, Mrs. Hickley, M.B.E. For services to the Cheshire Home, Singapore.
- George Grant Hill. For services to British commercial interests in Turkey.
- Nicolas Carrington Grose-Hodge. For services to British commercial interests in Argentina.
- Albert Applebaum Richardson Lake, M.B.E. For services to the community in Anguilla.
- Stuart Hamilton Leckie, J.P. For public and community services in Hong Kong.
- Antony Leung Kam Chung, For services to British commercial interests, Hong Kong.
- David Ian Martin, lately Chairman, British Hospital Committee, Buenos Aires.
- John Ian Stuart McLean, lately First Secretary (Works), H.M. Embassy, Paris.
- Alan John Mountford, lately British Council, Turkey.
- Louis John Nell. For services to documentary film in Central Africa.
- Michael Morgan Phillips. For services to British commercial interests in Taiwan.
- David Ivan Price. For services to British commercial interests in Australia.
- Peter Yen Shou Pun. For services to British commercial interests in Hong Kong.
- Charles Reynolds. For welfare and community services in India.
- Iain Strachan Sangster. For services to British commercial interests in Bangladesh.
- Miss Anita Morag Moir Sheldon, lately H.M. Consul, Cairo.
- Stuart Stanger Strong, lately First Secretary (Commercial), British High Commission Accra.
- Tseng Cheng, M.B.E., J.P. For welfare services to the community in Hong Kong.
- Aidan St. Paul Walsh. For services to British commercial interests in the United States.
- Dr. David Michael Ward, Warden, St. John's Ophthalmic Hospital, Jerusalem.

== Cook Islands ==
=== British Empire Medal (BEM) ===
- Mariri Paratainga. For services to the community.
- The Honourable Raututi Taringa. For services to the community.

== Barbados ==
=== Knight Commander of the Order of St Michael and St George (KCMG) ===
- Everton DeCourcey Weekes, GCM OBE. For services to cricket and for public service.

== Grenada ==
=== Knight Bachelor ===
- The Right Honourable Nicholas Alexander Brathwaite, OBE MP. For public service.

=== The Most Excellent Order of the British Empire ===
==== Officer of the Order of the British Empire (OBE) ====
- Orgias Campbell. For services to the development of agriculture.

==== Member of the Order of the British Empire (MBE) ====
- Miss Elsia Ferguson. For services to the development of youth and sport.
- Cecil Kendrick Ralph Sylvester. For services to the development of sports.

== Papua New Guinea ==
=== Knight Bachelor ===
- Kenneth Bruce Trezise, OBE. For services to business development.

=== Companion of the Order of St Michael and St George (CMG) ===
- The Honourable Alois Koki, MP. For services to politics and the community.

=== The Most Excellent Order of the British Empire ===
==== Dame Commander of the Order of the British Empire (DBE) ====
- Dr. Rosalina Violet Kekedo, OBE. For services to commerce and sports.

==== Knight Commander of the Order of the British Empire (KBE) ====
- Bishop Getake Gam (Evangelical Lutheran Church). For services to the community.

==== Commander of the Order of the British Empire (CBE) ====
- The Honourable Mr. Justice Timothy Hinchcliffe. For services to justice and the community.

==== Officer of the Order of the British Empire (OBE) ====
- Ulivian Ameneng. For services to the community.
- Edward Michael Godden. For services to the Papua New Guinea Electricity Commission.
- Daniel Lingnoge. For community services.
- John Andrew Painap. For public service.
- Noel Sneleksz. For services to the development of maritime training.

==== Member of the Order of the British Empire (MBE) ====
- Chief Inspector Patrick Kotop. For service to correctional services.
- Christopher Owen McKee. For services to science, technology and the community.
- Miss Kathleen Sakias. For services to journalism.
- Major John Duncan Thurgar. For services to the disabled and the community.
- Inspector Henry Wavik. For service to correctional services.
- Inspector Miriam Yawa. For services to the Royal Papua New Guinea Constabulary, especially in the areas of welfare and women's affairs.

=== Imperial Service Order (ISO) ===
- John Takapan. For services to the Royal Papua New Guinea Constabulary.

=== British Empire Medal (BEM) ===
- First Constable Leo Aitsi. For services to the Royal Papua New Guinea Constabulary.
- Miss Konio Cory Boe Arua. For political services.
- Frank Bob. For services to the Department of Works and State.
- Sergeant Major Peter Inabari. For services to correctional services.
- Wapilie Komjil. For services to the Papua New Guinea Government and the community.
- Maraiapo Mahare. For services to the community and local government council.
- Joshua Pokanas Muan. For services to scouting, health and the community.
- Kiap Nani. For services to the people of Western Highlands province.
- Sergeant Joe Bal Wagai. For services to the community and the Royal Papua New Guinea Constabulary.
- Senior Constable Daniel Yopu. For services to the Royal Papua New Guinea Constabulary.

=== Queen's Police Medal (QPM) ===
- Chief Superintendent Barry Roy Henson. For services to the Royal Papua New Guinea Constabulary and to charity.
- Superintendent Giossi Labi. For services to the Royal Papua New Guinea Constabulary.

== Solomon Islands ==
=== The Most Excellent Order of the British Empire ===
==== Officer of the Order of the British Empire (OBE) ====
- Chief Inspector Christopher Lawson Fora. For devotion to duty.

==== Member of the Order of the British Empire (MBE) ====
- Police Constable Joses Fuel. For devotion to duty.
- Station Sergeant Mitchell Arthur Rakau. For devotion to duty.
- Station Sergeant Godwin Tesimu. For devotion to duty.

== Saint Lucia ==
=== Companion of the Order of St Michael and St George (CMG) ===
- Parry Jones Husbands, QC. For public and community service.

=== The Most Excellent Order of the British Empire ===
==== Officer of the Order of the British Empire (OBE) ====
- Francis St. Juste Leonce. For public services in the field of agriculture.
- Bernard Cecil Theobalds. For public service in the field of electrification.

==== Member of the Order of the British Empire (MBE) ====
- Dr. Nicholas Octave Frederick. For public service in the field of education.
- Gregory Glace. For public service in the field of tourism.
- Miss Lawrence Martha Priscillia Laurent. For public service in the field of education.

== Belize ==
=== The Most Excellent Order of the British Empire ===
==== Officer of the Order of the British Empire (OBE) ====
- Seymour Vernon. For services to the community.

==== Member of the Order of the British Empire (MBE) ====
- Elijio Panti. For services to the country.

== Antigua and Barbuda ==
=== Companion of the Order of St Michael and St George (CMG) ===
- Dr. Hayden Thomas. For public service.

=== Member of the Order of the British Empire (MBE) ===
- Miss Isalyn Casilla Richards. For public service.

== Saint Christopher and Nevis ==
=== Member of the Order of the British Empire (MBE) ===
- Gloria Lelita, Mrs. Anslyn. For services to the community.
