= Wyggeston Grammar School =

Wyggeston Grammar School can refer to two schools in Leicester, England:

- Wyggeston Grammar School for Boys, closed in 1978 to be replaced by Wyggeston and Queen Elizabeth I College
- Wyggeston Grammar School for Girls, later Wyggeston Collegiate Sixth Form College and now Regent College, Leicester
