= Denham Aerodrome =

Airport in Buckinghamshire, England

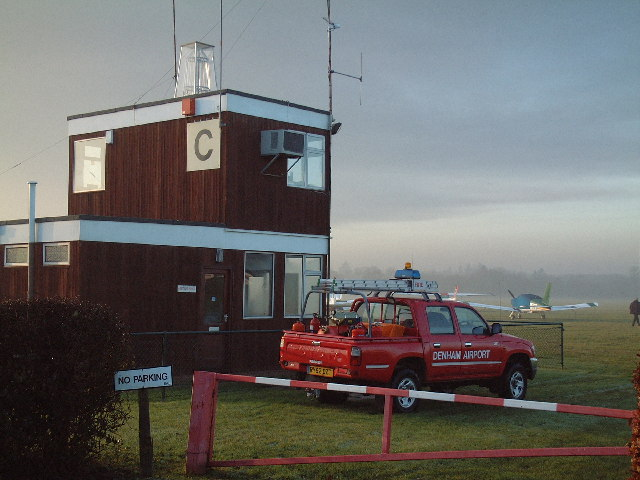
- Denham Aerodrome Control Tower
- IATA: none; ICAO: EGLD

Summary
- Airport type: Public
- Operator: Bickerton's Aerodromes Ltd
- Location: Gerrards Cross, Buckinghamshire, England
- Elevation AMSL: 249 ft / 76 m
- Coordinates: 51°35′18″N 000°30′47″W
- Website: www.egld.com

Map
- Location in Buckinghamshire

Runways
Direction	Length		Surface
Direction	m	ft	Surface
06/24	775	2,543	Asphalt
12/30	546	1,791	Grass
- Sources: UK AIP at NATS.

Denham Aerodrome (ICAO: EGLD) is an operational general aviation aerodrome located 1.5 NM (2.8 km; 1.7 mi) east of Gerrards Cross, near Denham, Buckinghamshire, England. It also serves as an important reliever airport for Heathrow Airport.

Denham Aerodrome has a CAA Ordinary Licence (Number P646) that allows flights for the public transport of passengers or for flying instruction as authorised by the licensee (Bickertons Aerodromes Limited).

Denham lies beneath Heathrow’s Class D airspace. VFR entry/exit points are at Maple Cross (CHT) and St Giles Church. Entry lanes and circuit height are at 1,000 ft (300 m) MSL. It has one paved runway, aligned 06/24, a parallel grass runway and another grass runway aligned 12/30. It also has substantial hangarage.

== History ==
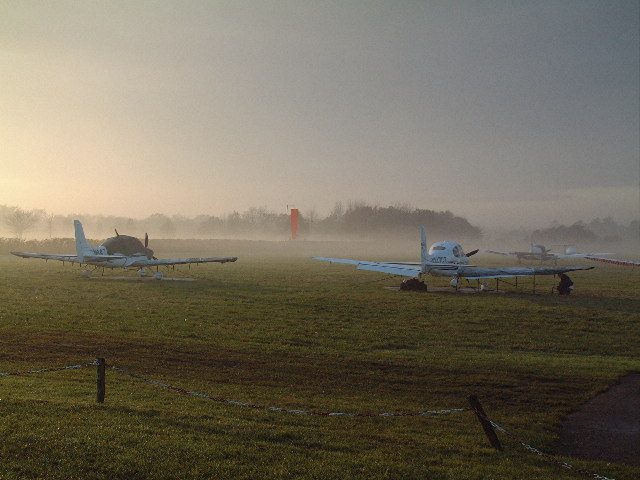
Light aircraft at the aerodrome

There are records that flying has been taking place at Denham Aerodrome since 1915, when during the First World War, RAF Denham was established as a flying training school for Flight Cadets.

The airfield was first licensed as a private use airfield to Squadron Leader J. M. Bickerton by the CAA on 19 May 1938. During the Second World War, the airfield was used again as a training school. The largest based aircraft was a Douglas DC-3 of Gregory Air Services and occasional airshows have been staged here. The airfield was the home to one of the earliest parachuting clubs in the UK, starting in 1955 the "British Parachute Club" was based here until May 1956 when they moved to Blackbushe Airport in Hampshire. The club at Denham was run by instructor Dumbo Willans and is known as the first civilian parachuting school in Britain.

A light aircraft was stolen on Sunday 2 November 1980 in the early morning, and flown to Heathrow after 'buzzing' the M4. Heathrow did not detect the aircraft before it landed. The aircraft was owned by Peter John Hunt. Nicholas John Radford, aged 22, of Chalfont St Peter was charged by police in December 1980, for theft and not communicating a flight plan, to the London Central Zone.

=== Services ===
Presently, there are a number of charter and flight instruction and filming operators based at Denham Aerodrome as well as a helicopter maintenance facility. The Pilot Center flying school, HeliAir, Aerospace Design Facilities, AS Aerospace Ltd, FlyingTV Ltd, Helicopter Film Services. A restaurant near the control tower is named "Biggles", after the fictional airman of that name, there is also a small café called "The Crew Room" on the north side of the airfield.

=== Historical Units ===
- No. 21 Elementary Flying Training School
- No. 125 Gliding School
- No. 652 Squadron

== See also ==
- Airports of London - Wikipedia
