= James Essinger publications =

This is a list of publications by English author James Essinger. For information about the author see main article James Essinger.

== Books and Publications by James Essinger ==
=== Historical ===
- Essinger, James (2004). Jacquard's web : how a hand-loom led to the birth of the information age. Oxford: Oxford Univ. Press. ISBN 9780192805775.
- Essinger, James (2005). Spellbound : the true story of man's greatest invention. London: Robson. ISBN 978-1861059062.
- Essinger, James (2013). A Female Genius: How Ada Lovelace Started the Computer Age. UK: Gibson Square Books Ltd. ISBN 978-1908096661.

=== Management and consultancy ===
- Essinger, James (1999). Writing marketing copy to get results (2nd ed.). London: International Thomson Business. ISBN 978-1861525192.
- Essinger, James (1994). Starting a high-income consultancy. Corby: Institute of Management Foundation. ISBN 978-0273605065.

=== Financial ===
- Essinger, James (1991). Global custody (1st ed.). London: Longman. ISBN 978-0851218212.
- Essinger, James (1992). Electronic payment systems : winning new customers (1st ed.). London: Chapman & Hall. ISBN 978-0412462900.
- Essinger, James (1992). Investment Manager's Handbook (1st ed.). London: Chapman & Hall. ISBN 978-0412472909.
- Essinger, James (1991). Investment management training manual. London: Euromoney Publications. ISBN 978-1855641280.
- Essinger, James (1992). Computer techniques in investment management. London: Macmillan Press. ISBN 978-0333583692.
- Essinger, James (1994). Eastern European banking (1st ed.). London: Chapman & Hall. ISBN 978-0412551604.
- Essinger, James (1996). Virtual financial services. London: FT Financial Publishing. ISBN 978-1853344374.
- Essinger, James (1999). The virtual banking revolution (1 ed., Reprint. ed.). London: Internat. Thomson Business Press. ISBN 978-1861523433.
- Essinger, James (1999). The High-Tech Retail Financial Services Revolution (Reuters business insight). London: Datamonitor PLC. ISBN 1-84296-020-2. OCLC 42795762.

=== Computing and technology ===
- Essinger, James (1990). Artificial intelligence : applications in financial trading and investment management. London: Euromoney Publ. ISBN 978-1855640146.
- Essinger, James (1990). Computer security in financial organisations. Oxford: Elsevier Advanced Technology. ISBN 978-0946395644.
- Essinger, James (1993). Managing technology in financial institutions. London: Pitman Pub. ISBN 978-0273600237.
- Essinger, James (1991). Banking Technology as a Competitive Weapon (Financial Times Management Report). London: Financial Times Business Information. ISBN 978-1853341397.
- Essinger, James (1994). Financial technology: Effective cost management (A Financial times management report). London: Financial Times Business Information. ISBN 978-1853342264.
- Essinger, James (1996). Computer security within financial institutions : controlling the risks. London: FT Financial Publishing. ISBN 978-1853346651.
- Essinger, James (1992). Controlling computer security : a guide for financial institutions. London: Financial Times Business Information. ISBN 978-1853341632.

=== Co-authored publications ===
- Dembitz, Alex; Essinger, James (2000). Breakthrough consulting : so you want to be a consultant? Turn your expertise into a successful consulting business. London: Financial Times Prentice Hall. ISBN 9780273637073.
- Rosen, Joseph; Essinger, James (1989). Advanced computer applications for investment managers. Oxford, UK: Elsevier Advanced Technology. ISBN 978-0946395514.
- Rosen, Joseph; Essinger, James (1993). Global Directory of Financial Information Vendors. US: McGraw-Hill Inc. ISBN 978-1556237881.
- Essinger, James; Wylie, Helen (1999). The seven deadly skills of competing. London: International Thomson Business Press. ISBN 978-1861523747.
- Essinger, James; Gay, Charles L. (2000). Inside Outsourcing: The Insider's Guide to Managing Strategic Sourcing. Nicholas Brealey Publishing. ISBN 978-1857882049.
- Essinger, James; Hicks, Richard (1991). Making computers more human : designing for human-computer interaction. Oxford, UK: Elsevier Advanced Technology. ISBN 978-1856170574.
- Essinger, James; Slater, Ken; Tantam, Mark (1991). Computer security in banking. London: Woodhead-Faulkner. ISBN 978-1855640368.
- Essinger, James (1997). It in Selling Retail Financial Services (A Financial times management report). London: FT Energy, a division of Pearson Professional Limited. ISBN 978-1853342257.
- Essinger, James; Bourne, Terry (1997). Legacy systems : upgrading and enhancing outdated computer systems in financial institutions. London: Pearson Professional. ISBN 978-1853348228.
- Hicks, Richard; Essinger, James (1991). Making computers more human : designing for human-computer interaction. Oxford, UK: Elsevier Advanced Technology. ISBN 9781856170574.

=== Other articles ===
- Essinger, James (30 May 1993). "Revolution starts at the bottom: James Essinger on a different route to market for East European banks". The Independent.
- Essinger, James. "200th years of Petra, Jordan". Business Destinations.
- Essinger, James (19 November 2012). "The myth of chartism". World Finance. Archived from the original on 1 February 2013.
