= Regents College (disambiguation) =

Regents College may refer to:

- Regent's University London, a private university.
- Excelsior College, a private college located in Albany, New York, until 2001 called Regents College.

It should not be confused with

- Regent College, Leicester, a sixth form college located in Leicester, England.
- Regent College, an evangelical Protestant graduate school located in Vancouver, British Columbia, Canada.
