= Wyggeston Grammar School for Boys =

Grammar school in Leicester, England

Wyggeston Grammar School for Boys was a grammar school in Leicester, England, in existence from 1876 to 1976.

It was succeeded by the present-day Wyggeston and Queen Elizabeth I College.

== History ==
After William Wyggeston's death in 1536, his brother Thomas Wyggeston, as a trustee, used part of the money to establish a school for boys known as the Elizabethan Grammar School. This eventually became defunct in the 19th century, but was re-founded on the site of the old Wyggeston Hospital as the Wyggeston Hospital School, which took its first pupils on 30 April 1877. This school passed its name to the later Wyggeston Grammar School for Boys. In 1927, new buildings were built, designed by James Miller.

In 1970/1971, the school won the national Top of the Form radio quiz show, beating Harris Academy, Dundee, in the final on 2 January 1971.

After the reorganisation of local government, the system of education in the City of Leicester became comprehensive, and in 1976, the school ceased to take in new 11 year old boys, but instead took an intake of 6th formers, both boys and girls. Over the next 5 years, the school for 11 to 16 year olds disappeared leaving a sixth form college under the name Wyggeston and Queen Elizabeth I College.

Wyggeston Grammar School for Girls, also known as Wyggeston Girls' Grammar School, was founded not long after the boys' school and also closed in 1976. Its site was re-used for the Wyggeston Collegiate Sixth Form College, known as Regent College, Leicester, between 1996 and 2018, when it was absorbed into Wyggeston and Queen Elizabeth I College.

== Former pupils ==
- Sir Frank Adcock, Professor of Ancient History from 1925 to 1951 at the University of Cambridge, and President from 1947 to 1948 of the Classical Association (1897–1904)
- Sir Richard Armstrong, conductor Scottish Opera 1993–2005 (1954–61)
- Henry Atkins, chess master and school-teacher (1883–1890)
- Sir David Attenborough, broadcaster and naturalist (1937–44)
- Lord Attenborough, actor, director, producer, and entrepreneur
- Sub-Lieutenant John Herbert Babington, bomb disposal expert (1922–29)
- Andrew Bailey, Governor of the Bank of England since 2020 (1970–77)
- William James (Bill) Ballantine, Marine Biologist, New Zealand
- Graham Bell, biologist (1960–67)
- Rev. Canon Dr. Alan Billings, Anglican priest, teacher, academic, politician and South Yorkshire Police and Crime Commissioner 2014–present (1954–61)
- David Campton, dramatist (1935–42)
- Air Vice-Marshal David Carnegie, Station Commander from 1938 to 1940 of RAF Wittering, and Director of Flying Training from 1942 to 1945 at the Air Ministry (1908–15)
- Professor Brian Carpenter, Internet engineer (1956–64)
- David Carter, Professor of Industrial Design Engineering from 1991 to 1995 at the Royal College of Art (1939–46)
- Sir Cyril Clarke, made the important discovery for Rhesus-negative mothers (1918–25)
- Stanley Arthur Cook, Regius Professor of Hebrew from 1932 to 1938 at the University of Cambridge
- Deryck Cooke, musician, writer and broadcaster (1932–38)
- Wing Commander Geoffrey Cooper, Labour MP from 1945 to 1951 for Middlesbrough West (1918–25)
- Lieutenant-Colonel Johnny Cooper, one of the founders of the SAS
- Sir Walter Cooper, Australian politician (1903–10)
- Mark Cox, professional tennis player
- Archibald Crawford, 1st Baron Hungarton, Chairman of the NFU (1902–09)
- Sir Thomas Creed, Principal, 1952–1967 of Queen Mary College, and Vice-Chancellor, University of London 1964–1967 (1908–15)
- John Leonard Dawson, Surgeon to the Queen from 1983 to 1990, Serjeant Surgeon from 1990 to 1991, pioneering surgeon, and younger brother of Anthony (1944–51)
- Harold Dexter, organist, Master of the Music from 1956 to 1968 at Southwark Cathedral, and Professor from 1962 to 1985 at the Guildhall School of Music and Drama (1932–39)
- James Essinger, author
- Neil Fletcher, Labour politician, and (last) Leader from 1987 to 1990 of ILEA (1955–62)
- Max Gilbert, principal violist, London Symphony Orchestra (1934 - 1945). Professor of Viola at the Royal Academy of Music from 1948 to 1984.
- Sir John Goldring, a Lord Justice of Appeal (1956–63)
- Michael Green (humorist), known for books such as The Art of Coarse Rugby
- Jonathan Gregory, Director of Music of the UK-Japan Music Society and UK-Japan Choir; Examiner, the Associated Board of the Royal Schools of Music. Previously Organ Scholar, Clare College, Cambridge; Director of Music - Belfast Cathedral 1976–1984; St George's Parish Church, Belfast; Great St Mary's Church, Cambridge; Leicester Cathedral, 1994-2010
- William Hare (1955–62)
- Tom Harris (1903–1983), paleobotanist
- Sir Mark Henig, chairman from 1969 to 1979 of the English Tourist Board (1922–29)
- Stanley Henig, Labour member of parliament from 1966 to 1970 for Lancaster, Professor of European Politics from 1982 to 1997 at the University of Central Lancashire, son of Sir Mark Henig and former husband of Ruth Henig, Baroness Henig (who attended the girls' grammar) (1950–57)
- Michael Anthony (Tony) Higgins, original Chief Executive of UCAS 1992–2003, (1955–63)
- Alan Hill, managing director from 1973 to 1979 of Heinemann (book publisher)
- Simon Hoggart, journalist and broadcaster
- Ken Horn, television director and producer
- Clive Humby, started Tesco Clubcard in 1995 with his wife (1966–73)
- Professor Terence Irwin: Emeritus Professor of Ancient Philosophy Keble College Oxford.
- Oliver Kamm, journalist (1974–81)
- Albert Ernest Knight, professional cricket player (1884–91)
- Barry Letts, Producer of Doctor Who from 1969 to 1974, responsible for the casting of Tom Baker
- Roland Littlewood, Professor of Anthropology and Psychiatry at University College London
- Jon Lord, composer, Hammond organ and piano player (1952–59)
- Sir Patrick Lowry, chairman from 1981 to 1987 of Acas (1931–38)
- Ed McLachlan, cartoonist (1956–59)
- Roger Manvell (briefly), film historian
- Prof Roger Mason, discoverer of Charnia masoni, one of the earliest known fossil animals, in nearby Charnwood Forest, whilst still at the school
- Prof Stephen Mason, Professor of Chemistry from 1970 to 1987 at King's College London and from 1964 to 1970 at the University of East Anglia, who married Joan Banus.
- Prof John Matthews, Professor of Roman History since 1996 and Professor of Classics and History since 2001 at Yale University
- Maj-Gen Frederick Mayes, Director General from 1993 to 1996 of Army Medical Services (1945–52)
- Professor Terence McCormack, Professor of Primary Care Cardiovascular Medicine, President British and Irish Hypertension Society (2021–23)
- Kevin Myers Irish journalist
- Gordon Norton, Sgt Major British Royal Marine Commandos 23 years service 1948-1971 Now living in Western Australia
- John O'Connor, painter (1924–31)
- E. Phillips Oppenheim, novelist and thriller writer (1877–84)
- Bryan Organ, portrait painter (1946–53)
- Geoffrey Owen, Head from 1976 to 1986 of Radio 2, and in charge of the formation of Radio 1 and Radio 2 in 1967, and brought in Terry Wogan
- Prof Ewan Page, Vice-Chancellor from 1979 to 1993 of the University of Reading, and President from 1984 to 1985 of the BCS (1939–46)
- Harry Peach, furniture manufacturer and social campaigner
- Sir Charles Peake, Ambassador to Yugoslavia from 1946 to 1951, and to Greece from 1951 to 1957 (1908–15)
- John Pickering, biologist
- Tim Pigott-Smith, film and television actor (1957–62)
- David Pole, economist (1937–44)
- Rev John Richards, Bishop of Ebbsfleet from 1994 to 1998 (1945–52)
- Daryl Runswick, composer
- Bruce Rushin, designer who designed the first two-pound coin in 1997
- Cedric Smith, statistician (1928–29)
- Henry Neville Southern, ornithologist
- Sir Martin J. Taylor, Professor of Pure Mathematics since 1986 at the University of Manchester (1963–70)
- Gordon F. Taylor, Architect, designed The Library Building at Loughborough University 1959/60 (1930s)
- Lars Tharp, arts and antiques consultant, presenter and speaker, and the ceramics expert on the BBC television programme Antiques Roadshow (1965–1972)
- Prof Bernard Wasserstein, Harriet & Ulrich E. Meyer Prof. of Modern European Jewish History, University of Chicago
- Sir Philip Watts, chairman from 2001 to 2004 of Shell, (1956–63)
- Prof Paul Weatherley (1917-2001) botanist who studied at Oxford with Sir Arthur Tansley (who first described ecology), former professor of botany at the University of Aberdeen, he found how plants regulate water consumption
- A. R. Whatmore, actor (1900–05)
- John Scott Whiteley, Organist Emeritus, York Minster. BBC TV Organist for the 21st-Century Bach series (1961–68)
- Quentin Willson, TV presenter and motoring expert (1968–75)
- Prof Charles Gorrie Wynne, worked for Taylor, Taylor & Hobson (now Cooke Optics) and invented important optical lens techniques, and was Editor from 1954 to 1965 of Optica Acta (1922–29)

== Headmasters ==
- Rev. James Went 1878-1920
- Thomas Kingdom 1920-1947
- J C Larkin 1947-1969
- G A Thompson 1969-1976 (but continued as head of the new Sixth Form college)

== Notable masters ==
- Colin Dexter – Crime writer, Assistant Classics master from 1954 to 1957
- Ted Wragg – Educationalist and academic, Head of German from 1964 to 1966
