= Norma Izard =

English cricketer and manager (1933–2023)

Norma Jean Izard, OBE (née Preston; 9 September 1933 – 30 December 2023) was an English cricketer. She is the longest-serving manager, having managed the England women's cricket team from 1984, in 12 international tours, before stepping down in 1993.

== Early life ==
Izard was born in Beckenham, the only child of William and Olive Preston. Her father was a cricketer for Cornwall. She was educated at Beckenham Grammar School, and then attended Dartford College of Physical Education (now part of University of Greenwich).

== Career ==
At seventeen Izard played for Kent, and the club, Kent Nomads. She then became a teacher of physical education. She was the manager of England women's cricket team between 1984 and 1993. Izard is the longest-serving senior England cricket manager, managing 12 international tours before stepping down, after England won the 1993 World Cup.

Izard was one of the first ten women admitted to the MCC in 1999, as an honorary life member. She served as the last ever president of the Women's Cricket Association (WCA) from 1994 to 1998, overseeing the eventual merger with the English Cricket Board (ECB).

== Charity ==
Izard was a member of the Lady Taverners charity and a trustee of Chance to Shine.

== Personal life ==
Norma was married to Peter Izard in 1955. They had 2 sons together.

Izard died on 30 December 2023, at the age of 90.

== Honours and awards ==
Izard was appointed an Officer of the Order of the British Empire (OBE) for services to women's cricket in the Queen's 1995 Birthday Honours.
