= Cicely Ridley =

British-American mathematician and climatologist (1927–2008)

Elizabeth Cicely Ridley (née Taylor, September 26, 1927 – December 23, 2008) was a British-American applied mathematician known for her work in numerical quantum chemistry and in climate modeling. The Roble–Dickinson–Ridley code that she and her collaborators created at the National Center for Atmospheric Research was the first general circulation model of the thermosphere.

== Life ==
Ridley was born in Leicester, England on September 26, 1927, the older of two sisters. She became head girl at the Wyggeston Grammar School for Girls, now incorporated into Regent College, Leicester, and went up to Newnham College, Cambridge on a scholarship in 1947. She earned a master's degree in physics in 1951, with first-class honours, in 1951, and remained at Cambridge as a doctoral student of Douglas Hartree, completing her Ph.D. in 1955. Her dissertation was Some Studies of Atomic Structure.

After finishing her doctorate, she became a researcher at the United Kingdom Atomic Energy Authority, at what is now the Harwell Science and Innovation Campus; her work there involved computing the electron configuration of uranium, and applied mathematician John P. Boyd has called her "a pathfinder in numerical quantum chemistry" for this work. Her husband, Brian Ward Ridley, also came to work at Harwell; they had four children beginning in 1957, and Ridley retired from her work in 1958 to become a housewife.

In 1964, Ridley and her family moved to Colorado, following her husband, who became a professor of physics at the University of Colorado. She joined the National Center for Atmospheric Research in 1968, working for them on computer codes for climate modeling of both the Earth and Venus. Before 1972, when Margaret Anne LeMone joined NCAR, she was one of only three doctoral-level women researchers at NCAR, together with Joan Feynman and Sue Anne Bowling. It was in her work at NCAR that Ridley created the Roble–Dickinson–Ridley code for general circulation modeling of the thermosphere.

She retired in 1995, and died in Louisville, Colorado on December 23, 2008.

== Selected publications ==
- Ridley, E. Cicely (October 1955), "The self-consistent field for Mo^{+}", Mathematical Proceedings of the Cambridge Philosophical Society, 51 (4): 702–706, Bibcode:1955PCPS...51..702R, doi:10.1017/s0305004100030772
- Ridley, E. Cicely (1957), "A numerical method of solving second-order linear differential equations with two-point boundary conditions", Mathematical Proceedings of the Cambridge Philosophical Society, 53 (2): 442–447, Bibcode:1957PCPS...53..442R, doi:10.1017/S0305004100032424, MR 0086395
- Dickinson, Robert E.; Ridley, E. C. (June 1975), "A numerical model for the dynamics and composition of the Venusian thermosphere", Journal of the Atmospheric Sciences, 32 (6): 1219–1231, Bibcode:1975JAtS...32.1219D, doi:10.1175/1520-0469(1975)032<1219:anmftd>2.0.co;2
- Dickinson, Robert E.; Ridley, E. C.; Roble, R. G. (1981), "A three-dimensional general circulation model of the thermosphere", Journal of Geophysical Research, 86 (A3): 1499, Bibcode:1981JGR....86.1499D, doi:10.1029/ja086ia03p01499
- Roble, R. G.; Ridley, E. C.; Richmond, A. D.; Dickinson, R. E. (November 1988), "A coupled thermosphere/ionosphere general circulation model", Geophysical Research Letters, 15 (12): 1325–1328, Bibcode:1988GeoRL..15.1325R, doi:10.1029/gl015i012p01325
- Richmond, A. D.; Ridley, E. C.; Roble, R. G. (March 1992), "A thermosphere/ionosphere general circulation model with coupled electrodynamics", Geophysical Research Letters, 19 (6): 601–604, Bibcode:1992GeoRL..19..601R, doi:10.1029/92gl00401
