= Wyggeston and Queen Elizabeth I College =

Location
- University Road; Leicester, LE1 7RJ; United Kingdom; 52°37′10″N 01°07′24″W

Information
- Type: Sixth Form College
- Motto: Labore et Honore
- Established: 1976
- Founder: Thomas Wyggeston
- Local authority: Leicester
- Department for Education URN: 130756 Tables
- Ofsted: Reports
- Principal: Paul Wilson
- Age: 16 to 19
- Enrollment: c.2000
- Precursor institutions: Wyggeston Grammar School for Boys; Wyggeston Grammar School for Girls; Regent College
- Website: https://www.wqe.ac.uk/

Wyggeston and Queen Elizabeth I College (WQE) is a sixth form college, located in Leicester, England. The college is led by Paul Wilson who was appointed the eighth principal in March 2018. The college merged with the nearby Regent College in 2018 to form an institution with approximately 3,750 full-time 16–18-year-old students and 140 teaching staff. More than 40 subjects are offered at A Level.

The college was awarded Learning and Skills Beacon Status in April 2003.

== History ==
The college, which has over 3,750 students, was founded in 1976 following a (comprehensive) re-organisation of secondary education in the city. Many other parts of rural Leicestershire had gone comprehensive in 1968.

The college now occupies a site adjoining Victoria Park and the University of Leicester that was previously occupied by Wyggeston Grammar School for Boys (also known as Wyggeston Boys' School).

The school takes the Wyggeston name from the former school and from Wyggeston Grammar School for Girls, which both closed in the 1970s.

In 1976 the site of the former girls' school became Wyggeston Collegiate Sixth Form College, known as Regent College between 1996 and 2018, when it merged with Wyggeston and Queen Elizabeth I College.

== Principals ==
- Dr G A Thompson – 1978-1994 (also head of the former grammar school from 1968)
- Dr Robert Wilkinson – 1994-2002
- Ian Wilson – 2002–2012
- Sandra Hamilton-Fox - 2012–2016
- Paul Wilson – 2018–present

== Curriculum ==
Courses including AS, A2 and GCSEs are provided at the College. The International Baccalaureate (IB) Diploma was introduced in September 2006 with 33 students opting for this alternative. The last cohort of the IB completed the course in 2012, and the programme is no longer offered.

=== Academic performance ===
In 2006 the A Level pass rate was 98 per cent with 45 per cent at grades A and B. About 90% of students progress to higher education, mostly in the Midlands region.

== Notable former students ==
- Bali Rai, novelist
- Ben Youngs, Rugby Union player for England and Leicester Tigers
- Dan Cole, Rugby Union player for England and Leicester Tigers
- Shivani Raja, Member of Parliament
