= William Hare (philosopher) =

British philosopher (born 1944)

William Francis Hare
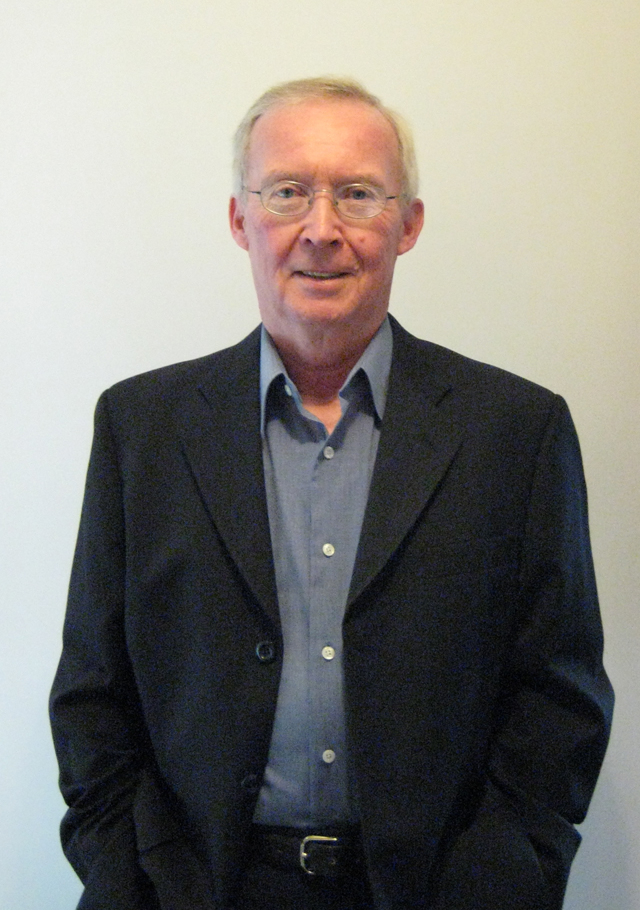
- Born: February 7, 1944 (age 82)

Philosophical work
- Region: Western Philosophy
- Main interests: Philosophy of Education

William Hare (born February 7, 1944) is a philosopher whose writings deal primarily with problems in philosophy of education. He attended Wyggeston Grammar School for Boys, 1955–62. After receiving his B.A. from the University of London (1965), he gained an M.A. in philosophy from the University of Leicester (1968), and a Ph.D. in educational theory from the University of Toronto (1971). He was Professor of Education and Philosophy at Dalhousie University from 1970 to 1995, and subsequently Professor of Education at Mount Saint Vincent University until his retirement in June 2008. He is now Professor Emeritus. He is known mainly for his work on open-mindedness, and has published several papers dealing with philosophical ideas about education in the work of Bertrand Russell.

== Selected books ==
- Open-mindedness and Education (1979)
- In Defence of Open-mindedness (1985)
- What Makes a Good Teacher (1993)

== Edited works ==
(with John P. Portelli)

- Philosophy of Education: Introductory Readings (1988, 1996, 2001)
- Key Questions For Educators (2005)

== Publications ==
- — (2020). "Socratic open-mindedness" (PDF). Paideusis. 18 (1): 5–16. doi:10.7202/1072334ar. S2CID 170391207.
- — (2009). "What open-mindedness requires" (PDF). Skeptical Inquirer. 33 (1): 36–39.
- — (2007). Cohen, Elliot D (ed.). "Why philosophy for educators?". International Journal of Applied Philosophy. 21 (2): 149–59. doi:10.5840/ijap20072122.
- — (2007). "Credibility and credulity: Monitoring teachers for trustworthiness". Journal of Philosophy of Education. 41 (2): 207–19. doi:10.1111/j.1467-9752.2007.00557.x.
- — (2006). "Why open-mindedness matters". Think. 5 (13): 7–15. doi:10.1017/S1477175600001482. S2CID 146668459.
- — (2004). "Assessing one's own open-mindedness". Philosophy Now. 47: 26–28. Archived from the original on 2017-07-05.
- — (2003). Cohen, Elliot D (ed.). "Is it good to be open-minded?". International Journal of Applied Philosophy. 17 (1): 73–87. doi:10.5840/ijap20031718.
- — (2001). "Bertrand Russell and the ideal of critical receptiveness". Skeptical Inquirer. 25 (3): 40–44.
