= Stanley Henig =

British academic and Labour Party politician

Member of Parliament for Lancaster
- In office 31 March 1966 – 18 June 1970
- Preceded by: Humphry Berkeley
- Succeeded by: Elaine Kellett-Bowman

Leader of Lancaster City Council
- In office 1995–1999

Deputy Pro-Chancellor of Lancaster University
- In office 2006–2011

Personal details
- Born: 7 July 1939 (age 87) Leicester, England
- Spouse: Ruth Munzer (m. 1966; div. 1993)
- Children: 2, including Simon Henig
- Parent: Mark Henig (father)
- Education: Corpus Christi College, Oxford

Stanley Henig (born 7 July 1939) is a British academic and former Labour Party politician. He was Deputy Pro-Chancellor of Lancaster University from 2006 until 2011.

== Early life ==
Stanley Henig was born on 7 July 1939 in Leicester, the son of the politician and businessman Sir Mark Henig, Lord Mayor of Leicester and the first chairman of the English Tourist Board. He was educated at Wyggeston Grammar School for Boys and Corpus Christi College, Oxford.

== Career ==
An academic political scientist, he was one of the founders of the Department of Politics at Lancaster University in 1964. He later taught at the University of Warwick, the Civil Service College, and at the University of Central Lancashire where he was head of the Department of Politics and European Studies.

At the 1966 general election, Henig was returned to the House of Commons as Member of Parliament for Lancaster. However, he lost his seat at the 1970 general election to the Conservative Party candidate, Elaine Kellett-Bowman, and did not stand again. He entered local politics, and in the 1990s he was leader of Lancaster City Council.

He was leader of the council at the time of the Blobbygate scandal and subsequently was deseated by the Greens at the 1999 council elections, although a later report by the district auditor cleared councillors of maladministration.

== Personal life ==
His former wife, Ruth Henig, was a historian and also a long-serving member of Lancashire County Council. She stood unsuccessfully as Labour candidate for Lancaster at the 1992 general election and became a life peer in 2004.

They married in 1966 but divorced in 1993, having had two sons, one of whom is the psephologist Simon Henig. In 2008 Simon followed in his father's footsteps by becoming Leader of the Labour-controlled Durham County Council, a role he held until 2021.

Parliament of the United Kingdom
Preceded by Humphry Berkeley	Member of Parliament for Lancaster; 1966–1970	Succeeded by Elaine Kellett-Bowman
