= David Pole (economist) =

English health economist and civil servant (1926–2021)

John David Pole (15 March 1926 – 25 May 2021), commonly known as David Pole, was an English health economist and civil servant. He was the Chief Economic Adviser to the Department of Health and Social Security in the early 1980s.

Born on 15 March 1926, Pole's father John was a schoolteacher and his mother Gertrude (née Bloor) was an accounts clerk. He attended Wyggeston Grammar School for Boys in Leicester. He served in the Intelligence Corps during and after the Second World War. He then enrolled at Queens' College, Cambridge, to study economics, graduating in 1951.

Pole was appointed to a lectureship at University College, Cardiff, in 1951; there, he increasingly specialised in health economics. He was promoted to a senior lectureship in 1969, but left the next year on appointment as the senior economic adviser at the Department of Health and Social Security, a post he held until 1976. During that time, he was instrumental in setting up the Resource Allocation Working Party, which advocated for a fairer regional distribution of health care resources; Pole was also closely involved in the statistical analysis which formed a large part of this work. From 1977 to 1980, he was head of the public services division at HM Treasury, before being appointed Chief Economist to the DHSS.

After retiring from the civil service at the end of 1983, he became a pub landlord in south Wales. He died on 25 May 2021; his wife Violet (née Woodruff, a youth employment and social worker) survived him as did their four daughters.
