= Simon Henig =

British politician (born 1969)

Simon Henig CBE

Leader of Durham County Council
- In office 23 May 2008 – 26 May 2021
- Preceded by: Albert Nugent
- Succeeded by: Amanda Hopgood

Chair of the North East Combined Authority
- In office 15 April 2014 – 7 May 2024
- Preceded by: authority established
- Succeeded by: authority abolished

Personal details
- Born: Simon Antony Henig; June 1969 (age 57) Lancaster, England
- Spouse: Katherine Henig
- Children: 2
- Parents: Stanley Henig (father); Ruth Henig (mother)
- Relatives: Mark Henig (grandfather)
- Education: Lancaster Royal Grammar School Corpus Christi College, Oxford

Simon Antony Henig CBE (born June 1969) is a British politician, former leader of Durham County Council, and from April 2014 to May 2025 was chair of the North East Combined Authority (NECA).

== Early life ==
Simon Henig was born in June 1969, the son of the former Labour MP and Lancaster council leader Stanley Henig, and the historian Ruth Henig. Simon's grandfather, Sir Mark Henig, served as Lord Mayor of Leicester and led the English Tourist Board. He was educated at Moorside Primary School, Lancaster, Lancaster Royal Grammar School and Corpus Christi College, Oxford.

== Career ==
=== Politics ===
In 1999, Henig was first elected as a councillor in the County Durham town of Chester-le-Street.

From 2001 to 2008, Henig was the agent for North Durham CLP, and chair of the North East Regional Board. In 2007, Henig was runner-up to be the Labour candidate to replace Tony Blair as MP for Sedgefield.

From May 2008 until May 2021, Henig was Leader of Durham County Council. In 2013, Henig led his local Labour Party to a substantially increased majority and a council group of 94, the largest in the UK, although that was reduced to 74 in 2017. He is the chair of the Association of Labour Councillors. Henig is chair of the County Durham Partnership Board, a member of Labour's National Policy Forum and Chair of the Regional Board.

Henig was appointed Commander of the Order of the British Empire (CBE) in the 2016 New Year Honours.

=== Academia ===
Henig is a lecturer in politics at the University of Sunderland, specialising in psephology, the branch of political science which deals with the study and scientific analysis of elections.

== Publications ==
Henig's publications include The Political Map of Britain, Politico's Guides to the 2005 and 2010 General Elections and Women and Political Power: Europe since 1945.

== Personal life ==
Henig's wife Katherine was also a Labour councillor, but lost her seat in 2017. She was first elected in 2013, when she took the ward of Chester-le-Street South from the Liberal Democrats. The couple have two children and live in Chester-le-Street. Henig's interests include travel, football and cricket.
