= Peter Harper (geneticist) =

British physician (1939–2021)

Sir Peter Harper CBE
- Born: Peter Stanley Harper; 28 April 1939; Barnstaple, Devon, England
- Died: 23 January 2021 (aged 81)
- Known for: Work on muscular dystrophy and Huntington's disease
- Scientific career
- Fields: Neurogenetics
- Workplaces: Cardiff University; University of Wales College of Medicine; UK Human Genetics Commission; Advisory Committee on Genetic testing Nuffield Council on Bioethics

Sir Peter Stanley Harper CBE FLS FRCP (28 April 1939 – 23 January 2021) was a British physician and academic who was University Research Professor (Emeritus) in Human Genetics at Cardiff University. His work focused on researching neurogenetics and has resulted in discoveries concerning muscular dystrophies and Huntington's disease. He was knighted in 2004 for services to medicine.

== Work ==
Until 2004, Sir Peter was Professor of Medical Genetics at the University of Wales College of Medicine, Cardiff. He helped to develop the All Wales Medical Genomics Service (AWMGS) and has been a member of the UK Human Genetics Commission and Advisory Committee on Genetic testing. He was a member of the Nuffield Council on Bioethics 2004-2010. As a consultant to the History of Modern Biomedicine Research Group, he has contributed to several oral histories which address recent developments in clinical genetics in the UK.

== Honours and awards ==
He delivered the Lumleian Lecture to the Royal College of Physicians in 1995. He was appointed a Commander of the Order of the British Empire (CBE) in the 1995 Birthday Honours for services to Medical Genetics and was knighted in the 2004 Birthday Honours, for services to Medicine.

== Books ==
- Practical Genetic Counselling, 1998 Hodder Arnold
- Myotonic Dystrophy: The Facts, 2002
- Landmarks in Medical Genetics, 2004 OUP
- First Years of Human Chromosomes, 2006 Scion Press
- A Short History of Medical Genetics, 2008. OUP
