= Mark Henig =

British politician and businessman

Sir Mark Henig
- Born: 11 February 1911; Leicester, England
- Died: 30 January 1979 (aged 67)
- Children: Stanley Henig
- Relatives: Simon Henig (grandson)

Sir Mark Henig (11 February 1911 – 30 January 1979) was a British politician and businessman, Lord Mayor of Leicester and the first chairman of the English Tourist Board.

== Early life ==
Mark Henig was born in Leicester on 11 February 1911. He was educated at Wyggeston Grammar School for Boys.

== Career ==
After leaving school, Henig went to work for his father's company, the Leicester wholesale textile distributors, Henig & Sons Limited, where he later became a director. He was elected as a Labour member to Leicester City Council in 1945, and remained one until 1970. From 1949 to 1962, he was secretary and whip of the Labour group. In 1965, he became the leader of the group. He was an alderman from 1958–70, and was High Bailiff in 1965.

Henig was chairman of the Association of Municipal Corporations from 1966 to 1967, and of the East Midland Economic Council from 1968 to 1971. Henig was Lord Mayor of Leicester from 1967 to 1968, one of three Jewish men (the others being Sir Israel Hart and Cecil Harris) who had been mayor or lord mayor of Leicester.

In 1969, Henig was appointed to the Royal Commission on the Constitution, headed by Lord Crowther and later Lord Kilbrandon which was set the task of examining the UK constitution. It produced a lengthy report four years later.

In 1969, Henig was the first chairman of the English Tourist Board, a role in which he continued for ten years until his death in 1979. He was twice president of the Leicester Hebrew Congregation, and a passionate supporter of Israel.

== Honours and awards ==
He was knighted in 1965 for services to Leicester.

== Personal life ==
His son, Stanley Henig, was a Labour MP and Lancaster council leader. His grandson Simon Henig is also a Labour politician and in 2009 became the leader of Durham County Council.
