= Ruth Bird =

English historian and schoolteacher

Ruth Bird (26 May 1899 — 24 January 1987) was an English historian and schoolteacher.

Born in London, Bird performed exceptionally well during her education, and received a master's degree in history at Bedford College, London in 1922, becoming the first person to earn a distinction in the subject. From 1923 until her retirement, Bird was a schoolteacher, a profession she excelled at, remembered as a "inspirational and enthusiastic" teacher. Bird also engaged in some historical scholarship. She composed a history of London guilds during the reign of Richard II and edited the journal of Giles Moore, clergyman of Horsted Keynes; this town was the subject of much of her study after retirement. Bird died in 1987 and was buried in Horsted Keynes. She was memorialised by those who knew her as a "devout and faithful" Christian and "perhaps the greatest [teacher] I ever met".

== Early life and education ==
Bird was born on 26 May 1899 to George Bird (1863–1912), entrepreneur and engineer, and his wife, Theresa Mary (1867–1953), at their home on 62 St Quintin Avenue, Kensington, London. On her paternal side, Bird was descended from a well-off, 19th-century merchant background, but, after George Bird's death in 1912, the family found themselves in some financial difficulty. Bird entered the boarding school of Elstree Grange in Eastbourne in 1909, where she performed exceptionally well in exams.

Bird left Elstree in 1917 to attend Bedford College, London, where she remained until 1922. She took her BA examinations in 1920, where she was the only historian to receive first-class honours. In May 1921, she was awarded the inaugural grant of the Amy Lady Tate scholarship. This covered her tuition fees and awarded her use of Institute of Historical Research while she studied at Belford, under the supervision of Jeffries Davis and J. W. Allen. She was awarded her master's degree in December 1922, the ninth history master's the college had granted, and its first distinction. Her master's thesis was entitled "Civic factions in London and their relation to political parties, 1376–1399"

== Teaching career ==
In 1923, after leaving Belford, Bird began teaching at Truro High School, Cornwall; in 1926, she left for Wyggeston Grammar School for Girls, Leicester, where she would remain until her retirement in 1959. She became a senior mistress of the school, though during her 33 year tenure she chose to obtain no teaching qualifications. She was remembered as a remarkable teacher. D. Anne Welch, writing for the Oxford Dictionary of National Biography, memorialised her as an educator who "loved her chosen career, and was an inspirational and enthusiastic classroom teacher". Professor Claire Cross, a former pupil and professor emeritus of history at the University of York, described Bird as "perhaps the greatest [teacher] I ever met".

== Scholarship ==
Twenty-seven years after its composition, Bird prepared her master's thesis into a book-length publication, having made some revisions at the London School of Economics in 1935–6. The Turbulent London of Richard II (1949) analysed the convoluted shifting of alliances between the guilds of London during the reign of Richard II (r. 1377-99). According to Welch, this publication revealed "deep political and personal complexities, which have precluded any subsequent simplistic assessment of the situation". The monograph was published with an introduction from prominent English historian James Tait, who had died four years before its publication.

After her retirement, Bird mainly studied the local history of Horsted Keynes, Sussex. Bird edited the "day books" of Giles Moore, clergyman of the parish church of St Giles, for the Sussex Record Society, published under the title: The Journal of Giles Moore, 1656–1679 (1971). The book was reviewed favourably by A. Tindal Hart, writing for the Journal of Ecclesiastical History, who described that, while ostensively dull in subject matter, in its pages "there emerges the vivid portrait of a seventeenth century country rector in relation to his home and family, his parishioners, and the authorities in Church and State". Moore's detailed accounts of his personal and household expenditures have come to be recognised as an important source for the history of English provincial clothing during Moore's lifetime.

In Leicester, Bird co-wrote the Victoria County History entries on Humberstone and Knighton for the series' 1958 publication on Leicestershire. As of her death, Ruth Bird was co-writing a history of a 17th-century school in Horsted Keynes.

== Personal life, character, and death ==
Welch memorialised Bird as "a small, slight figure, with a short severe hair cut, Ruth Bird possessed great natural authority and a remarkably warm smile. She dressed simply, lived humbly, and owned little." Bird was an Anglican, and a member of the Third Order of Saint Francis, the reason for her frugal lifestyle. Her vicar at Horsted Keynes described her as "practising Christian, devout and faithful in her prayer life, in worship and private study". According to Welch, Bird was also a keen traveller and "emphasized the international perspective to history as a means of furthering peace among nations".

Bird's health deteriorated in later years, developing a weak chest. On 24 January 1987, She died at Princess Royal Hospital in Haywards Heath aged eighty-seven. She was cremated and her ashes were buried in St Giles churchyard on 31 January 1987. Her will was probated at £126,919 on 15 May 1987.

== Bibliography ==
- The Turbulent London of Richard II (Longmans; 1949)
- (ed.) The Journal of Giles Moore, 1656–1679 (Sussex Record Society. 68; 1971)
- "The Lightmaker Free School, Horsted Keynes, in the Eighteenth and Early Nineteenth Centuries". Sussex History. 2 (7). (1984)
