= Langley Park School for Girls =

Secondary school in Beckenham, Kent, England

Location
- Hawksbrook Lane; Beckenham, Kent, BR3 3BE; England
- 51°23′18″N 0°01′04″W

Information
- Type: Academy
- Motto: Ad Rem Mox Nox; Time is Short, Get to Work
- Established: 1919
- Department for Education URN: 137006 Tables
- Ofsted: Reports
- Head teacher: Stephen Whittle
- Gender: Girls
- Age: 11 to 18
- Enrolment: As of 2023, 1711
- Capacity: As of 2023, 1642
- Houses: Gamma, Sigma, Lambda and Kappa
- Colours: Green, Red, Yellow and Blue
- Website: www.lpgs.bromley.sch.uk

Langley Park School for Girls (also known as Langley Park Girls' School, LPGS, or just Langley Girls) is a girls' secondary academy school in Beckenham in the London Borough of Bromley, England, with a mixed-sex sixth form.

The school motto is "Ad Rem Mox Nox", which roughly translates as "Time is short, get to work" or more specifically "Get it done before nightfall". In the 1960s, the official translation of the motto was "Work, for the night cometh".

== History ==
The building at the school's first location (on Lennard Road, Beckenham) was completed in 1914. It was, however, used as a military hospital during World War I.

The school itself opened on 28 September 1919 as Beckenham County School for Girls, with 153 pupils aged from 8 years, and 10 teachers. The first headmistress was Miss E.M. Fox. A few years later, an association for ex-pupils was formed, called the Adremian Association.

In 1945, the name of the school was changed to The County Grammar School for Girls, and in 1955 to Beckenham Grammar School for Girls. In 1959, the school moved to new buildings in a parkland setting, in Park Langley. The current name "Langley Park School for Girls" was adopted in 1968.

In 1976 the school became comprehensive. In 1996 it became a technology college, and in 2000 it became part of the South East England Virtual Education Action Zone.

In July 2009, the school celebrated its 50th anniversary during the last week of school in the summer. This included music, dancing and a commemorative event - bringing the Olympic torch into the school.

On 1 August 2011, the school gained academy status.

=== Headmistresses/Headmasters ===
- Miss E.M. Fox 1919-1944
- Miss Henshaw 1944-1965
- Miss Chreseson 1964-1966
- Mrs P. Molnar 1967-1972
- Miss Grimsey (Mrs. Scales from 1976) 1973-1977
- Mrs Herzmark 1979-1993
- Miss J.E. Sage 1994-2010
- Dr A. Hudson 2010-2018
- Katie Scott 2018 - 2022
- David Webb 2023-2023
- Helen Ralston 2023-2024
- Steve Whittle 2024- present.

== Notable former pupils ==
The County Grammar School for Girls

- Alison Prince

Beckenham Grammar School

- Norma Izard, cricketer

Langley Park School for Girls

- Ellen Gandy, swimmer
- Georgina Kennedy, 2022 Commonwealth Games squash gold medallist
- Kate Lawler, winner of the third series of Big Brother UK

== See also ==
- Langley Park School for Boys
