= George Brown (sociologist) =

British medical sociologist (1930–2026)

George William Brown OBE FBA (15 November 1930 – 28 August 2026) was a British medical sociologist who worked in the field of social nature of mental illness.

== Life and work ==
Brown was born in Portobello, London, on 15 November 1930, as one of non-identical twins. His father was a lens maker and his mother had been a waitress. He left school at 16 and initially moved between a number of jobs, including work in the Post Office. In 1948, he was called up for national service in the Air Force. He then went to University College London in 1951, studying archaeology and anthropology. After a series of jobs he obtained a research post at the Social Psychiatry Research Unit at the Maudsley Hospital. It was here that he began his research into schizophrenia.

In the second half of the 1950s, Brown introduced the Expressed-Emotion-Concept, which since then has been broadly being adopted among researchers and practitioners in the fields of social psychiatry, psychiatry and therapy in general.

In 1968 he moved to the Social Research Unit at Bedford College, London, where he became first deputy director, then joint Director. It was here that he developed his research into the social aspects of depression. He also developed with Margot Jefferys a MSc in medical sociology.

Brown died on 28 August 2026, aged 95.

== Publications ==
- Wing, J.K., & Brown, G.W. (1970). Institutionalism and Schizophrenia: A Comparative Study of Three Mental Hospitals 1960–1968. Cambridge; Cambridge University Press.
- Brown, G.W., & Harris, T. (1978). Social origins of depression: A study of psychiatric disorder in women. London:Tavistock.

== Awards ==
- 1986 Fellow of the British Academy
- 1995 OBE in the 1995 Birthday Honours
- 2002 DUniv, University of Essex
