= Sussex Record Society =

Text publication society specialising in Sussex-based historical records

Sussex Record Society

The Sussex Record Society is a text publication society founded in 1901. It publishes scholarly editions of historical records related to the English county of Sussex. It is a registered charity.

== Selected publications ==
- Church Surveys of Chichester Archdeaconry 1602, 1610 & 1636, Vol. 98. 2016.
- Chichester Archdeaconry Depositions 1603–1608, Vol. 97. 2015.
- Letters of John Collier of Hastings 1731–1746, Vol. 96. 2014.
- Littlehampton School Logbook 1871–1911, Vol. 95. 2013.
- Winchelsea Poor Law Records 1790–1841. Malcolm Pratt, Vol. 94. 2012.
- East Sussex Church Monuments 1530–1830. Nigel Llewellyn, Vol. 93. s. 2010/11
- Accounts and Records of the Manor of Mote in Iden 1441–1551, 1673. Mark Gardiner and Christopher Whittick, Vol. 92. 2009.
- Sussex Clergy Inventories 1660–1750. Annabelle Hughes, Vol. 91. 2008.
- The Durford Cartulary. Janet Stevenson, Vol. 90. 2007.
- East Sussex Coroners’ Records 1688–1838. Roy Hunnisett, Vol. 89. 2006.
- Sussex Cricket in the Eighteenth Century. Timothy J. McCann, Vol. 88. 2005.
- East Sussex Parliamentary Deposited Plans 1799–1970. Roger Davey, Vol. 87. 2003.
- Sussex Shore to Flanders Fields: Heron-Allens Journal of the Great War. Brian W. Harvey and Carol Fitzgerald, Vol. 86. 2002.
- Sussex Depicted – Views and descriptions 1600–1800. John H. Farrant, Vol. 85. 2001.
- Sussex in the First World War. Keith Grieves, Vol. 84. 2004.
- Mid Sussex Poor Law Records, 1601–1835. Ian Nelson & Norma Pilbeam, Vol. 83. 2002.
- West Sussex Land Tax, 1785. Alan Readman, Lionel Falconer, Rosie Ritchie & Peter Wilkinson, Vol. 82. 2001.
- Sussex Schools in the 18th Century. John Caffyn, Vol. 81 1998.
- The Ashdown Forest Dispute 1876–1882. Brian Short 1997, Vol. 80 1997.
- Saint Richard of Chichester. David Jones, Vol. 79 1995.
- Chichester Diocesan Surveys, 1686 and 1724 Wyn K. Ford, Vol. 78 1994.
- East Sussex Land Tax, 1785. Roger Davey, Vol. 77 1991.
- The Fuller Letters, 1728–1755. David Crossley & Richard Saville, Vol. 76 1991.
- The Religious Census of Sussex. John A, Vickers, Vol. 75 1989.
- Sussex Coroners Inquests, 1485–1558. R. F. Hunnisett, Vol. 74 1985.
- Correspondence of the Dukes of Richmond and Newcastle, 1724–1750. Timothy J. McCann, Vol. 73 1984.
- Printed Maps of Sussex 1575–1900. David Kingsley, Vol. 72 1982.
- Accounts of the Roberts Family of Boarzell, 1568–1582. Robert Tittler, Vol. 71 1979.
- The Town Book of Lewes, 1837–1901, Verena Smith, Vol. 70 1976.
- The Town Book of Lewes, 1702–1837, Verena Smith, Vol. 69 1973
- The Journal of Giles Moore of Horsted Keynes, 1655–1679. Ruth Bird, Vol. 68 1971
- Estate Surveys of the Fitzalan Earls of Arundel, 14th century. Marie Clough, Vol. 67 1969.
- A Catalogue of Sussex Estate and Tithe Award Maps, Part II, 1597–1958. Francis W. Steer, Vol. 66 1968.
- Cellarers Rolls of Battle Abbey. Eleanor Searle & Barbara Ross, Vol. 65 1967.
- Rye Shipping Records, 1556–1590. Richard F. Dell, Vol. 64 1966
- The Book of Bartholomew Bolney, 15th century. Marie Clough, Vol. 63 1964
- Minutes of the Common Council of the City of Chichester, 1783–1826. Francis W. Steer, Vol. 62 1963.
- A Catalogue of Sussex Estate and Tithe Award Maps, Part I, 1606–1884. Francis W. Steer, Vol. 61 1962.
- Custumals of the Manors of Laughton, Willingdon and Goring, 1292–1338. A. E. Wilson, Vol. 60 1962.
- Chartulary of Boxgrove Priory, 12th-14th centuries. Lindsay Fleming, Vol. 59. s 1960.
- Chapter Acts, Chichester, 1545–1642. W. D. Peckham, Vol. 58 1960.
- Custumals of Sussex Manors of the Archbishop of Canterbury, 1285–1330. B.C Redwood & A. E. Wilson, Vol. 57 1958.
- Lay Subsidy Rolls, 1524–1525. Julian Cornwall, Vol. 56 1957
- Ministers Accounts of the Manor of Petworth, 1347–1353. L. F. Salzman, Vol. 55 1955.
- Quarter Sessions Order Book, 1642–1649. B.C Redwood, Vol. 54 1954.
- The Manor of Etchingham cum Salehurst. Sir Sylvanus P, Vivian, Vol. 53 1953.
- Chapter Acts, Chichester, 1472–1544. W. D. Peckham, Vol. 52 1952.
- Sussex Views from the Burrell Collection 1776–1791. Walter H Godfrey and L.F. Salzman. Jubilee Vol. 1951.
- Record of Deputations of Gamekeepers. L. F. Salzman, Vol. 51 1951.
- Churchwardens Presentments, Part I, Archdeaconry of Lewes. Hilda Johnstone, Vol. 50 1950.
