= Elizabeth Esteve-Coll =

British academic and museum director (1938–2024)

Elizabeth Esteve-Coll DBE
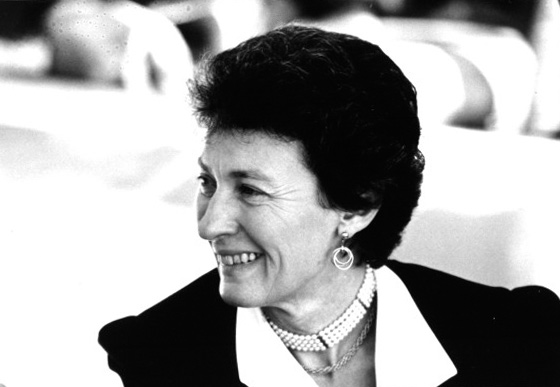
- Born: Elizabeth Anne Loosemore Kingdon; 14 October 1938; Ripon, England
- Died: 16 September 2024 (aged 85)
- Education: Trinity College, Dublin; Birkbeck, University of London
- Occupations: Academic, museum director, librarian
- Spouse: José Esteve-Coll (m. 1959)

Dame Elizabeth Anne Loosemore Esteve-Coll DBE FRSA (née Kingdon; 14 October 1938 – 16 September 2024) was a British academic, museum director and librarian.

== Early life and education ==
Esteve-Coll was born in Ripon, West Riding of Yorkshire, the daughter of Percy Kingdon, a bank clerk, and his wife Nora Rose. She was educated at Darlington High School and read English and Spanish at Trinity College, Dublin and Art History at Birkbeck College (now Birkbeck, University of London).

== Career ==
Esteve-Coll was head of learning resources at Kingston Polytechnic (now Kingston University London) from 1977 to 1982. In 1982 she became the first female director of the University of Surrey Library. In 1985 she became the Keeper of the National Art Library at the Victoria and Albert Museum. She then instigated various changes to make the library more accessible to a broader audience. Esteve-Coll became the UK's first woman director of a national arts collection when she was appointed director of the Victoria and Albert Museum in 1987, succeeding Sir Roy Strong. She resigned in 1994, midway through her second term as director, to take up the Vice-Chancellorship of the University of East Anglia. Alan Borg succeeded her as its new director, taking the post on 1 October 1995.

Esteve-Coll served as Vice-Chancellor of the University of East Anglia from 1995 to 1997, but was forced to step down after being diagnosed with multiple sclerosis. She said at the time: "It is with real sadness and disappointment that I must acknowledge that I am not able to lead the university into the 21st century." She served as Chancellor of University of Lincoln for seven years, as well as being a Trustee of the Sainsbury Institute for the Study of Japanese Arts and Cultures since its foundation in January 1999.

== Marriage ==
At the age of 21, she married Spanish refugee sea captain José Esteve-Coll, 30 years her senior. He died in 1980.

== Honours ==
Esteve-Coll was made a Dame Commander of the Order of the British Empire (DBE) in the Queen's Birthday Honours list in 1995.

She received the Order of the Rising Sun, Gold Rays with Neck Ribbon (3rd class) in November 2005 in recognition of her "outstanding contribution to the promotion of Japanese culture and studies to British people".

In November 2008, she was presented with an honorary doctorate of arts and made Chancellor Emerita by the University of Lincoln during her farewell ceremony at Lincoln Cathedral.

== Death ==
Esteve-Coll died on 16 September 2024, at the age of 85.

== Bibliography ==
- Books by My Bedside (1989)

Academic offices
Preceded by none	Chancellor of the University of Lincoln; 2001–2008	Succeeded by Lord Adebowale
