= Charles Gorrie Wynne =

British engineer (1911–1999)

Charles Gorrie Wynne FRS (18 May 1911 – 1 October 1999) was an English optics designer, a significant figure in optical lens design.

He was born in Leicester and educated at Wyggeston Grammar School for Boys and Exeter College, Oxford, where his studies were interrupted by tuberculosis. He started work at a local lens manufacturing company, Taylor, Taylor and Hobson of Leicester. In 1943 he moved to work at Wray (Optical Works) in Kent, where he worked until 1960, designing a wide range of significant optical systems. In 1960 he joined the Technical Optics Section at Imperial College, London as director of the Optical Design Group, a position he held until 1978. Whilst there he and several colleagues formed the company IC Optical Systems to manufacture specialist scientific optical instruments, which eventually moved out of the university to become an independent company. In 1978 he left Imperial College to work on telescope design at Greenwich Observatory, finally moving in 1987 to the Institute of Astronomy at the University of Cambridge.

He was elected a Fellow of the Royal Society in 1970. His candidature citation read: "C.G. Wynne is distinguished for his work in aberration theory and for his development of new mathematical methods embodied in the first successful computer programmes for the optimisation of optical systems of many kinds. In high performance optical instruments complicated lens systems are usually needed, systems of up to 50 parameters are common and over 100 may be required. Wynne has demonstrated conclusively that computer-aided design can lead to the manufacture of such lenses with substantially improved performance. As a consequence, the programmes he has developed are now in regular use at Imperial College and in industry. Examples of the work undertaken by Wynne include optical systems for sir navigation, for space research, for particle physics (CERN, CEA Saclay, Brookhaven National Laboratory, USA) and for astronomy (for the Isaac Newton Telescope of the Royal Greenwich Observatory, Palomar, Kitt Peak, and McDonald Observatories). Wynne is undertaking work on wide-field correctors for the 150-inch Anglo-Australian Telescope. Prior to 1960, Wynne worked in industry where he was particularly noted for developing, for the RAF, a series of high-performance survey lenses for aerial photography."

== Awards ==
- Young Medal and Prize in 1971
- Rumford Medal in 1982
- Gold Medal of the Royal Astronomical Society in 1988

== Private life ==
He died in Cambridge in 1999. He was married with 3 children.
