= Herbert Hunt (translator) =

English academic, author and translator

Herbert James Hunt (2 August 1899 – 2 November 1973) was an English academic, author and translator, particularly of the novels of Honoré de Balzac.

== Biography ==
Herbert Hunt was born in Lichfield in 1899, the son of James Henry Hunt, a printer compositor, and Mary Ann Hunt. He had one elder brother, Horace, who died in 1935. He briefly saw service in France towards the end of the First World War.

Hunt was educated at Lichfield Cathedral Choir School, Lichfield Grammar School, and at Magdalen College, Oxford. Whilst at school he came to the notice of Dean Savage (of Lichfield Cathedral) and possibly also of Sir William Henry Harris (one-time Assistant Organist at Lichfield Cathedral and latterly organist at St George's Chapel, Windsor Castle), who remained a personal friend until his death. Both may have influenced his later academic career at Oxford.

After graduating, Hunt taught at Durham School before moving to Oxford. He became a Tutor, Fellow and, latterly, Emeritus Fellow, at St Edmund Hall, Oxford between 1927 and 1944, Professor of French Literature and Language at Royal Holloway, University of London between 1944 and 1964, and Senior Fellow of Warwick University between 1966 and 1970.

Hunt was known for his work on Balzac. He published several books on literature and thought in nineteenth-century France. He was also the author of a biography of Honoré de Balzac, and a comprehensive study of Balzac's writings: Balzac's 'Comédie Humaine' (1959). His translation of Balzac's Cousin Pons appeared in Penguin Classics in 1968.

On 28 December 1925, he married Sheila Jessamine Spielman, daughter of Franz Josef Spielman. The wedding took place in Paris, but was not attended by his father. He had five children, including Sir Peter Hunt FRICS.

Hunt died on 2 November 1973 in Tredington, Warwickshire.
