= 2004 Special Honours =

British government recognitions

As part of the British honours system, the Special Honours are issued at the King's pleasure at any given time. The Special Honours confer the award of the Order of the Garter, Order of the Thistle, Order of Merit, Royal Victorian Order and the Order of St John. Life Peers are at times also awarded as special honours.

== Life Peer ==
=== Baronesses ===
- Jane Bonham Carter, Member, Advisory Board, Centre for Reform and Member, Advisory Board for Britain and Europe.
- Nicola Jane Chapman, chair, Leeds United Disabled Organisation.
- Dr. Frances Gertrude Claire D’Souza, C.M.G., lately executive director, International Centre Against Censorship.
- Kishwer Falkner, Chief Executive, Students Partnership Worldwide.
- Dr. Ruth Beatrice Henig, C.B.E., J.P., D.L., formerly Senior Lecturer, Lancaster University.
- Margaret Josephine McDonagh, formerly General Secretary of the Labour Party.
- Delyth Jane Morgan, Chief Executive, Breakthrough Breast Cancer.
- Patricia Morris, OBE, Vice Chairman, Conservative Party.
- Professor Elaine Murphy, chairman, North East London Strategic Health Authority.
- Rabbi Dame Julia Babette Sarah Neuberger, DBE, Writer and Broadcaster.
- Margaret Theresa Prosser, OBE, Chair of Women's National Commission and formerly Deputy General Secretary of the Transport and General Workers Union.
- Janet Anne Royall, Head of the European Commission Office in Wales.
- Margaret Mary Wall, formerly National Secretary and Head of Policy, AMICUS.
- Professor Lola Young, OBE, lately Head of Culture, Greater London Authority.

=== Barons ===
- Sir David Alliance, CBE, Chairman, N. Brown Group.
- Professor Sir Sushantha Kumar Bhattacharyya, CBE, Professor of Manufacturing and Director, Warwick Manufacturing Group, University of Warwick.
- Professor Sir Alec Nigel Broers, President of the Royal Academy of Engineering.
- The Right Honourable Sir Simon Denis Brown, on his appointment as a Lord of Appeal in Ordinary.
- Sir Ewen James Hanning Cameron, DL, lately Chairman, Countryside Agency.
- The Right Honourable Sir Robert Douglas Carswell, on his appointment as a Lord of Appeal in Ordinary.
- Patrick Robert Carter, Chair, Sport England and author of recent report on offenders.
- Paul Rudd Drayson, Co-Founder, PowderJect Pharmaceuticals plc.
- Hugh John Maxwell Dykes, Associate Member, Quilter, Hilton, Goodison Stockbrokers.
- Air Marshal Sir Timothy Garden, KCB, Writer and Broadcaster.
- The Right Honourable Sir Edward Alan John George, GBE, formerly Governor, Bank of England.
- Professor Anthony Giddens, formerly Director of the London School of Economics and Political Science.
- Philip Gould, Chairman, Philip Gould Associates.
- The Reverend Dr. Leslie John Griffiths, Superintendent Minister, Wesley's Chapel, London.
- Garry Richard Rushby Hart, Special Adviser to the Secretary of State for Constitutional Affairs.
- Dr. Edward Haughey, OBE, JP, Chairman, Norbrook Laboratories Ltd.
- Alan Robert Haworth, Secretary to the Parliamentary Labour Party.
- Councillor Greville Patrick Charles Howard, Chairman, Wicksteed Leisure Ltd.
- Sir Harold Stanley Kalms, President, Dixons Groups plc.
- Sir John Olav Kerr, GCMG, formerly Secretary-General, European Convention.
- Irvine Alan Stewart Laidlaw, Chairman, Institute for International Research.
- Alexander Park Leitch, Chairman, National Employment Panel and formerly Chief Executive, Zurich Financial Services (UKISA Asia Pacific) Ltd.
- William David McKenzie, formerly Partner, Pricewaterhouse, Accountants.
- John Alston Maxton, formerly Labour Member of Parliament for Glasgow Cathcart.
- Dr. Diljit Singh Rana, MBE, Founder, Andras House Ltd, and First Honorary Indian Consul in Northern Ireland.
- The Reverend John Roger Roberts, formerly Methodist Minister for Wales.
- Richard Andrew Rosser, JP, General Secretary, Transport Salaried Staffs’ Association.
- Edward Rowlands, CBE, formerly Labour Member of Parliament for Merthyr Tydfil and Rhymney.
- Peter Charles Snape, formerly Labour Member of Parliament for West Bromwich East.
- Leonard Steinberg, Founder, Stanley Leisure plc. Former Deputy Treasurer, Conservative Party.
- David Maxim Triesman, on his appointment as a Lord in Waiting.
- Dr. Peter Derek Truscott, formerly Labour Member of the European Parliament for Hertfordshire.
- Denis Tunnicliffe, CBE, Chairman, UKAEA and of Rail Safety and Standards Board.
- Sir Iain David Thomas Vallance, Vice-Chairman, Royal Bank of Scotland.
- Sir Anthony Ian Young, formerly Senior Deputy General Secretary, Communication Workers’ Union.

== Most Excellent Order of the British Empire ==
Ribbon bar of the Order of the British Empire (Civil)

=== Member of the Order of the British Empire (MBE) ===
==== Civil Division ====
- Bert Trautmann – for services to Anglo-German relations.
- Gianfranco Zola.
