= James Essinger =

British writer (born 1957)

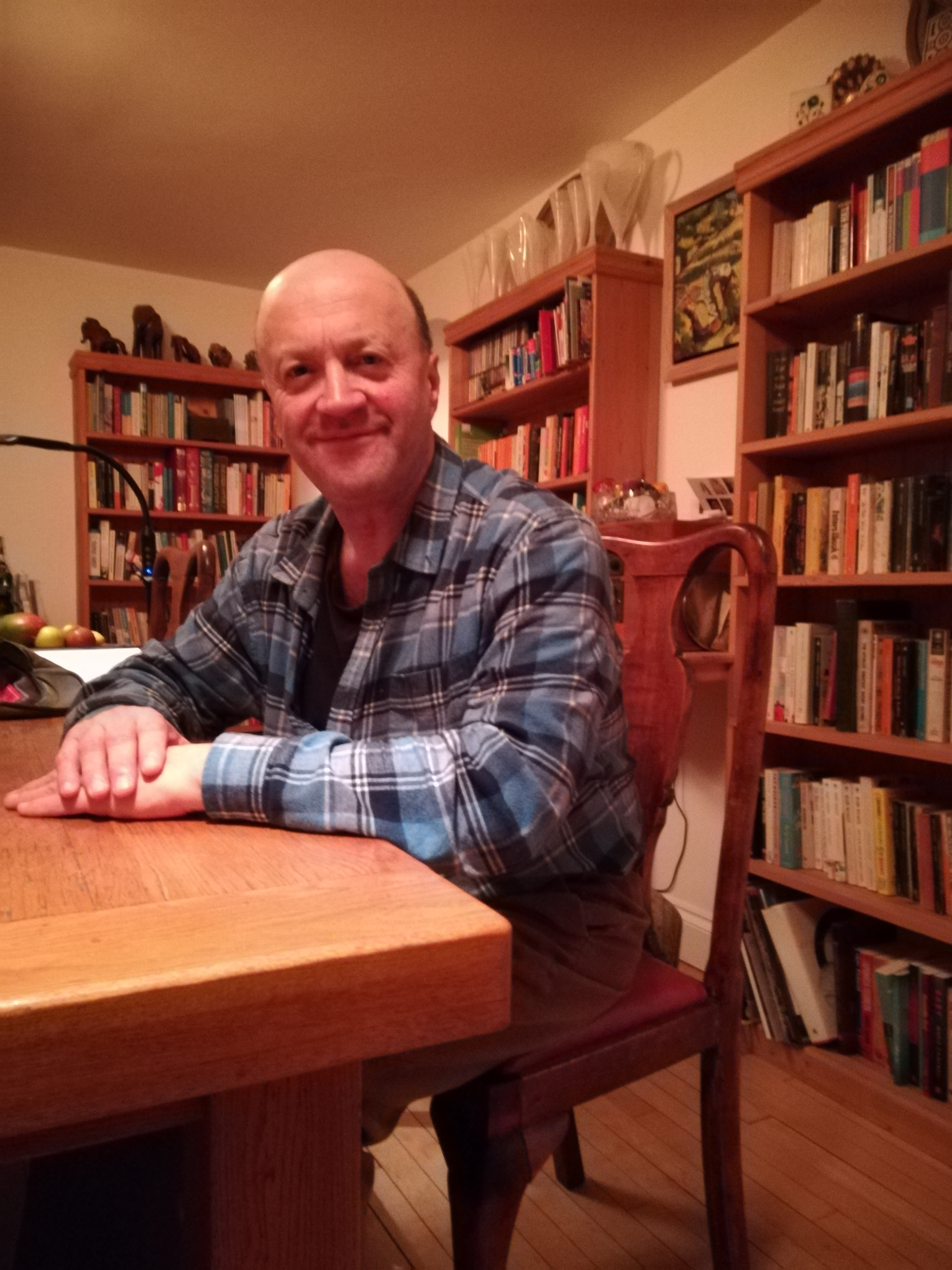
- James Essinger - March 2020
- Born: James Julius Essinger; 5 September 1957 (age 69); Leicester
- Education: Oxford University, Lincoln College
- Occupation: Writer
- Writing career
- Language: English
- Notable works: Jacquard's Web; Spellbound: The surprising origins and astonishing secrets of English spelling

James Essinger (born 5 September 1957) is a freelance writer and British author of numerous financial and business management books, but he is better known for his non-fiction books. These include Spellbound: The Improbable Story of English Spelling and his popular science book on the history of computing, Jacquard's Web. Essinger is also the author, with Jovanka Houska, of The Mating Game, a novel set in the world of chess.

== Biography ==
Born in Leicester (5 September 1957), Essinger was educated at Wyggeston Grammar School for Boys, Leicester, and at Lincoln College, Oxford, where he obtained an MA in English Language and Literature. Although a competition-level chess player, Essinger chose to focus on his academic career rather than entering the world of professional chess. After university, Essinger went to Finland where he taught English and became fluent in Finnish.

Since 1984, Essinger has been a freelance reporter and has authored books, articles and other publications.

In December 2015, Essinger founded 'The Conrad Press', a publishing firm in Canterbury, publishing the first fiction works by various authors, including Peter Taylor-Gooby, and local historian Paul Crampton. The Conrad Press now has more than 400 books in print or in production.

== Publications ==
Essinger's writing began in finance, management and IT, but more recently focuses on historical books.

=== Finance, IT and management (selection) ===
- Essinger, James (1991). Global custody (1st ed.). London: Longman. ISBN 978-0851218212.
- Essinger, James (1994). Starting a high-income consultancy. Corby: Institute of Management Foundation. ISBN 978-0273605065.
- Essinger, James; Wylie, Helen (1999). The seven deadly skills of competing. London: International Thomson Business Press. ISBN 978-1861523747.
- Essinger, James (1999). Writing marketing copy to get results (2nd ed.). London: International Thomson Business. ISBN 978-1861525192.
- Essinger, James (1999). The virtual banking revolution (1 ed., Reprint. ed.). London: Internat. Thomson Business Press. ISBN 978-1861523433.
- Dembitz, Alex; Essinger, James (2000). Breakthrough consulting : so you want to be a consultant? Turn your expertise into a successful consulting business. London: Financial Times Prentice Hall. ISBN 9780273637073.

=== History of computing ===
His book, Jacquard's Web, develops from his involvement writing a computer history book about Charles Babbage, The Cogwheel Brain, with Dr. Doron Swade . His own research starts earlier and covers the role of Jacquard's Loom cards (the idea which Babbage used for his first 'computers', the Difference Engine and the Analytical Engine), which were the precursors of the first programming languages, a significance recognised by Babbage's friend, Ada Lovelace.

Jacquard's Web (2004) was named one of The Economist's Best Science and Technology Books of 2004 and one of the best books in Science and Technology for 2004 by Entertainment Weekly.

Essinger continues this interest in his biography of Ada Lovelace, A Female Genius: How Ada Lovelace Started the Computer Age (2013) This book was published in the United States under the title Ada's Algorithm (2014). In 2019 Essinger published a book about the friendship between Charles Babbage and Ada Lovelace, Charles and Ada: the computer's most passionate partnership.

A movie option has been bought to Ada's Algorithm by Monumental Productions

Essinger has also written the libretto and most of the lyrics for a new two-act musical about Ada Lovelace: Ada's Algorithm, the Ada Lovelace musical.

=== History of spelling ===
Spellbound: the true story of man's greatest invention (2005) explores the English language and how it has developed through the ages to the quirkiness of today. Essinger covers topics from the extended meanings of ancient Egyptian hieroglyphics, King Alfred the Great's promotion of Anglo Saxon English to influences on our contemporary language. He discusses how English is a mongrel mix of languages from as diverse sources as Cornish, Finnish and Inuit, and how it shapes the English people.
