= Richard George (manufacturer) =

British food manufacturer (1944 - 2016)

- Born: 24 April 1944
- Died: 23 March 2016 (aged 71)

Sir Richard William George (24 April 1944 – 23 March 2016) was a British food manufacturer who turned the Weetabix company into a major British brand.

He was knighted in 1995 for his services to the food industry.
