= Michael Wakeford =

Sir Geoffrey Michael Montgomery Wakeford OBE (born 10 December 1937) is a retired English barrister and the Clerk of the Worshipful Company of Mercers for 27 years.

== Career ==
In addition to being a barrister and Clerk to the Mercers he has been a governor of the London Film School since 1985.

The Worshipful Company of Mercers is London's premier livery company, with easily the largest property portfolio, and Wakeford was much involved in property development.

In 1984, he was knighted in the Queen's birthday honours, "for services to education".

He was on the governing body of Abingdon School from 2000-2008.
