= Ruth Henig, Baroness Henig =

British historian and politician (1943–2024)

The Right Honourable The Baroness Henig CBE JP DL
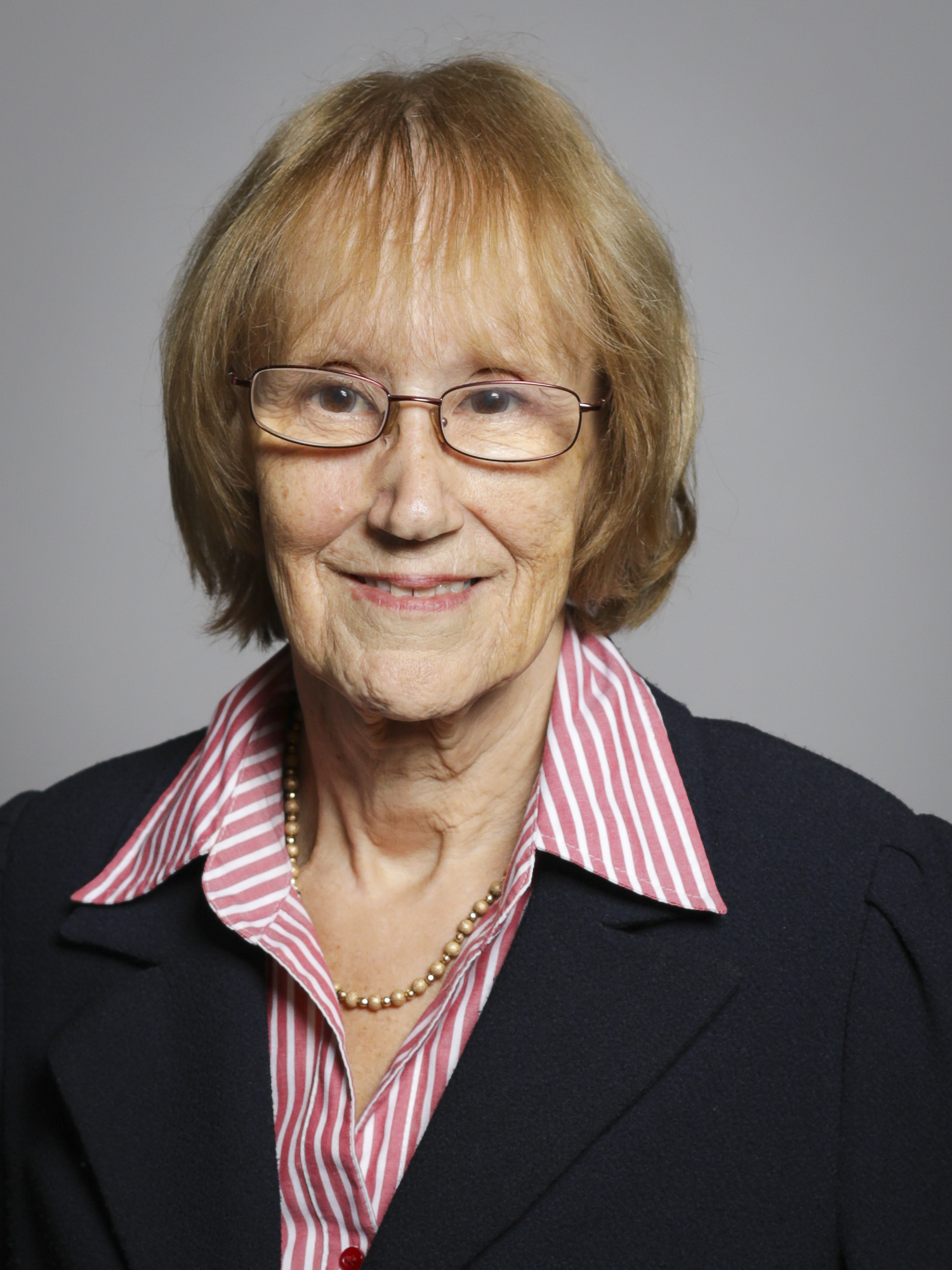
- Official portrait, 2019

Deputy Speaker of the House of Lords
- In office 5 March 2018 – 29 February 2024

Member of the House of Lords
- Lord Temporal
- Life peerage 8 June 2004 – 29 February 2024

Personal details
- Born: Ruth Beatrice Munzer; 10 November 1943 Leicester, England
- Died: 29 February 2024 (aged 80)
- Party: Labour
- Spouses: Stanley Henig (m. 1966; div. 1993) Jack Johnstone (m. 1994; died 2013)
- Children: 2, including Simon
- Education: Wyggeston Girls Grammar School; University of London; Lancaster University
- Occupation: Historian; politician

Ruth Beatrice Henig, Baroness Henig, CBE, JP, DL (née Munzer; 10 November 1943 – 29 February 2024) was a British academic historian and Labour politician.

== Family ==
Ruth Beatrice Munzer was born on 10 November 1943 to Kurt and Elfrieda Munzer, who were Jewish refugees who came to the United Kingdom from the Netherlands in 1940. Henig was married in 1966 to fellow academic Stanley Henig, who shortly afterward became a Labour member of Parliament. They had two children and divorced in 1993. Their son, Simon Henig, is the former leader of the Durham County Council, former chair of the North East Combined Authority, and a lecturer in politics at Sunderland University. She remarried in 1994 to Jack Johnstone.

== Academic career ==
Henig was educated at Wyggeston Girls Grammar School in Leicester, and at Bedford College, London, where she graduated in 1965 with a B.A. in history. She was awarded a PhD in history from Lancaster University in 1978, where she was a lecturer in Modern European History.

Henig served as Dean of the Faculty of Arts and Humanities from 1997 to 2000, and in April 2006, she was one of six people to receive the first Honorary Fellowships of Lancaster University.

=== Selected works ===
Henig wrote several books and pamphlets on 20th-century international history, including:

- Versailles and After, 1919−1933 (Lancaster Pamphlets, 1990)
- The Origins of the Second World War, 1933−1941 (Lancaster Pamphlets, 1990)
- The Origins of the First World War (Lancaster Pamphlets, 2001)
- The League of Nations: The Makers of the Modern World (Haus Publishing, 2010)
- The Weimar Republic, 1919−1933 (Lancaster Pamphlets, 2015)
- The Peace That Never Was: A History of the League of Nations (Haus Publishing, 2019)

== Political career ==
Henig was a Labour member of Lancashire County Council from 1981 to 2005, serving as the Council's chair from 1999 to 2000. She was also Chair of Lancashire Police Authority from 1995 to 2005 and chair of the Association of Police Authorities from 1997 to 2005, when she became the Association's president. She was also a member of the National Criminal Justice Board from 2003 to 2005. For many years she was a magistrate and a school governor.

At the 1992 general election, she stood as Labour candidate for her husband's former parliamentary seat of Lancaster. She failed to unseat the sitting Conservative MP Elaine Kellett-Bowman, but reduced the Conservative majority to just under 3,000, down from 6,500 in 1987.

Henig was appointed a Commander of the Order of the British Empire (CBE) in the 2000 Birthday Honours for services to the police, and in 2002 was appointed a Deputy lieutenant (DL) for Lancashire.

Henig was made a life peer on 8 June 2004 as Baroness Henig, of Lancaster in the County of Lancashire. She became a deputy speaker of the House of Lords in 2018.

In June 2013 Henig was awarded The Association of Security Consultant's Award, part of the Imbert Prize named after the former commissioner of the Metropolitan Police and the Lord Lieutenant of Greater London. In an industry first, the prize, awarded to the person making the most notable contribution to the security industry in the preceding year was shared with Don Randall, the head of security to the Bank of England. It was judged that Baroness Henig's contributions to the industry as Chair of the Security Industry Authority in overseeing the regulatory overhaul and building of a new and modern, fit-for-purpose regulatory regime made her an outstanding candidate.

On 20 December 2006, John Reid, the home secretary, appointed Henig as Chairman of the Security Industry Authority (SIA), a non-departmental public body tasked with the regulation of the private security industry. Having stepped down as chair from the SIA after six years in March 2013, Henig continued to work towards building a unified voice for the industry having just been appointed president of The Security Institute in April 2016. She was non-executive chairman with UK firm SecuriGroup and, as of March 2019, the chairman of the Register of Chartered Security Professionals.

== Interests ==
Henig's main leisure activity was playing bridge. She played for Lancashire since the early 1990s, and was the captain of the House of Lords team. Henig was also a keen football fan, supporting Leicester City FC for over 60 years.

== Death ==
Henig died on 29 February 2024, at the age of 80.
