= Regent College, Leicester =

Sixth form college in Leicester, England

Coordinates: 52.6257°N 1.1253°W

- Leicester; England

Information
- Former name: Wyggeston Collegiate Sixth Form College
- School type: Sixth form college
- Established: 1976
- Closed: 2018 (merged with Wyggeston and Queen Elizabeth I College

Regent College was a sixth form college in Leicester, England. The college was formed in 1976 as the Wyggeston Collegiate Sixth Form College and was renamed Regent College in 1996. It was merged into the nearby Wyggeston and Queen Elizabeth I College in 2018. It was originally The Wyggeston Grammar School for Girls, for many years before it was a Sixth Form College. It was selective on the basis of academic ability. The girls all had to pass an entrance exam.

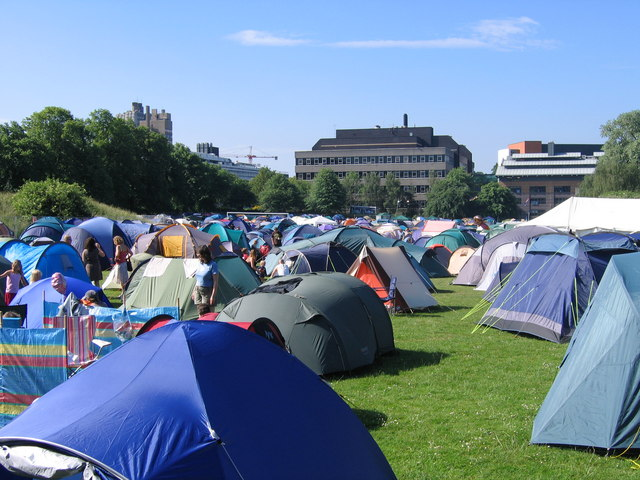
Regent College playing fields, providing camping space for festival goers attending the Big Session, an annual folk festival held at the nearby De Montfort Hall

== History ==
=== Wyggeston Girls' Grammar School ===
Ruth Railton was a music teacher, and came up for the idea of the National Youth Orchestra of Great Britain in the mid-1940s.

== Alumni ==
=== Wyggeston Girls' Grammar School ===
- Biddy Baxter MBE, creator of Blue Peter (1944–51)
- Fiona Chesterton, Editor from 1987 to 1989 of BBC London Plus, and from 1989 to 1991 of BBC Newsroom South East, Controller of Adult Learning from 1998 to 2003 at the BBC (1963–70)
- Joanna David née Hacking, actress, married since 2004 to Edward Fox (actor), and mother of Emilia Fox and Freddie Fox
- Enid Essame, Headmistress from 1943 to 1971 of Queenswood School (1918–23)
- Elaine Feinstein née Cooklin, poet and novelist (1942–49)
- Wendy Gifford, RSC and television actress, who married actor John Cater in 1963
- Ruth Henig, Baroness Henig née Munzer, chairman from 2007 to 2013 of the Security Industry Authority (1955–62)
- Faith Jaques, illustrated Roald Dahl books, designed the Royal Mail 1978 Christmas stamps
- Helen Koppell, Olympic diver in the 1970s, moved to Canada as an anaesthetist
- Dinah Nichols CB, chair from 2012 to 2016 of Keep Britain Tidy
- Dinah Prentice
- Cicely Ridley née Taylor, mathematician
- Prof Bhupinder Sandhu OBE FRCP FRCPCH, consultant paediatric gastroenterologist, Head of the Gastroenterology Unit since 1988 at the Bristol Royal Hospital for Children (-1969)
- Mary Scholes (Haggart) OBE, Chief Area Nursing Officer from 1973 to 1983 of Tayside Health Board, chairman from 1980 to 1984 of the Scottish National Board for Nursing, Midwifery and Health Visiting (since 2002, part of the Nursing and Midwifery Council) (1935–40)
- Mary Stott née Waddington, Guardian journalist and feminist (1918–25)
- Linda Stratmann, true crime writer (1959–1964)

== Former teachers ==
- Ruth Bird, historian
- Clara Collet, acquaintance of Karl Marx and social reformer for women's working conditions (taught from 1878 to 1885)
- Jamie Gambin, mathematics
- Robert Purdy MBE Art & Design
