= Peter John Hunt =

Sir Peter Hunt
- Born: 1 July 1933; Reading, Berkshire, England
- Died: 8 December 1997 (aged 64); Reading, Berkshire, England
- Occupations: chairman and managing director of Land Securities

Sir Peter John Hunt FRICS (1 July 1933 – 8 December 1997) was a British business magnate who became chairman and managing director of Land Securities, the largest commercial property company in the United Kingdom and the leading British property development and investment company headquartered in central London.

== Biography ==
The son of Professor Herbert Hunt, Peter Hunt was born on 1 July 1933, and educated at Bedford School. He joined Land Securities in 1964, becoming managing director of the company in 1978 and chairman in 1987. He remained in both roles until his death.

Hunt became a member of the Covent Garden Market Authority in 1975, and was a moving force in the regeneration of Covent Garden in the 1970s and 1980s. During the 1990s, in the face of a prolonged property price slump, he launched a £400 million property development programme, adding ten per cent to the portfolio of retail and office property owned by Land Securities.

Sir Peter Hunt died on 8 December 1997.
