= Dinah Nichols =

British civil servant and public administrator

Dinah Nichols CB
- Born: 1943 (age 82–83)
- Education: Bedford College, London
- Occupations: Civil servant, public administrator
- Known for: Director General for Environment, DEFRA; UK delegation leader to Kyoto and Johannesburg summits; Chair of Keep Britain Tidy
- Awards: Companion of the Order of the Bath

Dinah Nichols CB (born 1943) is a retired British civil servant and public administrator. She is known for her 35-year career in the UK Civil Service, including senior roles in the Department for Environment, Food and Rural Affairs (DEFRA), leading the UK delegation to the Kyoto Climate Conference and the World Summit on Sustainable Development, and as Chair of Keep Britain Tidy.

== Early life and education ==
Nichols studied history at Bedford College, London from 1962 to 1965, becoming the first in her family to attend university. She was awarded the Reid Arts Scholarship as an undergraduate, sang in the Imperial College Choir, performed with the ULU Gilbert and Sullivan Society, and served as Treasurer of the Students’ Union.

== Civil Service career ==
After graduating, Nichols joined the Ministry of Transport as a fast stream entrant, at a time when the Civil Service was predominantly male. Over a 35-year career, she held 20 different posts across five government departments. Her roles included involvement in the first attempt at devolution, inner city regeneration following the 1981 riots, serving as Private Secretary to both Labour and Conservative Transport Ministers, and overseeing the government’s property estate.

In her final full-time post as Director General for Environment at DEFRA, Nichols headed the UK delegation to the Kyoto Climate Change Conference and the World Summit on Sustainable Development.

== Later career ==
After leaving the Civil Service, Nichols held a variety of appointments in the private, public and charitable sectors. She served as a Crown Estate Commissioner, a non-executive director of Pennon Group, Chair of the National Forest Company, and Chair of Keep Britain Tidy. She is also a governor of Plymouth University.

== Honours and recognition ==
Nichols was appointed a Companion of the Order of the Bath (CB). She is an Honorary Fellow of Royal Holloway, University of London.

She funds the annual Dinah and Jessica Nichols Scholarship for postgraduate study in History at Royal Holloway, in memory of her sister, who also studied at Bedford College.
