= William Palmer =

William Palmer may refer to:

== Politics ==
- William A. Palmer (1781–1860), American politician
- William D. Palmer (born 1935), American politician in Iowa
- William Palmer (New Hampshire politician), member of the New Hampshire House of Representatives
- William Palmer (Irish politician), Chief Secretary for Ireland 1696–97
- William Palmer, 2nd Earl of Selborne (1859–1942), British politician
- William Palmer (Bridgnorth MP) for Bridgnorth
- William Palmer (Malmesbury MP) for Malmesbury
- William le Palmer, MP for Leicester
- William Palmer (Leicester MP) represented Leicester (UK Parliament constituency)

== Religion ==
- William Palmer (theologian, born 1803) (1803–1885), Anglican theologian and liturgical scholar
- William Palmer (theologian, born 1811) (1811–1879), English theologian, antiquarian and ecumenist
- William Palmer (dean of Johannesburg) (1881–1953), Anglican priest

== Sports ==
- Will Palmer (cricketer)) (William Palmer, 1737–1790), English cricketer
- William Palmer (cricketer, born 1847) (1847–1906), English cricketer
- William Palmer (athlete) (1882–1967), British Olympic athlete
- Billy Palmer (baseball), Major League Baseball pitcher, 1885
- Billy Palmer (1887–1955), English footballer
- William Palmer (soccer), American soccer player in the National Soccer Hall of Fame
- Will Palmer (William Palmer, born 1997), British racing driver

== Other ==
- William Palmer (barrister) (1802–1858), English legal writer and Gresham Professor of Law
- William Palmer (murderer) (1824–1856), doctor and multiple murderer
- William Isaac Palmer (1824–1893), English businessman
- William Jackson Palmer (1836–1909), American industrialist and general
- William Henry Palmer (1835–1926), American soldier
- William C. Palmer (1906–1987), American painter
- William Palmer (novelist) (born 1943), professor of English and author
- William Devereux Palmer, engineer
- William Palmer (sculptor), English sculptor and builder
- William Palmer, founder of Palmer's College in Thurrock
- William Palmer, title character of the BBC Radio 4 drama series Pilgrim

== See also ==
- Bill Palmer (disambiguation)
- Willard Palmer (1917–1996), American musician and composer
