= Richard Clerk =

Richard Clerk may refer to:

- Richard Clerk (bishop), bishop in England and Ireland
- Richard Clerk (MP), English Member of Parliament

== See also ==
- Richard le Clerk, Gloucester MP
- Richard Clerke (disambiguation)
- Richard Clarke (disambiguation)
- Richard Clark (disambiguation)
