= Henry Carleton =

Henry Carleton may refer to:

- Henry Carleton (judge) (c.1785–1863), American judge in Louisiana
- Henry de Carleton (fl. 1306), English member of parliament
- Henry Alexander Carleton (1814–1900), British Army officer
- Henry Guy Carleton (1851–1910), American humorist, playwright, and journalist

== See also ==
- Henry H. Carlton (1835–1905), American politician, medical doctor, journalist and soldier
