= Bill Palmer =

Bill Palmer may refer to:

- Willard A. Palmer (1917–1996), American musician and composer, nicknamed Bill
- Bill Palmer (swim coach) (1938–2020), American swim coach
- Bill Palmer, writer of the political website Palmer Report

== See also ==
- Billy Palmer (1887–1955), British association footballer
- Billy Palmer (baseball) (fl. 1885), English-born American Major League Baseball pitcher
- Will Palmer, born 1997, a British Motor racing driver
- William Palmer (disambiguation)
