= John Tonge =

John Tonge may refer to:

- John Tonge (cricketer) (1865–1903), English cricketer
- John Tonge (MP), MP for Leicester in 1407

== See also ==
- John Tonge Centre, mortuary in Queensland, Australia
