= John Biggs (MP) =

British hosier and Liberal and Radical politician

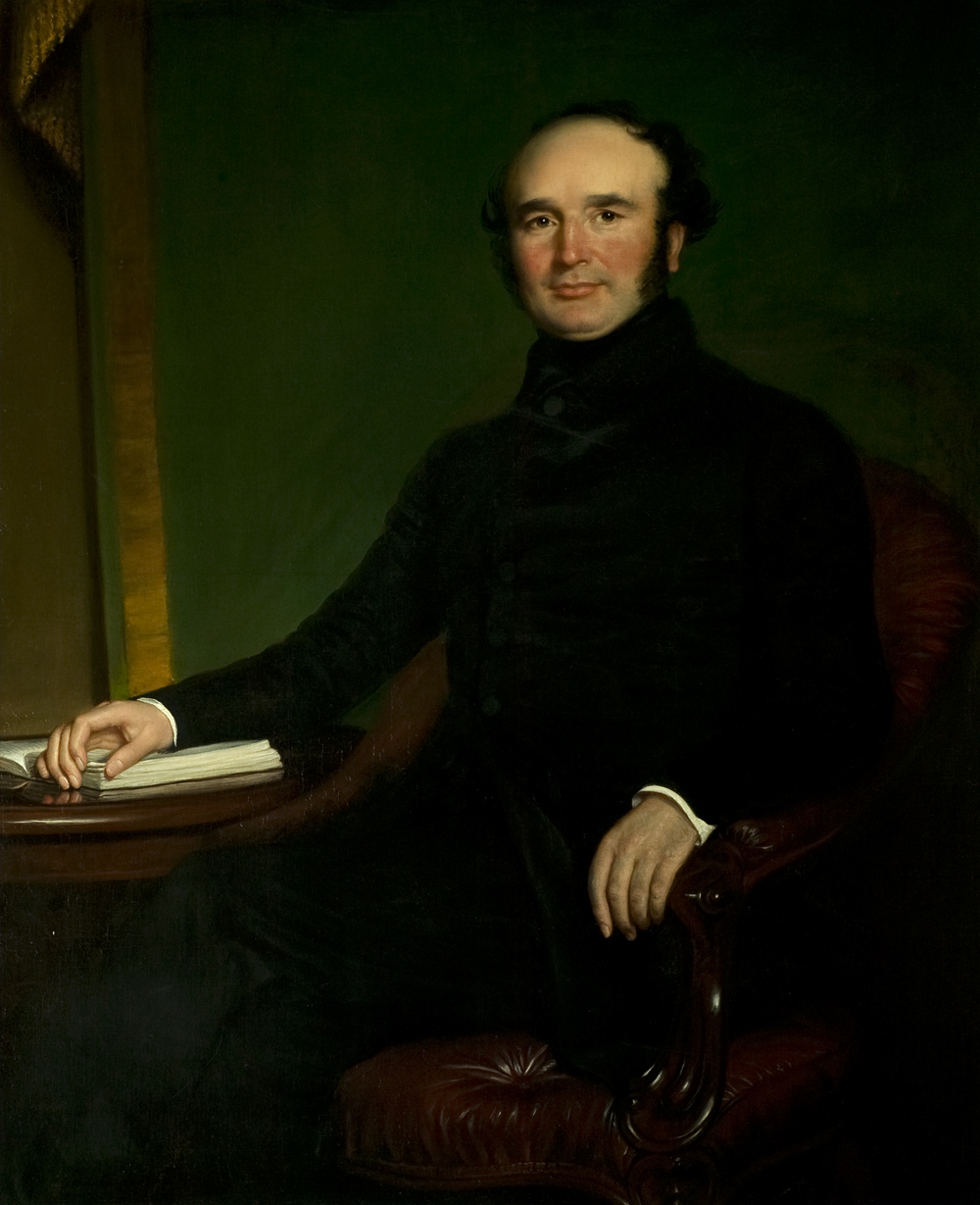
- Biggs as painted by an unknown artist

Member of Parliament for Leicester
- In office 18 June 1856 – 17 February 1862 Serving with William Unwin Heygate (1861–1862); Joseph William Noble (1859–1861); John Dove Harris (1857–1859); Joshua Walmsley (1856–1857)
- Preceded by: Joshua Walmsley; Richard Gardner
- Succeeded by: William Unwin Heygate; Peter Alfred Taylor

Personal details
- Born: 11 April 1801 Leicester
- Died: 4 June 1871 (aged 70)
- Resting place: Welford Road Cemetery, Leicester
- Party: Liberal
- Other political affiliations: Radical
- Parent(s): John Biggs; Elizabeth Heggs

John Biggs (11 April 1801 – 4 June 1871) was a British hosier and Liberal and Radical politician.

== Early life and business ==
Biggs was born in Leicester, the oldest of the seven children of John Biggs (1774–1827) and his wife Elizabeth Heggs (1780–1862). John Biggs the elder had come to the town from Withybrook in Warwickshire at the end of the eighteenth century and set up a small hosiery business. Young John and his three brothers, Thomas, William and Joseph, joined the business and built it up to such an extent that, by the time of their father's death in 1827, John Biggs and Sons was one of the largest firms in Leicester, with exports to North America and Australia. In Biggs's hands, the business innovated in hosiery and glovemaking, and invested heavily in equipping a steam-powered factory. Another Leicester hosier Thomas Corah had already made his factory entirely steam driven and was under selling the Biggs brothers.

== Political career ==
=== Reformer ===
Biggs engaged in campaigning for political reform early into his life, helping found the Political Union and Reform Society in 1826, and supporting the anti-Corn Laws campaign. By 1846, he and a fellow hosier were named as 'the Cobden and Bright of the Midland Counties', referring to Radical leaders Richard Cobden and John Bright.

His reform views led him to become one of the leaders of the reformed corporation of Leicester, and he was made mayor in 1840, 1847 and 1856, while also a borough magistrate from 1849. Yet, his views were rejected while he was in office, with "modest proposals" for street-widening and a town hall dismissed by the Improvement committee in 1845.

In 1849 he became the first president of the Leicester Freehold Land Society whose aim was to make money from the purchase of land and the building of houses or selling it for building. Another aim was to gain its members a vote in county elections by giving them an income valued at forty shillings a year, thereby, in the words of Biggs in the inaugural meeting, "overthrowing the Tory domination in the county." In this latter aim the Society probably had limited success.

Becoming disillusioned with the Reform Society and local MPs Joshua Walmsley and Richard Gardner, Biggs turned "ultra-radical" and sought to return what he believed truly radical MPs for Leicester and a popular franchise. Eventually, this led to Walmsley and Gardner being unseated and replaced by John Ellis and Richard Harris, causing a 15-year battle between local Liberal factions.

=== Member of Parliament ===
Biggs was elected Radical MP for Leicester at a by-election in 1856—caused by the death of Richard Gardner—and became known as the 'Dictator' of a 'Chartist clique' by local opponents.

Biggs held the seat until 1863, when he recognised a union was needed between the warring Liberal factions—spurred by a Conservative victory by William Unwin Heygate at an 1861 by-election for the borough—and resigned from politics altogether.

== Later life ==
Following his departure from politics, Biggs fell foul of several other personal problems, starting with financial failure. After racking up debts of more than £10,000, his house had to be sold, along with paintings he owned, and his business was sold to another firm as a going concern.

Meanwhile, his sister died, and her husband James Francis Hollings—editor of the Leicestershire Mercury and historian and luminary of the Literary and Philosophical Society—committed suicide.

In 1871, living unmarried, Biggs too died, leaving behind little wealth but what some historians describe as a significant impact on the city. The town hall he had campaigned for during his earlier political life was approved and built, frame-rent was abolished, and the reunited Liberal party was "rescued... from their inertia".

Biggs was buried at Welford Road Cemetery.

== Memorials ==
After Biggs' death, his friends launched a public subscription to fund a simple plaque over his grave. Encouraged by the campaigning of local printer John Burton, the response was so great that the plan was changed to involve the erection of a statue in the town.

The result, a statue in Sicilian marble by George Anderson Lawson was unveiled in Welford Place on 15 April 1873. Unfortunately, it was damaged in a collision with a tram, and replaced by a bronze cast of the original in 1930. The statue was grade II listed on 14 March 1975.

P. L. Quinn suggests that the character of Augustus Debarry in George Eliot's novel Felix Holt, the Radical is based upon John Biggs.

Parliament of the United Kingdom
Preceded by Joshua Walmsley; Richard Gardner	Member of Parliament for Leicester; 1856–1862; With: Joshua Walmsley (1856–1857); John Dove Harris (1857–1859); Joseph William Noble (1859–1861); William Unwin Heygate (1861–1862)	Succeeded by William Unwin Heygate; Peter Alfred Taylor
