= 1906 Leicester by-election =

UK Parliamentary by-election

The 1906 Leicester by-election was held on 30 March 1906. The by-election was held due to the resignation of the incumbent Liberal MP, Henry Broadhurst. It was won by the Liberal candidate Franklin Thomasson.

Leicester by-election, 1906
Party	Candidate	Votes	%	±%
Liberal	Franklin Thomasson	10,766	59.9	+20.0
Conservative	John Rolleston	7,206	40.1	+19.8
Majority		3,560	19.8	+0.2
Turnout		17,972	71.5	−17.4
Liberal hold		Swing	+0.1	
