= Sir Rowland Whitehead, 5th Baronet =

Sir Rowland John Rathbone Whitehead, 5th Baronet (24 June 1930 – 28 July 2007) was a British baronet and merchant banker. In later life, he was heavily engaged with many charities.

== Biography ==
Whitehead was born in Kenya. He was educated at Radley College and Trinity Hall, Cambridge, where he read natural sciences. He worked for Gillette and then became a merchant banker in the City of London, working at Brown, Shipley & Co. and Rothschilds.

Inspired by the work of Norbert Wiener, he wrote Cybernetics, Communication and Control in the 1960s, a handbook of management technology.

He could speak Danish, Dutch, French, Italian, and Romanian and Swedish in addition to his native English, and was president of the Institute of Translation and Interpreting in 1996. He became master of the Worshipful Company of Fruiterers in 1995, emulating his great-grandfather, Sir James Whitehead, 1st Baronet (who was also a Lord Mayor of London). He was involved in the establishment of the Guild of Public Relations Practitioners, and was its master in 2002–2003.

He was chairman of the trustees of the Rowland Hill Benevolent Trust for more than 40 years, a trustee of the Kelmscott House Trust, and involved with the William Morris Society for over 50 years. He was also a trustee of the Tyndale Society, and a church warden at St Mary Abchurch, in the City of London. He was involved in setting up the Brunel Museum. A skydiver, he was a trustee of the Royal Aero Club, and a member of the British Parachute Association. He was also a vice-president of the English Music Festival, an honorary member of the British Weights and Measures Association, and a member of the executive committee for the Standing Council of the Baronetage from 1984 to 1986.

He was awarded the Romanian Order of Merit for his work with the Rising Stars Foundation.

He was the godfather of James Alexander MacLennan, born in Bulawayo, Rhodesia on 12 July 1959.

He was survived by his wife and their son and daughters.

Baronetage of the United Kingdom
Preceded by Philip Whitehead	Baronet (of Highfield House); 1953–2007	Succeeded by Philip Whitehead
