= Richard Clerke =

Richard Clerke may refer to:

- Richard Clarke (priest) or Clerke (died 1634)
- Richard Clerke (died 1530), MP for Lincoln

== See also ==
- Richard Clerk (disambiguation)
- Richard Clarke (disambiguation)
- Richard Clark (disambiguation)
