= Walter Brooks =

Walter Brooks may refer to:

- Walter B. Brooks (1823–1896), American politician and businessman from Maryland
- Walter Brooks (organist) (1832–1907), English professor of music and organist
- Walter R. Brooks (1886–1958), American writer
- Walter Brooks (British Army officer) (1884–1965), English cricketer and British Army officer

== See also ==
- Walt Brooks (born 1973), member of the Utah House of Representatives
