= Henry Beeby =

English politician (fl. 1380–1395)

Henry Beeby (fl. 1380–1395) was an English politician. He sat as MP for Leicester in 1391, 1394 and 1395.

He also served as Mayor of Leicester from Michaelmas 1385 till 1386, 1386 till 1387 and 1394 till 1395.
