= James Allanson Picton =

British independent minister and liberal politician (1832–1910)

- Born: 8 August 1832; Liverpool, Lancashire, England
- Died: 4 February 1910 (aged 77); Penmaenmawr, Wales
- Occupations: Independent minister, liberal politician
- Political party: Liberal

James Allanson Picton (8 August 1832 – 4 February 1910) was a British independent minister, author, philosopher and Liberal politician. Picton promoted a philosophy known as Christian pantheism.

== Life ==
Picton was born at Liverpool, the eldest son of Sir James Allanson Picton and his wife Sarah Pooley. His father was an architect and supporter of the Liverpool Free Library. He was educated at the High School, and at the Mechanics' Institute and joined his father's architectural practice at the age of 16. Three years later he decided to study for the ministry and joined the Lancashire Independent College and Owens College, Manchester. He achieved a first in classics and in 1855 was awarded MA at the University of London.

In spite of allegations of heresy, in 1856, he was appointed to Cheetham Hill congregational church at Manchester. There he gave a course of popular lectures to the working classes, but one of his sermons revived the allegation of heresy and in 1862 he went to Gallowtree Gate chapel, Leicester. In 1869 he became pastor of St. Thomas's Square chapel, Hackney where he upset orthodox members by delivering lectures on secular themes such as English history and the principles of radical and conservative politics on Sunday afternoons to the working classes. He remained at Hackney until 1879. He wrote much in the press and published many sermons, pamphlets, and volumes on religion and politics.

Picton started to take an active part in public life as an uncompromising radical. He represented Hackney on the London School Board from 1870 to 1879 and was chairman of the school management committee for three years. In 1883 he was chosen as a radical candidate for Tower Hamlets but in June 1884 he stood instead at a by-election for Leicester. He was elected Member of Parliament to succeed Peter Alfred Taylor, most of whose opinions he shared. He retained the seat in the following elections and resigned from the House of Commons in 1894. He was very small in stature, but possessing good oratorical powers, and retaining the manner of the pulpit, he always won the ear of the House of Commons, where he was known as a sincere advocate of extreme views.

After his retirement, Picton built Caerlyr Hall at Penmaenmawr, North Wales in about 1896 (the name Caerlyr means City of Leicester in Welsh). William Ewart Gladstone was said to have been a friend of Picton and visited the area frequently. Picton died at Caerlyr Hall aged 77.

Picton married firstly Margaret Beauont, daughter of John Beaumont of Manchester; and secondly Jessie Carr Williams, daughter of Sydney Williams a publisher. He had four sons.

== Pantheism ==
Picton was a disciple of Spinoza and authored Pantheism: Its Story and Significance, in 1905. Picton was a proponent of Christian pantheism which was termed "the religion of the universe". In his book The Mystery of Matter, Picton considered the universe as a manifestation of an infinite energy with the God of Christianity as substantially identical.

== Publications ==
From 1879 to 1884 he wrote leaders in the Weekly Dispatch, then an advanced radical organ, and contributed to the Christian World, The Theological Review, the Contemporary Review, Macmillan's Magazine, the Examiner, and other periodicals.

His books included :

- A Catechism of the Gospels, 1866.
- New Theories and the Old Faith, 1870
- The Mystery of Matter, 1873
- The Religion of Jesus, 1876
- Pulpit Discourses, 1879
- Oliver Cromwell: the Man and his Mission, 1882
- Lessons from the English Commonwealth, 1884
- The Conflict of Oligarchy and Democracy, 1885 James Allanson Picton The Conflict of Oligarchy and Democracy
- Sir James A. Picton: a Biography, 1891
- The Bible in School, 1901
- The Religion of the Universe, 1904
- Pantheism: Its Story and Significance, 1905
- Spinoza: A Handbook to the Ethics, 1907
- Man and the Bible, 1909

Parliament of the United Kingdom
Preceded by Alexander McArthur; Peter Alfred Taylor	Member of Parliament for Leicester; 1884–1894; With: Alexander McArthur 1884–1892; Sir James Whitehead 1892–1894	Succeeded by Henry Broadhurst; Walter Hazell
