= Whitehead baronets =

Baronetcy in the Baronetage of the United Kingdom

- Escutcheon of the Whitehead baronets of Highfield House, Berkshire
- Creation date: 1889
- Status: extant
- Motto: Virtute et labore, By pluck and work

Sir Rowland Whitehead, 3rd Baronet

The Whitehead baronetcy, of Highfield House in Catford Bridge in the County of Kent, is a title in the Baronetage of the United Kingdom. It was created on 26 November 1889 for James Whitehead, Lord Mayor of London for 1888/9 and later Member of Parliament for Leicester from 1892 to 1894.

His younger son, the 3rd Baronet, was also a Member of Parliament, for South East Essex from 1906 to 1910.

== Whitehead baronets of Highfield House, Berkshire (1889) ==
- Sir James Whitehead, 1st Baronet (1834–1917)
- Sir George Hugh Whitehead, 2nd Baronet (1861–1931)
- Sir Rowland Edward Whitehead, 3rd Baronet (1863–1942)
- Sir Philip Henry Rathbone Whitehead, 4th Baronet (1897–1953)
- Sir Rowland John Rathbone Whitehead, 5th Baronet (1930–2007)
- Sir Philip Henry Rathbone Whitehead, 6th Baronet (born 1957)

The heir apparent is the present holder's son Orlando James Rathbone Whitehead (born 1994).

== Notes ==
Baronetage of the United Kingdom
| Preceded by Burns baronets | Whitehead baronets of Highfield House; 26 November 1889 | Succeeded by Dillwyn-Llewelyn baronets |

}
