= Thomas Armeston =

English politician

Thomas Armeston (ca. 1606 – 1685) was an English politician who sat in the House of Commons in 1660.

Armeston was the son of Thomas Armeston (died 1640) of Burbage and his wife Anne Replingham, daughter of Edward Replingham of Warwickshire. He became an apothecary in London where he traded at the sign of the Grasshopper in Cheapside until he succeeded to the family estates on the death of his brother in 1651. He was commissioner for militia for Leicestershire from March 1660. In April 1660, he became a freeman of Leicester and was elected Member of Parliament for Leicester in the Convention Parliament. He was commissioner for assessment for Leicestershire from August 1660 to 1669. He was Sheriff of Leicestershire from 1662 to 1663.

Armeston died unmarried at the age of about 78 as his will was proved in May 1685.

Parliament of England
Preceded by Peter Temple	Member of Parliament for Leicester; 1660; With: John Grey	Succeeded by Sir William Hartopp; Sir John Pretyman, 1st Baronet
