= Ralph Skinner =

British priest and MP

Ralph Skinner was a sixteenth century Clergyman and member of parliament.

Skinner was educated at Winchester and New College, Oxford. Successively he sat as an MP for Leicester, Penryn, Bossiney and Westbury. As well as his representative duties he was Lay rector of Broughton Astley from 1550 to 1553; Pro-warden of New College, Oxford, from 1551 to 1553; Warden of Sherburn Hospital from 1559; Commissioner to enforce Acts of Uniformity and Supremacy for the Province of York from 1560; Chancellor, Receiver General and Dean of the Palatinate of Durham from 1561; and Rector of Sedgefield (where he was buried) from 1562.

Church of England titles
Parliament of England
Preceded by John Throckmorton; Edward Hastings	Member of Parliament for Leicester with George Swillington; 1547–1552	Succeeded by Robert Cotton; George Swillington
Preceded by John Johnson; Humphrey Corbet	Member of Parliament for Penryn with John Ayleworth; 1553 (2nd)	Succeeded by William Bendlowes _{Not known}
Preceded by Richard Forset; George Harrison	Member of Parliament for Bossiney; 1555; With: _{Not known}	Succeeded by Thomas Stanley; John Kempthorne (MP)
Preceded by John Buckland; William Allen Helyer	Member of Parliament for Westbury with Anthony Carleton; 1559	Succeeded by Hugh Ryley; John Dyster
Church of England titles
Preceded by Robert Horne	Dean of Durham; 1561–1563	Succeeded by William Whittingham
Academic offices
Preceded by Thomas Harding	Warden of New College, Oxford; 1551–1553	Succeeded by Thomas Whyte
