= Henry Broadhurst =

British politician (1840–1911)

Henry Broadhurst c. 1895

Henry Broadhurst, c. 1905

See also Harry Broadhurst

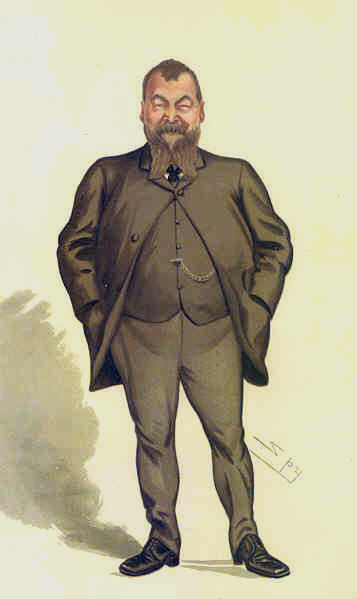
"the working-man Member" Broadhurst as caricatured by Spy (Leslie Ward) in Vanity Fair, August 1884

Henry Broadhurst (13 April 1840 – 11 October 1911) was a leading early British trade unionist and a Lib-Lab politician who sat in the House of Commons for various Midlands constituencies between 1880 and 1906.

Broadhurst was born in Littlemore, Oxford, the son of Thomas Broadhurst, a journeyman stonemason. He followed his father into stonemasonry at the age of thirteen and during the late 1850s spent a considerable period travelling the south of England, attempting to find work. In 1865, he moved to London and worked on the Clock Tower of the Palace of Westminster.

In 1872, Broadhurst was elected as the Chair of a Masons' Committee during an industrial dispute. After achieving a major victory, Broadhurst began working full-time for the Stonemasons Union. He also became the union's delegate to the Trades Union Congress (TUC) and was elected to its Parliamentary Committee. In 1873, he became the secretary of the Labour Representation League.

At the 1874 general election, two candidates sponsored by the League were elected, but Broadhurst was unsuccessful at High Wycombe. In 1875, he was elected Secretary of the Parliamentary Committee of the TUC, the post which was later to become the General Secretaryship.

At the 1880 general election, Broadhurst was elected as the Liberal–Labour Member of Parliament for Stoke-upon-Trent. Within the House of Commons, he pushed through legislation enabling working men to act as Justices of the Peace, and for all Government contracts to include a "fair wage" clause. In 1884, he was appointed to the Royal Commission on the housing of the working class.

In 1885 general election, Broadhurst moved to represent Birmingham Bordesley. He was appointed as Under-Secretary of State for the Home Department in the Liberal government, the first person from a working-class or labour movement background to hold a ministerial post. He was the first minister to be granted permission not to attend levees. Following his appointment, he resigned from his TUC post. William Ewart Gladstone attempted but failed to have his ministerial salary reduced.

For the 1886 general election, Broadhurst moved seats again, this time winning Nottingham West. Free of ministerial responsibilities, he was again elected Secretary of the Parliamentary Committee of the TUC, but became increasingly isolated as more left wing members, such as Keir Hardie, accused him of not sufficiently representing the interests of labour within Parliament. Following a defeat in a crucial vote at the 1890 TUC conference, and citing declining health, Broadhurst resigned the post.

In 1892, Broadhurst was appointed to a second Royal Commission, on the aged poor. He lost his seat at Nottingham West at the 1892 general election, and was also defeated at the 1893 Grimsby by-election. However, he returned to Parliament as MP for Leicester at the 1894 Leicester by-election, holding this seat as a Lib–Lab MP until 1906.

Following his retirement, Broadhurst moved to Norfolk, where he became an alderman. He died at the age of 71. He is buried in Overstrand.

Broadhurst married Eliza Olley, daughter of Edward Olley a journeyman currier at Norwich in 1859.

== Archives ==
- Catalogue of the Broadhurst papers at the Archives Division of the London School of Economics.

Trade union offices
Preceded by Robert Knight and W. H. Packwood	Auditor of the Trades Union Congress; 1873–1874; With: Peter Shorrocks (1873); Philip Casey (1874)	Succeeded by Brown and Shipton
Preceded by George Howell	Secretary of the Parliamentary Committee of the TUC; 1876–1885	Succeeded by George Shipton
Preceded by George Shipton	Secretary of the Parliamentary Committee of the TUC; 1886–1890	Succeeded by Charles Fenwick
Parliament of the United Kingdom
Preceded by Robert Heath; Edward Kenealy	Member of Parliament for Stoke-on-Trent; 1880–1885; With: William Woodall	Constituency abolished
New constituency	Member of Parliament for Birmingham Bordesley; 1885–1886	Succeeded by Jesse Collings
Preceded by Charles Seely	Member of Parliament for Nottingham West; 1886–1892	Succeeded by Charles Seely
Preceded by James Allanson Picton and James Whitehead	Member of Parliament for Leicester; 1894–1906; With: Walter Hazell to 1900; Sir John Rolleston 1900–1906; Ramsay MacDonald 1906	Succeeded by Franklin Thomasson and Ramsay MacDonald
Government offices
Preceded by Charles Stuart Wortley	Under-Secretary of State for the Home Department; 1886	Succeeded by Charles Stuart Wortley
Party political offices
Preceded by Lloyd Jones	Secretary of the Labour Representation League; 1873–1880	Succeeded by John Hales
