= Peter Temple (disambiguation) =

Peter Temple (1946–2018) was an Australian crime fiction writer. The name may also refer to:

- Peter Temple (regicide) (1599–1663), English Member of Parliament
- Sir Peter Temple, 2nd Baronet (1592–1653), English parliamentarian
