= Thomas Wakefield =

Thomas Wakefield may refer to:

- Thomas Wakefield (orientalist) (died 1575), or Wakefeld, orientalist
- Thomas Wakefield (politician), 14th and 15th century man of Leicester
