= John Dove Harris =

English Liberal politician

Member of Parliament for Leicester
- In office 1857–1859 Serving with John Biggs
- Preceded by: Joshua Walmsley; John Biggs
- Succeeded by: John Biggs; Joseph William Noble

Member of Parliament for Leicester
- In office 1865–1874 Serving with Peter Alfred Taylor
- Preceded by: William Unwin Heygate; Peter Alfred Taylor
- Succeeded by: Peter Alfred Taylor; Alexander McArthur

Personal details
- Born: 1809
- Died: 20 November 1878 (aged 68–69)
- Party: Liberal
- Spouse: Emma Shirley

John Dove Harris (1809 – 20 November 1878) was an English Liberal politician who sat in the House of Commons between 1857 and 1874.

Harris was the son of Richard Harris former MP for Leicester and his wife Fanny Dove, daughter of William Dove of Moulton, Northamptonshire. He was Mayor of Leicester in 1850 and in 1856. He was a deputy lieutenant and J.P. for Leicestershire, and a J.P. for Leicester.

In 1857 Harris was elected member of parliament for Leicester but lost the seat in 1859. He stood unsuccessfully in 1861 but was re-elected as MP for Leicester at the 1865 general election. He held the seat until 1874.

Harris died at the age of 69.

Harris married Emma Shirley, daughter of George Shirley of Tamworth in 1831.

Parliament of the United Kingdom
Preceded by Joshua Walmsley; John Biggs	Member of Parliament for Leicester; 1857 – 1859; With: John Biggs	Succeeded by John Biggs; Joseph William Noble
Preceded by William Unwin Heygate; Peter Alfred Taylor	Member of Parliament for Leicester; 1865 – 1874; With: Peter Alfred Taylor	Succeeded by Peter Alfred Taylor; Alexander McArthur
