= Edward Goulburn =

Edward Goulburn may refer to:

- Edward Meyrick Goulburn, English churchman
- Edward Goulburn (MP), British politician
