= Thomas Coke (MP for Leicester) =

English politician

Thomas Coke MP, JP PC
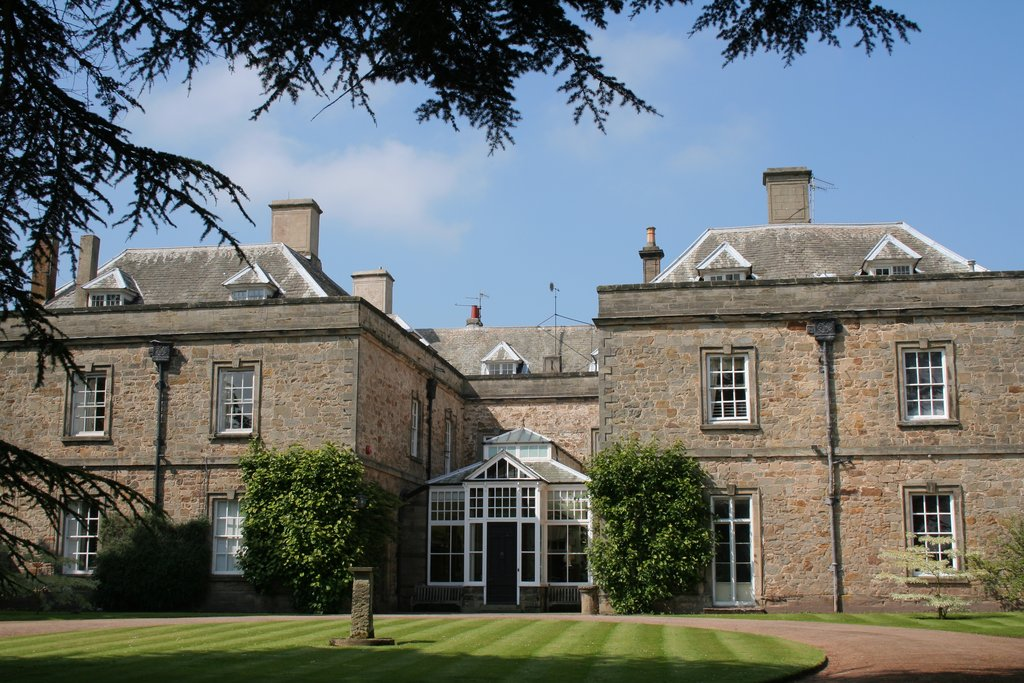
- Melbourne Hall, the Coke family home inherited by Thomas in 1650

Member of Parliament for Leicester
- In office November 1640 – January 1644 (suspended)

Personal details
- Born: 1610 Hall Court, Herefordshire
- Died: 23 August 1656 (aged 46) Tottenham, Middlesex
- Spouse: Mary Pope
- Children: John Coke
- Parent(s): Sir John Coke; Marie Powell
- Education: Gray's Inn
- Occupation: Politician

Thomas Coke (ca.1610 to 1656) was an English lawyer and politician elected member of parliament for Leicester in 1640. During the First English Civil War, he sat in the Royalist-controlled Oxford Parliament, leading to his suspension by the Westminster Parliament in January 1644.

== Career ==
Thomas Coke was born in 1610 at Hall Court in Herefordshire, the third son of Sir John Coke (1563–1644), Secretary of State to Charles I of England from 1625 to 1640, and his first wife Mary Powell, daughter of John Powell of Presteign in Herefordshire. His father served as Secretary of State to Charles I of England from 1625 to 1640. Coke attended Gray's Inn.

In April 1640, Coke was elected member of parliament for Leicester in the Short Parliament. He was re-elected MP for Leicester in November 1640 for the Long Parliament. When the First English Civil War began in August 1642, his elder brother John Coke remained in London and supported Parliament while Thomas joined the Royalist-controlled Oxford Parliament. As a result, he was disabled from sitting at Westminster in January 1644 and fined £500 as a delinquent Royalist. Coke was arrested as a conspirator in 1651 and imprisoned. He saved his life by voluminous confession of his activities and associates. Coke purchased the manor of Melton Mowbray.

Coke died at his home in Tottenham and was buried at Melbourne on 23 August 1656.

Coke married Mary Pope, daughter of Richard Pope of Woolstaston, Shropshire. Their son John Coke was MP for Derby.

Parliament of England
Parliament suspended since 1629	Member of Parliament for Leicester; 1640–1644; With: Sir Simon Every, 1st Baronet 1640; Lord Grey of Groby 1640–1644	Succeeded by Lord Grey of Groby; Peter Temple
