= Thomas Bailly =

English Member of Parliament

Thomas Bailly was a Member of Parliament for Leicester (UK Parliament constituency) in September 1397.
