= William Humberstone (Leicester MP) =

British politician

William Humberstone (fl. 1377) was an English Member of Parliament (MP).

He was a Member of the Parliament of England for Leicester in 1377.
