= Alexander McArthur =

Australian politician (1814–1909)

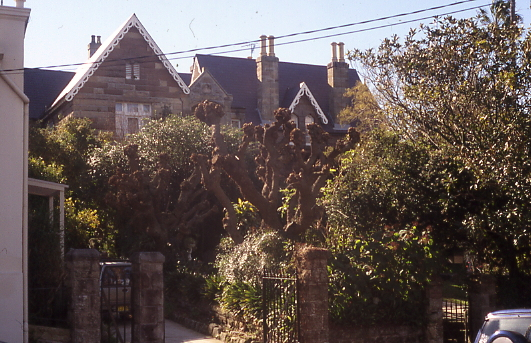
Nugal Hall, a Gothic Revival home in Randwick, New South Wales, built for McArthur

Alexander McArthur (10 March 1814 – 1 August 1909) was an Irish-born Australian and British businessman. He was a politician in both countries.

== Early life and career ==
Alexander McArthur was born on 10 March 1814 in Enniskillen, Ireland, to Wesleyan minister John McArthur and Sarah McArthur née Finlay. He was privately educated and, in 1830, was apprenticed to a merchant in Omagh. After being struck by severe fevers, McArthur arrived at Sydney on 24 January 1842.

He began business with a consignment from his brother William before becoming partners with William Little and James H. Atkinson and returning to Ireland in 1848, where he founded the softgood merchants W. and A. McArthur & Co. in 1850. Returning to Sydney the following year, McArthur worked as a shipping agent and profited greatly from gold exports. W. and A. McArthur built a large warehouse in the city and opened branches in Adelaide, Melbourne, Brisbane and Auckland.

On 19 August 1853, McArthur married Maria Bowden, the daughter of William Binnington Boyce, in the Toxteth Park Chapel. Living together at Strathmore, Glebe Point, they had two daughters and six sons, the eldest of which was the British politician William Alexander McArthur. After visiting England 1854–55, McArthur served on the Sydney Chamber of Commerce, as director of many building societies and insurance and mining companies, and as justice of the peace, and became a shareholder in the Australian Joint Stock Bank.

He was a devout Methodist and in 1843 he was elected to the committee of the Wesleyan Auxiliary Missionary Society of New South Wales. He was also treasurer of the Young Men's Christian Association of Sydney and a committee member of the Benevolent Asylum, the New South Wales Auxiliary Bible Society and other charities.

== Political career ==
In June 1859 McArthur was elected to the New South Wales Legislative Assembly for Newtown. He was a free trader and opposed state aid to religion. After being re-elected for Newtown in December 1860, he resigned in June 1861 when he was appointed to the New South Wales Legislative Council. In 1863 McArthur went to England to take over the London business and as a result vacated his seat through absence in October 1865.

== Return to Britain ==
McArthur was then a London merchant engaged in colonial trade and lived at Raleigh Hall, Brixton. He was a J. P. for Surrey and Deputy Lieutenant for the City of London. He became a Fellow of the Imperial Institute and from 1863 a Fellow of the Royal Geographical Society. He became a member of the Royal Colonial Institute in 1869, and also of the Victoria Institute and the British Association. From 1870 to 1873 he was a member of the first London School Board. In 1874 he was chosen as the Liberal Party candidate for Leicester. As an "advanced Liberal", his programme had much in common with Joseph Chamberlain's 'New Radicalism' and included the assimilation of the county to the borough franchise, reform of the land laws, abolition of clause 25 of the Education Act, and legislation against intemperance. He was elected Member of Parliament for Leicester in 1874. In parliament he advocated the annexation of Fiji, stricter observance of the Sabbath and Home Rule for Ireland. He retired after holding the seat for 18 years in 1892. In 1898 his firm became a limited liability company and in 1908 was reconstituted after liquidation.

McArthur died at Sydenham, London on 1 August 1909. He is buried with his family in a large mausoleum in West Norwood Cemetery.

Parliament of the United Kingdom
Preceded by John Dove Harris; Peter Alfred Taylor	Member of Parliament for Leicester; 1874–1892; With: Peter Alfred Taylor 1874–1884; James Allanson Picton 1884–1892	Succeeded by Sir James Whitehead; James Allanson Picton
