= Peter Alfred Taylor =

British politician, anti-vaccinationist and radical

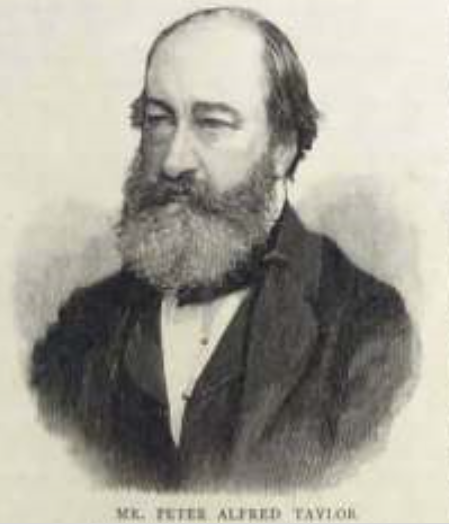
- Born: 30 July 1819; London
- Died: 20 December 1891 (aged 72); Brighton
- Occupation: radical politician

Peter Alfred Taylor (30 July 1819–20 December 1891) was a British politician and radical.

== Biography ==
Taylor was born in London. He was the son of another Peter Alfred Taylor, a silk merchant, and the nephew of Samuel Courtauld. He was educated at a school in Hove, Sussex, run by J. P. Malleson, his uncle and the Unitarian minister for Brighton. Here he met Clementia Doughty, known as Mentia, whom he married in 1842.

In the late 1830s he joined the family company of Samuel Courtauld & Co, later becoming a partner. The wealth from the company was what allowed him to develop and fund his radical interests, something which he conducted in concert with his wife.

Like his father he was active in the Anti-Corn Law League which was established in 1839. The Taylors were Unitarians and supporters of the South Place Chapel at Finsbury.

== Parliamentary career ==
After unsuccessful candidatures at Newcastle upon Tyne in 1858 and Leicester in 1861, he was elected unopposed as a Liberal MP for Leicester in February 1862. At his election, when his programme included abolition of church rates and separation of church and state, he was attacked as ‘anti-everything’. He was a member of the London Emancipation Society, founded in 1862 to promote the cause of the northern states in the American Civil War. He was a vice-president and one of the few middle-class supporters of the Reform League, constituted early in 1865 to campaign for manhood suffrage and the ballot, and appeared on League platforms during the parliamentary reform crisis of 1866–7. He attempted to achieve unity with the National Reform Union, which sought the more limited aim of household suffrage. With John Stuart Mill he was a parliamentary spokesman for the Jamaica Committee, formed in response to Edward John Eyre's brutal suppression of riots in Jamaica during the Morant Bay rebellion.

In 1863 Taylor bought the freehold of Aubrey House, a large detached house in the Campden Hill area of Holland Park in West London. The Taylors opened the Aubrey Institute in the grounds of the House; the Institute gave young people the chance to improve a poor education they might have had. The Taylors were closely involved in the movement for Italian unification and Giuseppe Mazzini was a frequent visitor to Aubrey House. A reception for Giuseppe Garibaldi was held at Aubrey House during his celebrated 1864 visit to London.

Mentia Taylor's 'Pen and Pencil Club' at Aubrey House, at which the work of young writers and artists was read and exhibited, became noted. In addition, Aubrey House was known for salons with radical attendees. The Taylors' social gatherings were also described by the American author Louisa May Alcott.. A London County Council blue plaque commemorates the Taylors and other notable residents of Aubrey House.

From 1879, Taylor was against compulsory vaccination on the basis that penalties for refusing vaccination were infringements of personal rights. He commented that vaccination was a 'delusion-a baseless superstition; that it afforded no protection from smallpox'. Leicester was a hotbed of political debates about vaccination in the context of sanitation and quality of lymph available for the working classes. Taylor was President of the London Society for the Abolition of Compulsory Vaccination.

In 1873, ill health forced Taylor to retire from London to Brighton, where he founded clubs for working men, notably the Nineteenth Century Club, a forum for advanced radical and secularist views. He stood down from parliament in June 1884. Peter Taylor died at home on 20 December 1891 and was buried at the Extramural Cemetery in Brighton on the 23rd.

His obituary in The Englishwoman's Review remembered him as 'one of the oldest supporters' of women's suffrage. In the House of Commons, he voted with John Stuart Mill in 1867, and 'never once failed to record his vote in favour of Women's Suffrage in every division which took place, from that time until 1884'.

== Selected publications ==
- Payment of Members (1870)
- Game Laws Laws (1873)
- Opening of Museums on Sundays (1874)
- The Cat (1875)
- Current Fallacies About Vaccination (1881)
- Anti-Vaccination (1882)
- Speeches of Mr. P.A. Taylor and Mr. C.H. Hopwood on Vaccination (1883)
- Personal Rights (1884)

Parliament of the United Kingdom
Preceded by John Biggs; William Unwin Heygate	Member of Parliament for Leicester; 1862–1884; With: William Unwin Heygate 1862–1865; John Dove Harris 1865–1874; Alexander McArthur 1874–1884	Succeeded by Alexander McArthur and James Allanson Picton
