= Thomas Grey, Lord Grey of Groby =

English Member of Parliament (died 1657)

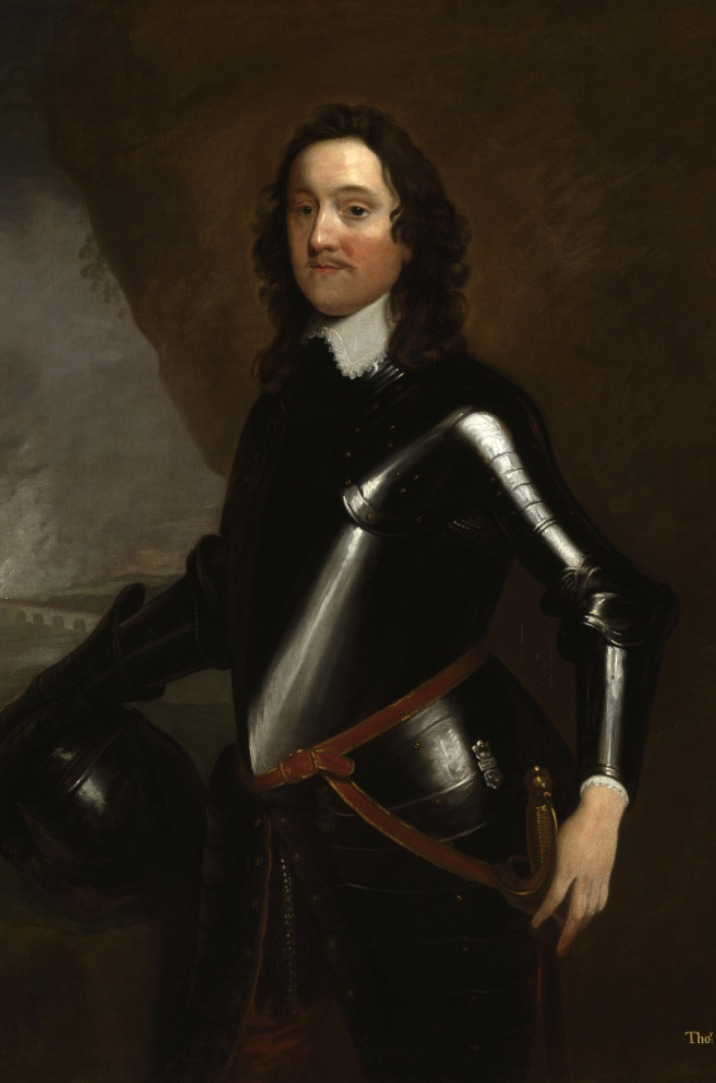
- Lord Grey of Groby

Member of Parliament for Leicester
- In office 1640–1653

Personal details
- Born: c. 1623
- Died: April or May 1657 (aged 33–34)
- Spouse: Dorothy Bourchier (m. 1646)
- Children: Thomas Grey
- Parent: Henry Grey (father)
- Relatives: William Cecil (grandfather)
- Military career
- Allegiance: Parliamentarians; England
- Wars: First English Civil War; Third English Civil War

Thomas Grey, Lord Grey of Groby (c. 1623 – 1657), was an elected Member of Parliament for Leicester during the English Long Parliament, an active member of the Parliamentary party and a regicide. He was the eldest son of Henry Grey, 1st Earl of Stamford, using his father's as his own courtesy title, and Anne Cecil, daughter of William Cecil, 2nd Earl of Exeter.

In January 1643, during the First English Civil War he was appointed Commander-in-Chief of the forces of the Parliament in the Midland Counties and Governor of Leicester. In 1648 he won some credit for his share in the pursuit and capture of the Duke of Hamilton; he assisted Colonel Pride in purging the Parliament by helping to identify members to be excluded. Later in 1648, he was made commissioner of the court which tried King Charles I. His signature on the death warrant indicates that he was a strong advocate for the execution of the King, because he signed after the President of the court John Bradshaw and before Oliver Cromwell, who was third to sign out of a total of fifty nine commissioners (judges). Grey was the only person of nobility to sign the death warrant.

A member of the Council of State under the Commonwealth, Lord Grey of Groby fought against the Scots in 1651 during the Third English Civil War. A supporter of the Good Old Cause, in February 1655 during the Protectorate he was arrested on suspicion of conspiring against Cromwell who was by now Lord Protector, but he was, however, soon released. He predeceased his father in April or May 1657.

== Early life ==
Thomas Grey was born in 1623 to Henry Grey, 2nd Baron Grey of Groby and Anne Cecil daughter of William Cecil, 2nd Earl of Exeter. He spent most of his youth in the Bradgate House, construction of which was begun by a late ancestor of his; Sir John Grey of Groby, and in Groby Manor. In 1628 Thomas at the age of five acquired the courtesy title of Lord Grey of Groby when his father was created the 1st Earl of Stamford. At the age of either 10 or 11, his family entertained Charles I and his wife Henrietta Maria of France in the Bradgate House. The royal visit was an event that marked a rise within the family fortune. Yet fortune would soon turn on the Grey household. The family, having issues with failed business aspirations and also with both local and national policy, began to turn against the king in 1634. Furthering the rift with the Monarchy was the family's Puritan history. By 1640 a 17-year-old Thomas Grey was in a world where tensions were growing rapidly on a national scale. With the English Civil War looming, in 1641 Grey was elected a Member of Parliament for Leicester in the House of Commons and was admitted to Gray's Inn like his father before him. He was also later that same year selected among twelve other members of the same committee to present the Grand Remonstrance and petition to the Monarchy. The petition was in protest to the King for "Oppressions in Religion, Church Government and Discipline." For his actions in the committee he was referred to as "a Lord dear to the House of Commons".

== Military career ==
On 16 January 1643, Thomas, Lord Grey of Groby was appointed commander-in-chief of the midland counties association and then ordered to take special care of Nottingham during the second Civil War. He took up headquarters there in June 1643, with a force of approximately 6,000 men. In a letter to his son Thomas, dated 5 March 1643, Henry Grey (Thomas' father) describes a battle to sweep the country, going through such towns as Lutterworth, Hinckley, Barwell, Lichfield, and Newark. On 29 August 1643, at Aylesbury, he joined the Earl of Essex on the march to relieve Gloucester. After the siege was raised, he fought at the first battle of Newbury for which he received thanks. In 1644, he received more appreciation for the reduction of places in Derbyshire. He then left Leicester due to a misunderstanding but was, in 1645, petitioned back to meet a royalist attack. In 1648, Lord Grey raised troops in Leicestershire. After the defeat of the Scots at Preston, he pursued the Duke of Hamilton and his horse to Uttoxeter and took credit for his capture, though Duke Hamilton claimed he surrendered. Until August, Grey held various commands in the militia. In 1651, he was sent to raise volunteers with the commission of commander-in-chief in the counties of Leicester, Nottingham, Northampton and Rutland, to meet the Scottish invasion. In September, Sir Edward Massie surrendered to Lord Grey after the battle of Worcester.

== Regicide ==
By end of the year 1643, Grey's views began to diverge from his father's moderate ideas and in 1644 he left Leicester because of misunderstanding with the county. In 1645 Lord Grey was forced to give up command by the Self-Denying Ordinance of April 1645 and it was after this that he entered a political alliance with radical and republican politicians, also petitioning to meet the royalist attack. On 6 December 1648 Lord Grey assisted with Pride's Purge (pointing out 'obnoxious' members who were to be removed from the house), he was also a supporter of the Leveller Cause. On 16 February 1649 he served as one of the Judges against King Charles I, after which he gained notoriety as regicide. Grey was the second of the 59 regicides to sign and the only aristocrat to sign the death warrant which resulted in King Charles's execution on 30 January 1649.

== Imprisonment and death ==
In 1649 he became the Counselor of State and was nominated for Council of State until an ambiguous disgrace. In 1653, he became disenchanted with Oliver Cromwell because he dissolved the Rump and on 12 February 1655 Grey joined the Fifth Monarchists. He was arrested on suspicion by Colonel Hacker, acting on Protector's orders, and despite being "much distempered with gout" was taken prisoner at Windsor Castle. In July 1655 he was released following an application to the Protector. However, from his release until his death in 1657 he took no active part in politics.

== Family ==
On 4 June 1646, at the age of 23, Lord Grey married Dorothy, daughter of Edward Bourchier, 4th Earl of Bath. In 1654, their only son Thomas was born, who would succeed his grandfather to the Earldom of Stamford.

== Arms ==
Arms of Grey

The arms of the head of the Grey family are blazoned Barry of six argent and azure in chief three torteaux gules.

== Notes ==
Parliament of England
| Preceded by Thomas Coke; Simon Every | Member of Parliament for Leicester; 1640–1653; With: Thomas Coke 1640–1644; Peter Temple 1645–1653 | Succeeded by Not represented in the Barebones parliament |
