= Samuel Duckworth =

British barrister and politician (1786-1847)

Samuel Duckworth (1786 – 3 December 1847) was a British barrister and politician.

Born in Manchester, Duckworth studied at Trinity College, Cambridge, then followed his father in becoming a solicitor and barrister, practising at the Chancery Bar. At the 1837 UK general election, he stood in Leicester and won a seat as a Radical Whig. In February 1839, he was appointed as Master in Chancery, and so left Parliament.

Parliament of the United Kingdom
Preceded by Thomas Gladstone; Edward Goulburn	Member of Parliament for Leicester; 1837–1839; With: John Easthope	Succeeded by Wynne Ellis; John Easthope
