= William Unwin Heygate =

British Conservative Member of Parliament and Leicestershire politician

William Unwin Heygate (12 March 1825 - 2 March 1902) was a British Conservative Member of Parliament and Leicestershire politician.

== Biography ==
Heygate was born on 12 March 1825, the second son of Sir William Heygate, 1st Baronet (1782-1844), Member of Parliament and Lord Mayor of London. He was educated at Eton College and Merton College, Oxford, where he was awarded a B. A. in 1847 and an M. A. in 1850. He became a pupil at Lincoln's Inn on 6 November 1846 and was called to the bar on 19 November 1850.

After unsuccessfully contesting Bridport in 1857, Heygate entered the Parliament for the Conservative Party from Leicester in 1861, but was defeated in the 1865 General election. He returned briefly as a member from Stamford in a by-election in 1868 (the constituency was abolished later the same year), and was again elected for South Leicestershire in 1870, serving until he stepped down in 1880.

Heygate was a prominent politician in Leicestershire. He was an Alderman of Leicestershire County Council, a Justice of the peace and a Deputy Lieutenant of the county. In business, he was Chairman of Pare′s Leicestershire Banking Company, a director of the Midland Railway, and of the Canada Company.

Heygate died at the Hotel Burlington, in Dover, 2 March 1902.

== Family ==
Heygate married, Constance Mary Beaumont, daughter of Sir George Beaumont 8th baronet, on 6 July 1852. The couple had four children:

- William Howley Beaumont Heygate (20 May 1854 – 21 September 1928), served as a Captain in the British Army
- Reginald Beaumont Heygate (10 October 1857 – 5 January 1903)
- Mary Florence Heygate (16 January 1861 – 1 July 1929)
- Harry Beaumont Heygate (8 Feb 1872 – 20 July 1897)

Parliament of the United Kingdom
Preceded by John Biggs and Joseph William Noble	Member of Parliament for Leicester; 1861–1865; With: John Biggs 1861–1862; Peter Alfred Taylor 1862–1865	Succeeded by John Dove Harris and Peter Alfred Taylor
Preceded by Albert Pell and Viscount Curzon	Member of Parliament for South Leicestershire; 1870–1880; With: Albert Pell 1870–1880	Succeeded by Albert Pell and Thomas Paget
