= Eliot Crawshay-Williams =

British author, soldier, and politician (1879–1962)

Eliot Crawshay-Williams

Eliot Crawshay-Williams (4 September 1879 – 11 May 1962), was a British author, army officer, and Liberal Party politician. He was a Member of Parliament (MP) and Parliamentary Private Secretary to Lloyd George and Winston Churchill.

== Early life ==
Crawshay-Williams was the son of Arthur John Williams, a Welsh barrister and politician and Rose Harriette Crawshay, the daughter of Ironmaster Robert Thompson Crawshay. He was educated at Eton, and Trinity College, Oxford.

He was commissioned a second lieutenant in the Royal Field Artillery on 26 May 1900, and promoted to lieutenant on 25 April 1902.

== Election to Parliament ==
At the 1906 general election he stood as a Liberal Party (UK) candidate in the Chorley constituency in Lancashire. He had been employed by Winston Churchill at the Colonial Office from 1906 to 1908.

He was elected at the January 1910 general election as MP for Leicester, serving as parliamentary private secretary to David Lloyd George.

He resigned from Parliament in 1913 following a divorce case brought by fellow Liberal, and old schoolfriend Hubert Carr-Gomm the MP for Rotherhithe. It was as he wrote in his autobiography "the death blow of my career".

== Service during the First World War ==
During the First World War, Crawshay-Williams saw active service in the 1st Leicestershire Royal Horse Artillery in Egypt and Palestine from 1915 to 1917. From 1918 to 1920 he was attached to the headquarters of the Northern Command mainly based in Egypt. During World War II he served as Chief Civil Defence Officer at Treforest.

== Literary work ==
In later life, he devoted his time to the writing of fiction and political texts and to Welsh affairs. Eliot Crawshay-Williams wrote numerous novels, short stories, poetry, plays and film scripts. Some of his works include the screenplay Service for Ladies (1932), the play Fascination (1931) and the novel Night in the Hotel (1931). He also wrote Across Persia (1907) about his experiences on an eight-month trek across the deserts of Iran. He is remembered for his Grand Guignol one-act plays Rounding the Triangle, E. and O. E. and others, collected as Five Grand Guignol Plays. 1924.

== Views on the Second World War ==
In June 2010, a letter written by Crawshay-Williams to Churchill, pleading with the by-then prime minister to come to terms with Adolf Hitler, was sold by New York publishing executive Steve Forbes. It was written in 1940, before the U.S. had joined the war. "I'm all for winning this war if it can be done," the letter said, adding that "an informed view of the situation shows that we've really not got a practical chance of actual ultimate victory" and that "no questions of prestige should stand in the way of our using our nuisance value while we have one to get the best peace terms possible."

Churchill's reply was bitingly brief and to the point. "I am ashamed of you for writing such a letter. I return it to you -- to burn and forget."

The two letters combined fetched $51,264.

Crawshay-Williams died in May 1962 aged 82.

== Bibliography ==
- Crawshay-Williams, Eliot. Across Persia, 1907. From Internet Archive.
- Crawshay-Williams, Eliot; Simple Story: An Accidental Autobiography, 1935
- J Graham Jones; Champion of Liberalism: Eliot Crawshay-Williams in Journal of Liberal History, Issue 59, Summer 2008
- Obituary in The Times - 12 May 1962
- Toye, Richard, Lloyd George and Churchill: rivals for greatness London: Macmillan, 2007.

Parliament of the United Kingdom
Preceded by Franklin Thomasson; Ramsay MacDonald	Member of Parliament for Leicester; January 1910 – 1913; With: Ramsay MacDonald	Succeeded by Gordon Hewart; Ramsay MacDonald
