= Richard Foxton (Leicester MP) =

Richard Foxton was an English Member of Parliament (MP).

He was a Member of the Parliament of England for Leicester in 1334.
