= Richard Clarke =

Richard Clarke may refer to:

== Government and politics ==
- Richard Clarke (MP), Member of Parliament for Lynn in 1584
- Richard A. Clarke (born 1950), retired U.S. government official, expert in counter-terrorism, and author
- Richard Henry Clarke (1843–1906), U.S. Representative from Alabama
- Richard W. B. Clarke (1910–1975), UK civil servant
- Richard Clarke (Ontario MPP), Canadian politician
- Richard Clarke (born 1967) Campaigner and Welsh Politician from Treorchy

== Sports ==
- Richard Clarke (boxer) (born 1963), Jamaican boxer
- Richard Clarke (footballer, born 1979), Northern Irish football manager
- Richard Clarke (footballer, born 1985), Northern Irish footballer with Newry City & Glentoran, see 2008–09 Irish League Cup
- Richard Clarke (rugby league) (born 1962), rugby league footballer of the 1980s and 1990s
- Richard Clarke (sailor) (born 1968), Canadian Olympic yacht racer

== Religion ==
- Richard Clarke (priest) (died 1634), English Anglican vicar, on the committee translating the King James version of the Bible
- J. Richard Clarke (1927–2022), leader in the Church of Jesus Christ of Latter-day Saints
- Richard Clarke (bishop) (born 1949), Church of Ireland bishop

== Others ==
- Richard Clarke (actor), in films such as Notorious (1946)
- Richard Clarke (frontiersman) (1845–1930), English frontiersman and scout in the United States; inspiration for character Deadwood Dick
- Richard Clarke (merchant) (1711–1795), Boston merchant and Loyalist, father-in-law of John Singleton Copley
- Richard Clarke (radio personality) (born 1978), radio presenter on 95.8 Capital FM and The Big Top 40 Show
- Richard D. Clarke (born 1962), United States Army general

== See also ==
- Richard Clark (disambiguation)
- Dick Clark (disambiguation)
- Richard Clerke (disambiguation)
