= Joshua Walmsley =

English businessman and politician

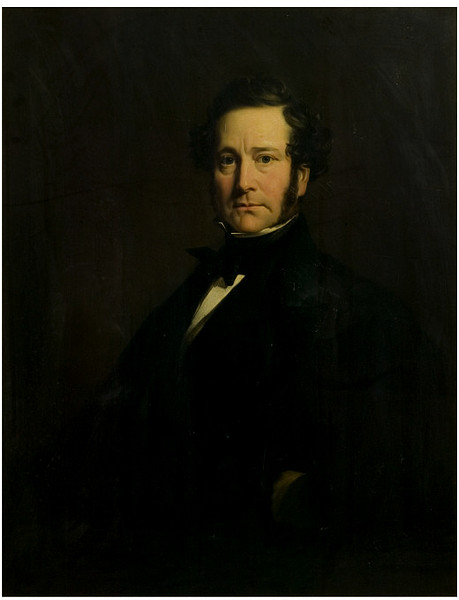
A c. 1843 portrait of Walmsley

Sir Joshua Walmsley (1794–1871) was an English businessman and Liberal Party politician.

== Early life and education ==
The son of John Walmsley, an architect, builder and marble mason, he was born in Liverpool on 29 September 1794, and educated at Knowsley, Lancashire, and Eden Hall, Westmorland.

== Career ==
Following the death of his father in 1807, Walmsley became a teacher in Eden Hall School, and after returning to Liverpool in 1811, he took a teaching position at Knowles's school. He entered the service of a corn merchant in 1814, and at the end of this engagement went into the same business himself.

He was an early advocate of the repeal of the duty on corn, and was afterwards an active worker with Richard Cobden, John Bright, and others in the Anti-Cornlaw League. In 1826 he took the presidency of the Liverpool Mechanics' Institution. At about the same time Walmsley got to know George Stephenson, in whose railway schemes he was interested, and with whom he joined in purchasing the Snibstone estate, near Ashby-de-la-Zouch, where rich seams of coal were found. He was elected a member of the Liverpool town council in 1835, and worked to improve the police, sanitation and education of the city.

He was one of the 49 founder members of the historic Liverpool Chess Club in 1837 which was situated in the Lyceum building on Bold Street. He was appointed Mayor in November 1838, and knighted on the occasion of Queen Victoria's marriage.

With Lord Palmerston, Walmsley unsuccessfully contested Liverpool in the Liberal interest in June 1841. He retired to Ranton Abbey, Staffordshire, in 1843, and at the general election of 1847 was elected M.P. for Leicester, but was unseated on petition. He started the National Reform Association about this time, and was its president and chief organiser for many years.

In 1849, he was returned as M.P. for Bolton in Lancashire, but in 1852 exchanged that seat for Leicester, where his efforts on behalf of the framework knitters had made him popular. He lost his seat in 1857, and practically retired from public life, although he retained the presidency of the National Sunday League from 1856 to 1869.

== Death ==
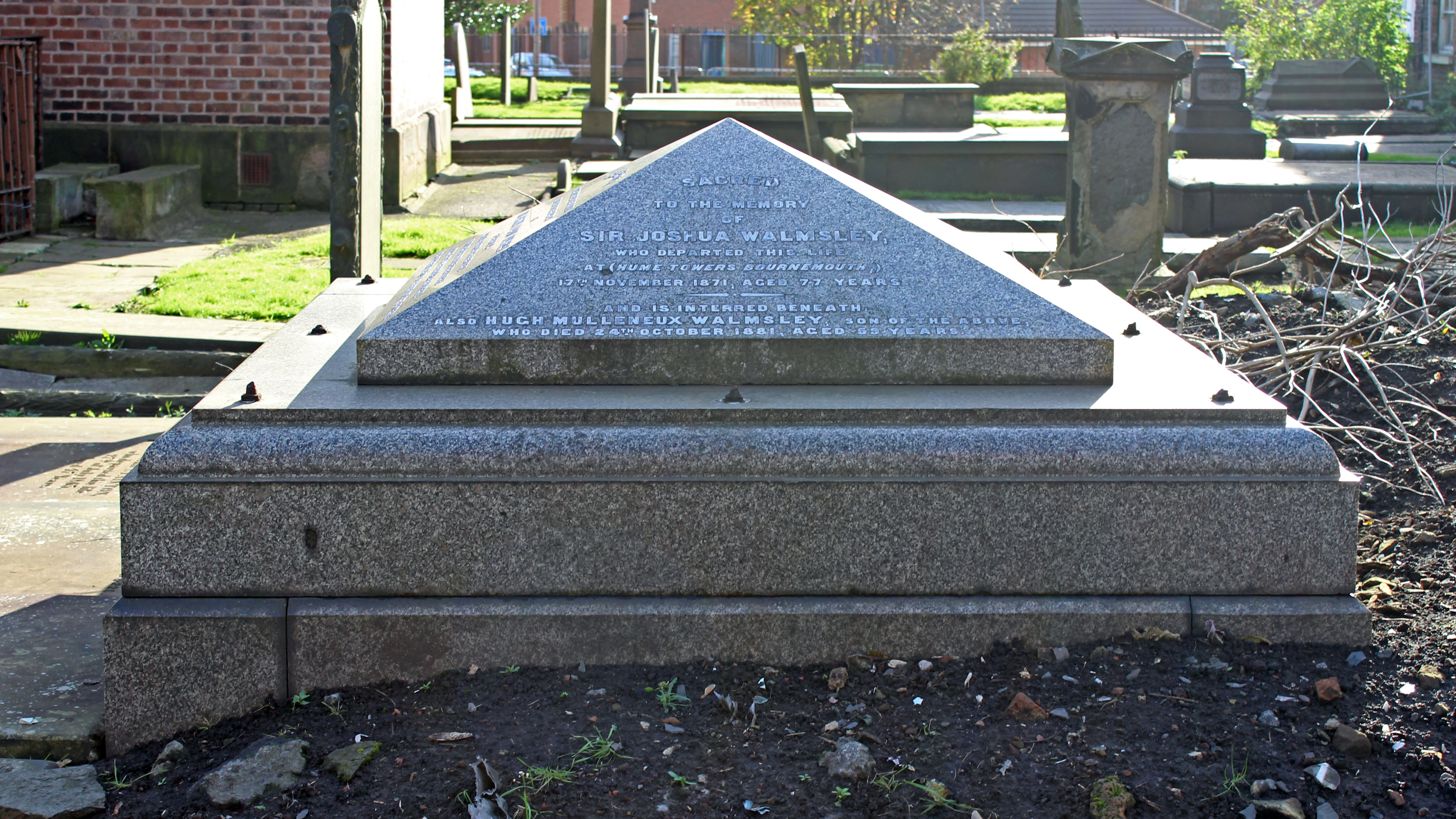
Walmsley's family tomb at All Saints, Edge Hill

He died on 17 November 1871 at Hume Towers, his residence at Bournemouth, leaving issue, of whom H. M. Walmsley wrote The Life of Sir Joshua Walmsley (London 1879). He was interred at All Saints Church, Edge Hill, Liverpool. His wife, whom he married in 1815, née Adeline Mulleneux, survived him by two years.

== Footnotes ==
Parliament of the United Kingdom
Preceded by Wynne Ellis; Sir John Easthope	Member of Parliament for Leicester; 1847–1848; With: Richard Gardner	Succeeded by John Ellis; Richard Harris
Preceded by John Bowring; Stephen Blair	Member of Parliament for Bolton; 1849–1852; With: Stephen Blair	Succeeded by Thomas Barnes; Joseph Crook
Preceded by Richard Harris; John Ellis	Member of Parliament for Leicester; 1852–1857; With: Richard Gardner to 1856; John Biggs from 1856	Succeeded by John Biggs; John Dove Harris
