= John Rolleston (British politician) =

British politician

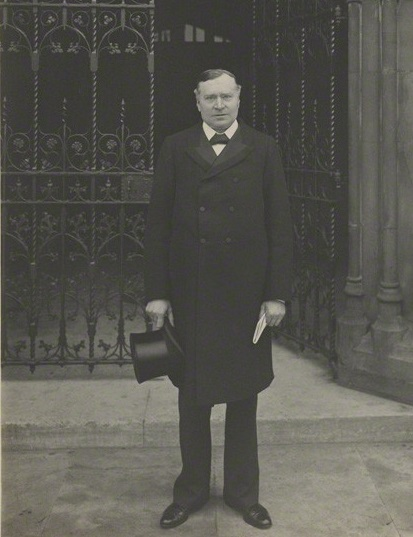
Sir John Rolleston

Sir John Fowke Lancelot Rolleston DL JP (26 March 1848 – 9 April 1919) was a British Conservative Party politician.

Rolleston was the eldest son of Rev. William Lancelot Rolleston, vicar of Great Dalby and Scraptoft, and his wife, Mary Sophia Fowke, daughter of Sir Frederick Gustavus Fowke, 1st Baronet.

He was educated at Repton School and King's College London. He was the leader of the Conservatives in Leicester. Following two defeats at the polls, he was elected as a Member of Parliament for Leicester in 1900; the seat then having two MPs. He sat until 1906 when he was again defeated by the Liberal-Labour coalition. At the January 1910 general election, he became the Conservative Member of Parliament for Hertford and held the seat until 1916. He was knighted in 1897.

Rolleston was also a prominent freemason. After several years of declining health, he died at his home in Glen Parva, Leicestershire, at the age of 71.

Parliament of the United Kingdom
Preceded by Henry Broadhurst and Walter Hazell	Member of Parliament for Leicester; 1900–1906; With: Henry Broadhurst	Succeeded by Henry Broadhurst and Ramsay MacDonald
Preceded by Abel Henry Smith	Member of Parliament for Hertford; 1910–1916	Succeeded by Noel Pemberton Billing
