= Joseph William Noble =

British Liberal politician

Member of Parliament for Leicester
- In office 2 May 1859 – 6 January 1861 Serving with John Biggs
- Preceded by: John Biggs; John Dove Harris
- Succeeded by: John Biggs; William Unwin Heygate

Personal details
- Born: 1799
- Died: 6 January 1861 (aged 61) Málaga, Spain
- Party: Liberal

Joseph William Noble (1799 – 6 January 1861) was a British Liberal politician.

Noble was a highly respected local medical practitioner who was elected Liberal MP for Leicester at the 1859 general election with a majority of 20 votes. He held the seat until his death in 1861.

Noble died in Málaga, Spain. His daughters built the Noble Hospital in Málaga as a memorial to him.

Parliament of the United Kingdom
Preceded by John Dove Harris; John Biggs	Member of Parliament for Leicester; 1859–1861; With: John Biggs	Succeeded by John Biggs; William Unwin Heygate
