= Ralph Burton (Leicester MP) =

English Politician

Ralph Burton (fl. 1322–1340), was an English member of parliament (MP).

Burton was a Member of the Parliament of England for Leicester in 1322 and 1340.
