= Dick Clark (disambiguation) =

Dick Clark (1929–2012) was an American entertainer and producer.

Dick Clark may also refer to:

- Dick Clark (Iowa politician) (1928–2023), U.S. senator
- Dick Clark (Florida politician) (1933–2019), American politician
- Dick Clark (basketball) (1944–1988), American basketball player
- Dick Clark (architect) (1944–2017), American architect

== See also ==
- Richard Clark (disambiguation)
- Richard Clarke (disambiguation)
