= John Tonge (cricketer) =

English cricketer

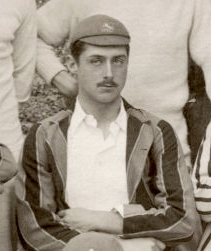
- Tonge in 1888

Personal information
- Full name: John Norton Tonge
- Born: 9 July 1865; Otford, Kent, England
- Died: 8 July 1903 (aged 37); Morants Court, Chevening, Kent, England
- Batting: Right-handed
- Bowling: Right-arm medium
- Relatives: William Tonge (brother); Walter Brooks (son-in-law)

Domestic team information
- Years: Team
- 1884–1897: Kent
- FC debut: 18 August 1884 Kent v Derbyshire
- Last FC: 1 October 1897 PF Warner's XI v Gentlemen of Philadelphia

Career statistics
Competition	First-class
Matches	38
Runs scored	895
Batting average	13.76
100s/50s	0/3
Top score	60
Balls bowled	816
Wickets	9
Bowling average	39.55
5 wickets in innings	0
10 wickets in match	0
Best bowling	3/14
Catches/stumpings	7/–
- Source: CricInfo, 5 June 2020

John Norton Tonge (9 July 1865 – 8 July 1903) was an English amateur cricketer who played for Kent County Cricket Club in the late 19th century.

Tonge was born at Otford in Kent in 1884, the son of William and Anna Tonge (née Bird). He grew up at Southam in Warwickshire and attended nearby Cheltenham College as a day boy. He did not play cricket for the school XI and worked in the London Stock Exchange after leaving Cheltenham. He played club cricket for teams such as Bickley Park, and an innings of 110 for the Kent Second XI against Gravesend saw him selected for the county First XI in 1884. He made his first-class cricket debut against Derbyshire at Gravesend.

He made four appearances for the county in 1885 and went on to play for Kent each season until end of the decade, being aware his county cap in 1887. Unusually for an amateur, he played more frequently on grounds away from Kent. He made a total of 36 first-class appearances, although his batting for Kent never lived up to the form he showed at club level – he made several large scores for Bickley Park as well as such as Blackheath and Band of Brothers, an closely associated with Kent.

After playing twice for Kent in 1895 and four times in 1897 before touring North America with Plum Warner's XI and making his final two first-class appearances against the Gentlemen of Philadelphia.

He inherited Morants Court at Chevening in Kent after the death of his father in 1891 and in 1892 married Edith Boosey. The couple had one daughter, but Edith died in 1893 and Tonge did not remarry. After suffering from tuberculosis for some time, Tonge died in 1903 aged 37. His estate passed to his mother and his brother William, a British Army officer who played two first-class matches for Gloucestershire.

== Bibliography ==
- Carlaw, Derek (2020). Kent County Cricketers, A to Z: Part One (1806–1914) (PDF). Cardiff: ACS.
