= Tribune (Liberal Party newspaper) =

The Tribune was the official British Liberal Party newspaper founded by Franklin Thomasson MP in 1906 as a bold but disastrous experiment in newspaper production. It was a penny newspaper of a solid but serious nature, edited first by William Hill, formerly of the Westminster Gazette, and later by S.G. Pryor.

Thomasson gathered about him for the purpose one of the most distinguished staffs in the history of journalism, and the amount of money involved was enormous. However, Tribune was unable to generate a mass readership and attracted little advertising revenue. After losing some £300,000 on the paper—which, with 800 paid employees, was seriously overmanned—Thomasson was forced to liquidate his investment, and the Tribune ceased its short career in 1908.
