= Sir James Whitehead, 1st Baronet =

British merchant and Liberal politician

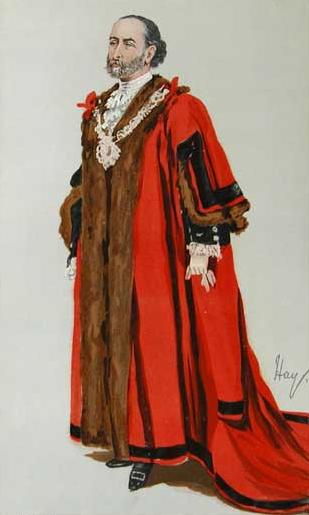
A caricature of Whitehead in Vanity Fair, 1889. The caption was "Bonnie Westmoreland".

Sir James Whitehead, 1st Baronet DL (2 March 1834 – 20 October 1917) was a British merchant and Liberal Party politician.

== Early life ==
Whitehead was born near Sedbergh, Yorkshire. He was educated at the grammar school in Appleby-in-Westmorland (which became the current Appleby Grammar School), and was apprenticed as a draper in Kendal. He made his way to Bradford and then London, and married Mercy Mildred Hinds in 1860. He established a business on Gresham Street and co-founded the business of John Barker & Company, Kensington, in 1870.

== Civic service ==
Having made his fortune, he retired from business in 1881 and concentrated on civic service. He became Alderman for Cheap ward in the City of London in 1882. He was Master of the Worshipful Company of Fanmakers in 1884, served as Sheriff that year and was then elected Lord Mayor of London for 1888. He replaced the circus-like Lord Mayor's Show with a State Procession, and was arbitrator in the London Dock Strike of 1889.

He also represented England at the Exposition Universelle in Paris in 1889. He was created a baronet on 26 November 1889, as Baronet Whitehead of Highfield House, Catford, then in Kent. He was appointed High Sheriff of the County of London for 1890.

He also did charitable works. He erected a statue of Sir Rowland Hill in 1879, and established the Rowland Hill Benevolent Fund for aged and distressed Post Office workers. He also named his son Rowland. He was Chairman of the Visiting Justices of Holloway Prison, Visitor of the City of London Asylum at Stone, Buckinghamshire, a committee member of Christ's Hospital, a Governor of Queen Anne's Bounty, Lord Lieutenant for the City of London, and a Justice of the Peace in Westmorland and in Kent. He became an Honorary Visitor at Borstal Prison in 1898.

== Parliamentary career ==
He stood for Parliament in the Appleby division of Westmorland in the general elections in 1885 and 1886. He was elected as a Member of Parliament (MP) for Leicester in the general election in 1892. He was a Liberal and supported William Ewart Gladstone. He was in favour of Irish home rule, reform of the House of Lords, and disestablishment of the Church of England. He devoted most of his energy in Parliament to the reform of railway freight rates, but served only two years as MP, resigning by becoming Steward of the Manor of Northstead in 1894.

He was also a Fellow of the Society of Antiquaries, the Royal Historical Society, the Royal Statistical Society, and a member of the International Peace Association and the Reform Club.

His papers are held by the archives of the Houses of Parliament. The baronetcy has since passed down to Sir Philip Whitehead, 6th Baronet.

Parliament of the United Kingdom
Preceded by Alexander McArthur and James Allanson Picton	Member of Parliament for Leicester; 1892–1894; With: James Allanson Picton	Succeeded by Walter Hazell and Henry Broadhurst
Civic offices
Preceded by Sir Polydore de Keyser	Lord Mayor of London; 1888 – 1889	Succeeded by Sir Henry Isaacs
Honorary titles
Preceded by Alfred de Rothschild	High Sheriff of the County of London; 1890–1891	Succeeded by Martin Smith
Baronetage of the United Kingdom
New creation	Baronet (of Highfield House); 1889–1917	Succeeded by George Whitehead
