= Ralph Norman (English politician) =

English Member of Parliament

Ralph Norman MP

Member of Parliament for Leicester
- In office 1294–1306

Ralph Norman (fl. 1294–1306) was an English Member of Parliament (MP). He was a Member of the Parliament of England for Leicester in 1294 and 1306.
