= Franklin Thomasson =

Franklin Thomasson

Franklin Thomasson (16 August 1873 – 29 October 1941) was an English 20th century MP.

Descended from a well known family of cotton spinners from Bolton, Lancashire, Franklin Thomasson was born on 16 August 1873 at Alderley Edge, Cheshire, the 3rd child of John Pennington Thomasson, who was a benefactor and MP for Bolton. He married Elizabeth, a daughter of the late Caleb Coffin of New York City on 11 July 1895. They had 3 children, John (1898), Marjorie (1901) and Barbara (1903).

Franklin contested the Westhoughton Parliamentary division in 1900, and Stretford in 1901, but on both occasions he was unsuccessful. He became Liberal MP for Leicester at a by-election in 1906, however, sharing the representation of the double-member constituency with Ramsay MacDonald. He retired at the January 1910 election.

In 1906, Thomasson ventured on a bold but disastrous experiment in newspaper production by founding the Tribune (1906–1908).

He played a large part in local political life before he left Bolton for London.

During World War I he commanded the 2-5th Battalion Loyal North Lancashire Regiment.

His wife Elizabeth died in 1927 and he then married Gertrude Prescott. They had three children, Margaret (1930), Christopher (1932) and Jenny (1937).

Franklin died of cancer on 29 October 1941 aged 68 and was buried at Lyndhurst, Hampshire.

Parliament of the United Kingdom
Preceded by Henry Broadhurst and Ramsay MacDonald	Member of Parliament for Leicester; 1906–January 1910; Served alongside: Ramsay MacDonald	Succeeded by Ramsay MacDonald and Eliot Crawshay-Williams
