= Richard Gardner (politician) =

English politician

Richard Gardner (1812 – 4 June 1856), was an English member of the United Kingdom Parliament, representing Leicestershire.

Gardner was born in Manchester, the eldest son of Robert Gardner, then a merchant in London. He attended first Charterhouse School, then Manchester School, then finally Wadham College, Oxford University where he graduated with a BA in 1838, at the same time he joined the Inner Temple and practised as a barrister. Through this time he spoke about universal suffrage and published some political pamphlets on the subject. He was elected as a Liberal member of parliament for Leicester in 1847 and was defeated in June, 1848, then re-elected in the general election of 1852, and held the seat until his death 4 June 1856.

He married in 1850, Lucy, the only daughter of count de Mandelsloh, minister plenipotentiary from Wurtemberg. He died 4 June 1856 from a heart condition, leaving his wife and two daughters. He is buried in Kensal Green Cemetery.

== Works ==
- An address to the middle and working classes engaged in trade and manufactures throughout the empire on the necessity of union at the present crisis (1842)

Parliament of the United Kingdom
Preceded by Sir John Easthope and Wynne Ellis	Member of Parliament for Leicester; 1847–1848; With: Sir Joshua Walmsley	Succeeded by John Ellis and Richard Harris
Preceded by John Ellis and Richard Harris	Member of Parliament for Leicester; 1852–56; With: Sir Joshua Walmsley	Succeeded by Sir Joshua Walmsley and John Biggs
