= John Hewet (MP) =

15th-century English politician

John Hewet (fl. 1413–1422) was an English Member of Parliament for Leicester in May 1413 and 1422.
