= John Easthope =

English politician (1784-1865)

Sir John Easthope, 1st Baronet MP (29 October 1784 – 11 December 1865) was a politician and journalist.

Easthope, born at Tewkesbury on 29 October 1784, was the eldest son of barge master Thomas Easthope by Elizabeth, daughter of John Leaver of Overbury, Worcestershire. The Easthope family had been long settled at Bridgnorth, Shropshire, until Easthope's grandfather, also Thomas, settled at Tewkesbury.

Easthope was originally a clerk in a provincial bank, and came to London to push his fortune. In 1818, in partnership with Mr. Allen, he became a stockbroker at 9 Exchange Buildings, City of London, and engaged in a series of speculations by which in the course of a few years he is said to have realised upwards of 150,000 Pounds. By 1838 the business was known as Easthope and Son, although his son was to die in France in 1849.

He was a magistrate for Middlesex and Surrey, chairman of the London and South Western Railway for 1837–1840, a director of the Canada Land Company, and chairman of the Mexican Mining Company.

He unsuccessfully contested St Albans in the Whig interest on 9 June 1821, but was elected and sat for that borough from 1826 to 1830. In 1831 he was returned for Banbury; in 1835 contested without success Southampton and Lewes, and sat for Leicester from 1837 until his retirement from parliamentary life in 1847, when he contested Bridgnorth unsuccessfully. He spoke in the house with great ease, and usually with much effect, but only on the Corn Laws and other questions with which he was well acquainted.

He purchased the Morning Chronicle from William Innell Clement in 1834 for £16,500, and sold his interest in the paper on his retirement from parliament in 1847. Charles Dickens was employed as a Parliamentary reporter in 1834, and he led a short, successful strike against Easthope in February 1836 over the terms of employment of his journalists. Easthope was known as a difficult employer, with the nickname 'Blast-hope'. Dickens left his employ in November 1836 to edit Bentley's Miscellany.

On 24 August 1841 he was created a baronet by Lord Melbourne, as a reward for his adherence to the Whig Party, and for his advocacy of a war policy in connection with the Syrian affairs.

He died at his home Fir Grove, near Weybridge, Surrey, on 11 December 1865 and was buried at the family vault in West Norwood Cemetery.Graham, Paul (1995). Dickens Connections. Friends of West Norwood Cemetery. He married, first, 4 August 1807, Ann, daughter of Jacob Stokes of Leopard House, Worcester; secondly, 19 September 1843, Elizabeth, eldest daughter of Colonel William Skyring, R.A., and widow of Major John Longley, R.A., who died on 23 January 1865. His daughter Louisa married Andrew Doyle, editor of The Morning Chronicle. Sir John left his estate to his surviving wife and his grandson, the historian John Andrew Doyle.

Parliament of the United Kingdom
Preceded by Sir Henry Wright-Wilson; Christopher Smith	Member of Parliament for St Albans; 1826–1830; With: Christopher Smith	Succeeded by Viscount Grimston; Charles Tennant
Preceded by Henry Villiers-Stuart	Member of Parliament for Banbury; 1831–1832	Succeeded by Henry William Tancred
Preceded by Thomas Gladstone; Edward Goulburn	Member of Parliament for Leicester; 1837–1847; With: Samuel Duckworth to 1839; Wynne Ellis from 1839	Succeeded by Sir Joshua Walmsley; Richard Gardner
Baronetage of the United Kingdom
New creation	Baronet (of Fir Grove); 1841–1865	Extinct
Business positions
Preceded by John Wright	Chairman of the Board of Directors of the London and South Western Railway; 1837–1840	Succeeded by Robert Garnett, MP
