= John Ellis (businessman) =

English Quaker and reformer (1789–1862)

John Ellis M.P.
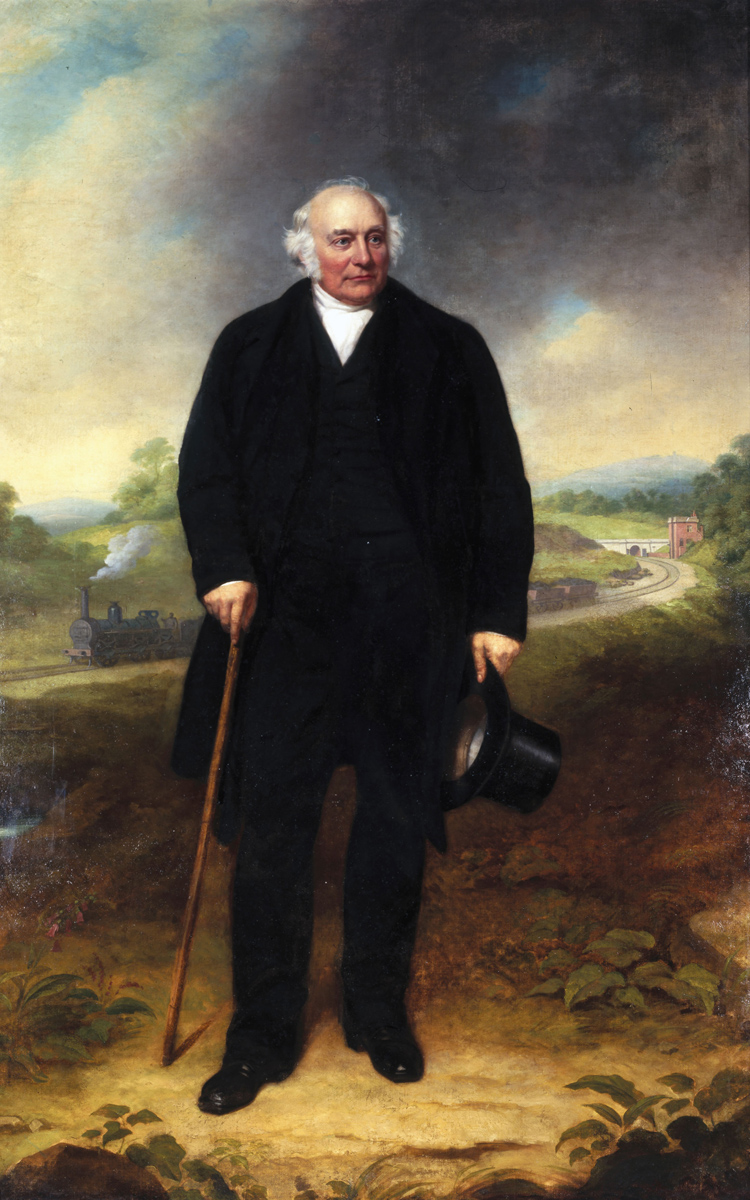
- Portrait by John Lucas
- Born: 3 August 1789; Beaumont Leys, Leicester, England
- Died: 26 October 1862 (aged 73); Belgrave Hall, Belgrave, Leicester, England
- Resting place: Leicester public cemetery
- Occupation: Businessman
- Known for: Railways
- Board member of: Midland Railway

John Ellis (1789–1862), of Beaumont Leys and Belgrave Hall in Leicester, was an English Quaker, a noted Liberal reformer and an accomplished businessman. Ellis was Chairman of the Midland Railway from 1849 to 1858 and a Member of Parliament for Leicester between 1848 and 1852.

== Birth ==
John Ellis was born near Leicester in 1789 to Joseph and Rebekah Ellis who were both members of the Society of Friends.

== Life ==
As a Quaker he was involved with the 1840 World's Anti-Slavery Convention in London and was included in the painting of it that is now in the National Portrait Gallery in London.

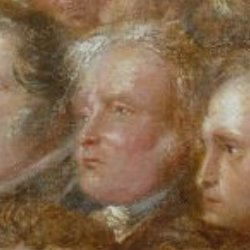
At the 1840 Anti-Slavery conference

He was instrumental in establishment of the Leicester and Swannington Railway and in 1842 served as a director of the Midland Counties Railway and was the major instigator in its amalgamation into the Midland Railway in 1844, being deputy-chairman from its establishment and becoming its chairman from 1849 to 1858 after the fall of George Hudson. He was also a director of the London & Birmingham, Birmingham & Gloucester and Dunstable Railways; and later of the Manchester & Buxton and London and North Western Railways. Ellis ran his family's 400 acre farm and orchard until 1846, owned a coal and lime merchandising company, and started a worsted spinning company, Whitmore & Ellis. He was also a partner and agent in two collieries. In 1858 he served as director of Pare's Leicester Banking Company as well a chairman of the Leicester Savings Bank. In public service, Ellis served as a Leicester town councilor in 1837 and a Leicester Alderman in 1838 prior to becoming an MP.

In 1845, John Ellis encountered Edward Sturge and Joseph Gibbons while they were travelling to a meeting regarding the sale of the Birmingham and Gloucester Railway to the Great Western Railway. Ellis saw an opportunity and offered that his company would purchase the Gloucester companies with 6% on their capital of £1.8 million if discussions with the GWR were inconclusive. The GWR declined to increase their offer, and the Gloucester companies turned back to Ellis.

== Death and legacy ==
John Ellis died in 1862 at Belgrave Hall and was survived by a son, Edward Shipley Ellis, from his first marriage to Martha Shipley (d:1817); his second wife Priscilla Evans, and their three sons and six daughters.

A grandson, also John Ellis, who lived 1841 to 1910, married into the Rowntree family (a prominent Quaker family), and became a Liberal politician and from 1905 to 1907 served as under-secretary of state for India in the Campbell-Bannerman administration.

Two great-granddaughters, Marian (Baroness Parmoor) and Edith Ellis were active anti-war campaigners at the time of the First World War. Marian strongly influenced her stepson, the politician Stafford Cripps.

Ellis Avenue and Ellis Meadows (2016), a 20-acre park and nature reserve created within the grounds of the former John Ellis School (closed in 1999) in Belgrave were named for him.

Parliament of the United Kingdom
Preceded by Sir Joshua Walmsley; Richard Gardner	Member of Parliament for Leicester; 1848–1852; With: Richard Harris	Succeeded by Sir Joshua Walmsley; Richard Gardner
