= Edward Goulburn (MP) =

British politician (1787–1868)

Edward Goulburn (1787 – 24 August 1868) was a British politician.

The younger brother of Henry Goulburn, Edward became a cornet in the Royal Regiment of Horse Guards in 1803, and a lieutenant the following year. In 1805, he published a satirical poem, "The Blueviad", which lampooned some of his fellow officers. He was prosecuted for libel and resigned his commission, instead enrolling at Middle Temple and training to become a barrister. During this period, he wrote another poem, "Pursuits of Fashion", and a novel, Edward de Montfort.

Goulburn was called to the bar in 1815, and due largely to the influence of his brother, was soon appointed as a judge in Wales, and then Recorder of Leicester, Lincoln and Boston. In 1829, he was made a serjeant-at-law.

At the 1832 UK general election, Goulburn stood for the Tories in Ipswich, but was not elected. At the 1835 UK general election, he stood in Leicester for the Conservative Party, winning a seat. He was defeated at the 1837 UK general election, and was also unsuccessful in 1841 in Carlisle. In 1842, he became a commissioner of the Court of Bankruptcy, serving until his death in 1868.

Parliament of the United Kingdom
Preceded by Wynne Ellis; William Evans	Member of Parliament for Leicester; 1835–1837; With: Thomas Gladstone	Succeeded by Samuel Duckworth; Sir John Easthope
