= William Devereux Palmer =

Electrical engineer

William Devereux Palmer is an electrical engineer at the U.S. Army Research Office in Durham, North Carolina. He was named a Fellow of the Institute of Electrical and Electronics Engineers (IEEE) in 2012 for his contributions to microwave and millimeter wave systems and sources.
