= Richard Clerk (MP) =

English politician

Richard Clerk was an English Member of Parliament (MP).

He was a Member of the Parliament of England for Leicester in 1334.
