= William Palmer (dean of Johannesburg) =

William Adolph Palmer (1881–1953) was Dean of Johannesburg from 1924 until 1951.

Palmer was ordained in 1912. His first post was at St Matthew Mission College, Keiskammahoek. He was then Principal of the Anglican Training College, Pietermaritzburg before his time as Dean; and then Warden of Zonnebloem College afterwards. He died on 3 October 1953.
