= Henry Carleton (judge) =

American judge

Henry Carleton (c.1785 – March 28, 1863) was an American jurist.

Henry Carleton Coxe was born in Virginia, and entered college from Athens, Georgia. He graduated from Yale College in 1806. After leaving college, he dropped the surname Coxe, removed to Mississippi, and finally established himself at New Orleans in 1814. He served as a Lieutenant of Infantry, under Gen. Andrew Jackson, in the campaign which terminated January 8, 1815. He then actively engaged in the profession of the Law, and soon after, in connection with Mr L. Moreau, he began the translation of those portions of Las Siete Partidas, a celebrated Spanish code of Law, which were observed in Louisiana. In 1832 he was appointed U. S. District Attorney for the Eastern District of Louisiana. He was afterward appointed a Judge of the Supreme Court of Louisiana, which post he resigned on account of ill health in 1839.

He visited Europe several times and traveled extensively in this country, and finally, a number of years since, took up his residence in Philadelphia. He devoted much attention to biblical, theological and metaphysical studies, and published in 1857 a volume on Liberty and Necessity. He was elected to the American Philosophical Society (APS) in 1859. A few days before his death he read an essay on the Will, before the APS. Notwithstanding his early life in the South and the exposure of his property to confiscation by the Confederates, he adhered uncompromisingly to the U.S. Constitution and the Union.

He was twice married — first to Mlle. d' Avezac de Castera, a sister of Mrs. Edward Livingston, and after her death to Miss Vanderburgh. He died in Philadelphia, March 28, 1863 in his 78th year.
