= William Tonge =

English cricketer

Personal information
- Born: 14 April 1862; Surrey
- Died: 2 May 1943 (aged 81); Buckinghamshire
- Batting: Right-handed

Domestic team information
- Years: Team
- 1880: Gloucestershire
- Source: Cricinfo, 1 April 2014

William Tonge (14 April 1862 – 2 May 1943) was an English cricketer. He played two matches for Gloucestershire in 1880.
