= Walter Brooks (British Army officer) =

English cricketer and British Army officer (1884–1965)

Personal information
- Full name: Walter Tyrrell Brooks
- Born: 23 February 1884; Kensington, London, England
- Died: 3 June 1965 (aged 81); Tunbridge Wells, Kent, England
- Relatives: John Tonge (father-in-law)

Domestic team information
- Years: Team
- 1902–1904: Oxfordshire

Career statistics
Competition	First-class
Matches	1
Runs scored	14
Batting average	14.00
100s/50s	0/0
Top score	13*
Balls bowled	42
Wickets	2
Bowling average	23.50
5 wickets in innings	0
10 wickets in match	0
Best bowling	1/9
Catches/stumpings	0/–
- Source: Cricinfo, 25 June 2019

Brigadier Walter Tyrrell Brooks MC (23 February 1884 – 3 June 1965) was an English first-class cricketer and British Army officer. Brooks served in the Duke of Cornwall's Light Infantry from 1904–40, serving in the First World War and receiving the Military Cross. He also played first-class cricket.

== Early life and military career ==
Brooks was born at Kensington in February 1884. He was educated at Marlborough College. He made his debut in minor counties cricket for Oxfordshire in the 1902, with Brooks playing minor counties cricket for Oxfordshire until 1904, making a total of eighteen appearances in the Minor Counties Championship. He attended the Royal Military College, Sandhurst, graduating in 1905 and enlisting with the Duke of Cornwall's Light Infantry (DCLI). His service number was 11289. He made a single appearance in first-class cricket for H. D. G. Leveson Gower's XI against Oxford University at Oxford in 1906. Batting twice in the match, he was dismissed by Trevor Branston for a single run in the H. D. G. Leveson Gower's XI first-innings, while in their second-innings he was unbeaten on 13. With the ball, he took the wicket of Branston in the first-innings and Wilfred Bird in their second-innings, finishing with match figures of 2 for 47. He was promoted to the rank of lieutenant in January 1909.

== WWI and later military career ==
Brooks served in the First World War with the DCLI, in the early month of which he was promoted to the rank of captain in December 1914. In January 1916 he was awarded the Military Cross, before he was seconded to the general staff in February 1917. He was made a brevet major in December 1917, and while serving on the general staff in October 1918 he was made a temporary lieutenant colonel. He was later made a brevet lieutenant colonel.

Over a decade later, after returning to Sandhurst to command a Company of Gentlemen Cadets, he was promoted to the rank of colonel in March 1932, with seniority antedated to February 1928. After that, he served as a staff officer in India from 1926 to 1927, and then was Commandant of the Small Arms School, Ahmedmagar, for two years, from 1927 to 1929. He was then Commanding Officer (CO) of the 2nd Battalion, DCLI from 1930 to 1932 before going to London to serve in another two-year posting, now as a General Staff Officer Grade 1 (GSO1) at the War Office.

Brooks retired from active service in October 1939, one month into the Second World War, holding the temporary rank of brigadier and placed in command of the 23rd Infantry Brigade. Up until that point he had served as an aide-de-camp to George VI. He was made an honorary brigadier in March 1941, by which time his service number was 11289. He died at Tunbridge Wells in June 1965. His father-in-law, John Tonge, was also a first-class cricketer.
