= Thomas Wakefield (politician) =

English politician

Thomas Wakefield (fl. 1384–1411) was an English bailiff, politician, and coroner, three times a Member of the Parliament of England.

Probably related to William Wakefield, one of the burgesses representing Leicester in the parliament of 1348, Thomas Wakefield was bailiff in 1384 and in April of the same year was sent to parliament as MP for Leicester for the first time. In 1388–1389 he was Warden of Leicester's Guild of Corpus Christi and in 1392 was one of the founders of a chantry chapel in the parish church of St Martin's. By 1390 he had become a coroner for Leicestershire, but in that year was removed from office on the grounds of lacking suitable qualifications. He was again sent to parliament in 1393 and January 1397. In 1407 and 1411 he was recorded as being present at the Leicester parliamentary elections.
