= Richard Clerk (bishop) =

Richard Clerk was a bishop in England and Ireland in the mid 15th century.

A priest in the Diocese of Meath, he was Bishop of Ross in Ireland from 1434 to 1448. He also acted as a suffragan bishop in the dioceses of London (1434–41); Canterbury (1439–65), and Salisbury (1454).

== Bibliography ==
- Fryde, E. B.; Greenway, D. E.; Porter, S.; Roy, I., eds. (1986). Handbook of British Chronology (3rd, reprinted 2003 ed.). Cambridge, England: Cambridge University Press. ISBN 0-521-56350-X.
