= Robert Cotton (MP, died 1559) =

English politician

Robert Cotton (by 1504–1559) was an English politician.

He was a member (MP) of the parliament of England for Leicester in March 1553.
