= Henry de Carleton =

Henry de Carleton (fl. 1306) was an English Member of Parliament for Leicester in 1306. He held four and a half carves of land in Carleton, having inherited it from Matilda de Karlton. His descendants lived in the manor house called Gezzerts or Gazettes.
