= William le Palmer =

William le Palmer was an English Member of Parliament (MP).

He was a Member of the Parliament of England for Leicester in 1307 and 1314.
