= Richard Clark =

Richard Clark may refer to:

- Richard Clark (Chamberlain of London) (1739–1831), English attorney
- Richard Clark (dermatologist), American dermatologist
- Richard Clark (business executive) (born 1946), president of Merck
- Richard Clark (director), British television director
- Richard Auldon Clark, American conductor
- Richard Clark (musician) (1780–1856), English musician and writer
- Richard J. Clark (born 1943), American operatic baritone
- Richard M. Clark (born 1964), U.S. Air Force General, first Black superintendent of the Air Force Academy

== See also ==
- Dick Clark (disambiguation)
- Richard Clarke (disambiguation)
- Richard Clerke (disambiguation)
- Richard Yeoman-Clark, British composer and sound engineer
