= John Tonge (MP) =

MP for Leicester

John Tonge was an MP for Leicester in 1407.
