= Billy Palmer (baseball) =

American baseball player (1864–1933)

William F. Palmer
- Pitcher
- Born: September 5, 1864; London, England
- Died: June 11, 1933 (aged 68); St Louis, Missouri, US
- Batted: Unknown Threw: Unknown

MLB debut
- May 28, 1885, for the St. Louis Maroons

Last MLB appearance
- June 3, 1885, for the St. Louis Maroons

MLB statistics
- Win–loss record: 0–4
- Earned run average: 3.44
- Strikeouts: 9
- Stats at Baseball Reference

Teams
- St. Louis Maroons (1885)

Billy Palmer (September 5, 1864 – June 11, 1933) was an English-born American Major League Baseball pitcher. He played for the St. Louis Maroons in 1885. He started four games for the Maroons in late May and early June, losing all four.

== Sources ==
- Career statistics from Baseball Reference
