= Peter Temple (regicide) =

English politician and one of the regicides of King Charles I of England

Peter Temple (ca. 1599 – 1663) was an English politician who sat in the House of Commons between 1645 and 1653. He was one of the regicides of King Charles I of England.

Temple of Temple Hall was a member of the county association for defence in 1642. He was a captain of horse and accused of cowardice in fleeing Leicester to London when the Royalist army approached Leicester in 1645. He was however pardoned and elected Member of Parliament for Leicester later in 1645 for the Long Parliament as replacement for a Royalist and remained in the Rump Parliament after Pride's Purge until 1653.

Temple signed Charles I's death-warrant in 1649, 16th out of the 59 signatories. At the restoration of the monarchy in 1660 he was excepted from the Act of Oblivion. His estate was confiscated and he was imprisoned in the Tower of London until his death.

Parliament of England
Preceded by Thomas Coke; Lord Grey of Groby	Member of Parliament for Leicester; 1645–1653; With: Lord Grey of Groby	Succeeded by Not represented in the Barebones parliament
