= Billy Palmer =

English footballer

Personal information
- Full name: William Palmer
- Date of birth: 4th Q, 1887
- Place of birth: Barnsley, England
- Date of death: 1955 (aged 67–68)
- Position: Outside left

Senior career*
Years	Team	Apps	(Gls)
1907–1908	Barnsley	0	(0)
1908	Mexborough Town	0	(0)
1908–1910	Nottingham Forest	12	(1)
1910–1912	Rotherham County	64	(?)
1912–1913	Bristol Rovers	23	(3)
1913–1915	Everton	22	(1)
1919–1922	Bristol Rovers	79	(11)
1922–1923	Gillingham	37	(4)
1923–1924	Doncaster Rovers	2	(0)
Total		239	(20+)
- * Club domestic league appearances and goals

William Palmer (1887–1955) was an English professional footballer who played for eight different clubs in over a seventeen-year span that was interrupted by the First World War.

Originally from Barnsley, Palmer joined his home town club in 1907 but left after less than a full season without having played any first team League games to join Mexborough Town in March 1908. Just three months later he joined First Division side Nottingham Forest, with whom he made his Football League debut. He made twelve appearances in Division One during a two-year spell, scoring once, before joining Rotherham County in 1910. Palmer spent a further two years in Rotherham and played for them in 64 consecutive games in the Midland League.

In 1912 he joined Southern League club Bristol Rovers, where he earned the nickname "Lady Palmer" because he rarely dirtied his shorts during a match. His twenty-three appearances for Rovers were of sufficient quality for Everton to pay the Bristol club £800 for his services, then a very large fee, and to take him for a second spell in Division One of the Football League. His time at Everton ended when League football was suspended due to the First World War, after having made 22 appearances in the First Division.

Palmer played one unofficial wartime match for Bradford City, before returning to one of his former teams, Bristol Rovers for a further three years. Each of those three seasons were spent in different divisions, he played 34 times in the Southern League during the 1919–20 season, thirty times in the Football League Third Division in 1920–21, and a further fifteen times in Division Three (South) in 1921–22.

The remainder of his career was spent with Gillingham and Doncaster Rovers, spending one year with each of them before retiring from football in 1924.

== Sources ==
- Jay, Mike; Byrne, Stephen (1994). Pirates in Profile: A Who's Who of Bristol Rovers Players. Bristol: Potten, Baber & Murray. pp. 188–189. ISBN 0-9524835-0-5.
