= Richard Clarke (priest) =

Richard Clarke or Clerke (died 1634) was an eminent scholar, translator and preacher in the Anglican Church.

Clarke was educated at Christ's College, Cambridge and was a Fellow there from 1583 to 1598. He was appointed Vicar of Minster on 18 October 1597 and Monkton in Thanet. On 8 May 1602 he was appointed one of the Six Preachers of Canterbury Cathedral. He served in the First Westminster Company that was charged with translating the first twelve books of the King James Version of the Bible. A large folio volume of his sermons was published posthumously by Charles White, M.A., in London in 1637. His will included legacies to the Cathedral Library, to Christ's Hospital and to the parish of Minster-in-Thanet.
