= Leicester (UK Parliament constituency) =

Parliamentary constituency in the United Kingdom, 1801–1918

- Former borough constituency for the House of Commons

1295–1918
- Seats: Two

Leicester was a parliamentary borough in Leicestershire, which elected two members of parliament (MPs) to the House of Commons from 1295 until 1918, when it was split into three single-member divisions.

== History ==
Leicester sent burgesses to Parliament for the first time in 1295.

== Members of Parliament ==
=== 1295–1640 ===
Parliament	First member	Second member
1294	Ralph Norman	Robert de Scarnford
1299	Robert Knythtecote	Roger de Glenne
?1299	Richard Donnington	Roger de Glenne
1301	Ralph Tewe	
1304	Richard Soning	Nicholas de Glenne
1306	Ralph Norman	Henry de Carleton
1307	William Lyndrych	William le Palmer
1308	Henry Erdington	Richard Eggbaston
1310	William Lyndrych	Peter de Kent
1311	William Lyndrych	Robert de Leicester
1312	William Clowne	Richard Leverych
?1312	Robert Hereward	Nicholas Mercer
1313	Roger de Glenne	John Stocton
1314	William de Benham	Simon de Lyndrych
?1314	Roger Pickering	William le Palmer
1318	Thomas Fox	William le Palmer, jnr
?1318	Henry Palmer	John Derby
1321	Geoffrey de Staunton	John Derby
1322	Ralph Burton	Walter Busseby
1326	William Reddington	William Jolly
1327	John FitzHenry of Leicester	John Geryn
1328	Richard Claver	John Leverich
1328	Richard Claver	John Geryn
1328	Rad de Seccheville	Robert de Waltham
1329	John de Glenne	Willim Petlyng
1330	Richard de Bonyngton	Robert de Gryndon or William Wareyn
1330	John de Leverych	Thomas Dawbenny
1332	Henry Merlins	Richard de Donnington
1332	William de Cloune	Richard Leverich
1333	John Leverych	John FitzHenry or John de Garthorp
1334	Richard Foxton	Richard Clerk
1334	John Leverich	Robert de Foston
1336	John Leverych	John Querndon
?1336	William Rodington	William le Palmer
1337	Richard de Donnington	Richard Leycester
1337	Richard de Donnington	John Martyn
1338	Richard de Donnington	John Querndon
1338	Richard de Donnington	John Turvey
?1338	William Palmer	Thomas Fox
?1338	John Harding	Robert Bonyng
1339	William Warryn	Thomas Fitz Robert
1339	William Leverich	Richard de Walcote
1340	Nicholas Radding	William Fitz Richard
?1340	Richard Walcote	William Brad
?1340	Ralph Burton	John Blake
1341	John le Clerk	William Donnington
1343	Walter Busseby	William Reddington
1346	Richard Walcot	William Dunstable
1347	Richard Beby	Allan Sutton
1348	John Recenour	William Wakefield
1350	William Dunstable	Thomas Beby
1351	William Dunstable	Thomas Beby
1354	John Martin	John de Hodynges
1355	Thomas Beby	
1357	John de Petlyng	Thomas de Crom.
1360	Thomas Beby	Roger Belgrave
?1360	Roger Knyghton	Thomas Beby
1362	Richard Knyghton	William Burton
1363	John Peterburgh	Roger Kilby
1365	William Tabb	John Stafford
1368	Walter Lynd	Roger de Belgrave
1369	William Burton	William atte Greene
1371	William Taillard	Richard de Knyghton
1372	William atte Greene	Roger Beby
1373	John Stafford	John Peterburgh
1375	Henry de Petlyng	Henry de Clipstone
1377	William Huntedon	John Stafford
?1377	William Humberstone	William de Thornton
1378	John Chapman	Andrew Glasewright
1379	John de Stafford	William Ferrour
1380	John Sherote	Richard Boyes
1381	Stephen Chambre	Robert Norton
1382	John Stafford	Thomas Wakefield
?1382	Roger Belgrave	Richard Braunston
1383	Geoffrey Clerk	John Fode
1386	Geoffrey Clerk	William Morton
1388 (Feb)	Geoffrey Clerk	William Morton
1388 (Sep)	Geoffrey Clerk	John Cook
1390 (Jan)	?Geoffrey Clerk	
1390 (Nov)		
1391	Geoffrey Clerk	Henry Beeby
1393	Thomas Wakefield	John Houghton
1394	?Geoffrey Clerk	Henry Beeby
1395	Robert Skillington	Henry Beeby
1397 (Jan)	Thomas Wakefield	Roger Humberston
1397 (Sep)	Thomas Bailly	Richard Falconer
1399	William Bispham	John Church
1401	John London	Peter Clerk
1402		
1404 (Jan)		
1404 (Oct)		
1406	John Donyngton	Roger Goldsmith
1407	Thomas Denton	John Tonge
1410	Robert Evington	John Church
1411	Robert Evington	Ralph Brasier
1413 (Feb)		
1413 (May)	John Hewet	John Church
1414 (Apr)	Ralph Brasier	Thomas Denton
1414 (Nov)	Henry Forster	Robert Evington
1415		
1416 (Mar)		
1416 (Oct)		
1417		
1419	Henry Forster	Ralph Brasier
1420	John Pykwell	John Church
1421 (May)	Ralph Brasier	John Church
1421 (Dec)	Henry Forster	John Nightingale
1423	Ralph Brasier	
1426	Ralph Brasier	
1432	Ralph Brasier	
1455–1456	Thomas Dalton	
1510–1515	No names known	
1523	William Bolt	Roger Wigston
1529	Thomas Brokesby	Robert Harward
1536	?	
1539	John Beaumont	William Wigston
1542	Robert Burdett	?John Beaumont
1545	Edward Hastings	John Throckmorton
1547	George Swillington	Ralph Skinner
1553 (Mar)	George Swillington	Robert Cotton
1553 (Oct)	William Faunt	Thomas Farnham
1554 (Apr)	Francis Farnham	Thomas Jenkinson
1554 (Nov)	Francis Farnham	Hugh Aston
1555	Francis Farnham	?
1558	Robert Breham	Maurice Tyttell
1559 (Jan)	John Hastings	Robert Breham
1562–1563	Robert Breham	Rubert Brokesby
1571	Thomas Cave	Stephen Hales
1572 (Apr)	Robert Breham	John Stanford I
1584 (Nov)	Henry Skipwith	Thomas Johnson
1586 (Oct)	Henry Skipwith	Thomas Johnson
1588 (Oct)	John Chippendale	Robert Heyrick
1593	John Stanford I	James Clarke
1597 (Sep)	George Parkins	John Stanford II
1601 (Oct)	George Belgrave	William Herrick
1604	William Skipwith, died 1610 and replaced by Henry Rich)	Henry Beaumont
1614	Henry Rich	Sir Francis Leigh
1621–1622	Sir Richard Moryson	Sir William Herrick
1624	Sir Humphrey May	William Ive
1625	Thomas Jermyn	Sir Humphrey May, sat for Lancaster and repl. by Sir George Hastings)
1626	Sir Humphrey May	Sir George Hastings
1628	Sir Humphrey May	Sir John Stanhope
1629–1640	No parliaments summoned	

=== 1640–1918 ===
Year	First member	First party	Second member	Second party
April 1640	Thomas Coke		Simon Every	
November 1640	Thomas Coke	Royalist	Lord Grey of Groby	Parliamentarian
January 1644	Coke disabled from sitting – seat vacant		Lord Grey of Groby	Parliamentarian
1645	Peter Temple		Lord Grey of Groby	Parliamentarian
1653	Leicester was unrepresented in the Barebones Parliament			
1654	Sir Arthur Hesilrige		William Stanley	
1656	Sir Arthur Hesilrige		William Stanley	
January 1659	Sir Arthur Hesilrige		William Stanley	
May 1659	Peter Temple		One seat vacant through the death of Lord Grey of Groby	
1660	Thomas Armeston		John Grey	
1661	Sir William Hartopp		Sir John Pretyman	
1677	Sir William Hartopp		John Grey	
1679	Sir Henry Beaumont		John Grey	
1685	Sir Henry Beaumont		Thomas Babington	
1689	Lawrence Carter		Thomas Babington	
1690	Lawrence Carter		Sir Edward Abney	
1695	Archdale Palmer		Sir Edward Abney	
1698	Sir William Villiers		Lawrence Carter	
1701	James Winstanley		Lawrence Carter	
1702	James Winstanley		Sir George Beaumont	
1719	Thomas Noble		Sir George Beaumont	
1722	(Sir) Lawrence Carter		Sir George Beaumont	
January 1727	Thomas Boothby-Skrymsher		Sir George Beaumont	
August 1727	George Wrighte		Sir George Beaumont	
1737	George Wrighte		James Wigley	
1765	George Wrighte		Anthony James Keck	
1766	John Darker		Anthony James Keck	
1768	Hon. Booth Grey	Whig	Eyre Coote	Whig
1774	Hon. Booth Grey	Whig	John Darker	Tory
February 1784	Hon. Booth Grey	Whig	Shukburgh Ashby	
April 1784	John Macnamara		Charles Loraine-Smith	
1790	Thomas Parkyns	Whig	Samuel Smith	Tory
1800	Thomas Babington	Tory	Samuel Smith	Tory
1818	John Mansfield	Tory	Thomas Pares	Whig
1826	Sir Charles Abney-Hastings	Tory	Robert Otway-Cave	Tory
1830	Sir Charles Abney-Hastings	Tory	William Evans	Whig
1831	Wynne Ellis	Radical	William Evans	Whig
1835	Edward Goulburn	Conservative	Thomas Gladstone	Conservative
1837	Samuel Duckworth	Radical	Sir John Easthope	Radical
1839	Wynne Ellis	Radical	Sir John Easthope	Radical
1847 (Note: The election of 1847 was declared void on petition and a by-election was held)	Sir Joshua Walmsley	Radical	Richard Gardner	Radical
1848	John Ellis	Radical	Richard Harris	Radical
1852	Sir Joshua Walmsley	Radical	Richard Gardner	Radical
1856	Sir Joshua Walmsley	Radical	John Biggs	Radical
1857	John Dove Harris	Whig	John Biggs	Radical
1859	Joseph William Noble	Liberal	John Biggs	Liberal
1861	William Unwin Heygate	Conservative	John Biggs	Liberal
1862	William Unwin Heygate	Conservative	Peter Alfred Taylor	Liberal
1865	John Dove Harris	Liberal	Peter Alfred Taylor	Liberal
1874	Alexander McArthur	Liberal	Peter Alfred Taylor	Liberal
1884	Alexander McArthur	Liberal	James Allanson Picton	Liberal
1892	Sir James Whitehead	Liberal	James Allanson Picton	Liberal
1894	Henry Broadhurst	Liberal	Walter Hazell	Liberal
1900	Henry Broadhurst	Liberal	Sir John Rolleston	Conservative
January 1906	Henry Broadhurst	Liberal	Ramsay MacDonald	Labour
March 1906	Franklin Thomasson	Liberal	Ramsay MacDonald	Labour
1910	Eliot Crawshay-Williams	Liberal	Ramsay MacDonald	Labour
1913	Sir Gordon Hewart	Liberal	Ramsay MacDonald	Labour
1918	Constituency abolished: see Leicester East, Leicester South, Leicester West			

== Election results ==
=== Elections in the 1830s ===
General election 1830: Leicester
Party	Candidate	Votes	%
Tory	Charles Abney-Hastings	Unopposed	
Whig	William Evans	Unopposed	
Registered electors		c. 5,000	
Tory hold			
Whig gain from Tory			

General election 1831: Leicester
Party	Candidate	Votes	%
Whig	William Evans	Unopposed	
Radical	Wynne Ellis	Unopposed	
Registered electors		c. 5,000	
Whig hold			
Radical gain from Tory			

General election 1832: Leicester
Party	Candidate	Votes	%
Whig	William Evans	1,663	37.3
Radical	Wynne Ellis	1,527	34.3
Tory	John Ward-Boughton-Leigh	1,266	28.4
Turnout		2,795	91.3
Registered electors		3,063	
Majority		136	3.0
Whig hold			
Majority		261	5.9
Radical hold			

General election 1835: Leicester
Party	Candidate	Votes	%	±%
Conservative	Edward Goulburn	1,484	26.4	+12.2
Conservative	Thomas Gladstone	1,475	26.2	+12.0
Whig	William Evans	1,352	24.0	−13.3
Radical	Wynne Ellis	1,314	23.4	−10.9
Majority		123	2.2	N/A
Turnout		2,820	92.5	+1.2
Registered electors		3,049		
Conservative gain from Whig		Swing	+9.4	
Conservative gain from Radical		Swing	+8.7	

General election 1837: Leicester
Party	Candidate	Votes	%	±%
Radical	Samuel Duckworth	1,816	27.8	+16.1
Radical	John Easthope	1,816	27.8	+16.1
Conservative	Edward Goulburn	1,454	22.2	−4.2
Conservative	Thomas Gladstone	1,453	22.2	−4.0
Majority		362	5.6	N/A
Turnout		3,270	91.6	−0.9
Registered electors		3,569		
Radical gain from Conservative		Swing	+10.1	
Radical gain from Conservative		Swing	+10.1	

Duckworth resigned after being appointed as Master of the Court of Chancery.

By-election, 22 March 1839: Leicester
Party	Candidate	Votes	%	±%
Radical	Wynne Ellis	1,666	54.9	−0.7
Conservative	Charles Frewen	1,371	45.1	+0.7
Majority		295	9.8	+4.2
Turnout		3,037	84.8	−6.8
Registered electors		3,581		
Radical hold		Swing	−0.7	

=== Elections in the 1840s ===
General election 1841: Leicester
Party	Candidate	Votes	%	±%
Radical	John Easthope	Unopposed		
Radical	Wynne Ellis	Unopposed		
Registered electors		4,280		
Radical hold				
Radical hold				

General election 1847: Leicester
Party	Candidate	Votes	%	±%
Radical	Joshua Walmsley	1,671	35.5	N/A
Radical	Richard Gardner	1,621	34.4	N/A
Conservative	James Parker	1,421	30.2	New
Majority		200	4.2	N/A
Turnout		3,067 (est)	72.3 (est)	N/A
Registered electors		4,241		
Radical hold		Swing	N/A	
Radical hold		Swing	N/A	

The election was declared void on petition on 1 June 1848, due to bribery by Walmsley and Gardner's agents, causing a by-election.

By-election, 2 September 1848: Leicester
Party	Candidate	Votes	%	±%
Radical	John Ellis	Unopposed		
Radical	Richard Harris	Unopposed		
Radical hold				
Radical hold				

=== Elections in the 1850s ===
General election 1852: Leicester
Party	Candidate	Votes	%	±%
Radical	Joshua Walmsley	1,673	30.0	−5.5
Radical	Richard Gardner	1,673	30.0	−4.4
Whig	James Wilde	1,116	20.0	N/A
Whig	Geoffrey Palmer	1,114	20.0	N/A
Majority		557	10.0	+5.8
Turnout		2,788 (est)	72.4 (est)	+0.1
Registered electors		3,853		
Radical hold		Swing		
Radical hold		Swing		

Gardner's death caused a by-election.

By-election, 18 June 1856: Leicester
Party	Candidate	Votes	%	±%
Radical	John Biggs	Unopposed		
Radical hold				

General election 1857: Leicester
Party	Candidate	Votes	%	±%
Whig	John Dove Harris	1,618	34.7	−5.3
Radical	John Biggs	1,603	34.4	+4.4
Radical	Joshua Walmsley	1,440	30.9	+0.9
Majority		178	3.8	N/A
Turnout		2,331 (est)	56.0 (est)	−16.4
Registered electors		4,162		
Whig gain from Radical		Swing	−5.3	
Radical hold		Swing	+3.5	

General election 1859: Leicester
Party	Candidate	Votes	%	±%
Liberal	John Biggs	1,584	26.6	−7.8
Liberal	Joseph William Noble	1,496	25.1	N/A
Conservative	William Unwin Heygate	1,476	24.8	New
Liberal	John Dove Harris	1,397	23.5	−11.2
Majority		20	0.3	−3.5
Turnout		2,977 (est)	70.8 (est)	+14.8
Registered electors		4,207		
Liberal hold		Swing		
Liberal hold		Swing		

=== Elections in the 1860s ===
Noble's death caused a by-election.

By-election, 7 February 1861: Leicester
Party	Candidate	Votes	%	±%
Conservative	William Unwin Heygate	1,596	44.3	+19.5
Liberal	John Dove Harris	1,033	28.6	+5.1
Liberal	Peter Alfred Taylor	977	27.1	N/A
Majority		563	15.7	N/A
Turnout		3,606	90.9	+20.1
Registered electors		3,965		
Conservative gain from Liberal		Swing	+7.2	

Biggs resigned, causing a by-election.

By-election, 17 February 1862: Leicester
Party	Candidate	Votes	%	±%
Liberal	Peter Alfred Taylor	Unopposed		
Liberal hold				

General election 1865: Leicester
Party	Candidate	Votes	%	±%
Liberal	John Dove Harris	2,295	35.6	+12.1
Liberal	Peter Alfred Taylor	2,199	34.2	+7.6
Conservative	William Unwin Heygate	1,945	30.2	+5.4
Majority		254	4.0	+3.7
Turnout		4,192 (est)	88.0 (est)	+17.2
Registered electors		4,762		
Liberal hold		Swing	+4.7	
Liberal hold		Swing	+2.5	

General election 1868: Leicester
Party	Candidate	Votes	%	±%
Liberal	Peter Alfred Taylor	7,148	43.3	+9.1
Liberal	John Dove Harris	6,876	41.6	+6.0
Independent Liberal	John Baker Greene	2,494	15.1	New
Majority		4,382	26.5	+22.5
Turnout		9,506 (est)	62.7 (est)	−25.3
Registered electors		15,161		
Liberal hold		Swing		
Liberal hold		Swing		

=== Elections in the 1870s ===
General election 1874: Leicester
Party	Candidate	Votes	%	±%
Liberal	Peter Alfred Taylor	7,408	36.5	−6.8
Liberal	Alexander McArthur	7,283	35.9	−5.7
Conservative	John Henry Boyer Warner	5,615	27.7	New
Majority		1,668	8.2	−18.3
Turnout		12,961 (est)	75.9 (est)	+13.2
Registered electors		17,069		
Liberal hold		Swing		
Liberal hold		Swing		

=== Elections in the 1880s ===
General election 1880: Leicester
Party	Candidate	Votes	%	±%
Liberal	Peter Alfred Taylor	10,675	36.7	+0.2
Liberal	Alexander McArthur	10,438	35.8	−0.1
Conservative	William Winterton	4,186	14.4	+0.5
Conservative	John Henry Boyer Warner	3,820	13.1	−0.8
Majority		6,252	21.4	+13.2
Turnout		14,560 (est)	77.4 (est)	+1.5
Registered electors		18,808		
Liberal hold		Swing	−0.2	
Liberal hold		Swing	+0.4	

Taylor resigned, causing a by-election.

By-election, 27 Jun 1884: Leicester
Party	Candidate	Votes	%	±%
Liberal	James Allanson Picton	Unopposed		
Liberal hold				

General election 1885: Leicester
Party	Candidate	Votes	%	±%
Liberal	James Allanson Picton	11,480	39.1	+2.4
Liberal	Alexander McArthur	11,121	37.9	+2.1
Conservative	William Millican	6,751	23.0	−4.5
Majority		4,370	14.9	−6.5
Turnout		18,104	83.5	+6.1 (est)
Registered electors		21,671		
Liberal hold		Swing	+2.4	
Liberal hold		Swing	+2.2	

General election 1886: Leicester
Party	Candidate	Votes	%	±%
Liberal	James Allanson Picton	9,914	39.2	+0.1
Liberal	Alexander McArthur	9,681	38.3	+0.4
Liberal Unionist	Robert Bickersteth	5,686	22.5	−0.5
Majority		3,995	15.8	+0.9
Turnout		15,456	71.3	−12.2
Registered electors		21,671		
Liberal hold		Swing	+0.2	
Liberal hold		Swing	+0.3	

=== Elections in the 1890s ===
General election 1892: Leicester
Party	Candidate	Votes	%	±%
Liberal	James Allanson Picton	Unopposed		
Liberal	James Whitehead	Unopposed		
Liberal hold				
Liberal hold				

Both Picton and Whitehead resigned. The House of Commons passed separate resolutions for two by-elections, and two separate election writs were issued to Leicester Corporation. However, Israel Hart, the mayor of Leicester, decided to economise by holding a single by-election for both vacancies. In 1895, a select committee of the Commons reported that this procedure was incorrect, but that since it was adopted in good faith and without objection from any of the candidates, the result would be allowed to stand.

Walter Hazell

1894 Leicester by-election
Party	Candidate	Votes	%	±%
Lib-Lab	Henry Broadhurst	9,464	33.8	N/A
Liberal	Walter Hazell	7,184	25.6	N/A
Conservative	John Rolleston	6,967	24.9	New
Ind. Labour Party	Joseph Burgess	4,402	15.7	New
Majority		217	0.7	N/A
Turnout		17,853 (est)	77.2	N/A
Registered electors		23,125		
Lib-Lab hold		Swing	N/A	
Liberal hold		Swing	N/A	

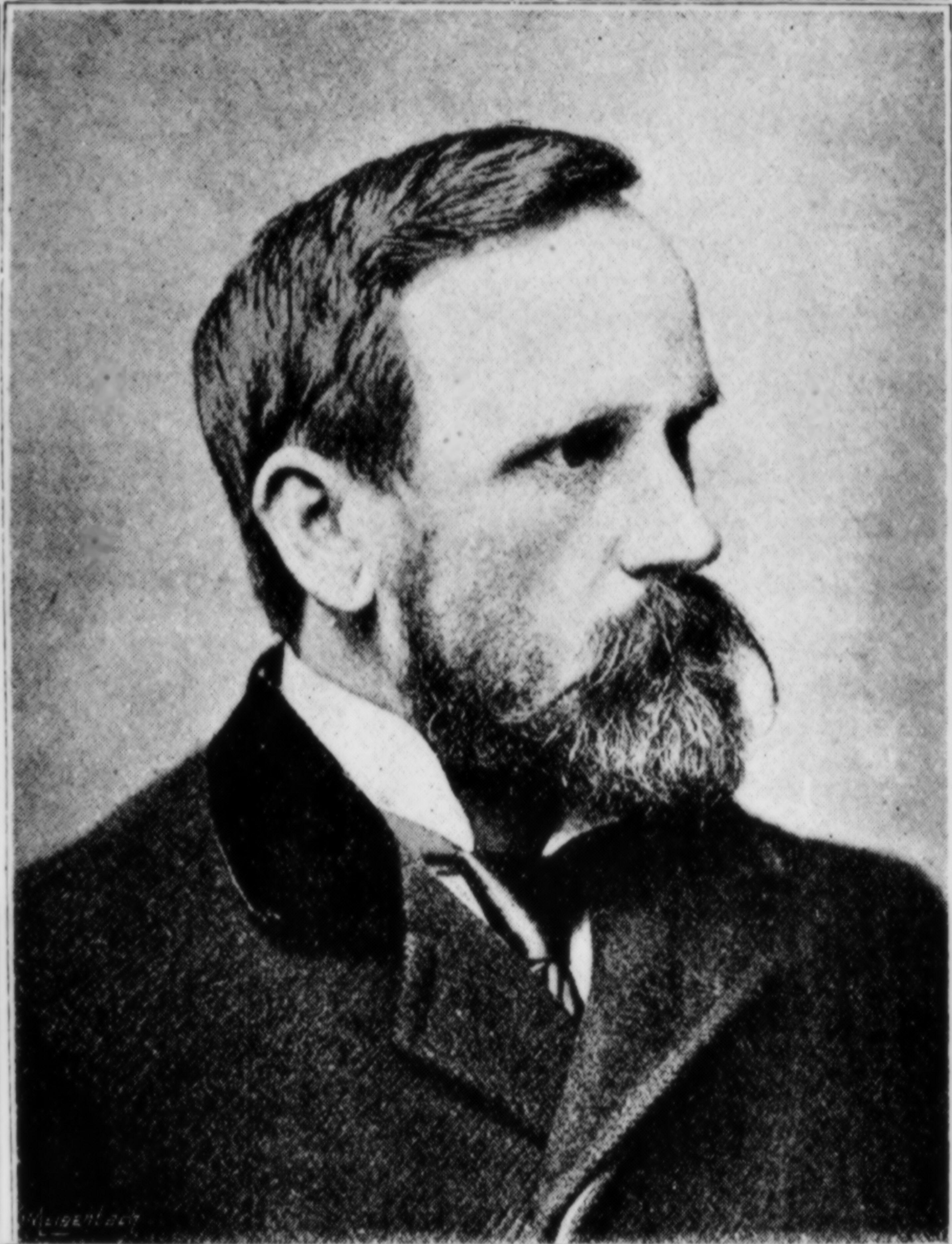
Joseph Burgess

General election 1895: Leicester
Party	Candidate	Votes	%	±%
Lib-Lab	Henry Broadhurst	9,792	33.6	N/A
Liberal	Walter Hazell	7,753	26.5	N/A
Conservative	John Rolleston	7,654	26.2	N/A
Ind. Labour Party	Joseph Burgess	4,009	13.7	N/A
Majority		99	0.3	N/A
Turnout		18,856 (est)	77.2	N/A
Registered electors		24,113		
Lib-Lab hold		Swing	N/A	
Liberal hold		Swing	N/A	

=== Elections in the 1900s ===
Henry Broadhurst

General election 1900: Leicester
Party	Candidate	Votes	%	±%
Lib-Lab	Henry Broadhurst	10,385	32.3	−1.3
Conservative	John Rolleston	9,066	28.2	+2.0
Liberal	Walter Hazell	8,528	26.5	0.0
Labour Repr. Cmte.	Ramsay MacDonald	4,164	13.0	N/A
Turnout		32,143	83.3	+5.1
Registered electors		24,962		
Majority		6,221	19.3	+19.0
Lib-Lab hold		Swing	−1.7	
Majority		538	1.7	N/A
Conservative gain from Liberal		Swing	+1.0	

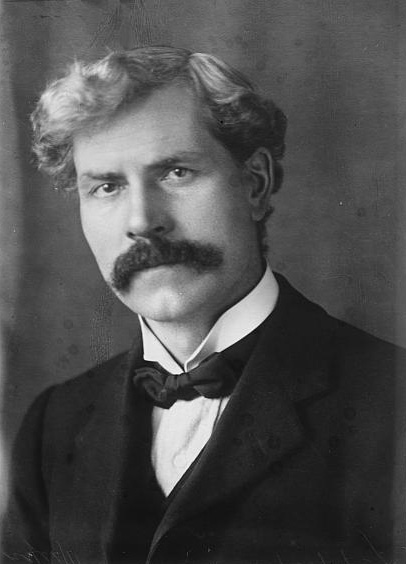
MacDonald

General election 1906: Leicester
Party	Candidate	Votes	%	±%
Lib-Lab	Henry Broadhurst	14,745	39.9	+7.6
Labour Repr. Cmte.	Ramsay MacDonald	14,685	39.8	+26.8
Conservative	John Rolleston	7,504	20.3	−7.9
Turnout		36,934	88.9	+5.6
Registered electors		25,129		
Majority		7,241	19.6	+0.3
Lib-Lab hold		Swing	+7.8	
Majority		7,181	19.5	N/A
Labour Repr. Cmte. gain from Conservative		Swing	+17.4	

Thomasson

1906 Leicester by-election
Party	Candidate	Votes	%	±%
Liberal	Franklin Thomasson	10,766	59.9	+20.0
Conservative	John Rolleston	7,206	40.1	+19.8
Majority		3,560	19.8	+0.2
Turnout		17,972	71.5	−17.4
Registered electors		25,129		
Liberal hold		Swing	+0.1	

=== Elections in the 1910s ===
General election January 1910: Leicester
Party	Candidate	Votes	%	±%
Liberal	Eliot Crawshay-Williams	14,643	32.0	−7.9
Labour	Ramsay MacDonald	14,337	31.4	−8.4
Conservative	J. Foster Fraser	8,548	18.7	+8.5'"`UNIQ−−ref−0000012C−QINU`"'
Conservative	Edward Bagley	8,192	17.9	+7.7'"`UNIQ−−ref−0000012D−QINU`"'
Turnout		45,720	91.8	+2.9
Registered electors		25,336		
Majority		6,095	13.3	−6.3
Liberal hold		Swing	−8.2	
Majority		5,789	12.7	−6.8
Labour hold		Swing	−8.0	

General election December 1910: Leicester
Party	Candidate	Votes	%	±%
Liberal	Eliot Crawshay-Williams	13,238	39.2	+7.2
Labour	Ramsay MacDonald	12,998	38.5	+7.1
Conservative	Alured Myddelton Wilshere	7,547	22.3	−14.3
Turnout		33,783	83.5	−8.3
Registered electors		25,336		
Majority		5,691	16.9	+3.6
Liberal hold		Swing	+11.0	
Majority		5,451	16.2	+3.5
Labour hold		Swing	+10.7	

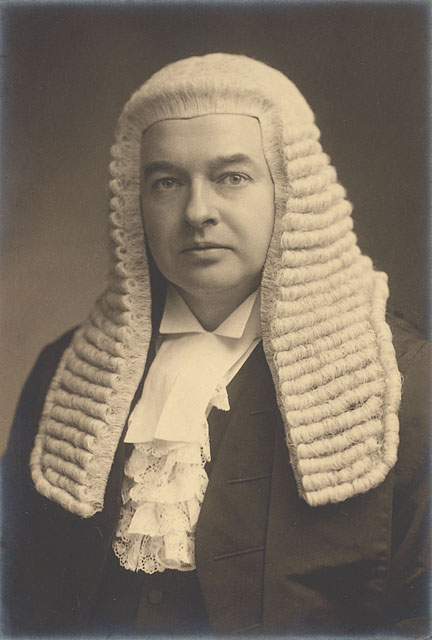
Gordon Hewart

1913 Leicester by-election
Party	Candidate	Votes	%	±%
Liberal	Gordon Hewart	10,863	47.8	+8.6
Unionist	Alured Myddelton Wilshere	9,279	40.8	+18.5
British Socialist Party	Edward Hartley	2,580	11.4	New
Majority		1,584	7.0	−9.2
Turnout		22,722	84.2	+0.7
Registered electors		26,972		
Liberal hold		Swing	−4.9	

== Notes and references ==
Notes

References

- D. Brunton & D. H. Pennington, Members of the Long Parliament (London: George Allen & Unwin, 1954)
- Cobbett's Parliamentary history of England, from the Norman Conquest in 1066 to the year 1803. London: Thomas Hansard. 1808. Archived from the original on 4 September 2015.
- The Constitutional Year Book for 1913 (London: National Union of Conservative and Unionist Associations, 1913)
- F W S Craig, British Parliamentary Election Results 1832–1885 (2nd edition, Aldershot: Parliamentary Research Services, 1989)
- J E Neale, The Elizabethan House of Commons (London: Jonathan Cape, 1949)
- J Holladay Philbin, Parliamentary Representation 1832 – England and Wales (New Haven: Yale University Press, 1965)
- Leigh Rayment's Historical List of MPs – Constituencies beginning with "L" (part 2)
