= Richard Harris (1777–1854) =

British politician

Member of Parliament for Leicester
- In office 2 September 1848 – 9 July 1852 Serving with John Ellis
- Preceded by: Joshua Walmsley; Richard Gardner
- Succeeded by: Joshua Walmsley; Richard Gardner

Personal details
- Born: 1777
- Died: 2 February 1854 (aged 76–77)
- Party: Radical

Richard Harris (1777 – 2 February 1854) was a British Radical politician.

Harris was elected Radical Member of Parliament (MP) for Leicester at a by-election in 1848—caused by the previous election being declared void on petition—and held the seat until 1852 when he did not seek re-election.

Parliament of the United Kingdom
| Preceded by Joshua Walmsley; Richard Gardner | Member of Parliament for Leicester; 1848–1852; With: John Ellis | Succeeded by Joshua Walmsley; Richard Gardner |
