= Walter Hazell =

Walter Hazell (1843 – 12 February 1919) was a British politician and publisher.

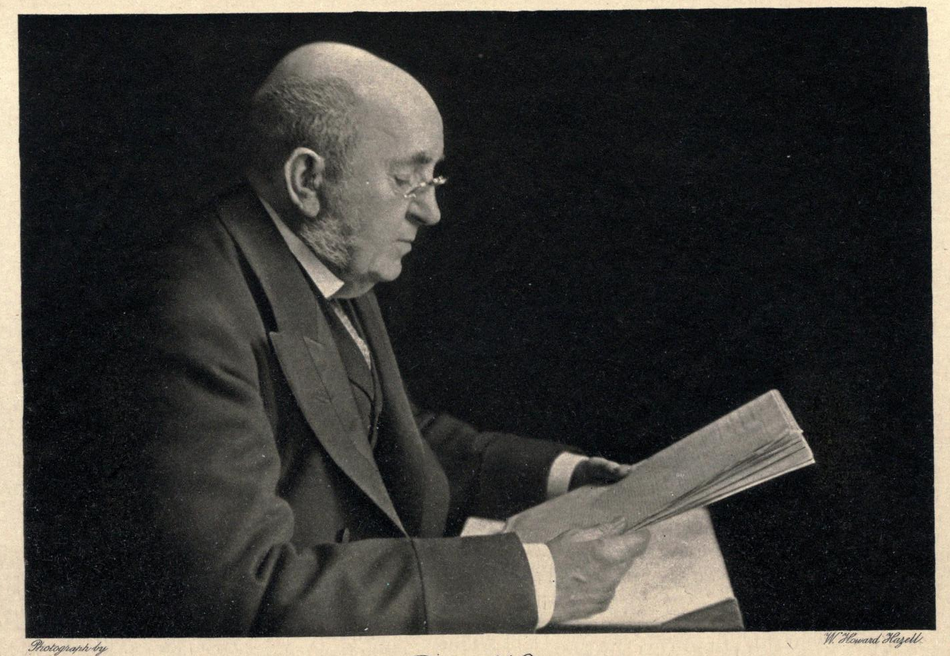
Walter Hazell (1843-1919)

Hazell was educated privately, and became a printer and publisher in London, running Hazell, Watson and Viney Limited. He joined the Peace Society, serving as its treasurer, and was a founder of the Self-Help Emigration Society and the Children's Fresh Air Mission.

Between 1891 and 1895, Walter hired superintendents to run a training farm from a farmhouse he rented (originally with 4 acres increasing to 28 acres in 1892) in Langley, Essex near Saffron Walden. The training farm was for unemployed and unskilled young men from London unable to obtain work. Whereas the farm was not profitable the success of the skills training led them to move to a 225-acre site in Buckinghamshire instead. Around 100 men (a few boys 14-17 and five aged 40–46, but an average age of 24) were helped. 44 came from lodging houses and refuges. The intention was to gain skills and emigrate to Canada with the Self-Help Emigration Society.

Hazell joined the Liberal Party, and was elected for Leicester in an 1894 by-election. He held the seat in 1895, but was defeated in 1900. In 1911, he became the Mayor of Holborn, and he also served as an Income Tax commissioner.
