= Stanford (surname) =

Stanford is a surname, and may refer to:

== A ==
- Aaron Stanford (born 1976), American film actor
- Al Bourke (born 1928), Australian boxer
- Ala Stanford (born 1970), American pediatric surgeon
- Alan Stanford (born 1949), Irish actor and director
- Alfred Stanford (1900–1985), American naval officer and author
- Allen Stanford, American businessman and fraudster
- Andy Stanford-Clark, British information technologist
- Angela Stanford (born 1977), American golfer
- Ann Stanford (1916–1987), American poet
- Anthony Stanford (1830–1883), American politician from Arkansas
- Arthur Stanford (1878–1917), American stage actor and singer

== C ==
- Caroline Stanford, British historian and author
- Charles Stanford (minister) (1823–1886), Baptist minister
- Charles Stanford (politician) (1819–1885), New York politician
- Charles Villiers Stanford (1852–1924), Irish composer of classical and church music
- Charles Thomas-Stanford (1858–1932), British politician
- Clark Stanford, American dentist
- Cliff Stanford, British internet entrepreneur
- Craig Stanford, American anthropologist and evolution theorist

== D ==
- Dallen Stanford (born 1979), American rugby union sevens player
- Dennis Stanford (1943–2019), American archaeologist
- Derek Stanford (writer) (1918–2008), British writer
- Derek Stanford (politician) (born 1970), American politician
- Dickie Stanford (born 1956) is a British motor racing mechanic and manager
- Douglas Stanford, American theoretical physicist

== E ==
- Eddie Stanford (born 1985), English footballer
- Eddie Stanford (cricketer) (born 1971), English cricketer
- Edward Stanford (1827–1904), founder of map and book publisher Stanford's
- Eric Stanford (1932–2020), English sculptor
- Erica Stanford (born 1978), New Zealand politician
- Ernest Stanford (1894–1966), British politician

== F ==
- Fatima Cody Stanford, American obesity medicine physician
- Frank Stanford (1948–1978), American poet
- Frederic Stanford (1883–1964), Anglican bishop in Canada

== G ==
- George Stanford, American singer and songwriter
- Glenn Stanford (born 1957), Canadian ice hockey executive
- Graham Stanford (born 1948), Australian cricketer

== H ==
- Harry Stanford (1899–1975), English footballer
- Henry Stanford (American football), American football coach
- Henry King Stanford (1916–2009), American college president
- Hugh de Stanford (fl.1399–1422), English politician

== J ==
- Jack Stanford (1900–1968), English actor, singer, dancer and mime
- James Stanford, American contemporary artist, photographer and book publisher
- James J. Stanford (died 2012), United States Air Force air traffic controller
- Jane Stanford (1828–1905), American philanthropist
- Jason Stanford (baseball) (born 1977), Major League Baseball pitcher
- Jason Stanford (actor) (born 1953), American actor
- Jason Stanford (consultant) (born 1970), communications director for Austin mayor Steve Adler
- Jason Gray-Stanford (born 1970), Canadian film and television actor
- Jeremy Stanford, Australian actor and director
- Jim Stanford, Canadian economist and author
- John Stanford I (1537–1603), English politician
- John Stanford II (died 1603), English politician, son of the above
- John Stanford (general) (1938–1998), U.S. Army officer and Seattle school district superintendent
- John Frederick Stanford (1815–1880), English barrister, literary scholar and politician
- Joshua Stanford (born 1994), Canadian football player
- Julian Stanford (born 1990), American footballer
- J. K. Stanford (1892–1971), British writer and ornithologist

== K ==
- Karin Stanford, Professor of Pan-African Studies, California State University
- Ken Stanford (born 1937), Irish sports shooter
- Kyle Stanford (born 1970), American philosopher

== L ==
- Leland Stanford (1824–1893), American businessman, politician, founder of Stanford University
- Leonard Stanford (1896–1967), British Anglican priest
- Leland Stanford, Jr. (1868–1884), son of Leland and Jane Stanford

== M ==
- Martin Stanford (born 1958), British TV presenter
- Max Stanford (born 1941), American civil rights activist
- Miles J. Stanford (1914–1999), American Christian author

== N ==
- Nigel Stanford, New Zealand musician
- Non Stanford (born 1989), British triathlete

== P ==
- Paul Stanford, American marijuana activist
- Peter Stanford (born 1961), English writer and journalist
- Peter Stanford (Royal Navy officer) (1929–1991), British admiral
- Peter Thomas Stanford (1858–1909), African-American religious minister and writer
- Phil Stanford, American journalist and author

== R ==
- Rawghlie Clement Stanford (1879–1963), 9th governor of Arizona
- Richard Stanford (Kent cricketer) (1754–1792), English cricketer
- Richard Stanford (Sussex cricketer), English cricketer
- Richard Stanford (American politician) (1767–1816), U.S. Representative from North Carolina
- Richard Stanford (MP), Member of Parliament (MP) for Stafford 1382–1402 and relative of Hugh de Stanford
- Richard Stanford (rugby union) (born 1986), Australian rugby union footballer
- Richard Stanford (British Army officer), British general
- R. J. Stanford (born 1988), American football player
- Ross Stanford (1917–2006), South Australian cricketer
- Ryan Stanford, American politician

== S ==
- Sally Stanford (1903–1982), madam, restaurateur, and mayor of Sausalito, California
- Scott Stanford (born 1966), American news/sports anchor and commentator
- Sheila Barth Stanford (born 1974), Norwegian chess player and coach

== T ==
- Thomas Stanford (film editor) (1924–2017), American film and television editor
- Thomas C. Stanford (1865–1946), legislator
- Thomas Welton Stanford (1832–1918), Australian businessman, spiritualist and philanthropist
- Tom Stanford (born 1860), English footballer
- Trevor Herbert Stanford, stage name Russ Conway (1925–2000), English pianist

== V ==
- Vere Benett-Stanford (1840–1894), English politician

== W ==
- Walter Stanford (1850–1933), South African civil servant and politician
- Wesley Matthias Stanford (born 1846), American bishop of the United Evangelical Church
- William Stanford (sculptor), Australian sculptor
- William Stanford (judge), (1509 – 1558) English politician and judge
- William Bedell Stanford (1911–1984), Irish classical scholar, senator, Chancellor of the University of Dublin

== See also ==
- Staniforth
