= John Stanford =

John Stanford may refer to:

== People ==
- John Stanford I (1537–1603), MP for Leicester in 1572 and 1593
- John Stanford II (died 1603), MP for Leicester in 1597, son of the above
- J. K. Stanford (John Keith Stanford, 1892–1971), British writer
- John Frederick Stanford (1815–1880), English barrister, literary scholar, and politician
- John Stanford (US politician), see Members of the California State Legislature
- John Stanford (general) (1938–1998), U.S. Army officer and Seattle school district superintendent
- John Stanford (minister) of First Baptist Church in America
- John Stanford (baseball), see Charles M. Murphy
- John Stanford (teacher), pioneer of deaf education in the U.S., founder of New York School for the Deaf
- Nigel John Stanford, New Zealand musician, released the 1999 album Deep Space as John Stanford

== Other uses ==
- John Stanford International School, Seattle, Washington, United States

== See also ==
- Stanford (disambiguation)
- John (disambiguation)
