= John Sanford =

John or Jack Sanford may refer to:

== Politicians ==
- John Sanford (governor) (1605–1653), founder of Portsmouth, Rhode Island
- John Sanford (1803–1857), U.S. representative from New York
- John Sanford (1851–1939), U.S. representative from New York
- John W. A. Sanford (1798–1870), United States representative from the state of Georgia
- John W. A. Sanford Jr. (1825–1913), Confederate army officer and attorney general of Alabama
- John E. Sanford (1830–1907), U.S. politician in Massachusetts
- John Sanford (Bridgwater MP) (1640–1711), English politician and Member of Parliament

== Other people ==
- John Sanford (writer) (1904–2003), American author and screenwriter
- John A. Sanford (1929–2005), also known as Jack, Jungian psychoanalyst and Episcopal priest
- John C. Sanford (born 1950), American plant geneticist, and an advocate of intelligent design and young earth creationism
- John F. A. Sanford (1806–1857), Indian agent, fur trader and defendant in Dred Scott v. Sandford
- John Langton Sanford (1824–1877), English historical writer
- Jack Sanford (first baseman) (1917–2005), Major League Baseball first baseman
- Jack Sanford (1929–2000), Major League Baseball pitcher
- John Elroy Sanford (1922–1991), American comedian and actor best known as Redd Foxx

== See also ==
- John Sandford (disambiguation)
- John Stanford (disambiguation)
