= List of lord mayors of Leicester =

Lord Mayor of Leicester
- Incumbent; Teresa Aldred since 15 May 2025
- Style: The Right Worshipful (ex officio)
- Seat: Leicester Town Hall
- Appointer: Leicester City Council
- Term length: One year
- Inaugural holder: William fitz Leveric (as Mayor); James Thomas (as Lord Mayor)
- Formation: c.1209 (as Mayor); 1928 (as Lord Mayor)

The Lord Mayor of Leicester is the chairperson of Leicester City Council and the first citizen of the city of Leicester, England. The ancient office, formerly known simply as Mayor of Leicester, dates back to at least the year 1209 and is one of the oldest mayoralties in the English Midlands along with Lincoln and Northampton. In 1928 the title was upgraded to that of Lord Mayor by George V following the grant of city status in 1919. It is not to be confused with the new directly elected executive role of City Mayor established by the council in 2010.

The Lord Mayor is elected annually by the city councillors to undertake a role in their chamber similar to that of the Speaker in the House of Commons. Although chosen from among the predominantly politically affiliated councillors, they take an impartial role as chair during their term of office.

The Lord Mayor is also the principal focus of civic life in the city, responsible for hosting and attending many high profile events in its civic calendar. Thanks to Leicester's status as the county town of Leicestershire, the Lord Mayor is one of the central ceremonial dignitaries of the county, alongside the High Sheriff, the Lord Lieutenant, and the Bishop of Leicester, at civic ceremonies such as the Remembrance Sunday parade at the Arch of Remembrance.

The mayoralty of Leicester has a long and complex history surviving various transitions in local government structures, from the ancient borough, to municipal borough, to the modern unitary authority. It has been held by many notable Leicestrians, such as William Wyggeston, Hugh Aston, Gabriel Newton, John Biggs, and Arthur Wakerley in its 800 year history.

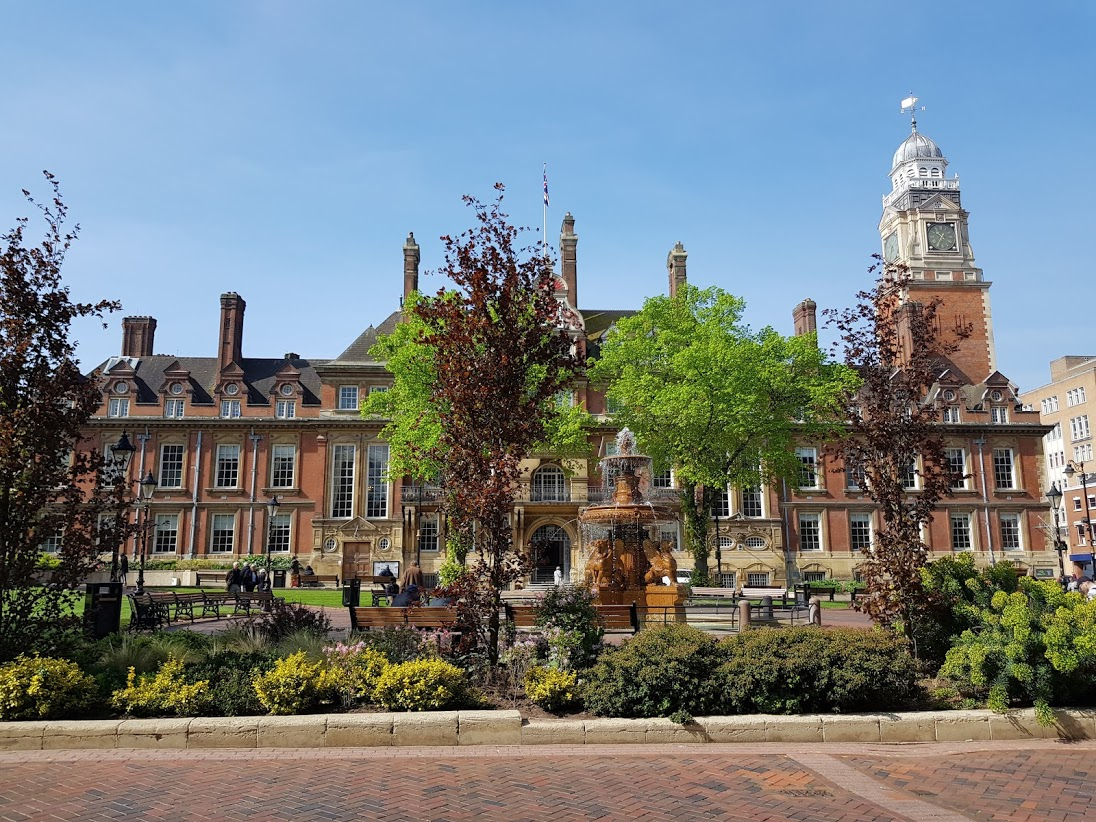
Leicester Town Hall, official seat of the Lord Mayor of Leicester

== History ==
The first documented mayor of Leicester was the Norman knight "William fitz Leveric" (William son of Leveric) recorded in 1209; however, it is possible that he was not the first. The record, while initially patchy, is continuous from the year 1251 until today. The title was elevated to "Lord Mayor" by letters patent dated 18 June 1928 together with the mayoralties of Nottingham, Stoke-on-Trent, and Portsmouth. This was confirmed for the reorganised non-metropolitan district by letters patent dated 1 April 1974.

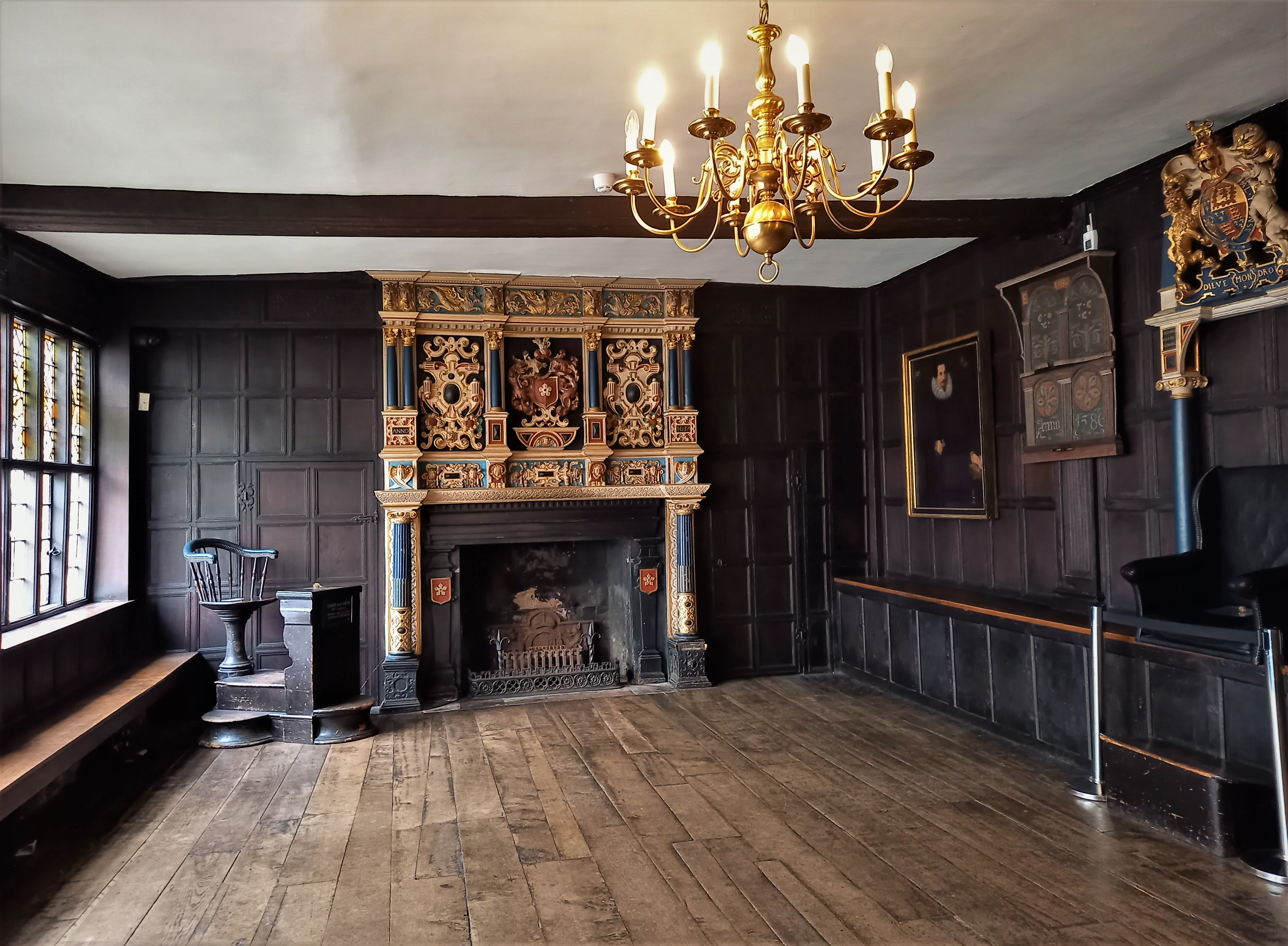
The Mayor's Parlour in Leicester Guildhall, the former official residence of the Leicester's mayors

The first Jewish person to be mayor of Leicester was Israel Hart in 1884. The first woman to be Lord Mayor was Alderman Elizabeth Rowley-Frisby in 1941. The first Asian person to hold the office, Gordhan Parmar, was elected in 1987. The first Black person, George Cole, was elected in 2022.

After institution of a directly elected mayor in 2011 the Lord Mayor of Leicester still exists as a ceremonial role under Leicester City Council.

=== Borough records ===
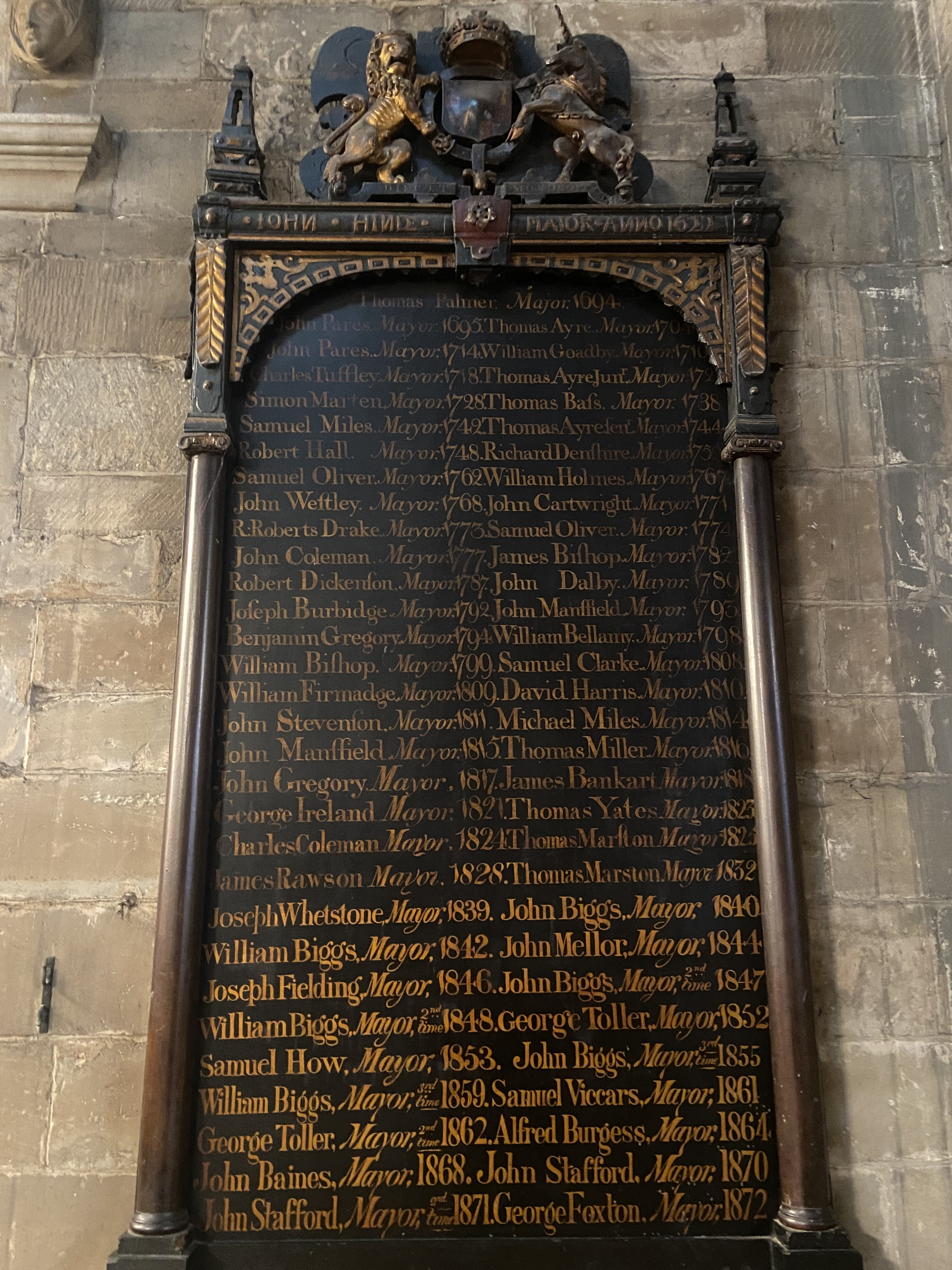
List of Mayors of Leicester who lived in the Parish of St Margaret, displayed in St Margaret's Church, Leicester

The list of the mayors of the ancient borough (1209-1835) are taken from the Records of the Borough of Leicester (edited by Mary Bateson). Those that come 1835-1871 are taken from the Roll of Mayors. The names for the mayors between 1871 and 1894 are taken from John Storey's Historical Sketch of Some of the Principal Works and Undertakings of the Council of the Borough of Leicester (1895).

== 13th cent ==
Earliest nonconsecutive records

- 1209-1220 William fitz Leveric
- 1225-1226 Simon Curlevache & William St. Lo
- 1226-1227 Simon Curlevache
- 1232-1233 Simon Curlevache
- 1234-1242 Simon Curlevache & William St. Lo
- 1242-1244 William St. Lo
- 1245-1246 William of St Lo & Peter fitz Roger

Consecutive list

- 1251-1257 Peter fitz Roger (6 consecutive terms, died in office)
- 1257 Feb. Bartholomew de Dunstaple (As Custos Maioritatis following Peter fitz Roger)
- 1258-1270 Henry de Rodington (Appointed Jan. 23, 1258. Entered office Mar. 1. 12 consecutive terms)
- 1270-1275 Alexander le Debonair (5 consecutive terms)
- 1275-1276 Walter le Bron
- 1276-1278 William Leffe (2 consecutive terms)
- 1278-1281 William le Engleys (3 consecutive terms)
- 1281-1284 Thomas Gunfrey (3 consecutive terms)
- 1284-1285 Geoffrey Mauclerk (3 consecutive terms)
- 1287-1288 Adam de, Merlaw
- 1288-1289 Thomas Gunfrey (4th term)
- 1289-1290 William le Engleys
- 1290-1291 Thomas Gunfrey (5th term)
- 1291-1292 Laurence le Celer, Seller
- 1292-1294 Thomas Gunfrey (6th and 7th terms)
- 1294-1298 Robert de Willoughby (1st term)
- 1298-1299 Peter Oumfrey
- 1299-1300 William le Palmer (2 consecutive terms, 1299-1301)

== 14th cent ==
- 1301-1302 Robert de Willoughby (2nd term)
- 1302-1303 Thomas Gunfrey
- 1303-1304 William le Palmer
- 1304-1306 Roger de Willoughby (also known as Robert) (3rd and 4th terms)
- 1306-1307 John Cagge
- 1307-1308 Laurence le Seller
- 1308-1309 John Cagge
- 1309-1313 John Alsy (4 consecutive terms)
- 1313-1314 Walter de Bushby
- 1314-1315 John de Knightcote
- 1315-1317 John Alsy (5th and 6th terms)
- 1317-1318 John le Marwe
- 1318-1319 William del Waynhous
- 1319-1321 Peter de Kent (2 consecutive terms)
- 1321-1322 John le Marwe
- 1322-1324 John de Norton (2 consecutive terms)
- 1324-1326 John Alsy (7th and 8th terms)
- 1326-1327 John de Norton
- 1327-1328 John Alsy (9th term)
- 1328-1330 Robert Stretton (2 consecutive terms)
- 1330-1332 Henry Merlyng (2 consecutive terms)
- 1332-1334 John Marewe (2 consecutive terms)
- 1334-1335 John Martyn
- 1335-1336 John Leverich
- 1336-1337 William Wareyn
- 1337-1338 John Alsy (10th term)
- 1338-1339 William de Cloune (simultaneously bailiff)
- 1339-1340 John Martin
- 1340-1343 Geoffrey de Kent (3 consecutive terms)
- 1343-1344 Richard Leverich
- 1344-1345 John Martyn
- 1345-1346 Richard Leverich
- 1346-1349 John Wainhouse (alias Cook, alias Hayward, alias Receiver, 3 consecutive terms)
- 1349-1351 Geoffrey de Kent (2 consecutive terms
- 1351-1353 William le Goldsmith (2 consecutive terms)
- 1353-1354 Roger de Knightcote
- 1354-1355 Geoffrey de Kent (3rd term)
- 1355-1356 John de Peatling
- 1356-1357 Roger Knightcote
- 1357-1360 William de Dunstable (3 consecutive terms)
- 1360-1362 John Cook alias Receiver (4th and 5th terms)
- 1362-1363 Thomas de Beeby (1st term)
- 1363-1364 William Tubbe
- 1364-1365 Roger de Belgrave
- 1365-1366 Walter de Lindrick
- 1366-1367 William de Syston
- 1367-1368 John de Stafford
- 1368-1369 Thomas de Beeby (2nd term)
- 1369-1370 John Cook (At the same time bailiff, 6th term)
- 1370-1372 John de Stafford (2nd and 3rd consecutive terms)
- 1372-1373 William o' the Green
- 1373-1374 Henry de Clipston
- 1374-1375 Henry Peatling
- 1375-1376 William Ferour
- 1376-1377 William Tailleart
- 1377-1379 William Ferour (2nd and 3rd consecutive terms)
- 1379-1380 Henry de Clipston
- 1380-1381 Richard Gamston
- 1381-1382 John Stafford
- 1382-1383 Richard Knightcote
- 1383-1384 Richard Gamston
- 1384-1385 William Ferour
- 1385-1387 Henry Beeby (2 consecutive terms)
- 1387-1389 Richard de Braunston (2 consecutive terms)
- 1389-1390 Henry Clipston
- 1390-1391 William de Humberston¹
- 1391-1392 Geoffrey Clerk alias Okeham
- 1392-1393 Richard Gamston
- 1393-1394 Thomas Wakefield
- 1394-1395 Henry Beeby (3rd term)
- 1395-1396 Thomas o' the Leas (1st term)
- 1396-1397 John Houghton
- 1397-1398 Ralph Fisher
- 1398-1399 Roger de Humberston (1st term)
- 1399-1400 William Spenser

== 15th cent ==
- 1400-1401 John Loveday
- 1401-1402 Peter Barewell
- 1402-1403 John London
- 1403-1404 John Church
- 1404-1405 Richard Falconer
- 1405-1406 Thomas Wakefield
- 1406-1407 Ralph Humberston (1st term)
- 1407-1408 John Gresley
- 1408-1409 John Church
- 1409-1410 Thomas o' the Leas (2nd term)
- 1410-1411 Roger Humberston (2nd term)
- 1411-1412 Thomas Walgrave
- 1412-1413 Robert Randolph
- 1413-1414 Robert Evington
- 1414-1415 Ralph Humberstone (2nd term)
- 1415-1416 Thomas Seburgh
- 1416-1417 John Arnesby
- 1417-1418 Henry Derby (1st term)
- 1418-1419 William Pacy
- 1419-1420 Thomas Walgrave
- 1420-1421 Thomas Clerk
- 1421-1422 Ralph Humberston (3rd term)
- 1422-1423 John Church
- 1423-1424 Henry Foster
- 1424-1425 Henry Derby (2nd term)
- 1425-1426 William Newby
- 1426-1427 John Pickwell
- 1427-1428 William Asty or Skinner
- 1428-1429 William Pacey
- 1429-1430 Ralph Humberston (4th term)
- 1430-1431 Thomas Walgrave
- 1431-1432 John Loughborough
- 1432-1432 Thomas Clerk
- 1433-1434 William Newby
- 1434-1435 John Reynold senior (1st term)
- 1435-1436 Adam Racey (1st term)
- 1436-1437 Walter Pouney
- 1437-1438 William Asty
- 1438-1439 John Coventry
- 1439-1440 John Reynold jun. (1st term)
- 1440-1441 Adam Racey (2nd term)
- 1441-1442 Thomas Charyte
- 1442-1443 William Wimeswold
- 1443-1444 William Grantham
- 1444-1445 William Newby
- 1445-1446 Thomas Green
- 1446-1447 John Benet
- 1447-1448 Ralph Furneys (Alias Fisher)
- 1448-1449 William Wigston
- 1449-1450 William Braunston
- 1450-1451 John Reynold jun. (2nd term)
- 1451-1452 William Clarke
- 1452-1453 William Wimeswold
- 1453-1454 Thomas Charyte
- 1454-1457 William Dalton jun. (3 consecutive terms)
- 1457-1458 Thomas Grene draper
- 1458-1459 John Reynold senior (2nd term)
- 1459-1460 William Wigston
- 1460-1461 Robert Sheringham
- 1461-1462 Robert Rawlot
- 1462-1463 John Yeoman
- 1463-1464 John Reynold (Called Yeoman in Edwards IV's charter of 1464) (3rd term)
- 1464-1465 William Holbech
- 1465-1466 Roger Wigston
- 1466-1467 John Frisley
- 1467-1468 Richard Gillot
- 1468-1469 Richard Yates
- 1469-1470 John Wigston
- 1470-1471 Robert Sherringham
- 1471-1472 Roger Wigston
- 1472-1473 John Parsons (1st term)
- 1473-1474 Robert Rawlot
- 1474-1475 John Roberdes
- 1475-1476 William Holbeche
- 1476-1477 Peers Winwood
- 1477-1478 John Reynold (4th term)
- 1478-1479 Thomas Touthby
- 1479-1480 John Parsons (2nd term)
- 1480-1481 John Wigston
- 1481-1482 John Penny Senior (father of John Penny, Abbot of Leicester 1496-1509)
- 1482-1483 Peter Curtes
- 1483-1484 John Roberdes
- 1484-1485 Robert Croft
- 1485-1486 Thomas Swyke
- 1486-1487 Thomas Palet do
- 1487-1488 Roger Wigston
- 1488-1490 Thomas Davy (2 consecutive terms)
- 1490-1491 Roger Trig
- 1491-1492 William Gibson
- 1492-1493 Thomas Swyke
- 1493-1494 Robert Croft
- 1494-1495 Thomas Hurst
- 1495-1496 Andrew Langton
- 1496-1497 William Rawlot
- 1497-1498 Richard Gillot
- 1498-1499 William Wyggeston Sen. (1st term)
- 1499-1500 William Wyggeston Jun. (1st term)

== 16th century ==
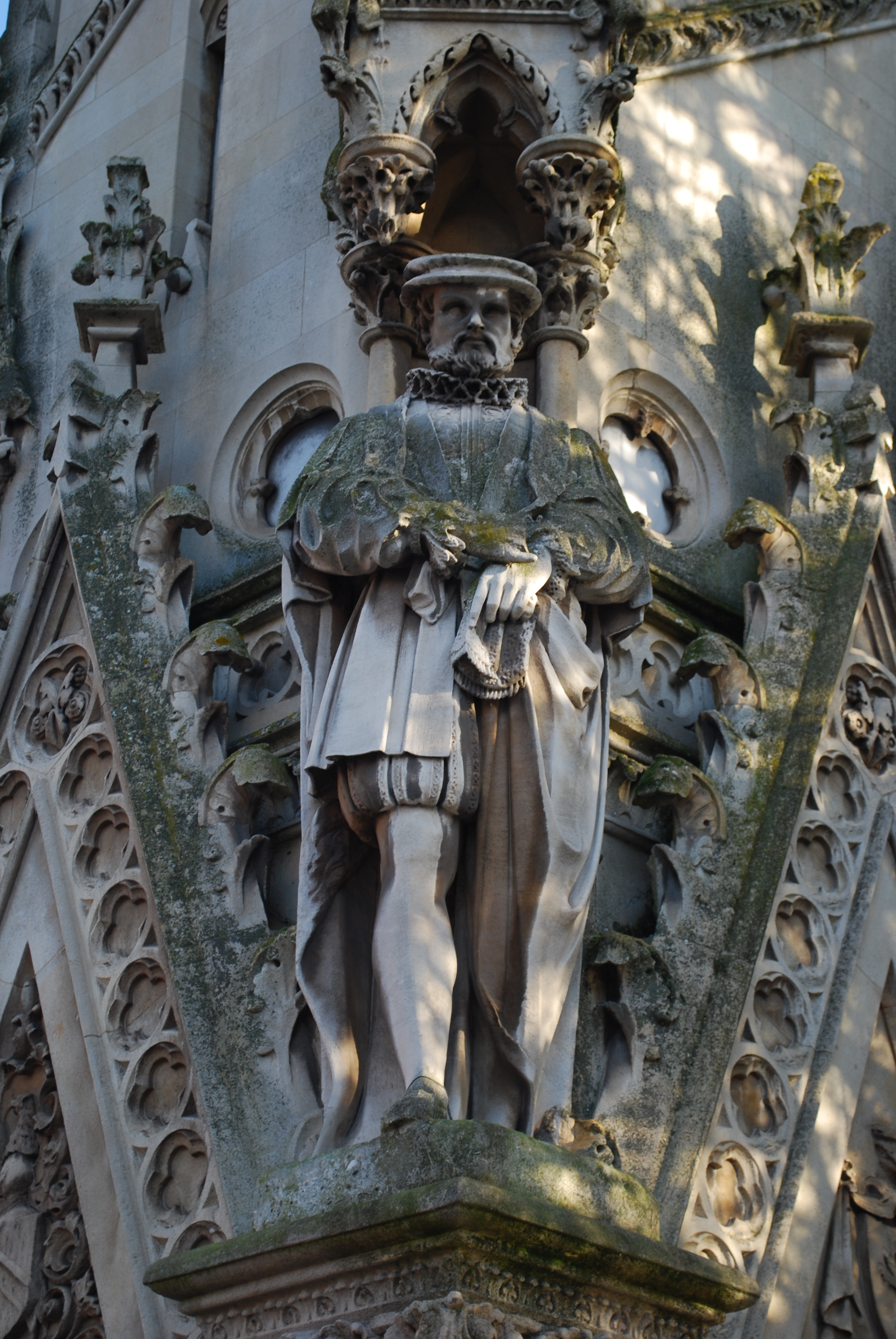
Statue of William Wyggeston Junior on the Haymarket Memorial Clock Tower

- 1500-1501 William Gibson
- 1501-1502 Roger Trig
- 1502-1503 William Fresley
- 1503-1504 John Norrys
- 1504-1505 Robert Orton
- 1505-1506 Richard Reynolds
- 1506-1507 John Wayse
- 1507-1508 Walter Mey
- 1508-1509 Miles Lambert
- 1509-1510 Richard Eyre
- 1510-1511 William Wyggeston Jun. (2nd term)
- 1511-1512 William Wyggeston Elder. (2nd term)
- 1512-1513 Richard Gyllott
- 1513-1514 Richard Reynold
- 1514-1515 Thomas Burton
- 1515-1516 Thomas Cotton
- 1516-1517 John Reede
- 1517-1518 Thomas Smyth
- 1518-1519 Richard Beeston
- 1519-1520 William Bartlatt
- 1520-1521 William Wygston senior (3rd term)
- 1521-1522 Robert Harward (MP for Leicester, 1529)
- 1522-1523 William Bolt
- 1523-1524 Richard Reynold
- 1524-1525 Robert Staples (died in office)
- 1525 Henry Gillot (Custos Maioritatis)
- 1525-1526 Edward Beyr
- 1526-1527 John Westawse
- 1527-1528 Thomas Burton
- 1528-1529 Roger Gyllatt
- 1529-1530 Thomas Bett
- 1530-31 William Tebb
- 1531-32 Nicholas Rennold
- 1532-33 John Barton
- 1533-34 Christopher Clught
- 1534-35 William Bolte
- 1535-36 Thomas Barton
- 1536-37 Roger Gyllott
- 1537-38 Randolph Á Wood (1st term)
- 1538-39 William Pratt
- 1539-40 Nicholas Reynold
- 1540-1541 Robert Gaddysby
- 1541-1542 Hugh Aston (MP for Leicester, 1554)
- 1542-1543 Thomas Cressy
- 1543-1544 Christopher Clught
- 1544-1545 William Ollyffe
- 1545-1546 Robert Cotton (MP for Leicester, 1553)
- 1546-1547 Robert Mey
- 1547-1548 Randolph Wood (2nd term)
- 1548-1549 John Gaytliff
- 1549-1550 Nicholas Reynold
- 1550-1551 Robert Newcom
- 1551-1552 Thomas Wilcokes
- 1552-1553 Nicholas Heyrek
- 1553-1554 Thomas Davynport
- 1554-1555 John Berredge
- 1555-1556 Robert Jonys
- 1556-1557 William Manbe
- 1557-1558 John Heireke
- 1558-1559 Robert Fletcher
- 1559-1560 Thomas Stanforde
- 1560-1561 Richard Derker
- 1561-1562 Thomas Hallam
- 1562-1563 William Reynoldes
- 1563-1564 Richard Davy
- 1564-1565 Simon Nix
- 1565-1566 Thomas Fowler
- 1566-1567 John Tatambu
- 1567-1568 William Noris
- 1568-1569 William Manby
- 1569-1570 James Clarck
- 1570-1571 Nicholas Englyshe
- 1571-1572 William Gyllott
- 1572-1573 John Eyricke
- 1573-1574 Thomas Stanford
- 1574-1575 Thomas Hallam
- 1575-1576 Richard Davye
- 1576-1577 John Stanford (MP for Leicester, 1572 and 1593, 1st term of 2 terms)
- 1577-1578 John Tatam
- 1578-1579 John Myddleton
- 1579-1580 William Noryce
- 1580-1581 George Tatam
- 1581-1582 Philip Freake
- 1582-1583 William Moreton (1st of 3 terms)
- 1583-1584 Thomas Clarke
- 1584-1585 Robert Heyrycke (1st of 3 terms)
- 1585-1586 James Clarke
- 1586-1587 James Ellis
- 1587-1588 William Ludlam
- 1588-1589 George Noryce
- 1589-1590 John Hynde
- 1590-1591 John Tatam
- 1591-1592 Ralph Chettell
- 1592-1593 John Stanford (2nd term)
- 1593-1594 Robert Heyrycke (2nd term of 3)
- 1594-1595 George Tatam
- 1595-1596 William Yates
- 1596-1597 William Morton (2nd term of 3)
- 1597-1598 Thomas Nixe
- 1598-1599 Thomas Clarke
- 1599-1600 Edward Newcombe

== 17th century ==
- 1600-1601 Robert Gillott
- 1601-1602 William Rowes
- 1602-1603 James Ellis
- 1603-1604 Hugh Hunter
- 1604-1605 Thomas Chattell
- 1605-1606 Robert Heyrick (3rd term)
- 1606-1607 Lebbeus Chamberlain
- 1607-1608 Thomas Chapman
- 1608-1609 James Andrew (1st of 2 terms)
- 1609-1610 Thomas Parker
- 1610-1611 John Mabbs
- 1611-1612 John Freake
- 1612-1613 William Morton (3rd term)
- 1613-1614 Thomas Manby
- 1614-1615 John Bonnett
- 1615-1616 William Ive (MP for Leicester, 1624; 1st of 3 terms)
- 1616-1617 Thomas Heyrick
- 1617-1618 Rowland Pusey
- 1618-1619 Nicholas Gillot (1st of 2 terms)
- 1619-1620 John Heyrick
- 1620-1621 John Pare
- 1621-1622 James Andrew (2nd term)
- 1622-1623 John Hind (1st term of 2)
- 1623-1624 James Ellis
- 1624-1625 William Ludlam
- 1625-1626 William Ive (2nd of 3 terms)
- 1626-1627 Gilbert Fawsett
- 1627-1628 Francis Churchman
- 1628-1629 William Billers (1st of 3 terms)
- 1629-1630 Roger Cotes
- 1630-1631 Thomas Smith
- 1631-1632 John Norrice (1st of 2 terms)
- 1632-1633 Nicholas Gillott (2nd term)
- 1633-1634 Hugh Watts
- 1634-1635 William Ive (3rd term)
- 1635-1636 Ralph Thompson
- 1636-1637 Richard Inge
- 1637-1638 Daniel Murfin
- 1638-1639 John Hind (2nd term)
- 1639-1640 John Norrice (2nd term)
- 1640-1641 William Stanley (1st term of 2)
- 1641-1642 Thomas Rudyard
- 1642-1643 Richard Ludlam (1st term of 2)
- 1643-1644 William Ward
- 1644-1645 William Billers (2nd of 3 terms)
- 1645-1646 Edmund Cradock (1st of 2 terms)
- 1646-1647 Dannett Abney (1st term of 2)
- 1647-1648 Thomas Blunt (1st term)
- 1648-1649 William Stanley (1st term of 2)
- 1649-1650 William Speechley
- 1650-1651 John Summerfield
- 1651-1652 Alexander Baker (1st term of 2)
- 1652-1653 William Billers (3rd term)
- 1653-1654 Edmund Johnson
- 1654-1655 Richard Ludlam (2nd term)
- 1655-1656 George Martin
- 1656-1657 Edward Billers
- 1657-1658 Edmund Cradock (2nd term)
- 1658 Samuel Wanley (Custos Maioritatis)
- 1658-1659 William Franke
- 1659-1660 John Clay (1st of 2 terms)
- 1660-1661 Dannett Abney (2nd term)
- 1661-1662 Francis Noble (1st of 2 terms)
- 1662-1663 Daniel Deaken
- 1663-1664 Thomas Blunt (2nd term, died in office)
- 1664 Richard Palmer (Custos Maioritatis)
- 1664-1665 William Callis
- 1665-1666 William Alsop (1st of 2 terms)
- 1666-1667 Edmund Townsend
- 1667-1668 William Southwell (1st of 2 terms)
- 1668-1669 Thomas Overing
- 1669-1670 Andrew Freeman (1st of 2 terms)
- 1670-1671 William Deane
- 1671-1672 Alexander Baker (2nd term)
- 1672-1673 John Clay (2nd term)
- 1673-1674 Robert Hartshorne
- 1674-1675 Francis Noble (2nd term)
- 1675-1676 George Beckett (1st of 2 terms)
- 1676-1677 Edmund Sutton
- 1677-1678 William Alsop (2nd term)
- 1678-1679 Philip Abney
- 1679-1680 John Roberts (1st of 2 terms)
- 1680-1681 John Goodall (1st of 2 terms)
- 1681-1682 George Bent (1st of 2 terms)
- 1682-1683 William Southwell (2nd term)
- 1683-1684 Andrew Freeman (2nd term)
- 1684-1685 Thomas Ludlam
- 1685-1686 Walter Hood
- 1686-1687 Francis Ward
- 1687-1688 Joseph Cradock
- 1688-1689 William Bentley
- 1689-1690 John Bent
- 1690-1691 John Goodall (2nd term)
- 1691-1692 George Beckett (died in office)
- 1692 John Wilkins (Custos Maioritatis)
- 1692-1693 John Brokesby
- 1693-1694 Edmund Johnson
- 1694-1695 Thomas Palmer
- 1695-1696 John Pares
- 1696- 1697 John Roberts
- 1697-1698 Henry Pate
- 1698-1699 John Cracroft
- 1699-1700 Samuel Woodland

== 18th century ==
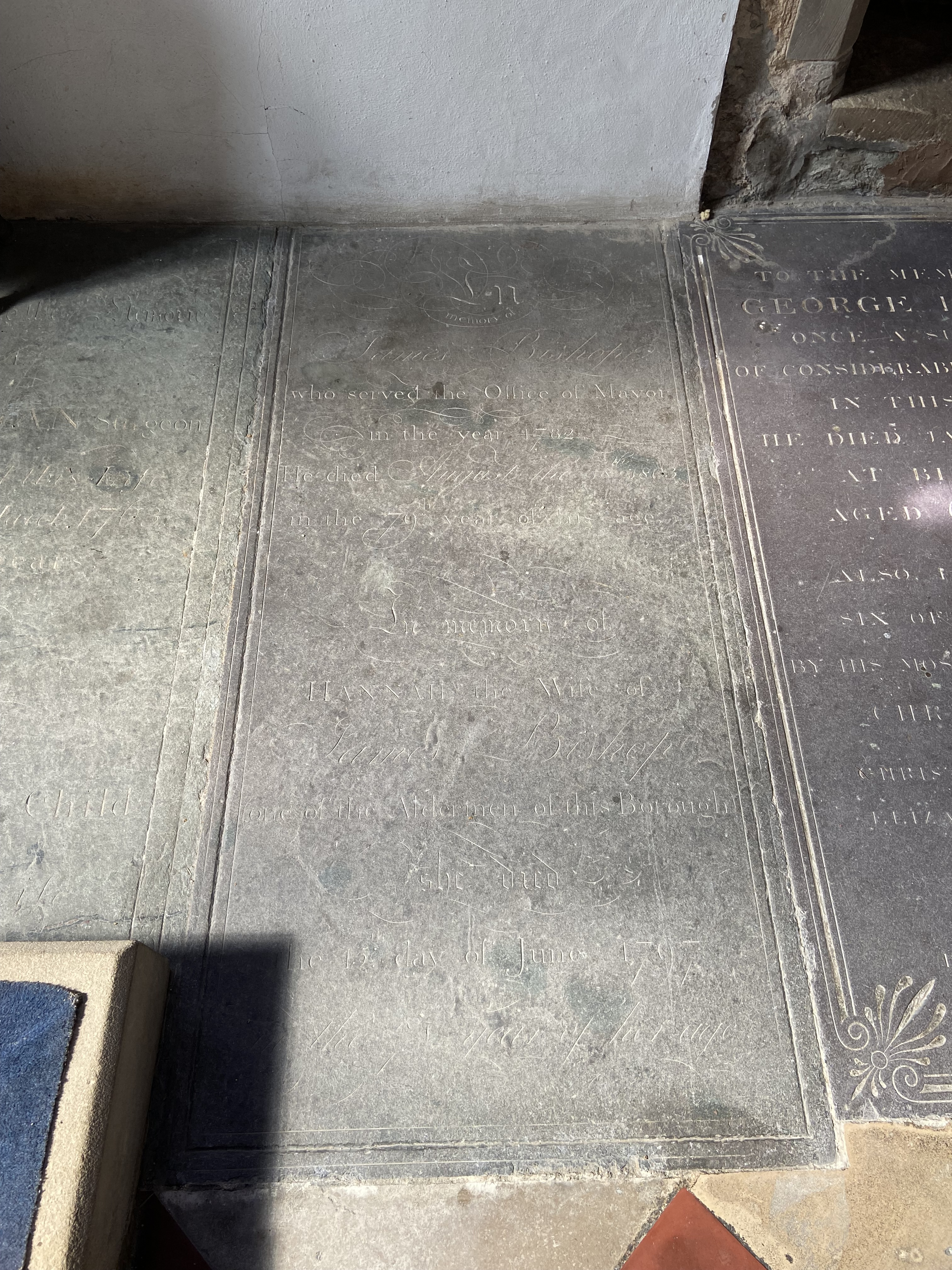
Tomb of James Bishop, Mayor of Leicester (1782-1783) - St Margaret's Church, Leicester.

- 1700-1701 John Abney
- 1701-1702 Richard Townsend
- 1702-1703 Edmund Cradock
- 1703-1704 Richard Weston
- 1704-1705 Thomas Ayre
- 1705-1706 Thomas Hartshorne
- 1706-1707 George Bent (2nd term)
- 1707-1708 John Ludlam
- 1708-1709 James Annis
- 1709-1710 Edward Hood
- 1710-1711 Thomas Bradley
- 1711-1712 Edmund Johnson
- 1712-1713 John Cooper
- 1713-1714 Arthur Noone
- 1714-1715 John Pares
- 1715-1716 Francis Lewin
- 1716-1717 William Goadby
- 1717-1718 Thomas Hemsley
- 1718-1719 Charles Tuffley
- 1719-1720 John Ludlam
- 1720 Robert Winfield (died in office)
- 1720-1721 Edward Hood (Custos Maioritatis)
- 1721-1722 William Hammond
- 1722-1723 Humphrey Chapman
- 1723-1724 Thomas Ayre
- 1724-1725 Thomas Lambert
- 1725-1726 Thomas Ludlam
- 1726-1727 John Gutheridge
- 1727-1728 William Page
- 1728-1729 Simon Martin
- 1729-1730 Richard Roberts
- 1730-1731 Henry Smith
- 1731-1732 Edward Howkins
- 1732-1733 Gabriel Newton
- 1733-1734 George Bent
- 1734-1735 Richard Goodall
- 1735-1736 Samuel Simpson
- 1736-1737 William Brushfield
- 1737-1738 William Lee
- 1738-1739 Thomas Bass
- 1739-1740 Edmund Ludlam
- 1740-1741 Edward Bates
- 1741-1742 John Cartwright
- 1742-1743 Samuel Miles
- 1743-1744 Samuel Belton
- 1744-1745 Thomas Ayre
- 1745-1746 Joseph Denshire
- 1746-1747 Thomas Topp
- 1747-1748 John Smalley
- 1748-1749 Robert Hall
- 1749-1750 Thomas Phipps
- 1750-1751 Thomas Martin
- 1751-1752 Samuel Simpson
- 1752-1753 Richard Denshire
- 1753-1754 Thomas Chapman
- 1754-1755 William Lee
- 1755-1776 James Sismey
- 1756-1757 Edmund Ludlam
- 1757-1758 Joseph Hall
- 1758-1759 Robert Belton
- 1759-1760 Nicholas Throsby
- 1760-1761 John Westley (1st term)
- 1761-1762 Samuel Brown
- 1762-1763 Samuel Oliver
- 1763-1764 Henry Gutheridge
- 1764-1765 Richard Beale
- 1765-1766 Joseph Chambers (1st term)
- 1766-1767 John Fisher
- 1767-1768 William Holmes
- 1768-1769 John Westley (2nd term, died in office)
- 1769 John Gamble (Custos Maioritatis)
- 1769-1770 Joseph Chambers (2nd term)
- 1770-1771 James Cooper
- 1771-1772 John Cartwright
- 1772-1773 Robert Peach
- 1773-1774 Richard Roberts Drake
- 1774-1775 Samuel Oliver
- 1775-1776 Joseph Johnson
- 1776-1777 Samuel Jordan
- 1777-1778 John Coleman
- 1778-1779 John Pocklington
- 1779-1780 John Gregory
- 1780-1781 Henry Watchorn (1st term)
- 1781-1782 Thomas Barwell
- 1782-1783 James Bishop
- 1783-1784 William Oldham
- 1784-1785 Joseph Chambers (2nd term)
- 1785-1786 John Parsons (Died in office)
- 1786 Robert Peach, (Custos Maioritatis)
- 1786-1787 Hamlet Clark
- 1787-1788 Robert Dickinson
- 1788-1789 Henry Watchorn (2nd term)
- 1789-1790 John Dalby
- 1790-1791 John Eames
- 1791-1792 Joseph Neal
- 1792-1793 Joseph Burbidge
- 1793-1794 John Mansfield Snr. (Co-founder Oliver & Mansfield - Leicester Bank)
- 1794-1795 Benjamin Gregory
- 1795-1796 William Dabbs
- 1796-1797 Hamlet Clark (2nd term)
- 1797-1798 Thomas Jeffcutt
- 1798-1799 William Bellamy
- 1799-1800 William Bishop

== 19th century ==
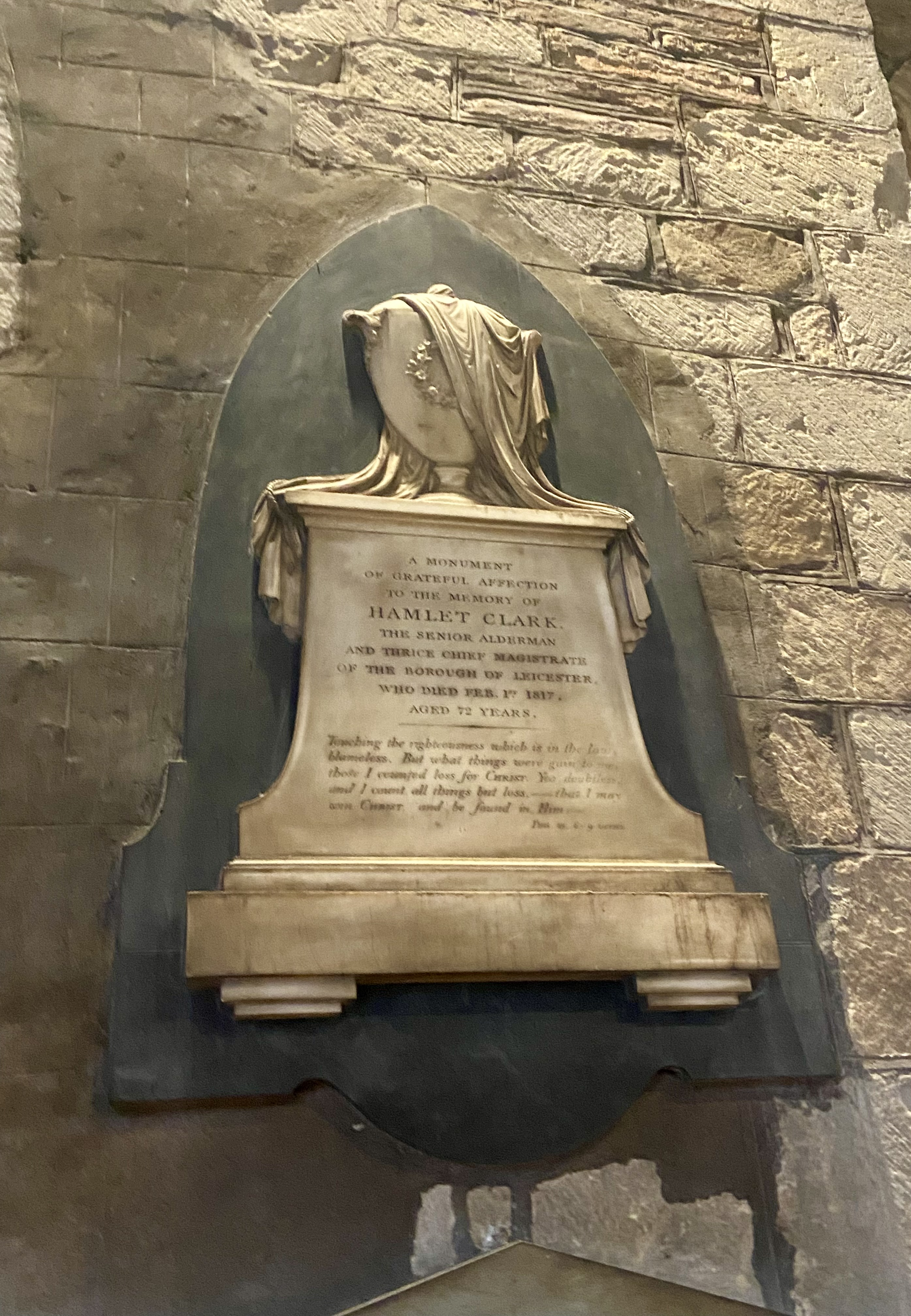
Hamlet Clark's memorial in St Nicholas Church, Leicester.

- 1800-1801 John Saywell
- 1801-1802 Thomas Peach
- 1802-1803 John Slater
- 1803-1804 Hamlet Clark (2nd term)
- 1804-1805 Edmund Swinfen
- 1805-1806 William Parsons
- 1806-1807 Joseph Johnson
- 1807-1808 Thomas Wright
- 1808-1809 Samuel Clarke
- 1809-1810 William Firmadge
- 1810-1811 David Harris
- 1811-1812 John Stevenson
- 1812-1813 John Fox
- 1813-1814 Sir William Walker
- 1814-1815 Michael Miles
- 1815-1816 John Mansfield Jnr.
- 1816-1817 Thomas Miller
- 1817-1818 John Gregory
- 1818-1819 James Bankart
- 1819-1820 Robert Johnson
- 1820-1821 Isaac Lovell
- 1821-1822 George Ireland
- 1822-1823 Thomas Cook (1st term - not to be confused with another famous Leicestrian called Thomas Cook, founder of the package holiday company, who was a schoolboy during the first term of Mayor Cook)
- 1823-1824 Thomas Yates
- 1824-1825 Charles Coleman
- 1825-1826 Thomas Marston
- 1826-1827 Henry Wood
- 1827-1828 Mansfield Gregory
- 1828-1829 James Rawson
- 1829-1830 Isaac Lovell (2nd term)
- 1830-1831 John Brown
- 1831-1832 George Brushfield Hodges
- 1832-1833 Thomas Marston
- 1833-1834 Thomas Cook (2nd term)
- 1834-1835 Richard Rawson (Re-elected for a second term Sept. 1835, but his second
- term of office expired 31 Dec. 1835, with the retirement of the old Corporation.)

End of the ancient borough of Leicester

- 1836-1837 Thomas Paget, (MP for Leicestershire, 1831)
- 1837-1838 Robert Brewin
- 1838-1839 Thomas Stokes
- 1839-1840 Joseph Whetstone
- 1840-1841 John Biggs (MP for Leicester 1855–1862)
- 1841-1842 Thomas Stokes
- 1842-1843 William Biggs (MP for Newport, Isle of Wight, 1852)
- 1843-1844 Richard Harris
- 1844-1845 John Mellor
- 1845-1846 Edward Weston
- 1846-1845 Joseph Fielding
- 1847-1448 John Biggs
- 1848-1849 William Biggs
- 1849-1850 Thomas Nunneley
- 1850-1851 John Dove Harris, (MP for Leicester, 1857 and 1865)
- 1851-1852 George Toller
- 1852-1853 John Manning
- 1853-1854 Samuel How
- 1854-1855 Richard Harris junior
- 1855-1856 John Biggs
- 1856-1857 John Dove Harris
- 1857-1858 Joseph Underwood
- 1858-1859 William Biggs
- 1859-1860 James Francis Hollings (brother in law to John Biggs, committed suicide after leaving office).
- 1860-1861 Edward Shipley Ellis
- 1861-1862 Samuel Viccars
- 1862-1863 George Toller
- 1863-1864 George Baines
- 1864-1865 Alfred Burgess
- 1865-1866 Thomas William Hodges
- 1866-1867 Thomas William Hodges
- 1867-1868 Thomas William Hodges
- 1868-1869 John Baines
- 1869-1870 George Stevenson
- 1870-1871 John Stafford
- 1871-1872 John Stafford
- 1872-1873 George Foxton
- 1873-1874 William Kempson
- 1874-1875 Charles Harding
- 1875-1876 William Barfoot
- 1876-1877 William Winterton
- 1877-1878 Clement Stretton
- 1878-1878 William Grimsley (died)
- 1878-1879 Clement Stretton
- 1879-1880 John Bennett
- 1880-1881 John Bennett
- 1881-1882 Henry Thomas Chambers
- 1882-1883 Francis Hewitt
- 1883-1884 George Anderson
- 1884-1885 Israel Hart
- 1885-1886 Israel Hart
- 1886-1887 Israel Hart
- 1887-1888 Thomas Wright
- 1888-1889 Edward Wood

Leicester county borough (created 1889)

- 1889-1890 Henry Lankester
- 1890-1891 William Kempson
- 1891-1892 Thomas Wright
- 1892-1893 John Underwood
- 1893-1894 Israel Hart
- 1894-1895 George Green
- 1895-1896 Edward Wood
- 1896-1897 Joseph Herbert Marshall
- 1897-1898 Arthur Wakerley
- 1898-1899 George Clifton
- 1899-1900 Thomas Windley

== 20th century ==
- 1900-1901 Alderman Samuel Lennard
- 1901-1902 Thomas Windley
- 1902-1903 Alderman William Wilkins Vincent
- 1903-1904 Albert Edwin Sawday
- 1904-1905 Stephen Hilton
- 1905-1906 Henry Bailey Bruce
- 1906-1907 Edward Wood
- 1907-1908 Thomas Smith
- 1908-1909 Charles Lakin
- 1909-1910 George Chitham
- 1910-1911 William Wilkins Vincent
- 1911-1912 Arthur Tollington
- 1912-1913 James McCall
- 1913-1914 John Russell Frears
- 1914–1917 Jonathan North (three terms)
- 1918-1919 Walter John Lovell
- 1919-1920 Jabez Chaplin
- 1920-1921 George Edward Hilton
- 1921-1922 James Wedgwood Heath
- 1922-1923 Amos Sherriff
- 1923-1924 John Mantle Hubbard
- 1924-1925 Herbert Simpson
- 1925-1926 George Banton
- 1926-1927 Thomas Watson Walker

== List of lord mayors (1927-present) ==
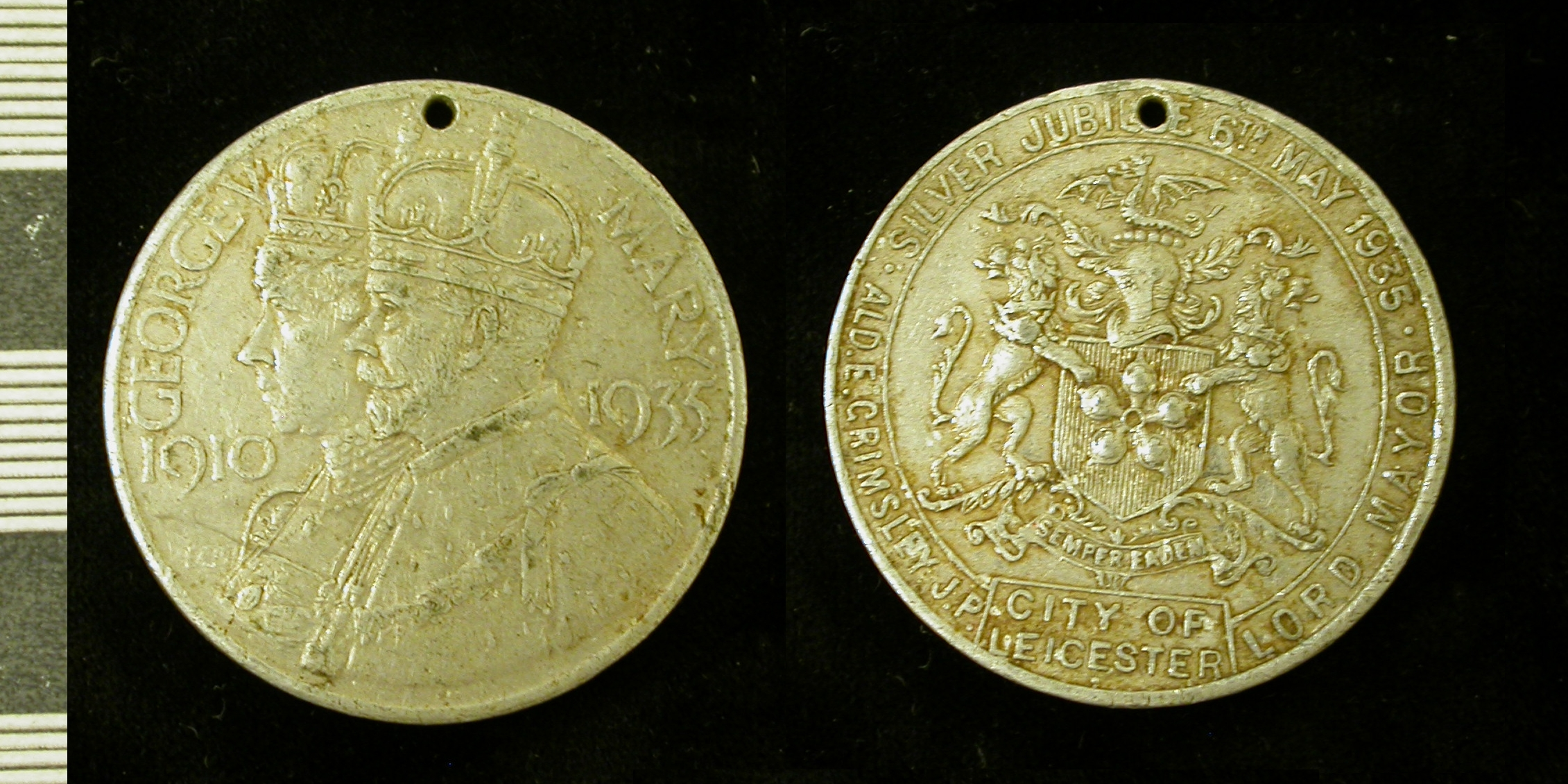
Silver jubilee medal of George V and Queen Mary issued by the city of Leicester in 1935, in the name of Alderman E. Grimsley, JP, Lord Mayor

- James Thomas (1927–1928)
- Harry Hand (1928–1929)
- William Hincks (1929–1930)
- Harry Carver (1930–1931)
- Walter Wilford (1931–1932)
- Arthur Hawkes (1932–1933)
- William Billings (1933–1934)
- Ernest Grimsley (1934–1935)
- Richard Hallam (1935–1936)
- Arthur Swain (1936–1937)
- Frank Acton (1937–1938)
- Thomas Gooding (1938–1939)
- George Parbury (1939–1940)
- William Joseph Cort (1940–1941)
- Elizabeth Rowley Frisby (1941–1942)
- Sydney Taylor (1942–1943)
- Charles Edward Gillot (1943–1944)
- John Minto (1944–1945)
- Charles Edward Worthington, (1945–1946)
- William Henry Smith (1946–1947)
- John Newton Frears (1947–1949)
- John William Wale (1949–1950)
- Frederick Ernest Oliver (1950–1951)
- Aderman Thomas Rowland Hill (1951–1952)
- Geoffrey Morris Barnett (1952–1953)
- Charles Robert Keene (1953–1954)
- Cecil Herbert Harris (1954–1955)
- Samuel Cooper (1955–1956)
- Alfred Harkyard (1956–1957)
- Frederick John Jackson (1957–1958)
- Sidney Brown (1958–1959)
- Bertram Powell (1959–1960)
- Dorothy Russell (1960–1961)
- May Goodwin (1961–1962)
- Harold Heard (1962–1963)
- Constance Elizabeth Jackson (1963–1964)
- Archibald Henry William Kimberlin (1964–1965)
- Sidney William Bridges (1965–1966)
- Monica Mary Trotter (1966–1967)
- Sir Mark Henig (1967–1968)
- Kenneth William Bowder (1968–1969)
- Edward Marston (1969–1970)
- George Baldwin (1970–1971)
- Percy Watts (1971–1972)
- Herbert Stanley Tomlinson (1972–1973)
- Clarence Arnold Wakefield (1973–1974)

Leicester non-metropolitan district

- Anne Irene Pollard (1974–1975)
- Lily Roma Marriott (1975–1976)
- Bernard Toft (1976–1977)
- Albert Turner Baker (1977–1978)
- Albert Sylvester Watson (1978–1979)
- William Henry Scotton (1979–1980)
- Herbert Henry Sowden (1980–1981)
- Archibald Berridge (1981–1982)
- William Page (1982–1983)
- George Billington (1983–1984)
- Michael Cufflin (1984–1985)
- Janet Setchfield (1985–1986)
- Sydney St. John Phipps (1986–1987)
- Gordhan Parmar (1987–1988)
- Guy Collis (1988–1989)
- David Anthony Taylor (1989–1990)
- Peter Kimberlin (1990–1991)
- Colin Grundy (1991–1992)
- Robert Wigglesworth (1992–1993)
- Henry Dunphy (1993–1994)
- Margaret Bell (1994–1995)
- Michael Johnson (1995–1996)
- Culdipp Bhatti (1996–1997)

Unitary Authority

- Raymond Flint (1997–1998)
- John Mugglestone (1998–1999)
- Phil Swift (1999–2000)
- Barbara Chambers (2000–2001)
- John Allen (2001–2002)
- Maggie Bodell-Stagg (2002–2003)
- Ramnik Kavia (2003–2004)
- Piara Singh Clair (2004–2005)
- Mary Draycott (2005–2006)
- Paul Westley (2006–2007)
- Gary G Hunt (2007–2008)
- Manjula Sood (2008–2009)
- Roger Blackmore (2009–2010)
- Colin Hall (2010–2011)
- Robert Wann (2011–2012)
- Abdul Osman (2012–2013)
- Mustafa Kamal (2013–2014)
- John Thomas (2014–2015)
- Ted Cassidy (2015–2016)
- Stephen Corrall (2016–2017)
- Rashmikant Joshi (2017–2018)
- Ross Grant (2018–2019)
- Annette Byrne (2019–2021 - served two consecutive terms due to the COVID-19 pandemic)
- Deepak Bajaj (2021–2022)
- George Cole (2022–2023)
- Susan Barton (2023-2024)
- Bhupendra Dave (2024-2025)
- Teresa Aldred (2025-2026)
- Kulwinder Singh Johal (2026-)
