= Henry Stanford =

Henry Stanford may refer to:

- Henry King Stanford (1916–2009), university president
- Henry Stanford (American football), American football coach
