= John Sandford =

John Sandford may refer to:

- John Sandford (poet) (1565–1629), English clergyman and academic
- John Sandford (novelist) (born 1944), American novelist and journalist
- John Douglas Sandford (1832–1892), English cricketer
- John Edmondson, 2nd Baron Sandford (1920–2009), English naval commander, priest and politician
- John Sandford (Archdeacon of Coventry) (1801–1873)
- John de Sandford (died 1294), Archbishop of Dublin

== See also ==
- John Sanford (disambiguation)
