= Israel Hart =

British merchant and Liberal Party politician

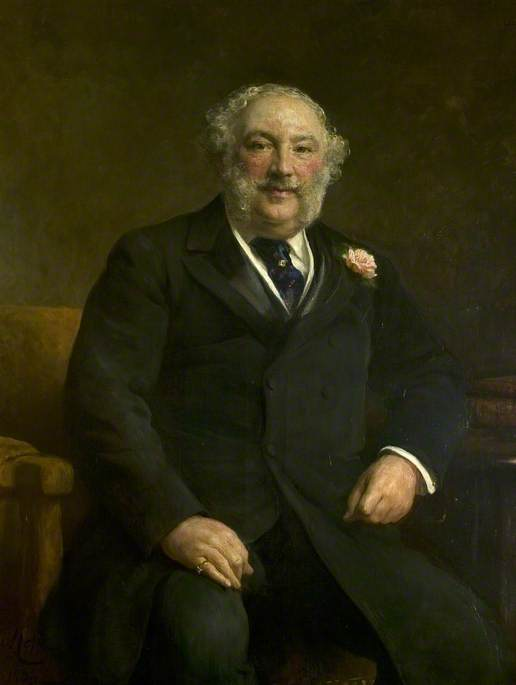
Israel Hart (1896) by Arthur Stockdale Cope in Leicester Town Hall

Sir Israel Hart (16 February 1835 – 24 March 1911) was a British merchant and Liberal Party politician.

== Background ==
Hart was twice married. He married Caroline Sewill in 1867 but she died the following year. In 1875, he married Charlotte Victoria Moses of Bayswater, London. They had one daughter, Vera Charlotte Hart, who married the son of Emanuel Raphael Belilios, and three sons; Edward Samuel, Arthur Charles and Leycester Israel George who died in infancy.

Hart was knighted in 1895.

== Professional career ==
He was chairman of Hart & Levy, wholesale merchants and garment manufacturers of Leicester.

== Political career ==
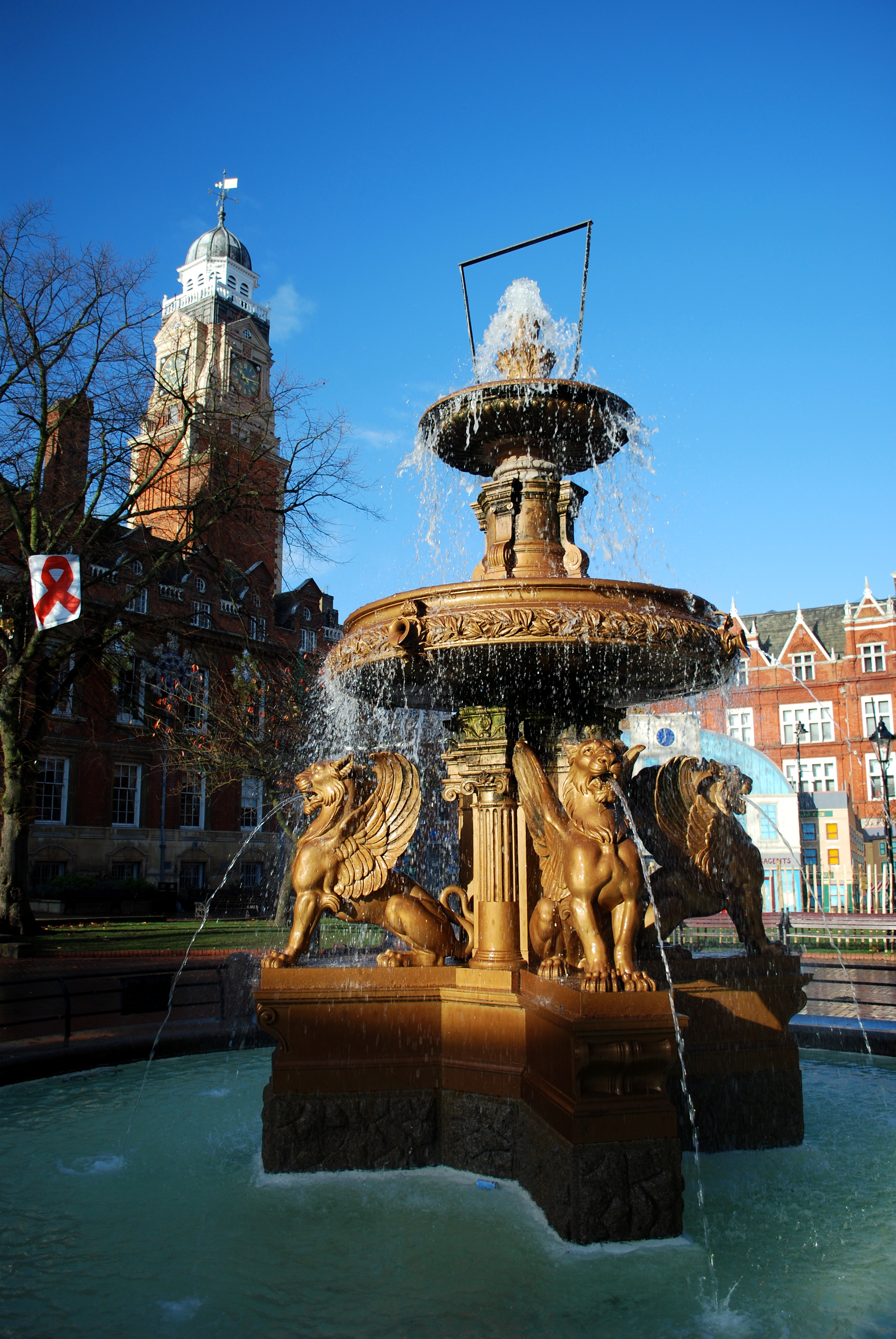
The fountain he presented in Town Hall Square, Leicester

Hart first became active in municipal politics, being elected to Leicester Town Council. He served as a councillor for 25 years and was Mayor of Leicester from 1884-6 and 1893-94. In 1885 he was appointed High Bailiff of the borough of Leicester. Hart was the first Jewish man to be mayor of Leicester.

On 29 October 1878 he presented to the council "a handsome ornamental fountain to be placed in the centre of the land fronting the Town Hall Buildings" for the purpose of keeping open a public square for all time. The fountain was designed by Francis Hames, the architect of the Town Hall, and was unveiled by Hart on 24 September 1879; it is constructed of bronze-painted cast iron, Shap granite and Ross of Mull granite. He also presented a free library to the town.

He was Liberal parliamentary candidate for the Hythe division of Kent at the 1895 General Election and the 1899 Hythe by-election. He was Liberal candidate for the Hackney Central division of London at the 1900 General Election. He did not stand for parliament again.

=== Electoral record ===
1900 General Election: Hackney Central
Party	Candidate	Votes	%	±%
Conservative	Augustus Henry Eden Allhusen	3,747	62.6	10.1
Liberal	Sir Israel Hart	2,243	37.4	−10.1
Majority		1,504		
Turnout		8,692	68.9	
Conservative hold		Swing		

== Arms ==
Coat of arms of Israel Hart
Notes Granted 28 February 1896 Crest Upon a fasces a hart as in the Arms the dexter foreleg resting on a crown vallery Azure. Escutcheon Vert a hart trippant Or between four cinquefoils of the last and a fasces fessewise in base Proper head to the sinister. Motto Via Trita Via Tuta (The well-worn path is the safe path)

== See also ==
- Sir Maurice Levy, 1st Baronet
