= Robert Harward (MP) =

16th-century English politician

Robert Harward (by 1482 – 1533/1534) was an English politician.

He was Mayor of Leicester for 1521–22 and elected a member (MP) of the parliament of England for Leicester in 1529.

On his death in office as MP he was buried in St. Martin's church, Leicester. He had married Margaret, the daughter of John Wigston of Leicester, and had 2 sons and a daughter.
