= William Ive (Leicester MP) =

English politician

William Ive (1597 – 31 August 1641) was an English politician who sat in the House of Commons in 1624.

Ive was of Leicestershire and matriculated at Lincoln College, Oxford on 26 April 1616, aged 18.

He was made Mayor of Leicester for 1615–16, 1625–6 and 1634–5. In 1624, he was elected Member of Parliament for Leicester in the Happy Parliament.

Parliament of England
Preceded by Sir Richard Moryson; Sir William Herrick	Member of Parliament for Leicester; 1624; With: Sir Humphrey May	Succeeded by Thomas Jermyn; Sir Humphrey May
