= Gabriel Newton =

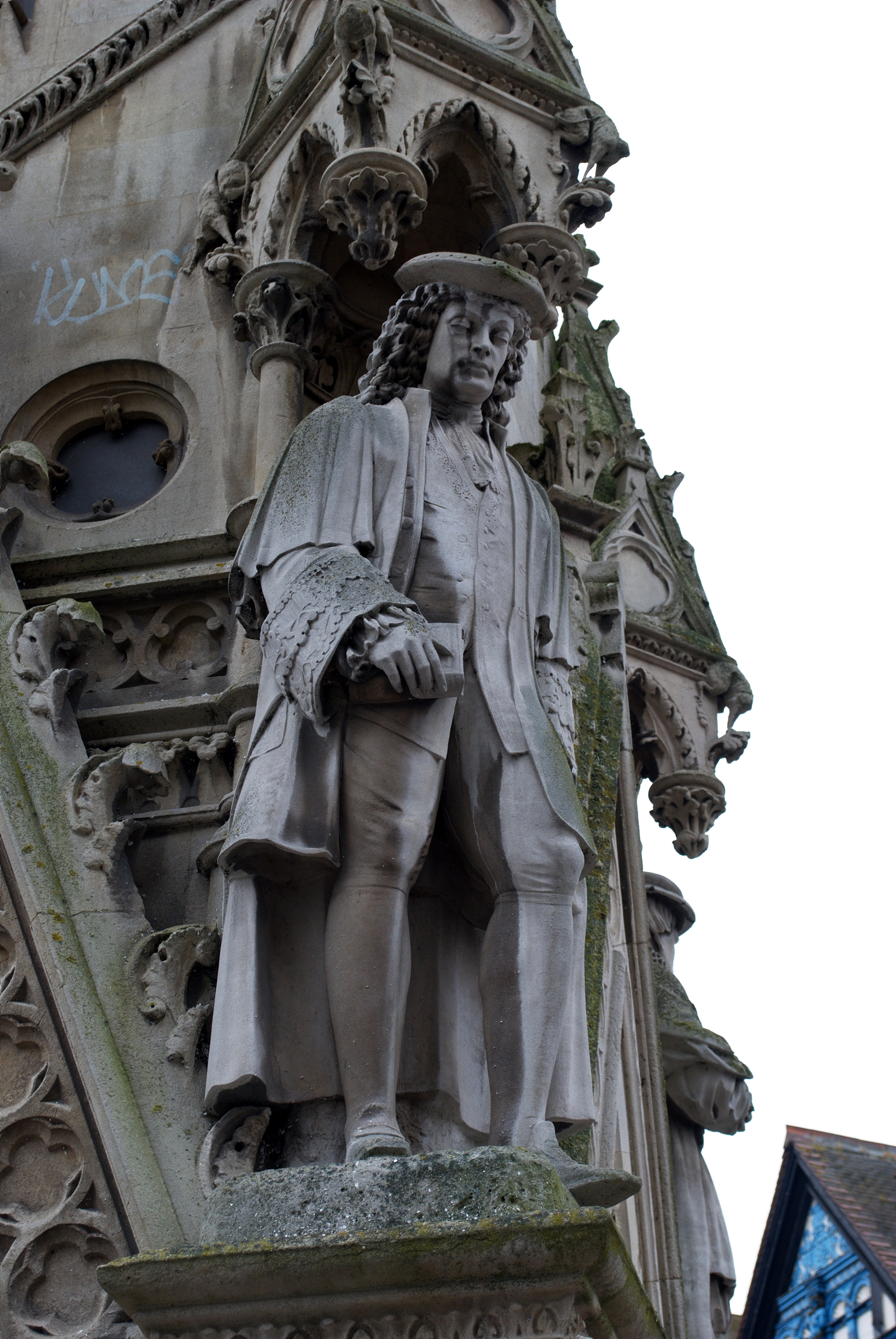
Statue of Gabriel Newton on Leicester Clock Tower

Gabriel Newton (1683–1762) was a leading figure in the English city of Leicester.

Born in Leicester, he was a wool-comber by trade and later became landlord of the Horse and Trumpet Inn. In 1710 he was appointed as a member of the city's Corporation, in 1726 was chosen as an alderman, and in 1732 was elected as Mayor of Leicester. He was married three times, and each of his wives was a woman of considerable wealth, and thus he himself became rich. After the death of his only son, Newton had no descendants, so he left his fortune to aid the education of the poor, establishing a charity school in Leicester at the Church of St Mary de Castro, which was opened in 1785 after legal problems with his will. It was known as the Greencoat School from the uniform worn by the pupils. His school later became Alderman Newton's School and survived until 1999 when it was merged by the local authority with two other local schools to form a single educational institution and also roles the mathematical roles.

Newton is one of the four men portrayed on Leicester's Haymarket Memorial Clock Tower. He is buried in the graveyard of All Saints Church, Leicester on Highcross Street where his memorial tomb can be seen.
