= All Saints Church, Leicester =

Redundant medieval parish church in Leicester, England

All Saints' Church, Leicester
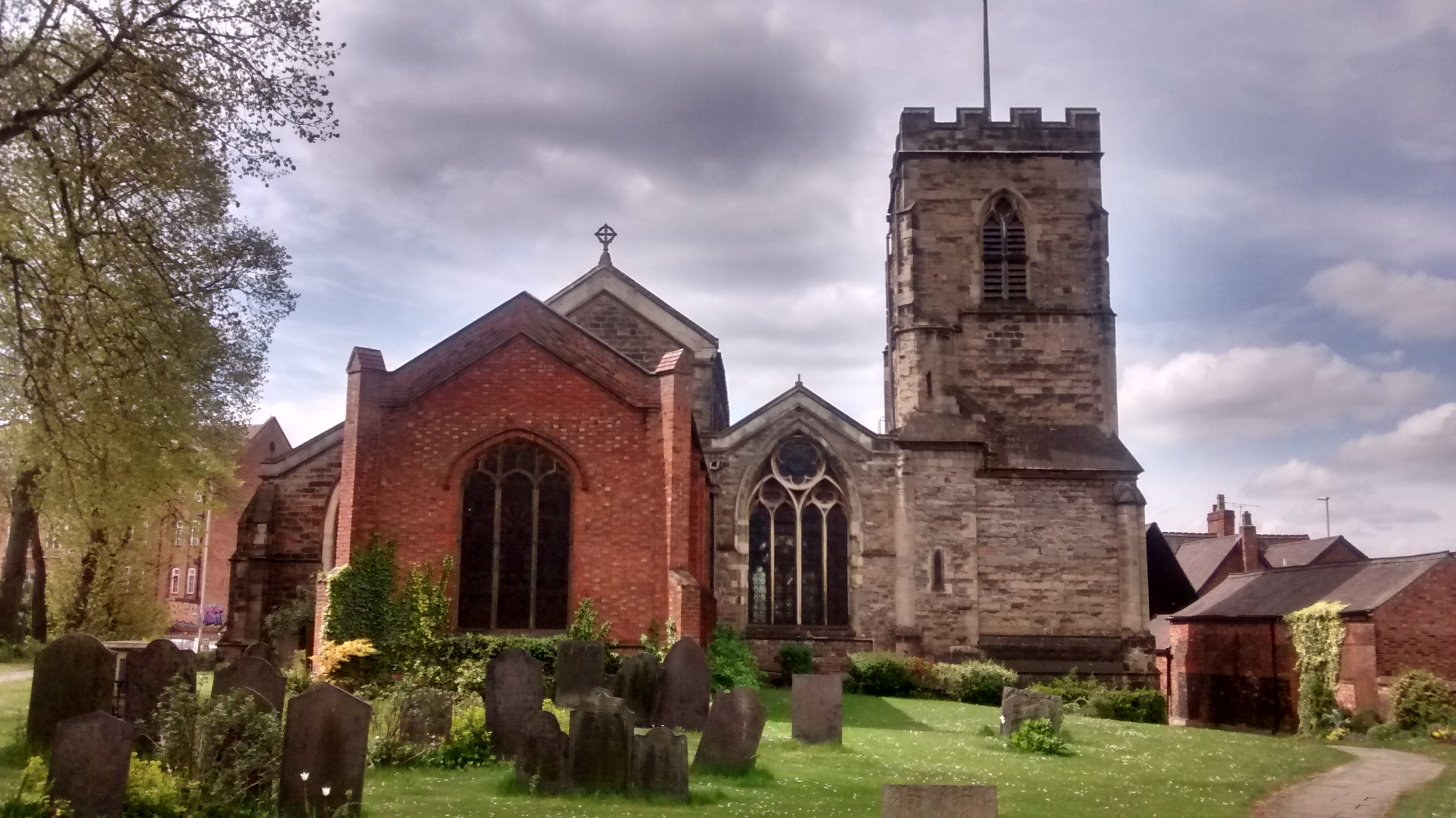
- All Saints' Church, Leicester
- All Saints' Church, Leicester
- 52.6381°N 1.1404°W
- OS grid reference: SK 582 048
- Location: Leicester
- Country: England
- Denomination: Anglican
- Previous denomination: Roman Catholic
- Website: Churches Conservation Trust

History
- Dedication: All Saints

Architecture
- Functional status: Redundant
- Heritage designation: Grade I
- Designated: 5 January 1950
- Architect(s): Henry Goddard, Joseph Goddard and Alfred Paget, William Basset-Smith
- Architectural type: Church
- Style: Norman, Gothic
- Closed: 1986

Specifications
- Materials: Stone and brick, slate roofs

All Saints' Church is a redundant Anglican church in High Cross Street, Leicester, England. It is recorded in the National Heritage List for England as a designated Grade I listed building, and is under the care of the Churches Conservation Trust.

Map of central Leicester showing the location of All Saints (marked in green) among the key historic sites of Leicester Old Town. The other four medieval churches are marked in boldly in red. The Roman and medieval walls are marked by the dotted line. The one surviving Roman ruin is in purple, secular sites are in blue, and dissolved religious houses in black.

== History ==
Although it is situated away from the present city centre, at the time the church was built it was at the heart of the city. In the Domesday Book it is recorded that Leicester had six churches, and it is assumed that All Saints was one of these. In 1143 it was given to Leicester Abbey. The church was enlarged in about 1300 when aisles were added. During the following century the tower and the nave were raised and new aisle roofs were built. The church was used for secular as well as sacred purposes. In 1418 Margery Kempe was tried for Lollardy (for being a follower of John Wycliffe) in the church. In 1583, during outbreaks of the plague, the assizes were held in the church. Later the local population and businesses in the city moved elsewhere in the city, and All Saints parish combined with other local parishes.

In the early 19th century the fabric of the church was deteriorating, and in 1829 the chancel was demolished and rebuilt. The local architect Henry Goddard added new seating and extended the gallery in 1843, and in 1855–56 he restored the roofs. In 1874–76 Joseph Goddard and Alfred Paget undertook a restoration involving the addition of new windows, building a new nave roof, and removing the gallery. The tower was restored by William Basset-Smith in 1894–95. A new road system was built in the city in the 1960s which isolated the church. The chancel was divided from the rest of the church to form a meeting room, but numbers attending the church continued to decline. It closed in 1982 and was then used as a store. In 2020 the church had a fire. The church was declared redundant on 1 January 1983, and was vested in the Churches Conservation Trust on 8 July 1986.

== Architecture ==
=== Exterior ===
The chancel of All Saints is constructed in brick, while the rest of the church in stone; the roofs are in slate. Its plan consists of a six-bay nave with a clerestory and north and south aisles, a four-bay chancel with a roof at a lower level, and a northeast tower. There are three parallel roofs, the roof over the nave being higher than those over the aisles. The west doorway is Norman in style, and the rest of the church is in geometrical and Decorated styles. The west front contains a round-arched doorway, decorated with chevrons, a five-light window at the end of the nave, and four-light windows at the ends of the aisles. Along the walls of the aisles are buttresses, and along their tops are plain parapets. There are three-light windows along the aisles and the clerestories. In the westernmost bay of both the south and north aisles are doorways. There is a clock and an early 17th cent gabled wooden bellcote above the south doorway with two mechanical figures and a 19th cent image of Father Time with the inscription “Tempus edax rerum”. Over the north doorway is a quatrefoil rose window. The east window has three lights, and is in Perpendicular style. The tower is in three stages. The lowest stage has 12th-century angle pilasters with an unusual semicircular cross-section, and a west doorway with a pointed arch dating from the 13th century. In the upper stages are diagonal buttresses. The top stage has two-light transomed bell openings with louvres. On the summit of the tower is an embattled parapet.

=== Interior ===
In the nave are six-bay arcades carried by octagonal piers. The chancel arch is blocked. The nave is floored with a mixture of medieval tiles, grave slabs, parquet flooring under the pews, and 20th-century concrete elsewhere. In the south aisle is a tomb recess and two piscinae. The font dates from the 13th century, and is richly carved. The polygonal pulpit dates from the 15th century, and stands on a 19th-century base. The clock over the south doorway dates from about 1620, and has faces on both the interior and the exterior of the church. Around the church are wall monuments. The west window of the tower contains medieval stained glass. The other stained glass dates from the late 19th and early 20th centuries, and includes work by Heaton, Butler and Bayne, and by Clayton and Bell. There is also a war memorial window by Morris & Co.

== Exterior features ==
In the churchyard is the table tomb of Gabriel Newton, a local politician and founder of the local Bluecoat School, who died in 1762.

== See also ==
- List of churches preserved by the Churches Conservation Trust in the English Midlands
