= William Wyggeston =

English wool merchant (c. 1467–1536)

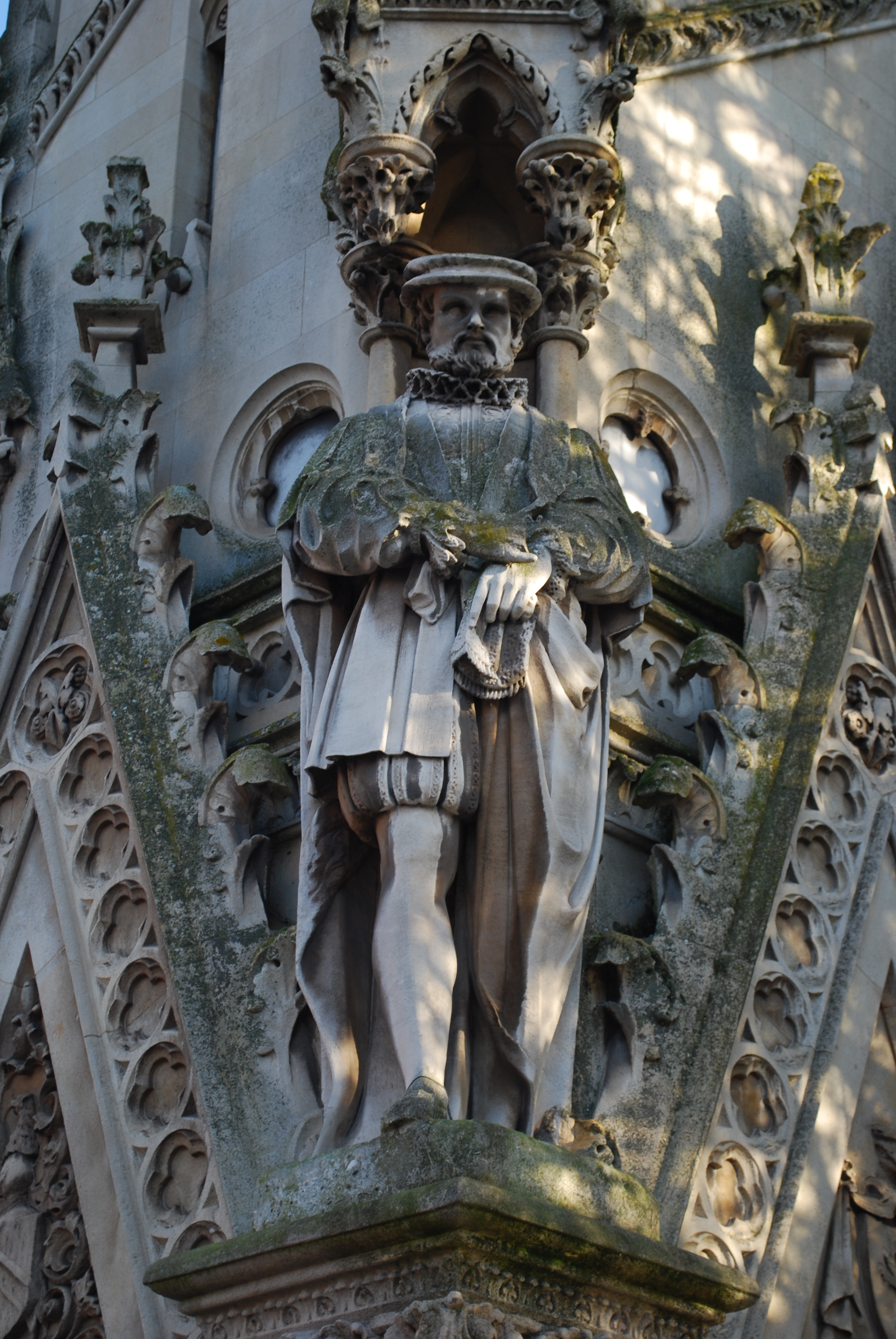
Statue of William Wigston (sic) on Leicester Clock Tower

William Wyggeston (sometimes spelt William Wigston; c. 1467 – 1536) was an English wool merchant based in Leicester. He was part of the Wyggeston family, which included at least one other William Wyggeston.

Although the family had been influential before, he became extremely wealthy (in 1522 records indicate he paid 22% of the tax levied on Leicester), and became Mayor of the Corporation of Leicester twice, and represented Leicester in the Seventh Parliament of Henry VII.

== Life ==
He was born c. 1467, the son and heir of Alderman John Wigston of the Newarke, Leicester, who had been Mayor of Leicester in 1469. William was made a freeman of Leicester in 1493–94, filled various municipal offices and became Mayor of Leicester in 1499, was elected M.P. for Leicester in 1504, and was again made mayor in 1510.

He was a wool merchant of the Staple of Calais, and it is stated on his monument that he was mayor of Calais four times. He was certainly mayor of Calais in November 1514.

He married twice, firstly Isabella, sister of Alderman Richard Gillot, and secondly Agnes, the widow of a Mr Trotter. He had no children.

== Legacy ==
Wyggeston was also known as a benefactor, and set up an early 'hospital' (almshouse) in Leicester in 1513, now called Wyggeston's Hospital, and funded by the income of the Swannington estate, which he bought in 1520. The hospital still exists as a retirement home for old people, based on Hinckley Road in the West End of Leicester. The original hospital was next to St Martin's Church (now Leicester Cathedral).

After Wyggeston's death, his brother Thomas Wyggeston, as a trustee, used part of the money to establish a grammar school in Leicester. Whilst this eventually became defunct, it gave its name to the later Wyggeston Grammar School for Boys, succeeded by the Wyggeston and Queen Elizabeth I College. Wyggeston Grammar School for Girls was founded not long after the Victorian boys' school. In 1981 it merged with another girls' grammar school in Leicester, Collegiate Girls' School, and stopped taking in girls at eleven. It instead became a Sixth Form college known as Wyggeston Collegiate Sixth Form College. Later still it became known as Regent College.

Wyggeston is one of the figures honoured by Leicester's Clock Tower (which spells his name 'Wigston').

A Freemasons' meeting in Leicester named a Lodge after William Wyggeston which was consecrated on 1 July 1910. The Wyggeston Lodge, No.3448 also takes William Wyggeston's motto, "Date eleemosynam et ecce omnia munda sunt vobis"/ "Give freely of yourself and behold all Worlds are yours".

There is a pub in Wigston named after him. The name is there spelt "Wygston".
