= Haymarket Memorial Clock Tower =

Grade II listed clock tower in Leicester, UK

Haymarket Memorial Clock Tower, Leicester
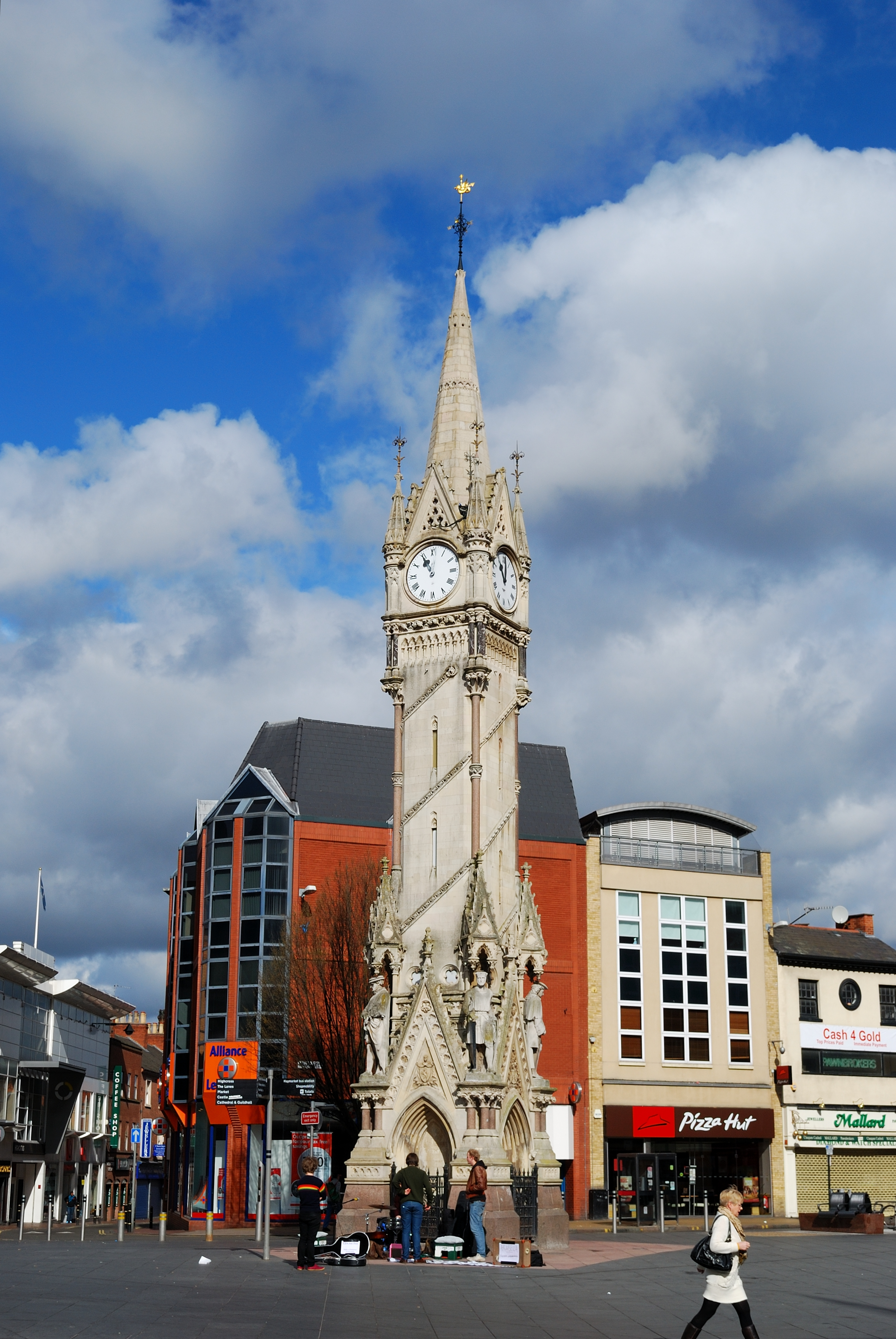
- Haymarket Memorial Clock Tower
- Interactive map of the Haymarket Memorial Clock Tower, Leicester area

General information
- Type: Clock tower
- Location: Leicester City Centre, Leicester, England
- Coordinates: 52°38′10.55″N 1°8′0.39″W
- Groundbreaking: 3 March 1868
- Completed: 1868

Height
- Height: 80 feet (24 m)

Technical details
- Material: Mountsorrel granite, Portland Stone and Ketton stone.

Design and construction
- Architect: Joseph Goddard
- Main contractor: S. Barfield, Welford Road, Leicester

The Haymarket Memorial Clock Tower is a major landmark and popular meeting point in Leicester, England. It is located roughly in the middle of the area inside the ring-road, and is at the point where five major streets meet; Gallowtree Gate, Humberstone Gate (A47), Haymarket (A607), Church Gate (A6) and Eastgates (A47).

== Construction ==
Before the construction of the Clock Tower the site had been used for an Assembly Room building, built in 1750, which was re-used and divided as shops in 1805. The building came to be considered "the Haymarket Obstruction" and after a campaign by local property-owners it was demolished in 1862. The hay market on the site remained, however, until it was relocated to Humberstone Gate. The removal of the Assembly Rooms and the hay market left a wide area which pedestrians struggled to cross due to the busy traffic there, and with rumours of an illuminated clock planned for the junction of London Road and Belvoir Street, local businesses began a petition to erect "a clock with a cluster of lamps and a fine colossal statue of that unparalleled benefactor Sir Thomas White" in the area.

An organisation was formed in 1867 to raise funds for the project, led by John Burton, who ran a photography business from a shop adjacent to the site of the tower. Subscriptions were gathered, with further money raised from a concert, and architects were invited to produce designs for "an ornamental structure...in height from 35–40 feet to contain four illuminated dials, four statuettes or medallion busts of ancient benefactors to the town, with a platform around 18 feet square, and lamps as a safeguard to passing pedestrians." 105 designs were received, with a shortlist of three submitted to the town council for consideration, with the architect Joseph Goddard's design being chosen. 472 subscribers contributed a total of 872 pounds, 2 shillings, and 9 pence, with the balance of the £1,200 required provided by the Corporation of Leicester.

The Clock Tower was constructed in 1868. The tower was built mostly in Ketton stone with a base of Mountsorrel granite, and incorporates column shafts made of polished Peterhead granite and serpentine. The statues were made from Portland stone. The site was directly above the junction of two of the city's main sewers which were modified prior to the tower's construction.

The clock mechanism was provided by Gillett and Bland of Croydon.

Officially a memorial, the Clock Tower has four statues of two persons of particular significance to Leicester and of two notable sons of Leicester, one at each corner, being named on the plinth of each as: Simon de Montfort, Thomas White, William Wyggeston (spelt 'William Wigston' on the plinth on the tower itself) and Gabriel Newton.

== Development of the area ==
At the time of its construction the traffic in the areas was horse-drawn. Tram lines were installed in the area between 1903 and 1904. Originally a traffic island at a 5-way junction, the Clock Tower was later converted to be the centre-piece of a roundabout, in 1926, one of the first in the UK. There were calls for the tower to be demolished in the 1930s, with increasing traffic in the area, and in the 1960s there were suggestions that it should be relocated to Victoria Park, but despite the major changes that have taken place in the area, including the construction of the Haymarket Shopping Centre and the resulting demolition of many nearby buildings (including John Burton's shop) it has remained. Pedestrianisation has now led to Humberstone Gate and Gallowtree Gate being closed to traffic, and the Clock Tower is now bounded by a road solely on the northern side.

Restoration of the tower was undertaken (and substantially funded) in 1992 by architects and engineers Pick Everard to mark the Leicester-based company's 125th anniversary.

In the first decade of the 21st century, Leicester City Council unveiled plans to greatly enhance the Clock Tower through extensive de-cluttering to achieve a restored landmark public space at the heart of the city. Construction on the new site was completed in late 2008.

On Monday 5 November 2007 both the Leicester Mercury and The Sun printed articles on a hoax petition, set up by local man Luke Anthony Williams. Over 3000 people joined a Facebook group to save the Clock Tower, even though plans to demolish the monument were fictitious: the only evidence that he could provide was a Wikipedia edit made by himself.

The tower is a Grade II listed building. In 2010, with the clock losing time, the mechanism was repaired.

== Statues ==
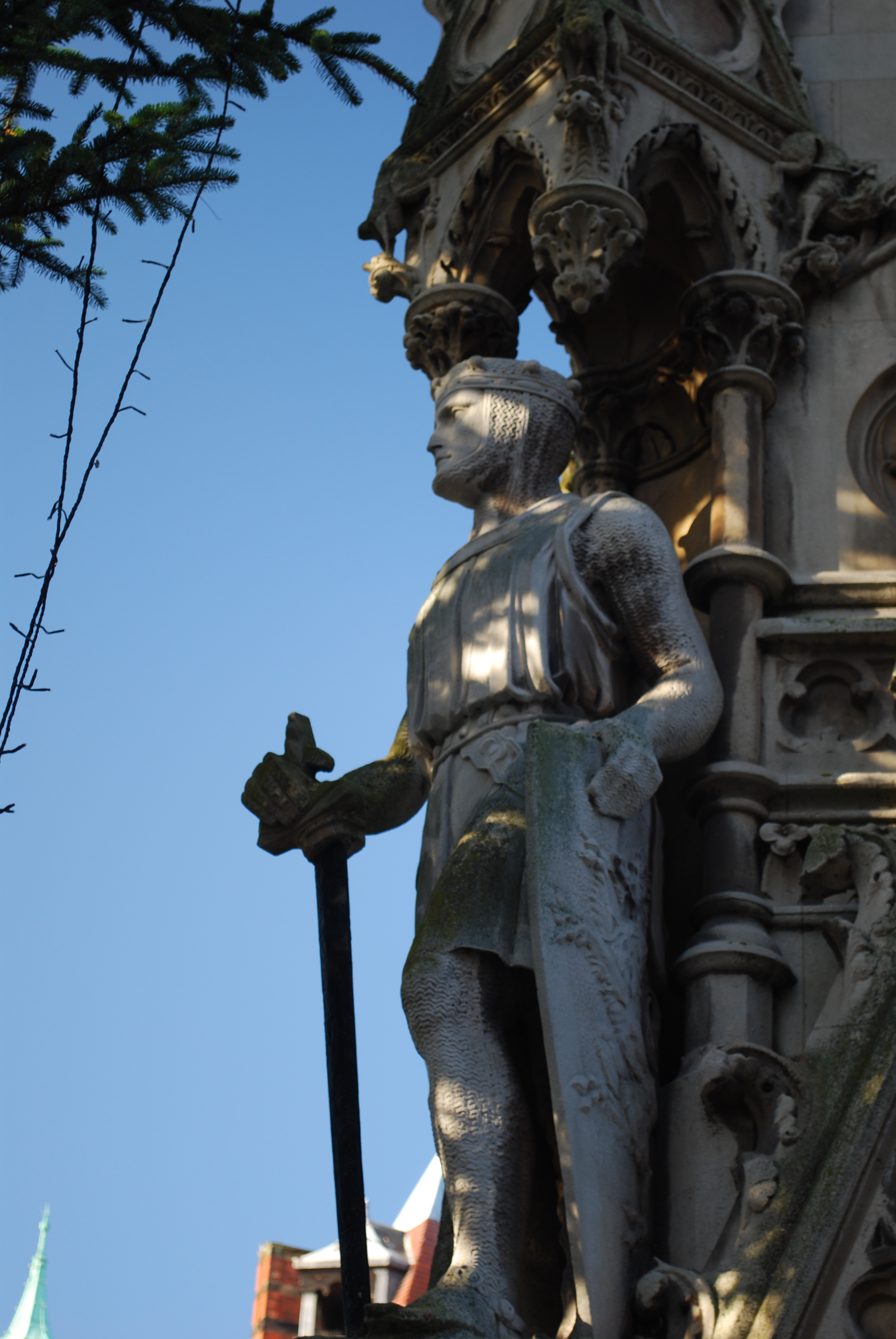
Simon de Montfort

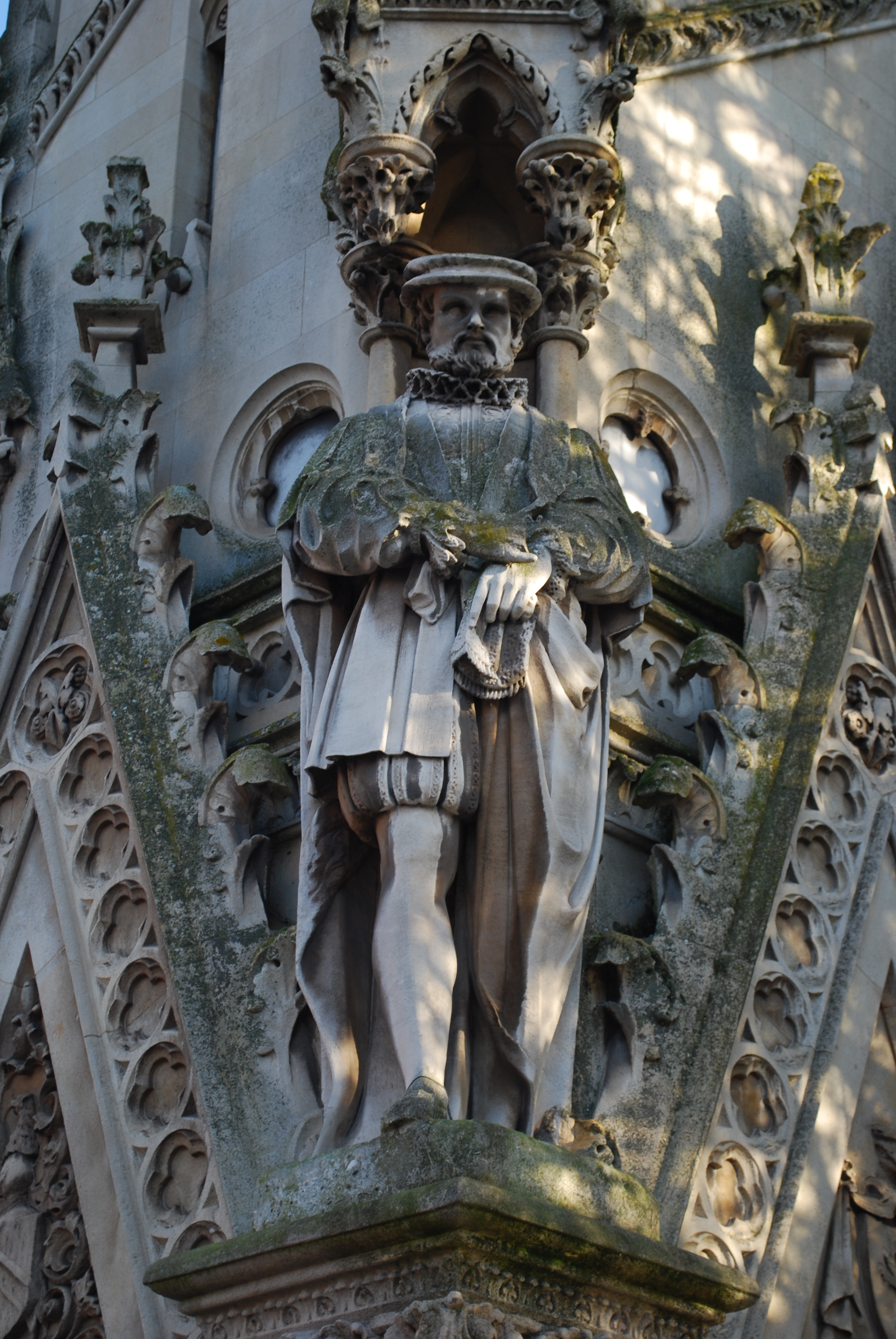
William Wigston

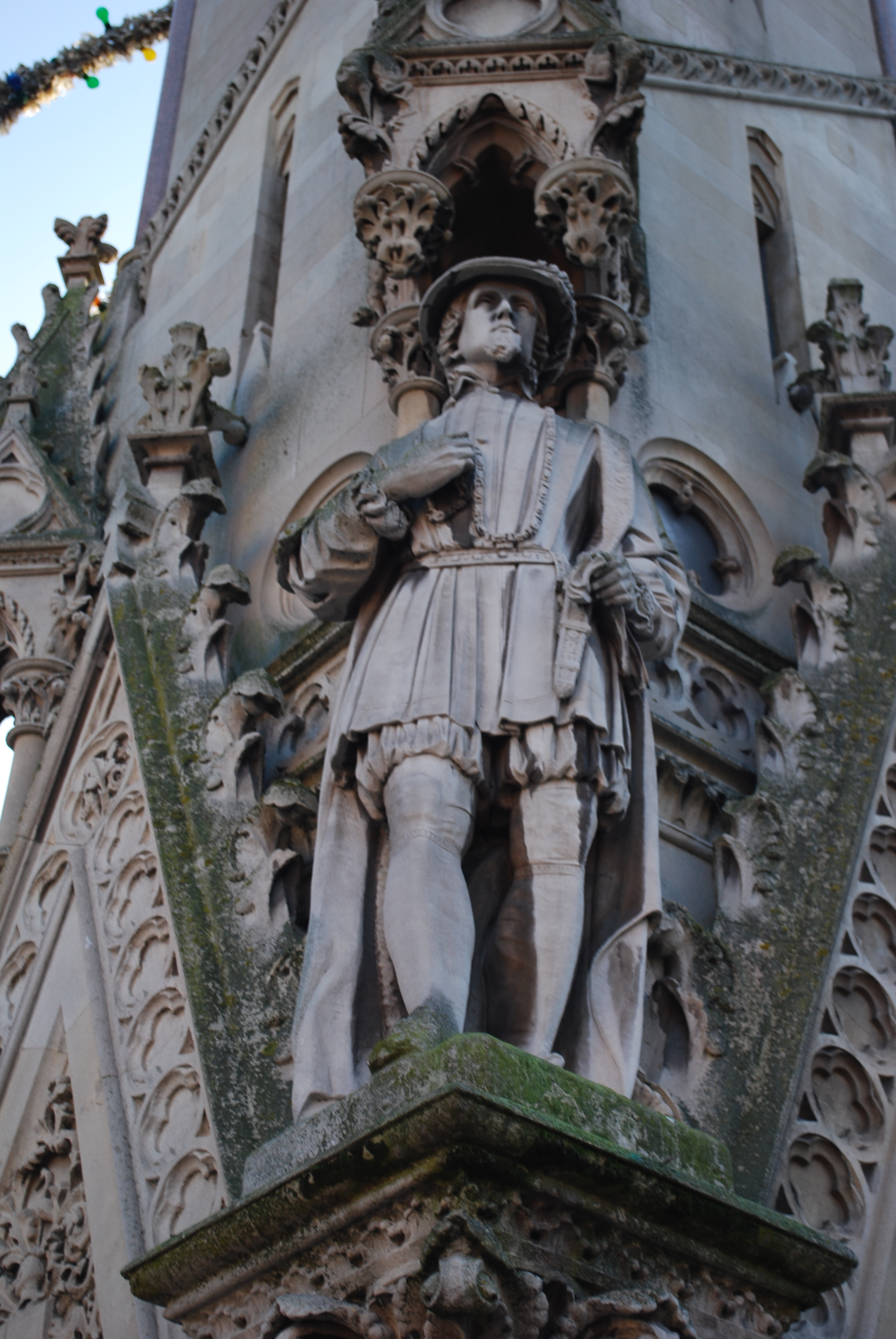
Thomas White

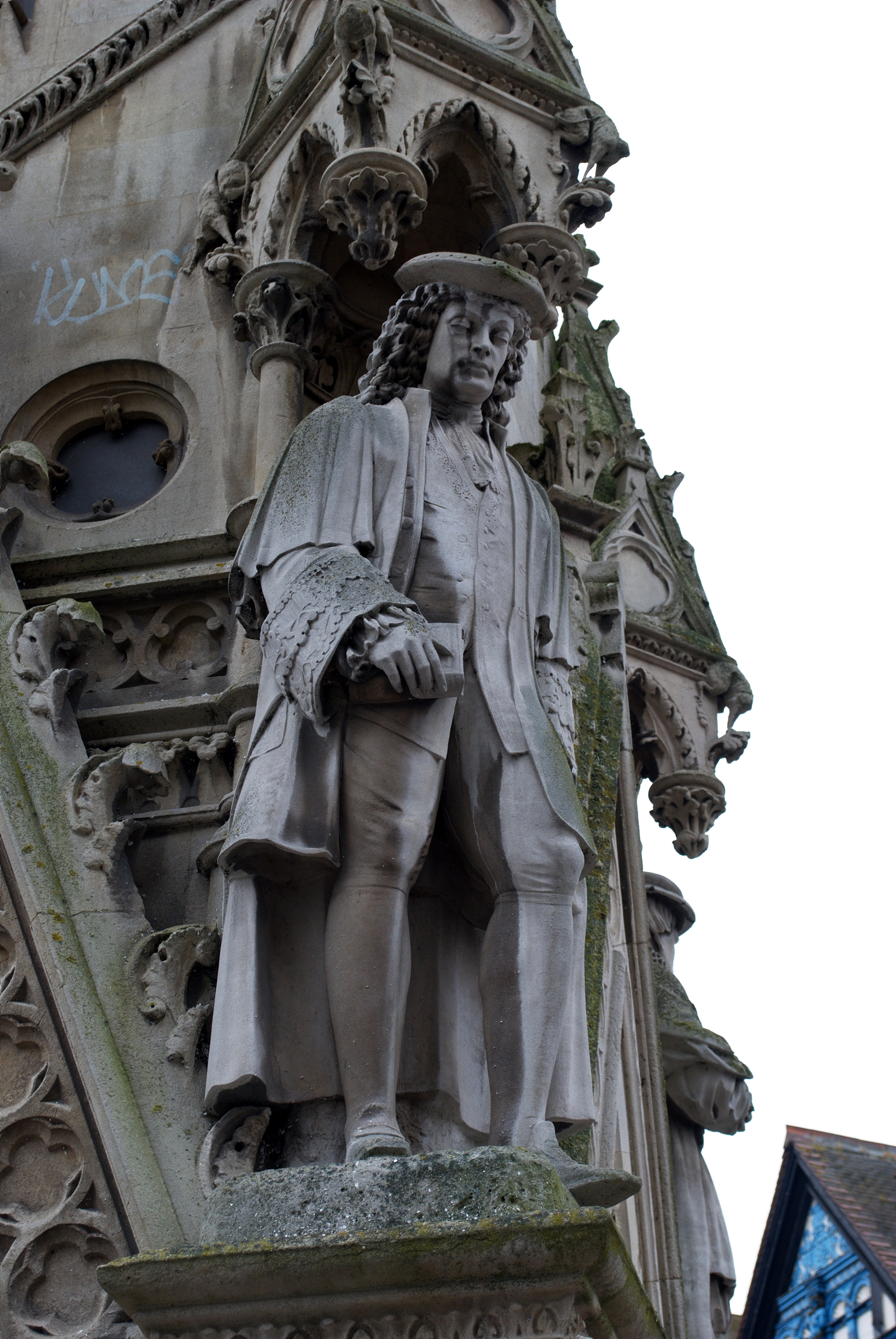
Gabriel Newton
