= Tom Lowe (writer) =

American filmmaker and writer

Tom Löwe is a filmmaker and writer from Southern California. A Gulf War combat veteran, Lowe is best known as the director of TimeScapes (2012), a 40-minute non-verbal-narrative film. He was named Astronomy Photographer of the Year in 2010.

Löwe is also the author of Spin, a roman à clef based on his experience working as a political aide in California. He is a former director of public affairs for the Speaker of the California Assembly, and a former producer of the public affairs roundtable The McLaughlin Group.

In November 2010, Löwe served as 2nd Unit Director and 2nd Unit Director of Photography on Godfrey Reggio's feature film Visitors. Löwe spent five years working as a 2nd Unit Director on Terrence Malick's Voyage of Time. Löwe is the founder and proprietor of the largest timelapse community on the internet, Timescapes. In 2010 and 2011, Löwe shot a 40-minute non-narrative film entitled TimeScapes in the Southwestern United States. The film was published in 2012 in different formats.

In July 2017, Löwe announced his second film, AWAKEN.
