= Roger Humberston =

English politician (fl. 1389–1418)

Roger Humberston (fl. 1389–1418) was an English politician. He sat as MP for Leicester in January 1397.

He was the son of the merchant William Humberston Sr. of Leicester and the brother of MP William Humberston. Before September 1392, he married Margaret, the daughter of John Tansley and widow of John Samon of Nottingham. They had one daughter.

He also served as Mayor of Leicester from Michaelmas 1398 to 1399 and 1410 to 1411.
