= Nigel Stanford =

New Zealand composer

- Birth name: Nigel John Stanford
- Born: 4 October 1980 (age 44)
- Origin: Wellington, New Zealand
- Occupation: Composer
- Website: nigelstanford.com

Nigel Stanford is a New Zealand composer, best known for his soundtrack for the movie TimeScapes directed by Tom Lowe, as well as his music videos Cymatics and Automatica.

In January 2019, a Huawei commercial was accused of plagiarizing Stanford's Cymatics video; Huawei eventually removed the video.

== Discography ==
=== Albums ===
- Deep Space (1999) (as John Stanford)
- Timescapes (2012)
- Solar Echoes (2014)
- Automatica (2017)

=== Singles ===
- "Cymatics" (2014)
- "Automatica" (2017)
- "One Hundred Hunters" (2018)
- "Forever" (2018)

=== Remixes ===
- Last Night on Earth (Celldweller) (Nigel Stanford Remix) (2018)

== Filmography ==
Nigel contributed in the film TimeScapes directed by Tom Lowe. This is an English language documentary about arts, nature with no narration published in 2012 .
