= John Sanford (Bridgwater MP) =

English Member of Parliament (1640–1711)

Member of the House of Commons of England
- Constituency: Taunton (1685, 1689) Minehead (1690, 1695)

Personal details
- Born: 1640
- Died: 1711 (aged 70–71)
- Occupation: Politician

John Sanford (1640–1711), of Basinghall Street, London and Nynehead Court, Somerset was an English politician who sat in the House of Commons during the later Stuart period. He represented Taunton and Minehead as a Member of Parliament in the late 17th century.

== Early life ==
Sanford was born in 1640 and established himself as a member of the gentry with commercial and landed interests in both London and Somerset. He acquired Nynehead Court in Somerset which became his principal country residence.

== Career ==
Sanford entered Parliament as Member of Parliament for Bridgwater, serving during the later years of the Restoration period. His political career was typical of provincial gentry with financial interests in London, combining local influence with parliamentary service.

== Personal life ==
He resided at Basinghall Street in the City of London and at Nynehead Court in Somerset. Sanford died in 1711.

== See also ==
- History of Parliament
- Cavalier Parliament
- Bridgwater (UK Parliament constituency)
