= John Stanford II =

English politician

John Stanford (died 1603) was an English lawyer and politician.

He was the son of John Stanford I (d. 1603), Mayor of Leicester and twice MP for Leicester (UK Parliament constituency). He trained as a lawyer, entering Gray's Inn in 1586.

He sat as Member (MP) of the Parliament of England for Leicester in 1597. By 1600 he was retained as counsel for Leicester, becoming recorder in the summer of 1603.

He succeeded his father to the manor and rectory of Barkby in March 1603, but less than 9 months later at the beginning of December. He was buried Barkby.

== Family ==
He married Elizabeth, daughter of William Baynbrigge of Lockington, Leicestershire, with whom he had 3 children:

- Thomas, aged 7 in 1603, married Anne, daughter of Thomas Staveley of West Langton, Leicestershire.
- Elizabeth
- Katharine married 1) Thomas Bellers of Wymeswold, Leicestershire and 2) Richard Hacker of Walesby, Nottinghamshire

His widow subsequently married Robert Terringham of Weston, Northamptonshire
