= Henry Stanford (American football) =

American football coach

Biographical details
- Education: Ohio State

Coaching career (HC unless noted)
- 1996–1998: Ohio State (SA)
- 1999: Tiffin (RB)
- 2000–2001: Otterbein (assistant)
- 2002: Kenyon (assistant)
- 2003: Tiffin (RB)
- 2004–2007: Elmhurst (OC)
- 2008–2009: Capital (OC)
- 2010–2012: Capital
- 2013–2015: Hiram (AHC)
- 2016–2019: Hiram

Head coaching record
- Overall: 19–41

Henry Stanford is an American former football coach. He was the head football coach at Hiram University in Hiram, Ohio, a position he assumed in 2016 after three previous seasons as the team's offensive coordinator. Stanford resigned during the 2019 season after the Terriers started with an 0–6 record and 0–5 mark in North Coast Athletic Conference play. Stanford served as the head coach at Capital University in Columbus, Ohio from 2010 to 2012.

== Head coaching record ==
Year	Team	Overall	Conference	Standing	Bowl/playoffs
Capital Crusaders (Ohio Athletic Conference) (2010–2012)
2010	Capital	5–5	5–4	T–4th	
2011	Capital	5–5	5–4	T–4th	
2012	Capital	2–8	2–7	8th	
Capital:		12–18	12–15		
Hiram Terriers (North Coast Athletic Conference) (2016–2019)
2016	Hiram	3–7	3–6	7th	
2017	Hiram	2–8	1–8	9th	
2018	Hiram	2–8	1–8	9th	
2019	Hiram	0–6 (Note: Stanford resigned after the first six games of the 2019 season. Chris Rosselot led the lead as interim head coach for the final four games. Hiram finished the season with an overall record of 0–10 and a conference mark of 0–9, placing tenth in the North Coast Athletic Conference.)	0–5		
Hiram:		7–29	5–27		
Total:		19–47			
