= John Stanford I =

English politician

John Stanford (1537–1603) was an English politician.

He was the eldest son of Thomas Stanford, Mayor of Leicester. His grandfather, a prosperous butcher, had acquired the manor of Barkby in 1552 and Stanford inherited it along with the rectory from his father in 1583.

He was made a Freeman of Leicester in 1558, chamberlain in 1565, coroner in 1573–74 and mayor in 1576–77 and 1592–93. He was elected a Member (MP) of the Parliament of England for Leicester in 1572 and 1593.

He married as his second wife Elizabeth (d. 1611), the daughter of his godfather John Heyrick (d. 1589), an alderman of Leicester, and cousin of the poet Robert Herrick

He died in March 1603 and was buried at Barkby, where a funeral monument was later erected to commemorate him, his wife and eldest son.

== Issue ==
- John (d. 1603) of Barkby Thorpe, Leicestershire
- Henry of Slawston, Leicestershire
- Elizabeth married William Foxe of Ratcliffe Culey, Leicestershire
