= Sir Francis Samuel Drake, 1st Baronet =

Royal Navy officer (1729–1789)

Rear-Admiral Sir Francis Samuel Drake Bt
- Born: 1729
- Died: 19 October 1789 (aged 59–60)
- Military career
- Allegiance: Great Britain
- Branch: Royal Navy
- Service years: – 1789
- Rank: Rear-Admiral of the Red
- Commands: HMS Viper; HMS Bideford; HMS Falkland; HMS Rochester; HMS Burford; HMS Torbay; HMS Russell
- Conflicts: Seven Years' War; Battle of Quiberon Bay; Invasion of Dominica (1761); Invasion of Martinique (1762); American War of Independence; Dutch West Indies campaign; Capture of Sint Eustatius; Battle of Fort Royal; Battle of the Chesapeake; Battle of Saint Kitts; Battle of the Saintes

Rear-Admiral of the Red Sir Francis Samuel Drake, 1st Baronet (1729 – 19 October 1789) was a Royal Navy officer who served in the Seven Years' War and American War of Independence.

== Early life ==
Francis was baptised on 14 September 1729, at Buckland Monachorum, Devonshire. He was the fourth son of Sir Francis Drake, 4th Baronet, and Anne Heathcote. He was the younger brother of Sir Francis Henry Drake, 5th Baronet, the last in the line of baronets descending from Sir Francis Drake, 1st Baronet, nephew of the Elizabethan naval hero Sir Francis Drake. He served for a time as lieutenant aboard the 44-gun HMS Torrington and the 60-gun HMS Windsor. He was promoted to command the 10-gun sloop HMS Viper on 30 March 1756, during the Seven Years' War, and achieved the rank of post-captain later that year with a posting to command the 20-gun HMS Bideford on 15 November. On 11 March 1757 he was appointed, in succession to his second brother, Francis William Drake, to the 50-gun HMS Falkland. He commanded the Falkland for the next five years. He was present in the West Indies during the operations under Commodore John Moore between 1757 and 1758, and then went to St. Helena to escort the homeward-bound trade in the spring of 1759. He served on the south coast of Brittany that autumn with the squadron under Captain Robert Duff, and was present at the defeat of the French at the Battle of Quiberon Bay on 20 November 1759.

Drake then served in the St. Lawrence River with Commodore Swanton in the summer of 1760; with Lord Colville on the coast of North America, and with Sir James Douglas at the Leeward Islands in 1761 during the Invasion of Dominica, continuing there under Sir George Rodney in 1762 during the Invasion of Martinique, when he was moved into the 50-gun HMS Rochester, which he commanded until the end of the war.

== American War of Independence ==
Drake was appointed to command the 70-gun HMS Burford in 1766, and moved from there to the 74-gun HMS Torbay between 1772 and 1775. Torbay was the guardship at Plymouth during this time. With the outbreak of the American War of Independence, Drake was appointed to command the 74-gun HMS Russell in the spring of 1778. The Russell was one of the squadron which sailed for America under the command of Vice-Admiral John Byron. Russell was badly damaged in a gale which scattered the squadron, and Drake was forced to return to England for repairs. He therefore did not sail to America until the spring of 1779. During that year and the early part of 1780, Drake operated as part of the fleet under the command of Vice-Admiral Mariot Arbuthnot.

Drake was then sent to join Rodney in the West Indies, and accompanied him to the coast of North America, and back again to the West Indies, where he was promoted to Rear-Admiral of the Red on 26 September 1780. He then hoisted his flag in the 70-gun HMS Princessa; took part under Rodney in the operations against the Dutch Islands, including the Capture of Sint Eustatius, and was detached under Sir Samuel Hood to blockade Martinique, where, with his flag in HMS Gibraltar, he was warmly engaged in the Battle of Fort Royal against with De Grasse on 29 April 1781. In August, with his flag again on Princessa, he accompanied Hood to North America, and commanded the van at the Battle of the Chesapeake on 5 September, with the fleet under Sir Thomas Graves. Princessa was heavily damaged in the battle, forcing Drake to shift his flag temporarily to the 74-gun HMS Alcide.

He afterwards returned with Hood to the West Indies, took part with him in the Battle of Saint Kitts in January 1782, and on 12 April, by the accident of position, commanded the vanguard of the fleet under Sir George Rodney in the Battle of the Saintes. He was made a baronet on 28 May 1782 for his conduct on this occasion. He continued in the West Indies until the end of the war, after which he had no further service.

== Later life and death ==
On 12 August 1789, Drake was appointed a junior lord of the admiralty, but died shortly afterwards, on 19 October 1789. He was twice married, first, to Elizabeth Hayman, of Kent; and, secondly, in January 1788, to Pooley, daughter of George Onslow, Esq., M.P. for Guildford, but left no issue, and the baronetcy became extinct. His elder brother, Francis William, a vice-admiral, with whom he is frequently confused, died about the same time, with descendants by his daughter but no male issue; and the eldest brother, Francis Henry, the hereditary baronet, dying also without issue this title too became extinct.

== Notes ==
Baronetage of Great Britain
New creation	Baronet (of Prospect); 1782–1789	Extinct
Preceded by Fletcher baronets	Drake baronets of Prospect; 28 May 1782	Succeeded by Palk baronets
