= James Whitshed =

James Whitshed may refer to:

- James Hawkins-Whitshed (1762–1849), Royal Navy officer
- James Whitshed (died 1789) (c. 1716–1789), Irish politician
- James Whitshed (died 1735), MP for Wicklow
