= Anthony James Pye Molloy =

British navy officer (c. 1754–1814)

Captain Anthony James Pye Molloy
- Born: c. 1754
- Died: 25 July 1814 (aged 59–60); Cheltenham
- Relatives: Sir Thomas Pye (uncle)
- Military career
- Allegiance: Kingdom of Great Britain
- Branch: Royal Navy
- Service years: – 1795
- Rank: Captain
- Commands: HMS Thunder; HMS Trident; HMS Intrepid; HMS Carnatic; HMS Fortitude; HMS Bombay Castle; HMS Ganges; HMS Caesar
- Conflicts: American Revolutionary War; Battle of Sullivan's Island; Battle of Rhode Island; Battle of Grenada; Battle of Martinique; Dutch West Indies campaign; Battle of Fort Royal; Battle of the Chesapeake; Battle of St. Kitts; French Revolutionary Wars; Atlantic campaign of May 1794; Glorious First of June

Anthony James Pye Molloy (c. 1754 – 25 July 1814) was an officer of the Royal Navy. He served during the American War of Independence and the French Revolutionary Wars.

Molloy rose through the ranks to command a number of ships during the war with America, and saw action in most of the naval engagements of the conflict, both off the North American coast and in the Caribbean. He commanded several ships during the peace that followed, and after the outbreak of the French Revolutionary Wars, he served with the fleet in the Atlantic. He was part of Lord Howe's fleet at the Glorious First of June, but was sharply criticised by Howe in the aftermath. Molloy was then tried by court martial for failing to obey orders, or to do his utmost to engage the enemy. The charges were subsequently proved and Molloy was dismissed from his ship.

Molloy's personal life was later the subject of some speculation, with rumours that he had acted dishonourably to a woman, who had then cursed him, resulting in his disgrace at the Glorious First of June. He married a daughter of Admiral Sir John Laforey, but it was imputed that his weak nature on the battlefield extended to his house, and that he was dominated by his wife. He died in 1814 at the age of 60, having never again served at sea.

== Early years and American War of Independence ==
Molloy was born c. 1754 and embarked on a naval career. He was the nephew of another Royal Navy officer, Thomas Pye, who later became an admiral. He rose through the ranks and was promoted to his first commands during the American War of Independence, commanding the bomb vessel HMS Thunder off North America from June 1776. He was with Peter Parker's squadron at the Battle of Sullivan's Island on 28 June 1776, and was succeeded as commander of Thunder by Commander James Gambier in April 1778.

Molloy was promoted to post-captain on 11 April 1778, and given command of the 64-gun HMS Trident, flying the broad pennant of Commodore John Elliot. Trident sailed for North America on 16 April, and Molloy was present with Lord Howe's force at Sandy Hook on 22 July 1778, where the comte d'Estaing was successfully repulsed without an action being fought. Molloy was present at Howe's next encounter with the comte d'Estaing, during the Battle of Rhode Island in August that year, and on Elliot's return to Britain in December, Molloy took Trident to join Vice-Admiral John Byron's forces in the West Indies. Trident was part of Byron's fleet at the Battle of Grenada on 6 July 1779 and then at the Battle of Martinique on 17 April 1780. Molloy followed this up with service in the two actions off St Lucia on 15 and 19 May 1780, before handing over Trident to Captain John Thomas.

Molloy's next ship was the 64-gun HMS Intrepid, which he commissioned in 1781. He was with Sir George Brydges Rodney during the Dutch West Indies campaign in early 1781, and was present at the capture of Sint Eustatius on 3 February, and at the Battle of Fort Royal on 29/30 April. He returned to North America with Sir Samuel Hood's fleet, and was present at the Battle of the Chesapeake on 5 September 1781. Molloy was commended for his efforts during the battle, being described as having 'behaved most gallantly', and for having assisted HMS Shrewsbury. Molloy returned to the West Indies with Hood, arriving there on 5 December 1781. He took part in the Battle of St. Kitts on 25 and 26 January 1782. Having served in many of the naval engagements of the American War of Independence, Molloy sailed to Jamaica in May that year, and then back to Britain with a convoy, where he paid Intrepid off in August.

== Peace ==
Molloy commissioned the 74-gun HMS Carnatic as the Chatham guardship in March 1783, and remained with her until 1785, when she was moved to Plymouth. He is recorded as commissioning the 74-gun HMS Fortitude in October 1787, though she was paid off again in December 1787. He briefly commanded the Plymouth guardship, the 74-gun HMS Bombay Castle, until she was paid off to be fitted for sea again the following year. His last command during the peace was the 74-gun HMS Ganges, which he recommissioned in December 1792.

== French Revolutionary Wars ==
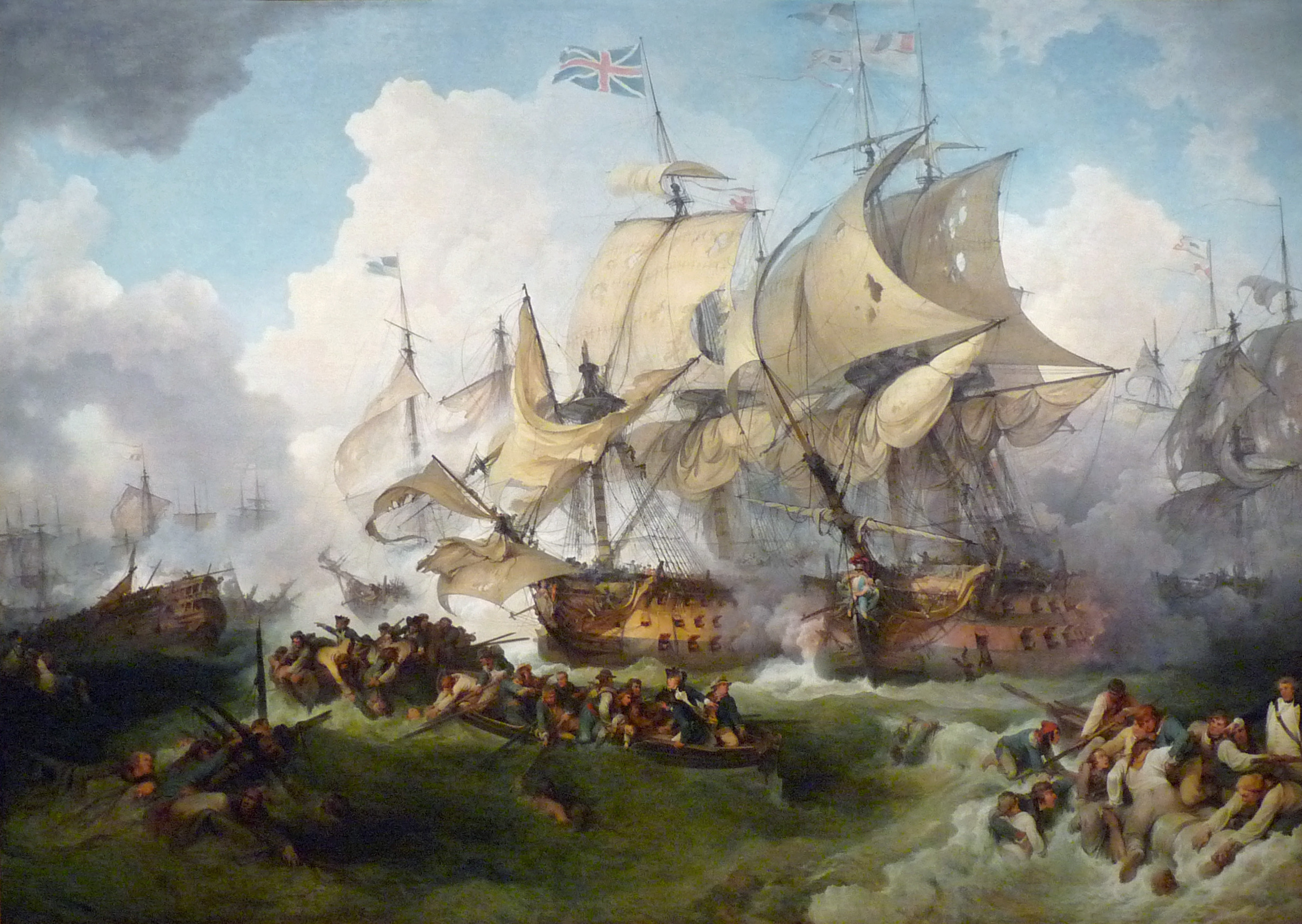
Lord Howe's action, or the Glorious First of June, Philippe-Jacques de Loutherbourg, 1795

Molloy and Ganges were part of the fleet under Lord Howe which encountered and then pursued Pierre Jean Van Stabel's squadron in the Atlantic on 18 November 1793. Molloy left Ganges in late 1793, commissioning the newly built 80-gun HMS Caesar in December that year. Molloy was attached to Lord Howe's fleet, hunting for the French convoys during the Atlantic campaign of May 1794. When the French fleet, under Louis Thomas Villaret de Joyeuse, was sighted, Howe ordered an attack, with Molloy leading the column into battle at the Glorious First of June. Caesar sustained casualties of 18 men killed and 71 wounded, but in the aftermath Molloy was strongly criticised by Howe for failing to obey orders and break the French line.

== Court martial ==
Accordingly, a court martial was convened aboard HMS Glory at Portsmouth on 28 April 1795, and Molloy was charged with '[his failure to] cross the enemy's line, in obedience to the signal of the admiral', and 'that he did not use his utmost endeavours to close with and defeat the enemy'. Speaking for the prosecution was Rear-Admiral Sir Roger Curtis, the captain of the fleet during the battle. Molloy argued that the ship had been thrown into confusion after a ball had struck the stern-beam and left her unmanageable, but after three weeks of deliberations, the charges were found to have been proved. The court tempered the findings with the observation that his courage was unimpeachable, but nevertheless he was sentenced to be dismissed from his ship.

== Family and later life ==
Molloy never again held another command. He had married Juliana Laforey, one of the daughters of Admiral Sir John Laforey, and the couple had at least three children, Charles, John and Mary. Mary married Sir John Beresford, another naval officer. In time a story began to circulate that before his marriage to Juliana, he had been engaged to marry another woman, but had behaved dishonourably. Her friends had pressed her to bring an action for breach of promise, but she refused, saying that God would judge him. The two happened to meet accidentally at Bath, whereupon she said to him "Captain Molloy, you are a bad man. I wish you the greatest curse that can befall a British officer. When the day of battle comes, may your false heart fail you!" Molloy's actions at the Glorious First of June, and his subsequent disgrace at the court martial were then presumed to be the result of her curse. Molloy's problems with women were not over, with the suggestion that he was dominated by his wife. A short refrain appeared in print, running:

I, Anthony James Pye Molloy
Can burn, take, sink and destroy;
There's only one thing I can't do, upon my life!
And that is, to stop the d-d tongue of my wife.

Molloy died at Cheltenham on 25 July 1814, having sustained a fall down some stairs at Montpelier House and injured his back. He was 60 years old.

== Notes ==
a. President of the court martial was Admiral Joseph Peyton, with Vice-Admirals Sir Richard King and Charles Buckner, Rear-Admiral John Colpoys, and Captains Francis Parry, Charles Powell Hamilton, Alexander Graeme, Charles M Pole, Christopher Parker, Lord Charles FitzGerald, Andrew Mitchell, Sir Erasmus Gower and James Richard Dacres.
