= Sir William Villiers, 3rd Baronet =

English politician

Sir William Villiers, 3rd Baronet (9 January 1645 – 27 February 1712) was an English politician from the Villiers family.

He was the only son of Sir George Villiers, 2nd Baronet and his wife Penelope Denham, daughter of Sir John Denham. In 1682, he succeeded his father as baronet. Villiers was a Member of Parliament (MP) for Leicester in the Parliament of England from 1698 until 1701. He lived at the family seat, Brooksby Hall, Leicestershire.

Villiers married Anne Potts, daughter of Charles Potts. Their marriage was childless and with his death the baronetcy became extinct and Brooksby Hall was sold.

Parliament of England
Preceded by Archdale Palmer; Sir Edward Abney	Member of Parliament for Leicester; 1698–1701; With: Lawrence Carter	Succeeded by James Winstanley; Lawrence Carter
Baronetage of England
Preceded by George Villiers	Baronet (of Brooksby); 1682–1712	Extinct
