= Francis William Drake =

Royal Navy officer, politician and colonial administrator

Vice-Admiral Francis William Drake
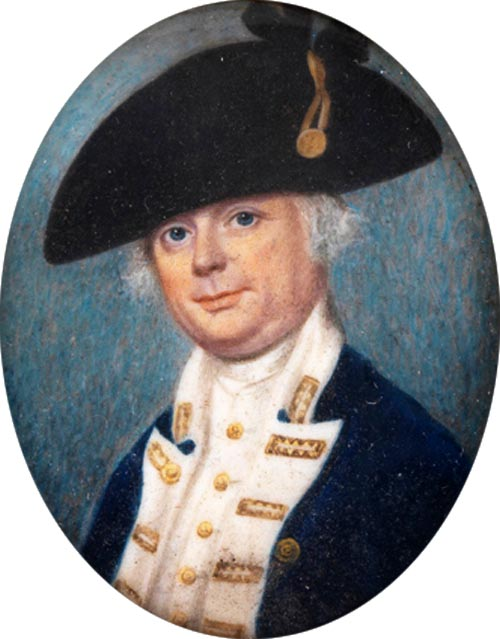
- Miniature portrait of Drake
- Born: 22 August 1724; Buckland Monachorum, Devon
- Died: 5 December 1787 (aged 63)
- Relatives: Sir Francis Drake, 4th Baronet (father); Sir Francis Henry Drake, 5th Baronet (brother); Sir Francis Samuel Drake, 1st Baronet (brother)
- Military career
- Allegiance: Great Britain
- Branch: Royal Navy
- Service years: c. 1732–1787
- Rank: Vice-Admiral of the Red
- Commands: HMS Dreadnought Prize; HMS Fowey; HMS Mercury; HMS Boston; HMS Falkland; HMS Edgar; The Downs
- Conflicts: War of the Austrian Succession; Seven Years' War; Battle of Lagos; Battle of Quiberon Bay; Capture of Belle Île; Battle of Havana; American War of Independence

Viceregal styles of Francis William Drake
- Reference style: His Excellency
- Spoken style: Your Excellency

Vice-Admiral of the Red Francis William Drake (22 August 1724 – 5 December 1787) was a Royal Navy officer, politician and colonial administrator who served in the War of the Austrian Succession, Seven Years' War and American War of Independence.

== Family and early life ==
Not much is known of Francis William's early life. He was born in Buckland Monachorum, Devon in 1724 and was baptized on 22 August that year. He was the third son, and the second surviving son, of Anne Heathcote and Sir Francis Henry Drake. This line of Drakes descended from the brother of Elizabethan naval hero Sir Francis Drake. Francis William is often confused with his younger brother, Francis Samuel, also a naval officer whose death occurred around the same time. All four sons of Sir Francis Henry Drake had Francis as their first name, which further adds to the confusion. The sons' names were, Francis Henry, Francis Duncombe, Francis William and Francis Samuel.

Drake joined the Royal Navy at an early age (about 8 or 10). He was promoted to lieutenant, and then to commander on 18 October 1743. He commanded first the HMS Dreadnought Prize from April 1747 to January 1748. He was then promoted to post-captain on 29 January 1748 at the age of 23. That year he commanded HMS Fowey during the War of the Austrian Succession. He went out the West Indies to serve under Charles Knowles, and came across the Spanish vessel St. Judea and captured her with her 108 crew. HMS Fowey was shipwrecked at the Florida Keys while towing the St. Judea to Virginia. An investigation was launched by the Admiralty, but all were exonerated on testimony that they were the victim of a strange current.

== North America ==
From Fowey he was appointed to command HMS Mercury in May 1749 until 1750 and in 1751 took command of the 24-gun HMS Boston. During this time he served under Commodore Sir George Rodney at Newfoundland and was sent into Conception and Trinity Bay's and as far north as Cape Bonavista where he had authority to hear appeals from decisions of fishing admirals and to enforce the various provisions of the Trade to Newfoundland Act 1698. In 1750 Drake served as the de facto Governor of Newfoundland under Commodore Rodney, senior naval officer in 1750 and 1751, and was appointed to the position of governor in 1752.

== Governorship ==
Drake was instrumental in making reforms in the Newfoundland justice system in the way that prisoners were incarcerated and the requirement that people charged with criminal offences had to be transported to England for trial. The instructions given to Drake were to appoint judges and commissioners oyer and terminer to hear all criminal cases except treason. After returning to England Drake had suggested additional reforms urging that the provision forbidding the execution of those convicted of criminal offences be changed. He suggested that a secure prison be built in St. John's as prisoners could easily escape or freeze to death while awaiting transport to England while incarcerated over the winter while the British cabinet determined their fate. Changes were granted including the right to execute prisoners found guilty of crimes.

== Seven Years' War ==
Drake was appointed to command the 50-gun HMS Falkland in October 1755, remaining in command until 1757, when he was succeeded by his younger brother, Francis Samuel. Francis William took command of the 60-gun HMS Edgar in December 1758. He remained in command for the rest of the Seven Years' War. He was present at the Battle of Lagos on 18 August 1759 under Sir Edward Boscawen, the Battle of Quiberon Bay on 20 November 1759 under Sir Edward Hawke, and the Capture of Belle Île between 4 and 8 June 1761 under Augustus Keppel. Drake then went out to the West Indies again, and was present at the Battle of Havana between 6 June and 13 August 1762 under Sir George Pocock, before retiring on half pay in 1763.

== Political career and further appointments ==
Drake's elder brother, the fifth baronet, had previously represented Bere Alston in the House of Commons. He was appointed Master of the Household in 1771, and chose not to seek re-election. Instead Francis William was elected in his place, on 29 January 1771. He voted with the government on most issues, and did not seek re-election in the 1774 general election.

He was promoted to Rear-Admiral of the Blue on 23 January 1778 and Rear-Admiral of the Red on 19 March 1779, taking up command in the Downs in 1779 during the American War of Independence. He flew his flag at first aboard the 60-gun HMS Dunkirk between July and November 1779, and then aboard HMS Dromedary from November 1779 until 1781. He was promoted to Vice-Admiral of the Blue on 26 September 1780 and was given command of a squadron of the Channel Fleet under Vice-admiral George Darby. He hoisted his flag aboard the 100-gun HMS Victory and remained there until 29 December 1780.

He flew his flag for a brief time in May 1782 aboard the 60-gun HMS Rippon, and then transferred to the 60-gun HMS Panther. He does not appear to have gone out with her to the Mediterranean with the fleet to relieve Gibraltar under Admiral Richard Howe. Lord Sandwich offered him further commands in the fleet under Rodney, but severe attacks of gout forced him to decline, and he eventually struck his flag and went ashore. He was nevertheless promoted to Vice-admiral of the Red in September 1787, and raised his pennant on HMS Ganges.

== Family and later life ==
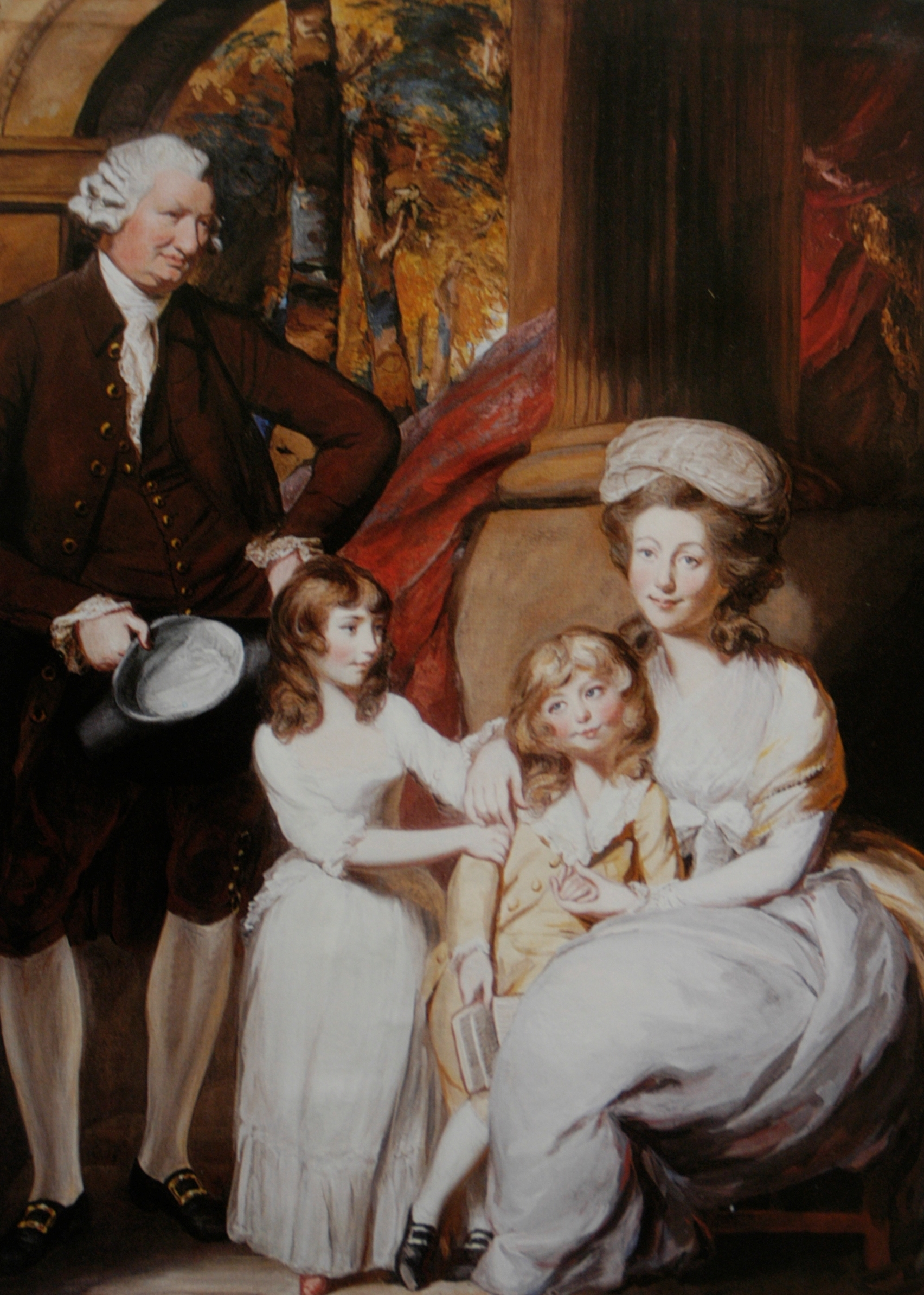
Daniel Gardner portrait of Drake, his wife Elizabeth and their two daughters Sophia and Marianne

Drake's family life is confused in later records with those of his younger brother Francis Samuel. He may have married, on 23 January 1788 in Ripley, the only daughter of George Onslow, for many years the member of parliament for Guildford. A special license was apparently required as she was a minor. The same fact is recorded though for his brother, and Pooley would have actually been thirty in 1788. Sir Lewis Namier's work, The History of Parliament: the House of Commons 1754-1790, recorded that Francis William married his cousin, Elizabeth Heathcote, the daughter of Sir William Heathcote, 1st Baronet on 3 November 1763. They had two daughters; the elder Sophia (1765 - 14 June 1803), was mother of Peter, 5th Count de Salis-Soglio. Francis William Drake died in December 1787. He was buried 15 December 1787 at Hursley, Hampshire.

== Bibliography ==
- Lewis Namier, ed. (1964). "Drake, Francis William (1724-87)". The History of Parliament: the House of Commons 1754-1790. historyofparliamentonline.org.
- Government House The Governorship of Newfoundland and Labrador

Parliament of Great Britain
Preceded by Sir Francis Henry Drake; John Bristow	Member of Parliament for Bere Alston; 1771–1774; With: Hon. George Hobart	Succeeded by Sir Francis Henry Drake; Hon. George Hobart
Political offices
Preceded by George Brydges Rodney	Governor of Newfoundland; 1750–1752	Succeeded by Hugh Bonfoy
Military offices
Preceded by Matthew Buckle	Commander-in-Chief, The Downs; 1779–1780	Succeeded by John Evans (Acting)
