= Thomas Boothby-Skrymsher =

Thomas Boothby-Skrymsher (c.1698–6 June 1751) was a British landowner and Whig politician.

Born around 1698, he was the eldest son of Thomas Boothby and his first wife Elizabeth, daughter of Sir Charles Skrymsher. He was educated at Magdalen College, Oxford, matriculating on 16 March 1715 at the age of 16. He married Anne, the daughter of Sir Hugh Clopton, on 17 January 1721, through whom he became related to Robert Walpole. By this time he had taken the additional name of his maternal grandfather under the terms of his will.

Boothby-Skrymsher stood unsuccessfully as a whig for Leicester in the general election of 1722, but was returned in the same seat in a By-election on 27 January 1727. He served just eight months, being defeated in the general election held later that year. In 1736, he became register general of all trading ships belonging to Great Britain, a post that he held for three years. He died on 6 June 1751, leaving five sons and three daughters.

Parliament of Great Britain
Preceded by Lawrence Carter; Sir George Beaumont	Member of Parliament for Leicester; 1727; With: Sir George Beaumont	Succeeded by George Wrighte; Sir George Beaumont
