= James Winstanley =

British lawyer and Tory politician

James Winstanley (c. 1667 – 22 January 1719) was a British lawyer and Tory politician.

Born around 1667, James was the only son of Clement Winstanley of Braunstone Hall and his wife Catherine, the daughter of Sir Francis Willoughby of Wollaton Hall. He was educated at Jesus College, Cambridge, matriculating in 1684, and admitted to Gray's Inn on 4 February 1688. Around 1701 he married Frances Holt, daughter of James Holt of Castleton, Lancashire, with whom he had two sons and six daughters. His daughter Frances married Sir Benjamin Truman.

He was elected a Member of Parliament for Leicester in the second general election of 1701, and served until his death on 22 January 1719, aged 51.

Parliament of England
| Preceded by Sir William Villiers; Lawrence Carter | Member of Parliament for Leicester; 1701–1707; With: Lawrence Carter 1701–1702; Sir George Beaumont 1702–1707 | Succeeded by Parliament of Great Britain |
Parliament of Great Britain
| Preceded by Parliament of England | Member of Parliament for Leicester; 1707–1719; With: Sir George Beaumont | Succeeded by Thomas Noble; Sir George Beaumont |
