= Samuel Blackwell =

British politician

Samuel Blackwell (died 1785) was a British politician who sat in the House of Commons from 1774 to 1784.

Blackwell was born Samuel Killican, who became the adopted son of Jonathan Blackwell of Northaw, Hertfordshire. Jonathan Blackwell died in 1754 and left his estates to Killican on condition he adopted the name Blackwell, which was effected by Act of Parliament in 1755. Blackwell purchased the estate of Williamstrip, Gloucestershire from Humphrey Mackworth-Praed in 1759 and mortgaged the estate before the sale was completed in 1761. He married Anne Dutton, daughter of James Lennox Dutton of Sherborne, Gloucestershire in 1759 or 1760. He also purchased an estate at Ampney Crucis in 1765. He created Williamstrip Park between 1769 and 1777.

He was commissioned as a major in the Gloucestershire Militia when it was embodied in 1759 during the Seven Years' War, and he was appointed as Colonel of the North Gloucestershire Militia when that became a separate regiment in 1763. He commanded the regiment when it was embodied during the American War of Independence, and continued in command until his death.

Blackwell's acquisition of Ampney gave him an interest at Cirencester where he stood against the Bathurst interest in the 1768 general election without success. However, in 1774 he was elected Member of Parliament for Cirencester after a contest. He was elected again after a contest in 1780 and in 1784 he was returned without a contest. He supported North's Administration. There is little reference to him in contemporary political correspondence and no record of his having spoken in Parliament.

Blackwell died on 30 April 1785. His daughter Ann married Winchcombe Henry Hartley (who succeeded him as colonel of the North Gloucestershire Militia) as his third wife.

Parliament of Great Britain
Preceded by James Whitshed; Estcourt Creswell	Member of Parliament for Cirencester; 1774–1785; With: James Whitshed 1774-1783; Lord Apsley1783-1785	Succeeded by Lord Apsley; Richard Master
