= Scraptoft Hall =

Coordinates: 52°38′41″N 1°02′35″W

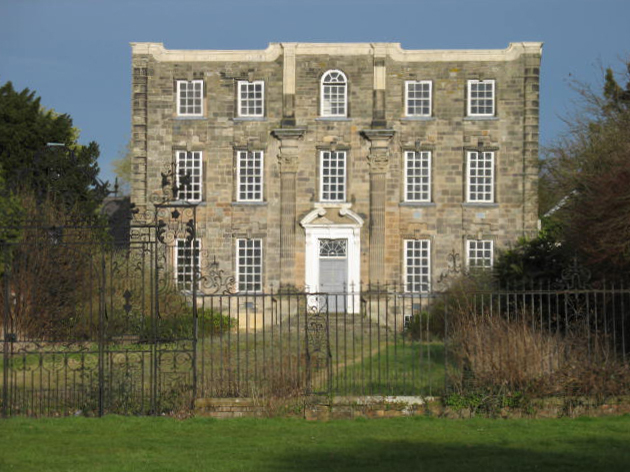
Scraptoft Hall

Scraptoft Hall is a former Georgian country house in the village of Scraptoft, Leicestershire, England. A Grade II listed building, it has since been converted to apartments.

The hall was built in 1723, based on a previous 17th-century house, for the widow of Sir Edward Wigley. A rear wing was added in 1896. The 5-window frontage is ashlar built in 3 storeys plus basement. The hall was inherited by Edward Wigley's son James, MP for Leicester, who laid out the ornamental lake and gardens. The front boundary wall and ornamental iron gates are separately Grade II* listed.

After James Wigley's death, the estate passed to his great-nephew, Edward Hartopp, who then took the additional surname of Wigley. It descended in the Hartopp family until they disposed of it after the First World War. After passing through a number of different hands it was acquired by Leicester Corporation in 1954 as the site for a new teachers' training college, the City of Leicester College of Education in Scraptoft, the Hall itself acting as the college principal's residence. The college became Scraptoft Campus of De Montfort University until it was closed in 2003, after which the college buildings were demolished. The Hall has since been restored for use as an apartment building.

== Residents and owners ==
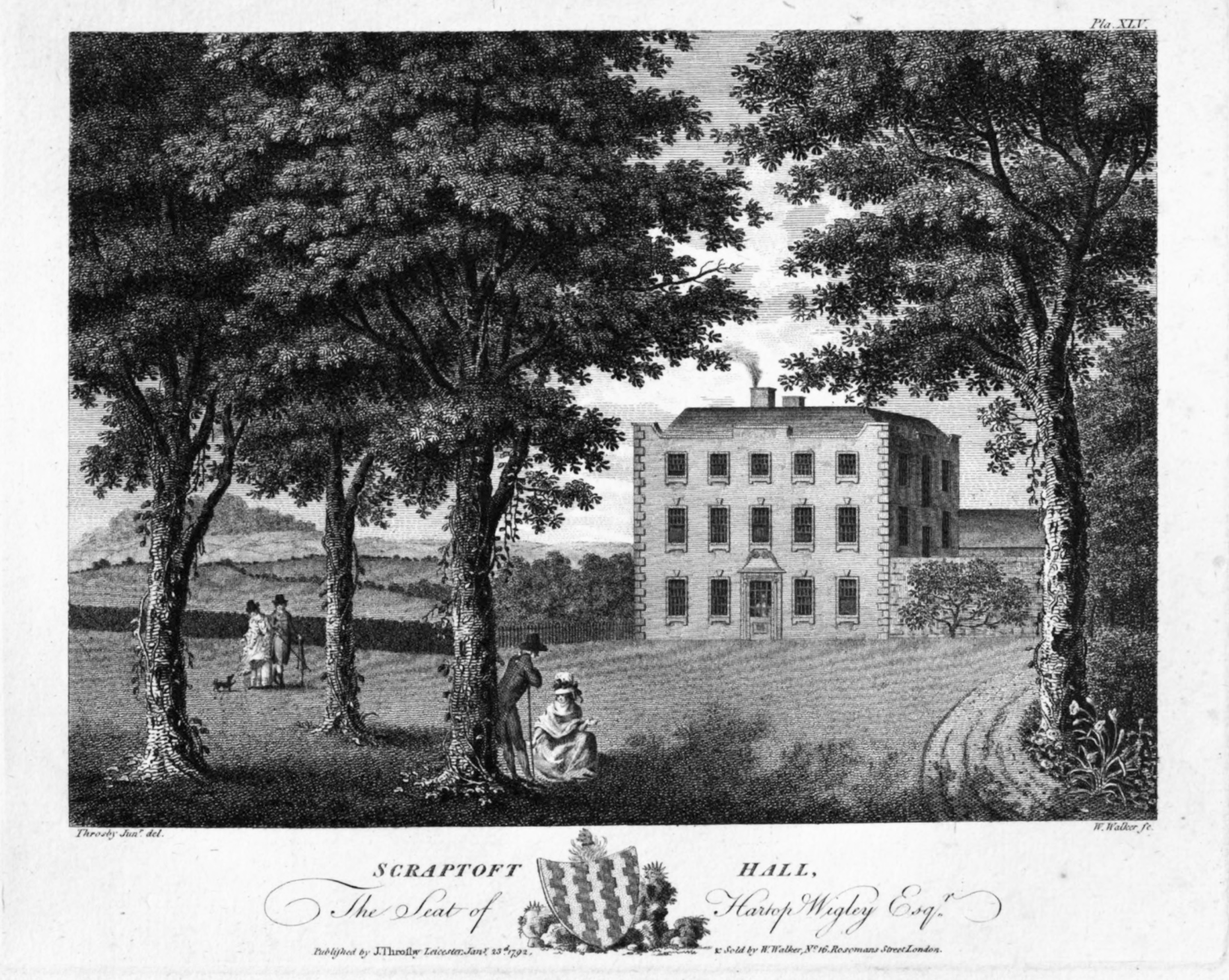
Engraving of Scraptoft Hall 1790

Lady Letitia Wigley (1670-1746) built Scraptoft Hall in 1723. She was the widow of Sir Edward Wigley who died in 1711. Her father was Arthur Cressey of Brigsley who made her his sole heir. She employed the notable craftsman William Edney to make the gates which remain today. When she died in 1746 her son James Wigley (1700-1965) who was a member of parliament became the owner. James married in 1746 Martha Ebourn (1718-1774) who was the daughter and heir of Richard Ebourn of Allesley. However the couple had no children. When he died in 1765 he left Scaptoft Hall to Martha and when she died in 1774 it went to James’s great nephew Edward Hartopp (1757-1808). He later changed his name to Edward Hartopp Wigley. In 1792 the historian John Throsby visited Scraptoft Hall to make an engraving which was included in his book called “Select views in Leicestershire, from original drawings”. The engraving is shown.

When Edward died in 1808 his son Edward Hartopp Wigley (1783-1813) became the owner of the house. When he died five years later in 1813 his son Edward Bourchier Hartopp (1808-1884) inherited the Hall. He was a member of parliament. When he died in 1884 the Hall was left to his granddaughter Florence Honoria Hartopp (1864-1960).

Florence married in 1894 Captain James Burns (1862-1954) who was the son of John William Burns of Kilmalew, County Dumbarton. After their marriage he changed his name to James Burns Hartopp. The family lived for some time at Scraptoft Hall. A single-storey music room was added to the south-east corner soon after 1896. The 1901 Census records the family living at the Hall with a butler, a footman, a ladies maid, and seven household staff.

In about 1910 the Hall was sold to Alfred Corah (1850-1924) who was a partner in the family firm of N. Corah & Sons who manufactured hosiery and textiles. He was a talented musician and In 1911 he funded a new organ for Scraptoft Church to commemorate the coronation of King George V. The organ is still in the church today.

When Alfred died in 1924 Bert William Cole (1885-1963) became the owner of the Hall. He and his wife Edith lived there until 1941. He then sold it to Currys Ltd. He retained 500 acres of adjacent land which he continued to farm. His wife died in 1941 and in 1960 he donated five acres of the land to the Scraptoft Council which was to be called the Edith Cole Memorial Park. In 1954 the Leicester Corporation purchased the site for the new Leicester College of Education.
