= Sir Francis Henry Drake, 5th Baronet =

English Master of the Household and Member of Parliament

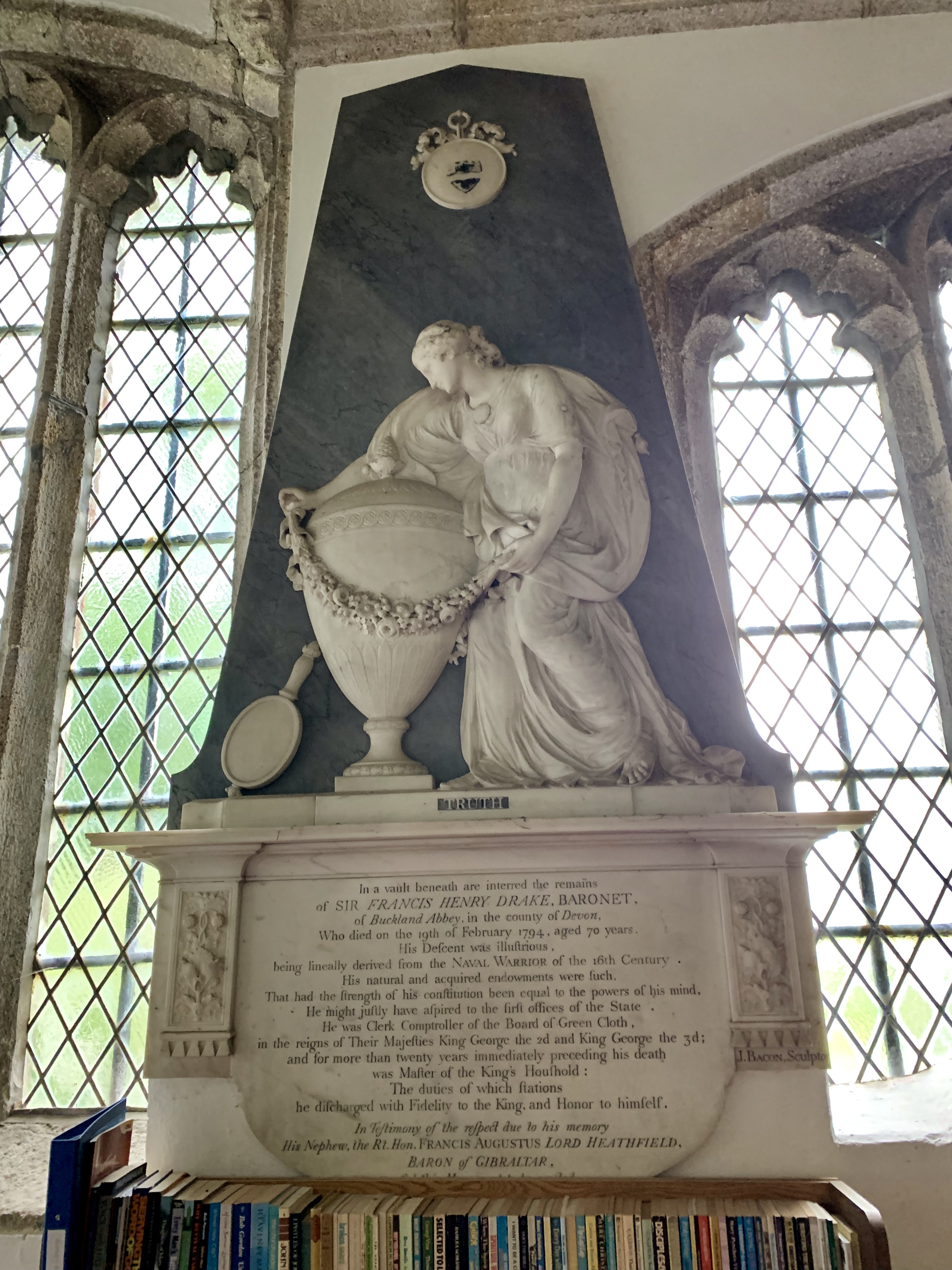
Memorial by John Bacon, Senior in St Andrew's Church, Buckland Monachorum

Sir Francis Henry Drake, 5th Baronet (29 August 1723 – 19 February 1794) was an English Master of the Household and Member of Parliament.

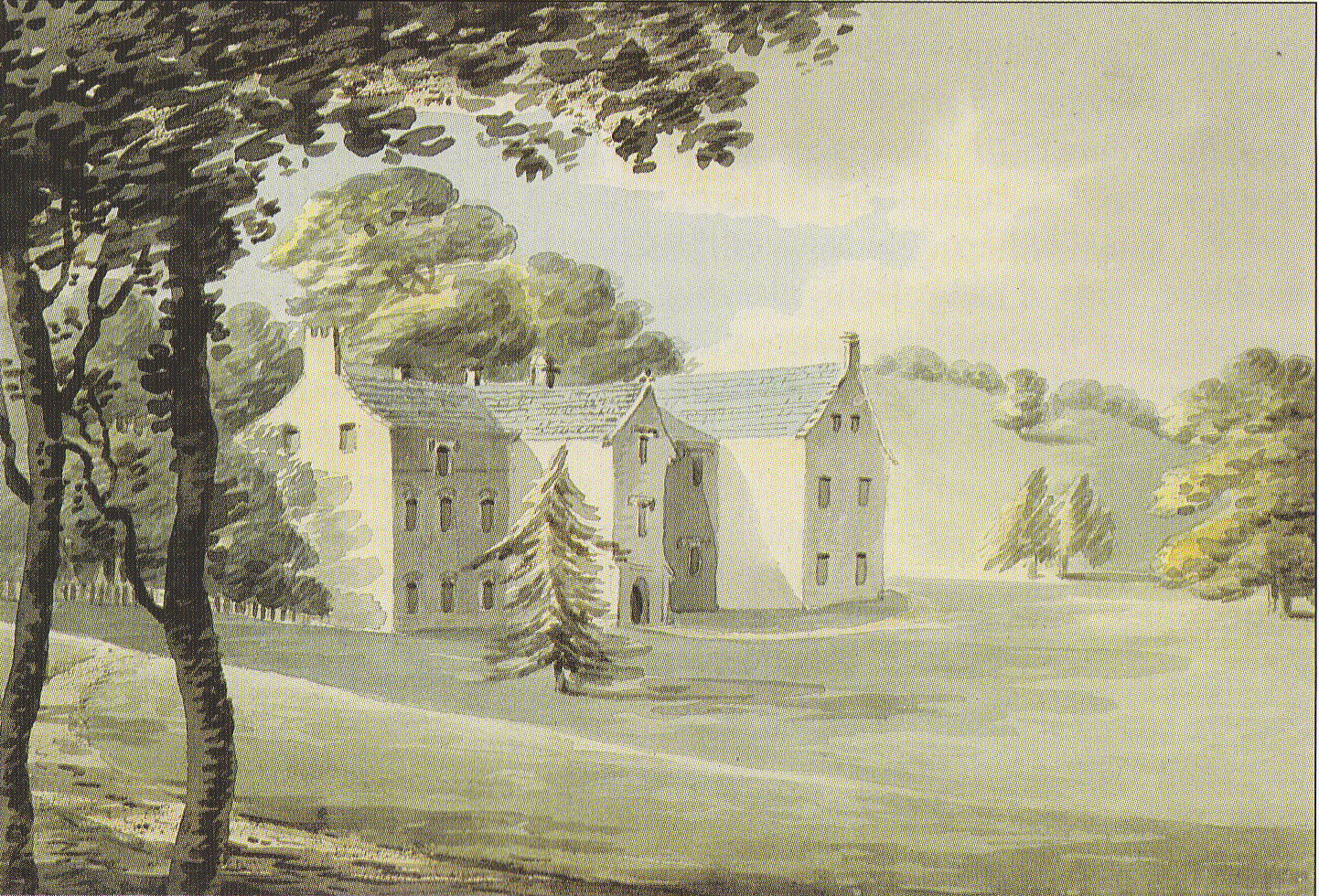
Nutwell Court, before rebuilding in 1799

He was born the eldest son of Sir Francis Drake, 4th Baronet, whom he succeeded in 1740. He was educated at Winchester School (1734–39), Eton College (1740) and Corpus Christi College, Cambridge 1740–44. He then studied law at Lincoln's Inn (1740).

He was a Ranger of Dartmoor Forest for life from 1752. He served as a Clerk of the Green Cloth from 1753 to 1770, rising from second clerk comptroller to first clerk and then as Master of the Household from 1771 to his death.

He represented Bere Alston as a Member of Parliament from 1747 to 1771 and from 1774 to 1780.

He lived at Nutwell Court on the south coast of Devon. He was said by Hoskins (1954) "to have wrecked the fine medieval house with his improvements demolishing the two-storied gatehouse with great difficulty in 1755-6 and cutting through the timbered roof of the 14th century chapel to make a plaster ceiling".

He died unmarried in 1794 and the baronetcy became extinct. He bequeathed almost his whole fortune, including his Nutwell estate and his other lands, to his nephew Francis Augustus Eliott, 2nd Baron Heathfield, the son of his sister Anne Pollexfen Drake and her husband, George Augustus Eliott, 1st Baron Heathfield.

Parliament of Great Britain
| Preceded by Francis William Drake; Hon. George Hobart | Member of Parliament for Bere Alston; 1774–1780; With: Hon. George Hobart | Succeeded by Lord Algernon Percy; Lord Macartney |
| Preceded by Samuel Heathcote; Sir William Harbord, Bt | Member of Parliament for Bere Alston; 1747–1771; With: Sir William Harbord, Bt; John Bristow; Hon. George Hobart | Succeeded by Francis William Drake; Hon. George Hobart |
Court offices
| Preceded by Hon Henry Thynne | Master of the Household; 1771–1794 | Succeeded by Sir Henry Strachey, Bt |
Baronetage of England
| Preceded by Francis Drake | Baronet (of Buckland); 1740–1794 | Extinct |
