= Sir Charles Hotham-Thompson, 8th Baronet =

British Army officer and Member of Parliament

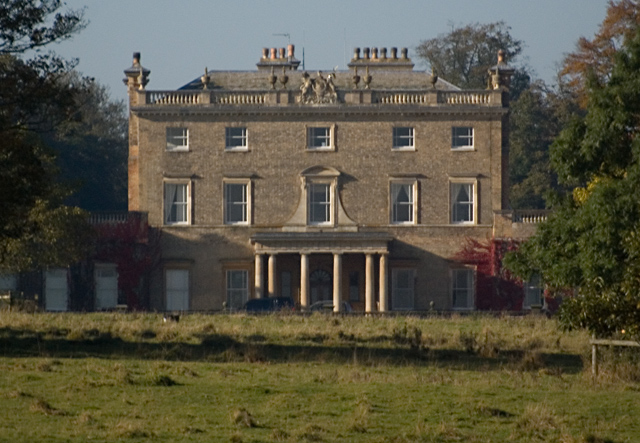
Dalton Hall

General Sir Charles Hotham-Thompson, 8th Baronet (18 June 1729 – 25 January 1794) was a British Army officer and Member of Parliament.

He was the eldest son of Sir Beaumont Hotham, 7th Bt., of Beverley, in the East Riding of Yorkshire. He was educated at Westminster School (1741–5) and studied law at the Middle Temple (1742). He was commissioned into the Army as an ensign in the 1st Foot Guards in 1746.

He served with the regiment in Flanders, where he took part in the Battle of Lauffeld in 1747 and was appointed aide-de-camp to the Earl of Albemarle, commander of the British forces in the Low Countries. During the Seven Years' War (1754–63) he was firstly aide-de-camp to Lord Ligonier and then adjutant to the British forces fighting on the continent. He was promoted to colonel in 1762 and given the colonelcy of the 63rd (West Suffolk) Regiment of Foot in 1765.

From 1761 to 1768 he was also the Member of Parliament for St Ives and in 1763 was made a Groom of the Bedchamber.

In 1768 he transferred as colonel to the 15th Regiment of Foot and retired to Yorkshire, where he succeeded his father in 1771 to the baronetcy and his estate near Beverley. He took the additional name of Thompson on inheriting the Thompson estates in Yorkshire from his wife's family in 1772 (reverting to Hotham in 1787) and commissioned Thomas Atkinson of York to rebuild Dalton Hall between 1771 and 1775. He was knighted KB in 1772.

Promoted Major-General in 1772, he retired from the Army in 1775, was gazetted full general (as Sir Charles Thompson, Bt) in 1793 and died at Dalton Hall in 1794. He had married Lady Dorothy Hobart, the daughter of John Hobart, 1st Earl of Buckinghamshire, and had one daughter. He was succeeded as baronet by his brother Sir John Hotham, 9th Baronet.

Military offices
Preceded by Sir Richard Pierson	Colonel of the 63rd Regiment of Foot; 1765–1768	Succeeded by Francis Grant
Preceded by Sir Jeffery Amherst	Colonel of the 15th Regiment of Foot; 1768–1775	Succeeded by The Earl of Cavan
Parliament of Great Britain
Preceded by George Hobart; James Whitshed	Member of Parliament for St Ives; 1761–1768; With: Humphrey Mackworth Praed	Succeeded by Thomas Durrant; Adam Drummond
Baronetage of England
Preceded by Beaumont Hotham	Baronet (of Scorborough); 1771–1794	Succeeded by John Hotham
