= Philip Cavendish =

Admiral Philip Cavendish
- Born: Unknown
- Died: 14 June 1743
- Military career
- Allegiance: Great Britain
- Branch: Royal Navy
- Service years: 1694–1743
- Rank: Admiral of the Blue
- Commands: Commander-in-Chief, Portsmouth

Admiral Philip Cavendish (died 1743) of Westbury, Hampshire, was a Royal Navy officer and politician who sat in the House of Commons between 1721 and 1743. He went on to be Commander-in-Chief, Portsmouth.

== Biography ==
Cavendish was the illegitimate son of William Cavendish, 1st Duke of Devonshire M.P . He joined the navy and was a lieutenant RN in 1694 and captain in 1701. From 1705, he was porter of St James's Palace. He married Anne Carteret, daughter of Edward Carteret. In 1719, he led a British squadron at the Battle of Cape St Vincent.

Cavendish was put forward to succeed his father-in-law, Edward Carteret, as Member of Parliament for Bere Alston on the Hobart interest. He was elected at a by-election on 29 April 1721 but was unseated on petition on 6 June 1721. He was returned unopposed as MP for St. Germans on the Government interest at the 1722 general election. He did not obtain a seat at the 1727 general election although his father-in-law tried to put him forward for Harwich. In 1728 he became a rear-admiral, and in 1732 a vice-admiral.

At the 1734 election, Cavendish was returned unopposed with Sir Charles Wager as MP for Portsmouth on the Admiralty interest. He voted consistently with the Government. In 1736 he was promoted to Admiral and was also promoted to serjeant-porter of St James's Palace, holding the office for the rest of his life. At the 1741 general election he was elected in a contest as MP for Portsmouth. After Walpole's fall he was appointed a Lord Commissioner of the Admiralty as a naval member of Board of Admiralty in March 1742 and was classed as ‘for Pelham’ in October 1742.

Cavendish died without issue on 14 July 1743.

== Flag rank appointments ==
Included:

- 1727–1728, Rear-Admiral of the Blue
- 1728–1729, Rear-Admiral of the White
- 1729–1732, Rear-Admiral of the Red
- 1732–1733 Vice-Admiral of the Blue
- 1733–1735 Vice-Admiral of the Red
- 1735–1743 Admiral of the Blue

Parliament of Great Britain
| Preceded by Lawrence Carter; Edward Carteret | Member of Parliament for Bere Alston; 1721; With: Lawrence Carter | Succeeded by Lawrence Carter; St John Brodrick |
| Preceded by Lord Stanhope; John Knight | Member of Parliament for St Germans; 1722–1727; With: Lord Binning | Succeeded by Sir Gilbert Heathcote; Sidney Godolphin |
| Preceded by Sir Charles Wager; Sir John Norris | Member of Parliament for Portsmouth; 1734–1743; With: Thomas Lewis 1734–1737; Charles Stewart 1737–1741; Edward Vernon 1741; Martin Bladen 1741–1743 | Succeeded by Martin Bladen; Sir Charles Hardy |
