= Sir Francis Drake, 4th Baronet =

British landowner and politician

Sir Francis Henry Drake, 4th Baronet (1694–1740) of Buckland Abbey, Devon was a British landowner and politician who sat in the House of Commons from 1715 to 1740.

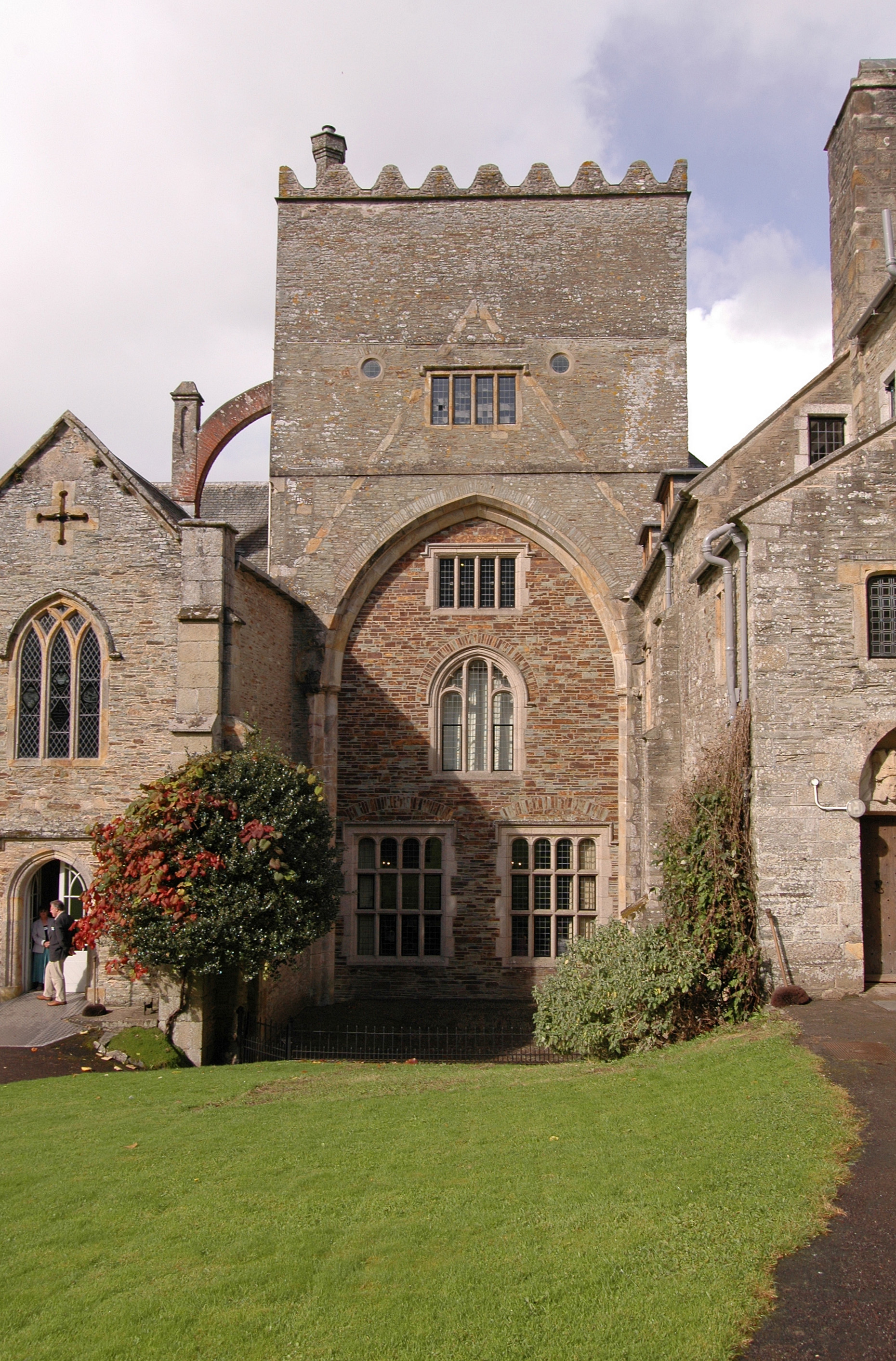
Buckland Abbey tower

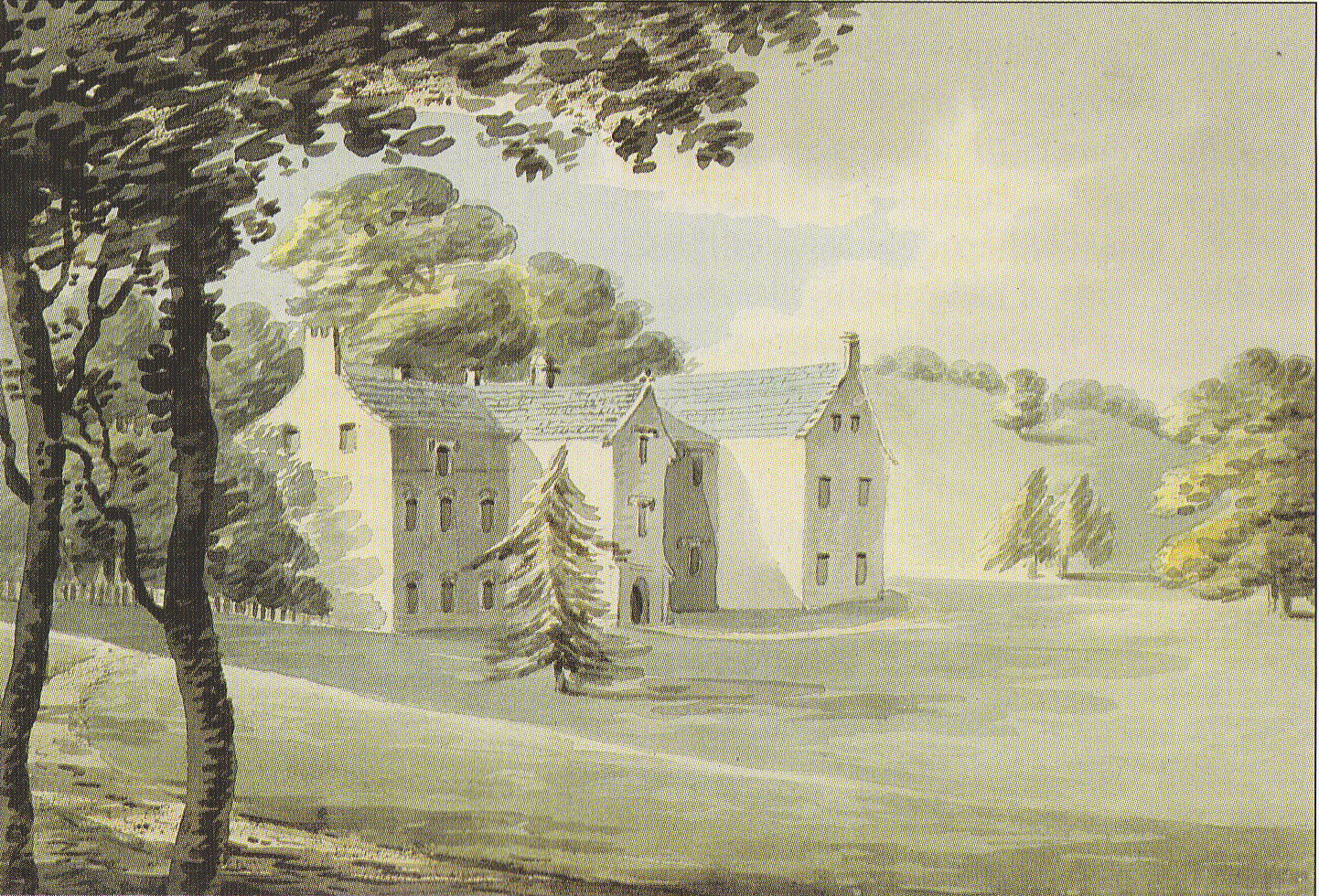
Nutwell Court before 1800

== Early life ==
Drake was the eldest surviving son of Sir Francis Drake, 3rd Baronet and his third wife. Elizabeth Pollexfen, daughter of Sir Henry Pollexfen of Nutwell Court, Devon, and was baptized on 2 March 1694. He was educated privately. Drake's father died in January 1718 and he succeeded to the baronetcy and the heavily encumbered estate. He made a financially advantageous marriage to Anne Heathcote, daughter of Samuel Heathcote merchant of Clapton House, Hackney, Middlesex on 29 September 1720 and was able to pay off the debts with his wife's money. She was the sister of Sir William Heathcote, 1st Baronet. He succeeded his uncle Henry Pollexfen to the estate of Nutwell Court in 1732.

== Career ==
At the 1715 general election Drake was returned as Member of Parliament for Tavistock jointly on his own and the Bedford interest. He was returned unopposed at Tavistock in 1722 and 1727. He was also returned in 1727 for Bere Alston where the family controlled one seat, but chose to sit for Tavistock. The new Duke of Bedford did not support him at Tavistock at the 1734 general election and he was defeated. However, he was returned for Bere Alston again and took his seat there until his death.

== Death and legacy ==
Drake died of pleuritic fever at his lodgings at Covent Garden on 26 January 1740. Lady Ann Drake was buried at Hackney on 5 November 1768. They had three sons

- Sir Francis Henry Drake, 5th Baronet who succeeded to the baronetcy
- Francis William Drake, who married his first cousin, Sir William Heathcote's daughter, Elizabeth in 1763.
- Sir Francis Samuel Drake, 1st Baronet who became a baronet in his own right

They also had two daughters

Parliament of Great Britain
Preceded by Sir John Cope, Bt; James Bulteel	Member of Parliament for Tavistock; 1715–1734; With: Sir John Cope, Bt 1715-1728; Sir Humphrey Monoux, Bt 1728-1734	Succeeded by Hon. Charles Fane; Sidney Meadows
Preceded by Sir Robert Rich; St John Brodrick	Member of Parliament for Bere Alston; 1727; With: Sir John Hobart	Succeeded by Sir Archer Croft; Lord Walden
Preceded by Sir Archer Croft; William Morden	Member of Parliament for Bere Alston; 1734–1740; With: John Bristow	Succeeded by Samuel Heathcote; John Bristow
Baronetage of England
Preceded by Francis Drake	Baronet (of Buckland); 1718-1740	Succeeded by Francis Drake
