= George Hobart, 3rd Earl of Buckinghamshire =

British politician (1731–1804)

The Right Honourable The Earl of Buckinghamshire
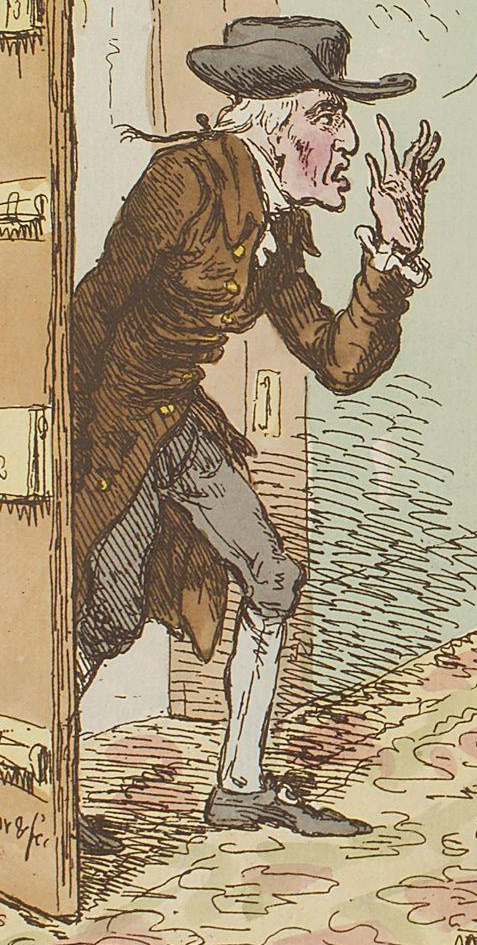
- Detail from a 1797 cartoon depicting Buckinghamshire

Member of Parliament for Bere Alston
- In office 1761–1780 Serving with Sir Francis Drake, Francis William Drake, Sir Francis Drake
- Preceded by: Sir Francis Drake; John Bristow
- Succeeded by: The Lord Macartney; Lord Algernon Percy

Member of Parliament for St Ives
- In office 1754–1761 Serving with James Whitshed
- Preceded by: John Bristow; Samuel Stephens
- Succeeded by: Humphrey Mackworth Praed; Charles Hotham

Personal details
- Born: George Hobart; 8 September 1731
- Died: 14 November 1804 (aged 73)
- Spouse: Albinia Bertie (m. 1757; died 1804)
- Relations: Edward Cromwell Disbrowe (grandson)
- Children: 8
- Parent(s): John Hobart, 1st Earl of Buckinghamshire; Elizabeth Bristow.
- Education: Westminster School; University of Göttingen

George Hobart, 3rd Earl of Buckinghamshire (8 September 1731 – 14 November 1804), styled The Honourable George Hobart from 1733 until 1793, was a British politician who represented St Ives and Bere Alston in the House of Commons of Great Britain from 1754 to 1780.

== Early life ==
Hobart was the son of John Hobart, 1st Earl of Buckinghamshire by his second wife, Elizabeth Bristow. From his parents' marriage, he had a younger brother, Hon. Henry Hobart, who served as MP for Norwich.

His paternal grandparents were Sir Henry Hobart, 4th Baronet of Blickling and the former Elizabeth Maynard (eldest daughter of Sir Joseph Maynard). His maternal grandparents were Elizabeth Woolley and Robert Bristow, MP for Winchelsea.

He was educated at Westminster School and visited the University of Göttingen.

== Career ==
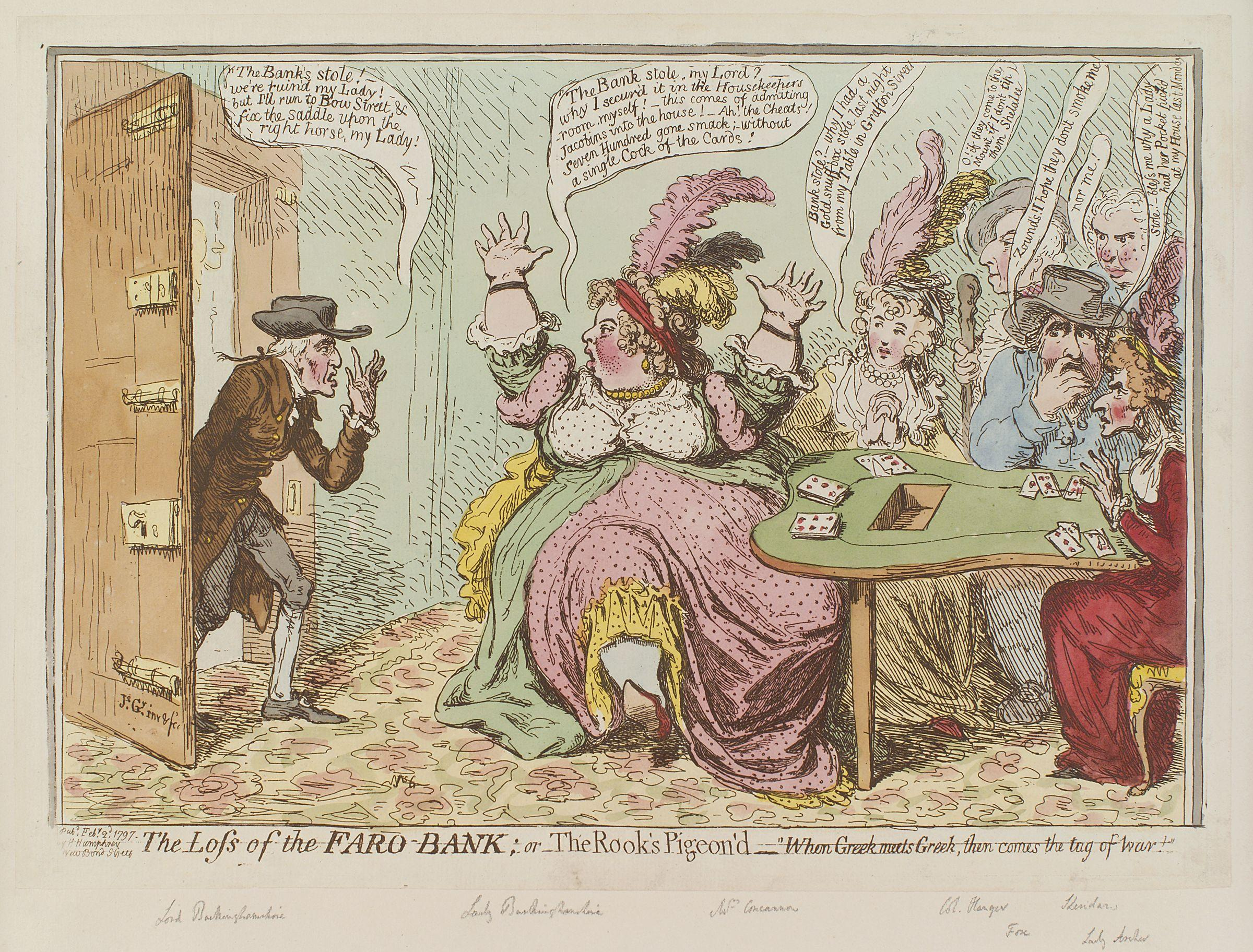
The Loss of the Faro Bank (James Gillray, 1797). Buckinghamshire brings the news that the "Faro Bank" has been stolen to gamblers including his wife, popularly thought to exploit the gullible.

Hobart represented the constituencies of St Ives and Bere Alston in the House of Commons from 1754 to 1761 and 1761 to 1780, respectively. He was secretary to the embassy in St Petersburg in 1762, his half-brother John Hobart, 2nd Earl of Buckinghamshire being then ambassador.

He inherited the earldom of Buckinghamshire from his half-brother, who had no surviving sons, in 1793. On 29 April 1797, he was commissioned colonel of the 3rd Regiment of Lincolnshire Militia (South Lincolnshire Supplementary Militia), becoming a colonel in the regular army when his regiment was embodied on 12 January 1799.

== Personal life ==
On 16 May 1757, Hobart married Albinia Bertie, second daughter of Lord Vere Bertie and the heiress Ann Casey. They had eight children:

- Robert Hobart, 4th Earl of Buckinghamshire (1760–1816), who married Margaretta Bourke. After her death in 1796, he married Hon. Eleanor Eden, daughter of William Eden, 1st Baron Auckland, in 1799.
- Hon. George Vere Hobart (1761–1802), who married Jane Cattaneo. After her death, he married Janet Maclean in April 1802.
- Hon. Charles Hobart (d. 1782), a Lt. in the Royal Navy.
- Hon. Henry Lewis Hobart (1774–1846), a Reverend who married Charlotte Selina Moore.
- Lady Albinia Hobart, who married Richard Cumberland in 1784.
- Lady Henrietta Anne Barbara Hobart (c. 1762–1828), who married John Sullivan in 1789.
- Lady Maria Frances Hobart (c. 1762–1794), who married George North, 3rd Earl of Guilford.
- Lady Charlotte Hobart (d. 1798), who married Col. Edward Disbrowe.

Lord Buckinghamshire died on 14 November 1804 and was succeeded by his son, Robert, who had already entered the House of Lords in 1798 by a writ of acceleration as Baron Hobart.

Parliament of Great Britain
Preceded by John Bristow; Samuel Stephens	Member of Parliament for St Ives; 1754–1761; With: James Whitshed	Succeeded by Humphrey Mackworth Praed; Charles Hotham
Preceded by Sir Francis Drake; John Bristow	Member of Parliament for Bere Alston; 1761–1780; With: Sir Francis Drake 1761–1771; Francis William Drake 1771–1774; Sir Francis Drake 1774–1780	Succeeded by The Lord Macartney; Lord Algernon Percy
Peerage of Great Britain
Preceded by John Hobart	Earl of Buckinghamshire; 1793–1804	Succeeded by Robert Hobart
Preceded by John Hobart	Baron Hobart (descended by acceleration); 1793–1798	Succeeded by Robert Hobart
