= St John Brodrick (died 1728) =

Anglo-Irish politician (c.1685–1728)

The Honourable St John Brodrick (c. 1685 – 21 February 1728), was an Anglo-Irish politician who sat in the Irish House of Commons from 1709 to 1728 and in the British House of Commons from 1721 to 1727.

Brodrick was a son of Alan Brodrick, 1st Viscount Midleton and brother of Alan Brodrick, 2nd Viscount Midleton; his mother was his father's first wife, Catherine Barry, daughter of Redmond Barry of Rathcormac. He predeceased his father by some months.

== Career ==
Brodrick was sent to Eton College in 1698. He was subsequently admitted fellow-commoner at King's College, Cambridge in 1699/1700, and as a student of the Middle Temple on 17 June 1700.

Brodrick represented Castlemartyr in the Irish House of Commons from 1709 to 1713, Cork City from 1713 to 1715 and then County Cork from 1715 to his death. On 9 June 1724, he was appointed to the Irish Privy Council. He was also returned as Member of Parliament for Bere Alston on petition on 6 June 1721 after a by-election and returned unopposed at the 1722 general election.

As an MP he embarrassed his father by voting regularly against the government. Lord Midleton tried to brush over the matter in his private correspondence by excusing his son as a headstrong young man, not easily controlled even by his formidable father, whose bad temper was notorious.

== Personal life ==
With his wife Anne Hill, daughter of Michael Hill of Hillsborough and sister of Trevor Hill, 1st Viscount Hillsborough and Arthur Hill-Trevor, 1st Viscount Dungannon, he had at least four daughters. One, Anne, married James Jefferyes of Blarney Castle, son of Sir James Jeffreys and father of James St John Jeffreyes. Another, Mary, married Sir John Redmond Freke, 3rd Baronet.

Parliament of Great Britain
Preceded by Lawrence Carter; Philip Cavendish	Member of Parliament for Bere Alston; 1721–1727; With: Lawrence Carter 1721-1722; Sir John Hobart 1722-1724; Sir Robert Rich 1724-1727	Succeeded by Sir John Hobart; Sir Francis Henry Drake
