= George Wrighte =

British landowner and Tory politician

George Wrighte (c.1706–1766), of Gayhurst House, Buckinghamshire, and Brooksby Hall, near Leicester was a British landowner and Tory politician who sat in the House of Commons for 39 years from 1727 to 1766.

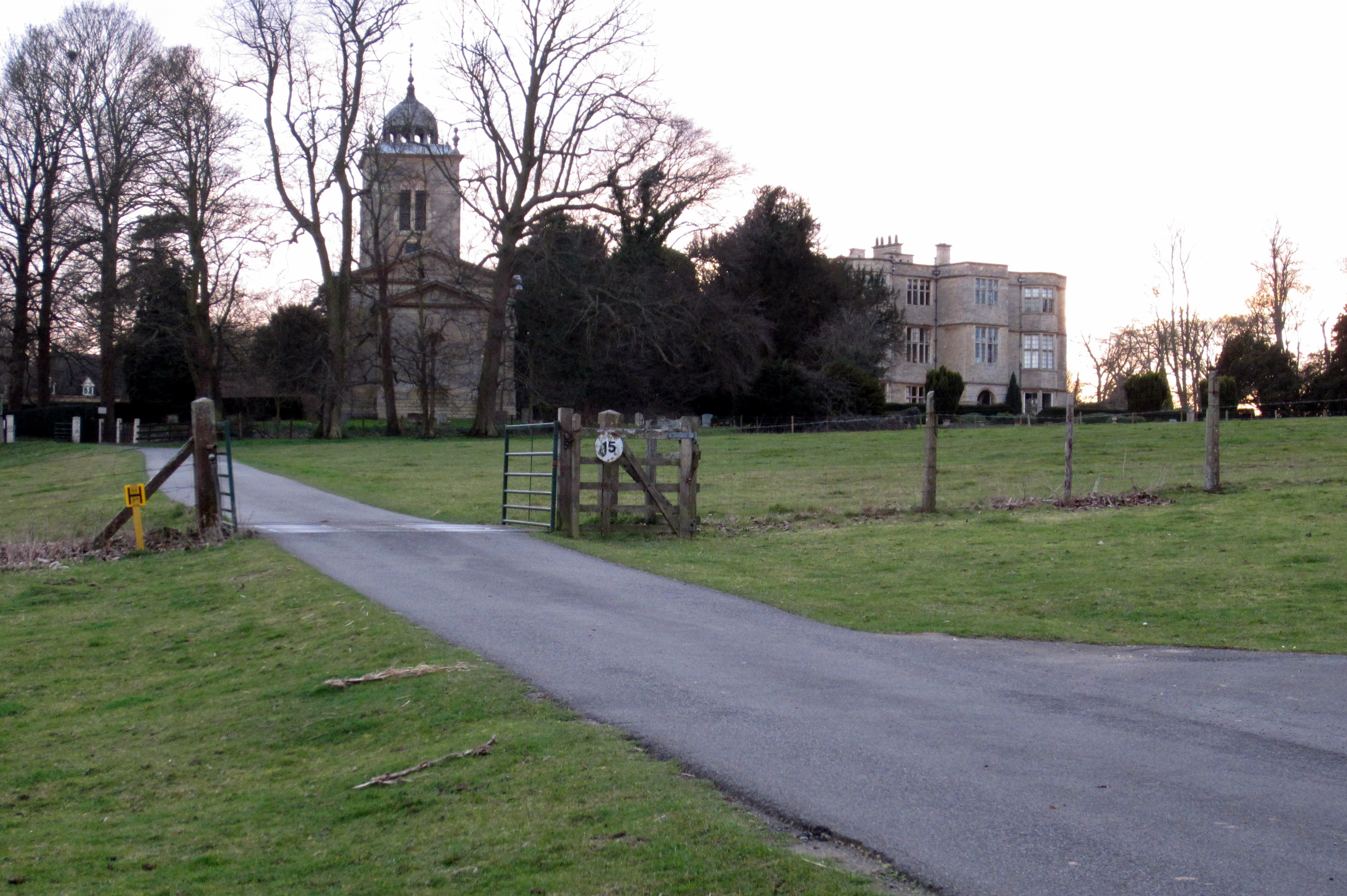
Gayhurst House

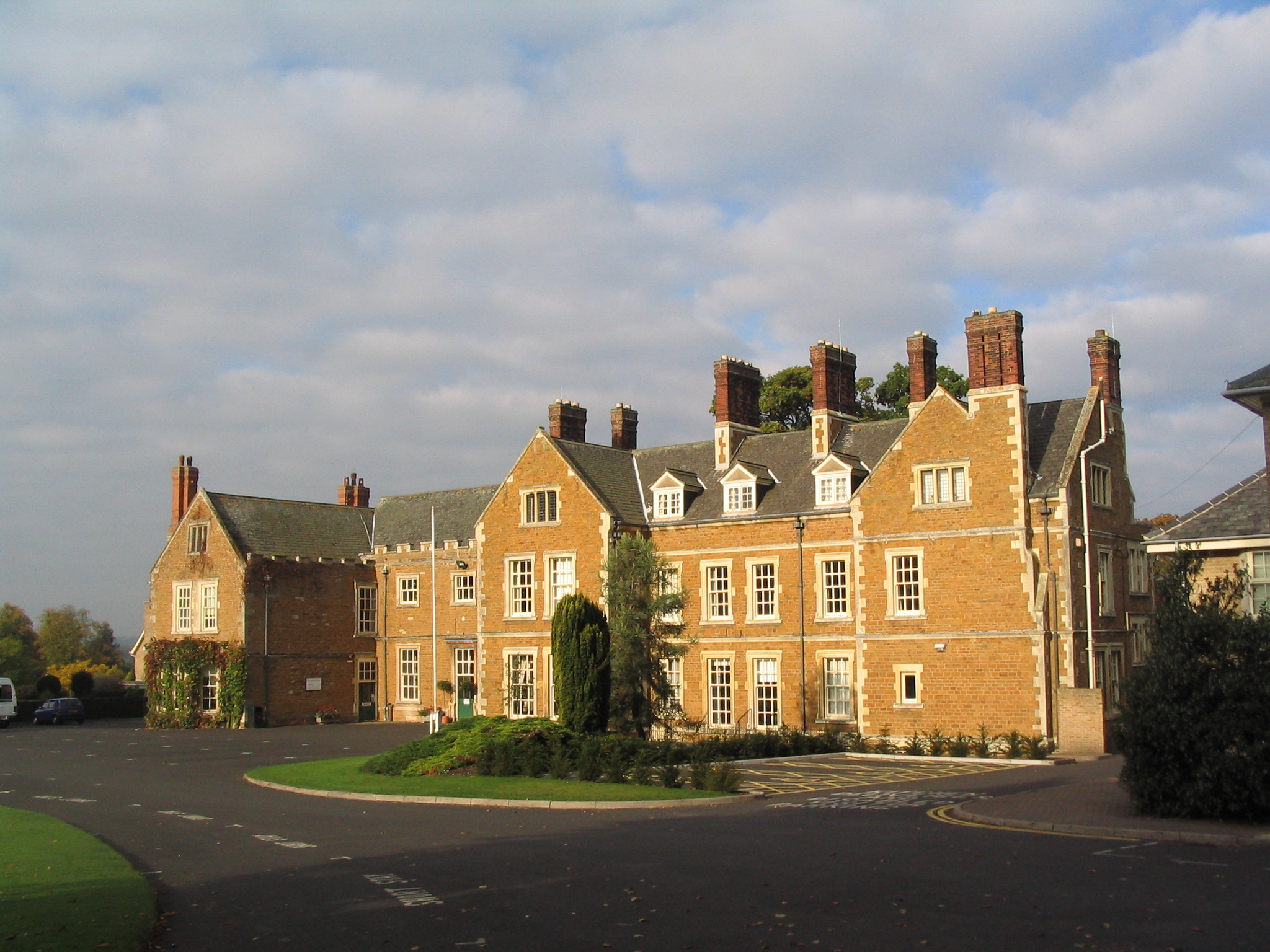
Brooksby Hall

Wrighte was the eldest surviving son of George Wrighte of Gayhurst and Brooksby, clerk of the Crown in Chancery, and his wife Mary Bedford, daughter of Thomas Bedford of Doctors’ Commons, register of Admiralty. His grandfather was Sir Nathan Wrighte keeper of the great seal. He was admitted to Inner Temple in 1715 and at Emmanuel College, Cambridge in 1724. In 1725, he succeeded his father to Gayhurst and Brooksby. He married Barbara Clarges, daughter of Sir Thomas Clarges, 2nd Baronet, MP of Aston, Hertfordshire in May 1733.

Wrighte was returned as a Tory Member of Parliament for Leicester on the corporation interest at the 1727 British general election. He voted consistently against the Administration. He was returned as MP again in a contest at the 1734 British general election. His only recorded speech was made on 5 May 1738 in a debate on the Spanish depredations in America, when he exonerated the Spanish government from responsibility and deprecated measures likely to provoke Spain into war. On the motion for the dismissal of Walpole in February 1741, he was one of the Tories who withdrew. He was returned unopposed for Leicester in 1741 and 1747.

Wrighte was returned at Leicester on the corporation interest at the 1754 British general election after a fierce contest. At the 1761 British general election he was returned unopposed.

Wrighte died on 27 January 1766, leaving a son George who inherited the estates and a daughter Barbara.

Parliament of Great Britain
Preceded by Thomas Boothby-Skrymsher; Sir George Beaumont	Member of Parliament for Leicester; 1727– 1766; With: Sir George Beaumont 1727-1737; James Wigley 1737-1765; Anthony James Keck 1765-1766	Succeeded by John Darker; Anthony James Keck
