= Samuel Heathcote =

British politician

Samuel Heathcote (11 February 1699 – 1775) of Hanover Square, London was a British politician who sat in the House of Commons from 1740 to 1747.

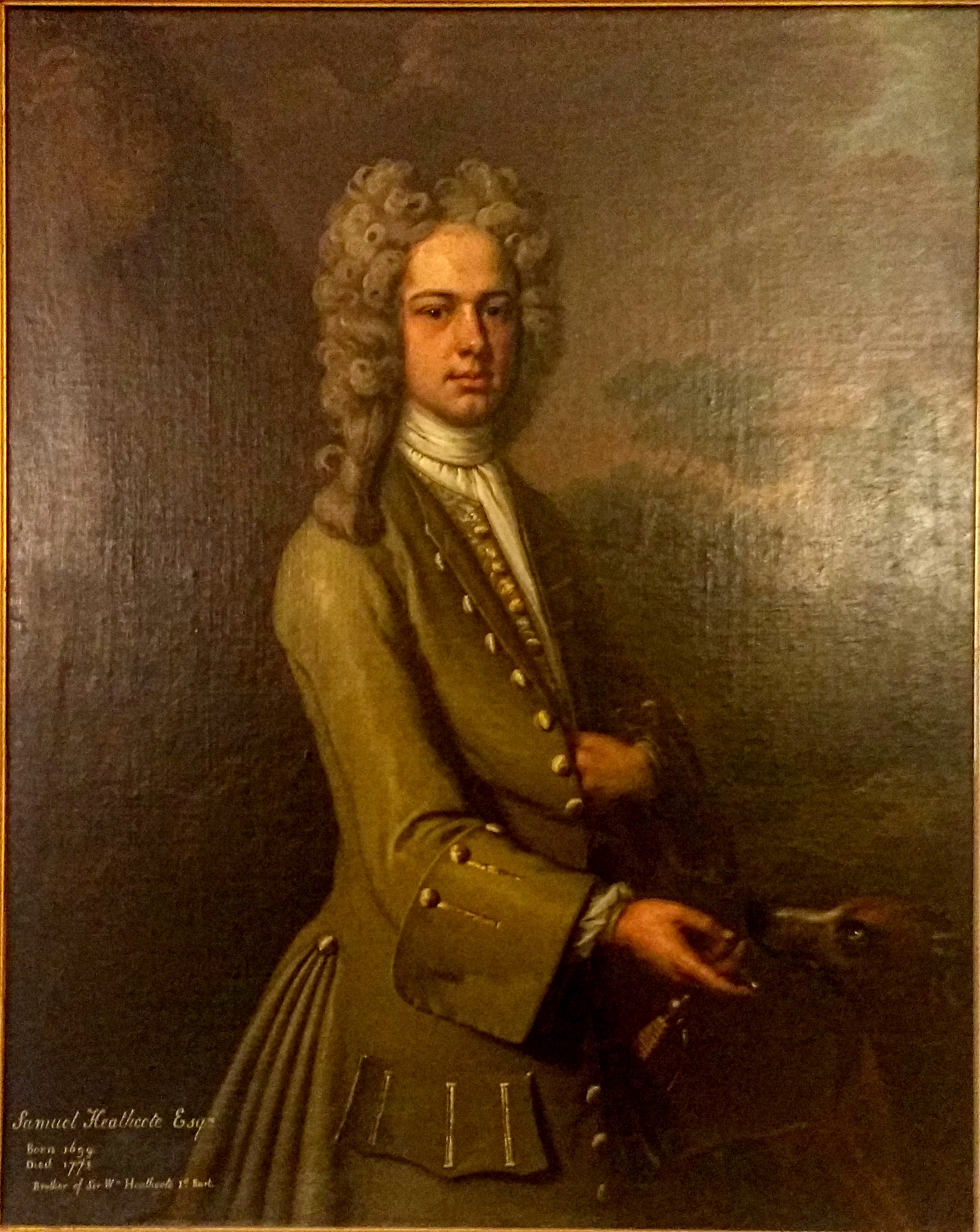
Samuel Heatcote (1699-1775)

Heathcote was the fourth son of Samuel Heathcote of Hackney. His elder brother was Sir William Heathcote. He married Elizabeth Holworthy, daughter of Matthew Holworthy of Hackney on 3 May 1720. She died on. 6 May 1726 and he married as his second wife Frances, a French lady, in about 1729.

Heathcote was brought in as Member of Parliament for Bere Alston by his sister Anne, the widow of Sir Francis Drake, 4th Baronet, the late Member, at a by-election on 22 February 1740. At the 1741 British general election, Heathcote was returned unopposed for Bere Alston. He steadily supported the Administration. At the 1747 British general election he was replaced by his nephew, Sir Francis Drake, who had come of age by then. He did not stand again.

Heathcote died on 31 March 1775 leaving four sons and three daughters by his second wife.

In 1721 he raped Elizabeth Holworthy's 15 year old sister, who subsequently died giving birth to their son, Elizabeth divorced him. https://manfamily.org/about/other-families/holworthy-family/

Parliament of Great Britain
| Preceded by Sir Francis Henry Drake, 4th Bt; John Bristow | Member of Parliament for Bere Alston; 1740–1747; With: John Bristow 1740-1741; Sir William Morden 1741-1747 | Succeeded by Sir Francis Henry Drake, 5th Bt; Sir William Morden |
