= Lawrence Carter (1641–1710) =

English lawyer and politician

Lawrence Carter (c. 1641 – 1 June 1710) of Leicester, was an English lawyer and politician.

He was born in June 1641, the eldest son of Lawrence Carter and Eleanor Pollard. The Carters were prosperous gentleman farmers in Paulerspury, Northamptonshire, but young Lawrence was destined for a legal career. He was educated at Clement's Inn and articled to Thomas Wadland, an attorney in Leicester, whose daughter Elizabeth he married. The couple had two sons before Elizbeth's death in 1671. In 1675 he remarried, to Mary Potter of London, with whom he had two sons and four daughters.

Carter became man of business to the earls of Huntingdon and Stamford, and when a new charter was issued to Leicester (following a writ of quo warranto) Carter became the town's Recorder. He was one of the first to kiss hands with James II, securing letters patent from the new monarch for the rights to provide his home town with a piped water from the Soar, which he did at a cost of £4000 (equivalent to £771,000 in 2023).

Elected unopposed to represent the borough of Leicester in 1689, he served for six years. In 1701 he returned to represent the same seat, succeeding his eldest son who was also called Lawrence Carter.

He died on 1 June 1710, aged 69, and was buried at the church of St Mary de Castro, Leicester.

Parliament of England
Preceded by Sir Henry Beaumont; Thomas Babington	Member of Parliament for Leicester; 1689–1695; With: Thomas Babington 1689–1690; Sir Edward Abney 1690–1695	Succeeded by Archdale Palmer; Sir Edward Abney
Preceded by Sir William Villiers; Lawrence Carter	Member of Parliament for Leicester; 1701–1702; With: James Winstanley	Succeeded by James Winstanley; Sir George Beaumont
