= Edward Carteret =

English politician

Postmaster General of the United Kingdom
- In office 1720–1739

Member of Parliament for Bere Alston
- In office 1717–1721

Member of Parliament for Bedford
- In office 1702–1705

Member of Parliament for Huntingdon
- In office 1698–1701

Personal details
- Born: 1671
- Died: 15 April 1739 (aged 67–68)
- Spouse: Bridget Exton (m. 1699)
- Children: 6
- Parent: Philip Carteret (father)
- Relatives: George Carteret (brother)
- Education: Trinity College, Cambridge

Edward Carteret (1671 – 15 April 1739) was an English politician and served as Postmaster General from 1721 until his death.

== Life ==
Edward Carteret was the third son of Philip Carteret FRS of Hawnes and younger brother of George Carteret, 1st Baron Carteret. He was educated at Brentwood School and Trinity College, Cambridge.

Carteret was returned as Member of Parliament for Huntingdon in 1698 and for Bedford in 1702. He was returned as MP for Bere Alston at a by-election on 9 December 1717 and resigned in 1720 when he was made Postmaster General. He was Joint Postmaster General from 1721 to 1732, Postmaster General from 1732 to 1733 and Joint Postmaster General again from 1732 to his death.

In 1699, he had married Bridget Exton, the daughter of Sir Thomas Exton, M.P., Dean of the Arches court of Canterbury and judge of the Admiralty. They had 3 sons and 3 daughters. Carteret died from the stone, suddenly on 15 April 1739.

Parliament of England
Preceded by John Pocklington; Francis Wortley Montagu	Member of Parliament for Huntingdon; 1698–1701; With: Francis Wortley Montagu	Succeeded by Charles Boyle; Francis Wortley Montagu
Preceded by William Farrer; William Spencer	Member of Parliament for Bedford; 1702–1705; With: William Spencer	Succeeded by William Farrer; Sir Philip Monoux, Bt
Parliament of Great Britain
Preceded by Horatio Walpole; Lawrence Carter	Member of Parliament for Bere Alston; 1717–1721 with Lawrence Carter	Succeeded by Philip Cavendish; Lawrence Carter
Political offices
Preceded by The Lord Cornwallis; James Craggs	Postmaster General; 1720–1739; With: Galfridus Walpole 1720–1725; Edward Harrison 1725–1733; The Lord Lovel 1733–1739	Succeeded by Sir John Eyles; The Lord Lovel
