= Archdale Palmer (MP) =

British lawyer, landowner and Whig politician

Archdale Palmer (1661–15 September 1732) was a British lawyer, landowner and Whig politician.

Palmer was baptised on 3 December 1661, the eldest son of William Palmer of Wanlip Hall and his wife Elizabeth Danvers. He was educated at Gray's Inn from 1679, and called to the bar in 1688. He was elected a Member of Parliament for Leicester in the general election of 1695, and was a consistent supporter of the government for the three years he spent there. He stood down for the 1698 election, but continued to support the Whig cause until his death on 15 September 1732 (aged 70).

== Family and descendants ==
Palmer married twice, first on 21 April 1684 to Mary Dawson, with whom he had ten sons and one daughter. Mary died in 1695, and Palmer married Anne Charlton on 15 November 1698. Anne bore him a further nine sons and six daughters.

One of Palmer's granddaughters, Catherine Susanna Palmer (1742–1805), married Sir Charles Hudson, 1st Baronet. Their son, Sir Charles, took the Palmer family name under the terms of his maternal grandfather's will. The Palmers remain major landowners in Wanlip to the present day.

Parliament of England
Preceded by Lawrence Carter; Sir Edward Abney	Member of Parliament for Leicester; 1695–1698; With: Sir Edward Abney	Succeeded by Sir William Villiers; Lawrence Carter
