= Sir George Beaumont, 4th Baronet =

British Tory politician

Sir George Beaumont, 4th Baronet (c. 1664 – 9 April 1737) of Stoughton Grange, Leicestershire was a British Tory politician who sat in the English and British House of Commons for 35 years from 1702 to 1737.

Beaumont was a younger son of Sir Henry Beaumont, 2nd Baronet and his wife Elizabeth Farmer, daughter of George Farmer. He matriculated at New College, Oxford on 9 February 1683, aged 18, and graduated with a Bachelor of Civil Law in 1690 then became a fellow. In the same year he succeeded his older brother Thomas as baronet. In 1713, he was awarded the degree of a Doctor of Civil Law by the University of Oxford.

Beaumont was initially reluctant to enter parliament. However at the first general election of 1701 he allowed himself to be put forward for Oxford University by a group of younger dons. He withdrew before the poll, but when a vacancy arrived shortly afterwards in March he was re-adopted and stood at the by-election. Although defeated, he succeeded in attracting a respectable following. At the second 1701 election he campaigned with a fellow Tory, John Verney, for Leicestershire but stood down before the poll. At the 1702 English general election, he was selected to stand for Leicester and was returned as Member of Parliament in a contest. He was re-elected at the 1705 English general election, and was returned unopposed in 1708 and 1710. In 1712, he was appointed a Commissioner of the Privy Seal. He was returned unopposed for Leicester at the 1713 general election and in 1714 was appointed a Lord of the Admiralty, a post he held only for six months. He was returned again as MP for Leicester in 1715, 1722, 1727 and 1734.

Beaumont died unmarried and childless. He was buried at Stoughton, Leicestershire and was succeeded in the baronetcy by his younger brother Lewis. His memorial was sculpted by Peter Scheemakers.

Parliament of England
Preceded by James Winstanley; Lawrence Carter	Member of Parliament for Leicester; 1702 – 1707; With: James Winstanley	Succeeded by Parliament of Great Britain
Parliament of Great Britain
Preceded by Parliament of England	Member of Parliament for Leicester; 1707 – 1737; With: James Winstanley 1707–1719; Thomas Noble 1719–1722; Sir Lawrence Carter 1722–1727; Thomas Boothby-Skrymsher 1727; George Wrighte 1727–1737	Succeeded by George Wrighte; James Wigley
Baronetage of England
Preceded by Thomas Beaumont	Baronet (of Stoughton Grange); 1690 – 1737	Succeeded by Lewis Beaumont
