= Samuel Stephens (senior) =

Samuel Stephens (died 1794) was a politician and MP for St. Ives between 1752 and 1754. He was responsible for the building of Tregenna Castle.

In June 1762 he married Anne, the only child and heiress of Richard Seaborne of Hereford. He had a son, Samuel, who later also became MP for St. Ives.

Parliament of Great Britain
| Preceded by John Plumptre; John Bristow | Member of Parliament for St Ives; 1751 – 1754; With: John Bristow | Succeeded by Hon. George Hobart; James Whitshed |
