= James Wigley =

British politician

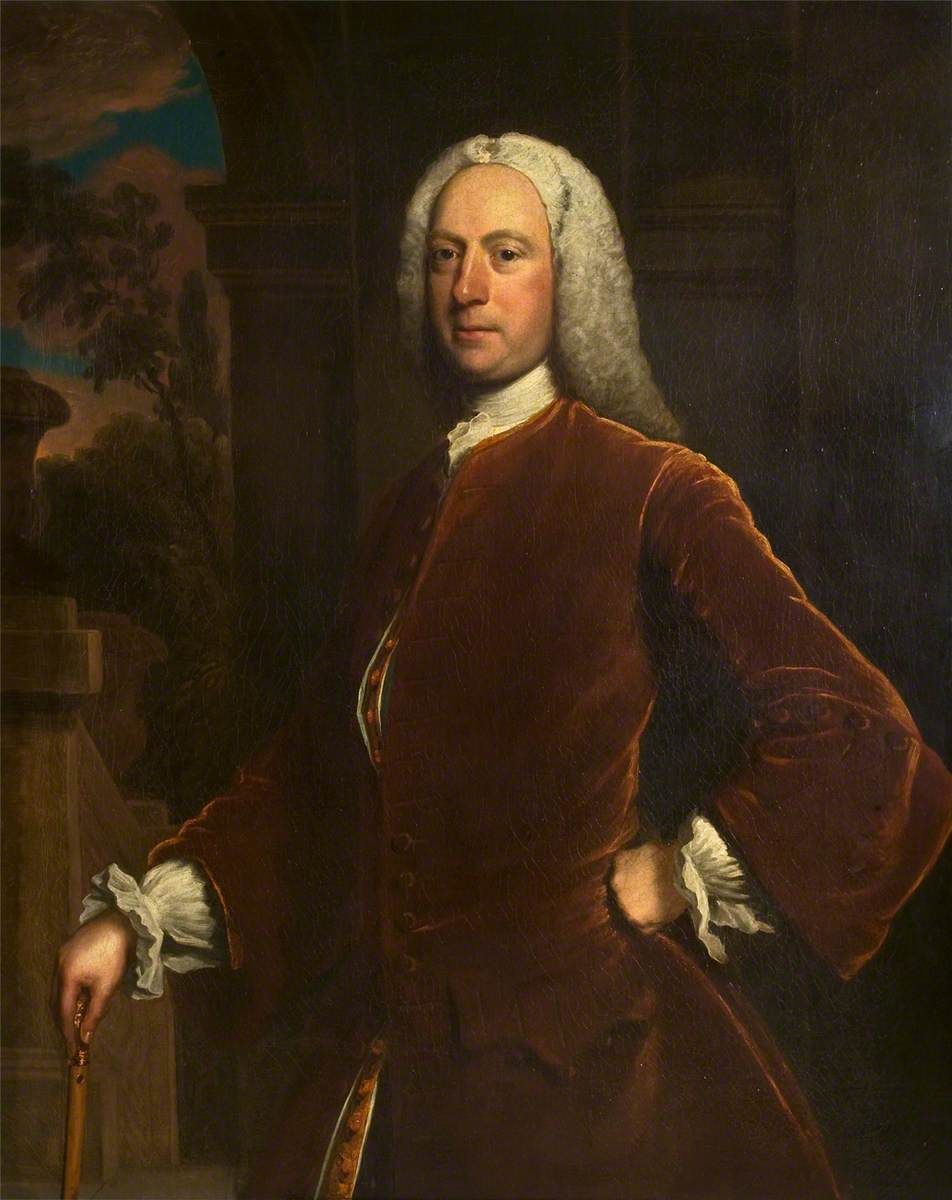
- Wigley, as painted by Joseph Highmore in 1741

Member of Parliament for Leicester
- In office 27 April 1737 – 21 June 1765 Serving with George Wrighte
- Preceded by: George Wrighte; Sir George Beaumont
- Succeeded by: George Wrighte; Anthony James Keck

Personal details
- Born: 10 August 1700
- Died: 21 June 1765 (aged 64)
- Education: Magdalen College, Oxford

James Wigley (10 August 1700 – 21 June 1765) was a British politician.

Born on 10 August 1700, James was the second surviving son of Sir Edward Wigley of Scraptoft Hall and his wife Laetitia Cressey. He was educated at Rugby School, and then Magdalen College, Oxford, matriculating on 20 March 1718 at the age of 17. In 1718, he married Martha, the daughter and heir of Richard Ebourne of Allesley, Warwickshire.

By this time, Wigley had inherited Scraptoft Hall following the death of his father in 1711, and his older brother in 1716. The hall was enlarged and completely remodelled by his mother, Lady Wigley, in 1723, whilst James laid out grounds including a lake, a pond, and a mound concealing a small shell-lined grotto topped by a Chinese-style pavilion.

Wigley was first elected member of parliament for Leicester in a by-election on 27 April 1737, and served for the next 28 years. He voted consistently against the governments of George II, Lord Egmont describing him as "much such another man as Smith," i.e. "a good natured Tory who does not love attendance." He seems to have become a supporter of the Grenville administration, and died on 21 June 1765 (aged 64).

Parliament of Great Britain
Preceded by George Wrighte; Sir George Beaumont	Member of Parliament for Leicester; 1737–1765; With: George Wrighte	Succeeded by George Wrighte; Anthony James Keck
