= Edward Abney =

English politician

Escutcheon of Sir Edward Abney

Sir Edward Abney (6 February 1631 – 3 January 1727/28) was an English civilian and politician.

== Life ==
He was born in Newton, Leicestershire, the son of James Abney of Willesley, then in Derbyshire, now in Leicestershire, who had been Sheriff of Derbyshire in 1656. His younger brother was Thomas Abney, later Sir Thomas Abney, Sheriff and Lord Mayor of London. Edward was educated at Ashby School, Measham school and Christ's College, Cambridge, where he graduated BA in 1652–3. He was a Fellow of Christ's College from 1655 to 1661.

Abney concentrated on civil law, and in 1670 became one of the six clerks in chancery, a position he held to 1682. Knighted in 1673, he served as MP for Leicester Borough from 1690 to 1698.

Blind for the last 28 years of his life, Abney died on 3 January 1728.

== Family ==
Abney married twice. His first wife, Damaris Andrewes, was the daughter of Thomas Andrewes (died 1653), a London merchant, son of Sir Thomas Andrewes (died 1659), Commonwealth Lord Mayor of London. Her mother was Damaris Cradock, daughter of Matthew Cradock (died 1641), first Governor of the Massachusetts Bay Company. At the time of their marriage in 1661 Damaris Andrewes was the stepdaughter of the philosopher Ralph Cudworth, Master of Christ's College, Cambridge, of which Abney was until that year a Fellow. With Damaris, he had a son and three daughters. His second wife was Judith, daughter and coheiress of Peter Barr, merchant, of London, with whom he had two sons. His estate was left to Thomas, the younger son of his second marriage, the elder being considered insane.

Parliament of England
Preceded by Lawrence Carter; Thomas Babington	Member of Parliament for Leicester; 1690–1698; With: Lawrence Carter 1690–1695; Archdale Palmer 1695–1698	Succeeded by Sir William Villiers; Lawrence Carter
