= Bere Alston (constituency) =

Parliamentary constituency in the United Kingdom, 1801–1832

- Former borough constituency for the House of Commons
- Borough: Bere Alston

1584–1832
- Seats: 2

Bere Alston or Beeralston was a parliamentary borough in Devon, which elected two Members of Parliament (MPs) to the House of Commons from 1584 until 1832, when the constituency was abolished by the Great Reform Act as a rotten borough.

== History ==
Bere Alston was first summoned to return MPs in 1584; like many of the boroughs over the county boundary in Cornwall that were enfranchised during the reign of Elizabeth I, it had never been of much size and was a rotten borough from the start. Indeed, its first return of members specifically states that they had been elected at the request of the Marquess of Winchester and Lord Mountjoy, the chief landowners in the borough, and its enfranchisement plainly designed to allow them to nominate MPs.

The borough consisted of most of the village of Bere Alston in the parish of Bere Ferris, 10 miles north of Plymouth. By the time of the Great Reform Act there were 112 houses within the borough boundaries, and 139 in the whole village. The population was not separately recorded in the census. It was customary for elections to be conducted under a great tree in the centre of the village; there was no equivalent of a town hall, and indeed no municipal corporation.

Bere Alston was a burgage borough, the right to vote resting with the freehold tenants of a number of specified properties within the town of which there appears to have been only 30. For much of the eighteenth century most, if not all, of these burgage properties were owned by the Drake and Hobart families (the latter becoming the Earls of Buckinghamshire in 1746). Only one contested election therefore occurred in the eighteenth century, when the two families failed to compromise. In the 1770s the borough was acquired by the 1st Duke of Northumberland, and was retained by his descendants until the borough was disenfranchised.

In the debates before the passing of the Reform Act, Bere Alston was held up as one of the most notorious examples of a rotten borough, vilified in more than one of the pro-Reform newspapers. The Times carried the following report of what happened in Bere Alston in the general election there in 1830:

"Dr Butler [the Portreeve, who was Returning Officer for the borough] ... met the voters under a great tree, the place usually chosen for the purpose of election. During the time the Portreeve was reading the acts of Parliament usually read on such occasions, one of the voters handed in to him a card containing the names of two candidates, proposed by himself and seconded by his friend. He was told ... this was too early. Before the reading was completed, the voter on the other side handed in a card corresponding with the former, which he was told was too late. The meeting broke up. The Portreeve and assistants adjourned to a public house in the neighbourhood, and then and there made a return of Lord Lovaine and Mr Blackett, which was not signed by a single person having a vote."

The election return actually bears seven signatures - individuals who were probably made temporary burgage holders to qualify as electors for the day of the election but none of whom probably resided in the borough. The two "voters" who sought to nominate candidates were probably unqualified but were actual residents. Otherwise the report is probably truthful.

The borough was disenfranchised by the Reform Act.

== Members of Parliament ==
=== 1584-1640 ===
Parliament	First member	Second member
Parliament of 1584-1585	Edward Montagu	Edward Phelips
Parliament of 1586-1587	(Sir) Charles Blount	Nicholas Martin
Parliament of 1588-1589	Richard Spencer	Ferdinand Clarke
Parliament of 1593	Sir Charles Blount	Thomas Burgoyne
Parliament of 1597-1598	Sir Jocelyn Blount	George Crooke
Parliament of 1601	Charles Lister	John Langford
Parliament of 1604-1611	Sir Arthur Atye 1604; Humphrey May from 1605	Sir Richard Strode
Addled Parliament (1614)	Thomas Crewe	Sir Richard White
Parliament of 1621-1622	Thomas Keightley	Sir Thomas Wise
Happy Parliament (1624-1625)	Thomas Jermyn	Sir Thomas Cheke
Useless Parliament (1625)	Sir Thomas Cheke	William Strode
Parliament of 1626-1627	William Strode	Thomas Wise
Parliament of 1628-1629	William Strode	Thomas Wise
No Parliament summoned 1629-1640

=== 1640-1832 ===
Year	First member	First party	Second member	Second party
April 1640	William Strode	Parliamentarian	John Harris	
November 1640	William Strode	Parliamentarian	Sir Thomas Cheek	Parliamentarian
December 1640	William Strode	Parliamentarian	Hugh Pollard	Royalist
1641	William Strode	Parliamentarian	Charles Pym	Parliamentarian
1646	Sir Francis Drake	Parliamentarian	Charles Pym	Parliamentarian
December 1648	Drake and Pym excluded in Pride's Purge - both seats vacant			
1653	Bere Alston was unrepresented in the Barebones Parliament and the First and Second Parliaments of the Protectorate			
January 1659	Sir John Maynard	Parliamentarian	Elisha Crymes	Parliamentarian
May 1659	Bere Alston was not represented in the restored Rump			
April 1660	John Maynard	Parliamentarian	George Howard	Cavalier
June 1660	John Maynard	Parliamentarian	Richard Arundell	Cavalier
1661	Sir John Maynard	Parliamentarian	George Howard	Cavalier
1662	Sir John Maynard	Parliamentarian	Richard Arundell	Cavalier
1665	Sir John Maynard	Parliamentarian	Joseph Maynard	Parliamentarian
February 1679	Sir John Maynard	Parliamentarian	Sir William Bastard	Whig
March 1679	Sir John Trevor	Tory	Sir William Bastard	Whig
1681	Sir Duncombe Colchester	Tory	John Elwill	Whig
1685	Sir John Maynard	Whig	Sir Benjamin Bathurst	Tory
19 January 1689	Sir John Maynard	Whig	John Elwill	Whig
31 January 1689	Sir John Holt	Tory	John Elwill	Whig
May 1689	Sir John Trevor	Tory	John Elwill	Whig
1690	Sir Francis Drake	Whig	John Swinfen	Whig
1691	John Smith	Whig	John Swinfen	Whig
1694	John Smith	Whig	Sir Henry Hobart	Whig
November 1695	John Elwill	Whig	Sir Henry Hobart	Whig
December 1695	John Elwill	Whig	Sir Rowland Gwynne	Whig
1698	John Hawles	Whig	Sir Rowland Gwynne	Whig
1698	John Hawles	Whig	James Montagu	Whig
January 1701	Sir Rowland Gwynne	Whig	Sir Peter King	Whig
March 1701	William Cowper	Whig	Sir Peter King	Whig
1705	Spencer Cowper	Whig	Sir Peter King	Whig
1710	Lawrence Carter	Whig	Sir Peter King	Whig
1715	Lawrence Carter	Whig	Horatio Walpole	Whig
1717	Lawrence Carter	Whig	Edward Carteret	Whig
1721	Lawrence Carter	Whig	Philip Cavendish	Whig
1721	Lawrence Carter	Whig	St John Brodrick	Whig
1722	Sir John Hobart	Whig	St John Brodrick	Whig
1724	Sir Robert Rich	Whig	St John Brodrick	Whig
1727	Sir John Hobart	Whig	Sir Francis Drake	Whig
1728	Sir Archer Croft	Whig	Lord Walden	Tory
February 1734	Sir Archer Croft	Whig	William Morden	Whig
May 1734	Sir Francis Drake	Whig	John Bristow	Whig
1740	Samuel Heathcote	Whig	John Bristow	Whig
1741	Samuel Heathcote	Whig	Sir William Morden	Whig
1747	Sir Francis Henry Drake	Whig	Sir William Morden	Whig
1754	Sir Francis Henry Drake	Whig	John Bristow	Whigs
1761	Sir Francis Henry Drake	Whig	Hon. George Hobart	Whig
1771	Francis William Drake	Whig	Hon. George Hobart	Whig
1774	Sir Francis Henry Drake	Whig	Hon. George Hobart	Whig
September 1780	Lord Algernon Percy	Tory	The Lord Macartney	Whig
December 1780	Viscount Feilding	Tory	The Lord Macartney	Whig
1781	Viscount Feilding	Tory	Laurence Cox	Tory
1784	Viscount Feilding	Tory	The Earl of Mornington	Tory
1787	Viscount Feilding	Tory	Charles Rainsford	Tory
1788	Viscount Feilding	Tory	John Mitford	Tory
1790	Sir George Beaumont	Tory	John Mitford	Tory
1796	William Mitford	Tory	John Mitford	Tory
1799	William Mitford	Tory	Lord Lovaine	Tory
1806	Hon. Josceline Percy	Tory	Lord Lovaine	Tory
1820	Henry Percy	Tory	Lord Lovaine	Tory
1825	Percy Ashburnham	Tory	Lord Lovaine	Tory
1830	Christopher Blackett	Tory	Lord Lovaine	Tory
January 1831	Christopher Blackett	Tory	David Lyon	Tory
May 1831	Lord Lovaine	Tory	David Lyon	Tory
1832	Constituency abolished			

== Election results ==
=== Elections in the 1830s ===
General election, 2 May 1831: Bere Alston
Party	Candidate	Votes	%
Tory	Algernon Percy	9	50.0
Tory	David Lyon	9	50.0
Whig	Charles Wood	0	0.0
Whig	James Mackintosh	0	0.0
Majority		9	50.0
Turnout		c. 9	c. 30.0
Registered electors		c. 30	
Tory hold			
Tory hold			

By-election, 11 January 1831: Bere Alston
Party	Candidate	Votes	%
Tory	David Lyon	7	100.0
Non Partisan	John Attwood	0	0.0
Majority		7	100.0
Turnout		c. 7	c. 23.3
Registered electors		c. 30	
Tory hold			

- Caused by Percy's succession to the peerage, becoming 5th Duke of Northumberland

General election, 31 July 1830: Bere Alston
Party	Candidate	Votes	%
Tory	George Percy	Unopposed	
Tory	Christopher Blackett	Unopposed	
Tory hold			
Tory hold			
