= Thomas Noble (MP) =

British Member of Parliament (c. 1656–1730)

Thomas Noble (c.1656 – 3 May 1730) was a British politician.

Born around 1656, Noble was the eldest son of Thomas Noble of Rearsby, an alderman of Leicester. He was elected a tory Member of Parliament for Leicester in a by-election on 3 February 1719, and served until the general election of 1722. He did not stand for parliament again.

Noble married twice, firstly to Mary Harvey before 1693, with whom he had a son and a daughter. On 13 October 1702 he married Mary Keyt, daughter of Sir William Keyt, 2nd Baronet and sister of the 3rd baronet. The second marriage was childless. Noble died on 3 May 1730.

Parliament of Great Britain
Preceded by James Winstanley; Sir George Beaumont	Member of Parliament for Leicester; 1719–1727; With: Sir George Beaumont	Succeeded by Lawrence Carter; Sir George Beaumont
