= James Whitshed (died 1789) =

Irish politician

James Whitshed (c.1716–1789) was an Irish politician who sat in the British House of Commons for 29 years from 1754 to 1783.

Whitshed was the son of James Whitshed of Dublin and his wife Grace Dillon. He entered Trinity College Dublin on 10 February 1733. He married Frances Bathurst daughter of Allen, 1st Earl Bathurst and widow of William Wodehouse MP on 5 December 1738. Later he married Frances Enery daughter of Thomas Enery of Bawnboy, county Cavan.

Whitshed was MP for Wicklow in the Irish House of Commons from 1747 to 1760. He became connected with the Leicester House faction through his father-in-law, Lord Bathurst and before the general election of 1747 and was included in a list by Dr Ayscough of "persons to be brought into Parliament by his Royal Highness, who are not able to bring in themselves". He did not stand until the 1754 general election when he was returned unopposed as Member of Parliament for St Ives on the Praed interest. In 1761 he was returned as MP for Cirencester after a contest on the Bathurst interest. He was re-elected at Cirencester in 1768, 1774 and 1780. In May 1783 he resigned to allow Lord Bathurst's son, Lord Apsley who had come of age to sit. There is no record of any speech by him during his 29 years in the House.

Whitshed had residences at Hampton Court and at New Burlingston Street, London. He died in February 1789. There is a commemorative tablet to him in the church of St James, Piccadilly on the North vestibule wall. Under the terms of his will, his cousin James Hawkins-Whitshed was to assume the name and arms of Whitshed in addition to his own, and legislation was passed in the British and Irish parliaments in 1791 to allow exemplification of his will.

Parliament of Great Britain
Preceded by John Bristow; Samuel Stephens	Member of Parliament for St Ives; 1754–1761; With: Hon. George Hobart	Succeeded by Humphrey Mackworth Praed; Colonel Charles Hotham
Preceded by Hon. Benjamin Bathurst; Hon. John Dawnay	Member of Parliament for Cirencester; 1761–1783; With: Hon. John Dawnay 1761-1768; Estcourt Cresswell 1768-1774; Samuel Blackwell 1774-1783	Succeeded by Lord Apsley; Samuel Blackwell
