= John Bristow =

English merchant, financier and politician (1701 - 1768)

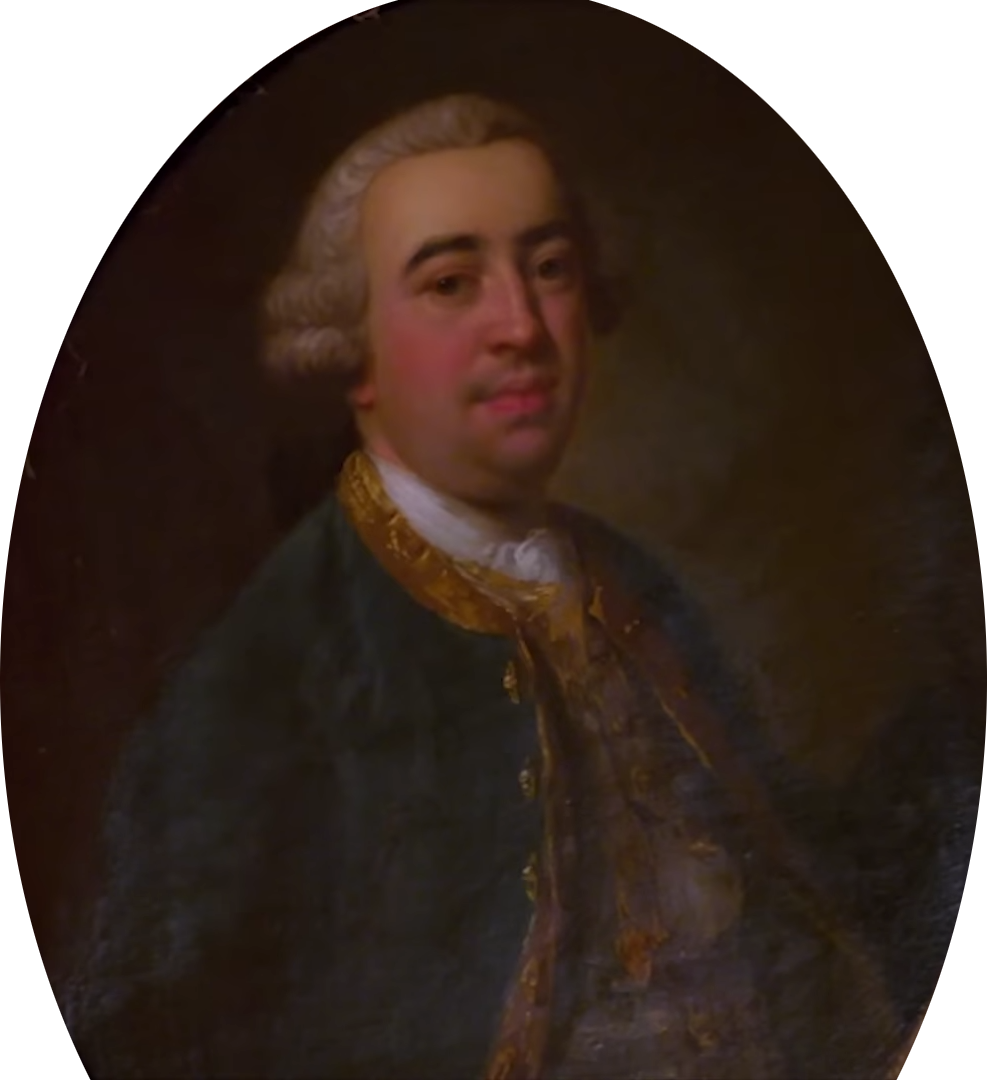
- Born: 25 April 1701
- Died: 14 November 1768 (aged 67)
- Occupation: politician

John Bristow (25 April 1701 – 14 November 1768), of Mark Lane, London, and Quidenham, Norfolk, was an English merchant, financier and politician who sat in the House of Commons from 1734 to 1768.

== Early life ==
Bristow was the third surviving son of Robert Bristow (1662–1706), MP of Micheldever, Hampshire, and his wife Katherine Woolley, daughter of Robert Woolley, vintner, of London. He became a leading merchant in trade with Portugal, and a prominent figure in the South Sea Company, of which he was a director from 1730 and then deputy governor from 1733. In 1733, he married Anne Judith Foisin, the daughter of Paul Foisin, an East India merchant in Paris.

== Career ==
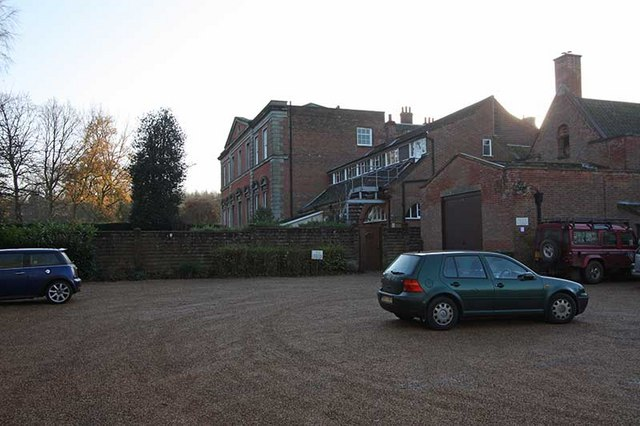
Quidenham Hall was acquired by Bristow some time after 1740

Bristow was returned by his brother-in-law, John Hobart, 1st Earl of Buckinghamshire, as Member of Parliament (MP) for Bere Alston at the 1734 British general election. He voted consistently with the Government. In 1739, on the outbreak of war with Spain, he and his partner Peter Burrell, were granted contracts for remitting money for the forces in Gibraltar, Minorca and Jamaica. The Jamaica contract was on very favourable terms and allegations arose that Walpole had made a bad bargain for the public. At the 1741 British general election he was returned as MP for St Ives. After the fall of Walpole in 1742, a secret committee was set up by the Commons to inquire into the Jamaica contract and endorsed the charges against him, but no action was taken. Bristow helped finance the continental war and, in 1744, was among the underwriters of a government loan, with a share £150,000. In 1744 he was also appointed a trustee for a loan of £200,000 to the King of Sardinia. In 1744, he was involved in raising supplies for the war. He was returned as MP for St Ives again at the 1747 British general election. In 1753 he was a financier who lent Danzig £90,000.

At the 1754 British general election, Bristow was returned as MP for Bere Alston again. He suffered great losses in the Lisbon Earthquake of 1755, which led to financial difficulties for him from then on. In November he and his partners were asked by the Treasury to procure provisions for Portugal, and in December Bristow and Burrell were appointed to provide money for the relief of those distressed in Portugal, and were to be paid £100,000 to cover costs. He became sub-governor of the South Sea Company in 1756. At the 1761 British general election, he was returned as MP for Arundel on the government interest. By this time he was owing the government considerable sums, but argued that his estate in Norfolk would provide more than enough to cover the amount, and he was owed large sums in Portugal. He went to Portugal and probably stayed there as he was absent for much of the parliament. He did not stand at the 1768 British general election.

== Death and legacy ==
Bristow died in Portugal on 14 November 1768 leaving four sons and eleven daughters. He was buried in Lisbon's British Cemetery. His daughter Caroline married William Henry Lyttleton, MP. His daughter, Frances, married Richard Neave later Governor of the Bank of England. Another daughter, Harriot Elizabeth Slessor, who married an army officer stationed in Portugal, is an ancestor of actress Olivia Colman.

Bristow had acquired Quidenham Hall after 1740 and added an East Wing in Palladian style and a West portico supported by large Doric columns.

Bristow's brother Robert Bristow (1688–1737) and his nephew Robert Bristow (1712–1776) were both MPs for Winchelsea, which had been his father's seat.

Parliament of Great Britain
Preceded by William Morden; Sir Archer Croft	Member of Parliament for Bere Alston; 1734–1741; With: Sir Francis Henry Drake to 1740; Samuel Heathcote from 1740	Succeeded by Samuel Heathcote; Sir William Morden
Preceded by William Mackworth Praed; Sir Robert Rich, Bt	Member of Parliament for St Ives; 1741–1754; With: Gregory Beake to July 1747; Lord Hobart July – December 1747; John Plumptre December 1747 – 1751; Samuel Stephens 1751–54	Succeeded by James Whitshed; Hon. George Hobart
Preceded by Sir William Morden; Sir Francis Henry Drake, 5th Bt	Member of Parliament for Bere Alston; 1754–1761; With: Sir Francis Henry Drake, 5th Bt	Succeeded by Sir Francis Henry Drake, 5th Bt; Hon. George Hobart
Preceded by Thomas Griffin; Sir George Colebrooke, Bt	Member of Parliament for Arundel; 1761–1768; With: Sir George Colebrooke, Bt	Succeeded by Sir George Colebrooke, Bt; Lauchlin Macleane
