= Lawrence Carter (judge) =

English judge and politician

Lawrence Carter (baptised 30 September 1668 – 14 March 1745) of Leicester, was an English judge and politician, a baron of the Court of Exchequer (1726–1745).

He was born in September 1671, the eldest son of Lawrence Carter and Elizabeth Wadland.

He died on 14 March 1745, aged 69, and was buried at the church of St Mary de Castro, Leicester.

Parliament of England
Preceded by Archdale Palmer; Sir Edward Abney	Member of Parliament for Leicester; 1698–1702; With: James Winstanley	Succeeded by James Winstanley; Lawrence Carter
Parliament of Great Britain
Preceded by Spencer Cowper; Sir Peter King	Member of Parliament for Bere Alston; 1710–1722; With: Sir Peter King 1710–1715; Horatio Walpole 1715–1717; Edward Carteret 1717–1721; Philip Cavendish 1721; St John Brodrick 1721	Succeeded by Sir John Hobart; St John Brodrick
Preceded by Thomas Noble; Sir George Beaumont	Member of Parliament for Leicester; 1722–1726; With: Sir George Beaumont	Succeeded by Thomas Boothby-Skrymsher; Sir George Beaumont
