= Sir William Harbord, 1st Baronet =

English landowner and politician

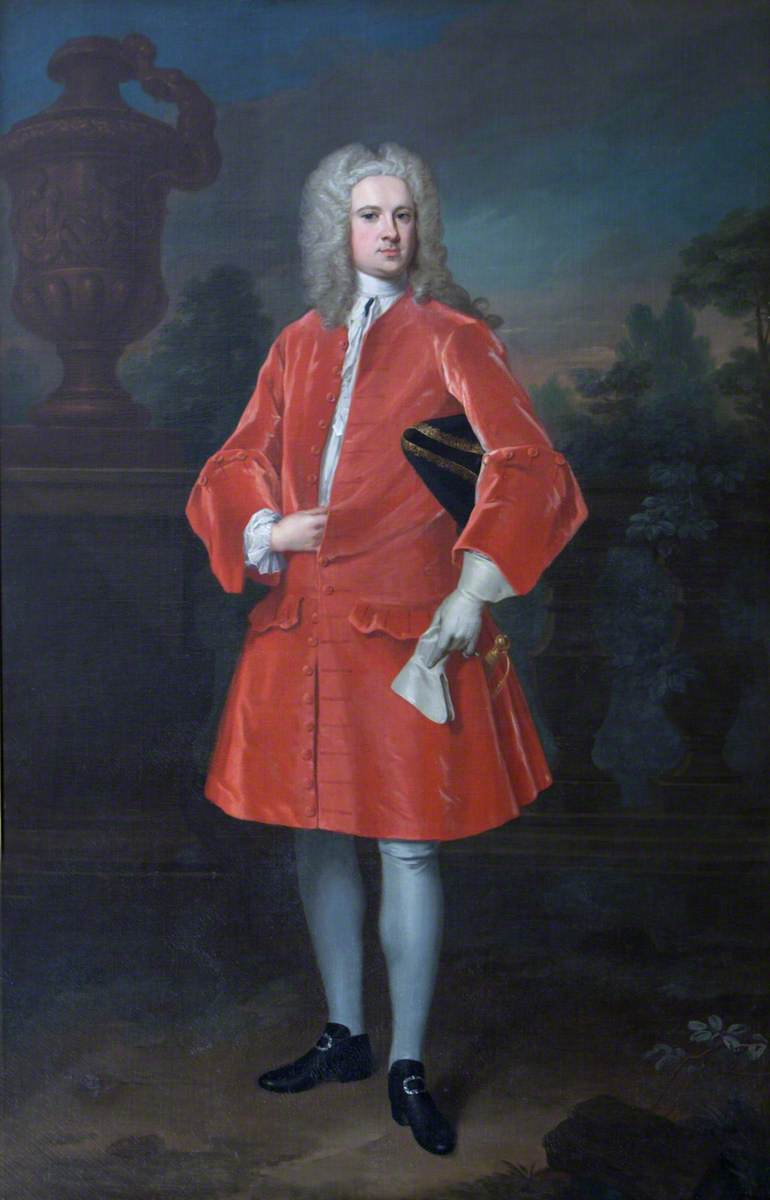
A portrait of Harbord

Sir William Harbord, 1st Baronet (c. 1696 – 17 February 1770), of Gunton and Suffield, Norfolk, was an English landowner and politician who sat in the House of Commons from between 1734 and 1754.

== Early life ==
Harbord was born William Morden, the eldest son of John Morden of Suffield and his wife Judith Cropley, daughter of William Cropley of Shelland in Suffolk. He went to school in Thurlow and Bury St Edmunds before being admitted at Caius College, Cambridge on 4 February 1713 aged 16. In 1716, he was admitted at Middle Temple. He succeeded his father to the Suffield estate in 1726. He married Elizabeth Britiffe, daughter of Robert Britiffe, Recorder of Norwich on 25 April 1732.

== Career ==
As Morden, he was returned unopposed as Member of Parliament for Bere Alston by his neighbour Sir John Hobart, 5th Baronet at a by-election on 5 February 1734. At the 1734 British general election with the heavy financial backing of Robert Walpole, he stood and lost at Norfolk. He was returned unopposed as MP for Dunwich at a by-election on 21 February 1738. At the 1741 British general election he went back to Bere Alston where he was returned unopposed.

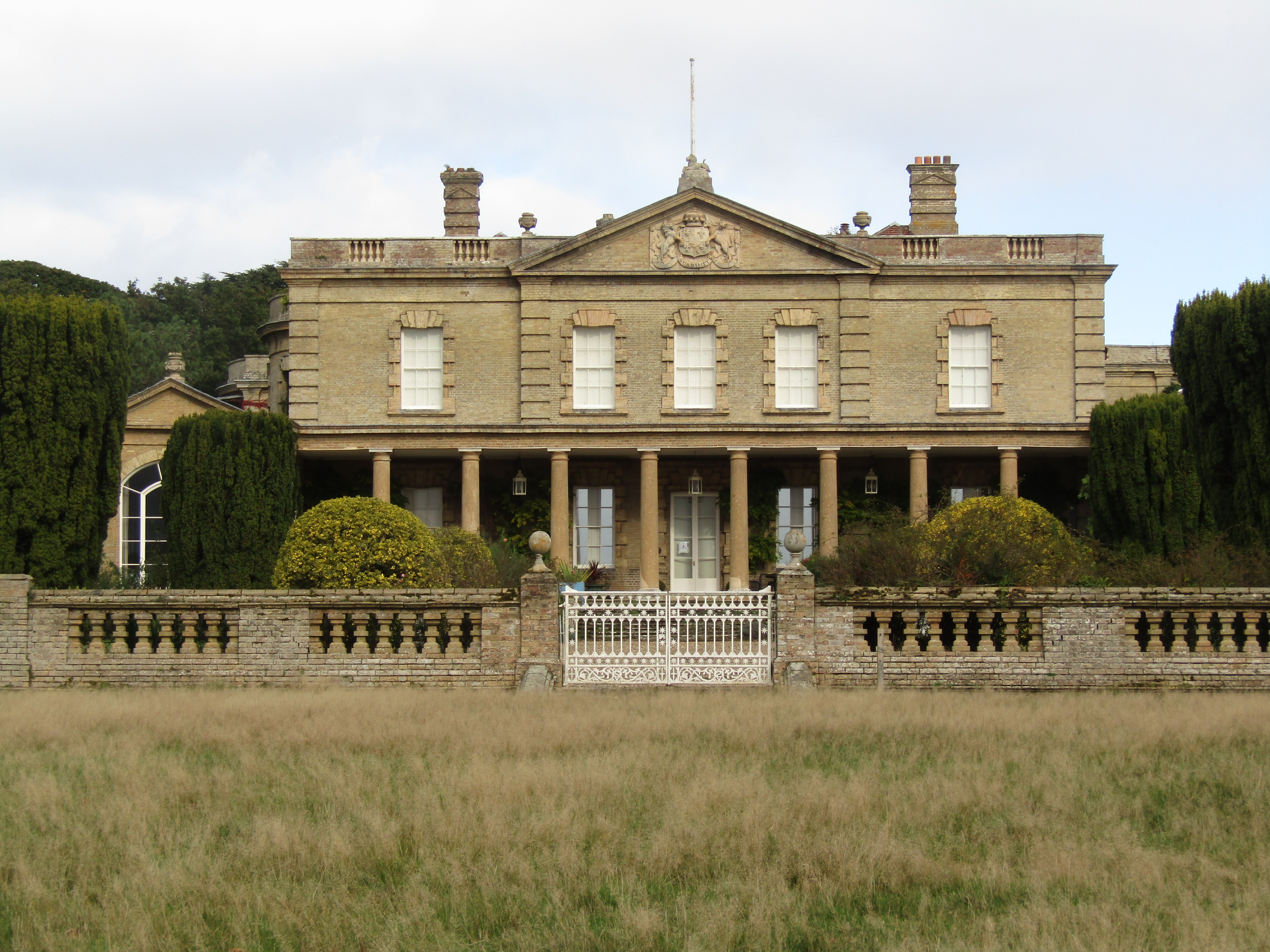
Gunton Hall including extensions by Harbord Harbord, 1st Baron Suffield

In 1742, Morden inherited the Norfolk properties of his mother's brother Harbord Harbord, and assumed the surname Harbord in place of that of Morden by royal licence to meet the will's conditions. In the 1740s he began the construction of Gunton Hall designed by the architect Matthew Brettingham. He was made a Knight Companion of the Order of the Bath on 28 May 1744 and a baronet on 22 March 1746. He was returned unopposed again at the 1747 British general election. He voted consistently for the Government. He retired at the 1754 British general election.

== Death and legacy ==
Harbord died on 17 February 1770, leaving two sons. His eldest son Harbord (1734–1810) succeeded to the baronetcy.

Parliament of Great Britain
| Preceded by Lord Hobart; Edward Bacon | Member of Parliament for Bere Alston; February–May 1734; With: Sir Archer Croft | Succeeded by Sir Francis Henry Drake; John Bristow |
| Preceded by Sir George Downing, Bt; Sir Orlando Bridgeman, Bt | Member of Parliament for Dunwich; 1738–1741; With: Sir George Downing, Bt | Succeeded by Sir George Downing, Bt; Jacob Garrard Downing |
| Preceded by Samuel Heathcote; John Bristow | Member of Parliament for Bere Alston; 1741–1754; With: Samuel Heathcote 1741–1747; Sir Francis Henry Drake 1747–1754 | Succeeded by Sir Francis Henry Drake; John Bristow |
Baronetage of Great Britain
| New creation | Baronet (of Suffield); 1746–1770 | Succeeded by Harbord Harbord |
