= Dutch West Indies campaign =

- Part of the Fourth Anglo-Dutch War
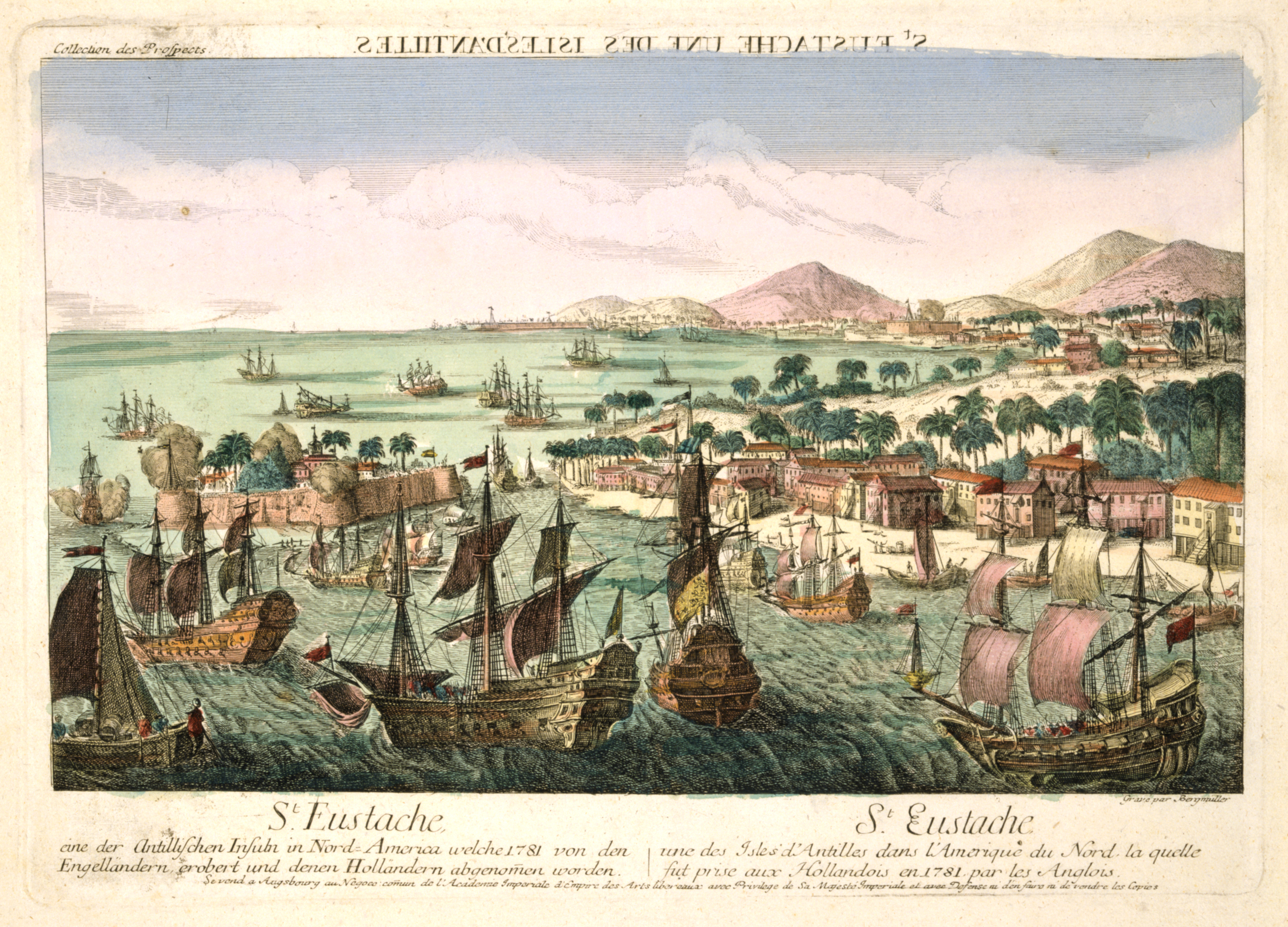
- Île de Saint Eustache en 1781, Unknown author
Date	1781–1782
Location	Sint Eustatius, Saba, Sint Maarten, Essequibo, Berbice, Demerara
Result	Status quo ante bellum

Belligerents
Great Britain	Dutch Republic; France

Commanders and leaders
George Rodney; Samuel Hood	Comte de Guichen; Comte d'Estaing; Comte de Grasse

The Dutch West Indies campaign was a series of minor conflicts in 1781 and 1782, in the Fourth Anglo-Dutch War and the American Revolutionary War. Following Great Britain's declaration of war on the Dutch Republic in December 1780, British Admiral George Brydges Rodney, the commander of the Royal Navy in the West Indies, was notified by a fast-sailing packet ship of the declaration. He immediately acted to ensure control over as many of the Dutch colonies as possible, capturing Sint Eustatius, a vital entrepot of French and Dutch trade between their colonies and Europe, in early February 1781. He also captured Saba and Sint Maarten, and orchestrated the capture of the Dutch colonial outposts of Berbice, Demerara, and Essequibo in South America. A planned expedition by Samuel Hood against Curaçao was called off on rumors that a French fleet was approaching. A French expedition in 1782 captured Demerara and Essequibo, although the fate of the other colonies were settled at the conclusion of the war.
