= Richard Arundell =

Richard Arundell may refer to:

- Richard Arundell, 1st Baron Arundell of Trerice (1616–1687), English MP
- Richard Arundell (died 1758) (c. 1696–1758), English MP, courtier and civil servant
