= John Maynard (died 1662) =

Member of the Parliament of England

John Maynard (1638 – 28 May 1662) was an English lawyer and politician who sat in the House of Commons in 1660.

Maynard was the son of John Maynard and his first wife Elizabeth Henley daughter of Andrew Henley of Taunton, Somerset and was baptised on 15 August 1638. He was admitted at Middle Temple in 1649 and was called to the bar in 1659. He was described as "of good intellectual parts" and strong enough to tear a horseshoe in half. In 1660, he was elected Member of Parliament for Bere Alston in the Convention Parliament. He does not appear to have stood in 1661 and was commissioner for assessment for Middlesex from 1661.

Maynard was unmarried and died at the age of about 24 in his chambers in the Middle Temple. He was the brother of Joseph Maynard.

Parliament of England
Preceded by Not represented in Restored Rump	Member of Parliament for Bere Alston; 1660; With: George Howard; Richard Arundell	Succeeded by George Howard; Sir John Maynard
