= John Maynard (1604–1690) =

English lawyer and politician

Sir John Maynard KS
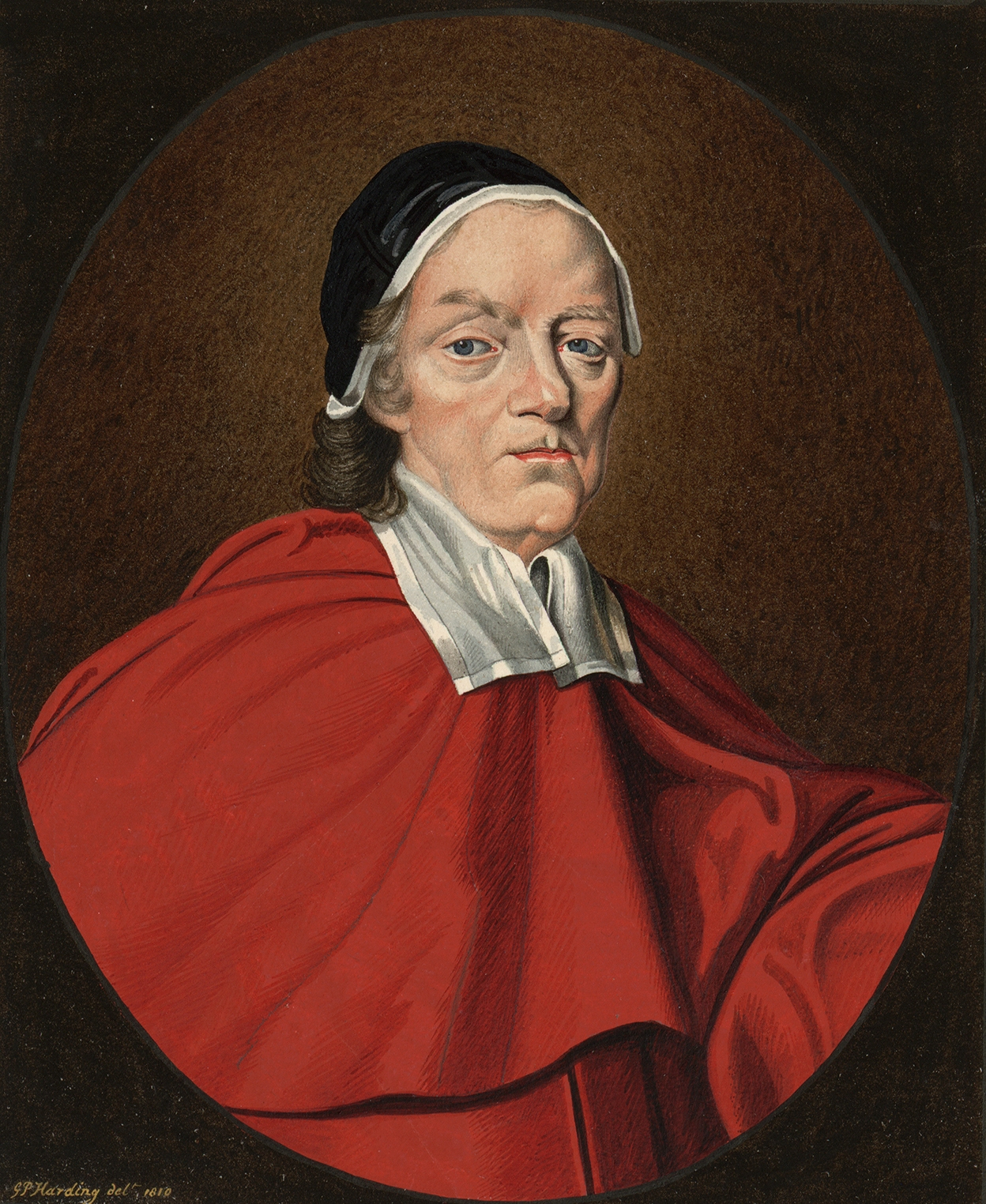
- Maynard's portrait.
- Born: 16 July 1604 prob. Tavistock
- Died: 1690 (aged 85–86); Gunnersbury Park
- Resting place: Ealing Church
- Education: Exeter College, Oxford
- Occupations: lawyer and politician
- Known for: Revising the Year Books
- Spouses: Elizabeth Henley; Jane Selhurst; Margaret Prujean born Gorges; Mary Upton
- Children: one son and four daughters
- Parent(s): Alexander and Honora Maynard

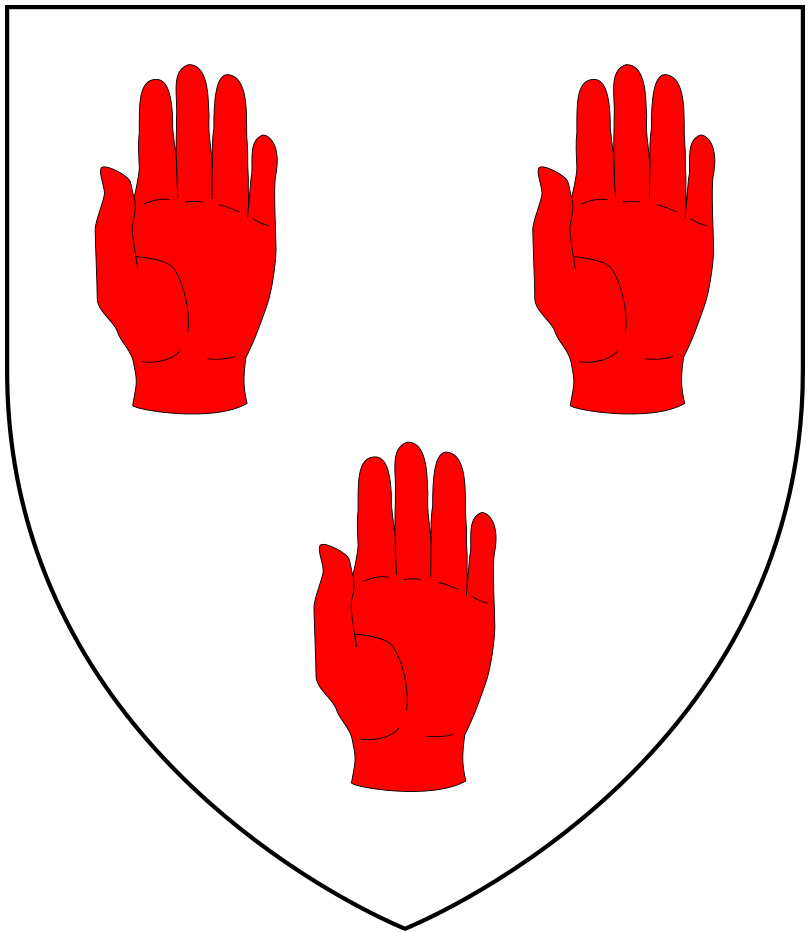
Canting arms of Maynard of Sherford: Argent, three sinister hands couped at the wrist gules

Sir John Maynard KS (1604 – 9 October 1690) was an English lawyer and politician, prominent under the reigns of Charles I, the Commonwealth, Charles II, James II and William III.

== Origins and education ==
Maynard was born in 1604 at the Abbey House, Tavistock, in Devon, the eldest son and heir of Alexander Maynard of Tavistock (4th son of John Maynard of Sherford in the parish of Brixton in Devon), a barrister of the Middle Temple, by his wife Honora Arscott, daughter of Arthur Arscott of Tetcott in Devon. The senior line of the Maynard family was seated at Sherford in the parish of Brixton in Devon. His name appears in the matriculation register of Exeter College, Oxford, under date 26 April 1621, which clashes unaccountably with the date of his admission to the degree of BA on 25 April 1621, given in the University Register of Degrees.

== Barrister ==
In 1619 he entered the Middle Temple; he was called to the Bar in November 1626, and was elected a bencher in 1648. A pupil of William Noy, afterwards Attorney General, a Devonian, and born in the law, he rapidly acquired a large practice, both on the Western circuit and at Westminster; he argued a reported case in the King's Bench in 1628 and was appointed Recorder of Plymouth in August 1640.

== Parliamentarian ==
He represented Totnes in both the Short Parliament of 1640 and the Long Parliament, and from the first took an active part in the business of the house. In December 1640 he was placed on the committee of scrutiny into the conduct of lords-lieutenant of counties, and on that for the discovery of the "prime promoters" of the new "canons ecclesiastical" passed in the recent irregular session of convocation. He was also one of the framers of the articles upon which Strafford was impeached, and one of the principal speakers at the trial. He threw himself with great zeal into the affair, and on the passing of the bill of attainder said joyfully to Sir John Bramston, "Now we have done our work. If we could not have effected this we could have done nothing". A strong Presbyterian, he subscribed and administered to the house the protestation of 3 May 1641 in defence of the Protestant religion, and drafted the bill making subscription thereto obligatory on all subjects.

In the committee, which sat at Guildhall after the adjournment of the House of Commons which followed the king's attempt to arrest the five members (4 January 1641/2), he made an eloquent speech in defence of parliamentary privilege. In the following May he accepted a deputy-lieutenancy of militia under the parliament, and on 12 June 1643 was nominated a member of the Westminster Assembly of Divines. He took the covenant on 25 September following, and was one of the managers of the impeachment of William Laud in January–March 1643/4. With his friend Bulstrode Whitelocke, Maynard attended, by Essex's invitation, a meeting of the anti-Cromwellian faction, held at Essex House in December 1644, to discuss the expediency of taking public action against Cromwell as an 'incendiary.' The idea, which seems to have originated with the Lord Chancellor of Scotland Loudon, met with no favour from the English lawyers, and was in consequence abandoned.

A curious testimony to Maynard's reputation at this time is afforded by a grant made in his favour by parliament in October 1645 of the books and manuscripts of the late Lord Chief Justice Bankes, with liberty to seize them wherever he might find them. In the House of Commons he was heard with the profoundest respect, while he advocated the abolition of feudal wardships and other salutary legal reforms. He also prospered mightily in his profession, making in the course of the summer circuit of 1647 the unprecedentedly large sum of £700. As a politician he was a strict constitutionalist, protested against the first steps taken towards the deposition of the king, and on the adoption of that policy withdrew from the house as no longer a lawful assembly (November 1648).

== State trials under the Commonwealth ==
Nevertheless, on the establishment of the Commonwealth he did not scruple to take the engagement, and held a government brief at the trial of Major Faulconer for perjury in May 1653. Assigned by order of court to advise John Lilburne on his second trial in July 1653, Maynard at first feigned sickness. A repetition of the order, however, elicited from him some exceptions to the indictment which confounded the court and secured Lilburne's acquittal by the jury. The jury were afterwards interrogated by the council of state as to the grounds of their verdict, but refused to disclose them, and Maynard thus escaped censure, and on 9 February 1653/4 was called to the degree of serjeant-at-law.

In the following year his professional duty brought him into temporary collision with the government. One Cony, a city merchant, had been arrested by order of the council of state for non-payment of taxes, and Maynard, with Serjeants Thomas Twysden and Wadham Wyndham, moved on his behalf in the upper bench for a habeas corpus. Their argument on the return, 18 May 1655, amounted in effect to a direct attack on the government as a usurpation, and all three were forthwith, by order of Cromwell, committed to the Tower of London; they were released on making submission (25 May).

== Continuing political preferment ==
Maynard was among the commissioners appointed to collect the quota of the Spanish war tax of 1657 payable by Devon. Thomas Carlyle is in error in stating that he was a member of Cromwell's House of Lords. He sat in the House of Commons for Plymouth during the Second Protectorate Parliament, and on the debates on the designation to be given to the 'other' house argued strongly for the revival of the old name (4 February 1657/8). Burnet states, and it is extremely probable, that he was also in favour of the revival of monarchy. On 1 May 1658 he was appointed Protector's serjeant, in which capacity he followed the Protector's bier on the ensuing 23 November. On the accession of Richard Cromwell he was made solicitor-general, and in parliament, where he sat for Newtown, Isle of Wight, lent the whole weight of his authority as a constitutional lawyer to prop up the Protector's tottering government.

== Education ==
In 1658, Maynard was involved in the founding of two schools in Exeter, The Maynard School for girls and Hele's School for boys. He was also involved with the Grammar school at Totnes which, like The Maynard, was endowed with funds under the will of Elizeeus Hele, who left considerable property for charitable purposes (Maynard was one of the trustees of his will). The will was the subject of a court case held before Sir Edward Rhodes. In this case the Captain Edmond Lister petitioned parliament on behalf of his wife Joanne. The basis of the petition was that all the money had been left to charity although at the time the will was written Joanne was not born. Rhodes found that any monies left over from the charitable purposes should be given to Joanne Lister although the charitable purposes should continue.

== The Restoration ==
On Richard's abdication and the resuscitation of the Rump Parliament, Maynard took no part in parliamentary business until 21 February 1659/60, when he was placed on the committee for drafting the bill to constitute the new council of state. He reported the bill the same day, and was himself voted a member of the council on the 23rd. He sat for Bere Alston, Devon, in the Convention Parliament, was one of the first Serjeants called at the Restoration (22 June 1660), and soon afterwards (9 November) was advanced to the rank of king's serjeant and knighted (16 November). With his brother-serjeant, Sir John Glynne, he rode in the coronation procession, on 23 April 1661, behind the attorney and solicitor-general, much to the disgust of Samuel Pepys, who regarded him as a turncoat.

== The reign of Charles II ==
As king's serjeant, Maynard appeared for the crown at some of the state trials with which the new reign was inaugurated, among others that of Sir Henry Vane in Trinity term 1662. He represented Bere Alston in the Pensionary Parliament, 1661–1679, and sat for Plymouth during the rest of Charles II's reign. He was the principal manager of the abortive impeachment of Lord Mordaunt in 1666–67, and constituted himself counsel for the defence in the proceedings against Lord Clarendon in the following October. He appeared for the House of Lords in the king's bench on the return to Lord Shaftesbury's habeas corpus on 29 June 1677, and sustained its sufficiency on the ground that, though a general warrant for commitment to prison would be invalid if issued by any court but the House of Lords, the king's bench had no jurisdiction to declare it so when issued by that house. In 1678 he made a spirited but ineffectual attempt to secure the conviction of Lord Cornwallis for the brutal murder of a boy in St. James's Park. The severe censure which Lord Campbell passed upon him for his conduct of this case is based upon an entire misapprehension of the facts.

In the debate on Lord Danby's impeachment (December 1678) Maynard showed a regrettable disposition to strain the Treason Act 1351 (25 Edward III) to his disadvantage, maintaining that its scope might be enlarged by retrospective legislation, which caused Swift to denounce him, in a note to Burnet's Own Time, as 'a knave or a fool for all his law.' On constitutional questions he steered as a rule a wary and somewhat ambiguous course, professing equal solicitude for the royal prerogative and the power and privileges of parliament, acknowledging the existence of a dispensing power, without either defining its limits or admitting that it had none (10 February 1672/3), at one time resisting the king's attempts to adjourn parliament by message from the Speaker's chair (February 1677/8), and at another counselling acquiescence in his arbitrary rejection of a duly elected speaker (10–11 March 1678/1679).

Maynard opened the case against Edward Colman on 27 November 1678, and took part in most of the prosecutions arising out of the supposed Popish Plot, including the impeachment of Lord Stafford, in December 1680. Lord Campbell's interesting story of his slipping away to circuit without leave during the debate on the Exclusion Bill in the preceding November, 'upon which his son was instructed to inform him that if he did not return forthwith he should be sent for in custody, he being treated thus tenderly in respect of his having been long the Father of the House' is a sheer fabrication.

Maynard favoured the impeachment of Edward Fitzharris, declared its rejection by the House of Lords a breach of privilege (26 March 1681), and took part in the subsequent prosecution in the king's bench. In the action for false imprisonment during his mayoralty brought by Sir William Pritchard against the ex-sheriff Thomas Papillon on 6 November 1684, an incident in the conflict after the court took on the liberties of the City of London, Maynard conducted the defence with eminent skill and zeal, though a Jeffreys-ridden jury found a verdict for the plaintiff with £10,000 damages. Summoned to give evidence on behalf of Oates on his trial for perjury in May 1685, and questioned concerning the impeachment of Lord Stafford, Maynard pleaded total inability to swear to his memory in regard to that matter, and was dismissed by Jeffreys with a sneer at his supposed failing powers.

== The reign of James II ==
During the reign of James II Maynard represented Bere Alston in parliament. He opposed so much of the abortive bill for the preservation of the king's person as proposed to make it high treason to assert by word of mouth the legitimacy of the Duke of Monmouth (June), and likewise the extraordinary supply for the creation of a standing army demanded by the king after the suppression of the western rebellion. Though not, it would seem, a privy councillor, he was summoned to the council held to establish the birth of the Prince of Wales on 22 October 1688, and also to the meeting of the lords spiritual and temporal held on 22 December, to confer on the emergency presented by the flight of the king, and as doyen of the bar was presented to the Prince of Orange on his arrival in London. William congratulated him on having outlived so many rivals; Maynard replied : 'And I had like to have outlived the law itself had not your highness come over.'

== The reign of William III ==
We are at the moment out of the beaten path. If therefore we are determined to move only in that path, we cannot move at all. A man in a revolution resolving to do nothing which is not strictly according to established form resembles a man who has lost himself in the wilderness, and who stands crying "Where is the king's highway? I will walk nowhere but on the king's highway." In a wilderness a man should take the track which will carry him home. In a revolution we must have recourse to the highest law, the safety of the state. Maynard

In the convention which met on 22 January 1688/9, Maynard sat for Plymouth, and in the debate of the 28th on the state of the nation, and the conference with the lords which followed on 2 February, argued that James had vacated the throne by his Roman Catholicism, and attempted subversion of the constitution, and that as during his life he could have no heir, the choice lay between an alteration of the succession and a regency of indefinite duration. He supported the bill for declaring the convention a parliament on the very frank ground that a dissolution, owing to the ferment among the clergy, would mean the triumph of the tory party. On 5 March he was sworn lord commissioner of the great seal, jointly with Sir Anthony Keck and Sir William Rawlinson. This office did not exclude him from the House of Commons, and he continued to take an active part in its proceedings. On 16 March he moved for leave to introduce a bill for disarming papists; and while professing perfect confidence in the queen, he energetically opposed the bill for vesting the regency in her during William's absence from the realm, the passing of which into law was closely followed by his retirement or removal from office, his last appearance in court being on 14 May 1690.

== Reputation ==
So brief a tenure of office at so advanced an age afforded Maynard little or no opportunity for the display of high judicial powers. As to his merits, however, all parties were agreed; the bench, as Thomas Fuller quaintly wrote before the Restoration, seeming "sick with long longing for his sitting thereon". Roger North admits that he was "the best old book lawyer of his time". Clarendon speaks of his "eminent parts", "great learning", and "signal reputation". Anthony Wood praises his "great reading and knowledge in the more profound and perplexed parts of the law", and his devotion to "his mother the university of Oxon". As a politician, his moderation and consistency were generally recognised, though for his part in the impeachments of Strafford and Stafford he was savagely attacked by Roscommon in his Ghost of the late House of Commons (1680–1). Though hardly eloquent, Maynard was a singularly facile and fluent speaker (Roscommon sneers at "his accumulative hackney tongue" and could sometimes be crushing in retort. Jeffreys once taxing him in open court with having forgotten his law, he is said to have replied: "In that case I must have forgotten a great deal more than your lordship ever knew." He humorously defined advocacy as ars bablativa.

To Maynard we owe the unique edition of the reports of Richard de Winchedon, being the Year Books of Edward II, covering substantially the entire reign to Trinity term 1326, together with excerpts from the records of Edward I, London (1678–9).

== Gunnersbury Park ==
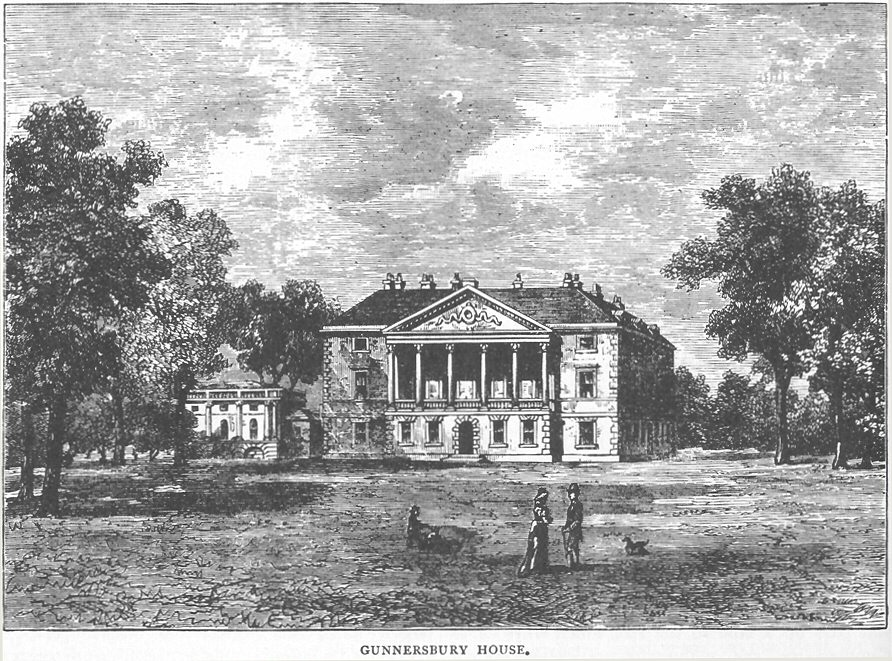
Gunnersbury House, around 1750

Maynard amassed a large fortune, bought the manor of Gunnersbury, and there in 1663 built from designs by Inigo Jones or his pupil Webb a palace, Gunnersbury House, (afterwards the residence of the Princess Amelia, daughter of George II). He died there on 9 October 1690, his body lying in state until the 25th, when it was interred with great pomp in Ealing Church.

== Family and posterity ==
Maynard married, firstly, Elizabeth Henley, daughter of Andrew Henley of Taunton, Somerset who had three sons and four daughters. She was buried in Ealing Church on 4 January 1655. He married secondly, Jane Austen, widow of Edward Austen and daughter of Cheney Selhurst of Tenterden. She was buried in Ealing Church in 1668. His third wife was Margaret, widow successively of Sir Thomas Fleming of North Stoneham, Hampshire and Sir Francis Prujean, physician to the king, and daughter of Edward, Lord Gorges. He married fourthly, Mary Vermuyden, widow of Sir Charles Vermuyden, M.D. and daughter of Ambrose Upton, canon of Christ Church Cathedral, Oxford. Mary survived Maynard and remarried to Henry Howard, 5th Earl of Suffolk.

Maynard's Estate Act 1694
- Act of Parliament
- Parliament of England
- Long title: An Act for settling the Estate of Sir John Maynard Knight, deceased, late One of the Lords Commissioners for the Custody of the Great Seal of England.
- Citation: 5 & 6 Will. & Mar. c. 16 Pr.
- Territorial extent: England and Wales

Dates
- Royal assent: 16 April 1694
- Commencement: 7 November 1693 (Note: Start of session.)

Status: Current legislation

By his first wife Maynard had sons John, Joseph, and four daughters, Elizabeth, Honora, Johanna, and Martha. His eldest daughter married Sir Duncumbe Colchester of Westbury, Gloucestershire; the second, Edward Nosworthy of Devon; the third, Thomas Legh of Adlington Hall, Cheshire; and the fourth, Sir Edward Gresham, Bt. Maynard survived all his children, except his youngest daughter, and devised his estates in trust for his granddaughters and their issue in tail by a will so obscure that to settle the disputes to which it gave rise a private act of Parliament, Maynard's Estate Act 1694 (5 & 6 Will. & Mar. c. 16 Pr.), notwithstanding which it was made the subject of litigation in 1709.

Portraits are in the National Portrait Gallery and at Exeter College, Oxford.

One of Maynard's opinions was printed in London's Liberty. For his speeches at Strafford's trial see John Rushworth's Historical Collections. For other of his speeches see William Cobbett's State Trials, Parliamentary History, and Somers Tracts.

He must be carefully distinguished from his namesake, Sir John Maynard, K.B. (1592–1658), with whom he has been confounded by Lord Campbell.

== Sources ==
- History of Parliament Online – John Maynard
- Bramston, Sir John. (Baron Richard Griffin Braybrooke editor), The autobiography of Sir John Bramston: K.B., of Skreens, in the hundred of Chelmsford; now first printed from the original ms. in the possession of his lineal descendant Thomas William Bramston, Esq., Camden society. Publications, no. xxxii, Printed for the Camden society, by J. B. Nichols and son, 1845
- Lewis, Samuel (1831). A Topographical Dictionary of England Comprising the Several Counties, Cities, Boroughs, Corporate & Market Towns ...& the Islands of Guernsey, Jersey, and Man, with Historical and Statistical Descriptions; Illustrated by Maps of the Different Counties & Islands; ... and a Plan of London and Its Environs]
- Rigg, James McMullen "Maynard, John (1602-1690)" . Dictionary of National Biography. London: Smith, Elder & Co. 1885–1900.

Attribution

This article incorporates text from a publication now in the public domain: "Maynard, John (1602-1690)". Dictionary of National Biography. London: Smith, Elder & Co. 1885–1900.

Parliament of England
Vacant Parliament suspended since 1629	Member of Parliament for Totnes; 1640–1653; With: Oliver St John	Not represented in Barebones Parliament
Preceded by Christopher Silly; William Yeo	Member of Parliament for Plymouth; 1656–1658; With: Timothy Alsop	Succeeded by Christopher Silly; Timothy Alsop
Vacant Not represented in Second Protectorate Parliament	Member of Parliament for Newtown; 1659; With: William Laurence	Not represented in Restored Rump
Vacant Not represented in Second Protectorate Parliament	Member of Parliament for Bere Alston; 1659; With: Elisha Crymes	Not represented in Restored Rump
Vacant Not represented in Second Protectorate Parliament	Member of Parliament for Camelford; 1659; With: William Bradden	Succeeded by William Say
Preceded by Thomas Bampfield; Sir Thomas Gibbon	Member of Parliament for Exeter; 1660–1661; With: Thomas Bampfield	Succeeded by Robert Walker; Sir James Smyth
Preceded by John Maynard; Richard Arundell	Member of Parliament for Bere Alston; 1661–1679; With: George Howard 1661–1662; Richard Arundell 1662–1665; Joseph Maynard 1665–1679; Sir William Bastard 1679	Succeeded by Sir William Bastard; Sir John Trevor
Preceded by Sir Gilbert Talbot; John Sparke	Member of Parliament for Plymouth; 1679–1685; With: John Sparke 1679–1680; Sir William Jones 1680–1685	Succeeded by Bernard Granville; The Earl of Ranelagh
Preceded by Sir Duncombe Colchester; John Elwill	Member of Parliament for Bere Alston; 1685–1689; With: Sir Benjamin Bathurst 1685–1689; John Elwill 1689	Succeeded by John Elwill; Sir John Holt
Preceded by Bernard Granville; The Earl of Ranelagh	Member of Parliament for Plymouth; 1689–1690; With: Arthur Herbert 1689; Sir William Jones 1689–1690	Succeeded by John Granville; John Trelawny
