= John Sparke (died 1680) =

English landowner and politician

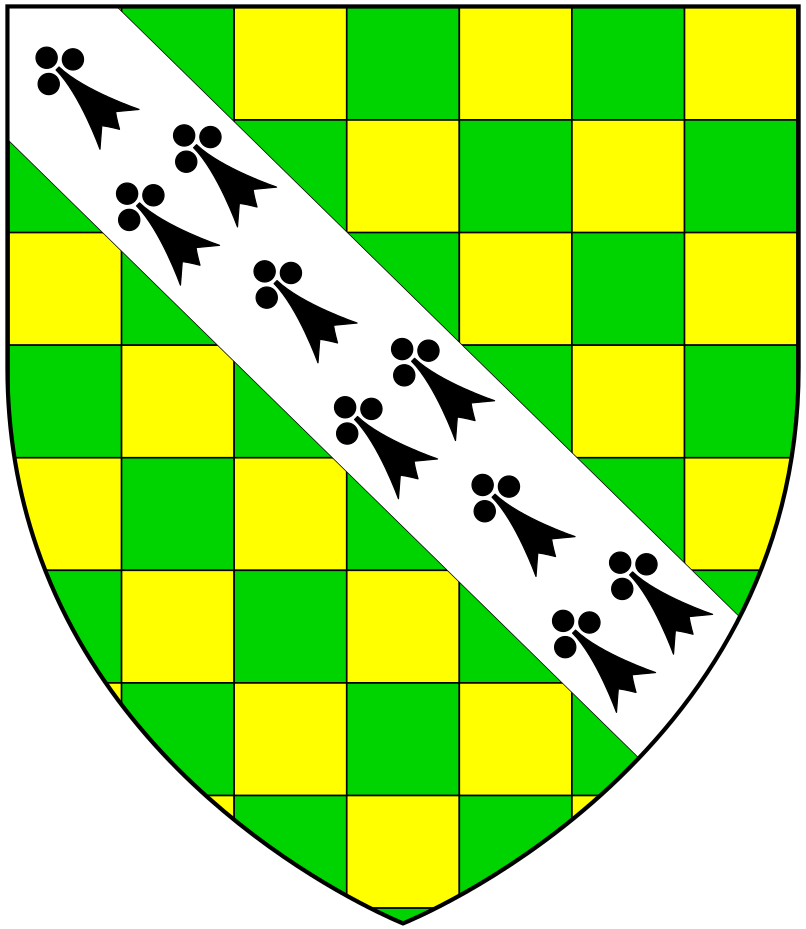
Arms of Sparke: Chequy or and vert, a bend ermine

John Sparke (1636 – 8 October 1680) of the Friary, in the parish of St Jude, Plymouth, Devon, was an English landowner and politician who sat in the House of Commons from 1677 to 1680.

== Origins ==
Sparke was the son of Jonathan Sparke of Plymouth (second son of John Sparke (c 1574–1640), MP, of The Friary, in the parish of St Jude, Plymouth) by his wife Mary Basset, daughter of Sir Robert Basset of Heanton Punchardon. Jonathan Sparke is mentioned in the Travel Journal of Cosimo III de' Medici, Grand Duke of Tuscany (1642-1723) who was visiting Plymouth on 5 April 1669:

"On the 5th of the same month Sir Jonathan Spark came to pay his respects to the serene prince, accompanied by his son. This gentleman is an inhabitant of Plymouth, in the neighbourhood of which he possesses an estate of a thousand pounds a year; consequently he is considered the principal person of the place".

== Residence ==
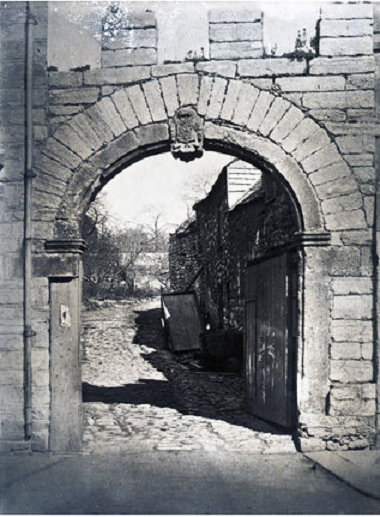
Friary Gate (alias Sparke's Gate), Exeter Street, Plymouth. Photograph c.1890 showing "Sparke's Gate", an early 18th century rebuild of the dilapidated 13th century entrance to the Whitefriars Abbey, which had been acquired as their residence by the Sparke family after the Dissolution of the Monasteries

The Sparke family's residence in Plymouth was the former Whitefriars Abbey, in the parish of St Jude, which after the Dissolution of the Monasteries was probably acquired by Giles and Gregory Iselham, who obtained possession of other ecclesiastical property in Plymouth. It was then acquired by the Sparke family, who made it their residence. From Sparke it passed to the Molesworths and Clarkes to the Beweses. The buildings were converted into a hospital for soldiers in the year 1794, when a deadly sickness was ravaging the troops detained at the port for the West India expedition. They were subsequently used as an infirmary for the troops stationed at Millbay and Frankfort Barracks. Parts were used as dwellings, but Friary Court was thenceforth never considered a fashionable address. By 1890 all had disappeared and the bulk of the site was occupied by the Friary Railway Station, now closed, of the London and South Western Railway, with another part occupied by the Roman Catholic Church of the Holy Cross.

== Life ==
He was baptised on 27 August 1636. He was a student at Inner Temple in 1656. He succeeded his father in 1673 and inherited extensive property in Plymouth, including the former Whitefriars Priory. In 1677 he was elected Member of Parliament for Plymouth in a by-election to the Cavalier Parliament. He was commissioner for assessment for Plymouth from 1677 to 1679 and for Devon from 1677 until his death. In 1678 he became Justice of the Peace for Devon. He was re-elected MP for Plymouth in the two elections of 1679 to the First and Second Exclusion Parliaments but died before the latter met.

== Marriage ==
By licence dated 29 October 1663, Sparke married Mary Carew, a daughter of Sir Alexander Carew, 2nd Baronet of Antony (near Plymouth) in Cornwall by whom he had at least two sons.

== Death ==
Sparke died at the age of about 44.

== Sources ==
- Crossette, J.S., biography of Sparke, John (1636-80), of the Friary, Plymouth, Devon, published in History of Parliament: House of Commons 1660–1690, ed. B.D. Henning, 1983

Parliament of England
Preceded by Sir William Morice; Sir Gilbert Talbot	Member of Parliament for Plymouth; 1677–1680; With: Sir Gilbert Talbot 1677–1679; Sir John Maynard 1679–1680	Succeeded by Sir John Maynard; Sir William Jones
