= Algernon Sidney =

English politician (1623–1683)

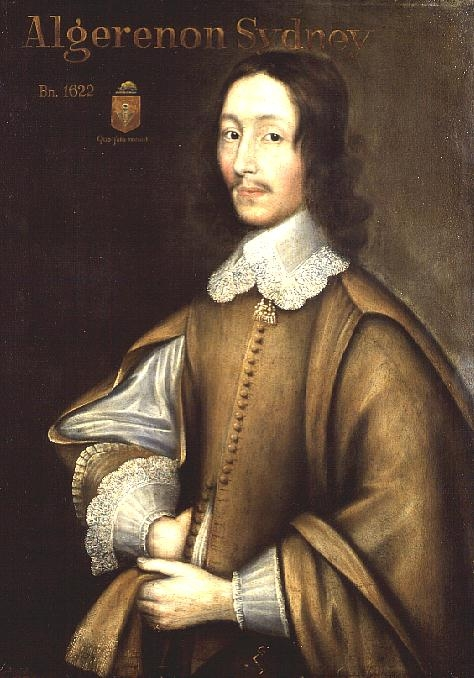
- Sidney in 1647
- Born: 15 January 1623; Baynard's Castle, London, England
- Died: 7 December 1683 (aged 60); Tower Hill, London, England

Philosophical work
- Era: 17th-century philosophy
- Region: Western philosophy
- School: Republicanism
- Main interests: Political philosophy
- Notable ideas: The right of the people to alter or abolish corrupt government

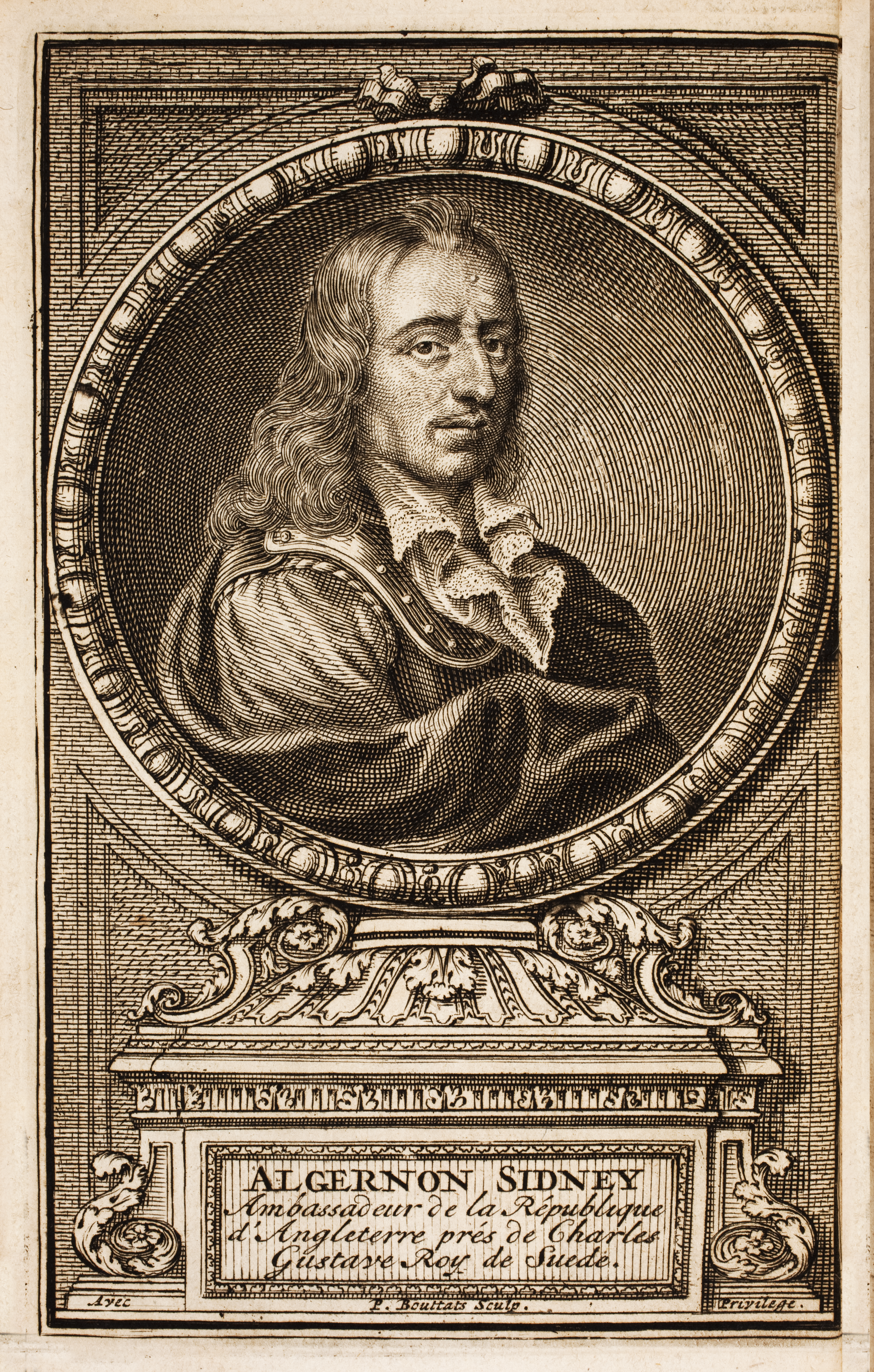
Portrait of Sidney on the frontispiece of the French translation Discours sur le gouvernement (Discourses Concerning Government), The Hague, 1702

Algernon Sidney or Sydney (15 January 1623 – 7 December 1683) was an English military officer, politician, and republican political theorist. A member of the middle part of the Long Parliament and commissioner of the trial of King Charles I of England, he opposed the king's execution. Sidney was later charged with plotting against Charles II, in part based on his most famous work, Discourses Concerning Government, which was used by the prosecution as a witness at his trial. He was executed for treason. After his death, Sidney was revered as a "Whig patriot—hero and martyr".

The works of Algernon Sidney, along with those of contemporary John Locke, are considered as cornerstones of western thought. James Madison and Thomas Jefferson stated that Locke's Second Treatise on Government and Sidney's Discourses Concerning Government contained the "general principles of liberty and rights of man in nature and society". While Discourses Concerning Government cost Sidney his life, the ideas which it put forth survived and ultimately culminated in the Glorious Revolution in England and the founding of the United States. Sidney directly opposed the theory of divine right of kings by suggesting ideas such as limited government, voluntary consent of the people and the right of citizens to alter or abolish a corrupt government. Discourses Concerning Government has been called "the textbook of the American revolution."

== Early life and education ==
Sidney's father was Robert Sidney, 2nd Earl of Leicester, a direct descendant of John Dudley, 1st Duke of Northumberland and the great-nephew of Sir Philip Sidney. His mother was Dorothy Percy, daughter of Henry Percy, 9th Earl of Northumberland. Sidney was born at Baynard's Castle, London, and was raised at Penshurst Place in Kent. His mother wrote to her husband in November 1636 that she had heard their son "much commended by all that comes from you ... [for] a huge deal of wit and much sweetness of nature".

== English Civil War and Republic ==
Despite having earlier vowed that only "extreme necessity shall make me think of bearing arms in England", Sidney served in the Army of the Eastern Association, becoming lieutenant colonel of the Earl of Manchester's regiment of horse (cavalry). He fought at the Battle of Marston Moor in 1644, where an observer wrote: "Colonel Sidney charged with much gallantry in the head of my Lord Manchester's regiment of horses, and came off with many wounds, the true badges of his honor". He was later appointed colonel of the regiment when it was transferred to the New Model Army, but relinquished the appointment due to ill health.

In 1645 Sidney was elected to the Long Parliament as Member of Parliament for Cardiff where he opposed compromising with the King, Charles I. In 1648 he opposed the purge of moderates who had formed the Rump Parliament. Despite being a commissioner for the trial of Charles, Sidney opposed the decision to execute the king, believing it to be of questionable lawfulness and wisdom. He said in explaining his view:

First, the King could be tried by no court; secondly, that no man could be tried by that court. This being alleged in vain, and Cromwell using these formal words (I tell you, wee will cut off his head with the crown upon it) I ... immediately went out of the room, and never returned.

By 1649 Sidney had changed his opinion, declaring the king's execution as "the justest and bravest act ... that ever was done in England, or anywhere".

In 1653 when Cromwell's army entered Parliament to dissolve it after a Bill was introduced that would have made elections freer, Sidney refused to leave the House until threatened with physical removal. He regarded Cromwell as a tyrant.

In retirement, Sidney was bold enough to outrage the Lord Protector by allegedly putting on a performance of Julius Caesar, and playing the role of Brutus. He was for a time the lover of Lucy Walter, later the mistress of Charles II. Sidney regarded the Republic as vigorously pursuing England's national interests (in contrast to the Stuarts' record of military failure), writing in his Discourses Concerning Government:

... such was the power and wisdom and integrity in those that sat at the helm, and their diligence in causing men only for their merit was blessed with such success, that in two years our fleets grew to be as famous as our land armies; the reputation and power of our nation rose to a greater height, than when we possessed the better half of France, and the kings of France and Scotland were our prisoners. All the states, kings and potentates of Europe, most respectfully, not to say submissively, sought our friendship; and Rome was more afraid of Blake and his fleet, than they had been of the great king of Sweden, when he was ready to invade Italy with a hundred thousand men.

== Baltic ambassador ==
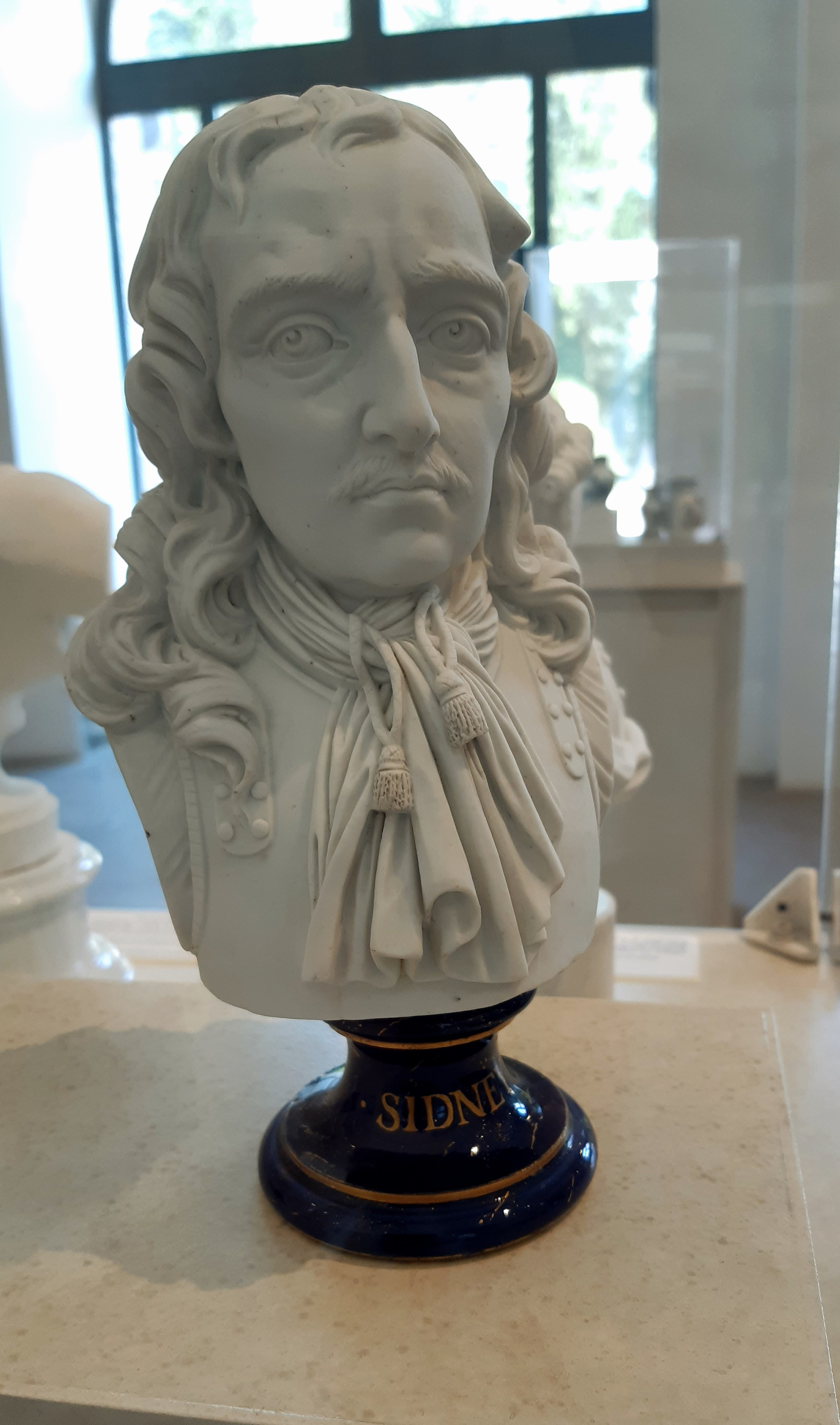
Bust of Algernon Sidney made around 1793, Musée de la Révolution française

After Cromwell's death in 1658, the army abolished the Protectorate in 1659 and reconvened the Rump Parliament, with Sidney taking up his seat in the Commons. During 1659 and 1660 he was part of a delegation to help arbitrate peace between Denmark and Sweden, as war would threaten England's naval supplies, as well as those of the Dutch. The delegation was commanded by Edward Montagu, with Sidney and Sir Robert Honywood. The third planned plenipotentiary, Bulstrode Whitelocke, declined because: "I knew well the overruling temper and height of Colonel Sydney".

Sidney discarded conventional diplomatic norms ("a few shots of our cannon would have made this peace") to impose a peace favourable to England. Due to the Swedish king Charles X Gustav being unable to immediately receive them, the delegation negotiated with the Dutch on forming a joint fleet to impose peace terms. Charles X complained that the English "wish to command all, as if they were masters". Sidney in person handed Charles the treaty proposal (already accepted by Denmark), threatening military action. He recorded that Charles "in great choler ... told us, that we made projects upon our fleets, and he, laying his hand upon his sword, had a project by his side". Sidney would not back down and an observer wrote: "Everyone is amazed how Sidney stood up to him". But, Montagu planned to go back to England with the fleet, leading Sidney to give "his opinion, [that] for sending away the whole fleet he thought he should deserve to lose his head".

Despite this curtailment of England's influence, Denmark, Sweden, France, England and Holland signed a treaty on 27 May 1660. It was during this period that Sidney signed the visitor's book at the University of Copenhagen with: "PHILIPPUS SIDNEY MANUS HAEC INIMICA TYRANNIS ENSE PETIT PLACIDAM CUM LIBERTATE QUIETEM" ("This hand, enemy to tyrants, by the sword seeks peace with liberty"). This expression was incorporated into the Great Seal of Massachusetts in 1780 by an act of legislature during the American Revolutionary War.

== Exile ==
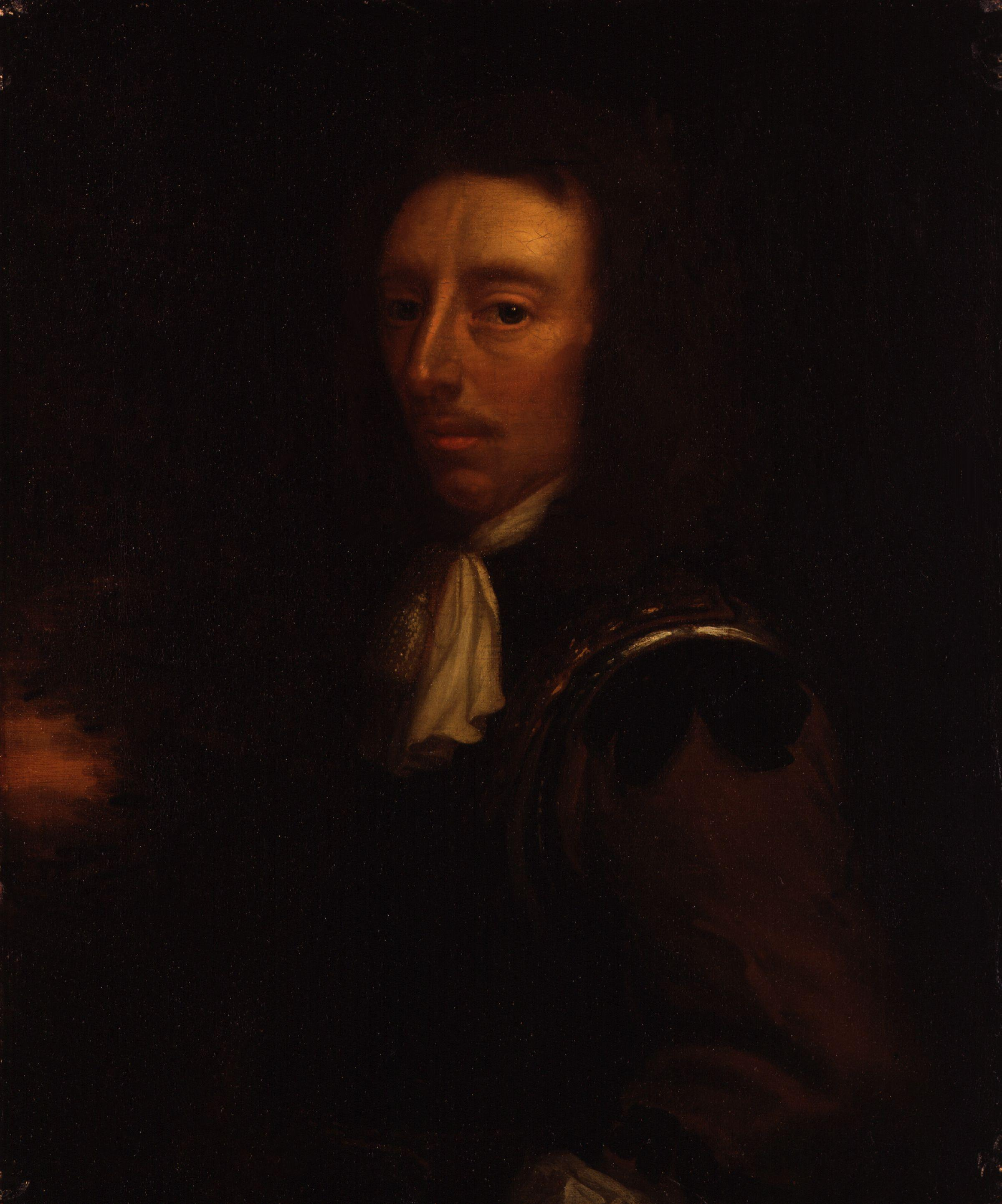
Copy of a 1663 portrait of Sidney by Justus van Egmont (National Portrait Gallery, London)

Sidney was abroad when the monarchy was restored in 1660. His first reaction to the Restoration of the Stuart monarchy was to write:

Since the Parliament hath acknowledged a king, I knowe . . . I owe him duty and the service that belongs unto a subject, and will pay it. If things are carried in a legall and moderate way, I had rather be in employment, than without any.

Because in 1659 he had defended the execution of Charles I, Sidney thought it wise to remain in exile in Rome. While he was prepared to submit he would not, he wrote, countenance "acknowledgement of our faults, in having bin against this king, or his father. ... I shall be better contented with my fortune, when I see theare was noe way of avoiding it, that is not worse than ruine". He was saved by a stranger from an assassination attempt. In 1663 during a trip to the Calvinist academy at the University of Geneva, Sidney wrote in the visitor's book: "SIT SANGUINIS ULTOR JUSTORUM" ("Let there be revenge for the blood of the just"). In Augsburg in April 1665, he was the target of another assassination attempt.

When in Holland, Gilbert Burnet records, Sidney and other republicans:

... came to De Witt, and pressed him to think of an invasion of England and Scotland, and gave him great assurances of a strong party: and they were bringing many officers to Holland to join in the undertaking. They dealt also with some in Amsterdam, who were particularly sharpened against the king, and were for turning England again into a commonwealth. The matter was for some time in agitation at the Hague: but De Witt was against it, and got it to be laid aside. He said, their going into such a design would provoke France to turn against them: it might engage them in a long war, the consequences of which could not be foreseen: and, as there was no reason to think that, while the parliament was so firm to the king, any discontents could be carried so far as to a general rising, which these men undertook for, so, he said, what would the effect be of turning England into a commonwealth, if it could possibly be brought about, but the ruin of Holland? It would naturally draw many of the Dutch to leave their country, that could not be kept and maintained but at a vast charge, and to exchange that with the plenty and security that England afforded. Therefore all that he would engage in was, to weaken the trade of England, and to destroy her fleet; in which he succeeded the following year beyond all expectation.

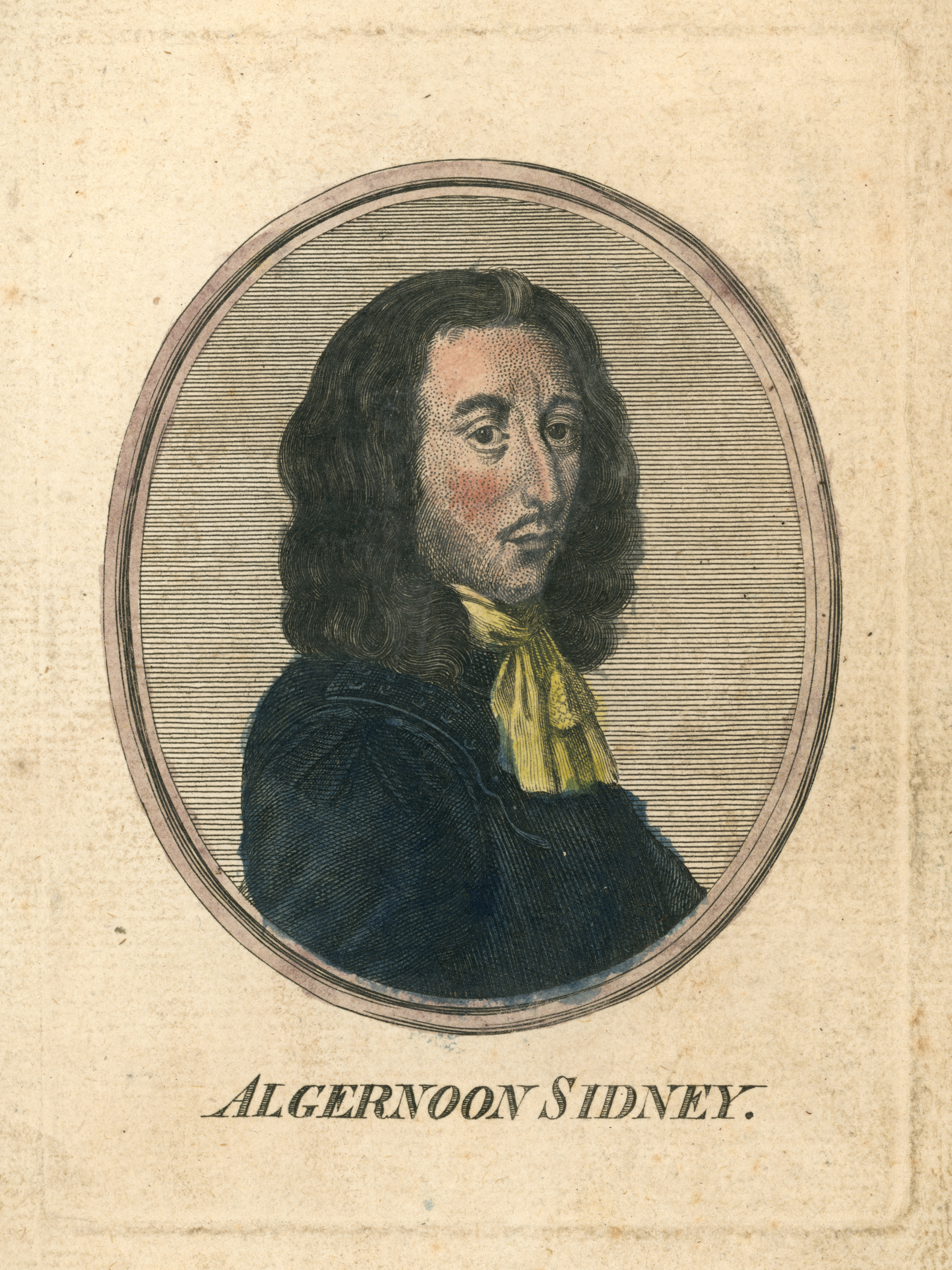
18th century hand-coloured engraving of Sidney

In mid-1666 Sidney was in Paris, where he negotiated with the king, Louis XIV. Louis subsequently wrote that Sidney "promised me to produce a great uprising ... but the proposition he put to me to advance him 100,000 ecus ... was more than I wished to expose on the word of a fugitive [so] I offered him [initially] only 20,000". He remained in France until 1677, when he returned to England.

== Court Maxims ==
During 1665 and 1666 Sidney wrote Court Maxims, in which he argued for a reversal of the Restoration of the monarchy: " ... as death is the greatest evil that can befall a person, monarchy is the worst evil that can befall a nation". Sidney also claimed that an English republic would have a natural "unity of interest" with the Dutch Republic in "extirpat[ing] the two detested families of Stuart and Orange". This manuscript was not widely known, and Court Maxims was not published until 1996.

== Restoration Crisis: 1677–1683 ==
Sidney returned to England in early September 1677. On his father's death, Sidney inherited £5,100, but to obtain his inheritance was forced to bring a lawsuit against his brothers, who as executors of the estate had refused to pay him the money, in the Court of Chancery. Although he won the case the proceedings were lengthy and required him to remain in England for several years. He stayed at Leicester House in London. Here he became involved in politics, with the French ambassador, Paul Barillon writing on 6 October:

At the moment my most intimate liaison is with Mr. Algernon Sidney; he is the man in England who seems to me to have the greatest understanding of affairs; he has great relations with the rest of the Republican party; And nobody in my opinion is more capable of rendering service than him.

Due to his helping gain the fall of Danby in December 1678, Sidney received 500 guineas from the French, getting another 500 guineas the next year. Sidney wished for an alliance of English and Dutch republicans against the Stuart–Orange alliance and told Barillon "that it is an old error to believe that it is against the interest of France to suffer England to become a republic". Sidney believed that it was a "fundamental principle that the House of Stuart and that of Orange are inseparably united".

After the dissolution of Charles II's last Parliament in 1681, Sidney, according to Burnet, helped write the answer to the king's declaration, entitled A Just and Modest Vindication of the Proceedings of the Two Last Parliaments: "An answer was writ to the king's declaration with great spirit and true judgment. It was at first penned by Sidney. But a new draught was made by Somers, and corrected by Jones".

Sidney united with Lord Shaftesbury and others in plotting against the perceived royal tyranny, of a 'force without authority.' Sidney was later to be implicated in the Rye House Plot, a scheme to assassinate Charles and his brother James, who later became King James II.

=== Trial and execution ===
On 25 June 1683 Sidney's arrest warrant was issued. During his arrest his papers were confiscated, including the draft of the Discourses. He was tried on 7 November 1683. William Howard, 3rd Baron Howard of Escrick was the only witness, and since the law stated that two witnesses were necessary, the government used the Discourses as its second witness. Lord Chief Justice Jeffreys (whose conduct of the trial caused much criticism, then and later) ruled: "Scribere est agere" ("to write is to act").

Heneage Finch, the Solicitor General, described the Discourses as "An argument for the people to rise up in arms against the King". In response, Sidney said that it was easy to condemn him by quoting his words out of context: "If you take the scripture to pieces you will make all the penmen of the scripture blasphemous; you may accuse David of saying there is no God and of the Apostles that they were drunk." He argued that he was entitled to write what he chose, as long as he did not publish it. Jeffreys replied that no man has a right to curse the King, in public or in private. Sidney argued that the treason was not accurately defined, that no proof had been given that the papers produced were his, and that, even if that were proved, these papers were in no way connected with the charge. Sidney was found guilty of treason and sentenced to death on 26 November. Jeffreys, ill-tempered as ever, said that he hoped God would put Sidney into a proper state to enter the next world "for I see you are not fit for this one".

In The Apology of Algernon Sydney, in the Day of his Death, Sidney wrote that his life's work was to:

... uphold the Common rights of mankind, the lawes of this land, and the true Protestant religion, against corrupt principles, arbitrary power and Popery ... I doe now willingly lay down my life for the same; and having a sure witness within me, that God doth ... uphold me ... am very littell sollicitous, though man doth condemne me.

He petitioned the King for mercy on the grounds of Jeffreys' unprofessional conduct, and friends and relatives added their pleas: but the King was as implacable as he had been in the case of William Russell, Lord Russell. Sidney now resigned himself to death, remarking coarsely that for all he cared "the King can make a snuffbox from my arse".

On the scaffold, Sidney argued that his conviction was unlawful, disputing the quality of the evidence against him and pointing out various deviations from proper legal procedure at his trial. He also reiterated his objections to absolute monarchy in Discourses Concerning Government, arguing that these did not constitute treason. Still, he observed that he was abstaining from tackling truly "great matters" in this last speech of his, because "We live in an age that makes truth pass for treason". He concluded by declaring that he was dying for the Good Old Cause.

Sidney was beheaded on 7 December 1683, and his remains were buried at Penshurst.

== Discourses Concerning Government ==
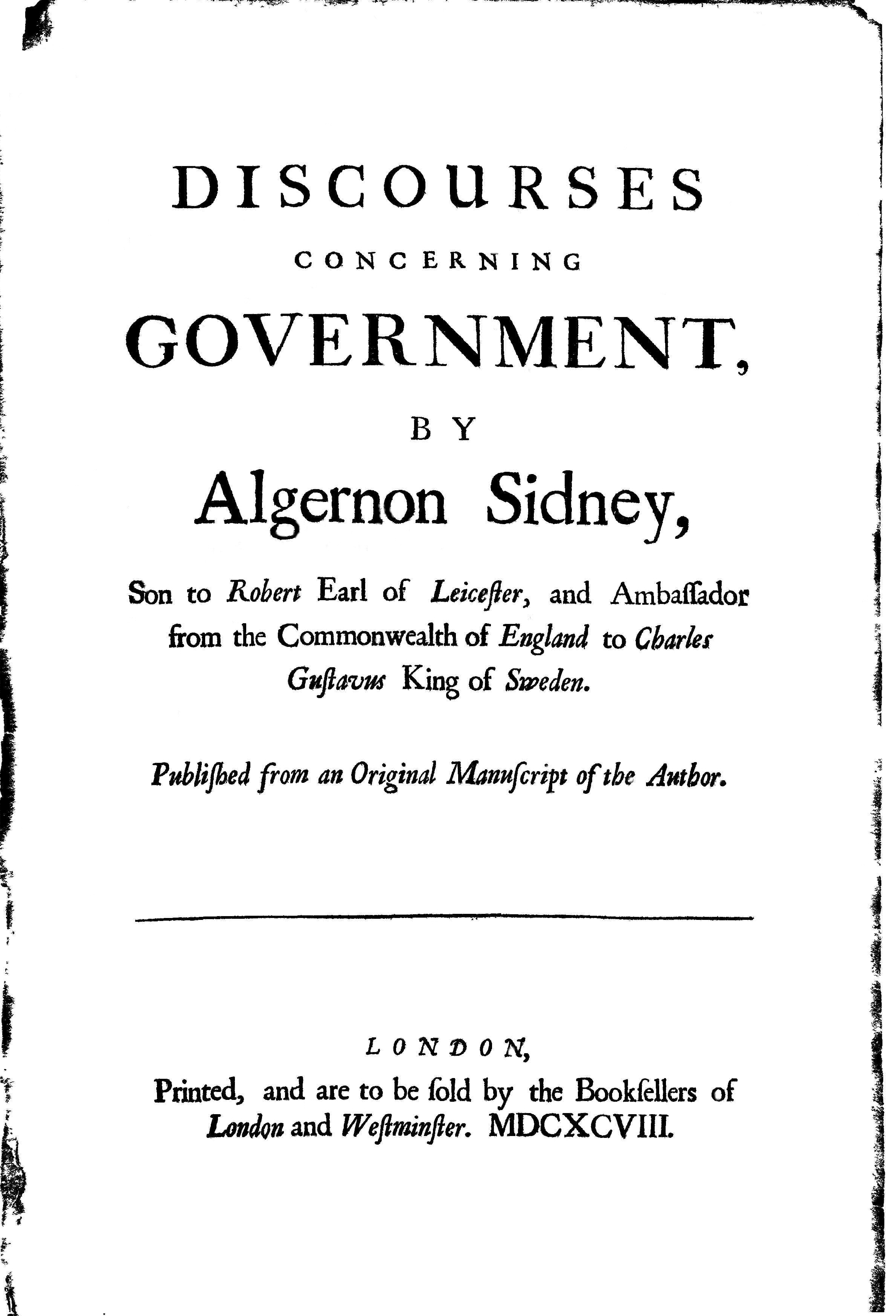
Sidney, Algernon: Discourses concerning government, London 1698

For Sidney absolute monarchy was a great political evil. His Discourses Concerning Government (the text for which Sidney lost his life) was written during the Exclusion Crisis, as a response to Robert Filmer's Patriarcha, a defence of divine right monarchy, first published in 1680. The divine right of kings is a political system in which all powers of government are vested solely in the king and granted to him by God. Under this system, the king acts as God's hand on earth. His power extends beyond government into the private religious life of his subjects. Under this system, citizens were often persecuted and imprisoned for their religious beliefs. It is this divine right of kings' government that Sidney strongly opposed. In 1698, his Discourses Concerning Government was published outlining what he believed constituted a valid civil government.

Sidney believed that individuals have the right to choose their own form of government and that, if that government became corrupt, the people retained the power to abolish it and form another. In his own words, "God leaves to man the choice of forms in government ... He who institutes, may also abrogate".

Sidney also argued that for a valid civil government to exist, it must be formed by general and voluntary consent. Sidney states in his Discourses Concerning Government that, "General consent ... is the ground of all just governments".

Furthermore, Sidney believed that civil government should have limited jurisdiction. He said the, "only ends for which governments are constituted and obedience rendered to them, are the obtaining of justice and protection". This suggests a limited civil government whose primary purpose is to 1) render legal justice through its court system and 2) provide for the safety of its citizens. We can also conclude from Sidney that, if a government fails to accomplish these basic components, obedience to that government is no longer required.

Sidney's Discourses Concerning Government along with Locke's Two Treatises on Government are recognized as critical works in the founding of the United States of America. The founding fathers read and studied these works during their years as students in the early colonial universities. Thomas Jefferson in particular, is known to have heavily studied and researched the works of Locke and Sidney. The Discourses Concerning Government has been called the "textbook of the American Revolution.

== Legacy ==
After his death, Sidney was revered as the "Whig patriot—hero and martyr". Burnet said of Sidney:

... a man of the most extraordinary courage, a steady man, even to obstinacy, sincere, but of a rough and boisterous temper, that could not bear contradiction, but would give foul language upon it. He seemed to be a Christian, but in a particular form of his own. He thought it was to be like a divine philosophy in the mind, but he was against all public worship, and every thing that looked like church. He was stiff to all republican principles, and such an enemy to every thing that looked like monarchy, that he set himself in a high opposition against Cromwell when he was made protector. He had indeed studied the history of government in all its branches beyond any man I ever knew.

Sidney's influence on political thought in eighteenth-century Britain and Colonial America was probably second only to that of John Locke among seventeenth-century political theorists. In his study of political theory in Britain from 1689 to 1720, J. P. Kenyon said that Sidney's Discourses "were certainly much more influential than Locke's Two Treatises". The poet James Thomson, in his poem The Seasons, praised Sidney as "the British Cassius", the hero "warmed" by "ancient learning to the enlightened love/Of ancient freedom".

Sidney's reputation suffered a blow when Sir John Dalrymple published his Memoirs of Great Britain and Ireland in 1771, which exposed him as a pensioner of Louis XIV. Dalrymple, who had greatly admired Sidney, wrote that he would hardly feel more shame if he had seen his own son run away from a battle.

The Whig MP Charles James Fox described Sidney and Lord Russell as "two names that will, it is hoped, be ever dear to every English heart" and predicted that "when their memory shall cease to be an object of respect and veneration ... English liberty will be fast approaching its final consummation".

Sidney had a significant effect on the American conception of liberty. He was a hero of John Trenchard and Thomas Gordon, "the best-read and most widely regarded pamphleteers of prerevolutionary times". In their 1720–1723 essays Cato's Letters, they adopted Sidney's argument that "free men always have the right to resist tyrannical government"; those essays, in turn, inspired the name of the modern libertarian think tank the Cato Institute. Thomas Jefferson believed Sidney and Locke to be the two primary sources for the Founding Fathers' view of liberty.

John Adams wrote to Jefferson in 1823 on the subject of Sidney:

I have lately undertaken to read Algernon Sidney on government. ... As often as I have read it, and fumbled it over, it now excites fresh admiration [i.e., wonder] that this work has excited so little interest in the literary world. As splendid an edition of it as the art of printing can produce—as well for the intrinsic merit of the work, as for the proof it brings of the bitter sufferings of the advocates of liberty from that time to this, and to show the slow progress of moral, philosophical, and political illumination in the world—ought to be now published in America.

The Whig historian Thomas Babington Macaulay said of Sidney in 1828:

Never was there less of national feeling among the higher orders than during the reign of Charles the Second. That Prince, on the one side, thought it better to be the deputy of an absolute king than the King of a free people. Algernon Sidney, on the other hand, would gladly have aided France in all her ambitious schemes, and have seen England reduced to the condition of a province, in the wild hope that a foreign despot would assist him to establish his darling republic.

But in 1848, Macaulay wrote of the Whig opposition to Charles II:

It would be unjust to impute to them the extreme wickedness of taking bribes to injure their country. On the contrary, they meant to serve her: but it is impossible to deny that they were mean and indelicate enough to let a foreign prince pay them for serving her. Among those who cannot be acquitted of this degrading charge was one man who is popularly considered as the personification of public spirit, and who, in spite of some great moral and intellectual faults, has a just claim to be called a hero, a philosopher, and a patriot. It is impossible to see without pain such a name in the list of the pensioners of France. Yet it is some consolation to reflect that, in our time, a public man would be thought lost to all sense of duty and of shame, who should not spurn from him a temptation which conquered the virtue and the pride of Algernon Sidney.

The libertarian philosopher Friedrich Hayek quoted Sidney's Discourses on the title page of his The Constitution of Liberty: "Our inquiry is not after that which is perfect, well knowing that no such thing is found among men; but we seek that human Constitution which is attended with the least, or the most pardonable inconveniences".

Algernon Sidney is one of the namesakes for Hampden–Sydney College in Virginia. The college formerly used the original spelling of Sidney. He was chosen because of the role his ideas played in moulding the beliefs of the American Revolutionary thinkers.

Sidney became widely used as a given name in the United States after the American Revolution due to admiration for Algernon Sidney as a martyr to royal tyranny.

== Works ==
- The Lady of May (1578-79)=A masque performed for Elizabeth.
- Sidney, Algernon: Discourses Concerning Government (London, 1698, and later editions);
- Sidney, Algernon: Apology in the Day of His Death;
- Sidney, Algernon: The Administration and the Opposition. Addressed to the Citizens of New-Hampshire (Concord, Jacob B. Moore, 1826, ASIN B000IUQ14Q)
- Sidney, Algernon: Algernon Sidneys Betrachtungen über Regierungsformen (Leipzig, Weygand, 1793: German translation of Discourses Concerning Government)
- Sidney, Algernon: Discourses Concerning Government, ed. Thomas G. West (Indianapolis, 1996, ISBN 0865971420)
- Sidney, Algernon: Court Maxims, Cambridge University Press, in series Cambridge Texts in the History of Political Thought, 1996, ISBN 978-0521461757)
- Sidney, Algernon: Discourses on Government. To Which is Added, An Account of the Author's Life (The Lawbook Exchange, New York, 2002 reprint, ISBN 1584772093)

See also: Published literature from and about Algernon Sidney.

== Bibliography ==
- Airy, Osmund, ed. (1897). Burnet's History of My Own Time. A New Edition based on that of M.J. Routh, D.D. Part I. The Reign of Charles the Second. Vol. I. Oxford: Clarendon Press.
- Airy, Osmund, ed. (1900), Burnet's History of My Own Time. A New Edition based on that of M.J. Routh, D.D. Part I. The Reign of Charles the Second, vol. II, Oxford: Clarendon Press
- Airy, Osmund (1911). "Sidney, Algernon" . In Chisholm, Hugh (ed.). Encyclopædia Britannica. Vol. 25 (11th ed.). Cambridge University Press. p. 42.
- Doherty, Brian (2007). Radicals for Capitalism: A Freewheeling History of the Modern American Libertarian Movement. p. 26.
- Karsten, Peter (1978). Patriot heroes in England and America: Political symbolism and changing values over three centuries. Madison: University of Wisconsin Press. ISBN 0299075001.
- Kenyon, J.P. (1977). Revolution Principles. The Politics of Party, 1689–1720. Cambridge University Press. p. 51.
- Langford, Paul (1998). A Polite and Commercial People: England 1727–1783. Oxford University Press. p. 529.
- Macaulay, Thomas Babington (1874). Critical and Historical Essays. London: Longman.
- Macaulay, Thomas Babington (1889). The History of England from the Accession of James the Second. Vol. I (In two volumes, popular ed.). London: Longmans.
- Robbins, Caroline (1947). "Algernon Sidney's Discourses Concerning Government: Textbook of Revolution". William and Mary Quarterly. 3rd. 4 (3): 266–296. doi:10.2307/1917334. JSTOR 1917334.
- Scott, Jonathan (1991). Algernon Sidney and the Restoration Crisis, 1677–1683. Cambridge University Press. ISBN 978-0521352918.
- Scott, Jonathan (January 2008) [2004]. "Sidney [Sydney], Algernon (1623–1683)". Oxford Dictionary of National Biography (online ed.). Oxford University Press. doi:10.1093/ref:odnb/25519. (Subscription, Wikipedia Library access or UK public library membership required.) The first edition of this text is available at Wikisource: "Sidney, Algernon" . Dictionary of National Biography. London: Smith, Elder & Co. 1885–1900.
- Sidney, Algernon (25 October 2006) [1683]. Colonel Sidney's Speech Delivered to the sheriff on the scaffold December 7th 1683. Department of History, University of Wisconsin.
- Sidney, Algernon (1996). West, Thomas G. (ed.). Discourses Concerning Government. Indianapolis. ISBN 0865971420., with...
- West, Thomas G. (1996). "Foreword". Discourses Concerning Government. Indianapolis: Liberty Fund. ISBN 0865971412.
- Worden, Blair (2002). Roundhead Reputations. The English Civil Wars and the Passions of Posterity. Penguin. pp. 122, 152.

Preceded by John Boys	Lord Warden of the Cinque Ports; 1648–1651	Succeeded by Thomas Kelsey
Parliament of England
Preceded by Not represented 1642–1645; William Herbert 1640–1642	Member of Parliament for Cardiff; 1645–1653	Succeeded by Not represented in Barebones Parliament of 1653; John Price 1654–1660
