= George Howard (died 1671) =

English politician

George Howard or Halsey (1622 – 17 September 1671) was an English politician who sat in the House of Commons between 1660 and 1671.

Howard was the son of Lady Mary Howard, daughter of Sir John Fitz of Fitzford. She was married four times and had been estranged from her third husband, Sir Charles Howard of Clun Castle Shropshire, for 18 months when she gave birth to Howard in "some obscure place near London". His father was alleged to be a servant George Cuttford of Walreddon, Whitchurch, Devon. The child was christened George Halsey and his existence concealed until he was nine years old. His mother married Sir Richard Grenville, 1st Baronet after the death of Sir Charles Howard although they were separated during the Civil War, and later when he was banished.

Howard was commissioner for militia for Devon in March 1660. In April 1660, he was elected Member of Parliament in a double return at both Tavistock and Bere Alston. In both cases he was allowed to sit on the merits of the election and chose to sit for Tavistock in the Convention Parliament. He was commissioner for assessment from September 1660 to 1669. In 1661 he was again elected in double returns for both Bere Alston and Tavistock and chose Tavistock again in the Cavalier Parliament. He was portreeve at Bere Alston from 1661 to 1662. He was J.P. from after 1666 to 1669.

Howard died at the age of about 48 and was buried at Tavistock.

Howard married Mary Burnby, daughter of Richard Burnby of Bratton Clovelly, Devon on 10 September 1655.

Parliament of England
| Preceded by Not represented in Restored Rump | Member of Parliament for Bere Alston; 1660; With: John Maynard | Succeeded by John Maynard; Richard Arundell |
| Preceded by John Maynard; Richard Arundell | Member of Parliament for Bere Alston; 1661; With: Sir John Maynard | Succeeded by Richard Arundell; Sir John Maynard |
| Preceded by Not represented in Restored Rump | Member of Parliament for Tavistock; 1660–1671; With: William Russell 1660; Sir John Davie, 2nd Baronet 1661; William Russell 1661–1671 | Succeeded by William Russell; Sir Francis Drake, 3rd Baronet |
