= Paul Barillon =

French ambassador

Paul Barillon d'Amoncourt, the marquis de Branges (1630–1691), was the French ambassador to England from 1677 to 1688. His dispatches from England to Louis XIV have been very useful to historians of the period, though they may be colored by a personal bias. With the rise to the throne of England by William of Orange, Louis XIV's most implacable enemy, Barillon was sent home and war soon broke out between the two kingdoms. Barillon's immediate predecessor was Rouvigny; his successor after the war was Camille de Tallard.

== Family and early career ==
He was the son of Jean-Jacques de Barillon, Master of Requests of the Parlement of Paris. He acquired the Branges and Amoncourt titles by inheritance from his uncle Antoine, who had married the Amoncourt heiress. In 1663 he married Marie Madeleine Mangot: they had three children, Antoine, Philiberte and Bonne.

He was successively Intendant of Paris (1666), Flanders (1667) and Amiens (1668). In 1673 he was one of the French plenipotentiaries to the Congress of Cologne. In 1681 he became a Councillor of State.

== Ambassador to England ==
Both Charles II and James II invariably treated Barillon with great courtesy: one historian refers to his "rather pampered existence at Whitehall". Both monarchs appeared to confide in him, although it is not always clear that they were entirely frank. Charles II, at the outbreak of the Popish Plot, did tell Barillon openly that Titus Oates, the inventor of the Plot, was a villain, and that the Plot itself was an invention, but that it would be unwise to say so publicly.

Barillon was often a conduit for pleas for clemency to Charles, (sometimes acting on the family's behalf, in which case he would accept money in return, but sometimes conveying King Louis's own view). However these were not always well received; the King simply brushed aside his plea for the life of William, Lord Russell, and explained that while Oliver Plunkett, the Catholic Archbishop of Armagh, was certainly an innocent man, it was not expedient to spare him, for "My enemies are still waiting for me to make a false step". It is interesting that in both these cases Barillon was conveying the French King's view. Charles's remark to Barillon that his brother James's public conversion to Roman Catholicism had weakened his position is important evidence that Charles postponed his own conversion until he was dying.

The marriage of the future Queen Anne to George of Denmark, brother of France's ally, was a triumph for French diplomacy, and it was probably Barillon who originally proposed the marriage, although he did not play a major role in subsequent negotiations, which were mainly conducted by Lord Sunderland. Like most of those who met him, Barillon found the groom entirely unimpressive. As a counterweight, he intrigued with the Whig leaders, notably Algernon Sidney, whose posthumous reputation was greatly damaged by the discovery that Barillon had paid him regular bribes. The Popish Plot, with the wave of anti-Catholic and anti-French hysteria it produced, was in itself unwelcome to Barillon, but he turned it to advantage by helping to bring down the Earl of Danby, the main exponent of a Protestant, pro-Dutch, anti-Catholic foreign policy, by assisting in the publication of letters, which taken out of context, suggested secret intrigues between Danby and the French Court. After the failure of the Exclusion Bill, Barillon records the King telling him in strict confidence that he had been tempted to let it pass. Even Barillon, an astute diplomat, admitted to finding Charles unfathomable: "his conduct so secret and impenetrable that even the most skilful observers are misled".

Only once does he seem to have committed a serious diplomatic blunder: late in 1679 an indiscreet letter of his, reporting a conversation where Charles II claimed to have personally blocked a Franco-Dutch treaty, was leaked in the Netherlands. It caused an uproar, and Charles was so angry with Barillon that he forbade him the Court for a time. Sunderland, who had probably leaked the letter, remarked complacently that "I do not question M. Barillon finds himself embarrassed, but when anybody will play such tricks, it is but just that it should come home to him at last". His disgrace was temporary, but afterwards he was far more careful about what he committed to paper. At other times his relations with Sunderland were amicable enough, although Sunderland sometimes treated him to his famous outbursts of rudeness, and on one occasion Barillon told him that he would not report his remarks if he could not control himself. When it was rumoured in 1685 that the French had given tacit support to Monmouth's Rebellion, Sunderland told Barillon pointedly that he hoped this was a misunderstanding, or else the English would wonder if Louis had 'other plans they could not discern'. Later Sunderland mocked Louis' vaunted desire for European peace, saying brutally to Barillon that the peace would last until it was in someone's interest to break it.

Barillon's privileged position was confirmed in the last days of Charles II's reign, when, alone among the diplomatic corps, he was allowed to send a secret message to Louis XIV that the King was dying. In the events leading to Charles' deathbed reception into the Roman Catholic Church, he played a role of some importance. While the King's brother James was already convinced of his brother's wish to convert, it was Barillon, prompted by Louise de Kéroualle, who urged James to act at once. Together they visited the dying King, and Barillon witnessed Charles' statement that he wished to be received "with all his heart".

Immediately after the Glorious Revolution of 1688, William of Orange expelled Barillon from England as an insult to the French. He had him escorted to the coast under a guard of French Huguenot exiles. He died soon after in France.

== Personal traits ==
James II's biographer describes him as an astute diplomat, with an ability to convey information through subtle hints, but he was personally a rather unattractive individual, being heavy, gross and boorish.

Famous French fabulist Jean de La Fontaine dedicated a poem to him entitled "Le pouvoir des fables."
