= William Russell, Lord Russell =

English politician (1639–1683)

The Right Honourable Lord Russell
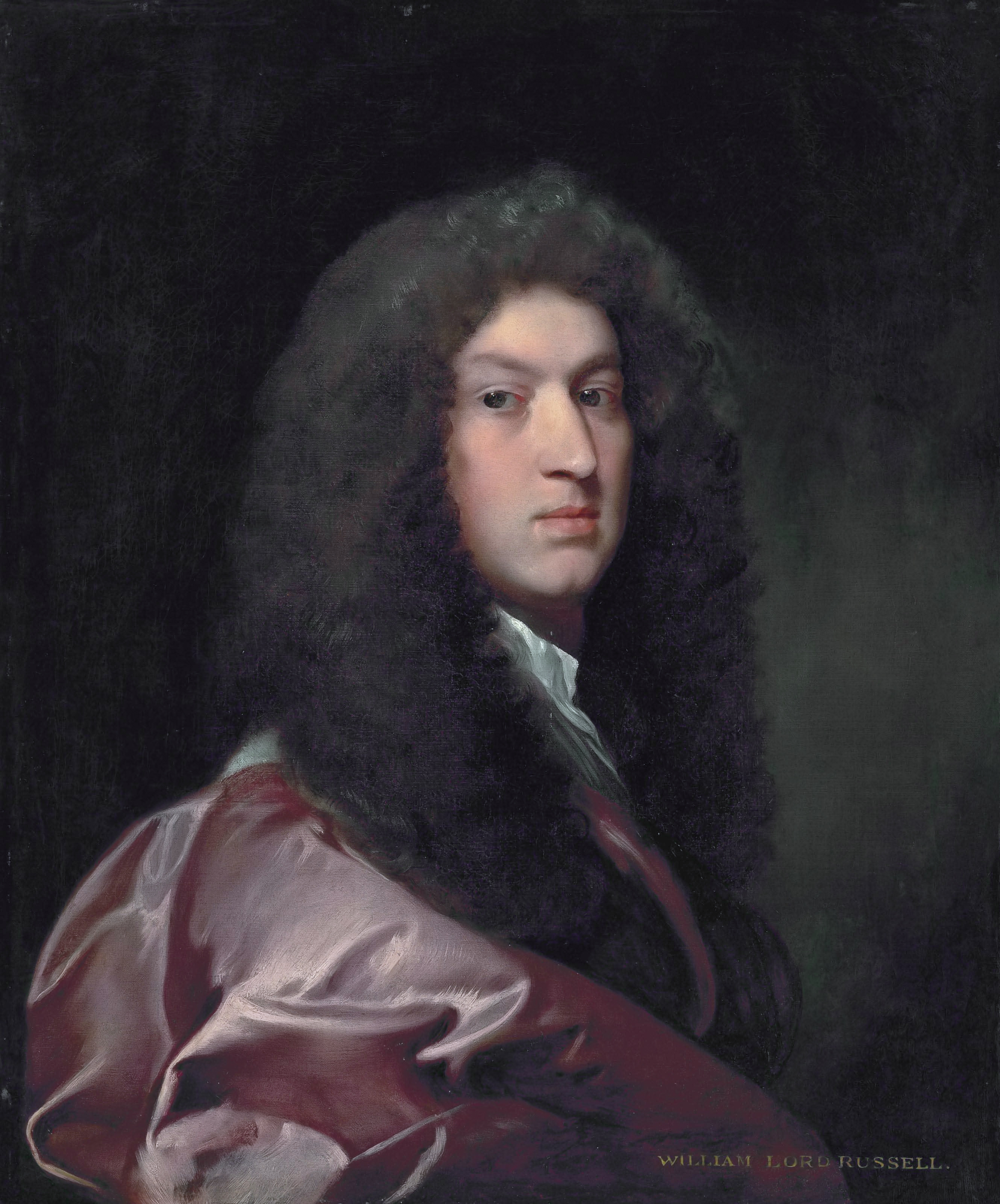
- Portrait by Gerard Soest
- Born: 29 September 1639
- Died: 21 July 1683 (aged 43); Lincoln's Inn Fields
- Cause of death: Execution by beheading
- Education: Cambridge University
- Occupation: Member of Parliament
- Spouse: Rachel Wriothesley
- Children: Anne Russell; Rachel Cavendish, Duchess of Devonshire; Catherine Russell; Wriothesley Russell, 2nd Duke of Bedford
- Parents: William Russell, 5th Earl of Bedford; Lady Anne Carr

William Russell, Lord Russell (29 September 1639 – 21 July 1683) was an English Country Party politician. He was a leading member of the Country Party, forerunners of the Whigs, who during the reign of Charles II of England laid the groundwork for opposition in the English House of Commons to the accession of an openly Catholic monarch in Charles's brother James. This ultimately resulted in Russell's execution for treason, almost two years before Charles died and James acceded to the throne.

== Early life and marriage ==
Born Hon. William Russell, he was the third son of William Russell, 5th Earl of Bedford, later created Duke of Bedford, and Lady Anne Carr. After the death of his elder brother Francis, he gained the courtesy title of Baron Russell and was thus referred to as Lord Russell.

He and Francis were at Cambridge University in 1654. They then travelled abroad, visiting Lyon and Geneva, residing for a time at Augsburg. Russell's account makes for a colourful depiction of his travels. The two made their way to Paris by 1658, and had returned to Woburn Abbey, Woburn (which was not then in its present palatial form) by December 1659.

At the Restoration in 1660, when Charles II took the throne, Russell was elected as a Member of Parliament for the borough of Tavistock, a seat traditionally held by a member of his family. For many years, Russell appears not to have been active in public affairs, but to have indulged in court intrigue, and is not recorded as speaking until 1674. In 1663 and 1664 he was engaged in two duels; he was wounded in the second one. In 1669, at age 30, he married the widowed Lady Vaughn. He thus became connected with the Earl of Shaftesbury, who had married his wife's cousin. They had a close and affectionate marriage.

== Parliament ==
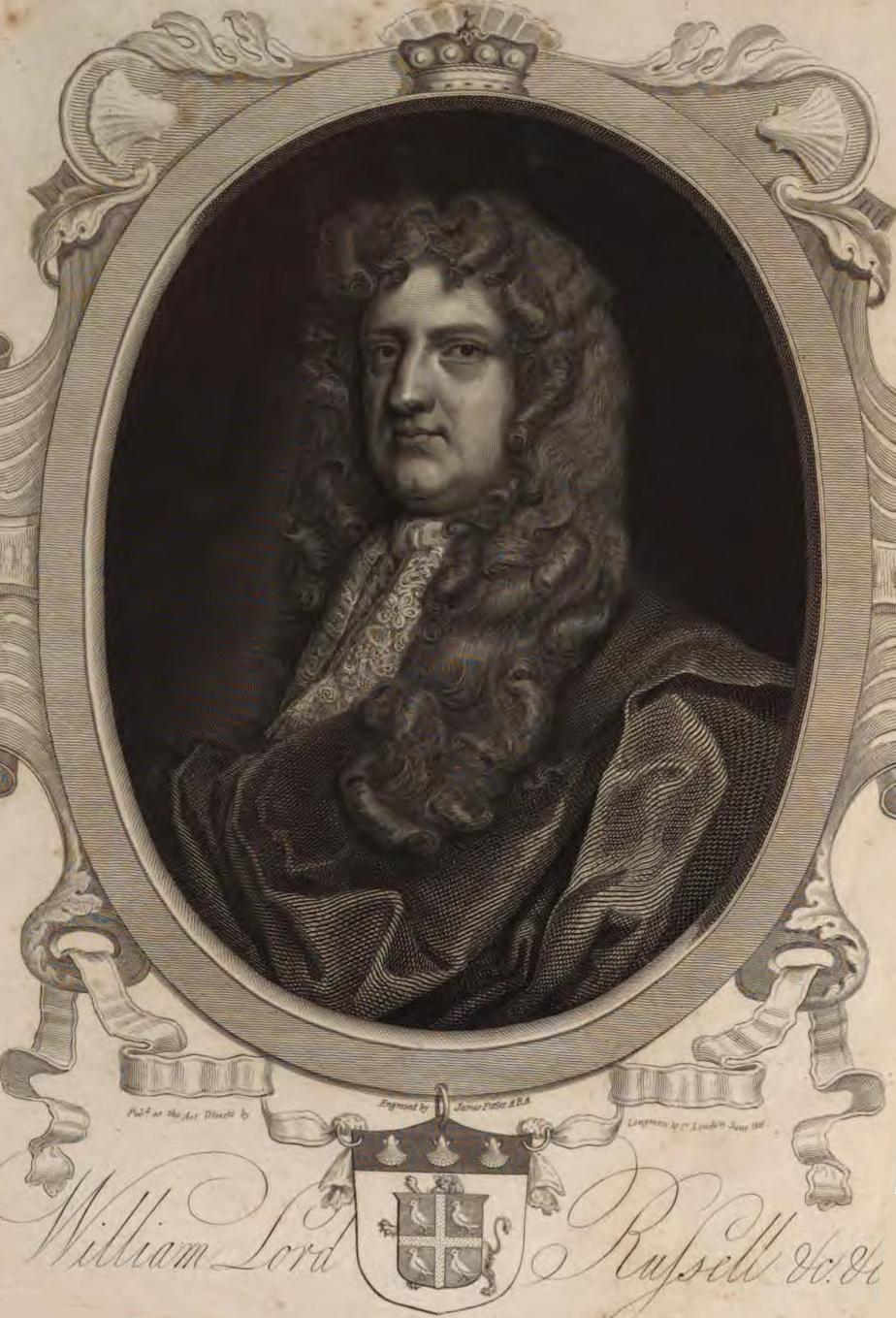
William, Lord Russell

It was not until the formation of the country party (the forerunner of the Whig party), which opposed the policies of the Cabal (the inner group of advisers to the king) and Charles II's Franco-Catholic policies, that Russell began to take an active part in affairs. With a passionate zeal against Roman Catholicism ("I despise such a ridiculous and nonsensical religion" he once remarked), and an intense love of political liberty, he opposed the persecution of Protestant Dissenters. His first speech in Parliament appears to have been on 22 January 1674, when he inveighed against the Great Stop of the Exchequer, the attack on the Smyrna fleet, the corruption by French money of Charles's courtiers, and the ill-intended ministers of the king. He also supported the proceedings against the Duke of Buckingham. In 1675, Russell moved an address to the king for the removal from royal councils and impeachment of the Earl of Danby.

On 15 February 1677, in the debate on the 15 months' prorogation (an extremely lengthy period between sessions of Parliament), he moved the dissolution of Parliament; and in March 1678 he seconded the address that asked the king to declare war against France. The enmity of the country party towards James, the Duke of York, and towards Lord Danby, and the party's desire for a dissolution and the disbanding of the army, were greater than the party's enmity towards Louis XIV of France. The French king, therefore, found it easy to form a temporary alliance with Russell, Holles and the opposition leaders. They sought to cripple the king's power of hurting France and to compel him to seek Louis's friendship; that friendship, however, was to be given only on the condition that Louis support their goals. Russell entered into close communication with the Marquis de Ruvigny (Lady Russell's maternal cousin), who came over to England with money for distribution among members of parliament. By the testimony of Barillon, however, it is clear that Russell himself refused to take any French payments.

== The alleged Popish Plot and the Monmouth Rebellion ==
Anti-French, warmongering alarms which culminated in the "discovery" in 1678 of the first "conspirators" of an alleged Popish Plot to treacherously murder King Charles II and accelerate the accession of his Roman Catholic brother, appear to have affected Russell more than his otherwise sober character would have led people to expect. Russell threw himself into the small party which looked to James Scott, 1st Duke of Monmouth ("Monmouth") to take the throne, an (illegitimate but recognised) son of Charles, as the representative of Protestant interests, a political blunder. Undaunted, Russell afterwards was in confidential communication with William of Orange who, with his wife Mary, came to the throne five years after Russell's execution.

== Exclusion debates ==
On 4 November 1678, Russell moved an address to the King to exclude his brother James (at the time the Duke of York) "from his person and councils" (homes, companionship and correspondence), including removal from the line of succession. Parliament's insistence on the impeachment of Danby led to it being prorogued on 30 December and dissolved in January. At the ensuing election, Russell was again elected to Parliament, this time as a representative for Bedfordshire, as well as for Hampshire (for which he chose not to sit). The success of the newly formed "party" in the elections of 1679 led to Danby's removal from cabinet, and in April 1679 Russell became a member of the new Privy Council ministry formed by Charles on the advice of Sir William Temple of Temple Mount, East Sheen. Only six days after this, Russell moved for a committee to draw up a more subdued bill "to secure religion and property [in case of] a popish successor". In June 1679, when the Covenanters were rising in Scotland, he verbally attacked (the Duke of) Lauderdale personally in full council.

The Trial of William, Lord Russell, in 1683 by Sir George Hayter, painted in 1825 as a commission by his descendant The 6th Duke of Bedford

In January 1680, Russell, along with Cavendish, Capell, Powle, and Essex, tendered resignation, which was received by King Charles "with all my heart." On 16 June, he accompanied Shaftesbury when the latter indicted James at Westminster as a popish recusant; and on 26 October, he spoke in the house to move to "suppress popery and prevent a popish successor"; while on 2 November, now at the height of his influence, he seconded the motion for exclusion in its most emphatic shape, and on 19 November physically carried the exclusion bill to the House of Lords. He opposed the limitation scheme on the ground that monarchy under its conditions would be an absurdity. The historian Laurence Echard stated that Russell opposed the indulgence exercised by Charles to the Duke of Norfolk's cousin, Lord Stafford, who was a convicted "plotter", in preventing a more painful method of execution—an indulgence afterwards shown to Russell himself but other historians disagree. On 18 December, he moved to refuse supplies until the king passed the Exclusion Bill. The Prince of Orange having come over at this time, the opposition leaders were open to a compromise on the exclusion question. Russell, however, refused to give way.

On 26 March 1681, in the parliament held at Oxford, Russell again seconded the Exclusion Bill. Upon the dissolution of parliament, he retired into privacy at his country seat of Stratton in Hampshire. It was probably at his wish that his chaplain wrote the Life of Julian the Apostate, in reply to Dr Hickes's sermons, defending the lawfulness of resistance in extreme cases.

== Rye House Plot ==
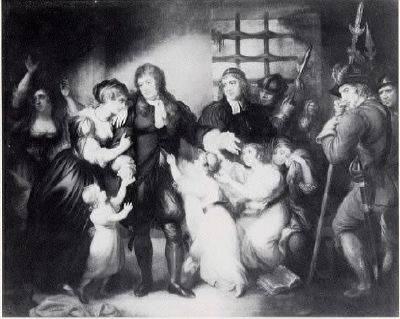
William, Lord Russell (1639–1683), in the Tower of London – painter: Mather Brown

Russell had no share in the schemes of Whig Lord Shaftesbury after the election of Tory sheriffs for London in 1682; upon the 1683 violation of the charters, however, he began seriously to consider the best means of resisting the King's government. In October 1682, he attended a meeting at which what might be construed as treason was talked: Monmouth, Essex, Hampden, Algernon Sidney, Lord Howard of Escrick (a cousin of Russell's mother) and Sir Thomas Armstrong met at the house of one Mr Sheppard, a wine merchant. There they met Richard Rumbold, the owner of Rye House, a fortified mansion in Hertfordshire. It was thought that Russell's participation in particular was motivated by fears that with a Catholic king his family could lose land that they had gained in the Dissolution of the Monasteries.

This was followed by the unsuccessful Rye House Plot, a plan to ambush Charles II and his brother James near Rye House, Hoddesdon, on their way back to London from the Newmarket races. However, the plot was disclosed to the government. Unlike several co-conspirators, Russell refused to escape to Holland. He was accused of promising his assistance to raise an insurrection and bring about the death of the king. He was sent on 26 June 1683 to the Tower of London where he prepared himself for his death. Monmouth offered to return to England and be tried if doing so would help Russell, and Essex refused to abscond for fear of injuring his friend's chance of escape. However, he was tried and convicted of treason and sentenced to be hanged, drawn and quartered, afterwards commuted by Charles II to death by beheading.

By the standards of the time (when those charged with treason rarely escaped death) he received a fair trial. Lord Chief Justice Francis Pemberton, in his summing up to the jury, clearly leant towards an acquittal, thereby offending the King, who dismissed him soon afterwards. No defence counsel was permitted in a treason trial until the passing of the Treason Act 1695, but in a rare concession to the defence, Lady Russell was allowed to act as her husband's secretary. Even Jeffreys, leading for the prosecution, conducted the trial in a sober and dignified manner quite different from his normal bullying style, and, while stressing the strength of the evidence, reminded the jury that no innocent man should have his life taken away.

After the verdict Russell's wife and friends made desperate efforts to save him, making pleas for mercy to the King, the Duke of York, and the French Ambassador, Paul Barillon. Barillon informed the King that in the view of Louis XIV this was a suitable case for mercy, and James was at least prepared to listen to Russell's friends; but Charles was implacable, saying "if I do not take his life he will shortly take mine." Russell himself, in petitions to Charles and James, offered to live abroad if his life were spared, and never again to meddle in the affairs of England. He, however, refused an offer of escape from Cavendish. Lady Russell obtained a private interview and went on her knees to the King, but to no avail.

== Execution ==
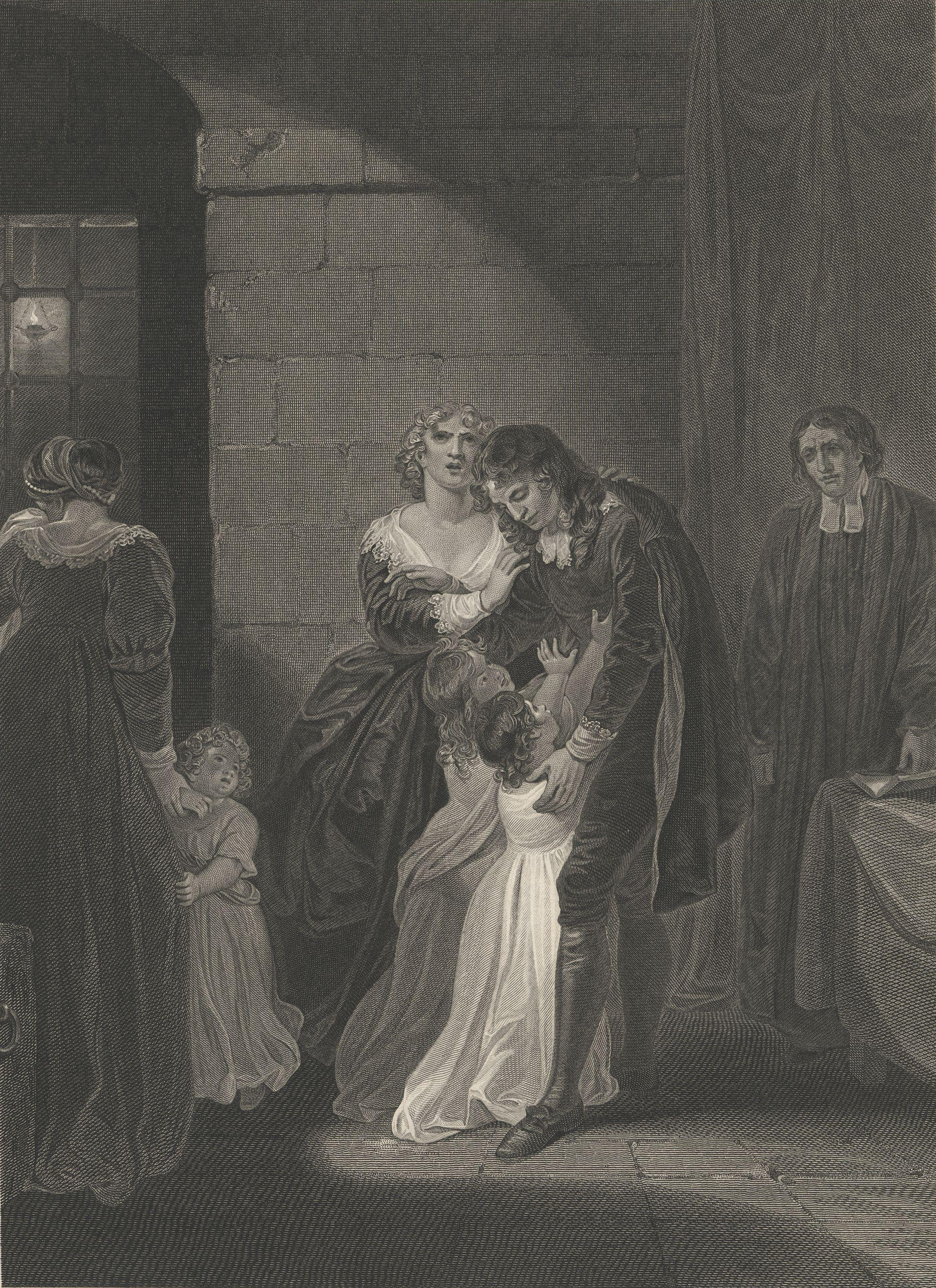
18th-century artist's impression of Lord Russell's last moment with his family before his execution

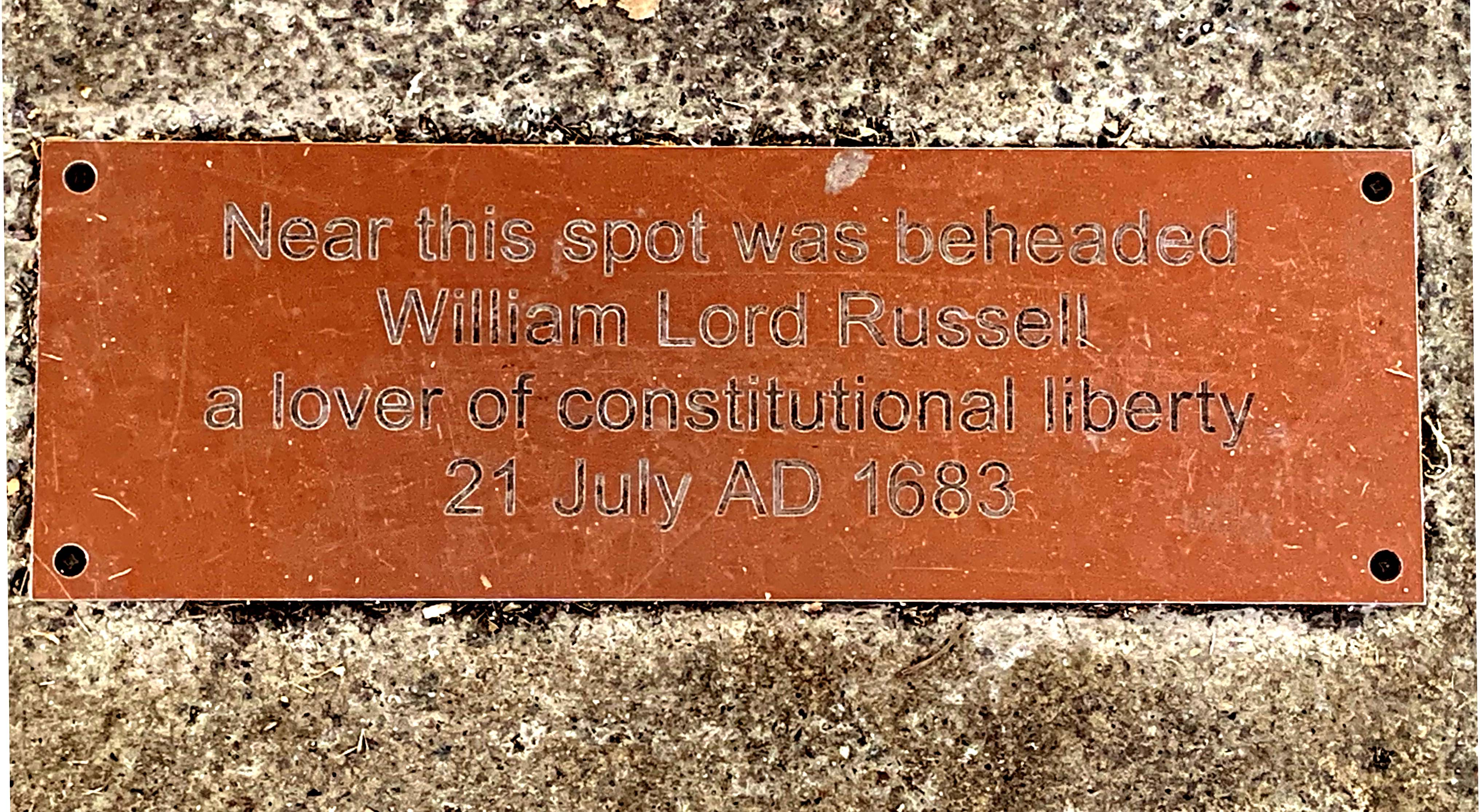
Plaque commemorating the execution of William Lord Russell in Lincoln's Inn Fields

Russell spent his last day peacefully in the Tower, spending the morning in devotions with the Scottish archbishop Alexander Burnet. He was beheaded by Jack Ketch on 21 July 1683 at Lincoln's Inn Fields. Russell was said to have paid Ketch a generous sum of money beforehand for a quick and painless end. At the time, those sentenced to death by beheading (a method "reserved for [...] aristocrats") were customarily "advised to tip the public executioner in advance. It was hoped this would encourage him to do a swift and efficient job, hopefully despatching the victim in one clean blow." However, in spite of this, the execution was reported to have been notoriously botched:

On that occasion, Ketch wielded the instrument of death either with such sadistically nuanced skill or with such lack of simple dexterity – nobody could tell which – that the victim suffered horrifically under blow after blow, each excruciating but not in itself lethal. Even among the bloodthirsty throngs that habitually attended English beheadings, the gory and agonizing display had created such outrage that Ketch felt moved to write and publish a pamphlet titled Apologie, in which he excused his performance with the claim that Lord Russell had failed to "dispose himself as was most suitable" and that he was therefore distracted while taking aim on his neck.

According to the pamphlet, Ketch allegedly "did such a bad job that, after the axe hit the side of Russell's head, Russell looked up at him and said, 'You dog, did I give you ten guineas to use me so inhumanely?'" However, Ketch "repudiated the charge" that Russell had paid him twenty guineas the night before the execution (although he stated it was "true I receav'd 10. Guenies" from him on the scaffold), that Russell had insulted him, or that he had struck Russell's shoulder rather than his head. However, although biographer Sidney Lee contended that the pamphlet was "probably written by Ketch himself", author Stephen Wade describes the provenance of The Apology of John Ketch Esq. as "questionable".

Russell was exonerated by reversal of his attainder under William III.

Russell did not confess; in fact, he pleaded that he knew of no plot to execute the king and was not party to any conspiracy to do so. He is recorded as having admitted to conspiring to levy a war. Such a mini-invasion ultimately took place and was successful; simply put, Russell did not time his meetings correctly. He resigned himself rapidly to accept his fate with dignity while still stating his innocence, but was disappointed in the justice he had received, as laid out in his last letter before his death. Russell was later pardoned as having committed no part in a directly treasonous plot, casting the evidence as hearsay. The pardon remains an official document.

Whigs later commemorated him as a mistreated martyr, supposedly put to death in retaliation for his efforts to exclude James from succession to the crown.

Several people were tried and convicted of seditious libel for publishing works about his ghost.

== Notes ==
Parliament of England
Vacant Not represented in the Rump Title last held by Henry Hatsell; Edmund Fowell	Member of Parliament for Tavistock; 1660–1661; With: George Howard	Succeeded by George Howard; Sir John Davie
Preceded by George Howard; Sir John Davie	Member of Parliament for Tavistock; 1661–1679; With: George Howard 1661–73; Sir Francis Drake 1673–79	Succeeded by Sir Francis Drake; Edward Russell
Preceded by Sir Humphrey Winch, Bt; Sir John Napier	Member of Parliament for Bedfordshire; 1679–1683; With: Sir Humphrey Monoux, Bt	Succeeded by Sir Humphrey Monoux, Bt
