= Richard Arundell, 1st Baron Arundell of Trerice =

English politician

Richard Arundell, 1st Baron Arundell of Trerice JP
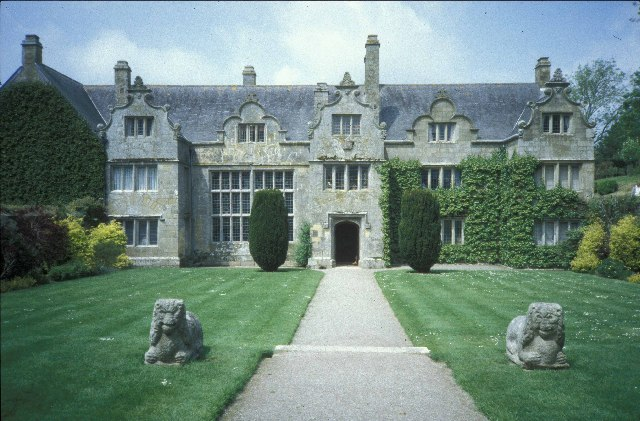
- Trerice House, Cornwall

Governor of Pendennis Castle
- In office 1662–1687

Deputy Lord Lieutenant of Cornwall
- In office 1662–1687

Member of Parliament for Bere Alston
- In office January 1662 – March 1665

Member of Parliament for Lostwithiel
- In office November 1640 – January 1642 (excluded)

Personal details
- Born: c. 1616 Trerice
- Died: 7 September 1687 (aged 71) London
- Resting place: St James's Church, Piccadilly
- Spouse: Gertrude Bagge (1645-his death)
- Children: John Arundell, 2nd Baron Arundell of Trerice
- Education: Lincoln's Inn
- Occupation: Landowner, politician and soldier

Military service
- Years of service: 1642 to 1646
- Rank: Colonel
- Battles/wars: First English Civil War; Edgehill; Lansdowne; Bristol; Siege of Pendennis Castle

Richard Arundell, 1st Baron Arundell of Trerice (c. 1616 – 7 September 1687) of Trerice in Cornwall, was an English politician who sat in the House of Commons at various times between 1640 and 1664 when he was raised to the peerage. He fought in the Royalist army during the First English Civil War.

== Personal details ==
Richard Arundell was born around 1616 in Trerice, Cornwall, second son of Sir John Arundell and his wife, Mary Cary, daughter of George Cary of Clovelley. He was one of six children, the others being John (1613–1644), William (died 1643), Francis, Agnes and Mary (1625–1701). The Arundells of Trerice were a junior branch of a Catholic family spread throughout Cornwall, the wealthiest and most significant being the Arundells of St Mawgan.

His youngest sister Mary married John Trevanion, who was killed at the Storming of Bristol in 1643; she remarried in 1674, this time to his cousin John Arundell of Lanherne.

Arundell married Gertrude Bagge, daughter of Sir James Bagge, of Saltram, Devon, and widow of Sir Nicholas Slanning, also killed at Bristol in 1643, by whom he had one surviving son, John Arundell, 2nd Baron Arundell of Trerice.

== Career ==
Arundell entered Lincoln's Inn in 1633 and qualified as a lawyer in 1640, representing his elder brother in a legal case that same year. In April 1640, he was elected MP for Lostwithiel in the Short Parliament, then re-elected to the Long Parliament in November. He was suspended from Parliament in January 1642 for putting into execution the Commission of array.

When the First English Civil War began in August 1642, Arundell joined the Royalist army and is thought to have served at Edgehill, as well as Lansdowne. Historian and statesman Clarendon describes him as "a stout and diligent officer" although his primary role was raising taxes for the Royalist war effort. He served under his father in the garrison of Pendennis Castle, which sheltered both Charles II of England and Queen Henrietta Maria during the war and was one of the last strongholds to surrender in August 1646.

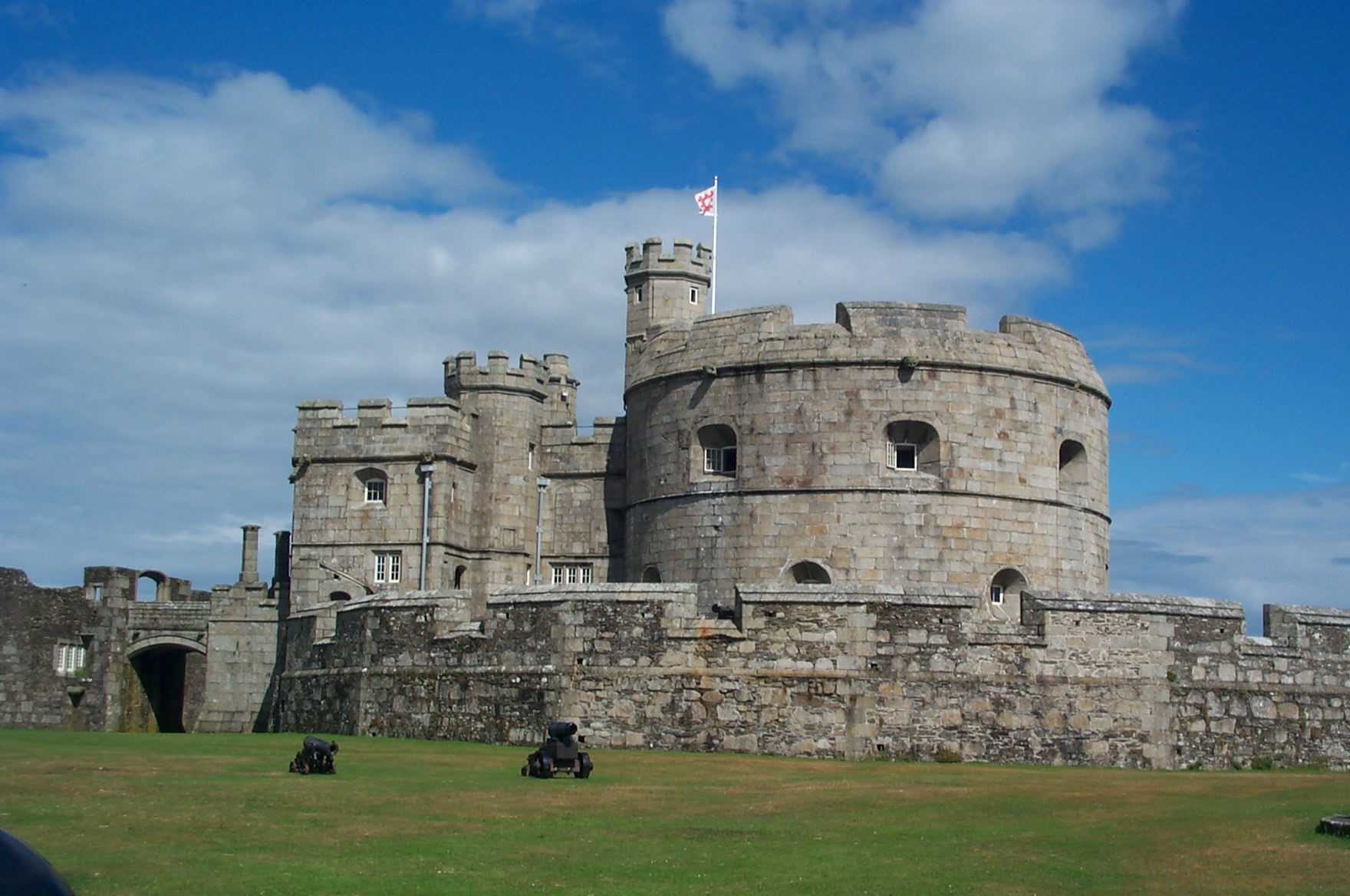
Pendennis Castle, Cornwall

Since his elder brother John was killed outside Plymouth in 1644, Arundell inherited the family estates when his father died in 1654; he remained active in the Royalist underground during the Interregnum but managed to avoid arrest. Shortly after the Stuart Restoration in June 1660, he was elected for Bere Alston to the Convention Parliament. In 1662, Charles appointed him Governor of Pendennis Castle and Deputy Lord Lieutenant of Cornwall, positions he retained until his death in 1687.

In January 1662, Arundell was re-elected for Bere Alston to the Cavalier Parliament and sat until 23 March 1664 when he was created Baron Arundell of Trerice. He became extremely wealthy over the next 20 years, being awarded a free gift of £3,000 in 1674 and a pension of £1,000 per year, considerable sums at the time. He died in London on 7 September 1687.

== Sources ==
- Burke, John (1831). A general and heraldic dictionary of the peerages of England, Ireland, and Scotland, extinct, dormant, and in abeyance. England. Henry Colburn and Richard Bentley.
- Cust, Richard; Hopper, Andrew (eds.). "Arundell v Cosworth in The Court of Chivalry 1634–1640". British History Online.
- Helms, M.W.; Crossette, J.S. (1983). "ARUNDELL, Richard (c.1616–87), of Trerice, Newlyn, Cornw.". In Henning, Basil Duke (ed.). The History of Parliament: the House of Commons 1660–1690 (Online ed.). Boydell & Brewer. ISBN 978-0436192746.
- Vivian, JL (1887). The Visitations of Cornwall comprising the Herald's visitations of 1530, 1573 & 1620 (with additions). William Pollard & Co.
- Wright, Stephen (2004). "Arundel [Arundell], Richard, first Baron Arundell of Trerice (1616–1687)". Oxford Dictionary of National Biography (online ed.). Oxford University Press. doi:10.1093/ref:odnb/724. (Subscription, Wikipedia Library access or UK public library membership required.)

Parliament of England
Vacant Parliament suspended since 1629	Member of Parliament for Lostwithiel; 1640–1644; With: Nicholas Kendall 1640; John Trevanion 1640–1642	Succeeded by John Maynard; Francis Holles
Preceded by John Maynard; George Howard	Member of Parliament for Bere Alston; 1660; With: John Maynard	Succeeded by Sir John Maynard; George Howard
Preceded by Sir John Maynard; George Howard	Member of Parliament for Bere Alston; 1662–1665; With: Sir John Maynard	Succeeded by Sir John Maynard; Joseph Maynard
Peerage of England
New creation	Baron Arundell of Trerice; 1664–1687	Succeeded by John Arundell
