= Joseph Maynard =

English politician

Joseph Maynard (1639 – 25 October 1689) was an English politician who sat in the House of Commons from 1665 to 1679.

== Origins ==
Maynard was the son of Sir John Maynard, MP, by his first wife Elizabeth Henley daughter of Andrew Henley of Taunton, Somerset and was baptised on 15 December 1639.

== Career ==
He was a student of Middle Temple in 1663 but was never called to the bar as he came "much short of his father's intellectual parts". In 1665, he was elected Member of Parliament for Bere Alston in the Cavalier Parliament although through the tardiness of the Sheriff of Devon he did not take his seat until nearly a year later. He was commissioner for recusants for Devon in 1675 and commissioner for assessment for Buckinghamshire from 1679 to 1680. He did not stand for parliament again as his father preferred to nominate more eminent representatives for the family borough.

Maynard lived at Clifton Reynes, Buckinghamshire.

== Marriages and children ==
Maynard married twice:

- Firstly on 25 May 1663 to Mary Mosley, daughter of Sir Edward Mosley, 1st Baronet of Rolleston, Staffordshire. By Mary he had three daughters, two of whom survived and thus became great heiresses:
  - Mary Maynard, who married 2 March 1691, as his second wife, Thomas Grey, 2nd Earl of Stamford. She died without issue, 9 November 1722.
  - Elizabeth Maynard, who married 9 July 1684 Sir Henry Hobart, 4th Baronet (died 1698) and was the mother of Henrietta Hobart, the celebrated Mrs. Howard, afterwards Countess of Suffolk, and of John Hobart, 1st Earl of Buckinghamshire, her only son, created 5 Sept 1746, Earl of Buckinghamshire.
- Secondly by licence dated 5 June 1680, to Elizabeth Strode, a daughter of Sir William Strode (1614–1676), MP, of Newnham, Devon. Without children.

== Death and burial ==
He died in his father's lifetime at the age of about 50 and was buried at Ealing.

Parliament of England
Preceded by Sir John Maynard; Richard Arundell	Member of Parliament for Bere Alston; 1665; With: Sir John Maynard	Succeeded by Sir John Maynard; Sir William Bastard
