= William Jones (law officer) =

English lawyer and politician

Sir William Jones
- Born: 1631; Stowey, Somerset, England
- Died: 2 May 1682 (aged 50–51)
- Occupations: lawyer, politician
- Known for: Solicitor General for England and Wales (1673–1675); Attorney General for England and Wales (1675–1679); MP, Plymouth (1680–1681)
- Notable work: prosecution of victims of Titus Oates's plot (1678); passage of the Exclusion Bill through the Commons
- Spouse: Elizabeth Alleyn
- Children: 2 sons, 2 daughters
- Parents: Richard Jones (MP) (father); Joyce Woodward (mother)

Sir William Jones (1631 – 2 May 1682) was an English lawyer and politician.

== Life ==
Jones was the son of Richard Jones, of Stowey, Somerset, MP for Somerset in 1654, and his wife Joyce Woodward. He entered Gray's Inn on 6 May 1647. He was called to the bar, and acquired a practice in the Court of King's Bench. George Villiers, 2nd Duke of Buckingham befriended him, and he was knighted and made a King's Counsel in 1671. He was generally considered to be a lawyer of considerable learning.

He was Solicitor-General from 11 November 1673 until 25 June 1675, when he was appointed Attorney-General. He directed the prosecution of the victims of Titus Oates's plot in 1678, but resigned from the attorney-generalship in November 1679, saying that he had found the burden of work intolerable. As a man noted for his timid disposition, he was probably not well suited to be a law officer in a time of acute political crisis. He was returned to the House of Commons as member for Plymouth at a by-election on 3 November 1680. He was a manager for the Commons at Lord Stafford's trial (30 November), where he presented the prosecution case with skill, and was heavily involved in the passage of the Exclusion Bill through the Commons: his forceful speeches attracted much attention, and were notable contrast to his normal reputation for timidity.

He was satirised by the court wits, and John Dryden introduced him as 'Bull-faced Jonas' into Absalom and Achitophel (1681). He was re-elected for Plymouth to the abortive parliament summoned to Oxford in March 1681. The King's declaration of 8 April 1681, justifying his dissolution of parliament, was answered by Jones in Just and Modest Vindication of the Proceedings of the last two parliaments (London, 1681, anon.); this tract was reissued in 1689 as The Design of Enslaving England Discovered. After its publication Jones appeared little in public life, owing, it was reported, to his dislike of Shaftesbury. He was on intimate terms with Lord William Russell.

He died on 2 May 1682, "not much lamented", according to his numerous enemies, who included Samuel Pepys. He had married Elizabeth, the daughter of Edmund Alleyn of Hatfield Peverel, Essex and the widow of John Robinson of Denston Hall, Suffolk, with whom he had two sons (one of whom predeceased him) and two daughters. His daughter Elizabeth (died 1681) married as his first wife Thomas Pelham, 1st Baron Pelham. His estate at Ramsbury, Wiltshire was left to his nephew Richard.
