= Norfolk (disambiguation) =

Norfolk is a county in England.

Norfolk may also refer to:

== Places ==
=== Australia ===
- Norfolk Island, an Australian external territory

=== Canada ===
- Norfolk, Alberta
- Norfolk (electoral district), Ontario
- Norfolk County, Ontario

=== Ecuador ===
- Norfolk Island (Galápagos), a former name of Santa Cruz Island

=== New Zealand ===
- Norfolk, New Zealand, a locality in Taranaki

=== United Kingdom ===
- Norfolk (European Parliament constituency)
- Norfolk (UK Parliament constituency), from 1707 to 1832

=== United States ===
- Norfolk, Colorado
- Norfolk, Connecticut
  - Norfolk (CDP), Connecticut, a census-designated place in the town of Norfolk
- Norfolk, Massachusetts
- Norfolk County, Massachusetts
- Norfolk, Mississippi
- Norfolk, Missouri
- Norfolk, Nebraska
- Norfolk (town), New York
  - Norfolk (CDP), New York, a hamlet and census-designated place in the town of Norfolk
- Norfolk, Virginia
- Norfolk County, Virginia, a defunct county of South Hampton Roads, Virginia, USA, created in 1691; location of modern-day Norfolk and Chesapeake

== Transportation ==
- HMS Norfolk, five ships in the British Royal Navy
- Norfolk (ship) - one of several vessels of that name
- Norfolk Air, formerly based on Norfolk Island, Australia
- Norfolk International Airport, Norfolk, Virginia
- Norfolk (MBTA station) in Norfolk, Massachusetts
- Norfolk Southern Railway, an American railroad company
- USS Norfolk, any of several U.S. Navy ships
- Norfolk station (disambiguation), stations of the name

== Animals ==
- Norfolk damselfly, a species particular to the Norfolk Broads in England
- Norfolk hawker, a dragonfly
- Norfolk Trotter, an extinct horse breed named after the county in England
- Norfolk Horn, a rare breed of sheep named after the county in England
- Norfolk Grey, a breed of chicken
- Norfolk Black, a breed of turkey
- Norfolk Terrier, a breed of dog

== People ==
- Any of various Dukes of Norfolk
- Earl of Norfolk, a title which has been created several times in the Peerage of England
- Andrew Norfolk (1965–2025), British investigative reporter
- Lawrence Norfolk (born 1963), British novelist
- Peter Norfolk (born 1960), British wheelchair tennis player

== Other uses ==
- Norfolk Arms, a listed pub in Greater Manchester, England
- Norfolk case, a type of luggage
- Norfolk dialect, a dialect of Norfolk, England
- Norfuk language, spoken in Australia's Norfolk Island
- Norfolk jacket, an item of Victorian-era clothing
- Norfolk Naval Shipyard, in Portsmouth, Virginia
- Norfolk pine, also known as Norfolk Island pine, a species of tree (Araucaria heterophylla)
- Norfolk State University, in Norfolk, Virginia
- Naval Station Norfolk, a major U.S. Navy base in Norfolk, Virginia
- Royal Norfolk Regiment, an infantry regiment of the British Army
- The Battle of Norfolk, a military engagement during the first Gulf War

== See also ==
- Norfolk House
- Norfolk Square
