= Norfolk (ship) =

Many ships have been named Norfolk, including:

- Norfolk (1798 sloop) was built on Norfolk Island in 1798 and was wrecked in 1800.
- Norfolk (1800 ship) was built in France in 1784 under a different name. The British captured her c. 1800 and she made some voyages as a West Indiaman. She also made a cruise as a privateer. Between 1803 and 1808 she served the Royal Navy as an armed defense and hired armed ship on the Leith Station. She spent her time escorting convoys in the North Sea and captured one French privateer. After her naval service, between 1808 and 1814 Norfolk was a London-based transport. From 1814 to 1820 she made four voyages as a whaler in the Southern Whale Fishery. She was last listed in 1823.
- Norfolk (1801 brig) was built in Quebec and registered in London in 1797 as Harbinger. The Colonial government in New South Wales purchased her in 1801 and renamed her Norfolk; she became Australia's first warship. However, she was wrecked at Tahiti in 1802.
- Norfolk (1814 ship) was built at Littlehampton, England in 1814. She was originally a West Indiaman, and then sailed to India and Quebec. She made four voyages transporting convicts from England to Australia, one voyage from Ireland to Australia, and one from Madras and Mauritius to Australia. She was wrecked in 1837.
- PS Norfolk, a paddle steamer launched in 1900

as well as:

- HMS Norfolk, five ships of the British Royal Navy
- USS Norfolk, six ships of the United States Navy

== See also ==
- Norfolk Hero (1799 ship)
- Norfolk Packet (1811 ship)
- USS Norfolk Packet was a schooner purchased by the Union Navy during the American Civil War.
