= List of shipwrecks in August 1863 =

The list of shipwrecks in August 1863 includes ships sunk, foundered, grounded, or otherwise lost during August 1863.

== 1 August ==
List of shipwrecks: 1 August 1863
Ship	State	Description
Georgia	United Kingdom	The steamship ran aground off Nantucket, Massachusetts, United States. She was on a voyage from New York, United States to Liverpool, Lancashire. She was refloated and resumed her voyage.
Jeune Frederick	France	The lugger sank 4 nautical miles (7.4 km) north east of Abrevach, Finistère. Her crew survived. She was on a voyage from Newport, Monmouthshire, United Kingdom to Fontarabia, Spain.
Sea Serpent	United Kingdom	The ship ran aground in the Yangtze.
Storm Cloud	United Kingdom	The ship was driven ashoyre at Akyab, Burma and broke in two. She was on a voyage from Akyab to a European port.
Unnamed	Flag unknown	American Civil War: The ship was sunk off Charleston, South Carolina, Confederate States of America by USS New Ironsides (United States Navy) with the loss of all hands.

== 2 August ==
List of shipwrecks: 2 August 1863
Ship	State	Description
Coriolanus	United Kingdom	The ship sprang a leak and was beached on Langlade Island, where she became a wreck. Her crew were rescued. She was on a voyage from Miramichi, New Brunswick, British North America to Liverpool, Lancashire
Idalia	United Kingdom	The brig was driven ashore on Fårö, Sweden. She was on a voyage from Vyborg, Grand Duchy of Finland to West Hartlepool, County Durham. She was refloated and taken in to "Ekwik" in a waterlogged condition.
Lady Eglington	United Kingdom	The steamship ran aground on the Aceitera Flats, off Cape Trafalgar, Spain. She was refloated and resumed her voyage.
Ocean Mail	United Kingdom	The full-rigged ship was lost 6 nautical miles (11 km) off the mouth of the Woosung River, China with the loss of two of her crew. She was on a voyage from Shanghai, China to London.

== 3 August ==
List of shipwrecks: 3 August 1863
Ship	State	Description
Halcyon	United Kingdom	The smack foundered off Great Cumbrae Island, Argyllshire. Her crew survived. She was on a voyage from Ardrossan, Ayrshire to Newry, County Antrim.
St. Vincent	United Kingdom	The brig was abandoned in the Atlantic Ocean. Her crew were rescued by Hannah Secor (United Kingdom). St. Vincent was on a voyage from Cardiff, Glamorgan to Saint Thomas, Virgin Islands.

== 4 August ==
List of shipwrecks: 4 August 1863
Ship	State	Description
Georgia	United Kingdom	The steamship ran aground and was wrecked at Cape Sable Island, Nova Scotia, British North America. All on board were rescued. She was on a voyage from New York, United States to Liverpool, Lancashire.

== 5 August ==
List of shipwrecks: 5 August 1863
Ship	State	Description
Gulterus	United Kingdom	The brig struck an iceberg in the Atlantic Ocean. She was set afire and abandoned by her crew, who were rescued by the schooner Prince ( (United Kingdom of Great Britain and Ireland) Jersey. Gulterus was on a voyage from Montreal, Province of Canada, British North America to Liverpool.
Ruth	United States	American Civil War: The 702-ton sidewheel paddle steamer was set afire by Confederate agents on the Mississippi River at Lucas Bend, 4 nautical miles (7.4 km) below Norfolk, Missouri. She was engulfed in flames within five minutes and burned for five hours before sinking in 18 feet (5.5 m) of water. Thirty lives were lost. Her wreck was blown up with gunpowder on 19 October.
Union Packet	United Kingdom	The smack was driven ashore on Sheep Island, Pembrokeshire and was abandoned by her crew. She was refloated with assistance from the smack Amity (United Kingdom) and taken in to Milford Haven, Pembrokeshire, where she sank.

== 6 August ==
List of shipwrecks: 6 August 1863
Ship	State	Description
Anglo-Saxon	United Kingdom	The barque was abandoned in the Atlantic Ocean. Her twelve crew were rescued by Reciprocity ( (United Kingdom of Great Britain and Ireland) British North America) Anglo-Saxon was on a voyage from Montreal, Province of Canada, British North America to South Shields, County Durham.
Barclay	United Kingdom	The ship struck a rock off Swinemünde, Prussia and was damaged. She was on a voyage from Swinemünde to London. She consequently put in to Stettin.
Cheshire	United Kingdom	The ship ran aground and was wrecked at Musquash, New Brunswick, British North America. She was on a voyage from New York, United States to Saint John, New Brunswick.
USS Paw Paw	United States Navy	The centerwheel paddle steamer sank within 15 minutes of striking a snag in the Mississippi River near Hardin's Point, Arkansas. She was refloated, repaired, and returned to service.
Storm Cloud	United Kingdom	The ship was lost near Akyab, Burma.
HMS Warspite	Royal Navy	The training ship was run into by Pervenets (Imperial Russian Navy) in the River Thames at Charlton, Kent.

== 7 August ==
List of shipwrecks: 7 August 1863
Ship	State	Description
Elise	Bremen	The brig was wrecked in Table Bay. Her crew were rescued.
Rudolph	Grand Duchy of Oldenburg	The schooner was driven ashore and wrecked at "Dembeck", near Leba, Prussia. Her crew were rescued. She was on a voyage from Saint Petersburg, Russia to Aberdeen, United Kingdom.

== 8 August ==
List of shipwrecks: 8 August 1863
Ship	State	Description
Carleton	United Kingdom	The brig sprang a leak and was beached at Harwich, Essex. She was on a voyage from Seaham, County Durham to London.
Faith	United States	Carrying a cargo of coal intended for United States Navy ships blockading Charleston, South Carolina, Confederate States of America, the barque ran ashore and bilged off Port Royal, South Carolina.
Norfolk Hero	United Kingdom	The ship ran aground on the Hermes Spit in the Gulf of Smyrna. She was on a voyage from Swansea, Glamorgan to Smyrna, Ottoman Empire. She was refloated the next day and taken in to Smyrna.
Petronila	Spanish Navy	The Petronila-class screw frigate was wrecked at the entrance to the harbor at Mariel, Cuba. Her crew survived. She was declared a loss on 21 August 1863. Her guns, machinery, and equipment were salvaged.
Pico	United Kingdom	The ship was wrecked in the Gut of Canso. She was on a voyage from Boston, Massachusetts, United States to Pictou, Nova Scotia, British North America.
Secret	United Kingdom	The ship was damaged by fire at Gothenburg, Sweden. She was repaired and departed on 14 August for Bridgwater, Somerset.

== 9 August ==
List of shipwrecks: 9 August 1863
Ship	State	Description
Cambria	Bremen	The brig struck an iceberg in the Atlantic Ocean. She was abandoned on 12 August and set afire. Her crew were rescued by Lotus (United Kingdom). Cambria was on a voyage from Quebec City, Province of Canada, British North America to the Clyde.
Commodore	United States	The steamer was lost south of Point Judith, Rhode Island.
Gloucestershire	United Kingdom	The full-rigged ship was partly abandoned in the Atlantic Ocean in a waterlogged condition. Twelve of her seventeen crew were taken off by the schooner Electric Spark (United States). Gloucestershire was on a voyage from Saint John, New Brunswick, British North America to London.
Helen Inglis	United Kingdom	The schooner was driven ashore and wrecked near "Lakken", Denmark. She was on a voyage from Grangemouth, Stirlingshire to Danzig.
Santa Claus	Hamburg	The clipper foundered in the Atlantic Ocean. Her crew survived. She was on a voyage from Callao, Peru to Hamburg.

== 10 August ==
List of shipwrecks: 10 August 1863
Ship	State	Description
Jeanette Melanie	Belgium	The brig foundered off Cabo da Roca, Portugal. She was on a voyage from Lisbon, Portugal to Ostend, West Flanders.
Jeune Adele	France	The brig was wrecked on a reef south east of Bermuda. She was on a voyage from Cardiff, Glamorgan, United Kingdom to Saint Thomas, Virgin Islands.
Hoppett	United Kingdom	The barque was run ashore and wrecked at "Ruberg", Denmark. She was on a voyage from Hartlepool, County Durham to Kronstadt, Russia.

== 11 August ==
List of shipwrecks: 11 August 1863
Ship	State	Description
Beatitude	United Kingdom	The ship collided with another vessel in the Noordhollandsch Kanaal. She was on a voyage from Sunderland, County Durham to Amsterdam, North Holland, Netherlands. She was taken in to Amsterdam in a sinking condition. Subsequently placed under repair.
Sea Gull	(United Kingdom of Great Britain and Ireland) New Zealand	The schooner was struck by lightning off the coast of Taranaki, destroying the mainmast and starting a fire. To save the lives of those on board, the skipper deliberately beached the ship near the mouth of Te Hēnui Stream, New Plymouth.
St. Simon	France	The brig was wrecked at Guimbering, Senegal.

== 12 August ==
List of shipwrecks: 12 August 1863
Ship	State	Description
Celt, and Garibaldi	United Kingdom	The smack Garibaldi collided with the paddle steamer Celt and sank in the Clyde at Port Glasgow, Renfrewshire. Her two crew were rescued. Celt ran aground. Her passengers were taken off by another steamshis.
Northern Crown	United Kingdom	The ship foundered. She was on a voyage from the Chincha Islands, Peru to Havre de Grâce, Seine-Inférieure, France.

== 13 August ==
List of shipwrecks: 13 August 1863
Ship	State	Description
Lydia	United Kingdom	The ship was driven ashore at Calais, France. She was on a voyage from Sunderland, County Durham to Calais.
Peccione	France	The ship was wrecked on the La Folle Reef. She was on a voyage from Jacmel, Haiti to Havre de Grâce, Seine-Inférieure.
Triumph	United Kingdom	The ship was driven from her moorings and ran aground at Narva, Russia. She was refloated the next day.

== 14 August ==
List of shipwrecks: 14 August 1863
Ship	State	Description
Aid	United Kingdom	The brig ran aground and sank off Dagerort, Russia. Her crew were rescued. She was on a voyage from Sunderland, County Durham to Kronstadt, Russia.
Eliza	United Kingdom	The brigantine collided with another vessel and was abandoned off the Smalls Lighthouse, Cornwall. Her crew were rescued by the schooner Moses Parry (United Kingdom). Eliza was on a voyage from Cardiff, Glamorgan to Galway.
Tynemouth	United Kingdom	The ship ran aground at South Shields, County Durham. She was on a voyage from Cartagena, Spain to South Shields. She was refloated.

== 15 August ==
List of shipwrecks: 15 August 1863
Ship	State	Description
Bee	United Kingdom	The ship was holed by a groyne and sank at Eastbourne, Sussex. She was on a voyage from Hartlepool, County Durham to Eastbourne. Following temporary repairs, she was taken in to Newhaven, Sussex on 17 August.
Dundee	United Kingdom	The whaler, a steamship, was crushed by ice and sank in Melville Bay. Her crew were rescued.
Her Majesty	United Kingdom	The steamship struck a rock off Bembridge, Isle of Wight. Her passengers were taken off by pilot boats before she sank. She was on a round the island voyage from Ryde. She was refloated on 18 August and towed in to Portsmouth, Hampshire by the tug Echo (United Kingdom) and the steamship Prince Consort (United Kingdom).
Lady Louisa	United Kingdom	The ship was driven ashore between the Hurst Spit and Lymington, Hampshire. She was on a voyage from Waterford to Southampton, Hampshire. She was refloated and completed her voyage.

== 16 August ==
List of shipwrecks: 16 August 1863
Ship	State	Description
Bellona	(United Kingdom of Great Britain and Ireland) British North America	The schooner was driven ashore at Cutler, Maine, United States and was abandoned by her crew. She was on a voyage from Saint John, New Brunswick to New York, United States. She was refloated and taken in to Cutler.
Good Intent	United Kingdom	The galiot foundered off Cap d'Antifer, Seine-Inférieure, France. Her five crew were rescued by the lugger Jeune Albert (France). Good Intent was on a voyage from Pont-Audemer, Eure, France to Sunderland, County Durham.
Joseph and Mary	United Kingdom	The ship ran aground off Flotta, Orkney Islands. She was on a voyage from Liverpool, Lancashire to Lerwick, Shetland Islands.
Pavilion	United States	The whaler, a brig, was crushed by ice in the Hudson Strait. Her fourteen crew survived, but seven of them were lost on 27 August when their boat capsized. Survivors were rescued on 25 September by the barque Ocean Nymph (United Kingdom
Ruby	United Kingdom	The steamship ran aground and broke her back at Burnham-on-Sea, Somerset. She was on a voyage from Burnham-on-Sea to Cardiff, Glamorgan. She was later refloated and taken in to Bristol, Gloucestershire for repairs.
William Bromham	United Kingdom	The barque ran aground and became waterlogged at Aberdovey, Merionethshire. Her crew were rescued; some of them by the Aberdovey Lifeboat. She was on a voyage from Quebec City, Province of Canada, British North America to Aberdovey.

== 17 August ==
List of shipwrecks: 17 August 1863
Ship	State	Description
Britain's Pride	United Kingdom	The ship ran aground on the Joachin Bank. She was refloated and assisted in to Amoy, China. F
USS Crocus	United States Navy	American Civil War, Union blockade: The armed screw steamer was wrecked on Bodie′s Island, North Carolina, British North America.
Gode Haab	Flag unknown	The ship departed from Arkhangelsk, Russia for Bristol, Gloucestershire, United Kingdom. No further trace, presumed foundered with the loss of all hands.
Urania	(United Kingdom of Great Britain and Ireland) British North America	The brig ran aground on the North Reef, off Antigua. She was on a voyage from New York, United States to Antigua. She was refloated.

== 18 August ==
List of shipwrecks: 18 August 1863
Ship	State	Description
Elizabeth	Norway	The ship ran aground on the Cross Sand, in the North Sea off the coast of Norfolk, United Kingdom. She was on a voyage from Newcastle upon Tyne, Northumberland, United Kingdom to Cádiz, Spain. She was refloated and taken in to Great Yarmouth, Norfolk in a leaky condition.
Hebe	United Kingdom	American Civil War, Union blockade: Pursued by the armed screw steamer USS Niphon and the armed sidewheel paddle steamer USS Shokokon (both United States Navy), the screw steamer, carrying a cargo of coffee, clothing, medicine, and provisions, ran aground on Federal Point, north of Fort Fisher, North Carolina and was abandoned by her crew. According to one source, the Shokokon then riddled her with gunfire, igniting a fire that burned her to the waterline. According to another source, six United States Navy warships shelled Hebe′s wreck on 20 August, destroying her machinery and completing her destruction.
Mary Campbell	United Kingdom	The smack struck a sunken rock and foundered in the Sound of Callaway with the loss of two of her crew.
CSS Oconee	Confederate States Navy	The gunboat foundered in bad weather in the North Atlantic Ocean south of St. Catherines Island, Georgia, during a voyage from Savannah, Georgia, to England with a cargo of cotton. Her crew abandoned ship safely, but a Union ship captured 15 of them off the coast of Florida on 20 August.
Ranger	United Kingdom	The barque was driven ashore and wrecked at Kilkee, County Clare. Her crew were rescued. She was on a voyage from Liverpool, Lancashire to Quebec City, Province of Canada, British North America.

== 19 August ==
List of shipwrecks: 19 August 1863
Ship	State	Description
Barracouta	United Kingdom	The barque was wrecked on the coast of Korea. Her crew were rescued on 24 August by the schooner Nelli Merrell (United States). Barracouta was on a voyage from Hakodate, Japan to Shanghai, China.
Clara Ellen	United Kingdom	The ship was driven ashore at Soldier's Point. She was on a voyage from Liverpool, Lancashire to Miramichi, New Brunswick, British North America. She was refloated on 27 August and taken in to Dundalk, County Louth in a severely leaky condition.
Etna	United Kingdom	The barque was driven ashore at Fremantle, Colony of Western Australia. She was later refloated. She arrived at Singapore, Straits Settlements for repairs on 19 October.
Ellen and Sarah	United Kingdom	The Mersey Flat collided with the pilot boat No. 9 (United Kingdom) and sank at Liverpool, Lancashire. She was refloated.
Helen Jane	United Kingdom	The brig was wrecked at Aveiro, Portugal with the loss of one of her seven crew and one reported missing. She was on a voyage from Porto, Portugal to London.
CSS Robert Habersham	Confederate States Navy	The 173- or 200-ton sidewheel transport suffered a boiler explosion on the Savannah River at Savannah, Georgia, that wrecked her, injured at least eight to ten people, and may have killed her entire crew of 25.
Scout	(United Kingdom of Great Britain and Ireland) Jersey	The smack ran aground at Gardenstown, Aberdeenshire. She was refloated.

== 20 August ==
List of shipwrecks: 20 August 1863
Ship	State	Description
Adelicia	United Kingdom	The barque was driven ashore and wrecked at Horsey, Norfolk. Her crew survived. She was on a voyage from London to Sunderland, County Durham.
Bessy Bent	United Kingdom	The ship was driven ashore at Breaksea Point, Glamorgan.
Petit Corporal	France	The brig was driven ashore on Anholt, Denmark.
William S. Bull	United States	The 16-ton screw steamer foundered in Lake Erie about 40 nautical miles (74 kilometres) from Erie, Pennsylvania.

== 21 August ==
List of shipwrecks: 21 August 1863
Ship	State	Description
Anglo Saxon	United States	American Civil War: The 868-ton clipper, bound from Liverpool, Lancashire, United Kingdom, to New York with a cargo of coal, was captured and burned in the Atlantic Ocean near Brest, Finistère, France by the screw sloop-of-war CSS Florida (Confederate States Navy).
Anna Maria	United Kingdom	The brig ran aground on the Newcombe Sands, in the North Sea off the coast of Suffolk. She was refloated and resumed her voyage.
USS Bainbridge	United States Navy	The brig capsized and sank in the North Atlantic Ocean off Cape Hatteras, North Carolina. Only two members of her crew survived the sinking to escape in a boat, but one of them became crazed, jumped overboard, and drowned. South Boston (flag unknown) rescued the only surviving crewman two days later.
Benjamin R. Milan	United States	The full-rigged ship foundered in the Atlantic Ocean. Her crew were rescued by Thebes (United Kingdom). Benjamin R. Milan was on a voyage from New York to Cádiz, Spain.
Champion	United States	American Civil War: The 676-ton sidewheel paddle steamer was burned by Confederate agents on the Mississippi River at Memphis, Tennessee, Confederate States of America with the loss of one life.
Columbia	United Kingdom	The steam dredger sank in the English Channel 3 nautical miles (5.6 km) east of Shoreham-by-Sea, Sussex. Her crew were rescued. She was being towed from Portsmouth, Hampshire to Shoreham-by-Sea.
Edmund Cooper	United Kingdom	The barque struck the pier at Dover, Kent and was beached.
Emanuel	Duchy of Holstein	The ship was run down and sunk in the North Sea by the steamship Chevy Chase (United Kingdom). She was on a voyage from Elbing to Altona.
Lady Fielding	United Kingdom	The schooner was driven ashore on the Isle of Arran. She was on a voyage from Belfast, County Antrim to Ardrossan, Ayrshire.
Mary Ellen	United Kingdom	The schooner ran aground on the Kimmeridge Ledge, in the English Channel off the coast of Dorset. She was on a voyage from Middlesbrough, Yorkshire to Cardiff, Glamorgan. She was refloated with assistance from the Coast Guard.
Mary Reynolds	United Kingdom	The ship ran aground in Castlemaine Bay.
Panuglios	Ottoman Empire	The lighter was run down and sunk near Tulcea by the steamship Taurib (Russia). She was on a voyage from Izmail to Sulina.
Queen Mab	United Kingdom	The ship caught fire at New York and was scuttled on the Jersey Flats. She was on a voyage from Liverpool to New York. She was refloated on 5 December.

== 22 August ==
List of shipwrecks: 22 August 1863
Ship	State	Description
Alexander Cooper	Confederate States of America	American Civil War, Union blockade: The schooner was burned in New Topsail Inlet on the coast of North Carolina by a boat crew from the sidewheel paddle steamer USS Shokokon (United States Navy).
Ashby	United Kingdom	The schooner was wrecked on a reef 6 leagues (18 nautical miles (33 km) south of the mouth of the Rio Grande do Norte. Her crew were rescued. She was on a voyage from Lisbon, Portugal to Rio de Janeiro, Brazil.
Georges Creek	United States	The 448-ton screw steamer foundered in the North Atlantic Ocean off Cape Hatteras, North Carolina.
Unidentified schooner	Confederate States of America	American Civil War, Union blockade: The schooner was burned in New Topsail Inlet by United States Navy sailors.

== 23 August ==
List of shipwrecks: 23 August 1863
Ship	State	Description
Courier	United Kingdom	The schooner collided with the schooner Wirralite (United Kingdom) and sank off Donaghadee, County Down.
Emma	United Kingdom	The ship ran aground on the Holm Sands, in the North Sea off the coast of Norfolk. She was on a voyage from Alexandria, Egypt to Hull, Yorkshire. She was refloated and resumed her voyage.
Miner	(United Kingdom of Great Britain and Ireland) British North America	The ship was wrecked on the south coast of St. Paul Island, Nova Scotia. She was on a voyage from Yarmouth, Nova Scotia to Quebec City, Province of Canada.
Propitious	United Kingdom	The schooner sprang a leak and was beached at Great Yarmouth, Norfolk. She was on a voyage from the River Tyne to Maldon, Essex. She was refloated on 23 August and taken in to Great Yarmouth.

== 24 August ==
List of shipwrecks: 24 August 1863
Ship	State	Description
Coiner	United Kingdom	The schooner collided with the schooner Wirralite and sank off Drogheda, County Louth. Her crew were rescued by Louise (United Kingdom). Coiner was on a voyage from Workington, Cumberland to Belfast, County Antrim.
Ranger	United Kingdom	The smack struck the Willow Rock and sank. Her crew were rescued. She was on a voyage from Plymouth, Devon to Penzance, Cornwall.

== 25 August ==
List of shipwrecks: 25 August 1863
Ship	State	Description
Coquette	United States	American Civil War: The schooner, carrying a cargo of anchor and chain, was captured at the mouth of the Rappahannock River in Virginia, Confederate States of America, by the sidewheel paddle tug USS Satellite (United States Navy), which was under the control of a Confederate States Navy crew that had captured her on 23 August. After stripping Coquette, the Confederates burned her at Port Royal, Virginia.
Golden Rod	United States	American Civil War: During a voyage from Baltimore, Maryland, to Maine with a cargo of coal, the schooner, was captured at the mouth of the Rappahannock River and burned at Urbanna, Virginia, by the sidewheel paddle tug Satellite (Confederate States of America), which was under the control of a Confederate States Navy crew that had captured her on 23 August.
CSS Oconee	Confederate States Navy	The gunboat foundered in bad weather in the Atlantic Ocean during a voyage from Savannah, Georgia, to England with a cargo of cotton. Her crew abandoned ship safely, but Union forces captured 15 of them on 20 August.
William	United Kingdom	The sloop sank off Formby, Lancashire. She was on a voyage from Caernarfon to Liverpool, Lancashire.

== 26 August ==
List of shipwrecks: 26 August 1863
Ship	State	Description
Fortitude	United Kingdom	The brigantine ran aground and sank at Ballyshannon, County Donegal. She was on a voyage from Whitehaven, Cumberland to Ballyshannon.
Margaret and Ann	United Kingdom	The ship ran aground on the Castle Rock. She was on a voyage from Bangor, Caernarfonshire to Kyleakin, Isle of Skye, Outer Hebrides.
Roderick Random	United Kingdom	The ship was wrecked on the Hogsty Reef. She was on a voyage from Milford Haven, Pembrokeshire to Boston, Massachusetts, United States.

== 27 August ==
List of shipwrecks: 27 August 1863
Ship	State	Description
H. L. Hunley	Confederate States Army	The submarine sank off Charleston, South Carolina, during a test run in Charleston Harbor when she dived accidentally with her hatches open. The accident killed five members of her eight-man crew. She was refloated and returned to service.
Iliade	Italy	The brig capsized at Sunderland, County Durham, United Kingdom. She was righted.
Norah	United Kingdom	The brigantine was wrecked off Casablanca, Morocco. Her crew were rescued.
Sarah Jane	United Kingdom	The schooner was abandoned in the Mediterranean Sea off Casablanca, Morocco. She was on a voyage from Casablanca to London.
Seamew	United Kingdom	The ship sprang a leak sank in the Atlantic Ocean (37°16′N 15°40′W). Her thirteen crew were rescued by Albert (France).

== 28 August ==
List of shipwrecks: 28 August 1863
Ship	State	Description
America	United Kingdom	American Civil War, Union blockade: Carrying a cargo of cotton loaded at Corpus Christi, Texas, Confederate States of America, the schooner capsized in the Gulf of Mexico off the coast of Texas while under tow by the barque USS William G. Anderson (United States Navy). William G. Anderson had captured her off Texas on 27 August.
Neptune	United Kingdom	The smack ran aground and was wrecked on the Doggerbank, in the Irish Sea off the coast of County Wexford. She was on a voyage from Newport, Monmouthshire to Cardigan.
Sunbeam	United States	Carrying a cargo of whiskey and US$10,000 in specie, the sidewheel passenger steamer sank during a storm in 132 feet (40 meters) of water in Lake Superior off Keweenaw Point, 2 nautical miles (3.7 kilometres) east of Copper Harbor or Eagle Harbor, Michigan (47°29′00″N 87°47′48″W).

== 29 August ==
List of shipwrecks: 29 August 1863
Ship	State	Description
Ann	United Kingdom	The schooner was driven ashore 3 nautical miles (5.6 km) from Helmsdale, Sutherland. Her crew were rescued. She was on a voyage from Lybster, Caithness to Memel, Prussia. She was refloated and taken in to Helmsdale.
Caspar	United States	The ship foundered at sea. She was on a voyage from Pisagua, Chile to New York.
Emma Gilmore	United Kingdom	The barque was lost off Cape Cod, Massachusetts, United States. She was on a voyage from Ardrossan, Ayrshire to Boston, Massachusetts, United States.
Lotus	United Kingdom	The schooner was driven ashore and wrecked at Bonar Bridge, Sutherland. Her crew were rescued. She was on a voyage from Liverpool, Lancashire to Bonar Bridge.
Neptune	United Kingdom	The smack was wrecked on the Doggerbank, in the Irish Sea off the coast of County Wexford.

== 30 August ==
List of shipwrecks: 30 August 1863
Ship	State	Description
Auckland	(United Kingdom of Great Britain and Ireland) New Zealand	The cutter was wrecked near Godley Head in Lyttelton Harbour. All hands were saved but the ship sank quickly and all cargo and belongings were lost.
Incentive	United Kingdom	The schooner foundered off Looe Island, Cornwall. Her crew were rescued. She was on a voyage from Cardiff, Glamorgan to Gijón, Spain.
Minerva	United Kingdom	The schooner was run down and sunk by the smack Elizabeth (United Kingdom) off Land's End, Cornwall. One of her crew was rescued by the smack, the rest reached land in a boat. She was on a voyage from Cardiff to Plymouth, Devon.

== 31 August ==
List of shipwrecks: 31 August 1863
Ship	State	Description
Cestrian	United Kingdom	The schooner was abandoned off Newhaven, Sussex. Her four crew were rescued by the lifeboat Thomas Chapman ( (United Kingdom of Great Britain and Ireland) Royal National Lifeboat Institution). Cestrian was on a voyage from London to Plymouth, Devon. she subsequently came ashore east of Newhaven.
Coquette	United States	The 50-ton schooner was destroyed by Confederate forces at Port Royal, Virginia. They had captured her at the mouth of the Rappahannock River on the night of 24–25 August.
Hector	United Kingdom	The ship was lost at the mouth of the Sergipe River.
Johanna and Bennich	Stettin	The galiot ran aground on the Shipwash Sand, in the North Sea off the coast of Suffolk, United Kingdom. She was on a voyage from Borga, Grand Duchy of Finland to Bordeaux, Gironde, France. She was refloated and put in to Harwich, Essex, United Kingdom.
Seraphine	United Kingdom	The sloop struck the Longships Rocks, Cornwall. She was assisted in to Plymouth, Devon in a leaky condition.
Windham	United Kingdom	The schooner foundered in the English Channel off Berry Head, Devon. Her crew were rescued. She was on a voyage from London to Bridgwater, Somerset.

== Unknown date ==
List of shipwrecks: Unknown date in August 1863
Ship	State	Description
Delhi	France	The full-rigged ship sprang a leak at Madras, India. She was consequently condemned.
Earl of Auckland	United Kingdom	The steamship sank off Brielle, South Holland, Netherlands.
Enea	Austrian Empire	The barque was lost off Cape St. Vincent, Portugal on 1 August. Her crew were rescued. She was on a voyage from Newcastle upon Tyne, Northumberland, United Kingdom to Trieste.
Emma	Flag unknown	The brig was wrecked 2 nautical miles (3.7 km) north of Cape de Gatt, Spain on or before 8 August. Her crew survived.
Everglade	Confederate States of America	American Civil War: The steamship was sunk off Tybee Island, Georgia by a United States Navy squadron. Twenty-two passengers were taken prisoner. She was on a voyage from Savannah, Georgia to Nassau, Bahamas.
Helena	United Kingdom	The ship was wrecked at "Sokken". She was on a voyage from Grangemouth, Stirlingshire to Kronstadt, Russia.
Idelia	United Kingdom	The ship was driven ashore and wrecked at Elwick, Northumberland. She was on a voyage from Vyborg, Grand Duchy of Finland to Hartlepool, County Durham.
Lucy	United Kingdom	The barque was wrecked in Duncan's Passage before 10 August. She was on a voyage from Calcutta, India to Colombo, Ceylon.
Princess Alexandra	United Kingdom	The ship was abandoned in the North Sea 90 nautical miles (170 km) north east of Flamborough Head, Yorkshire. Her crew were rescued. She was on a voyage from Gävle, Sweden to Hull, Yorkshire.
USS Reliance	United States Navy	American Civil War: Captured by a Confederate States Navy crew on 23 August, the armed screw steamer was destroyed by Confederate forces at Port Royal, Virginia, either on 25 August or between 28 and 31 August to prevent her recapture by cavalry forces under Brigadier General Judson Kilpatrick (United States Army).
Retreat	United Kingdom	The brig was abandoned in the Irish Sea off the coast of Denbighshire. Her crew survived.
Salacia	United Kingdom	The barque was driven ashore in the Mud Islands, Nova Scotia, British North America. She was refloated on 3 August and taken in to Pubnico in a hogged and waterlogged condition.
USS Satellite	United States Navy	American Civil War: Captured by a Confederate States Navy crew on 23 August, the armed sidewheel tug was destroyed by Confederate] forces at Port Royal, either on 25 August or between 28 and 31 August to prevent her recapture by cavalry forces under Brigadier General Judson Kilpatrick (United States Army). The armed steamer USS Commodore Read (United States Navy) detonated 50 pounds (23 kg) of gunpowder in her boiler on 31 May 1864 to prevent her salvage by the Confederates.
Sea Crest	United Kingdom	The barque ran aground off Long Point, British North America. She was on a voyage from St. Stephen, New Brunswick, British North America to Liverpool, Lancashire. She was refloated.
Sharp	Confederate States of America	American Civil War: The steamer was burned and sunk by the Confederates in the Sunflower River in Mississippi to prevent her capture by Union forces.
St. Pierre	France	The ship was driven ashore near Pennington, Hampshire, United Kingdom. She was on a voyage from Rotterdam, South Holland to Nantes, Loire-Inférieure.
Sumter	Confederate States Army	American Civil War: The 212-ton steamer, a transport carrying the 20th South Carolina Regiment, the 23rd South Carolina Regiment, and Captain Matthew's Artillery Company (all Confederate States Army), was shelled by Confederate artillery at Fort Wagner and Battery Gregg on Sullivan's Island, South Carolina that mistook her for a United States Navy monitor in fog and heavy weather while she was entering Charleston Harbor at Charleston, South Carolina, without showing a recognition light on 30 or 31 August. She sank in two hours with the loss of 40 killed, one wounded, and eight missing. More than 600 survivors were rescued by barges and Confederate States Navy gunboats.
Thistle	(United Kingdom of Great Britain and Ireland) New Zealand	The cutter was wrecked on the Kawhia Bar, at the mouth of Kawhia Harbour. All on board were lost.
Two Brothers	United States	American Civil War: Carrying a cargo of anchors and anchor chains to Philadelphia, Pennsylvania, the 49-ton schooner was captured by a Confederate States Navy crew aboard the captured armed tug USS Satellite (Confederate States of America) at the mouth of the Rappahannock River in Virginia Confederate States of America on the night of 24–25 August, then was stripped and burned at Port Royal, Virginia, on either 25 or 31 August.
Veranda	United Kingdom	The ship was sighted in the Øresund whilst on a voyage from Sundsvall, Sweden to Poole, Dorset. No further trace, presumed foundered with the loss of all hands.
Westfield	United Kingdom	The ship was driven ashore at Bootman's Head, British North America. She was on a voyage from "Lepraux" to Liverpool. She was refloated and towed in to West Quoddy, Nova Scotia in a waterlogged condition and placed under repair.
Unidentified schooner	United States	American Civil War: Carrying a cargo of coal, the schooner was sunk by Confederate guerrillas off Urbanna, Virginia, Confederate States of America.
