= Master-at-arms (United States Navy) =

United States Navy Master-at-Arms
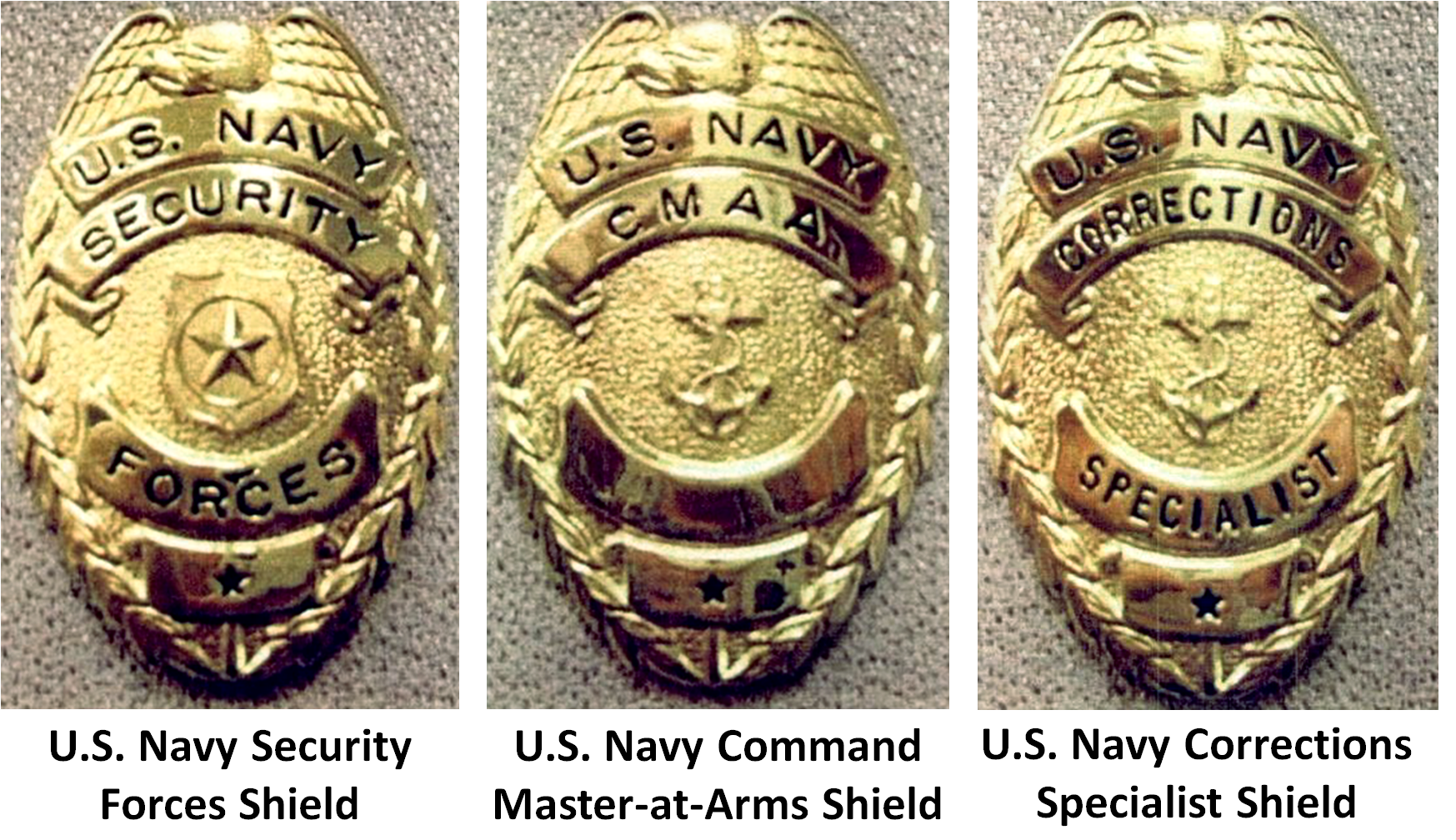
- Master-at-Arms badge
- Active: 1797–1921, 1973–present (1 August official birth date as per BUPERSNOTE 1440 CH-1 of 1973)
- Country: United States
- Branch: United States Navy
- Type: Naval security forces
- Size: 10,000+ Masters-at-Arms
- Part of: U.S. Department of the Navy
- Garrison/HQ: United States Fleet Forces Command, Norfolk, Virginia, U.S.
- Colors: Blue and gold
- Engagements: American Revolutionary War; Barbary War; American Civil War; Spanish–American War; World War I World War II; Vietnam War; Persian Gulf War; Kosovo War; Operation Desert Storm/Operation Desert Shield; Operation Enduring Freedom; Operation Iraqi Freedom; Operation Neptune Spear; Operation Inherent Resolve

Commanders
- Commander, United States Fleet Forces Command: ADM Karl O. Thomas
- Director, Navy Security Forces United States Fleet Forces Command: CDR John Courtial

Master-at-Arms
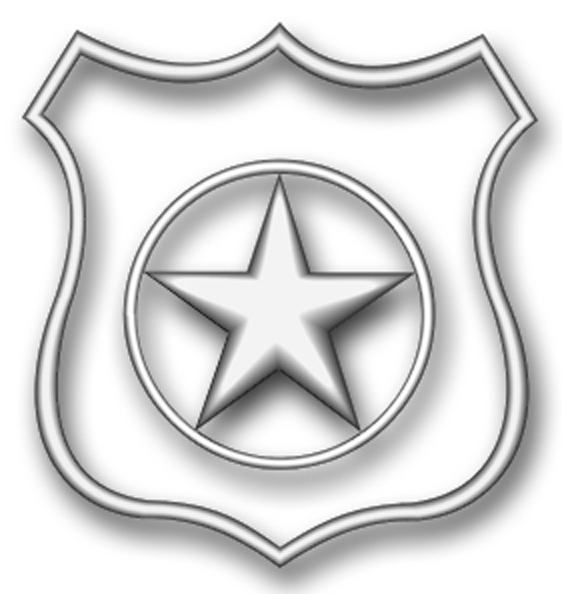
- Rating insignia
- Issued by: United States Navy
- Type: Enlisted rating
- Abbreviation: MA
- Specialty: Force Protection

The Master-at-Arms (MA) rating is responsible for law enforcement and force protection in the United States Navy—equivalent to the United States Army Military Police, the United States Marine Corps Military Police, the United States Air Force Security Forces, and the United States Coast Guard's Maritime Law Enforcement Specialist. It is one of the oldest ratings in the United States Navy, having been recognized since the inception of the U.S. Navy.

It has had two rating badges during its history. Its original MA rating mark was an upright star (two points down) until the rating’s disestablishment in 1921. On 20 May 1958 the upright star reemerged as a nod to the Historical MA Rating whose duty was to provide good order and discipline aboard ships over the enlisted crews. When two senior pay grades were established in 1958, a single (E-8) or double (E-9) upright star (two points down) was placed above the anchor for all collar devices and rating badges.

The MCPON Rating (1971) specialty mark was established using the former MA upright star and later expanded to the Command Rates of Fleet / Command Master Chief (1995) or Senior Chief (2015) Ratings. The current MA rating mark following its reestablishment has been a police badge with internal star (1973–present), emblematic of its police or sheriff duties as a modern law enforcement specialist.

== History ==
The master-at-arms rating is not a modern innovation. Naval records show that these "sheriffs of the sea" were keeping order as early as the reign of Charles I of England. At that time they were charged with keeping the swords, pistols, carbines and muskets in good working order as well as ensuring that the bandoliers were filled with fresh powder before combat. Besides being chiefs of police at sea, the “ship’s corporals”, as they were called in the British Navy, they had to be qualified in close order fighting under arms and able to train seamen in hand-to-hand combat. In the days of sail, the master-at-arms were truly "masters at arms."

=== Early years ===
The navy of the united colonies of the 1775 era offered only a few different jobs above the able seaman level. These included boatswain's mate, quartermaster, gunner's mate, master-at-arms, cook, armorer, ship’s corporal, sailmaker's mate, cooper, coxswain, carpenter's yeoman, and yeoman of the gun room. These were titles of the jobs that individuals were actually performing and thus became the basis for petty officers and ratings. Also, there were ordinary seaman, loblolly boy, and boy, but these are more related to our apprentices of today.

The Master-at-Arms rating officially started after the American Revolutionary War on board the ships of the United States' early navy. Taking on many customs and traditions of the Royal Navy, the existence of the rating did not take effect until the Naval Act of 1 July 1797, was enacted, which called for every ship to have, among other job positions a master-at-arms. Because of this Congressional act, the Master-at-Arms rating is recognized as one of the "oldest" ratings still existing in today's modern U.S. Navy, which includes boatswain's mate, gunner's mate, quartermaster, and yeoman.

From 1885 to 1893, a Master-at-Arms was a petty officer 1st class, who wore a rating badge consisting of three stripes forming an arc over the three chevrons, and a star specialty mark with an eagle perched on the arc. A ship's corporal wore a standard rating badge for a petty officer 2nd class with the star as the specialty mark. The Master-at-Arms rating is formally disestablished in accordance with BNCL 9–21 March 24, 1921, and made effective 1 July 1921.

=== 1940s–1980s ===
Established in 1942, the specialists (s) shore patrol and security, worked shore patrol teams and ensured basic ship and shore station security. Its name was changed in 1948 to shore patrolman, and it took on some of the official functions of the current Master-at-Arms rating, only to be disestablished on 23 January 1953 by the Secretary of the Navy as a result of the RSRB recommendations of June 1952. This was officially implemented by BUPERS Notice 1200 March 5, 1953.

=== Master-at-Arms circa 1970s ===
Official notification from the Chief of Naval Personnel authorizing the creation of the U.S. Navy Master-at-Arms rating

According to the Naval History and Heritage Command, the Master-at-Arms rating was officially established in 1797, disestablished in 1921, only to be re-established by the chief of naval personnel on 1 August 1973 in BUPERSNOTE 1440 Change 1, thereby making that date "1 August" as the official birthday of the modern U.S. Navy Master-at-Arms. This formal creation of the Master-at-Arms rating was the result of a recommendation made by the Special Subcommittee of Congress on Disciplinary Problems in the US Navy, because of riots that occurred on USS Kitty Hawk and USS Constellation in 1972 because of racial tensions. According to the archived reports, the findings of the committee concluded that there was no formal training for the Master-at-Arms force on the ships, the U.S. Marine Detachment was not effectively utilized by the chief master-at-arms of the ships, and that a separate rating be established to perform law enforcement duties similar to the other military services.

After being re-established on 1 August 1973, the rating would only receive sailors who wanted to "cross-rate" (a rating conversion in the U.S. Navy) and submitted a conversion package to BUPERS after concurrence from NCIS. This conversion package was unique in that it required a letter of endorsement from rated master-at-arms in the community who observed the sailor first-hand in the performance of their assigned NSF duties. Along with the pre-requisites required at the time, these sailors must have been frocked as a second class petty officer or above. The conversion process used the procedures and requirements listed in Military Personnel Manual (MILPERSMAN) 1440-010.

In 1982, the Naval Criminal Investigative Service, then known as the Naval Investigative Service (NIS), assumed responsibility for managing the Navy's Law Enforcement and Physical Security Program and the Navy's Information and Personnel Security Program. This effectively made NCIS the program manager for the Master-at-Arms community, responsible for program management, manning, training, and equipping.

=== Post 9/11 and the expeditionary era (2000–2011) ===
The period between the 1980s and the 2000s saw very few changes in the rating after its formation, in terms of tactics, techniques and procedures. Masters-at-Arms were performing law enforcement and ATFP duties. Concurrently, for those naval shore installation with a nuclear weapons mission and a collocated nuclear weapons storage areas (primarily naval submarine bases and select naval air stations, the Marine Corps Security Force assigned to that installation's Marine Barracks, held responsibility for access gates/gate guards, perimeter security, and security of stored nuclear weapons. A similar function was held by the Marine Detachment, essentially a reinforced infantry company, aboard major warships that had both nuclear weapons storage facilities and functioned as flagships (e.g., aircraft carriers and battleships). But the majority of Navy MAAs, especially those assigned to ships, still performed archaic duties such as berthing inspections, restricted barracks supervision, linen issue, and seabag locker management. However, the increased terrorist threat changed the way the Navy thought and operated.

In the mid and late 1980s, the Commandant of the Marine Corps, in agreement with the Chief of Naval Operations, began removing Marine Corps enlisted personnel from gate guard duties at the naval installations they were assigned to in order to place greater emphasis on the nuclear weapons security role, with Navy enlisted personnel assuming gate guard and perimeter security duties. However, most of the junior enlisted personnel assigned to these functions were not part of the MA rating and had little formal training in security duties. With the end of the Cold War, Marine Detachments were also removed from aircraft carriers in the early 1990s, the four Iowa-class battleships having been concurrently decommissioned at the same time.

However, with the USS Cole bombing in 2000, followed by the events of 9/11, the U.S. Navy began to realize its personnel, equipment and infrastructure were grossly under protected because of a lack of specially-trained personnel, especially the Master-at-Arms. As terrorism became a real threat, the Navy's leadership was forced to change how the master-at-arms was viewed, used, and task organized, leading to serious changes in force protection tactics, techniques and procedures. This led to the establishment of the Antiterrorism/Force Protection Warfare Development Center (ATFPWDC), the precursor to the current Center for Security Forces and an increase in Master-at-Arms manning, which in the year 2000 was barely 1,800 to over 11,000 by the year 2007. In addition, in 2003 the Navy Recruiting Command increased recruiting efforts tremendously help fill the billet requirements being demanded by the various type commanders (TYCOM) to combat the terrorist threats within their area of responsibility. This demand increased sharply when the CNO authorized the formation of the Navy Expeditionary Combat Command (NECC), which serves as the single functional command for the Navy's expeditionary forces and as central management for the readiness, resources, manning, training and equipping of those forces.

The biggest change to the rating came after 9/11 in the form of Master-at-Arms sailors being assigned to other military units as an Individual Augmentee in support of combat support and non-combat support roles in the various area of operations of the "Global War on Terrorism". Aside from the authorized billets in unconventional operational units, Master-at-Arms saw Individual Augmentee duties as early 2003 such as in the Iraq AOR with Combined Joint Task Force 7 (the precursor unit of Multi-National Force – Iraq), headquartered at Camp Victory.

In 2006, NECC acquired the program management role from NCIS. The increased need for specialized units such as Maritime Expeditionary Security Force (MESF) and United States Navy Riverine Squadron (RIVRON) units and the manning of several forward deployed locations such as Bahrain saw the need to increase the number of Masters-at-Arms. It was also during this period, for the first and only time, that Master-at-Arms were considered a source rating for U.S. Navy SEAL and were allowed to attend Basic Underwater Demolition/SEAL (BUD/S) training.

Then again in 2011, this changed with U.S. Fleet Forces Command assuming responsibility as the Master-at-Arms community sponsor. This shift is indicative of the "drawdown" the entire U.S. military was seeing from its departure from combat operations in Iraq and Afghanistan. This move marks the change from combat and combat support roles that Masters-at-Arms participated in the various expeditionary and SOF units, and back to more traditional law enforcement roles with U.S. Fleet Forces Command as the community's functional commander. This move still exasperates the existing issue that has plagued the community from its beginning. The issue of the Navy Security Force not having a single chain of command, or type commander, similar to how the U.S. Army, and U.S. Marine Corps Military Police Corps, or U.S. Air Force Security Forces are task organized. In each of the other services, the entire Military Police Corps are under the direction and control of their respective Military Police Provost Marshal General.

=== Current (2011–2014) ===
A proposal from within the community has been recommended, suggesting changes to how the Master-at-Arms rating and Navy Security Force personnel are organized, trai these billets for a duration of six months to a year.

== Duties and functions ==
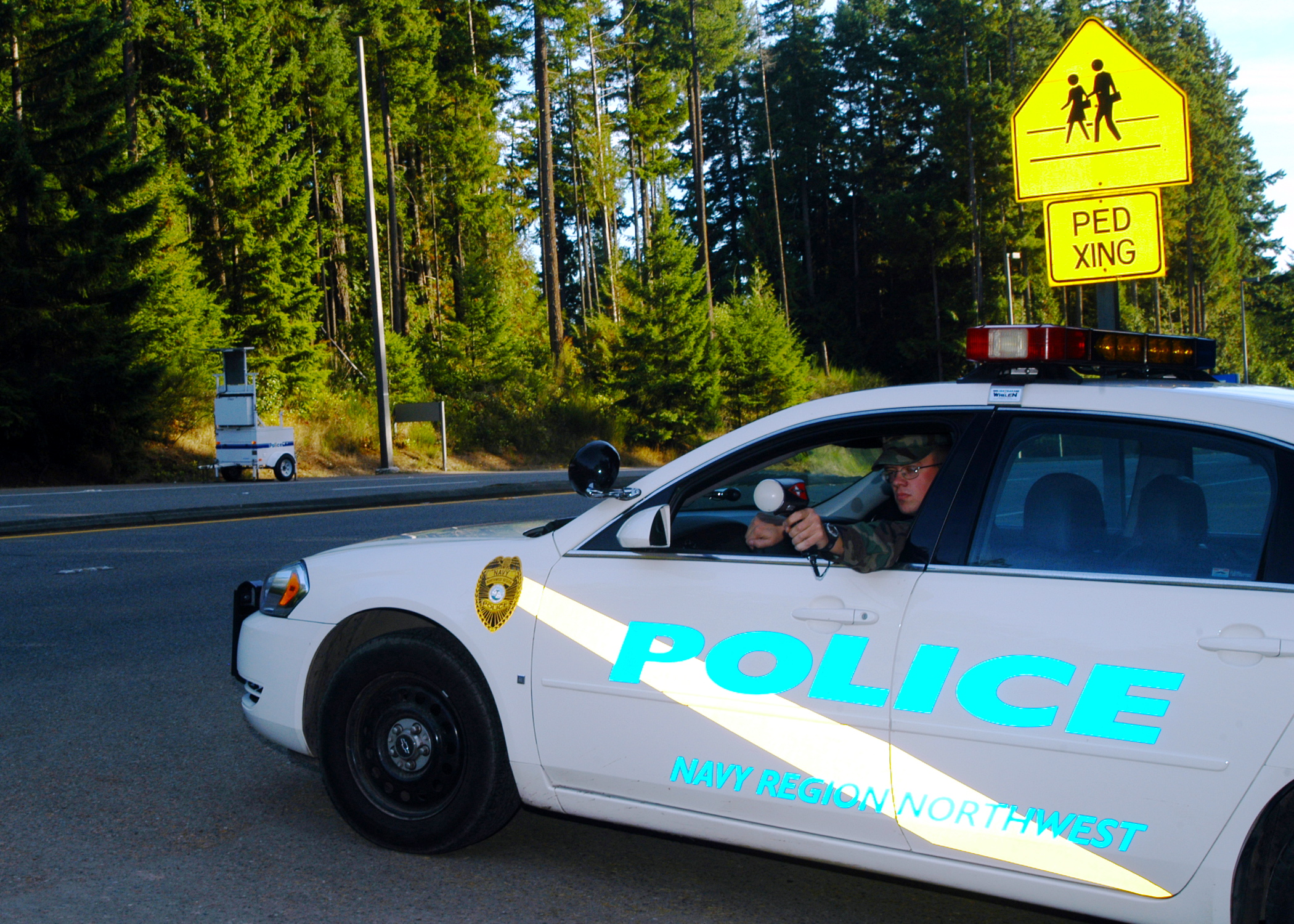
U.S. Navy Master-at-Arms enforcing the installation's speed limit

=== Authority ===
The authority of a Master-at-Arms is derived from many sources. Under Title 10 U.S.C., they enforce the provision of the Uniform Code of Military Justice (UCMJ) (10 U.S.C. § 47). Under the Assimilative Crimes Act (18 U.S.C.§ 13) it provides that local and state criminal codes may be assimilated for enforcement and criminal investigation purposes on military installations. Other sources of authority for masters-at-arms include the Manual for Courts-Martial, United States Navy Regulations, internal directives from the Office of the Secretary of Defense (SECDEF), Office of the Secretary of the Navy (SECNAV), the Office of the Chief of Naval Operations (CNO), and local directives issued by the commanding officer.

=== Mission and duties ===
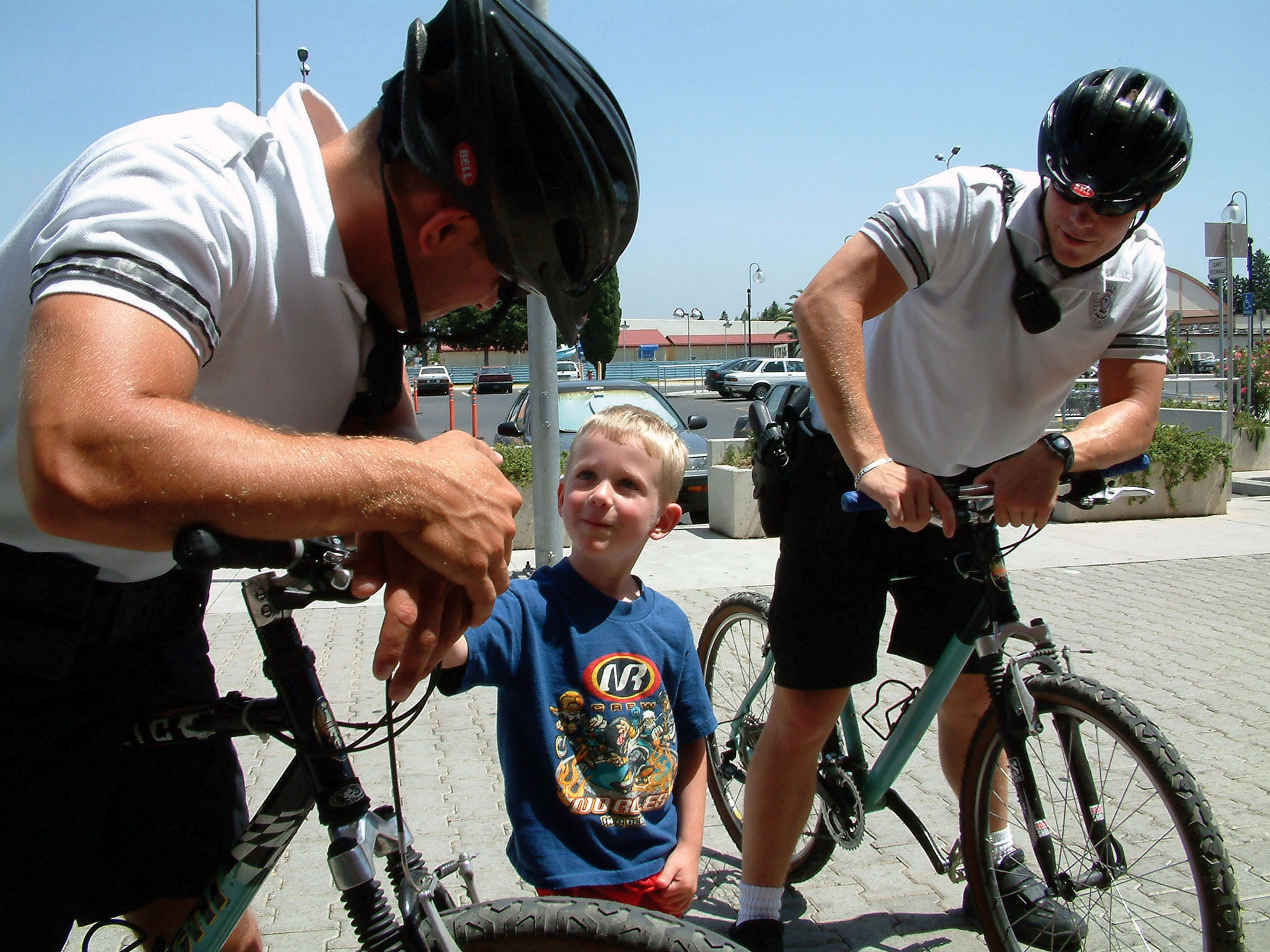
Naval security force sailors assigned to bicycle patrol duties

According to the United States Navy Enlisted Occupational Standards, NAVPERS 18068F, it states that Master-at-Arms provide waterborne and land security, aircraft and flight line security, strategic weapons and cargo security, maritime security and platform protection; conduct customs operations, corrections operations, detainee operations, and protective service operations; perform force protection, physical security and law enforcement; organize and train personnel in force protection, physical security, law enforcement, and weapons proficiency; develop plans for physical security and force protection enhancement of Navy bases, installations, property, and personnel; and assist commands in conducting terrorist threat analysis and implementing defensive measures.

Master-at-Arms perform criminal investigations, with some exceptions. In the Department of the Navy, felony criminal investigations for the U.S. Navy and U.S. Marine Corps are conducted by federal civilian law enforcement agents of the Naval Criminal Investigative Service, which also performs investigations in national security, counter-intelligence, and counter-terrorism. During drug interdiction operations on naval vessels, U.S. Navy personnel are augmented by the U.S. Coast Guard's Law Enforcement Detachment under Title 10, United States Code (U.S.C.) § 279 to perform those law enforcement duties, because of the DOD Regulations and Executive Orders which prevents Navy personnel from being used to enforce state laws. This also limits the ability of enlisted MA personnel from assisting civilian police.

The duties of a Master-at-Arms vary from command to command. Most will primarily perform Antiterrorism (AT), Physical Security (PS), and Law Enforcement (LE) duties, however, other types of duties are open to the rating depending on the command that they are assigned to. This can be in areas such as expeditionary warfare, special operations support, independent duty, GWOT individual augmentee, protective service detail assigned to a high-ranking official, or corrections. Master-at-Arms may also serve outside of the rating, when approved by the community manager, such as in recruiting, recruit training, assignment to NCIS or Afloat Training Group (ATG) as a trainer and evaluator, or to a flag or general officer's Staff.

As the primary law enforcement organization on a naval installation, Master-at-Arms may perform their duties operating a patrol vehicle or Harbor Security Boat (HSB); standing watch (or post) at a gate, pier or flight line as a fixed or roving sentry; conducting traffic enforcement; conducting interviews or interrogations; collecting evidence or securing a crime scene. Like any other law enforcement agency, there are also administrative duties performed by Master-at-Arms such as personnel management, training, inspections, records keeping, etc.

Personnel in the Master-at-Arms rating can also expect to see duties on board a variety of naval warships such as an aircraft carriers' security force department; on a cruiser, destroyer, or aviation squadron as an independent duty Master-at-Arms; on board a naval installation in the United States or in overseas locations such as Bahrain and Diego Garcia, assigned to the security force or police departments; forward deployed to Iraq, Afghanistan or Africa on a GWOT IA assignment; or assigned to an expeditionary or naval special warfare unit. When assigned to these different types of units, Master-at-Ams are expected to achieve the same qualifications and watch stations, as the rest of the sailors assigned to that unit. This may include damage control, maintenance and material management, officer of the deck or petty officer of the watch or small boat coxswain. Overall, these specific qualifications are required of all sailors to complete their unit specific warfare qualifications, for example, enlisted surface warfare specialist or enlisted expeditionary warfare specialist.

== Uniform ==
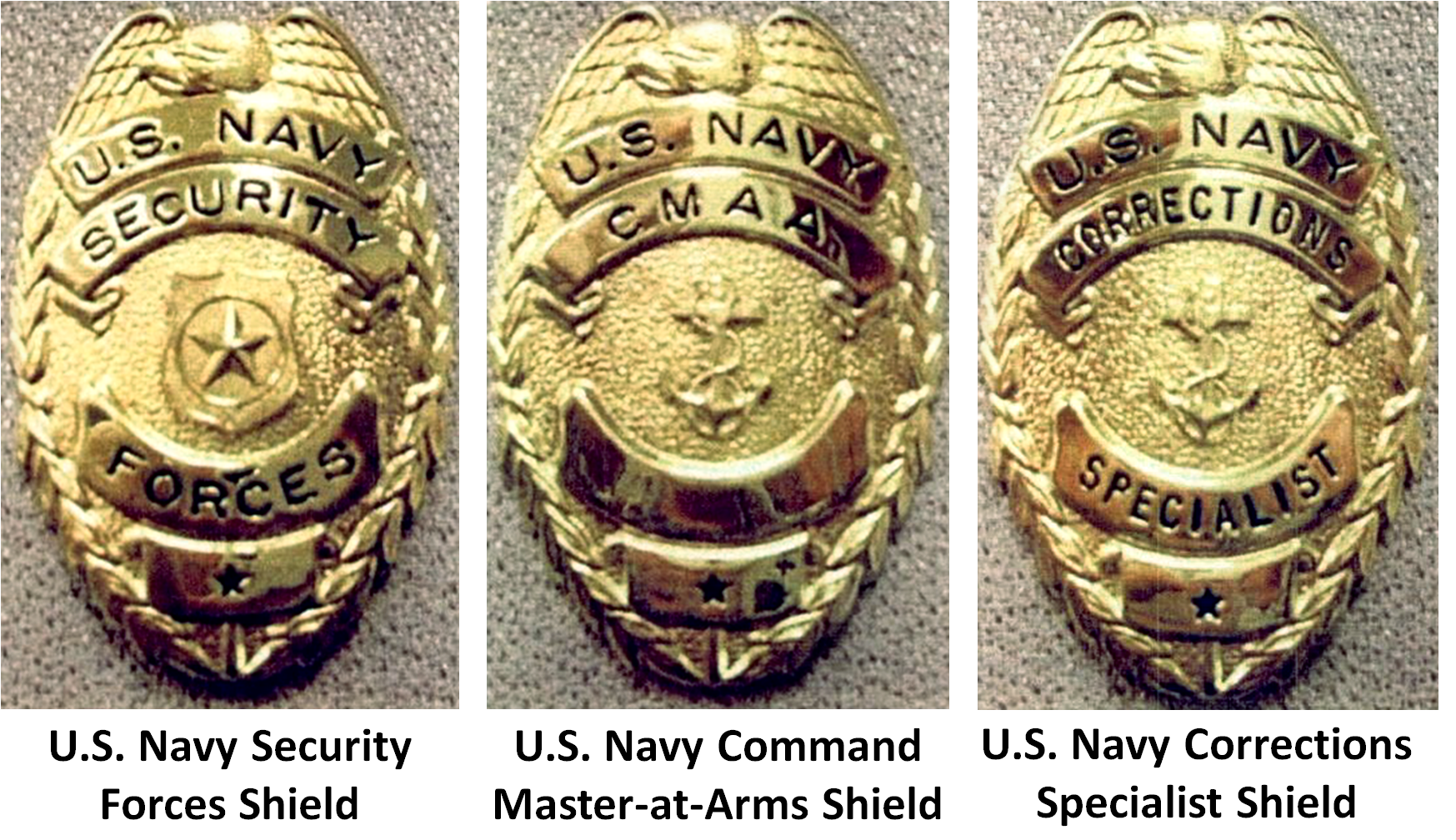
U.S. Navy's current law enforcement metal badge

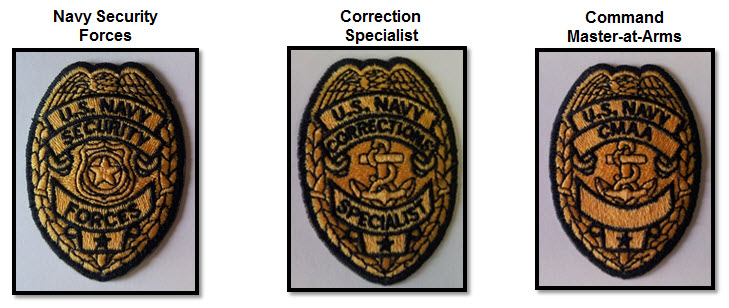
U.S. Navy's current law enforcement patch for the NWU

According to early records, the U.S. Navy took its time about identifying ratings by the symbols so familiar on today's naval uniforms. The Master-at-Arms, or police officer of the ship, wore the white five-pointed star of authority.

Prior to the 1980s, they were only distinguished from other sailors wearing the dungaree uniform, by wearing a brassard on their arm with the letters "MAA". Eventually, commands locally purchased and issued metal badges to Masters-at-Arms, similar to civilian law enforcement agencies. This, however, caused for badge inconsistencies throughout the Navy in terms of the size, color and description, when compared to the uniformity of the other services' military police force.

Between the 1980s and 2010 saw the use of the woodland and desert camouflage utility uniform by Master-at-Arms throughout the Navy, with metal or cloth badges worn on the left breast pocket of the uniform, centered in the middle of the left pocket for men and 1/4-inch above the U.S. Navy tape (or warfare device) for women. The camouflage utility uniform for the Navy was exactly the same uniform worn by the U.S. Air Force and U.S. Army known as the battle dress uniform.

Master-at-Arms wear the same uniform worn throughout the fleet, with a "universal" metal or cloth badge affixed to right side of the uniform, 1/4-inch above the name tape of the sailor, with no difference in position for gender.

=== Rating badge ===
Between 1885 and 1893, the Master-at-Arms was established as a first-class petty officer and wore a distinctive badge consisting of three stripes forming an arc over the three chevrons and specialty mark with an eagle perched on the arc. This would subsequently be used for the newly created rank of chief petty officer. The ship's corporal was then authorized to wear a standard rating badge for petty officer 2nd class with the star as the specialty mark. The current rating badge, as authorized by BuPers Notice 1440 (4 May 1973, effective 1 August 1973) and approved by the Secretary of the Navy on 8 March 1974 has been the current rating badge for the master-at-arms.

== Training and education ==
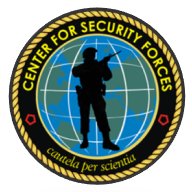
The Center for Security Forces Command logo

In October 2001, the Chief of Naval Operations (CNO) designated the commander in chief, U.S. Atlantic Fleet (CINCLANTFLT) as concurrent commander, U.S. Fleet Forces Command. This action was prompted by the recent terrorists' attacks against the U.S. and the increased awareness among military official that the Navy's force protection posture was in need of revision. Known today as U.S. Fleet Forces Command, its mission is to serve as the executive agent regarding all aspects of force protection for the fleet.

In November 2001, U.S. Fleet Forces Command established the Antiterrorism/Force Protection Warfare Development Center (ATFPWDC) in response to the rapid increase of fleet training needs in the realm of force protection. Known today as Center for Security Forces, its mission is to serve as the training authority for all aspects of force protection for the Navy.

Today, the Center for Security Forces provides specific training, sustainment and serves as the Subject Matter Expert (SME) in the area of Navy antiterrorism, physical security, law enforcement, small arms weapons training, expeditionary warfare, code of conduct, and the Tactics, Techniques and Procedures (TTP) in those respective areas. Its mission is to develop and deliver security force training to achieve war fighting superiority.

=== Minimum Qualifications ===
Below are the minimum requirements or standards, that an individual must be able to possess at application or conversion, and be able to maintain throughout their career as an MA. There would be no moral turpitude waivers granted for alcohol, drugs, indebtedness, or other circumstances, that would result in non-screening for the Personal Reliability Program (PRP), Security Clearance granting or overseas assignment.

- ASVAB test scores of Word Knowledge (WK) + Arithmetic Reasoning (AR) = 95 (with a minimum of 43 in WK).
- Must be a United States citizen and able to obtain a SECRET security clearance.
- No Non-Judicial Punishment (NJP), convictions (civilian or military) within the three years preceding application for MA.
- No domestic violence convictions (non-waiverable).
- Must hold a valid and current state driver's license.
- Excellent command of the English language, verbal and written with no speech impediments.
- Tested negative on a drug-screening test within the previous 30 days, and with no history of drug use for three years prior to application.
- No history of mental impairment or disorder, emotional instability, alcoholism, drug abuse, or any physical condition that impairs the performance of law enforcement and security duties.
- Must have normal color perception, vision correctable to 20/20, and have normal hearing.
- Must be in good physical condition capable of sustained exertion and meet Body Mass Index (BMI) of the U.S. Navy Physical Readiness Program.
- Must be worldwide assignable.
- Must have adequate vision in low light.

=== Master-at-Arms "A" school ===
Master-at-Arms "A" school is located at Lackland AFB, San Antonio, Texas. MAs receive formal and specialized training managed by the staff and personnel assigned to the Center for Security Forces (CENSECFOR). Sailors graduating from "A" School will have the basic knowledge in performing law enforcement duties and will be qualified to operate the M18 pistol, M4 rifle, M500 shotgun, expandable baton, Oleoresin Capsicum (OC) pepper spray, various restraining devices, and operating a patrol vehicle. MAs graduating from "A" School will also possess basic knowledge in interview and interrogation techniques, report writing, use of force and rules of engagement doctrine, and military law.

=== Master-at-Arms "C" schools ===
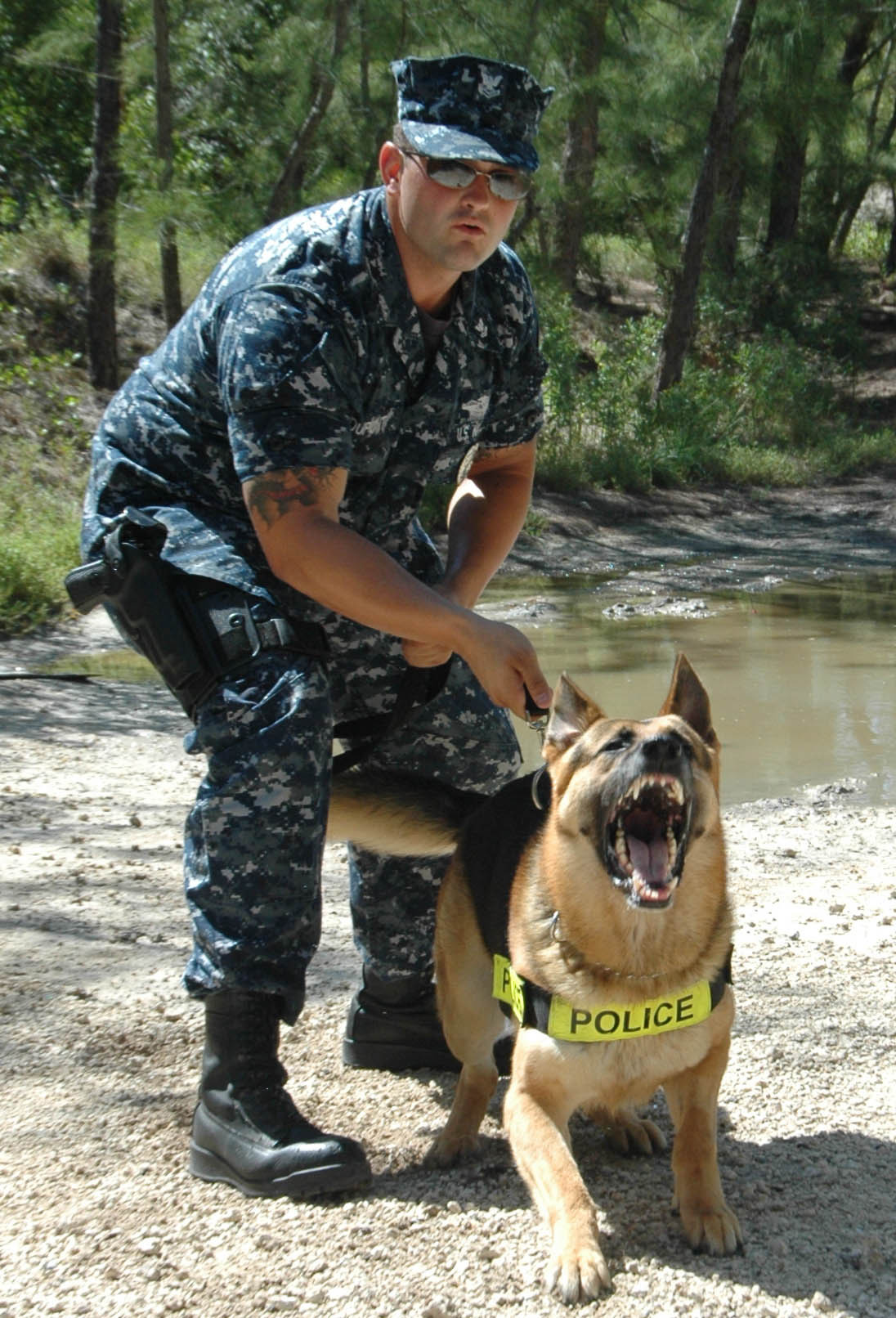
A U.S. Navy Master-at-Arms MWD Handler assigned to Naval Air Station Key West

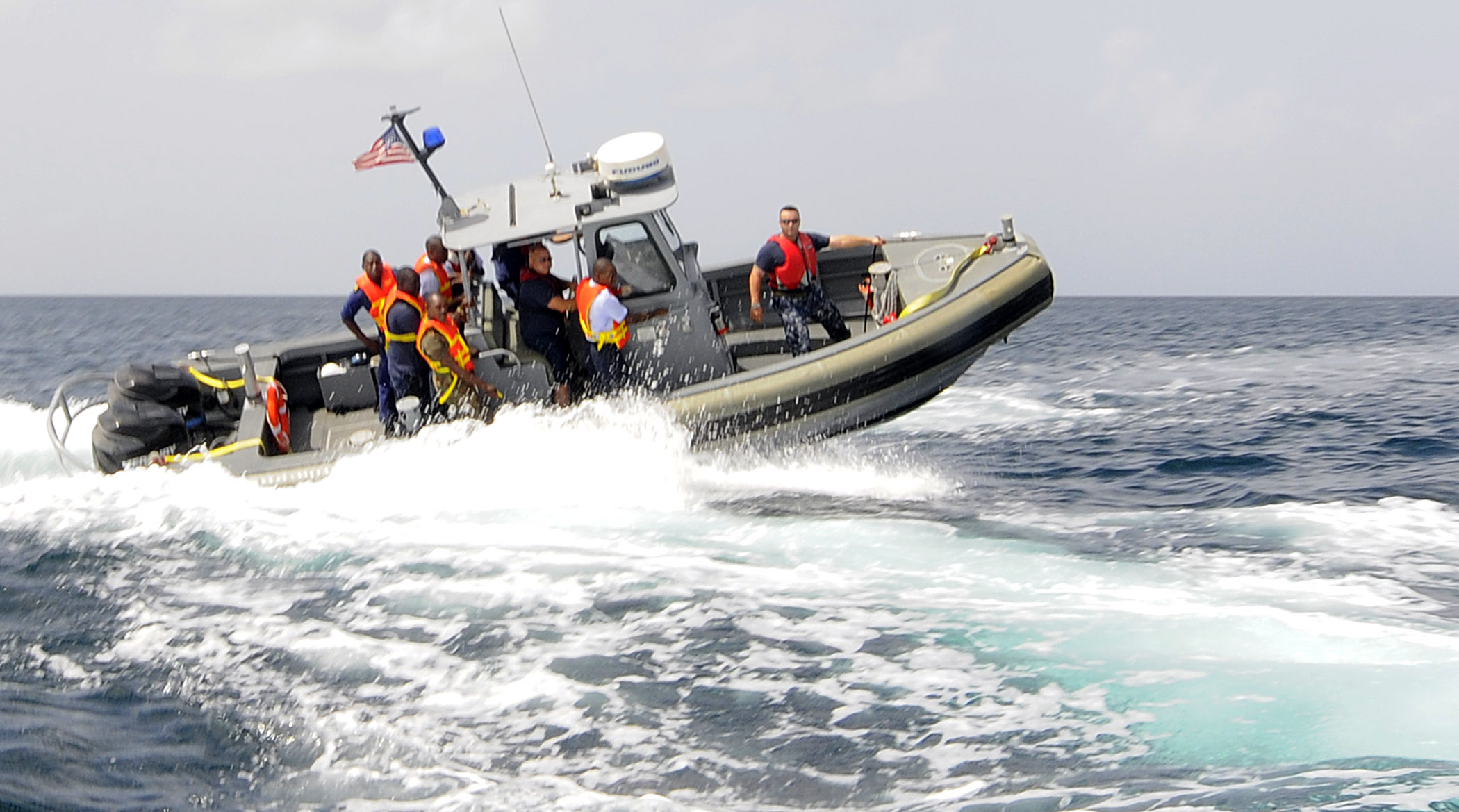
A Chief Master-at-Arms conducting RHIB training

Master-at-Arms perform a variety of duties that require specialized training, or "C" Schools, that are completed immediately after "A" School and throughout their career. Upon completion of the applicable "C" School(s), a Master-at-Arms receives a Navy Enlisted Classification (NEC) Code which is entered into their Electronic Training Jacket (ETJ). NECs are sometimes used in the detailing process for an enlisted Sailor when selecting orders to a new command.

Available NECs:

717B: Small Arms Instructor

718B: Crew Served Weapons Instructor

P01A: Chief Master-at-Arms

P02A: Command Investigator

P03A: Harbor Security Patrol Leader

P04A: Harbor Security Boat Training Supervisor

P05A: Military Working Dog Handler

P06A: Military Working Dog Kennel Master

P08A: Corrections Specialist (Brig Afloat)

P09A: Protective Service Specialist

P10A: Nuclear Weapons Security Specialist (NWSS)

P11A: Physical Security Specialist

P12A: Military Criminal Investigator

804A: Anti-terrorism Training Supervisor

804G: Expeditionary Force Combat Skills

805A: Instructor

853A: Force Protection Boat Coxswain

8MTS: Master Training Specialist

8CFL: Command Fitness Leader

8SEA: Senior Enlisted Academy

== Standard issued weapons ==
Because of the multi-faceted duties of a Master-at-Arms, it is not uncommon for a master-at-arms to qualify in various small-arms and large caliber weapons throughout their career. Additionally, master-at-arms may be required to train and qualify in various non-lethal weapons. Typically, a rated Master-at-Arms will at a minimum maintain qualifications in the following weapons to perform their basic duties:

- Beretta M9 pistol
- SIG Sauer P228 M11 pistol, currently being phased out in favor of the SIG M18 MHS
- Mossberg 500 shotgun
- M16 rifle
- M4 carbine
- M240 machine gun
- M249 light machine gun
- Various non-lethal weapons (NLW) and devices

== Organizational structure ==
In a naval unit task organized with a Naval Security Force (NSF) department or detachment, Masters-at-Arms report to the commanding officer of the command, and are led by a security officer, in maintaining good order and discipline, enforcing rules and regulations, and protecting life and property. Security officers are commissioned naval officers in the limited duty officer or chief warrant officer community with the security occupational designators 649X and 749X. They may also be led by a Department of Defense (DoD) civilian employee who possess the necessary skills, training and/or experience to perform those duties.

Collectively, all personnel responsible for force protection for the U.S. Navy are designated as Navy Security Forces. This includes sailors in the Master-at-Arms rating, commissioned officers in the LDO and CWO field, DoD police officers, contracted guards, and sailors who have completed the required security force training. These "non-rated" sailors are trained by Masters-at-Arms with the Anti-terrorism Training Supervisor skill set (NEC 804A) or by sailors assigned as instructors to the center for security forces learning sites. Some of the course curriculums required to be completed in order to perform NSF duties include Security Reaction Force – Basic (SRF-B) and Security Reaction Force – Advance (SRF-A). Non-rated sailors assigned to perform these duties will be designated as auxiliary security force (ASF) for shore installations, or in-port security force (ISF) for naval vessels.

== Notable Master-at-Arms ==
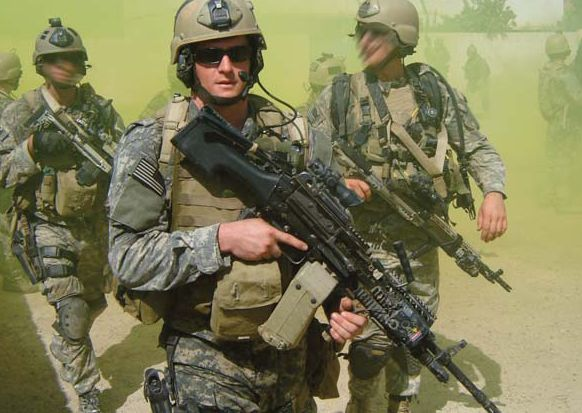
MA2(SEAL) Michael Monsoor while assigned to SEAL Team 3 during OEF (La Squadra Cobra)

=== Medal of Honor Recipients ===
- Master-at-Arms Robert T. Clifford, American Civil War, USS Shokokon, 22 August 1863
- Master-at-Arms William M. Carr, American Civil War, USS Richard, 5 August 1864
- Master-at-Arms James Seanor, American Civil War, USS Chickasaw, 5 August 1864
- Master-at-Arms August Ohmsen, Interim 1871–1898, USS Tallapoosa, 21 August 1884
- Chief Master-at-Arms Daniel Montague, Spanish–American War, USS Merrimac, 2 June 1898
- Chief Master-at-Arms John Stokes, Philippine Insurrection, USS New York, 31 March 1899
- Master-at-Arms 2nd Class Petty Officer (SEAL) Michael A. Monsoor †, Operation Iraqi Freedom, SEAL Team 3, 29 September 2006

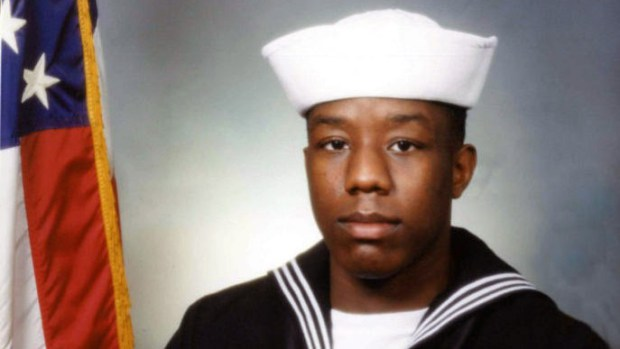
MA2 Mark Mayo, assigned to Naval Station Norfolk Base Police, posthumously awarded the Navy and Marine Corps Medal

=== Navy Cross recipient ===
- Chief Master-at-Arms William A. Kane, World War I, USS WICO, 23 June 1917

=== Silver Star recipients ===
- Master-at-Arms 2nd Class Petty Officer (SEAL) Michael A. Monsoor †, Operation Iraqi Freedom, SEAL Team 3, 9 May 2006
- Senior Chief Master-at-Arms Michael W. Toussaint, Operation Enduring Freedom, United States Naval Special Warfare Development Group, 9 July 2009

=== Navy and Marine Corps Medal recipient ===
- Master-at-Arms 2nd Class Petty Officer Mark Mayo, Naval Station Norfolk, Norfolk, VA, 24 March 2014 (posthumously)
- Master-at-Arms 2nd Class Petty Officer Oscar J Temores, Joint Expeditionary Base–Little Creek, Virginia Beach, VA, 30 November 2019 (posthumously)

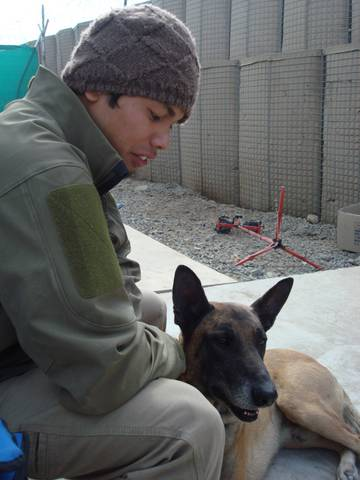
MA1 John Douangdara and his partner Bart while on deployment

=== Bronze Star Medal with "V" device (for heroism) recipients ===
- Master-at-Arms 2nd Class Petty Officer (SEAL) Michael A. Monsoor †, Operation Iraqi Freedom, SEAL Team 3, 29 September 2006
- Master-at-Arms 1st Class Petty Officer (EXW) John Douangdara †, Operation Enduring Freedom, United States Naval Special Warfare Development Group, 6 August 2011

=== Purple Heart recipients ===
- Master-at-Arms 1st Class Petty Officer Michael J. Brodsky †, Operation Enduring Freedom, 21 July 2012
- Master-at-Arms 2nd Class Petty Officer Sean E. Brazas †, Operation Enduring Freedom, 30 May 2012

=== Other notables ===
Master Chief Petty Officer of the Navy (NAC/CAC) John Whittet, USN (1925–1989) – was the 2nd MCPON and after 30 years of Naval service would be one of the first 14 master chief petty officers who converted into the newly created MA rating. MCPON Whittet is a combat veteran of World War II, the Korean War and Vietnam War. He earned his combat aircrewman wings flying 31 missions on board USS Lexington and USS Anzio. MCPON Whittet enlisted in the U.S. Navy as an aviation machinist's mate and served most of his career in that rating until his rate conversion.

== See also ==
General

- Shore patrol
- Military police
- Military law

United States

- United States Navy dog handler hazing scandal
- List of United States federal law enforcement agencies
- Naval Criminal Investigative Service
- Department of the Navy Police
- United States Army Military Police
- United States Air Force Security Forces
- Maritime Law Enforcement Academy
- Joint Maritime Training Center
- U.S. Coast Guard Intelligence
- U.S. Coast Guard Investigative Service (CGIS)
