= John Hobart, 1st Earl of Buckinghamshire =

British politician

The Right Honourable The Earl of Buckinghamshire KB PC
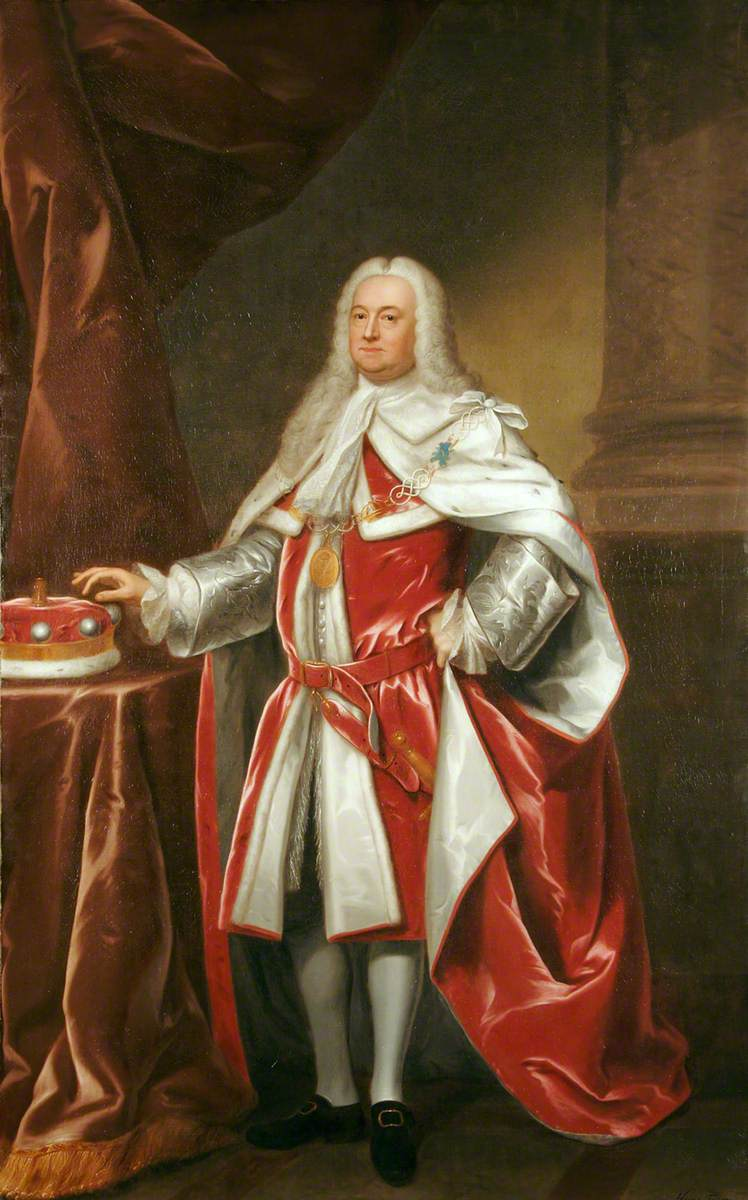
- Portrait by John Theodore Heins, 1743

Treasurer of the Chamber
- In office 1727–1744
- Preceded by: Charles Stanhope
- Succeeded by: Sir John Hynde Cotton

Personal details
- Born: 11 October 1693
- Died: 22 September 1756 (aged 62)
- Parent(s): Sir Henry Hobart, 4th Baronet; Elizabeth Maynard,
- Education: Clare College, Cambridge

John Hobart, 1st Earl of Buckinghamshire, KB, PC (11 October 1693 – 22 September 1756) was a British politician who represented St Ives and Norfolk in the House of Commons of Great Britain from 1715 to 1728, when he was raised to the peerage as Baron Hobart.

== Early life ==
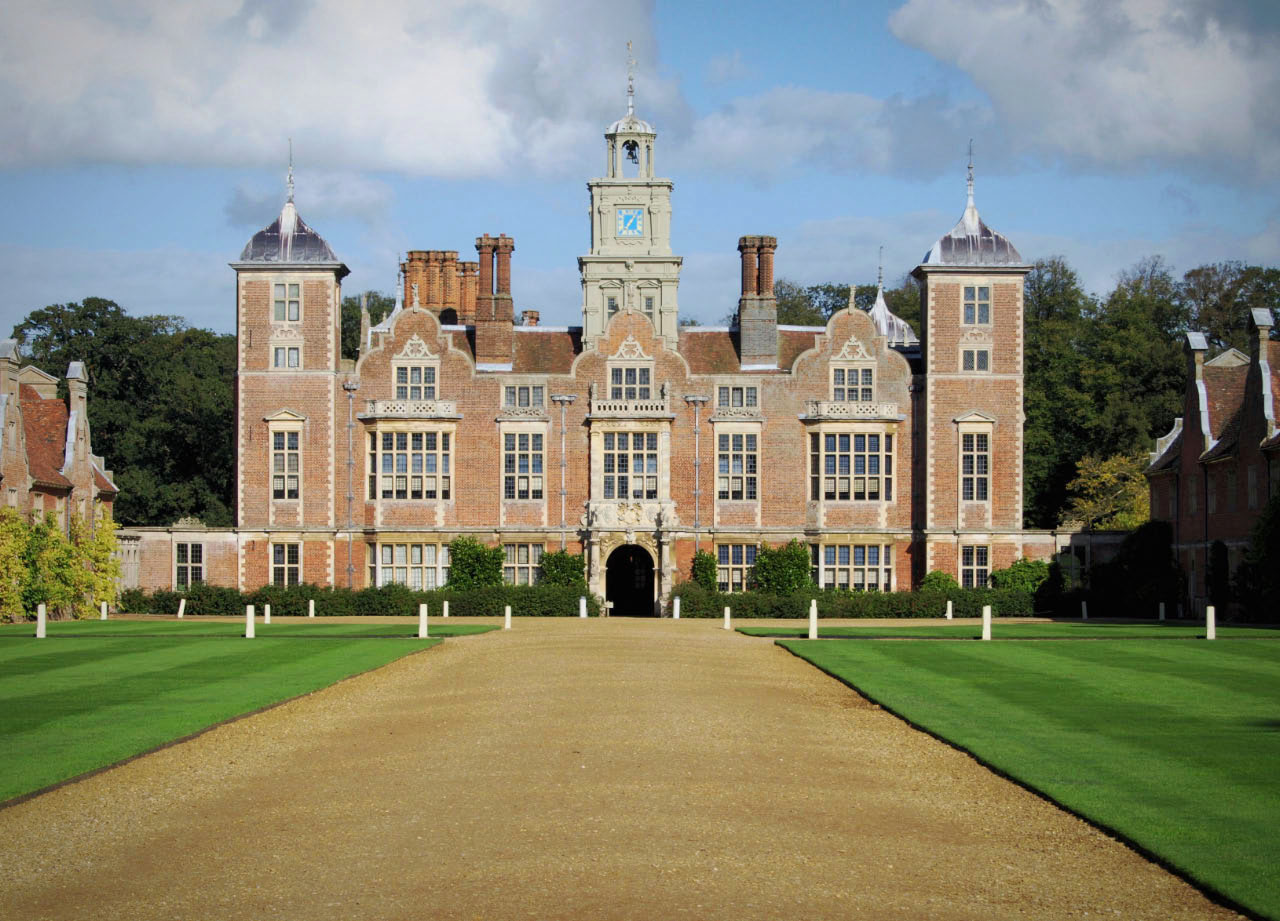
Blickling Hall

Hobart was the son of Sir Henry Hobart, 4th Baronet of Blickling Hall and his wife Elizabeth Maynard, and he inherited his father's title when the latter was killed in a duel in 1698. He was admitted at Clare College, Cambridge in 1710. He married firstly Judith Britiffe (half-sister of Elizabeth, wife of William Morden) in 1717 and secondly Elizabeth Bristow in 1728.

== Career ==
Hobart was returned unopposed as Member of Parliament for St Ives at the 1715 general election. He became Vice-Admiral of Norfolk in 1719, holding the post until his death. In 1721 he became Lord of Trade. He was elected MP for St Ives in a contest in 1722. At the 1727 general election he was returned as MP for Bere Alston and for Norfolk. He chose to sit for Norfolk but vacated his seat in 1728 when he was raised to the peerage as Baron Hobart of Blickling at the coronation of King George II. His sister, the Countess of Suffolk, was a longtime mistress of the King. In 1727, he became Treasurer of the Chamber (until 1744) and assay master of the stannaries (until 1738). He was appointed Lord Lieutenant of Norfolk in 1739, captain of the Gentleman Pensioners in 1744 and Privy Councillor in 1745. In 1746 he was created Earl of Buckinghamshire.

== Death and legacy ==
Hobart died aged 62 on 22 September 1756. He was succeeded by his sons John by his first marriage and then George by his second marriage.

Parliament of Great Britain
Preceded by Sir William Pendarves; John Hopkins	Member of Parliament for St Ives; 1715–1727; With: Lord Harry Powlett 1715–1722; Henry Knollys 1722–1727	Succeeded by Henry Knollys; Sir Robert Rich
Preceded by Thomas de Grey; Sir Thomas Coke	Member of Parliament for Norfolk; 1727–1728	Succeeded by Harbord Harbord; Sir Edmund Bacon
Political offices
Preceded by Charles Stanhope	Treasurer of the Chamber; 1727–1744	Succeeded by Sir John Hynde Cotton
Honorary titles
Preceded by The Earl of Yarmouth	Vice-Admiral of Norfolk; 1719–1756	Succeeded by The Earl of Orford
Preceded by The Viscount Townshend	Lord Lieutenant of Norfolk; 1739–1756	Succeeded by The Earl of Orford
Preceded by The Lord Bathhurst	Captain of the Gentlemen Pensioners; 1744–1756	Succeeded by The Lord Berkeley of Stratton
Peerage of Great Britain
New creation	Earl of Buckinghamshire; 1746–1756	Succeeded by John Hobart
New creation	Baron Hobart; 1728–1756	Succeeded by John Hobart
Baronetage of England
Preceded by Henry Hobart	Baronet (of Intwood); 1698–1756	Succeeded by John Hobart
