= North Norfolk Coast =

North Norfolk Coast may refer to:

- The coast of North Norfolk, England
- North Norfolk Coast Site of Special Scientific Interest
- North Norfolk Coast biosphere reserve
- Norfolk Coast Path

== See also ==
- Norfolk (disambiguation)
