= Waitoriki =

Settlement in Taranaki, New Zealand

- Interactive map of Waitoriki
- Coordinates: 39°8′2″S 174°14′36″E
- Country: New Zealand
- Region: Taranaki Region
- Territorial authority: New Plymouth District
- Ward: Kōhanga Moa General Ward; Te Purutanga Mauri Pūmanawa Māori Ward
- Community: Inglewood Community
- Electorates: Taranaki-King Country; Te Tai Hauāuru (Māori)

Government
  - Territorial Authority: New Plymouth District Council
  - Regional council: Taranaki Regional Council
  - Mayor of New Plymouth: Max Brough
  - Taranaki-King Country MP: Barbara Kuriger
  - Te Tai Hauāuru MP: Debbie Ngarewa-Packer

Waitoriki is a locality in Taranaki, New Zealand. Inglewood is about 4.5 km to the southwest.

== Demographics ==
Everett Park statistical area, which also includes Norfolk, covers 236.32 km^{2} (91.24 sq mi) north, east and south of Inglewood It had an estimated population of 2,420 as of June 2025, with a population density of 10 people per km^{2}.

Historical population
Year	Pop.	±% p.a.
2006	1,848	—
2013	2,043	+1.44%
2018	2,163	+1.15%
2023	2,322	+1.43%
The 2006 population is for a larger area of 236.52 km^{2}. Source:

Everett Park had a population of 2,322 in the 2023 New Zealand census, an increase of 159 people (7.4%) since the 2018 census, and an increase of 279 people (13.7%) since the 2013 census. There were 1,209 males, 1,107 females, and 3 people of other genders in 825 dwellings. 2.3% of people identified as LGBTIQ+. The median age was 38.8 years (compared with 38.1 years nationally). There were 513 people (22.1%) aged under 15 years, 354 (15.2%) aged 15 to 29, 1,155 (49.7%) aged 30 to 64, and 303 (13.0%) aged 65 or older.

People could identify as more than one ethnicity. The results were 93.8% European (Pākehā); 13.8% Māori; 1.2% Pasifika; 1.7% Asian; 0.6% Middle Eastern, Latin American and African New Zealanders (MELAA); and 3.9% other, which includes people giving their ethnicity as "New Zealander". English was spoken by 97.5%, Māori by 1.9%, and other languages by 3.0%. No language could be spoken by 1.9% (e.g. too young to talk). New Zealand Sign Language was known by 0.3%. The percentage of people born overseas was 10.5, compared with 28.8% nationally.

Religious affiliations were 26.5% Christian, 0.1% Islam, 0.5% Māori religious beliefs, 0.3% Buddhist, 0.5% New Age, and 0.6% other religions. People who answered that they had no religion were 62.0%, and 9.6% of people did not answer the census question.

Of those at least 15 years old, 294 (16.3%) people had a bachelor's or higher degree, 1,131 (62.5%) had a post-high school certificate or diploma, and 384 (21.2%) people exclusively held high school qualifications. The median income was $46,300, compared with $41,500 nationally. 219 people (12.1%) earned over $100,000 compared to 12.1% nationally. The employment status of those at least 15 was 1,053 (58.2%) full-time, 336 (18.6%) part-time, and 18 (1.0%) unemployed.

== Education ==
Waitoriki School is a coeducational full primary (years 1–8) school with a roll of 37 students as of July 2025. The school began as the Wortley Road School in 1880.
