= Robert T. Clifford =

Medal of Honor recipient

- Born: c. 1835; Philadelphia, Pennsylvania
- Died: July 24, 1873; Philadelphia, Pennsylvania
- Military career
- Allegiance: United States of America
- Branch: United States Navy
- Rank: Master-at-Arms
- Unit: (Pennsylvania)
- Awards: Medal of Honor

Robert Teleford Clifford (c. 1835 to July 24, 1873) was a Master-at-Arms in the United States Navy who fought in the American Civil War. Clifford received the country's highest award for bravery during combat, the Medal of Honor, for his action aboard the USS Shokokon at New Topsail Inlet near Wilmington, North Carolina on 22 August 1863. He was honored with the award on 31 December 1864.

== Biography ==
Clifford was born in Philadelphia, Pennsylvania, in 1835. He enlisted into the navy and served aboard the USS Shokokon. He died on 24 July 1873.

== Medal of Honor citation ==
Served on board the U.S.S. Shokokon at New Topsail Inlet off Wilmington, North Carolina, 22 August 1863.

== See also ==
- List of American Civil War Medal of Honor recipients: A–F
