= HMS Norfolk =

Five ships of the Royal Navy have been named HMS Norfolk, after the Duke of Norfolk or the county of Norfolk. The Norfolk motto is Serviens servo ("serving, I preserve").

- HMS Norfolk (1693) was an 80-gun third rate launched in 1693. She was rebuilt in 1728, and renamed HMS Princess Amelia in 1755. She was used for harbour service from 1777 and transferred to the Customs service in 1788.
- HMS Norfolk (1757) was a 74-gun third rate launched in 1757 and broken up in 1774.
- HMS Norfolk (78) was a County-class heavy cruiser launched in 1928 and was scrapped in 1950.
- HMS Norfolk (D21) was a County-class destroyer launched in 1967. She was sold to Chile in 1982, and renamed Capitán Prat. She was decommissioned in 2006 and sold for scrap.
- HMS Norfolk (F230) was a Type 23 or 'Duke'-class frigate launched in 1987. She was paid off in 2004 and sold to Chile, being transferred in 2006 as Almirante Cochrane

== Battle Honours ==
Ships named HMS Norfolk have been awarded the following battle honours;

- Velez Malaga 1704
- Cartagena 1741
- Toulon 1744
- Pondicherry 1760
- Manila 1762
- Atlantic 1941
- Bismarck 1941
- Arctic 1941–43
- North Africa 1942
- North Cape 1943
- Norway 1945

== See also ==
- USS Norfolk
- Norfolk (1800 ship) served the Royal Navy as a hired armed defense ship from about 1803 to 1808.
- The hired armed cutter Norfolk served the Royal Navy from 1807 to 1812.
