= Norfolk cases =

Type of luggage

Norfolk cases were luggage made in the 1940s and 1950s for business and domestic applications. They came in a range of sizes from suitcases to a much smaller attaché case. Norfolk cases were made of moulded leather that resulted in cases with no cut or sewn corners.
