= Norfolk station =

Norfolk station may refer to:

- Norfolk station (Amtrak), an Amtrak station in Norfolk, Virginia
- Norfolk station (MBTA), an MBTA station in Norfolk, Massachusetts
- Norfolk Terminal Station, a former train station in Norfolk, Virginia
- Lambert's Point#station, a former train station in Norfolk, Virginia

== See also ==
- Naval Station Norfolk
