= Hired armed cutter Norfolk =

Cutter that served with the Royal Navy from 1807 to 1812

His Majesty's hired armed cutter Norfolk, of eight guns, served the Royal Navy from 1807 to 1812. This Norfolk is not the armed defense ship Norfolk.
