= Norfolk, New Zealand =

Norfolk
- Rural community
- Interactive map of Norfolk
- Coordinates: 39°12′4″S 174°13′45″E
- Country: New Zealand
- Region: Taranaki
- Territorial authority: New Plymouth District
- Ward: Kōhanga Moa General Ward; Te Purutanga Mauri Pūmanawa Māori Ward
- Community: Inglewood Community
- Electorates: Taranaki-King Country; Te Tai Hauāuru (Māori)

Government
  - Territorial Authority: New Plymouth District Council
  - Regional council: Taranaki Regional Council
  - Mayor of New Plymouth: Max Brough
  - New Plymouth MP: David MacLeod
  - Te Tai Hauāuru MP: Debbie Ngarewa-Packer

Area
  - Total: 30.21 km^{2} (11.66 sq mi)

Population (2023 Census)
  - Total: 297
  - Density: 9.83/km^{2} (25.5/sq mi)

Norfolk is a locality in Taranaki, in the North Island of New Zealand. It is located on State Highway 3, about 5.5 kilometres south-east of Inglewood and 10.5 km north-west of Midhirst.

== Demographics ==
Norfolk locality covers 30.21 km^{2} (11.66 sq mi). The locality is part of the Everett Park statistical area.

Historical population
Year	Pop.	±% p.a.
2006	231	—
2013	258	+1.59%
2018	276	+1.36%
2023	297	+1.48%
The 2006 population is for a larger area of 31.90 km^{2}. Source:

Norfolk had a population of 297 in the 2023 New Zealand census, an increase of 21 people (7.6%) since the 2018 census, and an increase of 39 people (15.1%) since the 2013 census. There were 162 males and 135 females in 105 dwellings. 3.0% of people identified as LGBTIQ+. There were 63 people (21.2%) aged under 15 years, 57 (19.2%) aged 15 to 29, 156 (52.5%) aged 30 to 64, and 24 (8.1%) aged 65 or older.

People could identify as more than one ethnicity. The results were 96.0% European (Pākehā), 13.1% Māori, 2.0% Asian, and 2.0% other, which includes people giving their ethnicity as "New Zealander". English was spoken by 98.0%, Māori by 3.0%, and other languages by 3.0%. No language could be spoken by 2.0% (e.g. too young to talk). The percentage of people born overseas was 10.1, compared with 28.8% nationally.

Religious affiliations were 25.3% Christian, and 2.0% Buddhist. People who answered that they had no religion were 64.6%, and 9.1% of people did not answer the census question.

Of those at least 15 years old, 30 (12.8%) people had a bachelor's or higher degree, 165 (70.5%) had a post-high school certificate or diploma, and 33 (14.1%) people exclusively held high school qualifications. 33 people (14.1%) earned over $100,000 compared to 12.1% nationally. The employment status of those at least 15 was 150 (64.1%) full-time and 36 (15.4%) part-time.

== Education ==
Norfolk School is a coeducational full primary (years 1–8) school with a roll of 154 students as of July 2026. The school opened in 1879 and celebrated its 125th jubilee in 2004.
