= USS Norfolk =

USS Norfolk may refer to the following ships of the United States Navy:

- USS Norfolk (1798) was a brig during the Quasi-War with France
- Norfolk (CL-118) was a light cruiser renamed Chattanooga prior to construction
- Norfolk (CA-137) was a heavy cruiser laid down in December 1944 at the Philadelphia Naval Shipyard, but construction was cancelled in August 1945
- USS Norfolk (DL-1) was a destroyer leader/frigate in service from 1953 to 1970
- USS Norfolk (SSN-714) is a Los Angeles-class submarine commissioned in 1983 and decommissioned in 2014.
- USS Norfolk (SSN-815) a planned Virginia-class attack submarine

== See also ==
- HMS Norfolk
