= USS Shokokon =

Warship of the United States Navy

History

United States
- Ordered: as Clifton
- Launched: 1862
- Acquired: 3 April 1863
- Commissioned: 18 May 1863
- Fate: Sold, 25 October 1865

General characteristics
- Displacement: 709 tons
- Length: 181 ft (55 m)
- Beam: 32 ft (9.8 m)
- Draft: 8 ft 6 in (2.59 m)
- Depth of hold: 13 ft (4.0 m)
- Propulsion: steam engine; side wheel-propelled
- Speed: 10 knots (19 km/h; 12 mph)
- Complement: 112
- Armament: two 30-pounder rifles; four 24-pounder guns

USS Shokokon was a large (709-ton) steamer with powerful 30-pounder rifled guns, purchased by the Union Navy during the beginning of the American Civil War.

With a crew of 112 sailors, she was employed by the Union Navy as a heavy gunboat outfitted to pursue blockade runners of the Confederate States of America, and to participate in river operations. When required, towards war's end, she acted as a minesweeper, removing Confederate naval mines from Northern Virginia rivers.

== Service history ==
Shokokon—a wooden-hulled ferry built as Clifton in 1862 at Greenpoint, New York—was purchased by the Navy at New York City on 3 April 1863; altered for naval service there by J. Simonson; and commissioned at the New York Navy Yard on 18 May 1863, Acting Volunteer Lieutenant Samuel Huse in command. The double-ender was assigned to the North Atlantic Blockading Squadron and arrived at Newport News, Virginia, on the morning of 24 May 1863. Shokokon was first stationed in the outer blockade off New Inlet, North Carolina; but, late in June, she was recalled to Hampton Roads, Virginia, and ordered up the York River to the Pamunkey River to threaten Richmond, Virginia, in the hope of diverting Southern reinforcements, munitions, and supplies from General Robert E. Lee's Army of Northern Virginia which had invaded the North and was endangering Washington, D.C. On 4 July, as battered Confederate troops retreated from Gettysburg, Pennsylvania, she ascended the Pamunkey from White House, Virginia, and destroyed an unidentified schooner which had run aground some five miles upstream.

A week later, Shokokon was switched to the James River where, on the 14th, the former ferryboat joined seven other Union fighting ships in capturing Confederate stronghold, Fort Powhatan. The force destroyed two magazines and 20 gun platforms. On 10 August, after repairs at the Norfolk Navy Yard, Shokokon returned to blockade duty off Wilmington, North Carolina, and was stationed off Smith's Island. On the 18th, she assisted USS Niphon in destroying steamer, Hebe, which Niphon had chased aground while that blockade runner was attempting to slip through the Union cordon of warships with drugs and provisions badly needed by the South. Four days later, two boats from Shokokon destroyed schooner, Alexander Cooper, in New Topsail Inlet, North Carolina, and demolished extensive salt works in the vicinity. Late in August 1863, the ship was damaged in a hurricane and sent north for repairs which lasted through the end of the year. She returned to Newport News on the morning of 16 January 1864 and, for the remainder of the war, was active in supporting Union ground forces in the rivers of Virginia and North Carolina.

On 9 March, she joined USS Morse and USS General Putnam in escorting a Union Army expedition up the York and Mattapony rivers; covered the debarkation of troops at Sheppard's Landing; and returned to Yorktown, Virginia, three days later. On 5 May, she was one of the warships which swept the river to clear away Confederate torpedoes (naval mines) and then supported the crossing of the landings at Bermuda Hundred and City Point, Virginia, which established a Union bridgehead on the southern shore of the James. During the ensuing months, she continued to shuttle between the York and James rivers to assist ground operations in General Ulysses S. Grant's ever tightening stranglehold on Richmond. In the autumn, Shokokon returned to North Carolina waters and spent the remainder of the war supporting Army efforts in that theater. When peace finally was restored, the double-ender returned north and was decommissioned at the New York Navy Yard. She was sold at public auction at New York City on 25 October 1865 and redocumented as Lone Star on 15 December 1865. She served for more than two decades before being abandoned in 1886.
