= Hired armed vessels =

Vessels hired by the Royal Navy

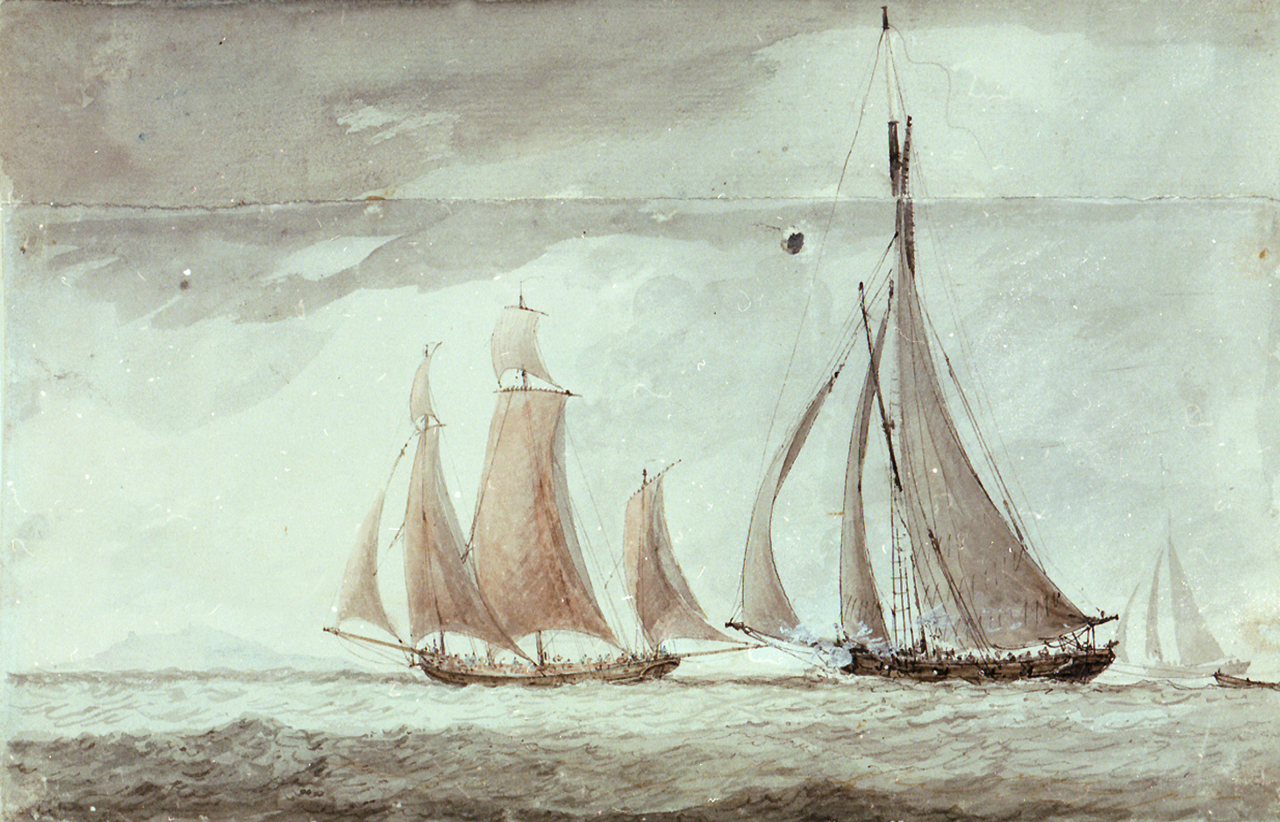
c. 1780 illustration of a hired armed cutter (second from left)

During the 18th and 19th centuries, the Royal Navy made use of a large number of hired armed vessels. These were generally smaller vessels, often cutters and luggers, that the Royal Navy used for duties ranging from carrying despatches and passengers to convoy escort, particularly in British coastal waters, and reconnaissance.

== Doctrine ==
The Navy Board usually hired the vessel complete with master and crew rather than bareboat. Contracts were for a specified time or on an open-ended monthly hire basis. During periods of peace, such as the period between the Treaty of Amiens and the commencement of the Napoleonic Wars, the Admiralty returned the vessels to their owners, only to rehire many on the outbreak of war.

The Admiralty provided a regular naval officer, usually a lieutenant for the small vessels, to be the commander. The civilian master then served as the sailing master. For purposes of prize money or salvage, hired armed vessels received the same treatment as naval vessels.

However, Admiral John Jervis, 1st Earl of St Vincent, wrote that throughout his life he "discouraged any friend of mine from serving in a cutter or hired armed vessel." He felt that a good officer would be wasting his time in such vessels, while a bad officer should not be allowed to serve in them. Cutters and hired armed vessels generally did not receive the sort of opportunities that would allow a good officer to shine, or give him visibility to senior officers, while giving bad officers too much independence. The most suitable officers were good sailors with a common education.

However, some officers who served in hired armed vessels went on to have distinguished subsequent naval careers. A case in point was Thomas Ussher, who rose from the hired armed brig Colpoys to become an admiral.

== Numbers and types ==
In 1801, the Royal Navy had some 130 hired armed vessels on its rolls. Of these, 12 were ship-rigged, 12 were brig-rigged, and most of the rest were cutters. All but eight served in home waters.

Of the 76 vessels in service in November 1804, most were cutters, though six were luggers. The six were:

Name	Burthen (bm)	Crew	Armament	Annual charge
Agnes	63	26	6 × 12-pounder carronades	£2017 12s
Fly by Night	71	24	6 × 12-pounder carronades	£1118 18s 6d
Folkestone	131	43	12 × 12-pounder carronades	£3816 16s
Lucy	119	40	2 × 12-pounder guns + 6 × 12-pounder + 8 × 6-pounder carronades	£3536
Nile	170	50	14 × 12-pounder carronades	£4578
Speculator	93	33	10 × 12-pounder carronades	£3536 8s 9d

During the period roughly 1804 to 1807, the vessels were sometimes referred to as, for example, His Majesty's armed defence ship Indefatigable, which recaptured Melcombe on 21 June 1804, or hired armed defence-ship Norfolk.

== Service records ==
Despite St Vincent's strictures, some of these vessels had military careers as distinguished as those of the Royal Navy's own vessels. For instance, between 1796 and 1801, the hired armed cutter Telemachus captured eight privateers in the Channel. The crew from some vessels qualified for clasps to the Naval General Service Medal (1847). Noteworthy examples include:

- Hired armed brig Ann
- Hired armed cutter Courier
- Hired armed brig Pasley
- HM hired brig Telegraph

In each of these cases, the clasp bore the vessel's own name.

- Hired armed lugger Aristocrat

In this case the crew from Aristocrat shared the medal with two other vessels.

== Letters of marque ==
Some of these hired armed vessels also sailed under a letter of marque, either before (e.g. Duke of York) or after their service with the Royal Navy (e.g., Kitty or London Packet).

== Arming of merchantmen ==
With the resumption of war against France in 1803, the British government spent a great deal of money arming coastal vessels so that they might protect themselves against privateers. These vessels were neither letters of marque, that is, they did not have authorization to seek out and capture enemy vessels, nor were they hired armed vessels working for the Royal Navy. The government simply sought to augment the merchant fleet's defences. For example, in 1807, the Aberdeen Shipping Company had five vessels that had received 18-pounder carronades from the government; the company had also itself armed the London Packet. The Old Ship Company of Leith advertised that its smack Queen Charlotte had been armed by the government.

== See also ==
- Armed boarding steamer
- Ocean boarding vessel

== External source ==
- National Archives: ADM 359/24A/54 - An Account of the Number of Hired Armed Cutters, Ships, Vessels and Boats employed in the Public Service on the 31st December 1793, 1794,1795, 1796, 1797, 1798, 1799, 1800, 30th September 1801, 31st December 1802, 1803 and 15th March 1804, with headings for vessels' names, the nature and force of guns and men, the time employed and when paid off.
