= Norfolk, Missouri =

Extinct hamlet in Missouri, U.S.

Coordinates: 36.929498°N 89.117291°W

Norfolk is an extinct town in Mississippi County, in the U.S. state of Missouri.

Norfolk was platted in 1836, and most likely named after Norfolk, Virginia. A post office called Norfolk was established in 1849, and remained in operation until 1855.
