= Fuller-Eliott-Drake baronets =

Extinct baronetcy in the Baronetage of the United Kingdom

The Fuller-Eliott-Drake Baronetcy, of Nutwell Court, Buckland Abbey, or Monachorum, Sherford, and Yarcombe in the County of Devon, was a title in the Baronetage of the United Kingdom. It was created on 22 August 1821 for the soldier Thomas Fuller-Eliott-Drake, with remainder in default of male issue of his own to his next two younger brothers, William Stephen Fuller and Rose Henry Fuller, and their male issue. Born Thomas Fuller, he was a grandson of George Augustus Eliott, 1st Baron Heathfield (the "hero of Gibraltar"), and grand-nephew of the last Drake Baronet of Buckland (descendant of Sir Francis Drake), and adopted the additional surnames of Eliott and Drake upon his inheritance of Buckland Abbey and Nutwell Court from the second Lord Heathfield in 1813. He was succeeded

The Drake-Briscoe arms quartering Drake

according to the special remainder by his nephew, the second Baronet, a son of the younger of his two brothers, who had also adopted the additional surnames. The title became extinct upon his death without a male heir in 1916.

The second Baronet's only child married the third Baron Seaton, who also adopted the Eliott and Drake surnames and arms by Royal Licence. Similarly, Sir Francis Fuller-Eliott-Drake's great-nephew by his older sister Jane adopted the name of Drake.

== Fuller-Eliott-Drake baronets, of Nutwell Court and Yarcombe (1821) ==
- Sir Thomas Trayton Fuller-Eliott-Drake, 1st Baronet (1785–1870)
- Sir Francis George Augustus Fuller-Eliott-Drake, 2nd Baronet (1837–1916)

Coat of arms of Fuller-Eliott-Drake of Nutwell Court and Yarcombe
Notes Per the Baronetages, the Poë crest was seemingly dropped. Crest 1st, on a terrestrial globe a ship Proper, trained about the said globe with hawsers by a hand issuing out of clouds on the dexter, all Proper (Drake); 2nd, a dexter hand in armour couped above the wrist, grasping a scimitar all Proper, the wrist charged with a key Sable (Elliot); 3rd, out of a ducal coronet Gules a lion's head Argent. Escutcheon Quarterly, 1st and 4th: Sable, a fesse wavy between two estoiles Argent (Drake); 2nd: Gules, on a bend Or a baton Azure, on a chief the arms of Gibraltar, viz., Azure, between two pillars a castle Argent, from the gate a golden key pendent, sub-inscribed 'Plus ultra' (Elliot); 3rd: Argent, three barrulets and a canton Gules (Fuller). Motto Sic parvis magna (Thus great things arise from small). Over the 1st crest: Auxilio Divino (Divine help); over the 2nd crest: Per Ardua (Through difficulties); over the 3rd crest: Fortiter et recte (Bravely and rightly)

== See also ==
- Baron Heathfield
- Drake baronets
- Baron Seaton
- Fuller baronets

Baronetage of the United Kingdom
Preceded by Townsend-Farquhar baronets	Fuller-Eliott-Drake baronets of Nutwell Court and Yarcombe; 22 August 1821	Succeeded by Eardley-Wilmot baronets
