= Crapstone =

Village in Devon, England

Coordinates: 50.4905°N 4.11199°W

- Village
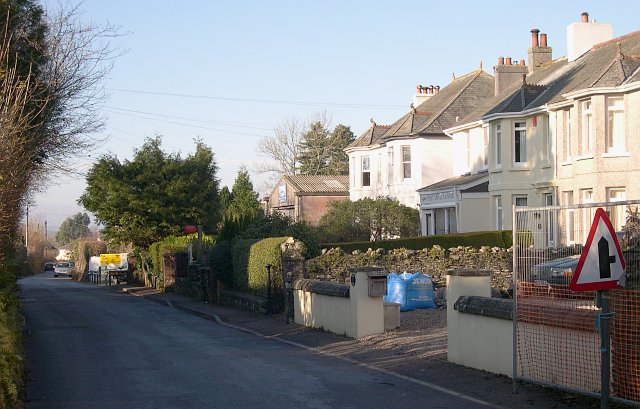
- Village street
- Interactive map of Crapstone
- Country: United Kingdom
- Region: South West England
- County: Devon
- Postcode District: PL20

Crapstone is a village in the county of Devon. The village is located on the edge of Dartmoor, in the parish of Buckland Monachorum and is approximately 1 mile (1.6 km) from the village of Yelverton, 9 miles (14 km) from the city of Plymouth and 5 miles (8 km) from Tavistock.

== History ==
During the Second World War, Crapstone was the nearest village to RAF Harrowbeer. Members of the RAF crew were housed in the nearby villages of Crapstone, Yelverton and Buckland Monachorum. The Ministry of Defence maintained a defence site in Crapstone until the 1980s when the site was cleared and converted for residential use.

In 2007 Crapstone was used as the name of the village in a television advert for the RAC. Local residents started a protest group on the social networking site Facebook complaining that the village used in the television advert was not actually Crapstone but a location using its name.

As a child, Christopher Hitchens lived for some years in the village, and noted his embarrassment at the name in his autobiography, as well as in the pages of Vanity Fair. It has frequently been noted on lists of unusual place names. Other previous residents include singer Michael Ball, Michael Foot (MP), Seth Lakeman, Sam Lakeman, Sean Lakeman, and the writer Emma Smith.

Nearby villages include:

- Yelverton, Devon
- Milton Combe, Devon
- Buckland Monachorum
