= Thomas Fuller-Eliott-Drake =

British Army officer

Sir Thomas Trayton Fuller-Eliott-Drake, 1st Baronet
- Born: 1785
- Died: 1870 (aged 84–85)
- Relatives: Nephew: Francis George Augustus Fuller
- Military career
- Allegiance: United Kingdom
- Branch: (United Kingdom) British Army
- Service years: 1804–1812
- Unit: 52nd (Oxfordshire) Regiment of Foot
- Conflicts: Napoleonic Wars; 1808 Expedition to Sweden; Walcheren Campaign; Peninsular War; Battle of Corunna; Battle of Sabugal; Battle of Fuentes d'Onor; Battle of Ciudad Rodrigo; Battle of San Munos
- Awards: Military General Service Medal with two clasps
- Other work: Sheriff of Devon (1822)

Sir Thomas Trayton Fuller-Eliott-Drake, 1st Baronet (1785–1870) was a British Army officer.

The Fuller-Eliott-Drake Baronetcy, of Nutwell Court, Devon, was created in the Baronetage of the United Kingdom on 22 August 1821 for Thomas Fuller-Eliott-Drake, grandson of the first Lord Heathfield, and grand-nephew of the last Drake baronet of Buckland. Originally surnamed simply Fuller, the first baronet had adopted the additional surnames Eliott and Drake upon his inheritance of Buckland Abbey and Nutwell Court from the second Lord Heathfield in 1813. He was succeeded by his nephew Francis George Augustus Fuller.

Fuller-Elliot-Drake was an officer in the 52nd (Oxfordshire) Regiment of Foot, joining in 1804, and serving under Sir John Moore during the 1808 expedition to Sweden, and in the Battle of Corunna. Serving in the Walcheren Expedition in 1809, Fuller-Elliot-Drake returned to the Peninsula, where he was present at the Battles of Sabugal, Fuentes d'Onor, Ciudad Rodrigo, and San Munos, where he was severely wounded. He left the Peninsula in 1812.

Fuller-Elliot-Drake was awarded the Military General Service Medal with two clasps.

He was appointed Sheriff of Devon in 1822. From 1838 to 1843 he had a London home at 4 Upper Brook Street, Mayfair.

== Notes ==
- The Peerage

Baronetage of the United Kingdom
New title	Baronet (of Nutwell Court); 1821–1870	Succeeded by Francis George Augustus Fuller
