= Sir John Drake, 1st Baronet =

English politician

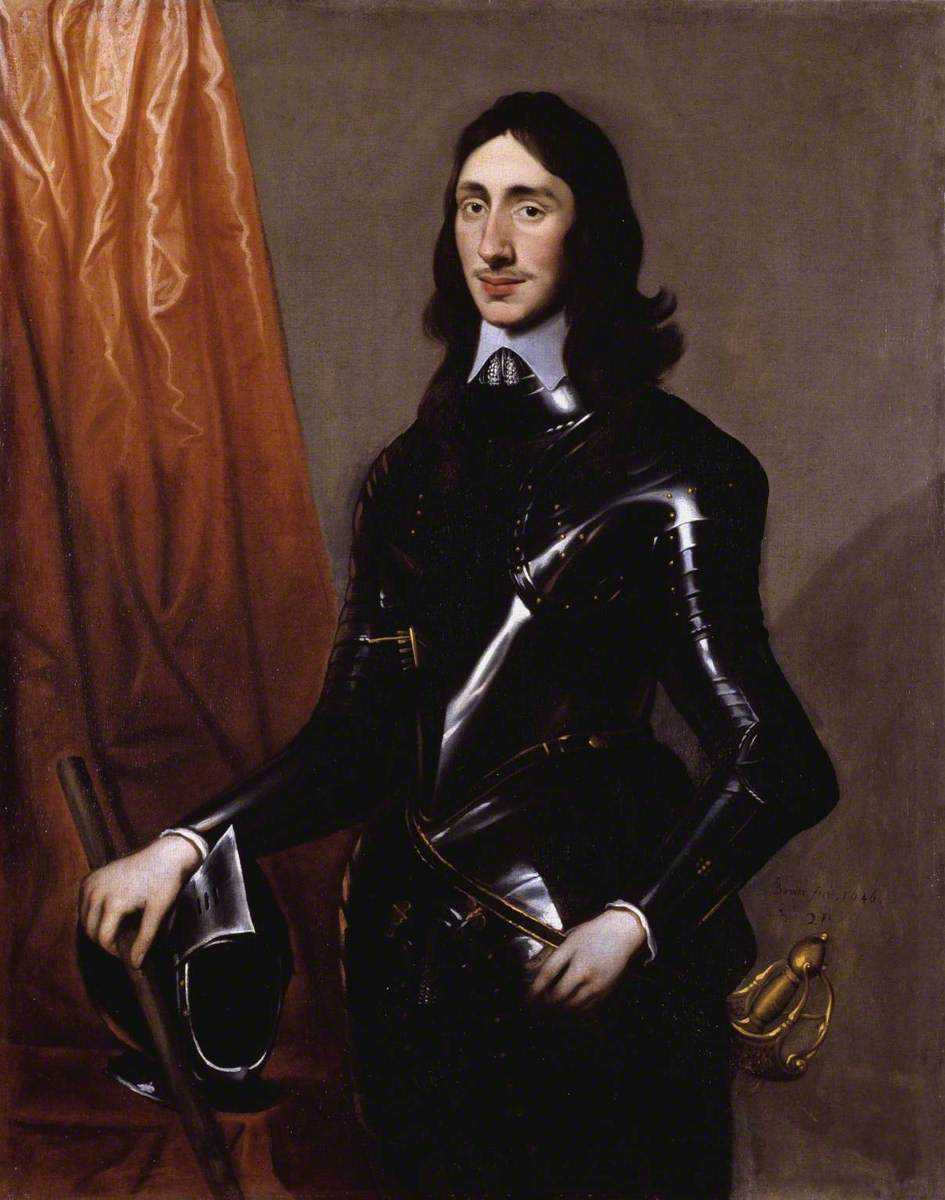
Portrait by Edward Bower, 1648

Sir John Drake, 1st Baronet (4 April 1625 – 6 July 1669) was an English politician who sat in the House of Commons in 1660. Drake was the son of Sir John Drake of Mount Drake and Ashe, and his wife Eleanor Boteler, daughter of John Boteler, 1st Baron Boteler of Brantfield.

== Personal life and political career ==
In 1660, Drake was elected Member of Parliament for Bridport in the Convention Parliament. He was created baronet of Ashe, in the County of Devon on 31 August 1660.

Drake died at the age of 44.

Drake married, firstly, Jane Yonge, daughter of Sir John Yonge, 1st Baronet, and, secondly, Dionysia Strode, daughter of Sir Richard Strode of Newnham. Drake was succeeded by his three sons from both marriages in turn. His sister Elizabeth married Sir Winston Churchill and was the mother of the first Duke of Marlborough.

Baronetage of England
New creation	Baronet (of Ashe); 1660–1669	Succeeded by John Drake
