= St Andrew's Church, Buckland Monachorum =

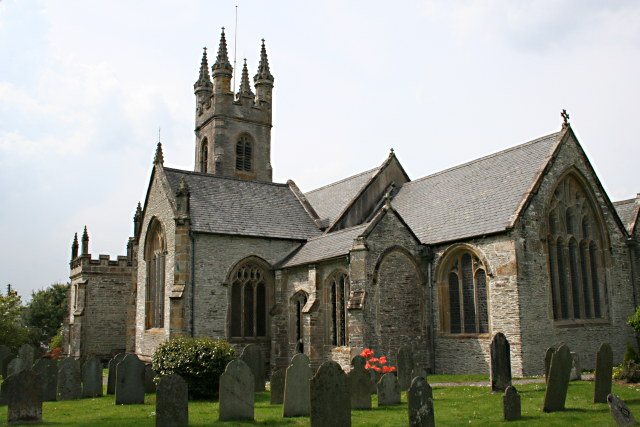
- St Andrew's Church, Buckland Monachorum

- Location within Devon
- 50°29′42.8″N 4°7′48″W
- OS grid reference: SX 49022 68334
- Location: Buckland Monachorum
- Country: England
- Denomination: Church of England
- Previous denomination: Roman Catholic

History
- Dedication: Saint Andrew

Architecture
- Heritage designation: Grade I listed
- Designated: 21 March 1967

Administration
- Province: Canterbury
- Diocese: Exeter
- Archdeaconry: Plymouth
- Deanery: Tavistock
- Parish: Buckland Monachorum

St Andrew's Church, Buckland Monachorum is a Grade I listed parish church in the Church of England Diocese of Exeter in Buckland Monachorum, Devon.

== History ==
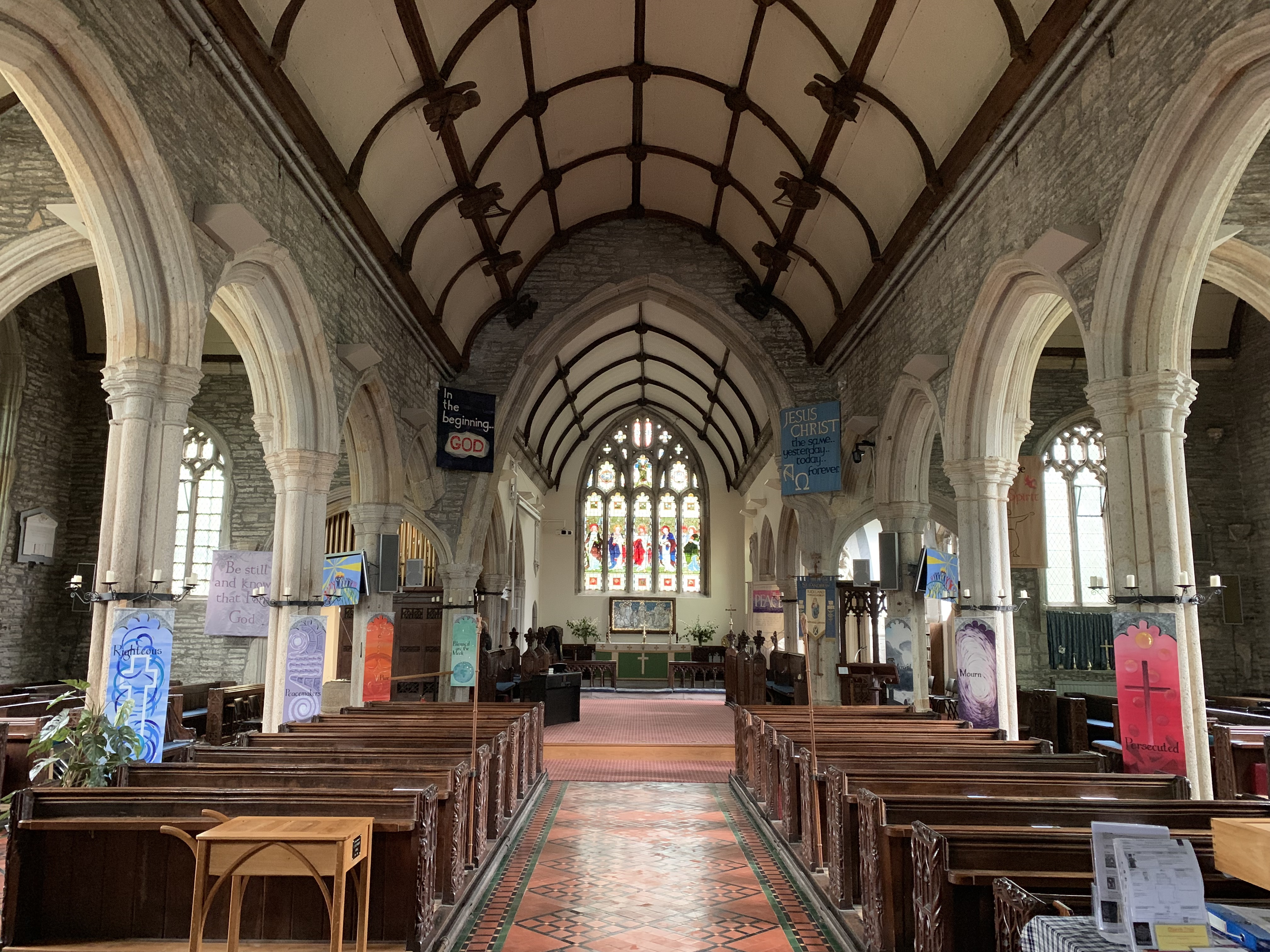
The nave, aisles and chancel from the west end

The church is medieval, but much was rebuilt in the late 15th century.

A restoration was undertaken in 1868-69 under the supervision of Mr. H. Elliott, architect of Plymouth. The west end gallery was removed. The roof was restored. The old pews were replaced with new pews of oak. The medieval bench ends were preserved where possible and new ones carved in a similar style. The walls were plastered, and the windows were re-glazed with plain cathedral glass. A stained glass window by Heaton and Butler was installed at the east end with a representation of the Good Shepherd. The church reopened for worship on Thursday 8 July 1869.

The church is noted for the monuments in the Drake aisle. Those to George Augustus Eliott, 1st Baron Heathfield of 1795 and Sir Francis Henry Drake, 5th Baronet of 1794 are by John Bacon Senior. The memorial to Francis Augustus Eliott, 2nd Baron Heathfield is by John Bacon Junior and the memorial to Dame Eleanor Elliott Drake (d. 1841) is by Richard Westmacott.

=== Rectors ===
- 1271 Odo de Arundelle
- 1275 Nicholas de Peyntone
- 1276 John de Foresta
- 1305 Henry
- 1311 John de Trevelin
- 1334 Robert de Balraven
- 1349 Walter Weyringe
- 1349 Ralph Semia
- 1359 Robert Southam
- 1361 Jordan Fooke
- 1372 Walter Davy
- 1382 Thomas Wappelegh
- 1398 William Grim
- 1400 Gilbert Baker
- 1406 Thomas Bradelegh
- 1427 Walter Osborne
- 1478 Nicholas Jakys
- 1504 Robert Austyn alias Gumby
- 1533 Richard Hale
- 1536 Richard Gill
- 1542 Nicholas Swynerton
- 1557 John Tooker (the last Abbot of Buckland)
- 1564 William Vaughan
- 1573 Edmund Tyll
- 1589 Edmund Lawrye
- 1629 Christopher Lawrey
- 1646 Joseph Rowe
- 1708 Amos Crymes
- 1710 John Creed
- 1745 John Bedford
- 1752 Amos Crymes
- 1783 Charles Barter
- 1846 William Luke Nicholls
- 1851 John Thomas Walters
- 1853 John Lynes
- 1855 Richard James Hayne
- 1920 Lawrence Godfrey Chamberlen
- 1925 Charles Streat
- 1933 Bennett Guyon Leonard-Williams
- 1938 William Steel Dobson
- 1946 Francis John Cornish
- 1957 Reginald Charles Luckraft
- 1964 Peter Stanley Stephens
- 1974 Christophe Clarke Hughes
- 1984 Graham Michael Cotter
- 2019 Andrew Bowden

== Organ ==
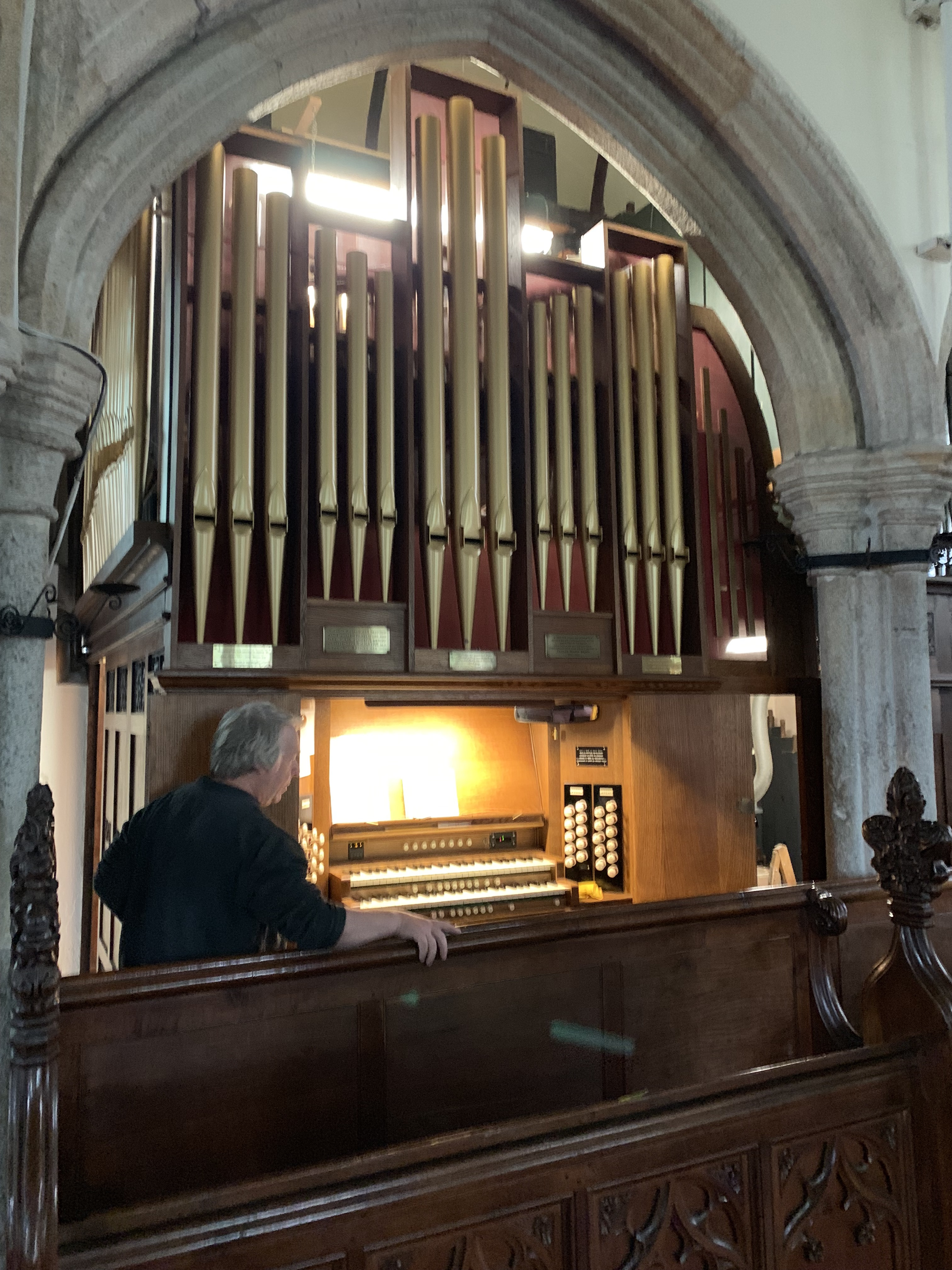
The organ

The organ was installed by H.P. Dicker of Exeter in 1849. It was playable either by a person on the keyboard, or by a barrel. It was the gift of Sir Thomas Fuller-Eliott-Drake, Bart.

It was expanded in 1920 by Hele & Co of Plymouth when a second manual was added. Subsequent rebuildings and enlargements have resulted in a 2 manual organ with 24 speaking stops. A specification of the organ can be found in the National Pipe Organ Register.

== Bells ==
The tower contains a peal of 8 bells. Five of the bells date from 1723 by Christopher and John Pennington, and 3 date from 1947 by Gillett & Johnston.
