= Drake baronets =

Extinct baronetcy in the Baronetage of England

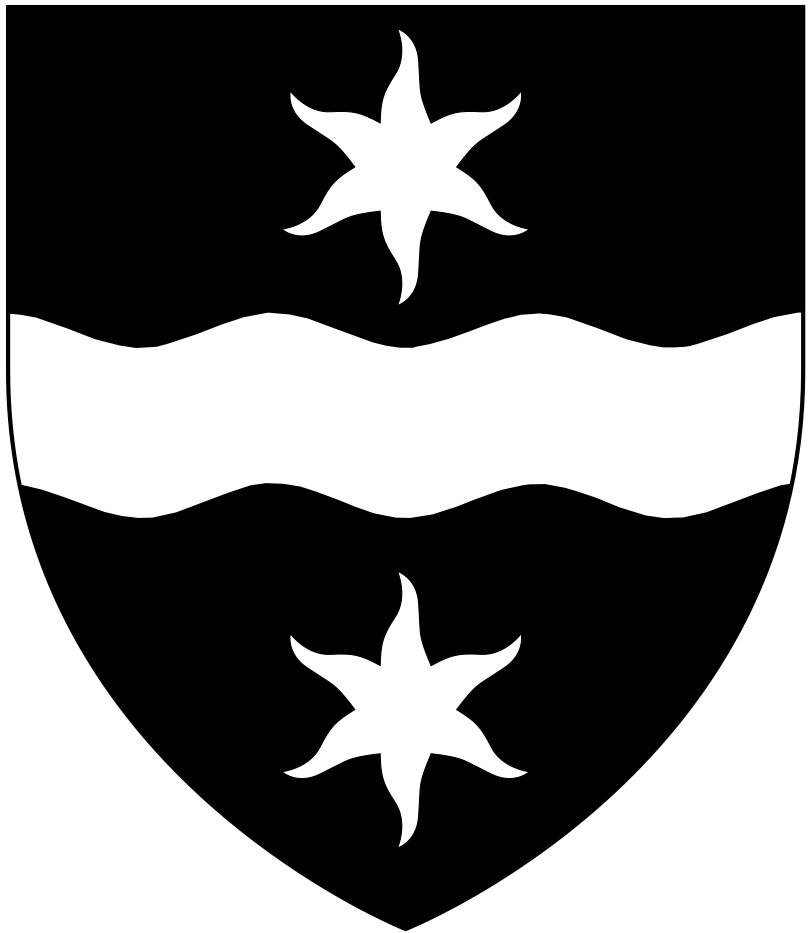
Arms of Drake Baronets of Buckland Abbey and Nutwell: Sable, a fess wavy between two pole-stars Arctic and Antarctic argent. These were the arms granted to the 1st Baronet's uncle, Admiral Sir Francis Drake (d.1596). As visible at Nutwell Court and in its parish church of Woodbury

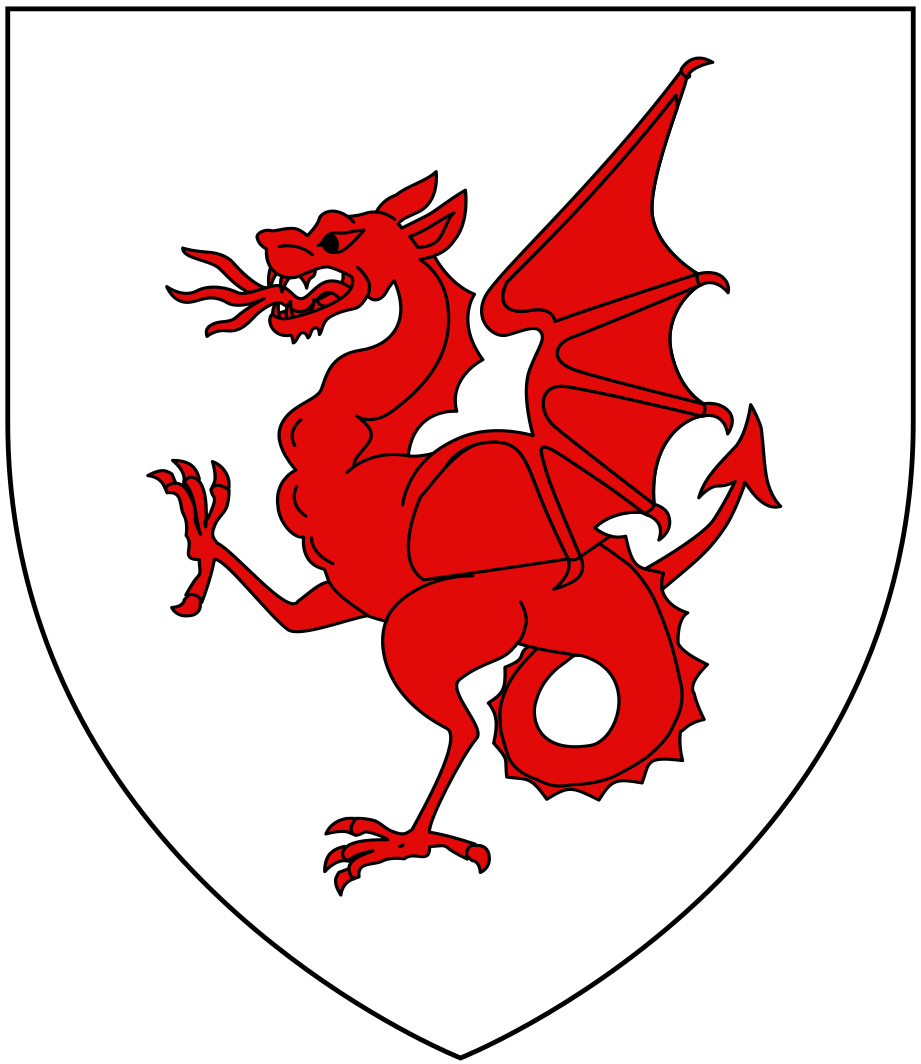
Arms of Drake of Ash: Argent, a wyvern wings displayed and tail nowed gules.

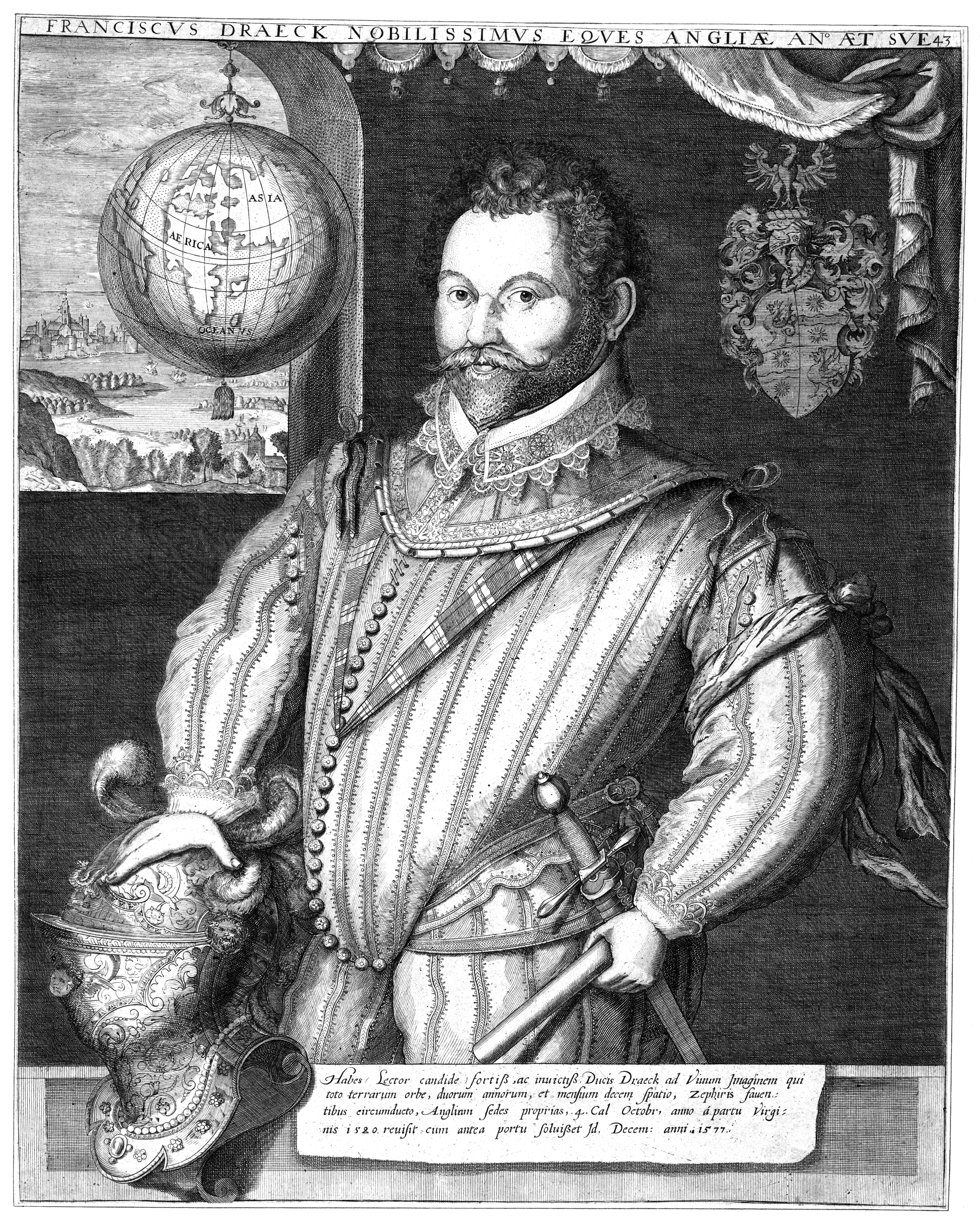
1577 engraving of Admiral Sir Francis Drake showing both Drake of Buckland and Drake of Ash Coat of arms quartered together

There have been four baronetcies created for people with the surname Drake, three in the Baronetage of England and one in the Baronetage of Great Britain.

== Drake Baronetcy of Buckland ==
The Drake Baronetcy of Buckland, in the County of Devon, was created in the Baronetage of England on 2 August 1622 for Francis Drake, nephew of the privateer and explorer Sir Francis Drake. The first baronet was also a Member of Parliament, as were all his successors. The baronets' seat was originally Buckland Abbey, Sir Francis Drake's home, but upon their inheritance of Nutwell Court, near Exeter, the Drakes ceased to live year-round at Buckland. A daughter of the fourth baronet was the wife of George Augustus Eliott, 1st Baron Heathfield, the defender of Gibraltar, and their descendants ultimately inherited both Buckland Abbey and Nutwell Court. The baronetcy became dormant, and probably extinct, on the death of the fifth baronet in 1794.

=== Relationship to Drake of Ash ===
The family relationship or otherwise of Drake of Buckland to the more ancient family of Drake of Ash in the parish of Musbury, Devon, is illustrated by the famous story concerning the admiral's choice of armorials. After having received his knighthood, Drake the admiral unilaterally adopted the armorials of the ancient Devon family of Drake of Ash, near Musbury, to whom he claimed a distant but unspecified kinship. These arms were: Argent, a wyvern wings displayed and tail nowed gules. The head of that family, also a distinguished sailor, Sir Bernard Drake (d.1586), angrily refuted Sir Francis's claimed kinship and his right to bear his family's arms. That dispute led to "a box in the ear" being given to Sir Francis by Sir Bernard at court, as recorded by John Prince in his "Worthies of Devon" (1697). Queen Elizabeth, in order to assuage matters, awarded Sir Francis his own coat of arms, blazoned as follows:

Sable a fess wavy between two pole-stars [Arctic and Antarctic] argent, and for his crest, a ship on a globe under ruff, held by a cable with a hand out of the clouds; over it this motto, Auxilio Divino; underneath, Sic Parvis Magna; in the rigging whereof is hung up by the heels a wivern, gules, which was the arms of Sir Bernard Drake."

— Prince, "Worthies of Devon" (1697)

Nevertheless, Admiral Drake continued to quarter his new arms with the wyvern gules. The arms adopted by his nephew Sir Francis Drake, 1st Baronet (1588–1637) of Buckland were, according to Vivian (1895), the arms of Drake of Ash, but the wyvern without a "nowed" (knotted) tail. However the arms used by subsequent baronets, as is visible at Nutwell Court and in its parish church of Woodbury were the new arms granted in 1581 to Admiral Sir Francis Drake (d.1596).

== Drake Baronetcy of Shardeloes ==
The Drake Baronetcy of Shardeloes, in the County of Bucks, was created in the Baronetage of England on 17 July 1641 for William Drake, a cousin of the Drakes of Ashe discussed below. The only baronet was a Member of Parliament for Amersham, Bucks. The baronetcy became extinct on his death in 1669.

== Drake Baronetcy of Ashe ==
The Drake Baronetcy of Ashe, in the County of Devon, was created in the Baronetage of England on 31 August 1660 for John Drake, briefly a Member of Parliament for Bridport. The first Baronet was followed by his three sons in succession, the last of whom was succeeded by his two sons in turn. The first Baronet's sister, Elizabeth, married Sir Winston Churchill; they were the parents of the first Duke of Marlborough, who was probably born at the Drakes' seat, Ashe House, Musbury, Devon. The baronetcy became extinct on the death of the sixth baronet in 1733.

== Drake Baronetcy of Prospect ==
The Drake Baronetcy of Prospect, in the County of Devon, was created in the Baronetage of Great Britain on 28 May 1782 for Rear Admiral Francis Samuel Drake, son and brother of the Sir Francis Henry Drakes, fourth and fifth Baronets of Buckland. The baronetcy became extinct on his death in 1789.

== Drake baronets, of Buckland (1622) ==
- Sir Francis Drake, 1st Baronet (1588–1637)
- Sir Francis Drake, 2nd Baronet (1617–1662)
- Sir Francis Drake, 3rd Baronet (1642–1718)
- Sir Francis Drake, 4th Baronet (1694–1740)
- Sir Francis Henry Drake, 5th Baronet (1723–1794)

== Drake baronets, of Shardeloes (1641) ==
- Sir William Drake, 1st Baronet (1606–1669)

== Drake baronets, of Ashe (1660) ==
- Sir John Drake, 1st Baronet (1625–1669)
- Sir John Drake, 2nd Baronet (1647–1684)
- Sir Bernard Drake, 3rd Baronet (?-1687)
- Sir William Drake, 4th Baronet (1658–1716)
- Sir John Drake, 5th Baronet (ca. 1689–1724)
- Sir William Drake, 6th Baronet (ca. 1695–1733)

== Drake baronets, of Prospect (1782) ==
- Sir Francis Samuel Drake, 1st Baronet (1729–1789)

== See also ==
- Fuller-Eliott-Drake baronets
- Baron Seaton
