= John Bacon (sculptor, born 1740) =

British sculptor (1740–1799)

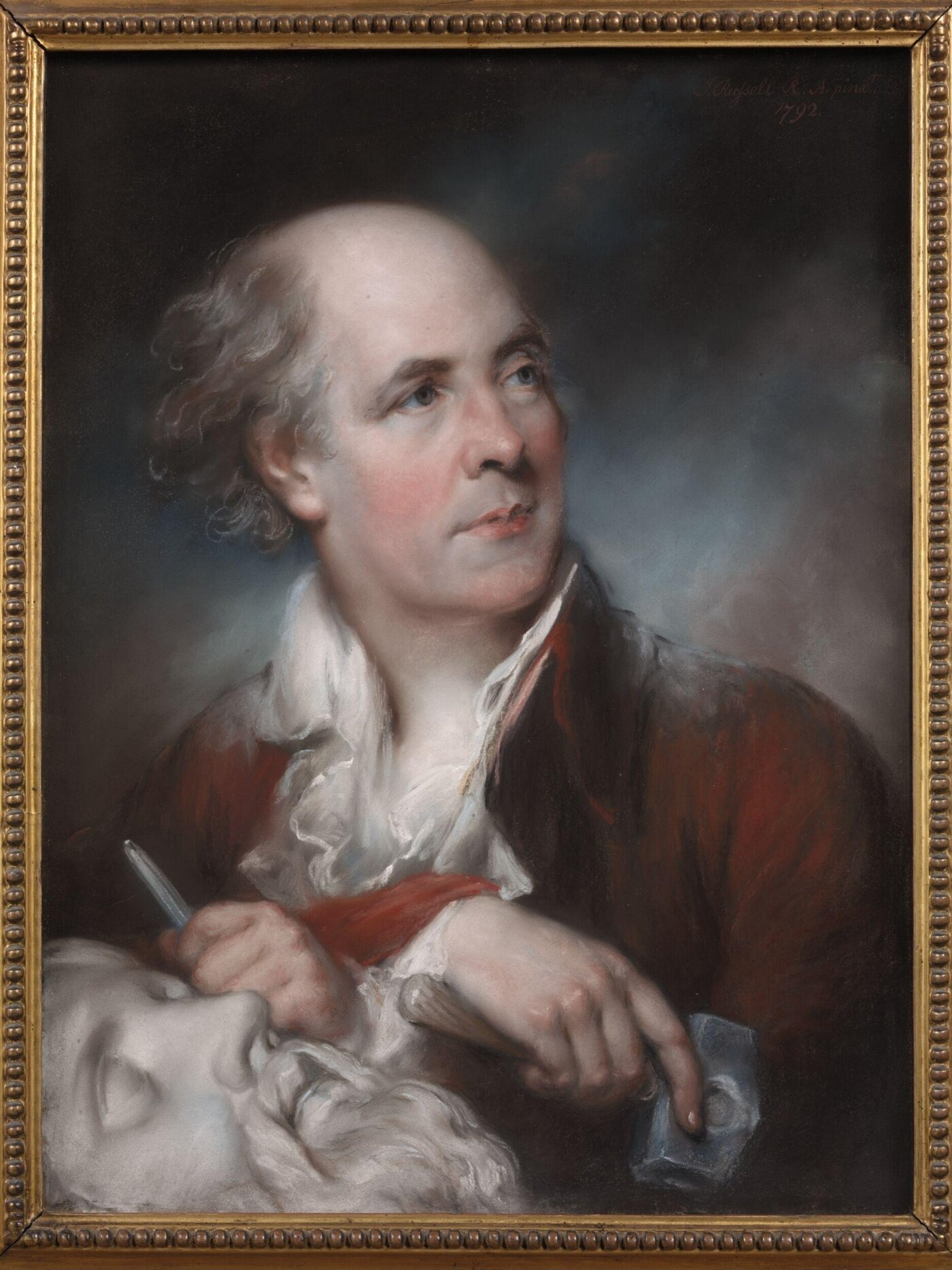
- portrait by John Russell
- Born: 24 November 1740; Southwark
- Died: 7 August 1799; London
- Occupation: Sculptor
- Children: John Bacon, Thomas Bacon, Ann Bacon

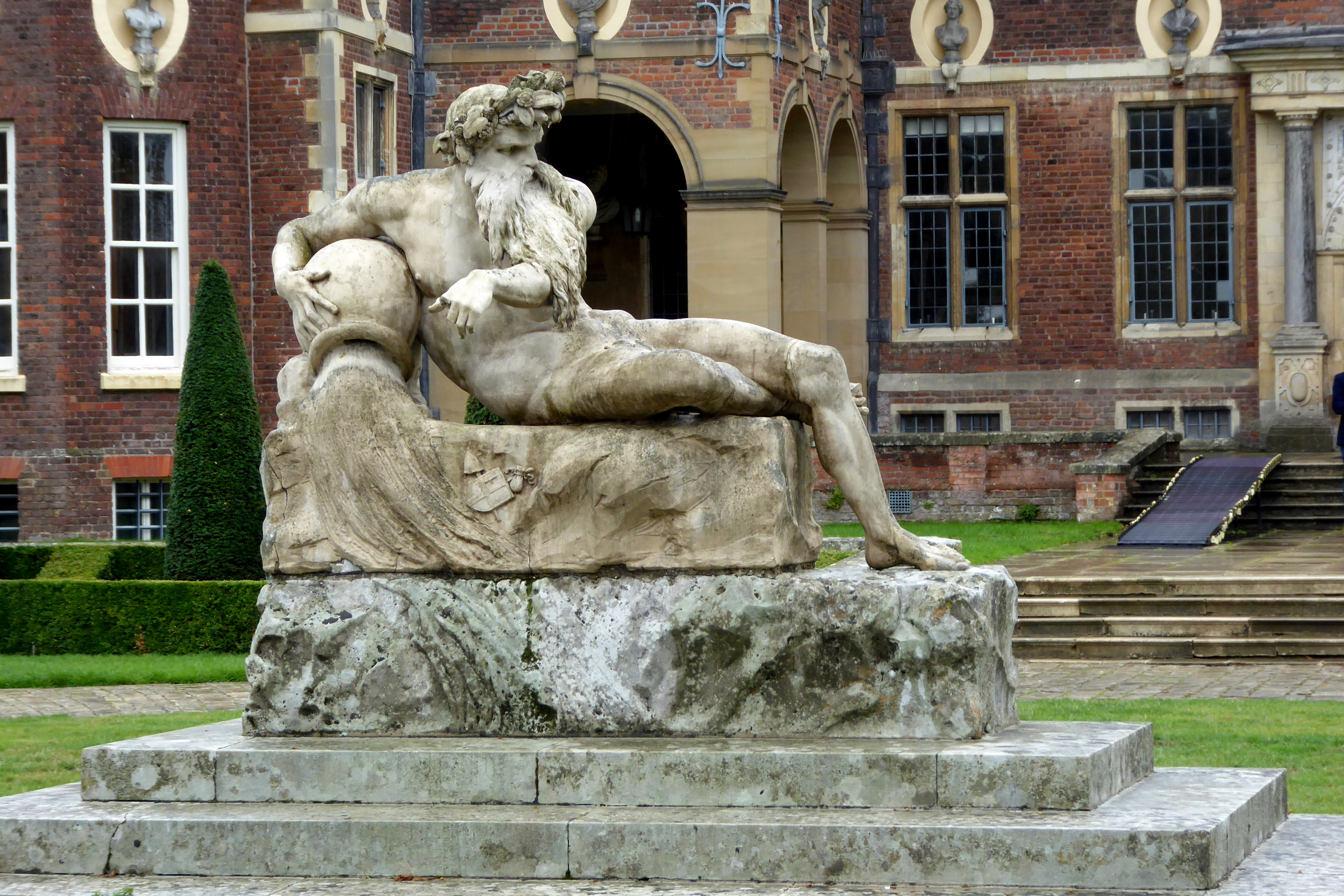
Bacon's sculpture of Father Thames in Coade stone, in the grounds of Ham House

John Bacon (24 November 1740 – 7 August 1799) was a British sculptor who worked in the late 18th century. Bacon has been reckoned the founder of the British School of sculpture. He won numerous awards, held the esteem of George III, and examples of his works adorn St Paul's Cathedral and Westminster Abbey in London, Christ Church, Oxford, Pembroke College, Oxford, Bath Abbey and Bristol Cathedral.

== Biography ==
John Bacon was born in Southwark on 24 November 1740, the son of Thomas Bacon, a clothworker whose family had formerly held a considerable estate in Somersetshire. At the age of fourteen, he was apprenticed to Mr Crispe's porcelain manufactory at Lambeth, where he was at first employed in painting small ornamental pieces of china. He was swiftly promoted to modeller and used the additional income to support his parents, then in straitened circumstances. Observing the models sent by different eminent sculptors to be fired at the adjoining pottery kiln determined the direction of his genius: he began imitating them with such proficiency that a small figure of Peace sent by him to the Society for the Encouragement of the Arts won a prize. Subsequently, its highest awards were given to him nine times between 1763 and 1776. During his apprenticeship, he also improved the method of working statues in stoneware, an art which he afterwards carried to perfection.

Bacon first attempted working in marble around 1763, when he resided in George Yard on Oxford Road near Soho Square. He exhibited a medallion of George III and a group of Bacchanalians that year and a bas relief of the Good Samaritan the next. During this period, he was led to improve the method of transferring the form of the model to the marble ("getting out the points") by the invention of a more perfect instrument for the purpose. This instrument possessed many advantages: it was more exact, took a correct measurement in every direction, was contained in a small compass, and could be used on either the model or the marble.

By 1769, Bacon was working for Eleanor Coade's Artificial Stone Manufactory. The same year he was awarded the first gold medal for sculpture awarded by the Royal Academy for a bas-relief representing the escape of Aeneas and Anchises from Troy. In 1770, he exhibited a figure of Mars, redone in marble the next year for Charles Pelhalm, which gained him the gold medal from the Society of Arts and his election as an associate of the Royal Academy (ARA). In 1771, Eleanor Coade appointed him works supervisor at her manufactory: he directed both model-making and design there until his death. In 1774, he was gifted with a new establishment at 17 Newman St. by a Mr Johnson who was a great admirer of his work. He executed a bust of George III for Christ Church, Oxford, and retained that king's favour throughout his life. Jealous competitors criticised him for ignorance of classic Greek sculpture, a charge he refuted with a bust of Jupiter Tonans. In 1795, he completed a statue of John Howard for St Paul's Cathedral. That statue was the first to be erected on the floor of the cathedral, ending a century-long prohibition on monuments in the body of that church. Bacon was considered the most successful public sculptor in England at the time and the church authorities awarded him the commissions for the next two statues erected in the cathedral, that of Samuel Johnson in 1795 and of the judge Sir William Jones in 1799.

On 4 August 1799 Bacon suddenly developed an "inflammation" and died a little more than two days later on the 7th. He was buried in Whitefield's Tabernacle in London. (Note: His body rests beneath an inscription reading: "What I was as an Artist, / Seemed to me of some importance / While I lived; / But / What I really was as a Believer / In Christ Jesus,/ Is the only thing of importance / To me now.") His estate was valued at £60,000, which was divided equally among his children. His widow was his second wife; he left a family composed of six sons and three daughters. His sons Thomas Bacon and John Bacon Jr. continued his work, and one of his daughters married a Mr Thornton. His memoirs were edited by Rev. Cecil and published in 1801.

== Legacy ==
Bacon has been reckoned the founder of the British School of sculpture, although he himself considered Roubiliac's statue of Eloquence for Waterloo Bridge to be such a fine piece of sculpture that he was sure he could never equal it. He won numerous awards, held the esteem of George III, and continued to be praised in the 19th and 20th centuries. His works adorn St Paul's Cathedral and Westminster Abbey in London, Christ Church, Oxford, Pembroke College, Oxford, Bath Abbey and Bristol Cathedral.

== Selected public works ==
=== 1770–1779 ===
Image	Title / subject	Location and coordinates	Date	Type	Material	Dimensions	Designation	Wikidata	Notes
	George Montagu-Dunk, 2nd Earl of Halifax	Westminster Abbey, London	1771	Bust with sculpture group	Marble				
	Memorial to Thomas Gray	Westminster Abbey, London	1771	Sculpture with medallion portrait	Marble				
	George III	Windsor Castle	1775	Bust	Marble				
	Aesculapius	Guy's Hospital, London	c. 1774	Statue in niche	Stone			Q96801491	
	Hygieia	Guy's Hospital, London	c. 1774	Statue in niche	Stone				
More images	Old Father Thames	Forecourt of Ham House	1775	Statue on plinth and steps	Coade stone		Grade II	Q26487358	
More images	Bernard Brocas of Beaureparie (1730-1777)	St James' Church, Bramley, Hampshire	After 1777	Sculpture group on tomb chest	Marble		Grade I		
More images	William Pitt, 1st Earl of Chatham	Westminster Abbey, London	1778	Monumental sculpture group	Marble				
More images	Monument to Thomas Guy	Guy's Hospital Chapel, London	1779	Sculpture group on pedestal	Marble				
More images	George III with the River Thames	Somerset House, London	1779	Sculpture groups on pedestal	Bronze and stone		Grade I	Q17527239	

=== 1780–1789 ===
Image	Title / subject	Location and coordinates	Date	Type	Material	Dimensions	Designation	Wikidata	Notes
	Charles Roe	Christ Church, Macclesfield	1781	Low relief sculpture	Black & white marble		Grade II*		
More images	William Pitt, 1st Earl of Chatham	Guildhall, London	1782	Monumental sculpture group	Marble				

=== 1790–1794 ===
Image	Title / subject	Location and coordinates	Date	Type	Material	Dimensions	Designation	Wikidata	Notes
More images	Memorial to Ann Whytell	Westminster Abbey, London	1791	Sculpture group	Marble				
	John Thomas, Bishop of Rochester	Westminster Abbey, London	1793	Bust	Marble				Also attributed to John Bacon, Junior
	Memorial to Henry Hope	Westminster Abbey, London	1793	Deep relief sculpture	Marble				
	Memorial to Etheldred Cust	Church of Saint Peter and St. Paul, Belton, South Kesteven	1793	Plaque with relief			Grade I		
	Memorial to Sir Francis Henry Drake, 5th Baronet	St Andrew's Church, Buckland Monachorum, Devon	After 1794	Low relief sculpture on narrow pedestal	Marble		Grade I		

=== 1795–1799 ===
Image	Title / subject	Location and coordinates	Date	Type	Material	Dimensions	Designation	Wikidata	Notes
	Memorial to George Augustus Eliott, 1st Baron Heathfield	St Andrew's Church, Buckland Monachorum, Devon	1795	Sculpture group and portrait medallion on pedestal	Marble		Grade I		
More images	John Howard	St Paul's Cathedral, London	1795	Statue on pedestal	Marble				
	Atlas and Hercules	Radcliffe Observatory, Oxford	1795	Sculpture group	Bronze		Grade I		
	Memorial to Sir George Pocock	Westminster Abbey, London	1796	Statue on narrow plinth	Marble				
More images	Dr Samuel Johnson	St Paul's Cathedral, London	1796	Statue on pedestal	Marble				
More images	Sir William Jones	St Paul's Cathedral, London	1799	Statue on pedestal	Marble				
	Memorial to William Mason	Westminster Abbey, London	1799	Relief sculpture	Marble				

=== Other works ===
- Bust of Samuel Johnson, Pembroke College, Oxford
- Bust of George III in Christ Church, Oxford (1770)
- Bust of John Guise in Christ Church, Oxford (1770)
- Seated statue of William Blackstone, the Codrington Library, All Souls, Oxford (1784)
- Pediment, Guy's Hospital, London (c. 1774)
- Chimneypiece for the Duke of Richmond at Goodwood House (1777)
- Bust of Samuel Foote exhibited at Royal Academy (1778)
- Monument to Mrs Draper, Bristol Cathedral (1780)
- Bust of Sir Francis Dashwood for his mausoleum at West Wycombe, Buckinghamshire (1780)
- Bust of Inigo Jones for the Carpenters Hall, London (1780)
- Monument to James Harris in Salisbury Cathedral (1780)
- Monument to John Bentley Ashley and his wife, Church of St Leogidanius, Ashby St Ledgers, Northamptionshire (1784)
- Statue of Henry VI for Eton College sited in the Upper Chapel (1786)
- Memorial to Admiral Samuel Graves in Dunkeswell, Devon (1787)
- Monument to Sir Walden Hanmer, 1st Baronet, at Simpson, Buckinghamshire (1789)
- Monument to James Dennis, 1st Baron Tracton in Cork, Ireland (1781)
- Ornate chimney-piece at Fonthill Abbey (1790)
- Ornate chimney-piece for Warren Hastings at Daylesford House (1793)
- Monument to John Milton in St Giles Cripplegate, London (1793)
- Bust of the 3rd Duke of Portland for the Rockingham Mausoleum at Wentworth Woodhouse (1793)
- Bust of John Howard for Shrewsbury Prison (1793)
- Pediment for the offices of the East India Company (1797–99)
- Monument to Samuel Whitbread at Cardington, Bedfordshire (1799)
