= John Colborne, 1st Baron Seaton =

British Army officer (1778–1863)

Field Marshal The Right Honourable The Lord Seaton GCB GCMG GCH PC (Ire)
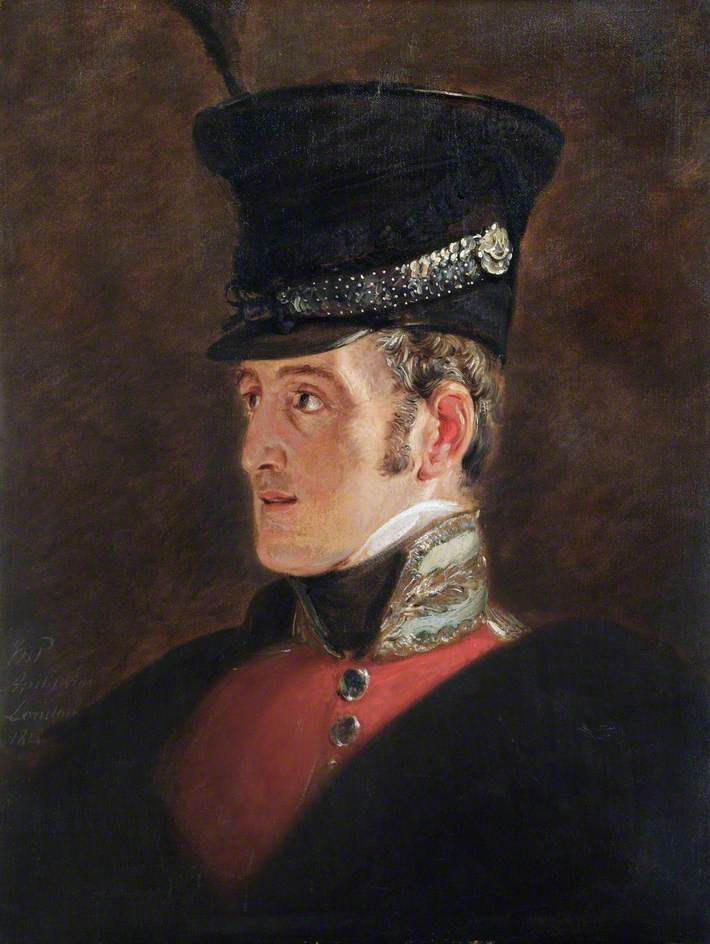
- Portrait by Jan Willem Pieneman, 1821
- Born: 16 February 1778; Lymington, Hampshire, England
- Died: 17 April 1863 (aged 85); Torquay, Devon, England
- Military career
- Allegiance: Great Britain; United Kingdom
- Branch: British Army
- Service years: 1794–1860
- Rank: Field marshal
- Nickname: "Le vieux brûlot" ("the old fire-breather")
- Commands: 2nd Bn 66th Regiment of Foot; 52nd Regiment of Foot; Commander-in-Chief, Ireland
- Conflicts: French Revolutionary Wars; Napoleonic Wars; Canadian Rebellions
- Awards: Knight Grand Cross of the Order of the Bath; Knight Grand Cross of the Order of St Michael and St George; Knight Grand Cross of the Royal Guelphic Order

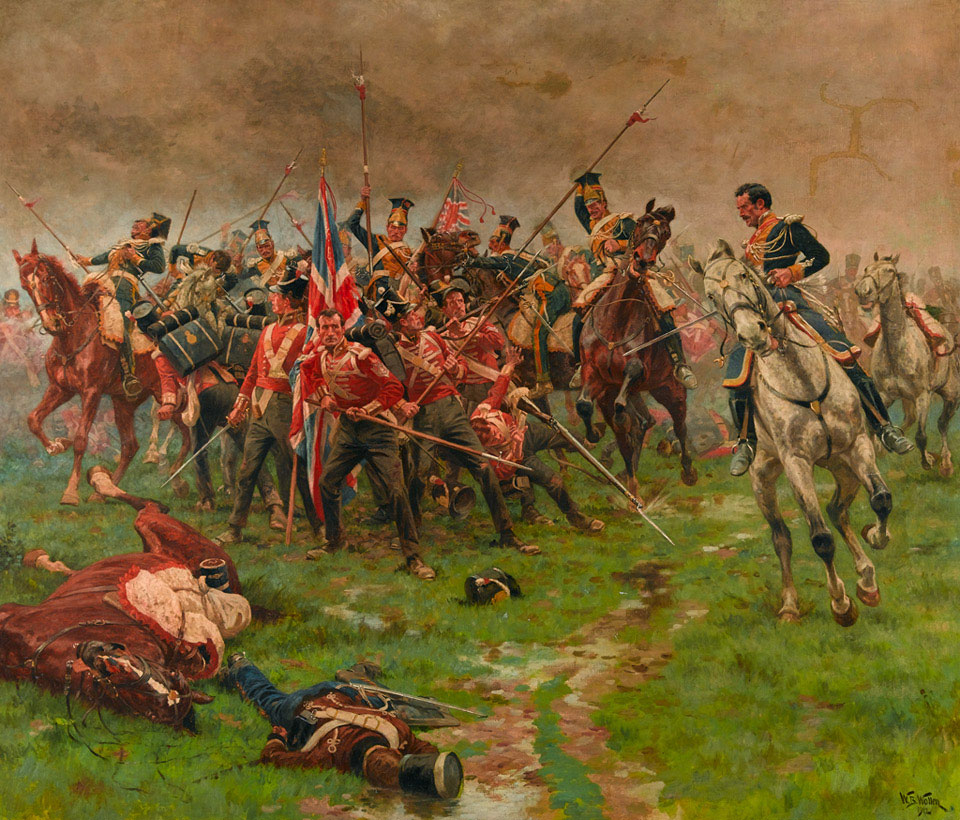
The Battle of Albuera by William Barnes Wollen. Destruction of Colborne's brigade during the 1811 Battle of Albuera

Field Marshal John Colborne, 1st Baron Seaton, GCB, GCMG, GCH, PC (Ire) (16 February 1778 – 17 April 1863) was a British Army officer and colonial governor. After taking part as a junior officer in the Anglo-Russian invasion of Holland, Sir Ralph Abercromby's expedition to Egypt and then the War of the Third Coalition, he served as military secretary to Sir John Moore at the Battle of Corunna.

Colborne then commanded the 2nd Battalion of the 66th Regiment of Foot and, later, the 52nd Regiment of Foot at many of the battles of the Peninsular War. At the Battle of Waterloo, Colborne on his own initiative brought the 52nd Regiment of Foot forward, took up a flanking position in relation to the French Imperial Guard and then, after firing repeated volleys into their flank, charged at the Guard so driving them back in disorder.

He went on to become commander-in-chief of all the armed forces in British North America, personally leading the offensive at the Battle of Saint-Eustache in Lower Canada and defeating the rebel force in December 1837. After that he was high commissioner of the Ionian Islands and then Commander-in-Chief, Ireland.

== Early career and the Peninsular War ==
Born in Lymington, Hampshire the only son of Samuel Colborne also from Lymington and Cordelia Anne Colborne (née Garstin), Colborne was educated at Christ's Hospital in London and at Winchester College. He was commissioned as an ensign in the 20th Regiment of Foot on 10 July 1794 securing all subsequent steps in his regimental promotion without purchase. Promoted to lieutenant on 4 September 1795 and to captain lieutenant on 11 August 1799, he saw action at the Battle of Alkmaar in October 1799, where he was wounded, during the Anglo-Russian invasion of Holland. Promoted to brevet captain on 12 January 1800, he took part in Sir Ralph Abercromby's expedition to Egypt in August 1801 and was wounded again.

Colborne was deployed with his regiment to Italy where he distinguished himself at the Battle of Maida in July 1806 during the War of the Third Coalition. He became military secretary to General Henry Fox in 1806 and then became military secretary to Sir John Moore with the rank of major on 21 January 1808. In this capacity he accompanied Moore to Sweden in May 1808 and to Portugal in 1808 and served with him at the Battle of Benavente in December 1808 and Battle of Corunna in January 1809. It was Moore's dying request that Colborne should be given a lieutenant colonelcy and this was complied with on 2 February 1809. He transferred to the 66th Regiment of Foot on 2 November 1809, and after returning to Spain with Sir Arthur Wellesley's Army, he witnessed the defeat of the Spaniards at the Battle of Ocaña later that month. He commanded a brigade at the Battle of Bussaco in September 1810 and then commanded the 2nd Battalion of the 66th Regiment of Foot at the Battle of Albuera in May 1811 where his brigade was virtually annihilated by the Polish 1st Vistulan Lancers Regiment of the French Army. After transferring to the command of the 52nd Regiment of Foot he took part in the Siege of Ciudad Rodrigo in January 1812 where he was badly injured and had to be invalided back to England.

After recovering in England, Colborne returned to Spain and commanded the 52nd Regiment of Foot at the Siege of San Sebastián in August 1813 before taking temporary charge of the 2nd brigade of the Light Division in late 1813 and commanding it at the Battle of the Bidassoa in October 1813, at the Battle of Nivelle in November 1813 and at the Battle of the Nive in December 1813. He returned to the 52nd Regiment of Foot and commanded it at the Battle of Orthez in February 1814 and at the Battle of Toulouse in April 1814 and at the Battle of Bayonne also in April 1814. He was appointed a Knight Commander of the Order of the Bath on 4 January 1815.

== Waterloo ==
Colborne became aide-de-camp to the Prince Regent with the rank of colonel on 4 June 1814, and, following Napoleon's escape from Elba, he managed to dissuade the Prince from attacking the French Army until the Duke of Wellington arrived.

At the Battle of Waterloo in June 1815 during the Hundred Days, Colborne led the 52nd Regiment of Foot. At the critical moment of the battle, when the French Imperial Guard attacked Wellington's weakened centre, Colborne made a decisive intervention. On his own initiative, Colborne brought the 52nd Regiment of Foot forward, took up a flanking position in relation to the Imperial Guard and then, after firing repeated volleys into their flank, charged at the Guard so driving them back in disorder. As soon as General Sir Frederick Adam saw what Colborne was doing, he sent in extra troops to support him. Colborne drove forward towards La Haye Sainte, while Wellington rode back to the main line to order the general advance.

He was appointed a Knight of the Austrian Military Order of Maria Theresa on 2 August 1815. After the war he remained with his regiment as part of the Army of Occupation.

== Guernsey ==
Colborne became Lieutenant Governor of Guernsey in July 1821 and was promoted to major-general on 27 May 1825.

== Canada ==
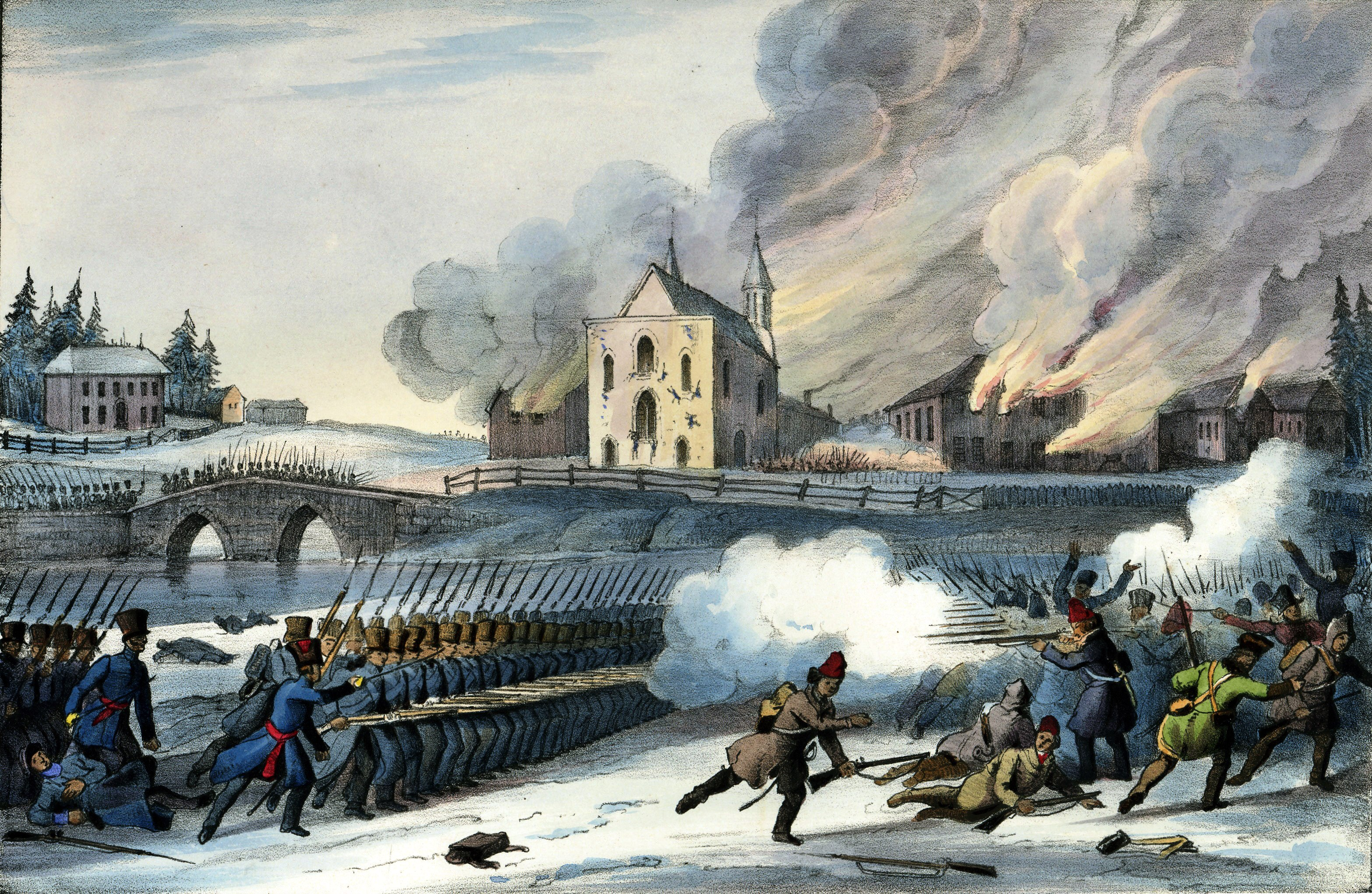
Colborne's troops attack the insurgents and torch the church at the Battle of Saint-Eustache

In August 1828, Colborne was appointed Lieutenant Governor of Upper Canada. As Lieutenant Governor, Colborne increased the population of the province by 70% by initiating an organised system of immigration to bring in settlers from Britain. He also aided settlement by expanding the communication and transportation infrastructure through a campaign to build roads and bridges. He brought changes to the structure of the legislative council, increased fiscal autonomy and encouraged greater independence in the judiciary. In 1829, he founded Upper Canada College at York as a school based on the Elizabeth College, Guernsey model to educate boys in preparation for becoming leaders of the colonies.

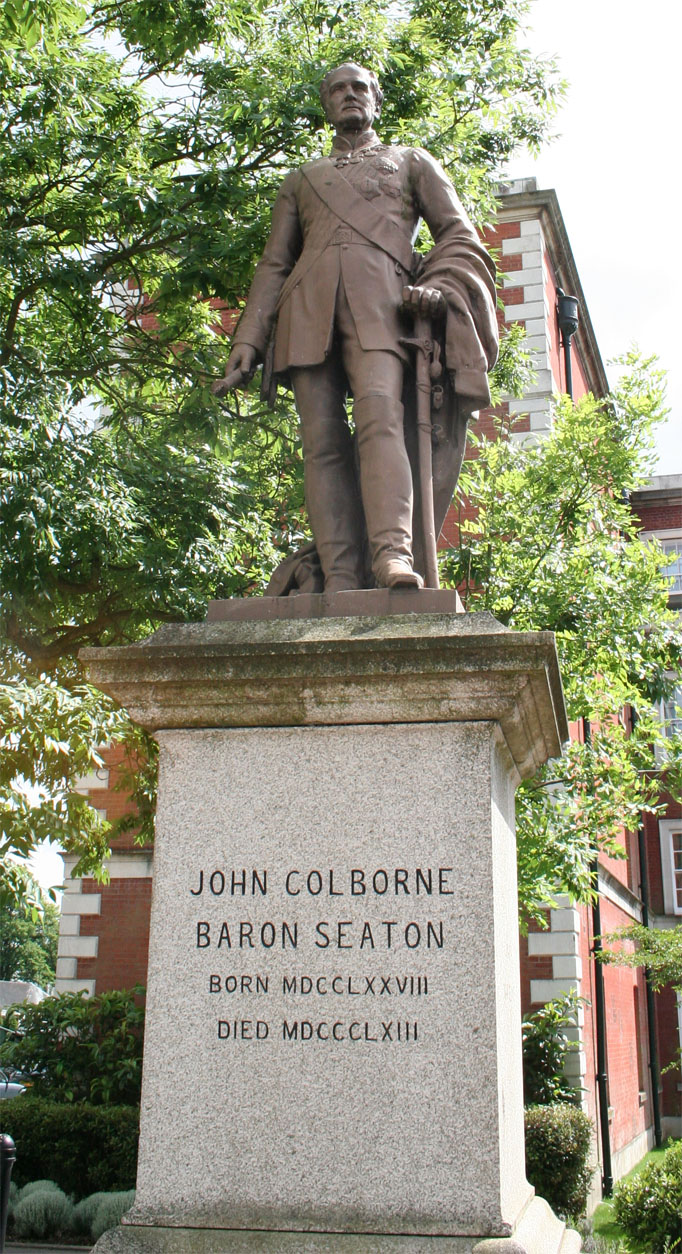
Bronze statue of John Colborne, sculpted by George Gammon Adams, now at Peninsula Barracks in Winchester, originally erected at Mount Wise, Plymouth in 1866

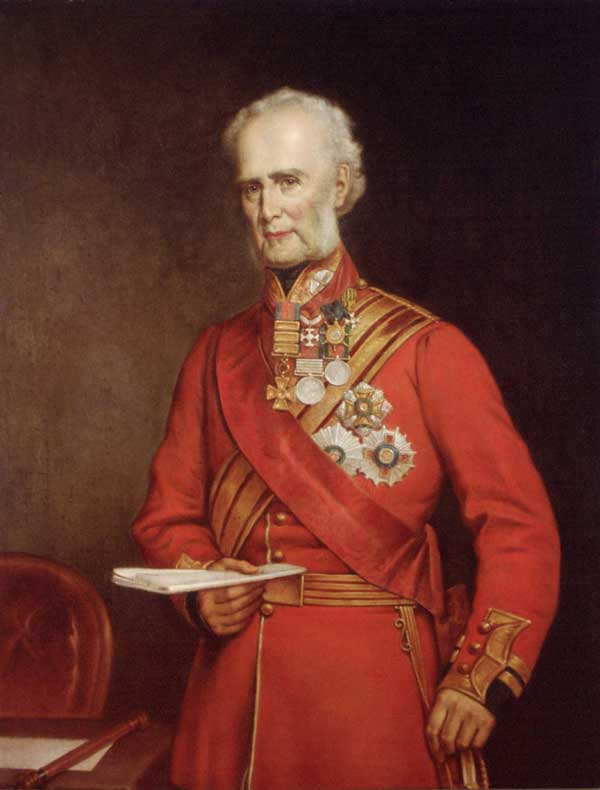
John Colborne, 1st Baron Seaton portrait by George Theodore Berthon

During Colborne's period of office as commander-in-chief, the Family Compact promoted resistance to the political principle of responsible government; the Compact was condemned by Charles Buller in 1838 as "a petty, corrupt, insolent Tory clique". In both Upper Canada, which was under Colborne's administration, and Lower Canada, which was under the direct administration of Colborne's superior, Governor General Lord Gosford, this resistance to responsible government, together with conflicts between the assembly and the executive over fiscal matters, as well as a difficult economic situation, led to the Rebellions of 1837.

In January 1836, Colborne became commander-in-chief of all the armed forces in British North America. He was promoted to the local rank of lieutenant general on 8 July 1836. Colborne personally led the offensive at the Battle of Saint-Eustache in December 1837 defeating the rebel force which had become holed up in a church. His forces burnt the church and set fire to surrounding buildings. Afterwards, he led the sack of the nearby village of Saint-Benoît, burning much of the village. The French-Canadians gave him the nickname "Le vieux brûlot" ("the old fire-breather").

Colborne was advanced to Knight Grand Cross of the Order of the Bath on 29 January 1838. Following Lord Gosford's resignation in February 1838, he became acting Governor General of British North America. In Lower Canada but not Upper Canada, the 1791 constitution was suspended at this time, causing the colony's bicameral parliament to be dissolved. To replace these bodies and assist in governing Lower Canada, Colborne established a 24-member Special Council.

Colborne stepped aside as acting Governor General until the arrival of Gosford's formal successor, Lord Durham, on 27 May 1838. Colborne was promoted to the substantive rank of lieutenant-general on 28 June 1838. Durham remained in Canada only for a few months, resigning on 9 October and leaving for London on the fifth-rate HMS Inconstant on 1 November, after he learned that his policy of leniency towards the leaders of the prior year's rebellion had been repudiated by the British Government. Durham's departure caused Colborne to again become acting Governor General. Colborne put down a second revolt in November and was confirmed as Governor General of British North America on 14 December. He left Canada in October 1839 after the arrival of his successor, Charles Poulett Thomson (who shortly thereafter would be elevated to the peerage as Lord Sydenham). After arriving back in England, Colborne was himself elevated to the peerage as Baron Seaton, of Seaton in the County of Devon, on 5 December 1839.

Lord Seaton's Annuity Act 1840
- Act of Parliament
- Parliament of the United Kingdom
- Long title: An Act to settle an Annuity on Lord Seaton and the Two next surviving Heirs Male of the Body of the said Lord Seaton to whom the Title of Lord Seaton shall descend in consideration of his important Services.
- Citation: 3 & 4 Vict. c. 11
- Territorial extent: United Kingdom

Dates
- Royal assent: 19 May 1840
- Commencement: 19 May 1840 (Note: The Acts of Parliament (Commencement) Act 1793.)
- Repealed: 18 December 1953
Other legislation
Repealed by	Statute Law Revision Act 1953

Status: Repealed

Text of statute as originally enacted

In recognition of the "important services" rendered by Colborne, and following a message from Queen Victoria, Parliament settled an annuity of £2,000 on him and the next two heirs male who would succeed to the title.

== Later life ==
Colborne became High Commissioner of the Ionian Islands in February 1843, and having been promoted to full general on 20 June 1854, he became Commander-in-Chief, Ireland, in 1855. After standing down from active service in Spring 1860, he was promoted to field marshal on 1 April 1860 and retired to his home at Beechwood House in Sparkwell.

Colborne also served as honorary colonel of the 94th Regiment of Foot, as honorary colonel of the 26th (Cameronian) Regiment of Foot and then as honorary colonel of the 2nd Regiment of Life Guards. He was also colonel-in-chief of the Rifle Brigade (Prince Consort's Own). He died at Valletta House in Torquay on 17 April 1863 and was buried in the churchyard of Holy Cross Church at Newton Ferrers.

In November 1866 a bronze statue of Colborne, sculpted by George Adams and financed by public donations, was erected at Mount Wise at Devonport: it was moved to Seaton Barracks in Crownhill in the early 1960s and then to Peninsula Barracks in Winchester in the 1990s. A second statue of Colborne also sculpted by George Adams was erected at Upper Canada College in Toronto, Ontario, Canada.

Colborne Street in London, Ontario is named after Colborne, as is the city of Port Colborne.

== Family ==
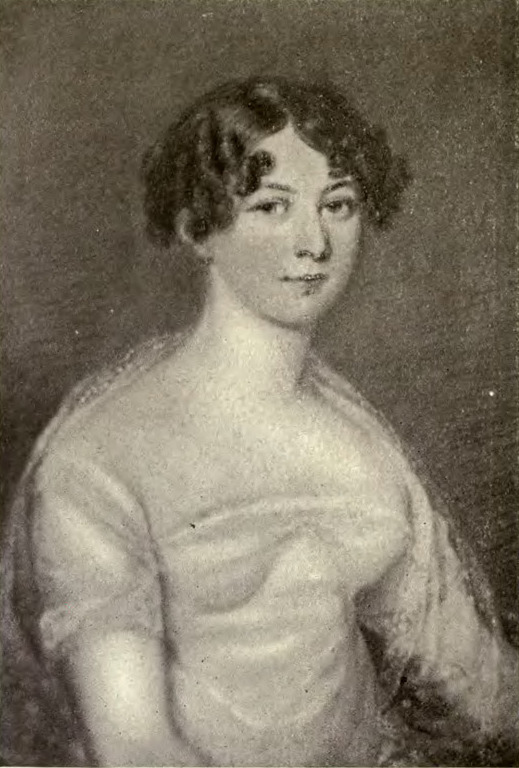
Elizabeth Yonge Seaton

In 1813 Colborne married Elizabeth Yonge; they had three daughters and five sons.

== See also ==
- Port Colborne, Ontario
- Colborne Lodge, Toronto
- Seaton Village, Toronto neighbourhood named for Colborne

== Bibliography ==
- Barbero, Alessandro (2005). The Battle. London: Atlantic Books. ISBN 1-84354-309-5.
- Heathcote, Tony (1999). The British Field Marshals, 1736–1997: A Biographical Dictionary. Barnsley: Leo Cooper. ISBN 0-85052-696-5.
- Lee, Robert (2004). The Canada Company and the Huron Tract, 1826–1853. Toronto: Natural Heritage Books. ISBN 1-896219-94-2.

Military offices
Preceded by Sir George Prevost	Commander-in-Chief, North America; 1836–1839	Vacant Title next held by Hon. Charles Cathcart
Preceded by Sir James Campbell	Colonel of the 94th Regiment of Foot; 1834–1838	Succeeded by Sir Thomas McMahon
Preceded by The Earl of Dalhousie	Colonel of the 26th (Cameronian) Regiment of Foot; 1838–1854	Succeeded by Sir Philip Bainbrigge
Preceded by The Marquess of Londonderry	Colonel of the 2nd Regiment of Life Guards; 1854–1863	Succeeded by The Earl Beauchamp
Preceded by Sir Edward Blakeney	Commander-in-Chief, Ireland; 1855–1860	Succeeded by Sir George Brown
Preceded by Prince Albert	Colonel-in-Chief of the Rifle Brigade; 1861–1863	Succeeded by Sir George Brown
Government offices
Preceded by Henry Bayly	Lieutenant Governor of Guernsey; 1821–1828	Succeeded by John Ross
Preceded by Sir Peregrine Maitland	Lieutenant Governor of Upper Canada; 1828–1836	Succeeded by Sir Francis Bond Head
Preceded by The Earl of Gosford	Acting Governor General of British North America; 1837–1838	Succeeded by The Earl of Durham as Governor General and high commissioner of British North America
Peerage of the United Kingdom
New creation	Baron Seaton; 1839–1863	Succeeded by James Colborne
Academic offices
Preceded by Sir Peregrine Maitland	Chancellor of King's College; 1828–1835	Succeeded by Sir Francis Bond Head
