= Baron Seaton =

Extinct barony in the Peerage of the United Kingdom

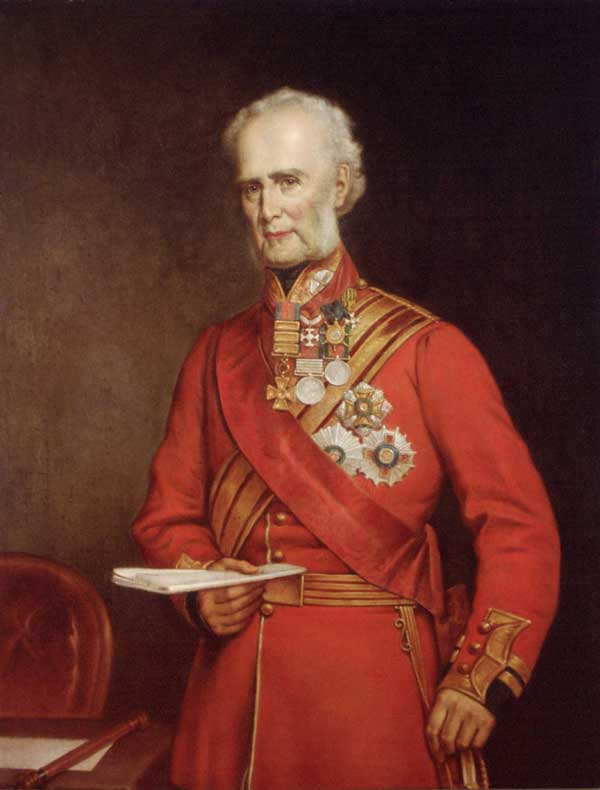
John Colborne, 1st Baron Seaton

Baron Seaton, of Seaton in the County of Devon, was a title in the Peerage of the United Kingdom. It was created on 14 December 1839 for the soldier and colonial administrator Sir John Colborne. He fought at the Battle of Waterloo and was Lieutenant Governor of Upper Canada from 1828 to 1836, acting Governor General of British North America from 1837 to 1838 and Commander-in-Chief of North America from 1838 to 1839. He later served as Commander-in-Chief of Ireland between 1855 and 1860 and was promoted to Field Marshal in 1860. Lord Seaton was succeeded by his eldest son, the second Baron. He was Military Secretary to his father when Commander-in-Chief of the Forces in Ireland.

On his death the titles passed to his eldest son, the third Baron. He was a Major in the Royal 1st Devon Yeomanry and fought in the Second Boer War and in the First World War. Lord Seaton married Elizabeth Beatrice (d. 1937), daughter of Sir Francis Fuller-Eliott-Drake, 2nd Baronet, of Nutwell Court and Buckland Abbey (a title which became extinct on his death in 1916), in 1887. In 1917 he assumed by Royal Licence the additional surnames of Eliott-Drake. Lord Seaton was childless and on his death in 1933 the title passed to his younger brother, the fourth Baron. He was a Major in the South Staffordshire Regiment and served in the Nile Expedition of 1884 to 1885, where he was severely wounded, in the Second Boer War and in the First World War. Lord Seaton married Caroline Mabel, daughter of Sir Arthur Pendarves Vivian, in 1904. In 1927 he assumed by Royal licence the additional surname of Vivian. He was also childless and on his death in 1955 the barony became extinct.

Another member of the Colborne family to gain distinction was the Hon. Sir Francis Colborne (1817–1895), second son of the first Baron. He was a General in the Army.

== Barons Seaton (1839) ==
- John Colborne, 1st Baron Seaton (1778–1863)
- James Colborne, 2nd Baron Seaton (1816–1888)
- John Eliott-Drake-Colborne, 3rd Baron Seaton (1854–1933)
- James Colborne-Vivian, 4th Baron Seaton (1863–1955)

== See also ==
- Fuller-Eliott-Drake baronets
