= Buckland Monachorum =

Coordinates: 50°29′44″N 4°07′51″W

- Village & civil parish
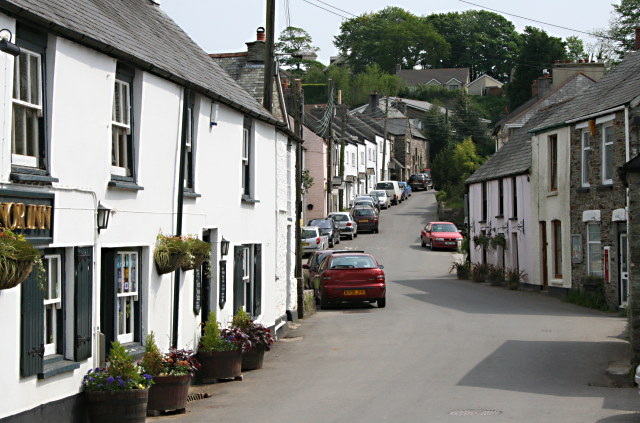
- Interactive map of Buckland Monachorum
- Country: United Kingdom
- Region: South West England
- County: Devon

Population (2006)
  - Total: 1,511
- Post code: PL20

Buckland Monachorum is a village and civil parish in the West Devon district of Devon, England, situated on the River Tavy, about 10 miles north of Plymouth.

In 2006 the neighbourhood had an estimated 1,511 residents and 654 dwellings. The electoral ward of the same name gave a population of 3,380 at the 2011 census. At the 2011 United Kingdom census the civil parish had a population of 3,763.

Domesday Book (1086) records Buckland Monachorum (Bocheland) as having 46 households, land for 15 ploughs, a salt pan and a fishery. It was in the possession of William de Poilley, one of 17 estates he held in southern Devon as a tenant-in-chief of William the Conqueror.

Near to Buckland Monachorum is Buckland Abbey, home of Sir Francis Drake during the Elizabethan era. The village is the site of St Andrew's, a 12th-century church with a Saxon baptismal font and the tombs of the Drake family and Lord Heathfield, the defender of Gibraltar, many historic buildings, and a complex of interesting gardens, known as "The Garden House". The Gift House, a seventeenth-century Almshouse, was built by a descendant of Sir Francis Drake.

The Drake Manor Inn - a public house, restaurant and B&B - is also situated in the village. A general store and Post Office was situated in the village until 2003. St Andrew's C of E Primary School is located in the village, providing education for around 200 pupils from the local area. In 2007 Ofsted judged the school 'outstanding'.

== Civil parish ==
In addition to Buckland Monachorum, the parish includes the villages of Yelverton, Clearbrook, Crapstone and Milton Combe.

== Notable people ==
- Sir Richard Grenville (b. 1542 – d. 1591), an English privateer and explorer.
- Vice-Admiral of the Red Francis William Drake (1724–1787) a Royal Navy officer, politician and colonial administrator.
- Sir William Elford, 1st Baronet (1749–1837), an English banker, politician, and amateur artist.
- Seth Lakeman (born 1977), Sam Lakeman (born 1975) and Sean Lakeman (born 1974), folk musicians who grew up locally as brothers.
