= Milton Combe =

Village in Devon, England

Coordinates: 50.472°N 4.133°W

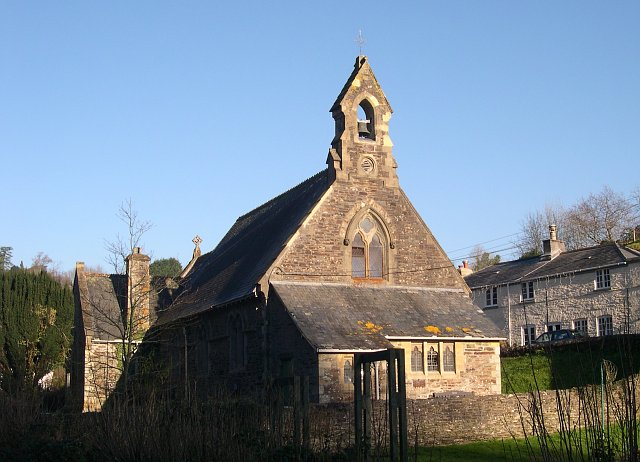
Milton Combe Church

Milton Combe is a village in Devon approximately 2 mi (3.2 km) from Yelverton and 8 mi (13 km) from the city of Plymouth. The name Milton Combe is derived from the village's historic name, first mentioned in 1249, of 'Mile Cumbe' literally meaning 'Middle Valley'. The Post Office gave the village its current name in 1890, to distinguish it from the many other 'Miltons' in the nearby area.

The Church of the Holy Spirit was built in 1878 and is in a joint parish with Buckland Monachorum. It is grade II listed.

During the Second World War, the village was used by inhabitants of the Royal Navy Hospital at Maristow, the American Army Camp at Bickham and RAF Harrowbeer. The village has its own small War Memorial dedicated to the men of Milton Combe who fell in the Second World War.

Milton Combe is known locally for its annual duck race along the Milton Brook starting from the Who'd Have Thought It public house through the village.
