= Buckland Abbey =

Grade I listed historic house museum in the United Kingdom

Coordinates: 50°28′52″N 4°08′01″W

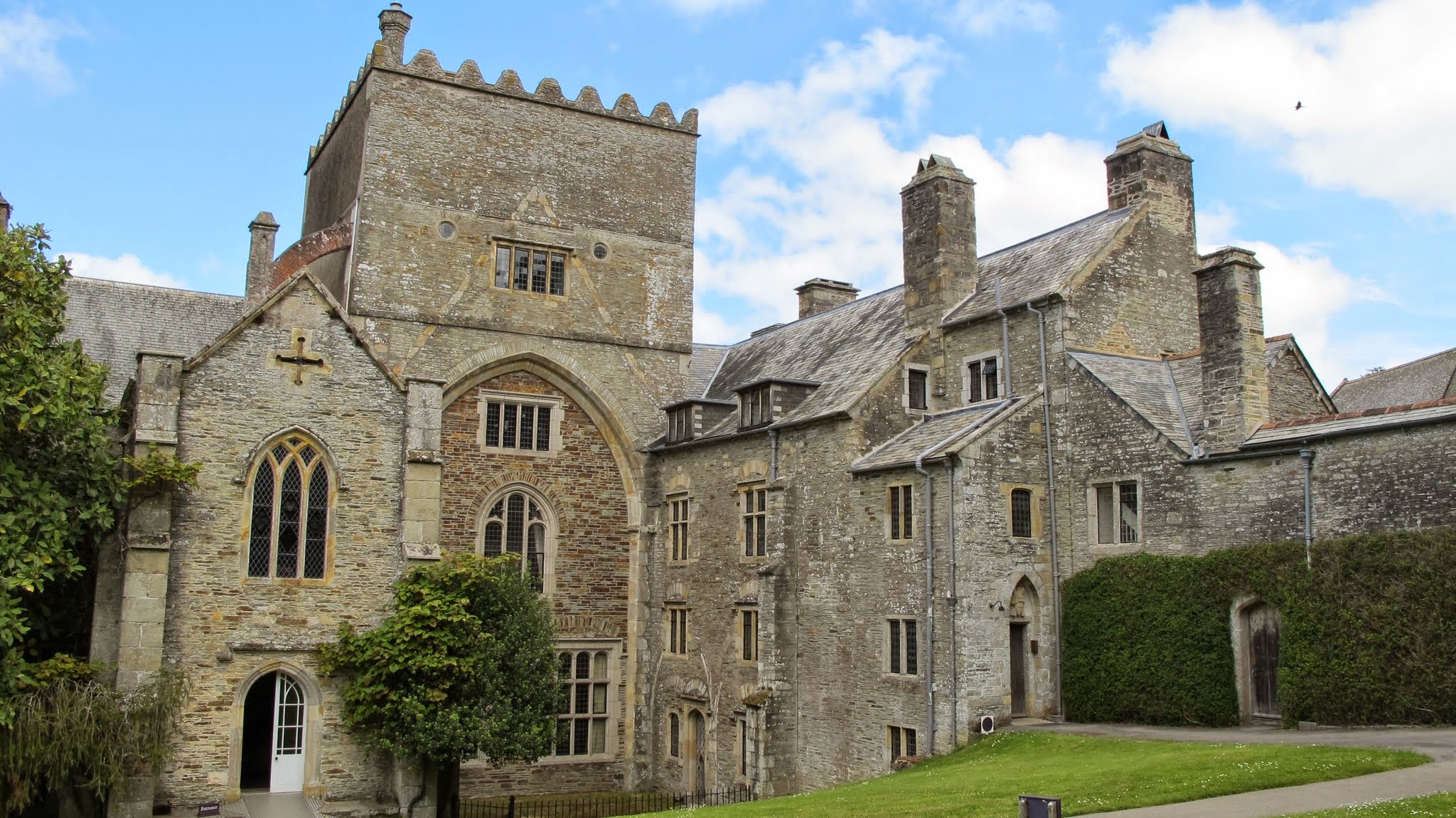
Buckland Abbey, front

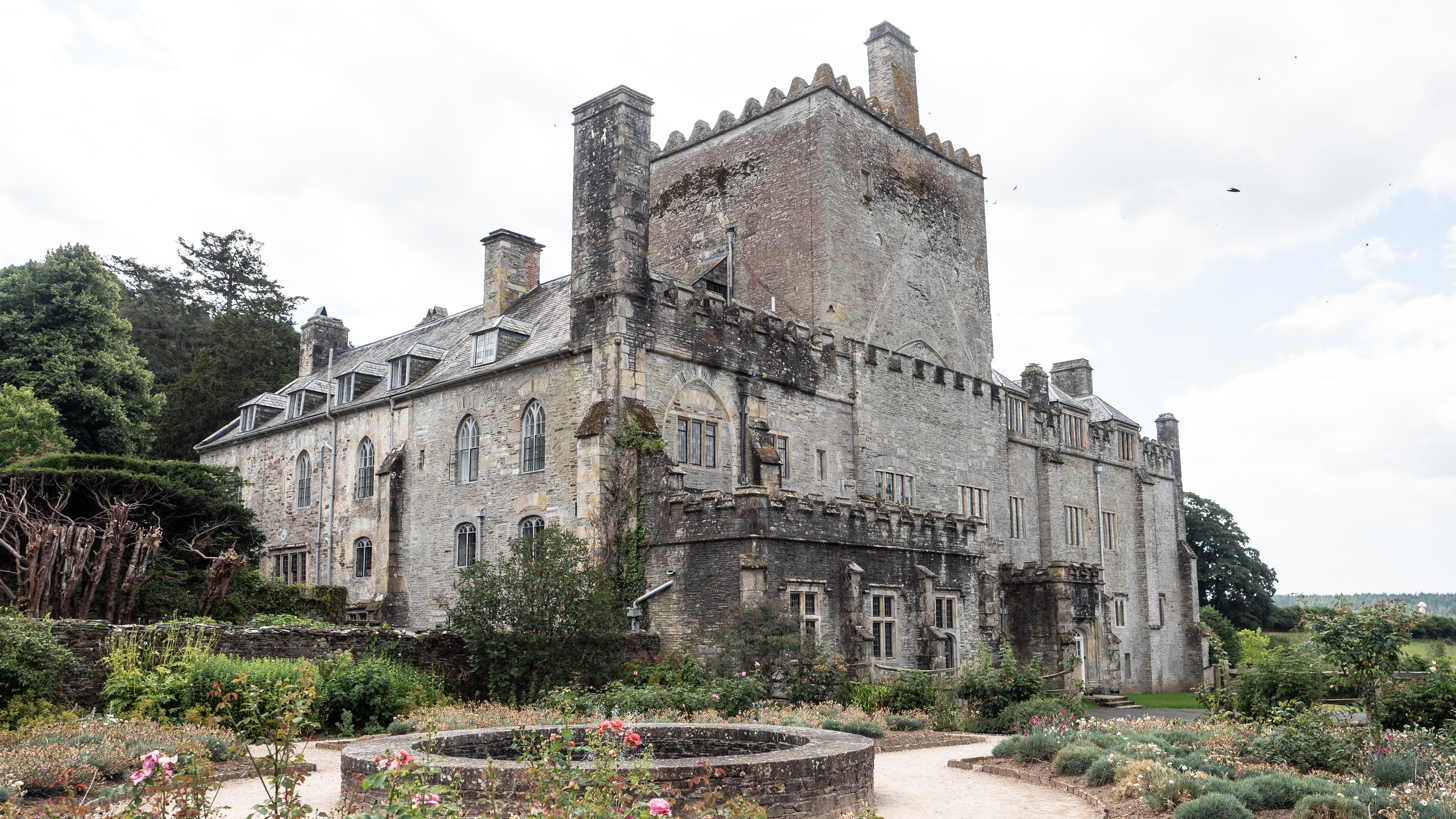
Buckland Abbey, rear view

Buckland Abbey is a Grade I listed 700-year-old house in Buckland Monachorum, near Yelverton, Devon, England, noted for its connection with Sir Richard Grenville the Younger and Sir Francis Drake. It is owned by the National Trust.

== Monastic history ==
Buckland Abbey was founded as a Cistercian abbey in 1278 by Amicia, Countess of Devon and was a daughter house of Quarr Abbey, on the Isle of Wight. The abbey of Quarr had close connections with the family, having been founded by Baldwin de Redvers, 1st Earl of Devon. It has been suggested that Buckland was founded as a monument to her husband, Baldwin de Redvers, 6th Earl of Devon (d. 1245) and her son, also Baldwin (d. 1262). Amicia started to make arrangements for the foundation in 1273. It was one of the last Cistercian houses founded in England and also the most westerly. The remains of the church are about 37.6 metres (123 ft) long. The width across the transepts is 28 metres (92 ft). The nave and presbytery are 10.1 metres (33 ft) wide. For its late date, the church was unusually simple, being without aisles. Most of this church survives within the present house - the arches supporting the tower can be seen in the top floor, and one of the transept chapels retains its vault. The monks would have lived in buildings around a cloister to the north of the church. These have disappeared, but the building now called Tower Cottage may have been part of the abbot's house.

The initial endowment was large - as well as the manors of Buckland, Bickleigh and Walkhampton, and the estate at Cullompton, the Exeter diocese episcopal registers show the abbey managed five granges at Buckland plus the home farm at the abbey. In total, this amounted to over 20,000 acres (8097 hectares). A market and fair at Buckland and Cullompton were granted in 1318. In 1337 King Edward III granted the monks a licence to crenellate, allowing them to fortify the abbey.

In the 15th century the monks built a Tithe Barn which is 180 feet (55 m) long and survives to this day. It is Grade I listed Another survival is a building now known as the Guest House, but probably originally 14th or 15th century stabling.

It remained an abbey until the Dissolution of the Monasteries by Henry VIII. At this time the revenues were placed at £241 17s. 9d. per annum (equivalent to £202,900 in 2025). This put it among the larger houses that survived the first wave of closures. At the eventual suppression in 1539, Abbot John Toker was given a yearly pension of £60 (equivalent to £50,300 in 2025), and the remaining twelve monks shared £54 10s. 6d.

The British Library holds the Buckland Book (BL Harley MS 2931), a 15th-century "customary" from the abbey that was acquired by the British Museum library in 1753. In 2025 it was reported that the book was found to contain a collection of plainchant that had been copied into it in the early 16th century and that would have been used by Robert Derkeham, the abbey’s choir master and organist.

=== Abbots ===
- Robert
- Galfridus ca. 1304
- Thomas ca. 1311
- William ca. 1333
- Thomas Wappelegh ca. 1356
- John Bryton 1385
- Walter ca. 1392
- Wiliam Rolff ca. 1442–1449
- John Spore 1449–1454
- John Hylle 1454–1463
- Thomas Olyver 1463–????
- John Brandon
- Thomas Whyte ca. 1511 – ca. 1528
- John Toker or Tucker 1528–1539 (afterwards Rector of St Andrew's Church, Buckland Monachorum)

== Post monastic history ==
In 1541 Henry sold Buckland to Sir Richard Grenville the Elder (Sewer of the Chamber to Henry VIII, poet, soldier, last Earl Marshal of Calais) who, working with his son Sir Roger Grenville (Gentleman of the Privy Chamber of Henry VIII, captain of the ill-fated Mary Rose), began to convert the abbey into a residence, renaming it Buckland Greynvile or Grenville. Sir Roger died in 1545 when the Mary Rose heeled over in a sudden squall while the English fleet was engaged with the French fleet in the English Channel off Portsmouth. He left a son aged 3, also named Richard Grenville, who completed the conversion in 1575–76.

After being owned by the family for 40 years, Buckland Greynvile was sold by Sir Richard the younger to two intermediaries in 1581, who unknown to Grenville, were working for Sir Francis Drake, whom he despised. By this point its value had increased to £3400.

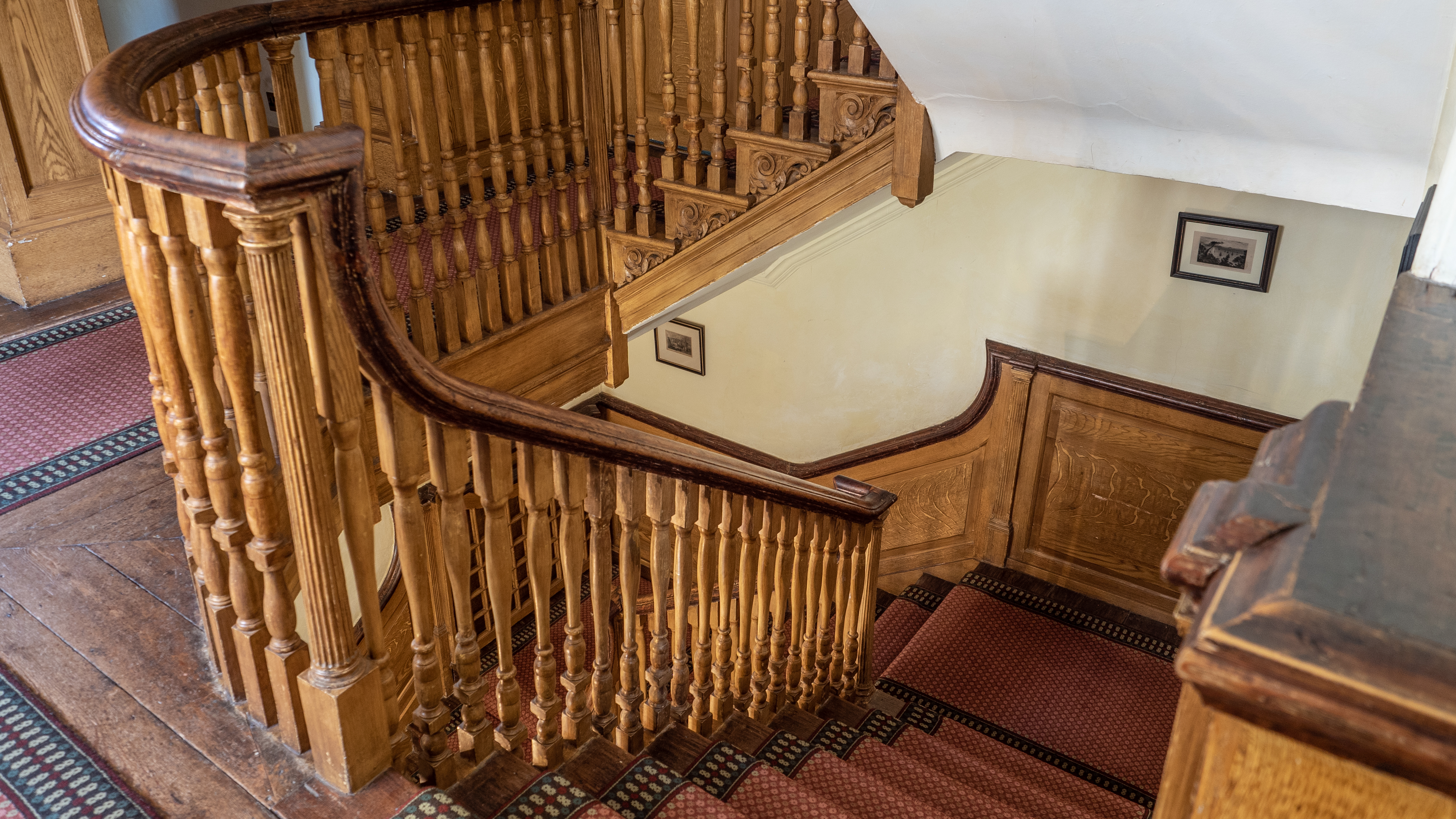
The staircase at Buckland Abbey, a former Cistercian monastery later converted into a country house.

The abbey is unusual in that the church was retained as the principal component of the new house whilst most of the remainder was demolished, which was a reversal of the normal outcome with this type of redevelopment. The main external changes were the demolition of the transepts, to let light into a central hall under the tower, and the addition of a new service wing on the south side.

Drake lived in the house for 15 years, as did many of his collateral descendants. In 1796–1801 major alterations were made, and further work was done after a fire in 1915. In the early 20th century the abbey was inhabited by the Dowager Lady Seaton, born Elisabeth Fuller-Elliot-Drake, who died on 9 May 1937. The next year, another fire devastated the house. Lady Seaton left a life interest to Captain Richard Owen Tapps Gervis Meyrick. In 1946 he sold it to Captain Arthur Rodd, who presented the property to the National Trust in 1947.

== Buckland today ==
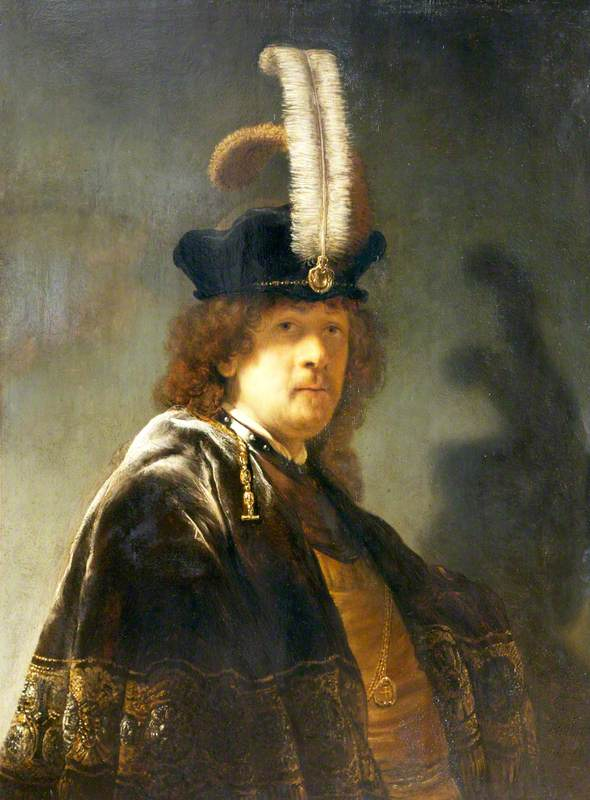
Rembrandt self-portrait in museum

Following a restoration between 1948 and 1951 which cost around £20,000 (equivalent to £550,000 in 2025), largely funded by the Pilgrim Trust the property has been open to the public since 1951 and is operated by the National Trust with the assistance of Plymouth City Council — the Plymouth City Museum and Art Gallery use the building to house part of their collection. The collection is noted for the presence of "Drake's Drum". A number of independent craft workshops are located in the converted ox sheds. The Cider House garden includes both a wild garden and a kitchen garden. There is also a medieval Great Barn next to the house.

In 2013 the portrait of a man wearing a white feathered bonnet was re-attributed to Rembrandt by the Rembrandt expert Ernst van de Wetering. In June 2014, after eight months of work at the Hamilton Kerr Institute, the painting's authenticity was confirmed and its value estimated at £30m.

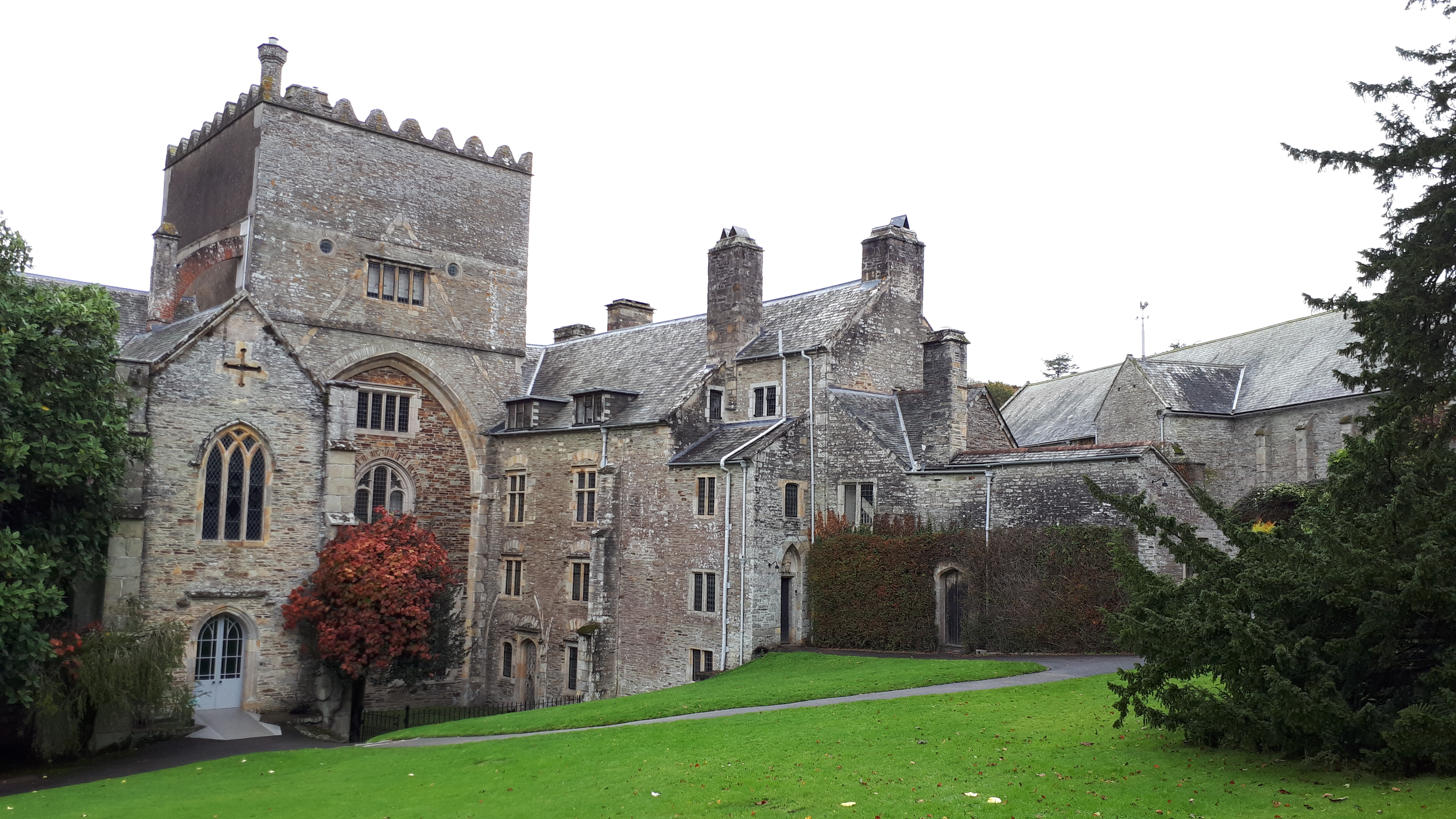
Tower

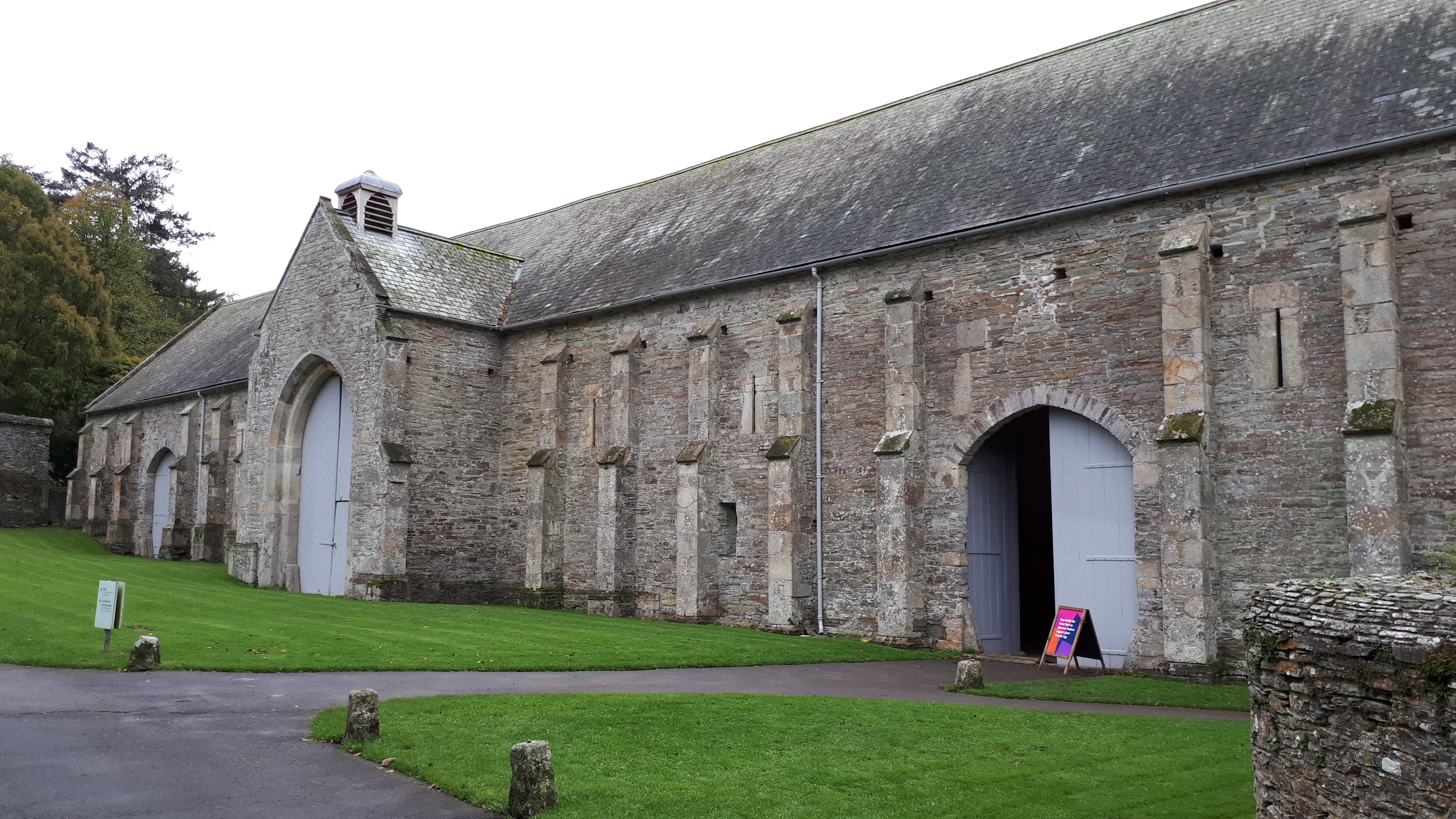
Tithe barn

== Costume Group ==
The National Trust Costume Group operate at Buckland Abbey, creating authentic Elizabethan costumes using traditional materials and methods. There is a complete Francis Drake costume, based on the famous portrait of Drake in the National Portrait Gallery, London, and the group are currently working on a costume for Lady Drake, also based on a portrait.

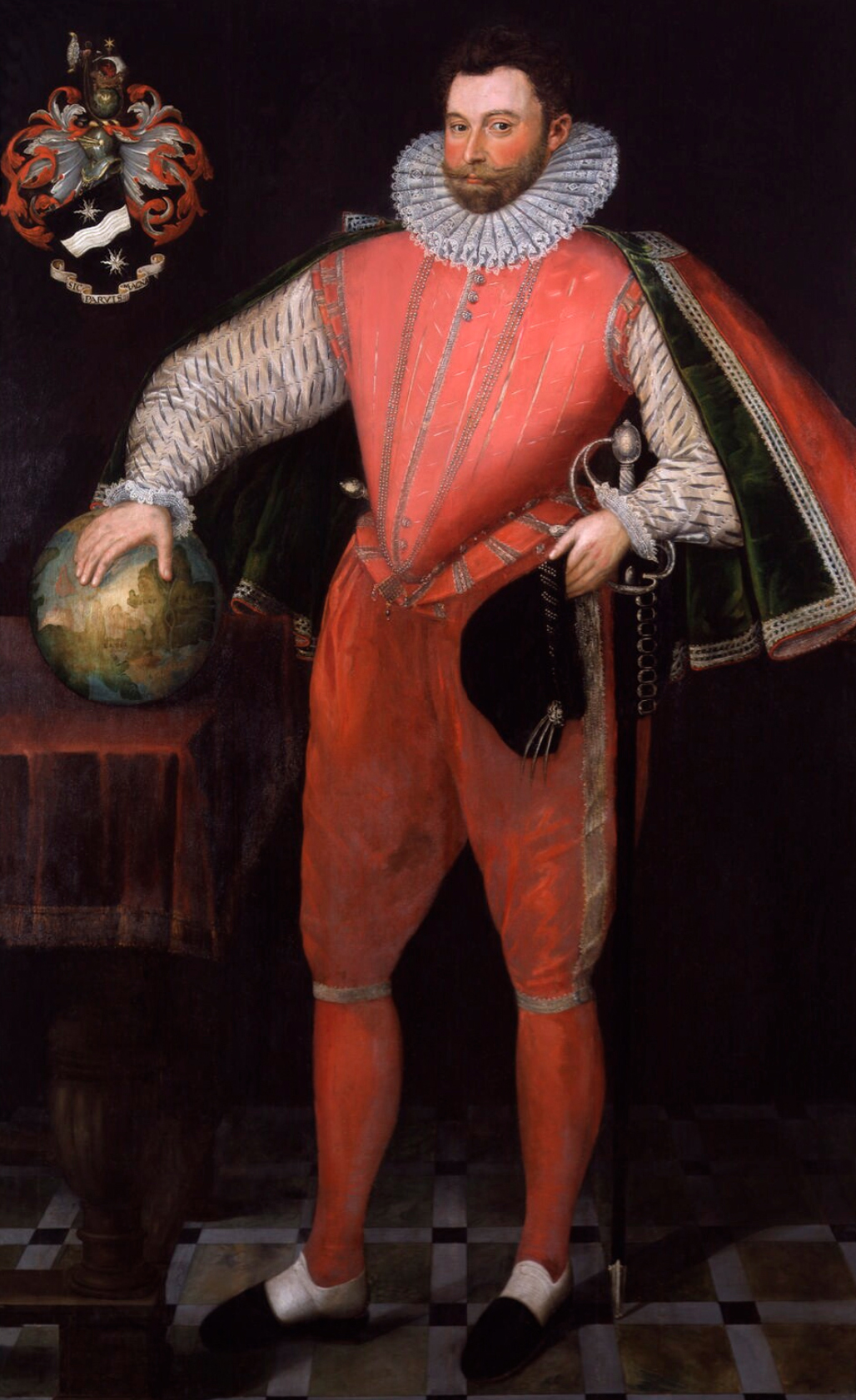
Portrait of Sir Francis Drake, National Portrait Gallery (artist unknown, c. 1580)

The completed Francis Drake Costume with Linda Bainbridge, a member of the Costume Group

== See also ==
- Drake baronets
- Fuller baronets
- Baron Seaton
- Cestui que
