= St Peter's Collegiate Church, Wolverhampton =

Parish church in Wolverhampton, England

- Collegiate Church of Saint Peter
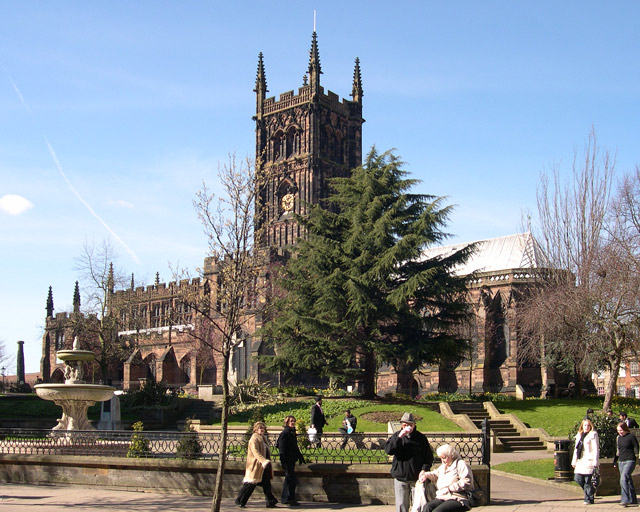
- St Peter's Collegiate Church, Wolverhampton
- OS grid reference: SO 91419 98796
- Location: Wolverhampton, West Midlands
- Country: England
- Denomination: Church of England
- Website: A Church Near You

History
- Status: Active
- Founded: 994 AD
- Founder: Wulfrun
- Dedication: Saint Peter

Architecture
- Functional status: Parish church
- Heritage designation: Grade I listed
- Designated: 16 July 1949
- Architect: Ewan Christian
- Style: Decorated Gothic; Perpendicular Gothic; Gothic Revival
- Completed: 1865

Administration
- Province: Canterbury
- Diocese: Lichfield
- Archdeaconry: Walsall
- Deanery: Wolverhampton
- Parish: Central Wolverhampton

Clergy
- Rector: Rev Canon Jeremy Dussek

St Peter's Collegiate Church is a Church of England parish church located in Wolverhampton, England. Its origins are traditionally associated with Wulfrun's endowment of a minster at Wolverhampton in 994 AD. For many centuries St Peter's Church was a Chapel Royal and, from 1480, a royal peculiar, independent of the Diocese of Lichfield and the Province of Canterbury. In 1848 it was integrated into the diocesan structure and now serves the parish of Central Wolverhampton.

The church building, which is Grade I listed on the National Heritage List for England, is predominantly medieval in origin, built during the 14th and 15th centuries in Gothic style. However, the chancel was rebuilt in Gothic Revival style in the 19th century. It stands within St Peter's Gardens, which now occupy the former churchyard.

St Peter's maintains an established choral tradition, with separate boys' and girls' choirs, lay clerks and choral scholars, following the tradition of English cathedral music. The church has a Father Willis organ built in 1860, which was fully restored between 2018 and 2019.

== History ==
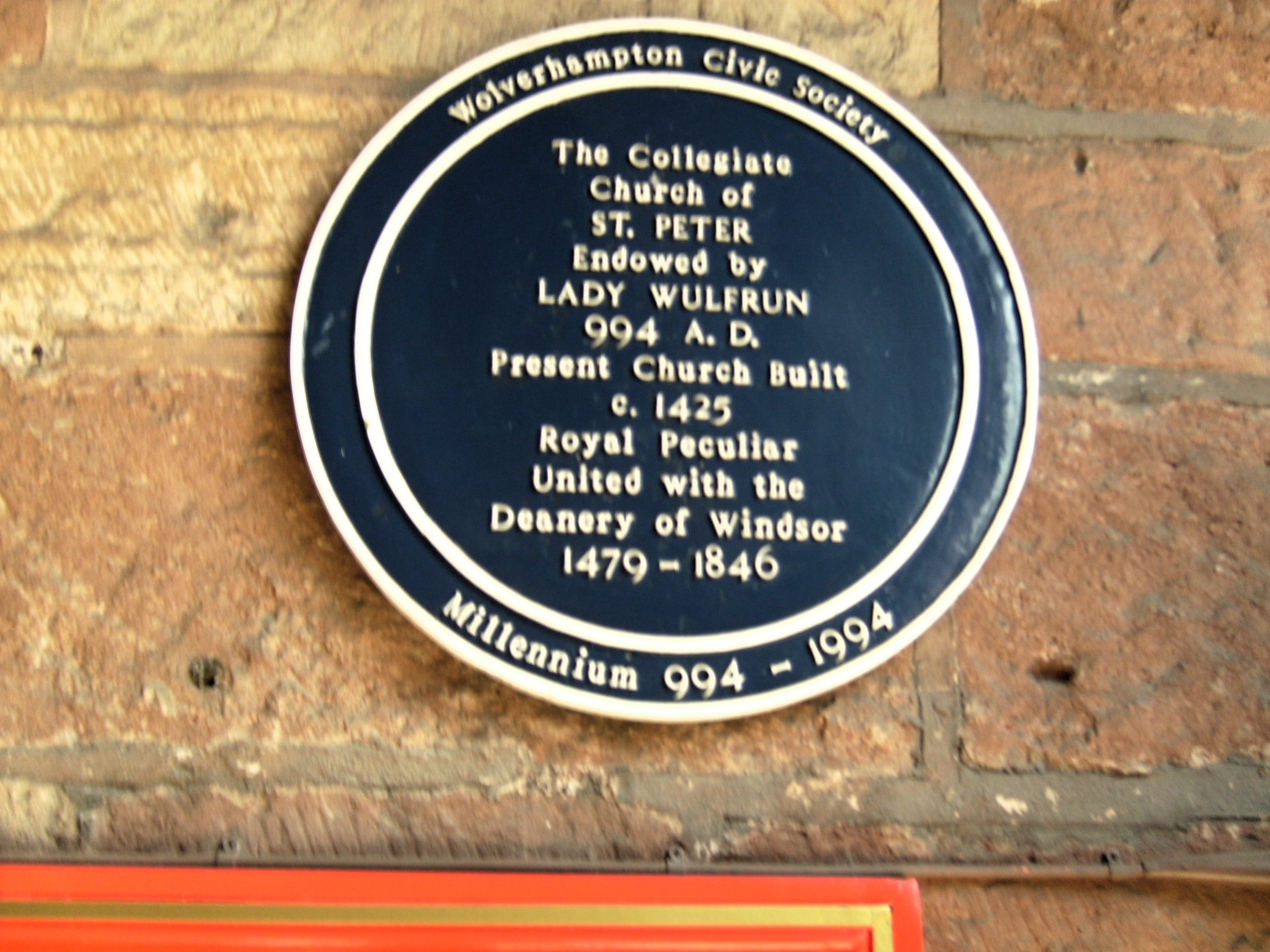
A Wolverhampton Civic Society blue plaque in the south porch summarises the history of the church.

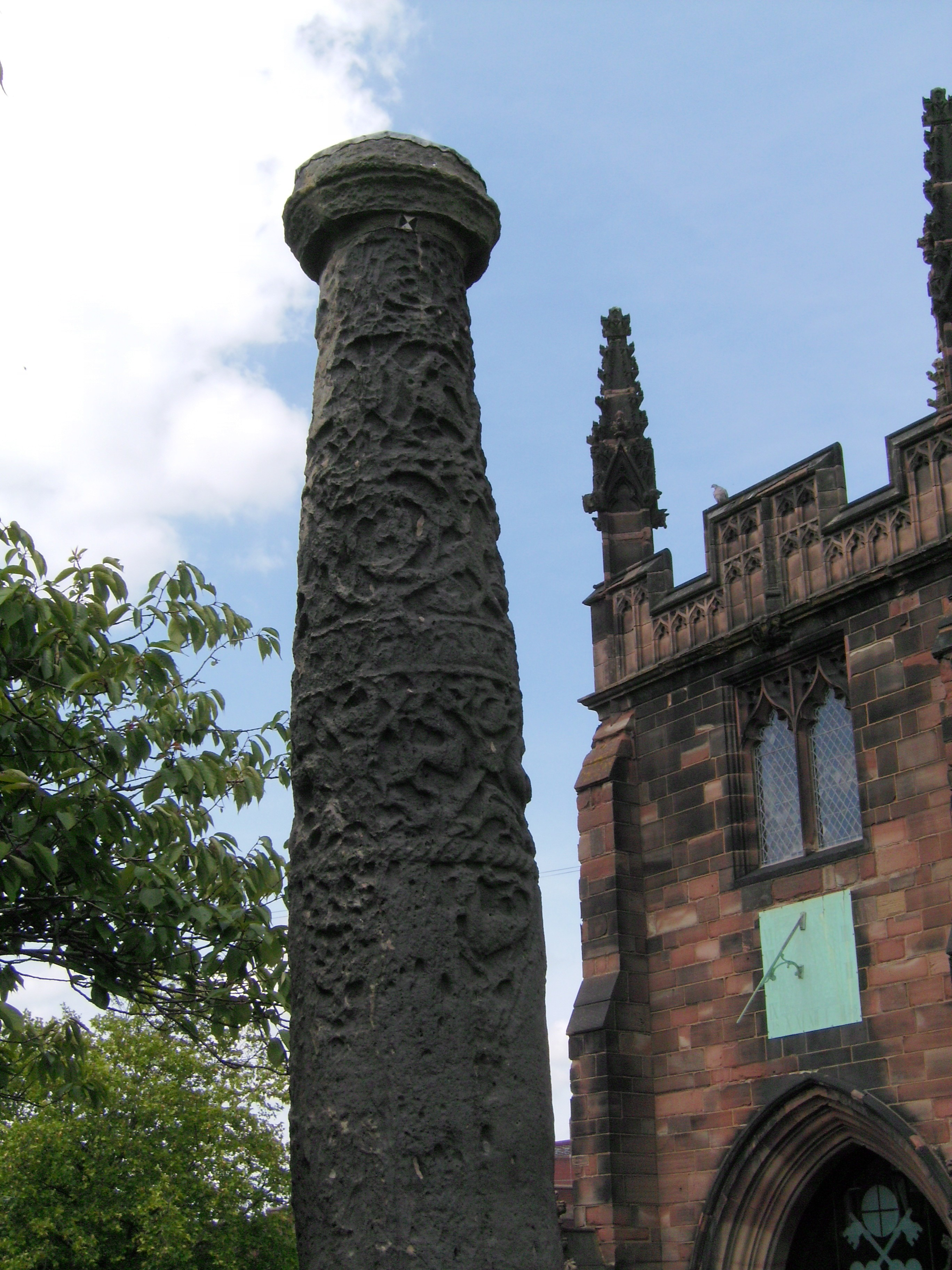
Shaft of Anglo-Saxon cross, attributed to the 9th century, to the south of the church. Although often said to belong to an early Mercian monastery on the site, there is no evidence of such a building. The cross is as likely to have been a preaching cross from the period before the church existed.

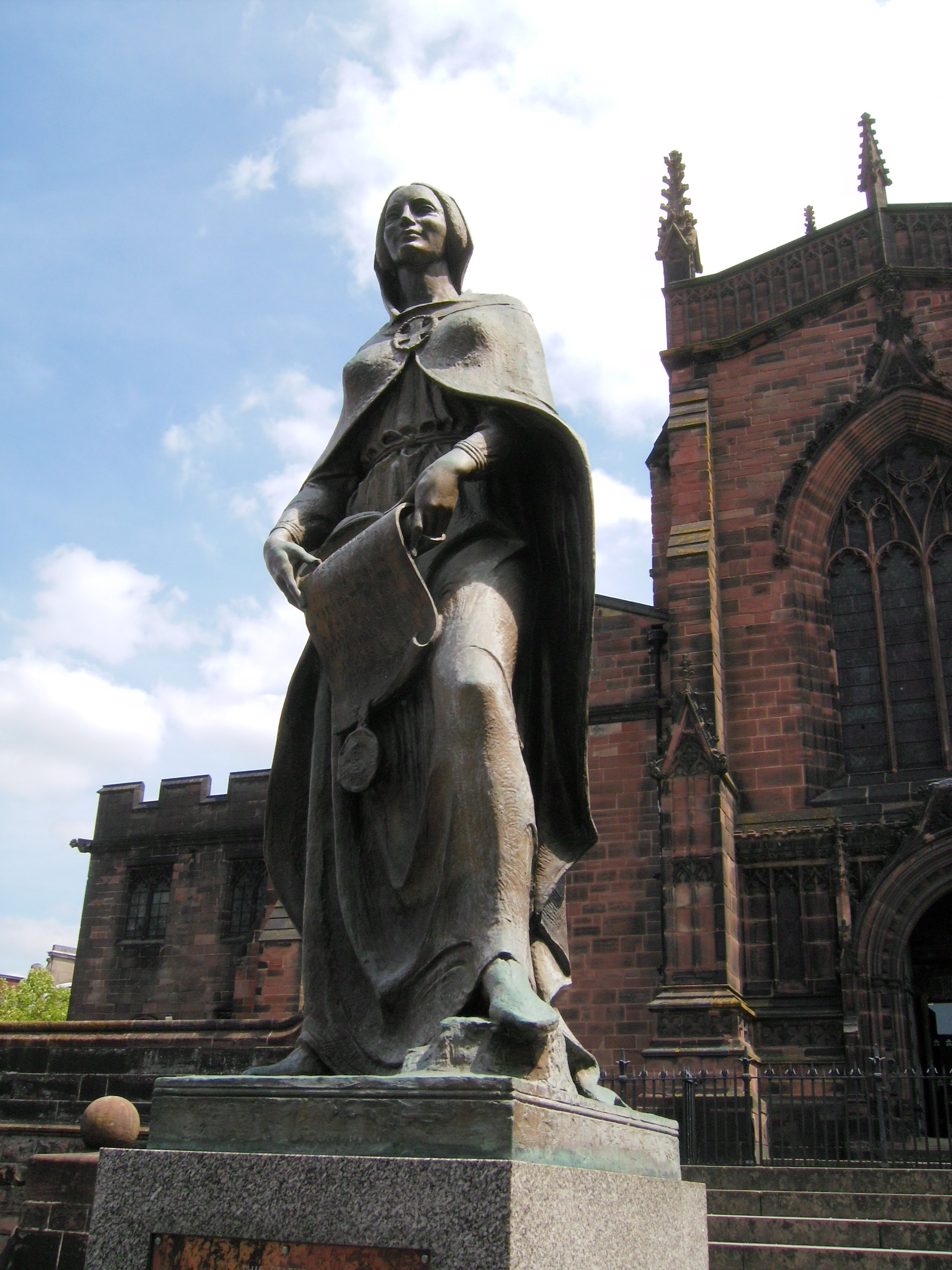
Statue of Wulfrun bearing her charter, on the church steps, by Charles Wheeler

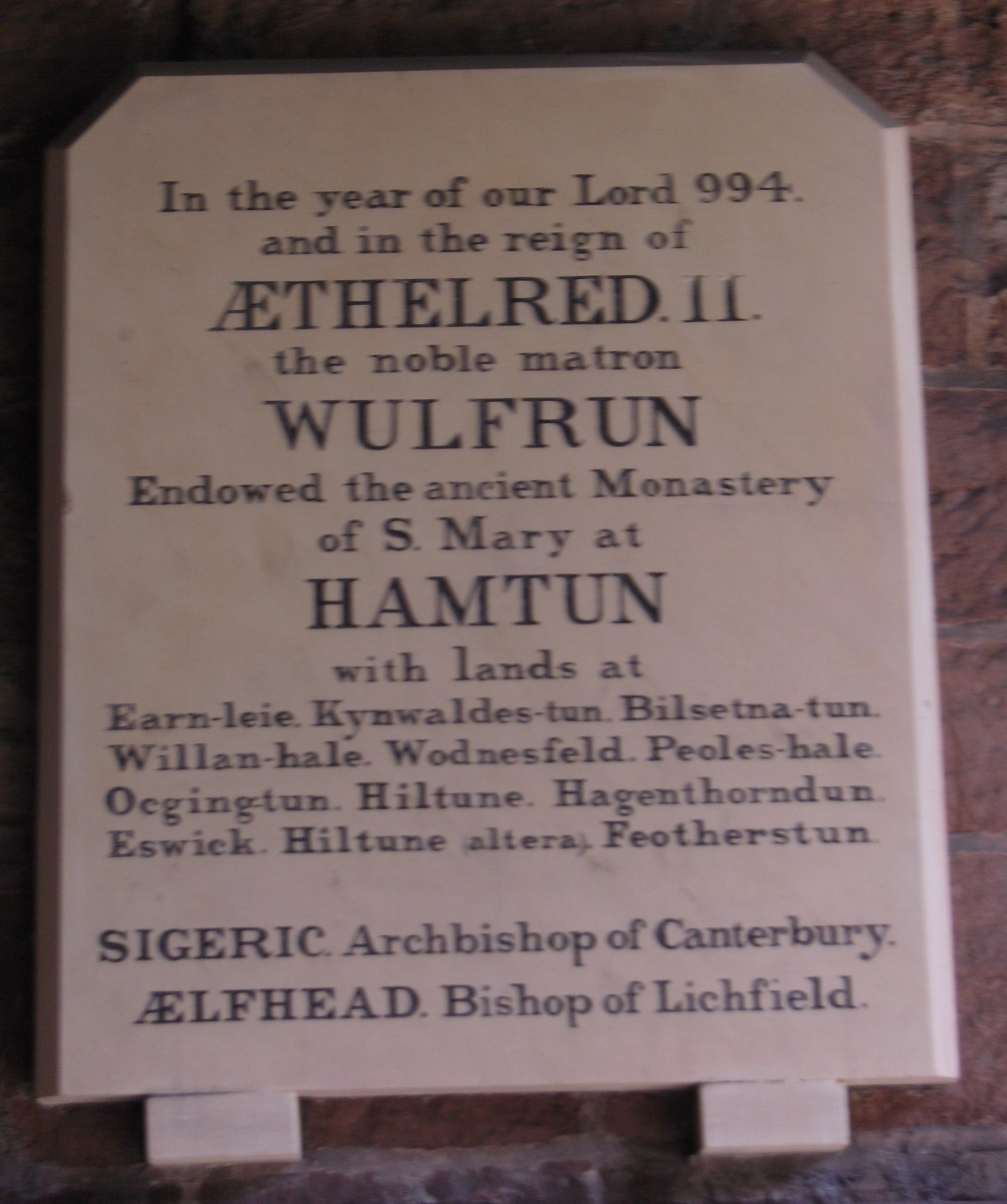
Tablet commemorating Wulfrun's bequest in the south porch

St Peter's is an Anglo-Saxon foundation. The history of St Peter's was dominated for centuries by its collegiate status, from the 12th century constituted as a dean and prebendaries, and by its royal connections, which were crystallised in the form of the royal peculiar in 1480. Although a source of pride and prosperity to both town and church, this institutional framework, hard-won and doggedly defended, made the church subject to the whims of the monarch or governing elite and unresponsive to the needs of its people. Characterised by absenteeism and corruption through most of its history, the college was involved in constant political and legal strife, and it was dissolved and restored a total of three times, before a fourth and final dissolution in 1846-8 cleared the way for St Peter's to become an active urban parish church and the focus of civic pride.

=== 994–1066: Origins and endowments ===
==== Wulfrun's charter ====
There is some doubt about the origins of the College of Wolverhampton. The most important item of evidence is a charter, alleged by an anonymous history of the Diocese of Lichfield to have been discovered around 1560 in ruderibus muri, "in the ruins of a wall." The story of its discovery and its subsequent disappearance has cast doubt on the authenticity of the charter. It is known from a transcription made by William Dugdale in 1640, when the original was in the library at St George's Chapel, Windsor Castle, and included in his famous survey, Monasticon Anglicanum. Sigeric, Archbishop of Canterbury, confirms Lady Wulfrun's endowment of a Minster at Hampton. The original grant by Wulfrun, partly Latin and partly Old English, is quoted in the charter. A translation begins:

I, Wulfrun, do grant to the proper patron and high-throned King of Kings, and (in honour of) the everlasting Virgin mother of God, Mary, and of all the saints, for the body of my husband, and of my soul, ten hides of land, to that aforesaid monastery of the servants of God there, and in another convenient place another ten hides for the offences of Wulfgeat my kinsman lest he should hear in the judgment to be dreaded from the severe Judge, "Go away from me, I hungered and thirsted," and so on. Because he is blessed who shall eat bread in the kingdom of God. Finally now my sole daughter, Elfthryth, has migrated from the world to the life-giving airs. For the third time I have granted 10 hides to the almighty God, with ineffable charity, more willingly than the others (Which are surrounded by these territories). These are the boundaries of the land that Wulfrun has given to the minster in Hamtun and the names of the towns that this privilegium refers to:

First of Earn-leie and Eswick and Bilsetna-tun and Willan-hale and Wodnesfeld and Peoleshale and Ocgingtun and Hiltun and Hagenthorndun and Kynwaldes-tun (Kinvaston) and another Hiltune and Feotherstun.

The charter then defines the boundaries of the estates given by Wulfrun in considerable detail. Some of the places named are fairly easy to recognise from their modern or medieval forms: Arley, Bilston, Willenhall, Wednesfield, Pelsall, Ogley Hay, Hilton, Hatherton, Kinvaston, Featherstone. Others raise problems. These were discussed in the notes to a collection of Anglo-Saxon charters prepared for publication by C. G. O. Bridgeman in 1916, and his conclusions have been generally accepted. These include the identification of Eswick as Ashwood, Staffordshire, as it was Haswic in the Domesday Book, and of the second Hilton as a village of that name near Ogley and Wall, Staffordshire. The ten hides of land at Wolverhampton were probably those which Wulfrun herself had received from Ethelred II by a charter of 985. These were specified as ix uidelicet in loco qui dicitur aet Heantune, et aeque unam manentem in eo loco quae Anglice aet Treselcotum uocitatur ("nine plainly in the place which is called Hampton and equally the remaining one in the place called by the English Trescott"): the latter is a place on the River Smestow to the west of Wolverhampton. The Arley lands probably came from a grant which King Edgar the Peaceful had made to Wulfgeat, a relative of Wulfrun, in 963. In 1548, before the alleged discovery of Wulfrun's charter, Edgar himself was generally accepted as the founder of the College. Wulfgeat was an important adviser to Ethelred, a king who proverbially, as the Unready or Redeless, did not accept good advice: he fell into disgrace and Wulfrun's grants were partly to make amends for his perceived injustices. When Wulfgeat died in about 1006, he left four oxen to the church at Heantune.

==== Heantun church ====
The church was originally dedicated to St Mary and this was still the dedication at the Domesday survey: It was switched to St Peter, probably in the mid-12th century: an escheator's inquisition in 1393 recalled that it was still St Mary's when Henry I (1100–35) granted a small estate to set up a chantry for himself and his parents. It seems likely that the College always consisted of secular clergy —priests who did not belong to a religious order, rather than monks. A writ attributed to King Edward the Confessor (1042–1066) refers to the College as "my priests at Hampton." Although the document is known to be a forgery, probably dating from a century later, the secular character of the chapter seems to have been accepted unchallenged, despite the implication in the foundation charter that it might be a monastery. All of the Domesday entries relating to the church of Wolverhampton refer to clergy, canons or priests, never monks. There is no evidence that a monastery ever existed at Wolverhampton.

A college was not originally an educational institution but rather a body of people with a shared purpose, in this case a community of priests charged with pastoral care over a wide and wild area. Wulfruna's was far from unique, even in its locality. The collegiate church of St Michael at nearby Penkridge pre-dated Wulfruna's church, probably by about half a century. Frank Stenton pointed out that Old English word mynster was often used as a word for churches served by such communities of priests and does not necessarily indicate that a community was made up of monks, although it is derived from the Latin monasterium. Rather than conventional parishes, substantial areas in Anglo-Saxon England were served by groups of priests who replicated the bishop's cathedral chapter in which they had been trained by working in community. These were generally not monastic houses in the full sense. Ethelred II did decree clerical celibacy for such bodies, in an effort them more monastic in character, but without success. Richard A. Fletcher noted that in this period of renewed Viking activity there were numerous "communities of clergy at which reformers looked askance but which very probably made a significant if unobtrusive contribution to the Christianization of Anglo-Scandinavian England." In some cases, like that of Ripon Cathedral, former monasteries were revived as collegiate churches. At least one, Stow Minster in Lincolnshire, benefited greatly from the generosity of another Mercian noblewoman, Godgifu or Lady Godiva. Wulfrun's foundation belonged firmly in this wave of lay foundations. By Domesday Wolverhampton and Penkridge had been joined by St Mary's Church, Stafford and St Michael's at Tettenhall.

=== 1066–1135: Norman conquest and its consequences ===
It is not clear when the College began to have a close connection with the Crown, although this was to become a defining characteristic, which shaped much of its history. The forged letter of Edward the Confessor is meant to point to just such a close relationship, but we know it dates from a century later, after the church had Wolverhampton had passed through a series of difficulties which it probably wanted to resolve permanently. Some of these stemmed from the Norman Conquest, which brought considerable disruption to Staffordshire's collegiate churches. Wolverhampton's was given by William the Conqueror to his own personal chaplain, Samson.

W. rex Anglorum L. archiepiscopo et G. episcopo Constant et P. episcopo et R. vicecomiti ceterisque suis fidelibus de Estaffordscire salutem. Sciatis me dedisse Sampsoni capellano meo ecclesiam Sancte Marie de Wolvrenehamptonia, cum terra et omnibus aliis rebus et consuetudinibus, sicut melius predicta ecclesia habuit tempore regis Edwardi.

Translation:

William I King of the English greets Archbishop L(anfranc) and G(osfrid), Bishop of Coutances, and P(eter), Bishop (of Lichfield) and R(obert) the sheriff and the other lieges of Staffordshire. Know that I [the King] have given to Samson his chaplain the church of Saint Mary of Wolverhampton with the land and all the things and customs which the aforesaid church had in the time of King Edward.

The following table summarises information in the Domesday Book relating to locations that were or had been holdings of the canons of Wolverhampton. The information is derived from the relevant facsimile page at Open Domesday and the translation at the University of Hull's Hydra Repository.

Lands at Domesday
Phillimore reference no.	Location	Ploughlands	Lord in 1066	Tenant-in-chief 1087	Slaves	Villeins	Smallholders	Free men	Approximate geographical reference
STS 7,1	Wolverhampton	3	Canons of Wolverhampton	Samson the chaplain	14	6	30		52°35′13″N 2°07′41″W
STS 7,2	Upper Arley	6	Canons of Wolverhampton	Canons of Wolverhampton	2	7	3	3	52°25′16″N 2°20′38″W
STS 7,2	Arley	1	Canons of Wolverhampton	Canons of Wolverhampton but Osbern Fitz Richard had taken it by force		4			52°25′16″N 2°20′38″W
STS 7,3	Bushbury	½	Wulfric	William Fitz-Ansculf				1	52°37′12″N 2°06′51″W
STS 7,4	Trescott	½	Canons of Wolverhampton	Canons of Wolverhampton				1	52°34′08″N 2°13′21″W
STS 7,5	Tettenhall	2½	Edward the Confessor	William the Conqueror, who had given its as a free grant to Tettenhall church		1	3		52°35′55″N 2°09′45″W
STS 7,6	Ashwood, Staffordshire	8, but waste because part of the royal forest	Canons of Wolverhampton	Canons of Wolverhampton					52°29′18″N 2°11′46″W
STS 7,7	Wednesfield	3	Canons of Wolverhampton	Canons of Wolverhampton		6	6		52°35′59″N 2°05′01″W
STS 7,8	Willenhall	1	Canons of Wolverhampton	Canons of Wolverhampton		3	5		52°35′03″N 2°03′00″W
STS 7,9	Pelsall	1 but waste	Canons of Wolverhampton	Canons of Wolverhampton					52°37′32″N 1°58′16″W
STS 7,10	Hilton	1	Canons of Wolverhampton	Canons of Wolverhampton	2		4		52°38′54″N 1°52′51″W
STS 7,11	Ogley Hay	Waste	Canons of Wolverhampton	Canons of Wolverhampton					52°38′52″N 1°55′30″W
STS 7,12	Hatherton	2	Canons of Wolverhampton	Samson the chaplain, who let the land to the priests Edwin and Alric	1	3	7	Man-at-arms	52°41′24″N 2°03′57″W
STS 7,13	Kinvaston	1	Canons of Wolverhampton	Canons of Wolverhampton	3		3		52°42′32″N 2°08′10″W
STS 7,15	Hilton	2	Canons of Wolverhampton	Canons of Wolverhampton	1		1	1	52°38′47″N 2°04′29″W
STS 7,15	Featherstone	Waste	Canons of Wolverhampton	Canons of Wolverhampton					52°38′56″N 2°05′57″W
STS 12,1	Sedgley	Woodland	Ælfgar, Earl of Mercia	William Fitz-Ansculf					52°32′41″N 2°07′42″W
WOR 13,1	Lutley	?	Canons of Wolverhampton	Canons of Wolverhampton	2	2	1		52°26′46″N 2°05′18″W
STS 1,4	Bilston	4	King Edward	King William		8	3		52°34′00″N 2°04′31″W

Domesday shows a variable situation of retreat and advance for the canons of Wolverhampton. They no longer held Wolverhampton itself as tenants-in-chief but as tenants of Samson. No holdings of the canons are mentioned at Bilston, either before of after the Conquest: the whole of Bilston now belonged to the king himself. Other lands he had let out to other priests: certainly Hatherton, although the Victoria County History includes, while Open Domesday does not, Kinvaston, Hilton and Featherstone. At Arley, some of their land had been seized forcibly by one Osbern Fitz Richard. On the other hand, even before the Conquest, they had acquired an estate at Lutley, Worcestershire, and they claimed woodland at Sedgeley: neither of these was in Wulfrun's grant.

At Wolverhampton, the canons' land was cultivated by 14 slaves, alongside 36 other peasants. The church also had slaves at Upper Arley. The expansion of the royal forests, hunting grounds for the king and his retainers, had hit the region hard and Wolverhampton was almost surrounded, with the Forest of Kinver up to its southern edge, and the Forest of Brewood and Cannock Chase to the north. This took substantial areas out of agricultural production, making them almost valueless to the canons: there were five hides at Ashwood now subsumed into the Forest of Kinver, for example. Despite the direct royal patronage and the close attention of the royal chaplain, the Conquest had brought considerable setbacks for the canons.

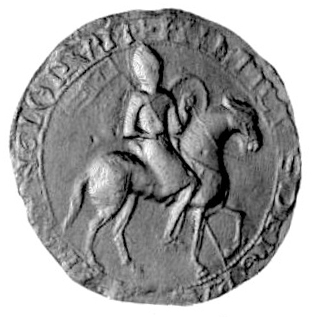
Seal of Henry I, an important benefactor of St Peter's

Samson was elected Bishop of Worcester on 8 June 1096. He may have been previously in only minor orders, as he had to be ordained a priest the day before his consecration. He became notorious, despite his vow of clerical celibacy, as the father of at least three children, two of whom later became bishops. During the reign of Henry I, he donated the church at Wolverhampton to his cathedral priory at Worcester, although its lands and privileges were protected. Henry I himself made a very substantial grant to Wolverhampton church to establish his chantry there: a house with forty acres of land and rents worth £20 a year.

=== 1135–89: Anarchy and after ===
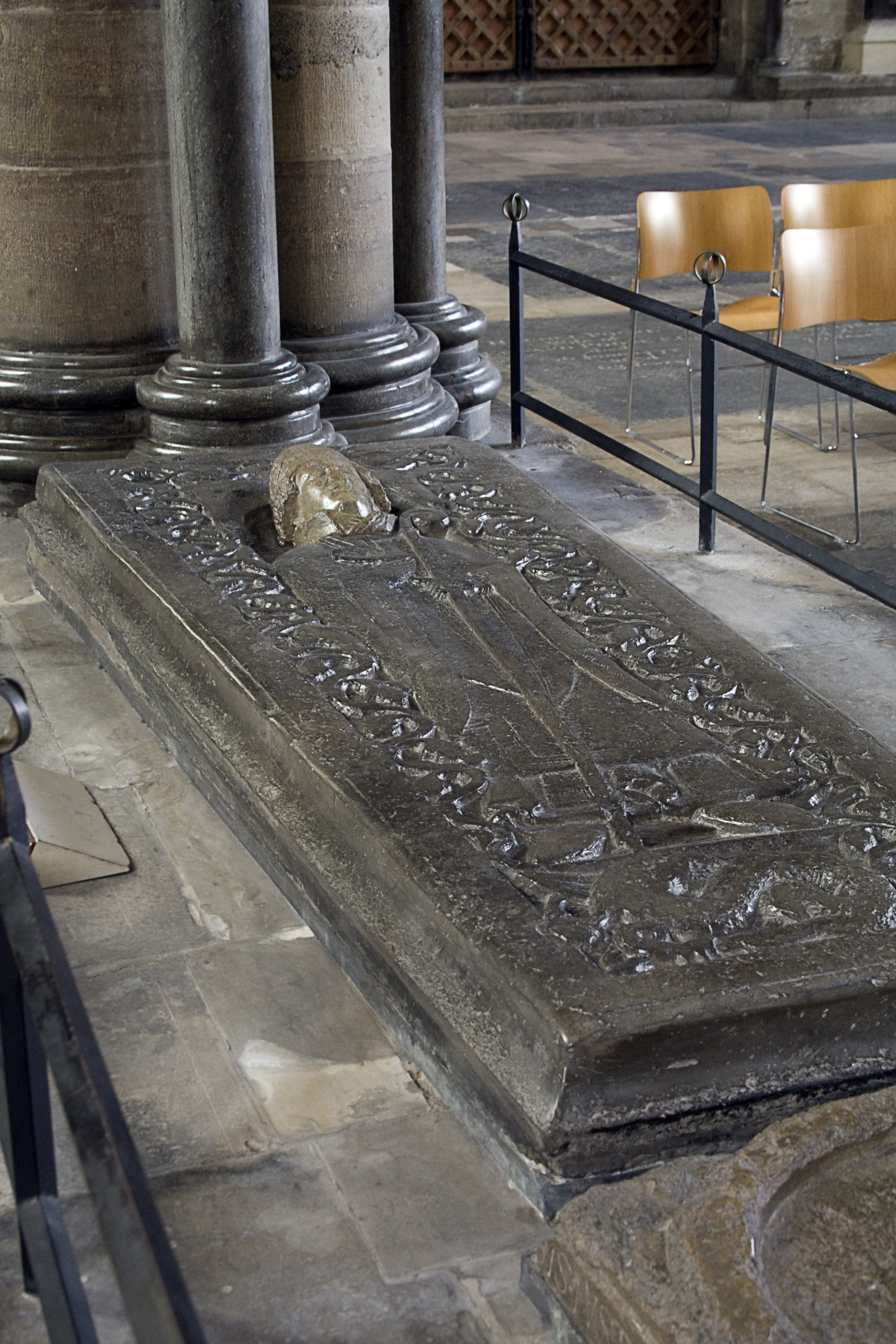
Tomb in Salisbury Cathedral, thought to be that of Roger of Salisbury

However, The Anarchy, the confused civil strife of King Stephen's reign, brought great challenges. First the church was seized by Bishop Roger of Salisbury. Roger had risen to be Lord Chancellor and Henry I's chief minister and had vowed to support the succession of the Empress Matilda, Henry I's daughter and chosen heir. He broke his word on Henry's death, citing her marriage to Geoffrey Plantagenet, Count of Anjou, as justification. His support was initially crucial in allowing Stephen to consolidate his rule after his coup d'état of 1135, and he used his influence to extend his property, building a powerful political clique that included his nephews, Nigel, Bishop of Ely and Alexander, Bishop of Lincoln. Stephen felt threatened by his over-mighty Chancellor and moved against him on 24 October 1139. Provoked into a brawl at the king's court at Oxford, Roger and his family were disgraced and dispossessed. He lost the church at Wolverhampton and its lands, along with much else, and died in December. At Oxford, in 1139 or 1140, Stephen granted Wolverhampton church to Roger de Clinton, described as Bishop of Chester and Lichfield Cathedral. He also issued a writ of intendence, calling on all the clergy, laity and tenants to transfer their loyalty to Bishop Roger.

The canons were outraged at this betrayal of trust, which left them at the mercy of a powerful magnate in their own vicinity, and appealed to Pope Eugenius III. It is notable that around this time the dedication was changed to St Peter, which would be a flattering move in negotiations with Rome. Occasionally thereafter it was described as the Church of St Peter and St Paul. Whatever dedication is given, the church's seals generally picture both saints. Despite the briefness of the interlude under Lichfield, the impact of Bishop Roger de Clinton and his chapter of secular clergy at Lichfield may have been considerable. The diocese had three centres: Coventry, Chester and Lichfield. As the other centres were so heavily involved in the military action of Stephen's reign, it seems that Clinton gave renewed emphasis to the religious role of Lichfield, re-establishing it as the headquarters of his see. It seems that he reorganised Lichfield's chapter on a prebendal model in order to counterbalance the monastic chapter at Coventry and using Rouen Cathedral as his model. At some time in the mid-12th century, probably under the control of Lichfield, Wolverhampton was reorganised along similar lines, with a dean and prebendaries. King Stephen restored Wolverhampton church to Worcester priory by 1152, perhaps as early as 1144. In his concession, he described himself as prius inconsulte – previously ill-advised.

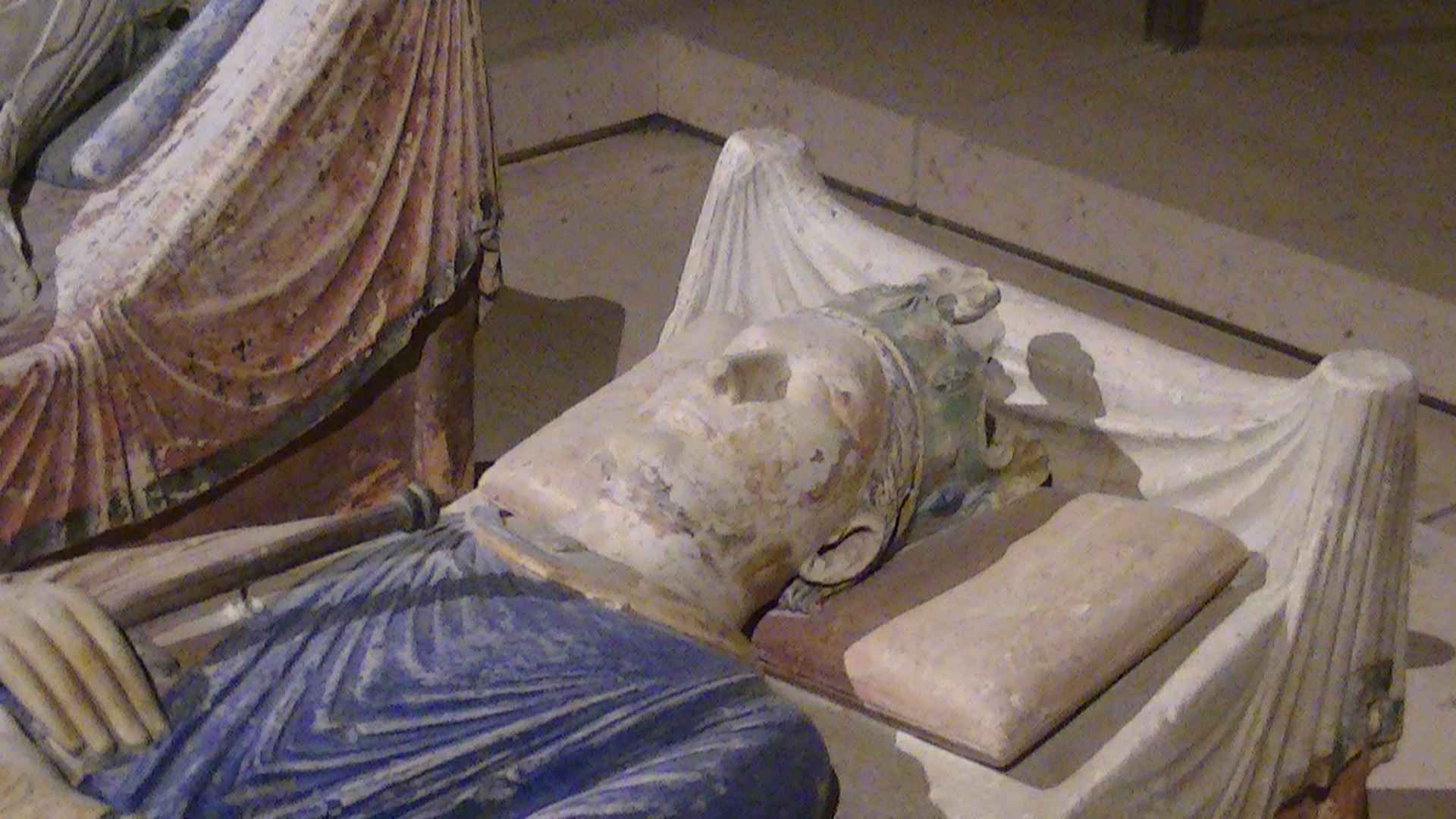
Effigy of Henry II at Fontevraud Abbey

Stephen was forced to agree that he would be succeeded by Matilda's son, Henry Plantagenet, at that time already Duke of Normandy and Duke of Aquitaine. Even before he succeeded to the throne, Henry issued a charter in which he described the church at Wolverhampton as "my chapel", restored all its privileges from the time of Henry I, and recognised it as free from secular taxation.

H., dux Normannorum et Aquitanorum, et cornes Andegavorum, omnibus archiepiscopis, episcopis, comitibus, baronibus, justiciis, vicecomitibus, et omnibus amicis et fidelibus suis Normannis et Anglis, salutem.

Sciatis me concessisse ecclesie de Wlvronehamptona, capelle mee, omnem illam libertatem quam habuit in tempore H. regis, avi mei, et omnem illam quietanciam in bosco et plano, in pratis et pascuis, in aquis et extra, in viis et semitis et omnibus locis; et canonicis ejusdem ecclesie eandem concedo libertatem et quietanciam. Quare mando et firmiter precipio ut eadem ecclesia, capella mea, libera sit et quieta ab omnibus consuetudinibus et exactionibus cum omnibus pertinentiis suis, et canonici omnia sua libere et quiete possideant, ne quis eis dampnum vel molestiam vel injuriam aliquam facere presumat.

Testibus: Rogero comite Herefordie, Waltero fratre suo constabulario, Henrico fratre suo, Gervasio Paganell. germano. Apud Dudeleg.

Translation:

Henry, duke of Normandy and Aquitaine, count of Anjou, greets all archbishops, bishops, earls, barons, justices, sheriffs, and all his Norman and English friends and lieges.

Know that I have given to the church at Wolverhampton, my chapel, all that liberty and immunity it had in the time of King Henry, my grandfather, in woods and level land, in meadows and pastures, in waters and outside them, on roads and pathways, and all places; and to the canons of this same church I grant these liberties and immunities. By the same token, I order and strongly enjoin that this same church, my chapel, be free of all customs and taxes and all they imply, and that all its canons occupy it freely and safely, without threat of loss, harassment or injury.

Witnessed by: Roger, Earl of Hereford; Walter, his brother, the Constable; Henry, his brother; Gevase Pagnell, his close friend. At Dudley.

As soon as he came to the throne in 1154 as Henry II, he issued another charter recognising the right of the canons to hold a manorial court. Neither of these charters explicitly stated Wolverhampton was not subject to the jurisdiction of the Bishop of Lichfield, but the king had clearly asserted a special relationship with the Crown, recognising the church at Wolverhampton as a royal chapel. It was probably Henry II who appointed Peter of Blois as Dean of Wolverhampton: he is the first dean whose name is known. Peter was a Latin poet, lawyer and a diplomat of considerable experience. He had been tutor to William II of Sicily, one of the most cultivated rulers of his time, and Henry had brought him into his circle of close supporters when he was under extreme pressure because of the murder of Thomas Becket and ruptures in the royal family. It is not clear when Peter was appointed to the position at Wolverhampton, but he outlived his royal patron, entering a period of relative disfavour under Richard I.

=== 1189–1224: Dissolution and restoration ===
By the time Peter of Blois was appointed, the College was organised as a community of prebendaries, headed by a dean. Peter seems to have taken little interest in his Wolverhampton deanery until after the death of Henry II: he had numerous other benefices and was heavily involved in Archbishop Baldwin's prolonged feud with his own cathedral chapter, spending a year away, arguing Baldwin's case at the Papal Curia in 1187-88.

The earliest extant evidence of any interest Wolverhampton is a letter he wrote to the Chancellor, William Longchamp, to denounce the “tyranny of the Sheriff of Stafford” who was, he complained, trampling on the church's ancient privileges and oppressing the townspeople. The letter was well-calculated to win sympathy, as the sheriff was Hugh Nonant, Bishop of Coventry, an enemy of Longchamp because he supported the Prince John, the regent. It must have been written in 1190-1, as Longchamp's ascendancy dates from mid-1190 and he was forced to leave the country in October 1191. Although he championed the church against outsiders, Peter considered the prebendaries corrupt. He wrote a stinging rebuke to Robert of Shrewsbury who held one of the Wolverhampton prebends and sought to retain it after he was elected Bishop of Bangor.

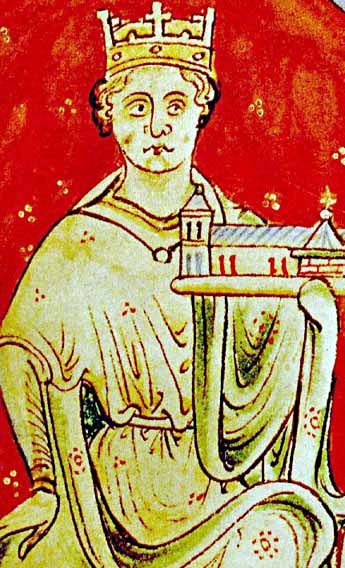
King John from a medieval manuscript of Historia Anglorum

Around 1202, Peter resigned his post and put forward a revolutionary plan from outside. In a letter to Pope Innocent III, Peter denounced the college as composed of a clique, so closely and notoriously intermarried that no-one was able to prise them apart. As they were incorrigible, a complete reform was necessary. With the assent of the Archbishop of Canterbury and the king, a Cistercian monastery could be established, as the area abounded in the woods, meadows and waters needed by this ascetic French order dedicated to a radical and literal interpretation of the Benedictine Rule. Peter did persuade Archbishop Hubert Walter and King John of the advantages of his plan and it received royal assent early in 1203. It appears that John had already appointed one Nicholas to the deanery, left vacant by Peter's resignation. This Nicholas appeared as Dean of Wolverhampton when he was taken to court in September 1203 by Elias Fitz Philip in a property case involving an estate at Kinvaston. Shortly afterwards, he appears in court again, shorn of his title, as plain Nicholas de Hamton, and later again under the same designation, when it is specified that the dispute is over one virgate of land. It appears that this marks his loss of the deanery, in line with the king's decision to wind up the college of Wolverhampton..

Early in 1204 John transferred the deanery and prebends to the archbishop in order for him to establish a monastery, which should pray for souls of the king and his ancestors after death, as well as in their lifetimes. He dispensed with Forest law and exactions for these properties. On 28 July 1204 John also granted the manor of Wolverhampton: his charter suggests that there were already Cistercian monks waiting there in readiness. On 31 May 1205 at Portchester John granted the vill of Tettenhall. These were additional to the deanery and prebends and represented a further level of security in possession of the estates: the Pipe rolls show that in 1203/4 Hubert Walter had already drawn an income of 20 shillings per quarter or £4 a year from Tettenhall, while in 1204/5 he received the same from Tettenhall (but in three instalments) and 33 shillings quarterly or £6 12s. for the year from Wolverhampton. On 1 June 1205, still at Portchester, John issued a charter transferring to Archbishop Hubert woodland at Kingsley in Kinver Forest, which was close to Tettenhall, this time specifying that it was for the construction of a Cistercian monastery: once again, it was dispensed from Forest law and customs. John also had a full charter drafted, granting in perpetual alms "the deanery, prebends and whole manor of Wolverhampton, the wood of Kingsley and the vill of Tettenhall and all their parts." The scheme also received the reforming Innocent III's approval, which was still in force when Archbishop Hubert Walter died on 13 July 1205.

Immediately everything was reversed. The draft charter of liberties was marked as cancelled because of archbishop's death. John had changed his mind completely and on 5 August 1205, only three weeks after the archbishop's death, he appointed a replacement dean of Wolverhampton: Henry, the son of his Chief Justiciar, Geoffrey Fitz Peter, 1st Earl of Essex. Abandoning any pretence of reform, the terms of Henry's appointment specified that he was to hold the deanery with its liberties and honours exactly as his predecessors. Well-connected to all the centres of power in the kingdom, he seems to have held the post of dean for nearly two decades. It is often claimed that the new church was begun early in the 13th century, probably during the interregnum, meaning that it would have been constructed largely under Henry. However, the building's Historic England listing now suggests that the earliest part of the present building, the crossing and south transept, date from the late 13th century.

=== 1224–1300: Disputes and prosperity ===
==== Giles de Erdington ====
Giles of Erdington, who became Dean of St Peter's around 1224, was a talented lawyer and was already set on a career that would make him one of Henry III's most eminent judges, a Justice of the Common Bench. He soon seized the opportunity afforded by the appointment of a new and inexperienced bishop, Alexander Stavensby, to make a formal deal with the Diocese of Lichfield. The dean's right to appoint and discipline the prebends was recognised. The bishop was to intervene only in the last resort, if the dean was not carrying out his functions. For his part, the dean recognised the bishop's right to be received with honour at St Peter's and to administer the sacraments there. However the whole issue blew up again in 1260, when Erdington repelled an attempt by Bishop Roger de Meyland to hold a canonical visitation by getting a royal prohibition on 8 November "against any person attempting anything against the privileges of Giles de Erdinton, king's clerk, dean of Wolverhampton, or of the king's chapel of Wolverhampton, or of the canons or servitors there." The prohibition cited a Papal rescript, issued at Lyon in 1245, that guaranteed the independence of royal chapels, which it characterised as ecclesiae Romanae immediate subjecta, directly subordinate to the Roman Church. They were therefore immune even from excommunication and interdict pronounced at a lower level, which disarmed the local bishop in his dealings with them.

Erdington was equally vigorous in promoting the economic interests of the college. Sometimes this meant taking a firm line over local issues: in 1230 he literally raised a stink by taking legal action against a chaplain at Tettenhall over marshland at Codsall that was creating a health hazard. Property agreements were carefully recorded, often by the device of a fine of lands, a conveyance registered by a fictional lawsuit. On 18 November 1236, for example, he was notionally sued for land at Kinvaston by Athelard: the two sides came to an agreement that Athelard's family would rent 1½ virgates from the dean and his successors for ½ mark annually. To make clear the college's territorial sway, he had the boundaries walked ceremonially. In 1248, for example, the king ordered the sheriff to organise a perambulation with twelve knights near Codsall where the College's lands bordered the Oaken estate of Croxden Abbey. Sometimes it was necessary to pursue offenders. In June 1253 the Dean and Chapter prosecute 39 local men who had entered the College's lands as an armed band, destroying fences and crops. None turned up in court and their sureties proved worthless, so the sheriff was ordered to take appropriate action.

Erdington was concerned that the church benefit from the town's booming trade, which was based mainly on wool. In 1258 Erdington secured for the deanery the lucrative right to hold a "weekly market on Wednesaday at Wolverhampton, co. Stafford, and of a yearly fair there on the vigil and Feast of Saints Peter and Paul and the six days following," both of which took place thereafter at the foot of the church steps. Erdington took care to placate other local magnates who might take offence at the growth of Wolverhampton, foremost among them being Roger de Somery, lord of neighbouring Sedgley. Somery was an ambitious man who wanted to establish himself in a castle at Dudley and had an interest in the town's future. In February 1261 the two sides came to a compromise. Erdington conceded various useful pieces of land, including 20 acres at Wolverhampton and roadside verges on the route through Ettingshall and Sedgley, in return for an annual rent of eight pounds of wax – useful to the church with its constant need for candles. Somery accepted Erdington's market without challenge, on condition his own family, as well as the burgesses and villeins might travel to and from Wolverhampton without tolls. In 1263 Erdington reinforced the position of his own burgesses by granting them the right to succeed to their burgages freely, on the same terms as those of Stafford. He established a chaplain in the church, probably a chantry priest. In 1398 a Chantry of St Mary was mentioned when Thomas of Wrottesley was appointed to it by the king: this may have been Erdington's chantry. Whatever the exemptions granted by earlier kings, it is clear that Wolverhampton and the other royal chapels in Staffordshire were paying secular taxation by this time: Wolverhampton's payment of 53s. 4d. towards the levy of a tenth was acknowledged in April 1268, along with similar sums from the chapels at Tettenhall, Stafford and Penkridge.

==== Theodosius de Camilla ====
The next dean was Theodosius de Camilla, an Italian cleric related to the powerful Fieschi family of Genoa, and a cousin of Pope Adrian V. He was appointed on 10 January 1269, following Erdington's death. As early as 1218, It was roundly asserted at Lichfield Assizes that "the Church and Deanery of Wuvlrenehamtum is of the King's gift. Giles de Ardington holds it by gift of the present King." However, in 1252, after Henry de Hastings perished in the Seventh Crusade, it was made clear that he had held the advowson of Wolverhampton deanery. Although the king was keen to assert his right, it seems likely that he was willing to sell or rent it if the need was great enough. However, the appointment of Theodosius was by the king himself. Moreover, the notification made clear that it included collation to the prebends – a potentially lucrative right.

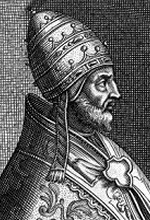
Pope Adrian V (Ottobuono de' Fieschi)

Theodosius was just as vigorous as Erdington in defending the college, but his tenure began to demonstrate some of the disadvantages of royal appointment. He was a notorious pluralist and a career diplomat rather than a pastor. In 1274 he came into conflict with Canterbury over the issue and his rectory of Wingham, Kent sequestrated by the Dominican Archbishop Robert Kilwardby until restored to him on the intervention of his cousin, Cardinal Ottobuono de' Fieschi. In 1276 he had even obtained a dispensation from Pope John XXI allowing him to hold both Wingham and Wolverhampton, without need of residence or even ordination, suggesting he was no more than a sub-deacon. The dispensation was conditional on his resigning two other benefices, one in the Diocese of Lincoln, the other York. No mention was ever made in this context of his prebends of Bartonsham in Hereford Cathedral and Yetminster Prima in Salisbury Cathedral His absences from the country on royal or personal business continued throughout his life. In February 1286 Edward I gave him letters to cover a visit to the Papal Curia and he appointed attorneys for his absence. In September 1289, again going overseas, he appointed Andrew of Genoa his attorney for a year. He was sent abroad again by the king in January 1291, and nominated attorneys until Midsummer.

Andrew of Genoa, was the main representative of Theodosius in and around Wolverhampton, his bailiff and proctor as well as his attorney. The deanery lands were exploited with great thoroughness. Around 1274, finding that tenants at Bilbrook had failed to pay their tallage or hand over their best pigs in return for pannage in the woods, the deanery simply seized their cattle on the road and sat out their attempt to gain restitution. In 1292 Andrew appeared in court for Theodosius as his bailiff in a dispute with the Abbot of Croxden over woodland at Oaken. After getting the case postponed with ingenious arguments about the true pronunciation of the name of the place, he resorted to challenging the property boundary and the jury found against him. It seems that he was ruthless in extracting value from the dean's woodland. The exploitation was so intense that Roger Le Strange, the Justice in Eyre took deanery woods back into Cannock Chase for protection: this area was recovered in June 1293. A writ for a full-scale inquisition into infractions of deanery and prebendal rights was issued later that year from Cambridge and it was held in Lichfield, with numerous issues rehearsed, particularly concerning woods and assarts around Hatherton, Wednesfield and Codsall.

At least some of the prebendaries were royal servants with pressing obligations elsewhere, while some travelled widely abroad. Geoffrey of Aspall was keeper of the wardrobe to Queen Eleanor, responsible for her finances. Theodosius collated at least three of his relatives to prebends. Edward de Camilla is known from a case in which Master Andrew was trying to recover £50 arrears for the farm of the deanery and Edward's prebend, which was let to a Wolverhampton entrepreneur: the largely absentee dean and canons did not manage their own estates but lived on advance fees paid by the farmers. Another Theodosius of Camilla, a canon of Wolverhampton, made preparations for a two-year overseas trip in 1298, nominating Andrew as his attorney, three years after Dean Theodosius died. Gregory of Camilla was setting off for Rome in July 1304.

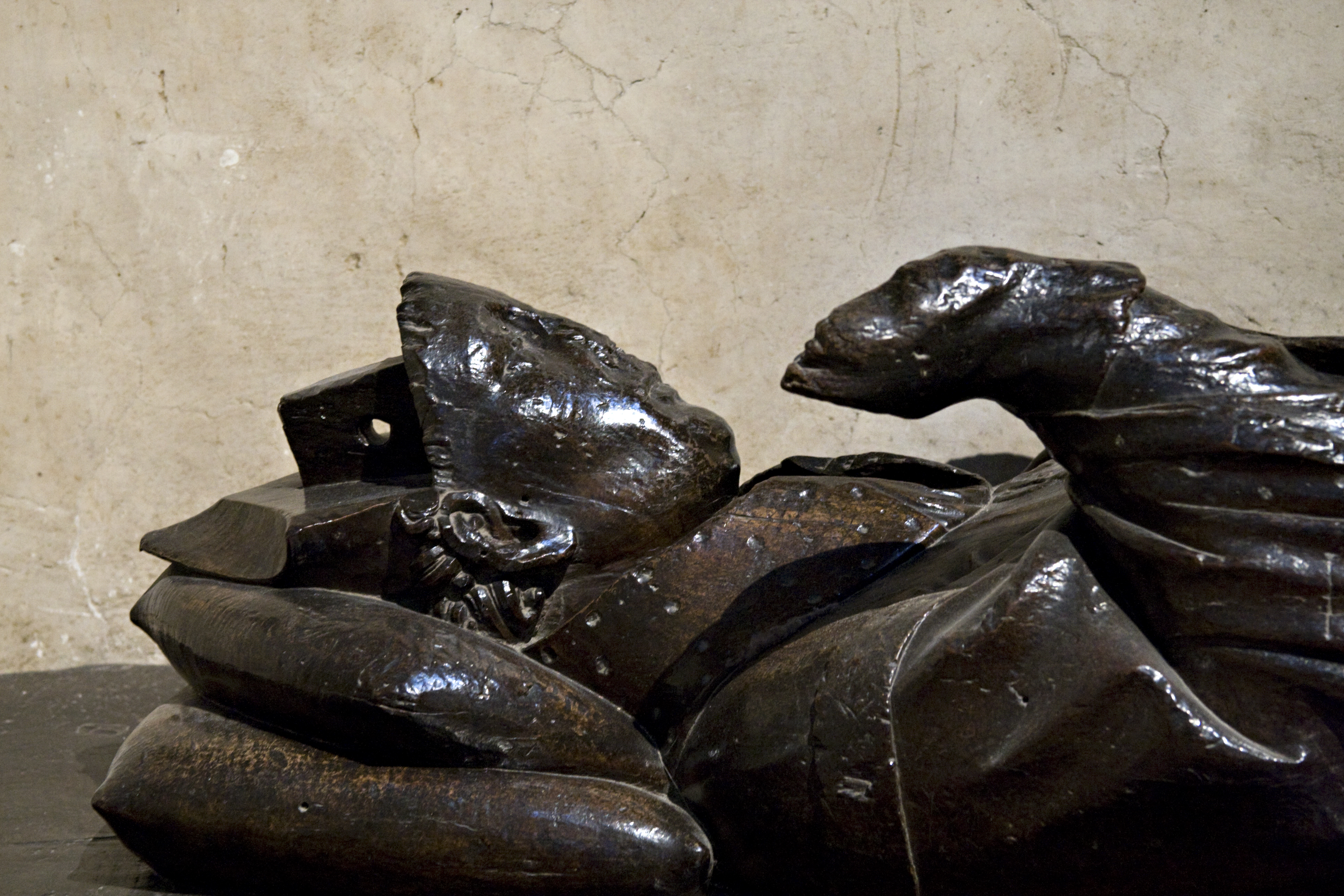
Effigy of John Peckham on his tomb in Canterbury Cathedral

Although he was seldom if ever present in Wolverhampton, the church was important enough to Theodosius for him to face down even the Archbishop of Canterbury in its defence. The Second Council of Lyons in 1274 denounced a number of abuses of which the prebendaries were plainly guilty, including non-residence and pluralism. The Franciscan Archbishop John Peckham was determined to bring the royal chapels to book. On 1 April 1280, while staying at Trentham Priory, he wrote a letter to the king, setting out clearly his intention to carry out a metropolitical visitation, against an explicit royal prohibition he had just received, and of backing it with excommunications where necessary.

On 27 July 1280, Peckham appeared at the doors of St Peter's, which were shut against him. He was forced to write to the dean and canons from the church cemetery, noting that "Tedisius of Camilla, who calls himself dean," was apparently overseas. He threatened them all with excommunication and summoned the prebendaries to meet him on 31 July. However, the canons of all the royal chapels in the diocese ignored him and on 11 November the sentences of excommunication were confirmed. On 13 December Peckham appointed Philip of St Austell, a cleric on his own staff, to complete the visitation. In February 1281 he wrote to the king to reiterate and to justify the sentences: apparently he was already feeling the force of royal censure. The pressure on Peckham seems to have been building, as he was compelled to write to the Bishop of Dublin, who was dean of Penkridge, and at least twice more to the king, arguing his case, which rested on his own interpretation of the precedent of Archbishop Boniface. On 23 February he wrote to Jordan, Bishop Meyland's official at Lichfield, warning him that it was a profanation of the sacrament to allow the excommunicated clerics to officiate at Mass. However, only a day later he wrote to the king to inform him that he had postponed the excommunications, excepting those of the clergy at Penkridge, pending the calling of a Parliament. Peckham agreed to allow the issue to be decided by a tribunal specially constituted for the purpose and on 21 May nominated the Dean of Arches as his proctor. An agreement was reached the following month by which Bishop Meyland accepted that six of the chapels, including Wolverhampton, were beyond the reach of any ordinary, on condition that he be honourably received in them, as before.

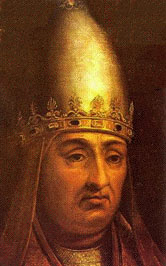
Pope Boniface VIII (Benedetto Caetani)

The archbishop's feud with Theodosius continued, however. He briefed his proctor in Rome for a campaign, stressing the dean's absenteeism and pluralism. In 1282 Camilla was excommunicated and deprived of his Wingham rectory and the church at Tarring. However, events began to move in his direction early in the following year, when Pope Martin IV ordered Peckham to restore the churches. His impunity was largely the result of his powerful contacts, including Benedetto Caetani, the future Pope Boniface VIII: Peckham wrote directly to him in an attempt to improve relations, but without result. Theodosius then began to pursue Peckham and his associates, the incumbents of the disputed churches, through the ecclesiastical courts. After arguments at a tribunal, the sides agreed to arbitration by Bernard, Bishop of Porto, which resulted in a triumph for Theodosius. Peckham and his group were ordered to pay him and his successors a pension of 200 marks in compensation. When he died in 1295, he was still Dean of Wolverhampton, despite all opposition.

Erdington and Theodosius brought St Peter's to its medieval peak of prosperity and influence, although its spiritual standards were already notorious. The economic well-being of the church was greatly improved by their unwillingness to pay tax. Theodosius was deriving 50 marks a year from the deanery by the 1290s, but declared only 20 marks for tax purposes. The total taxable value of the church was reported in the Taxatio Ecclesiastica, compiled 1291-2, as only £54 13s. 4d. This included six prebends, which are named for the first time at this point: Featherstone, Willenhall, Wobaston, Hilton, Monmore, Kinvaston. In addition there was the chantry of St Mary in Hatherton, which was shortly to become a seventh prebend.

=== 1300–1480: Neglect and revival ===
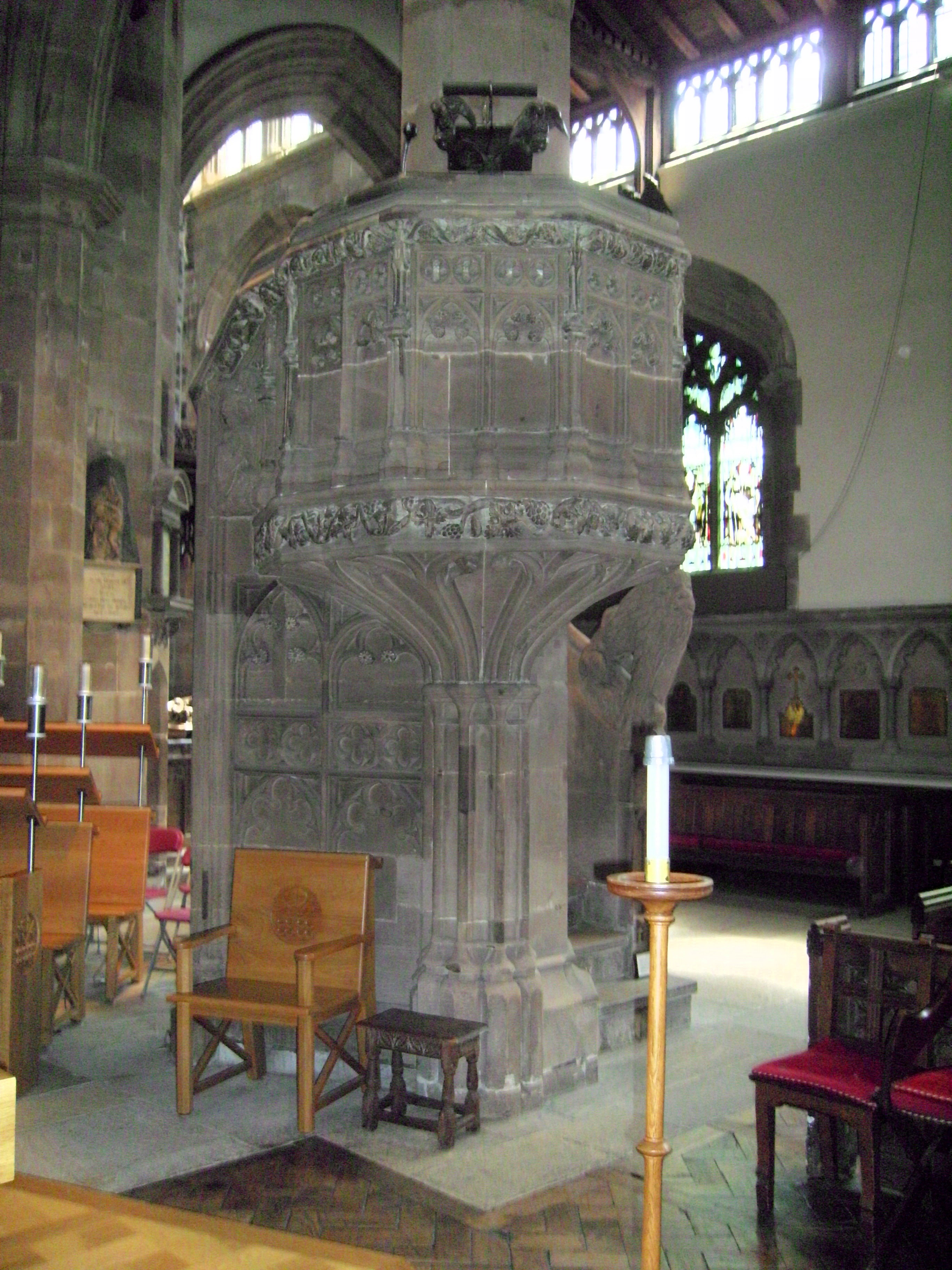
Medieval pulpit, probably mid-15th century, in the nave of the church. It is one of the best preserved of its period, with a full set of stone steps.

==== Dilapidation of fabric and alienation of land ====
Philip of Everdon was appointed dean by Edward I on 15 September 1295. In December 1302 he was warned by the king to revoke the collation of Ottobonus Malespania to a prebend by Papal provision. The following month the king ordered the sheriff to defend the rights of Nicholas de Luvetot, whom Philip had previously collated to the prebend of Kinvaston, against the Italian claimant. The incident seems to have marked a serious breach between king and dean. Further problems were to follow. While the 13th-century deans had been shrewd in business, enriching themselves through improvements to the church estates, their 14th-century successors would have struggled because of the economic crisis of the early 14th century and the ensuing Black Death. However, they frittered away the assets, and in some cases resorted to plain embezzlement. An underlying problem was the enclosure of waste for sale, which alienated it from the church's estates. On 1 May 1311 John of Everdon (1303–23) was licensed to enclose no less than 400 acres at Prestwood and Blakeley, on the edge of Wednesfield and inside Cannock Chase: by 1322 he was selling off this land in fee simple to John Hampton. In 1323, after John's death, Edward II ordered the escheator to sequester lands that he had alienated without licence, "to the prejudice of the king and the peril of disherison of the deanery, whereat the king is much disturbed." An inspeximus of 1376 revealed another of John's land sales in the area, and one dating from the time of Theodosius, but confirms both, "notwithstanding that the said plots were of the foundation of the said church, which is now called the king's free chapel of Wolvernehampton."

Dean Hugh Ellis (1328–39) was suspected of giving away much of the stock of the deanery and left the buildings dilapidated. After his death Edward III ordered a thorough survey and inquiry by a commission of justices in the presence of his new dean, Philip de Weston. A further commission in March 1340 added an investigation of the books, vestments and ornaments, while in the following year the king opined that Ellis had "wasted the goods and possessions of the deanery, whereby the divine worship and works of piety of old established there have been withdrawn." The report revealed great prodigality. A vast quantity of expensive cutlery, silverware, tableware, linen, precious stones, horses, livestock, even a relic of the True Cross, had been dispersed among friends and retainers or stolen from Hugh's custody. His own manse had fallen into serious disrepair, with defects in the walls, kitchen, part of the roof and farm buildings. Three cottages at Wednesfield had fallen into disrepair and been plundered for the materials. Oaks worth £10 had been felled and sold off at Pelsall. A mill and its pool were in disrepair. There were substantial tax arrears. However, the vestments and ornaments were not found defective. Philip de Weston himself seems to have problems with one of his bailiffs, John Buffry, who failed to render account of his work and failed to appear in court at Michaelmas 1356. It transpired that he had defrauded Weston and a chaplain of 55 marks. He was outlawed, surrendered himself and was confined in the Fleet Prison: the king pardoned him the following May. The incompetence and waste seems to have infected many of the royal chapels in the region and in 1368 the king, noting that they were immune from ordinary jurisdiction, set up commissions to carry out visitations of Wolverhampton, St Mary's Church, Bridgnorth, Stafford, Tettenhall and St Mary's Church, Shrewsbury. He alleged alienation, poor estate management, loss of books and vestments, the dissolute lives of the canons, neglect of worship and almsgiving, and misappropriation of funds. The visitation of Wolverhampton was headed by the Abbots of Halesowen and Evesham. In fact, Wolverhampton's deans had remained zealous in maintaining the college's rights and privileges, getting successive kings to confirm its charters, if most of the other accusations were true.

==== Continued decay and emerging opposition ====
After the king's visitation, the running of the church was much as before. Dean Richard Postell (1373–94) was careful of the church's liberties: in 1379 he obtained inspeximus and confirmation of letters patent of Edward III, a document that confirmed charters further back, to the time of Edward the Confessor. However, an inquisition of 1393 found that he had dismissed the six priests funded by Henry I's grant to celebrate the liturgy and for 19 years he had diverted the income, amounting to £26 13s. 4d. annually, to his own uses. It seems that he also embezzled money entrusted to him by prominent lay members of the congregation, Roger Leveson, John Salford and John Waterfall. There were complaints and appeals to the king about the judicial functions of his officials, with the cases being referred to the Archdeacon of Coventry for decision, presumably because these were matters concerning marriage and family. Near the end of his life his exasperated tenants launched a rent strike.

Lawrence Allerthorpe (1394–1406) continued to neglect the deanery. For his first three years of office he was also dean of St Mary's Stafford. In September 1399 he was made a Baron of the Exchequer by Henry IV, who had seized power that year. In February 1401 Archbishop Thomas Arundel sent delegates to carry out a visitation of St Peter's. Allerthorpe objected but had to back down, probably as Arundel was a key pillar of the new régime. Allerthorpe certainly retained royal favour after the affair and on 31 May 1401 was appointed Lord High Treasurer, a near-impossible job, given the disorder in the country and the low levels of royal receipts, as he made clear to the king later in the year. At Michaelmas 1402 his attorney appeared in court to complain that a group of Wolverhampton people had attacked and torn down the refreshment stalls he maintained in the town, perhaps enraged at a commercial monopoly enforced under spiritual excuses: the culprits did not appear and the case disappears from view. After Allerthorpe's death, rumours reached the king that great damage had been done to the deanery assets: the chancel was in disrepair and the estates and fences neglected. In July 1406 he set up an inquisition on the issue. In 1410, when Dean Thomas Stanley died, a further inquisition into dilapidations was set up, although it was acknowledged that Allerthorpe's executors had made due allowance for repairs, which Stanley had pocketed.

==== Lay initiatives ====
Despite this neglect, there were still plenty of pious people prepared to make large donations and bequests to the church. There were two chantry chapels in the collegiate church, both well-endowed. One of these was St Mary's chapel, probably Erdington's. The other dated from 1311, when Henry of Prestwood paid 20s. for a licence to alienate in mortmain a toft or farmhouse, 30 acres of land and rents worth 13s. 4d. so that a chaplain might sing Mass for him daily in St Peter's. To obtain the licence Henry had to attend an inquisition before the king's escheator, who was concerned to ensure that the king and the county suffered no unforeseen losses through the donation. This valued his gift at a total of 23s. 10d. per year. Henry was not of the landowning class but a middling farmer, all of whose lands were held of the dean: after his donation he was left with 3 carucates of land, 30 acres of meadow and 40 acres of pasture at Wednesfield.

Lay donations played a major part in securing priests for the outlying areas of the parish. By establishing chantries, the donors ensured at least one daily act of worship would take place in each chapel. The chaplain at Pelsall was maintained by William la Kue's grant of a house, 60 acres and rents – worth 60s. 6d. per year in total – made two weeks after Henry of Prestwood's grant in 1311, and following an inquisition at Walsall. At Willenhall services were sustained from a gift made by Richard Gervase: a house, 40 acres of land, four of meadow and a half share in a mill, altogether worth 40s. annually. This was to support a chantry with one chaplain to celebrate Mass daily for the souls of Richard, his wife Felicia and all their relatives. After an inquisition in October 1327 at Wolverhampton, the king licensed the chantry on 14 February 1328. Not until 1447 did Bilston acquire a similar chaplain, when Sir Thomas Erdington obtained a licence to found a chantry with one priest in the chapel of St Leonard and to grant land in mortmain to the chaplain up to the value of 40s. a year.

A special lay body, the "wardens of the light", was founded in 1385 to tend a light in honour of St Peter. A remarkable product of this lay piety was St Mary's Hospital — not a centre for medical treatment but an almshouse and chantry, established through the efforts of two wardens of the light: William Waterfall, a generous layman, and Clement Leveson, a chaplain at St Peter's. On 4 August 1392, in return for five marks, they obtained a licence from Richard II to found a hospital for a chaplain and six poor people and to alienate to it in mortmain a messuage and three acres. The following month Waterfall got permission to acquire for the hospital property and rents to the value of £10 per year. Initially the residents were to pray for the founders and Joan Waterfall, William's wife. Further permissions were required from the lord of the manor of Stow Heath and from the dean. Hence, Hugh, Lord Burnell, a powerful marcher lord, and Dean Lawrence Allerthorpe were added to the list of those for whom prayers were offered. The first recorded chaplain was John Pepard, who seems to have given his name to the hospital, Pyper's Chapel. It was situated east of the town, just in the manor of Stowheath, bordering Can Lane to the east: today this area is dominated by Wolverhampton bus station on Pipers Row.

==== Reversal of fortune ====
The decline of the church and its estates, which stood in stark contrast to the flourishing of lay piety, was stemmed by two deans, whose work in the town roughly spans the Wars of the Roses and who showed at least a modicum of interest in the church. Dean John Barningham (1437–57), sometimes rendered Berningham, recommenced work on the church building soon after his appointment. On 1 July 1439 a royal commission was issued to John Hampton, Thomas Swynforton, William Leveson, James Leveson, John de Mollesley, William Salford and Nicholas Leveson to quarry stone for the rebuilding from prebendal lands and supply it on reasonable terms. It was this that led to the reshaping of the building in substantially its present form. Barningham was firm in ensuring records were available and people held to account. In 1441 he sued Nicholas Leveson to give up a bag of deeds and charters that belonged to the church. Ten years later he sued his former bailiff, William Taillour, to render proper account of his term of office: Taillour did not appear, so the sheriff was ordered to arrest him and bring him to court during the Easter sessions. However, Barningham had much else on his mind, as he was deeply involved in the affairs of the Diocese of York, as a key supporter of Archbishop John Kemp and a member of the chapter of York Minster. This had begun well before his appointment as Dean of Wolverhampton, when he was collated to the prebend of Wetwang in 1426. In 1432 he was made Treasurer, one of the key administrative officers of the cathedral and diocese. In 1435 he became a canon of Beverley Minster and in 1450 provost of its chapter. He held numerous other benefices and became very wealthy. Even while dean of Wolverhampton, he was engaged from 1452 in a fruitless struggle to wrest the deanery of York from its holder. His will of 29 March 1457 made bequests to the town and its people.

Item lego ad fabricam navis ecclesiae de Wolverhampton c s.

Item lego xls. pro obitu meo celebrando in ecclesia predicta de Wolverhampton, Ixvj s. viij d. distribuendos ibidem inter pauperes et presertim inter pauperes tenentes meos ejusdem dominii.

Translation:

In the same way, I set aside for the building of the nave of Wolverhampton church 100 shillings.

Likewise, I set aside 40 shillings for my obit in the aforementioned church of Wolverhampton. 66 shillings and 8 pence to be distributed in the same place among the poor, particularly the church's poor tenants.

Barningham was as generous as he was wealthy, leaving bequests for many parishes and institutions with which he was associated. His generosity to Wolverhampton, however, contrasts with £50 for York Minster: even for this dean, Wolverhampton was at the periphery of his activity.

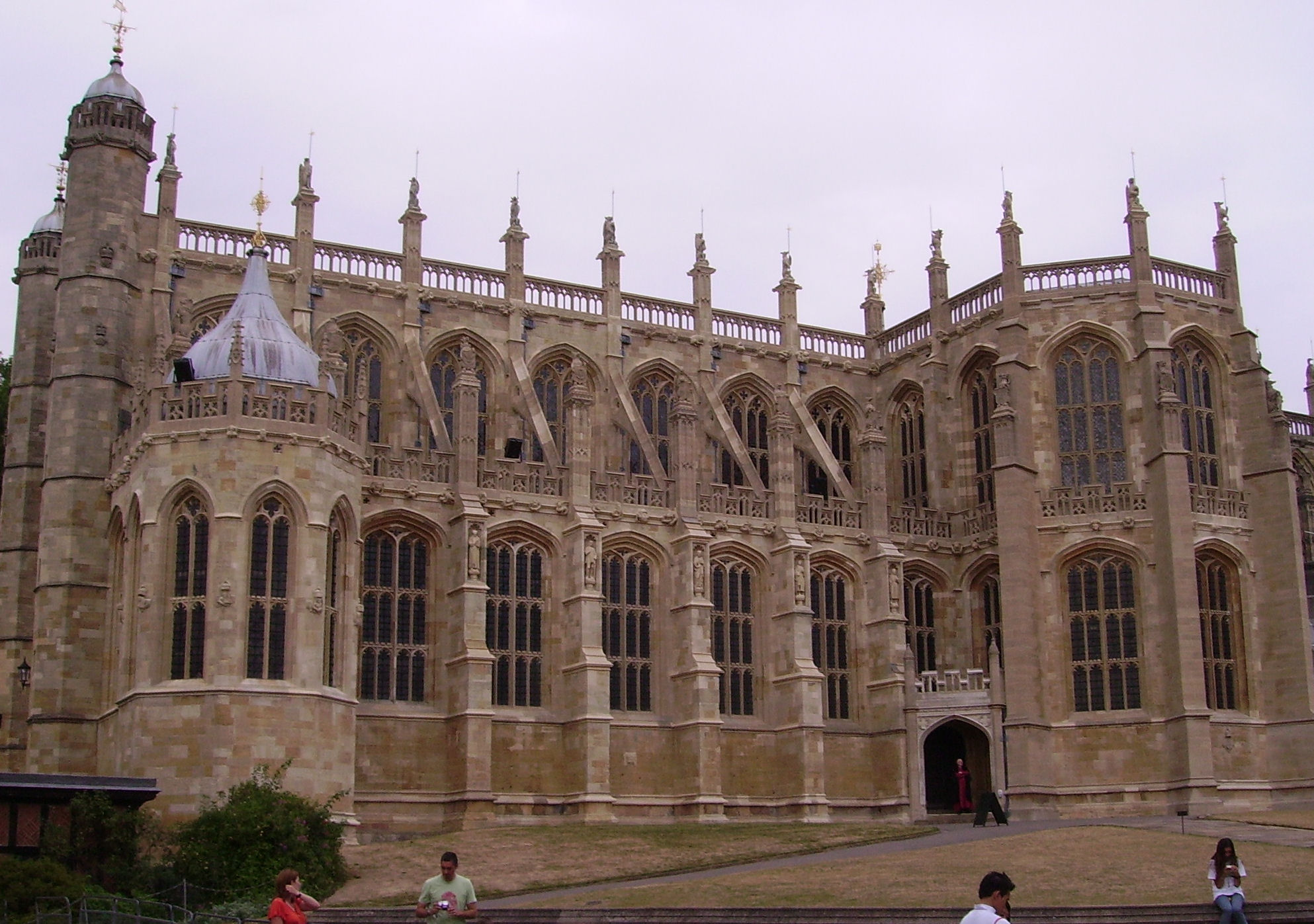
St George's Chapel, Windsor Castle

William Dudley, his successor, managed much of the rebuilding. He was also Dean of Windsor, the first Dean of Wolverhampton to hold both posts. In 1461 he had the important charters confirmed by Edward IV, the first of the new Yorkist dynasty. On 31 July 1476 he became Bishop of Durham and was consequently unable to remain dean. Despite their many diversions, Barningham and Dudley at least gave the town a new church and improved its prestige considerably.

After Dudley moved to Durham, Lionel Woodville, the Queen's brother was dean for a few years, but he resigned when he became Chancellor of the University of Oxford. It must therefore have been immediately after the appointment of a new dean, Richard Beauchamp, already Bishop of Salisbury and Dean of Windsor, that on 21 February 1480 a grant from Edward IV created a permanent union between the deanery of Wolverhampton and that of St George's Chapel, Windsor Castle. This was explicitly made not only to Beauchamp himself but also to succeeding deans of Windsor. Moreover, it confirmed their valuable right to collate to prebends at Wolverhampton – a right they did not have at Windsor.

=== 1480–1603: Royal peculiar and Reformation ===
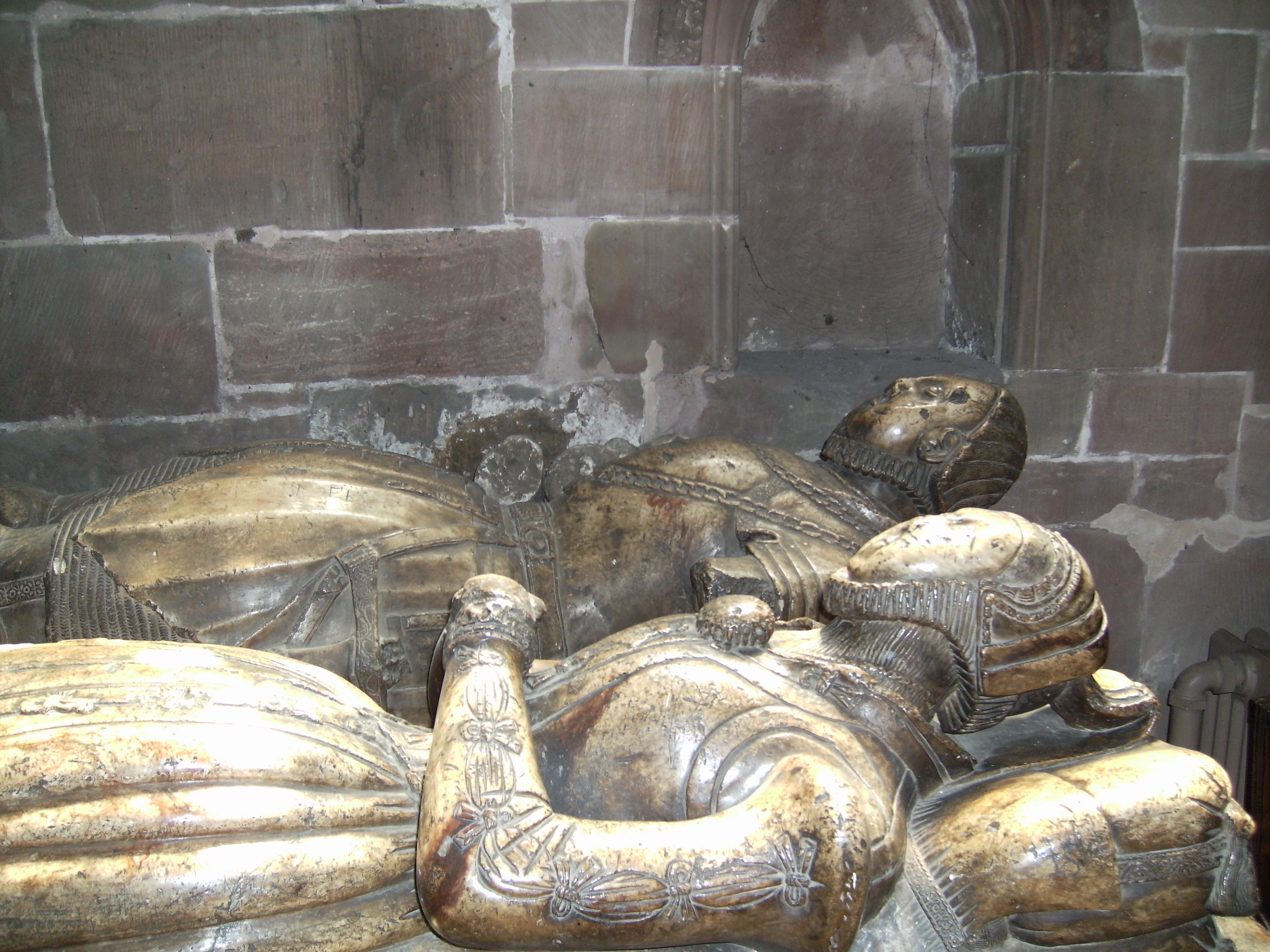
The tomb of John and Joyce Leveson in the Lady Chapel, 1575, attributed to Robert Royley of Burton on Trent, the oldest surviving monument in the church. John was a cousin of James Leveson, like him a Merchant of the Staple, and like him had financial interests in the deanery and prebends. This financial entanglement ultimately proved ruinous for the church.

It is from this point that Wolverhampton is generally considered a royal peculiar or peculier, although it had claimed and vindicated its status as a royal chapel, independent of the diocesan authorities, for many centuries already. From 1480, however, it was formally placed on a footing with St George's Chapel, Windsor Castle, the monarch's own household chapel. It was never subsumed into Windsor. For about half a century, about half of the prebendaries were also canons of Windsor, but this practice petered out in the 16th century. The link between Wolverhampton and Windsor persisted purely through the dual role of the deans and Wolverhampton kept its own seal–a key indicator of institutional independence.

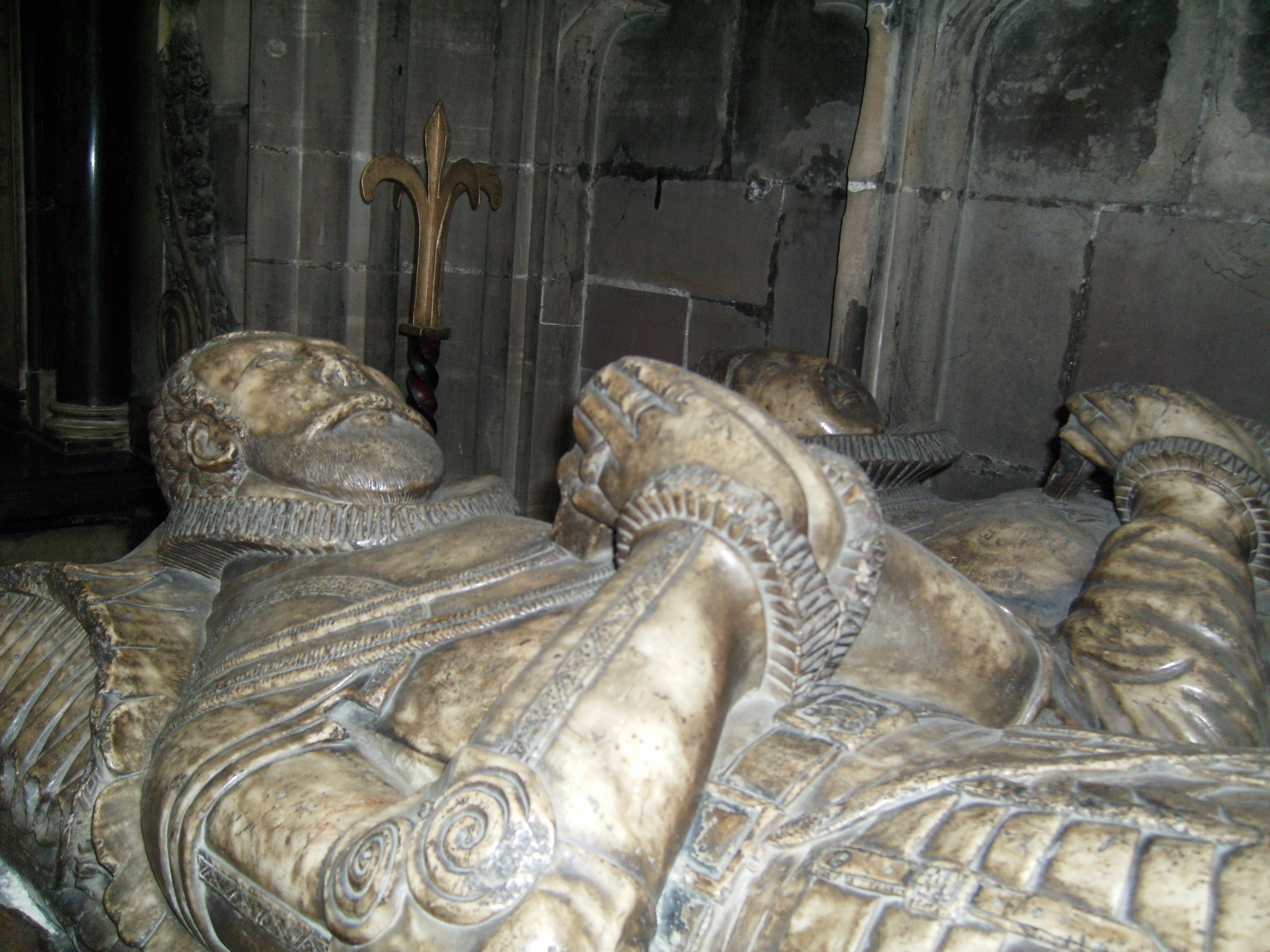
Tomb of Thomas and Katherine Lane of Bentley, c. 1585, attributed to Robert Royley of Burton on Trent, in the north chapel. The Lanes were important landowners in Staffordshire and, although they accepted the Reformation, closely allied with the recusant Giffard family of Chillington Hall

As the deans and most of the canons continued to be absentees, their lands and rights were increasingly farmed out. From 1516, it was James Leveson, one of the immensely rich and powerful Merchants of the Staple who increasingly took over responsibility for exploiting their estates. The rent agreed for the deanery holdings was £38, and Leveson managed to keep it fixed for 25 years, despite steady inflation. He also gradually extended his investments into the prebendary holdings. The Leveson family inherited and extended his interests after he died. (The name Leveson is pronounced /ˈljuːsən/ LEW-sɜn and is a patronymic from Louis or Lewis)

The Reformation brought dissolution for the second time in the college's history. It was threatened under the first Chantry Act in 1545 but survived because Henry VIII died before it could be implemented. Edward VI's Protestant guardians brought in a second act in 1547. The Dean argued that Wolverhampton should be exempt, as Windsor was specifically excluded from the terms of the act. Nevertheless, the college was dissolved and replaced by a vicar and curates, on £20 a year. This was not a great hardship for the dean and canons, as they continued to receive pensions at the same level as their former income from their benefices. In December 1552 William Franklyn, who remained dean of Windsor, had his and his successors' profits from Wolverhampton guaranteed, although limited to £40 annually. Moreover, the canons had farmed out most of their holdings on perpetual leases, at fixed and very low rents, to the Leveson and Brooke families—allegedly in the hope of recovering them later and protecting the college's investments, but probably to make a quick gain before dissolution. The sale was authorised by the chapter of Windsor, which was not lawful, as the two colleges had separate seals and finances. The prebendal and the deanery estates themselves were confiscated by the Crown, then granted to John Dudley, 1st Duke of Northumberland, then the leading figure in Edward's government, and his wife Jane.

However, Queen Mary's Counter-Reformation soon restored the old regime. As Northumberland was attainted, his property was forfeit, so it was relatively easy to restore the college's property. This was presented by Mary's letters patent of 26 December 1553 as a favour to St George's College, Windsor. She referred to the great love her ancestors had for the chapel and made clear this was a restoration of the grant of Edward IV. Franklyn, the seven prebendaries and the sacristan were all named and reinstated in their posts for life and the structure of the college described in detail. However, Mary's gracious act left the years 1547–53 in legal limbo, with the status of any transactions carried out by the canons during those years uncertain. St Peter's was the only royal peculiar in the region to be restored: all the others proved intractable, as the property had been sold or given to landowners in good standing, many of them pious Catholics. The little hospital of St Mary was not so fortunate. The provision to say prayers for the dead would have guaranteed its dissolution as a chantry and it is never heard of again, apparently absorbed into the Leveson estates.

Despite a decision to follow a broadly Protestant path, Elizabeth I did not pursue the matter further, and confirmed the restoration of the college by royal charter in 1564. This meant a restoration of the old abuses. The deans and most of the canons stayed away, failing to attend even the quarterly chapter meetings and paying scant wages to deacons, and in some cases unordained readers, to perform their functions at St Peter's. The running of Wolverhampton's church devolved upon the sacrist, who was paid a separate income, amounting to the reasonable sum of £26 by the mid-17th century, and given a seat on the chapter. It seems that he held the estate allocated to the morrow-mass priest before 1548, which may have been the grant of Henry of Prestwood.

=== 1603–1660: Religious strife and civil war ===
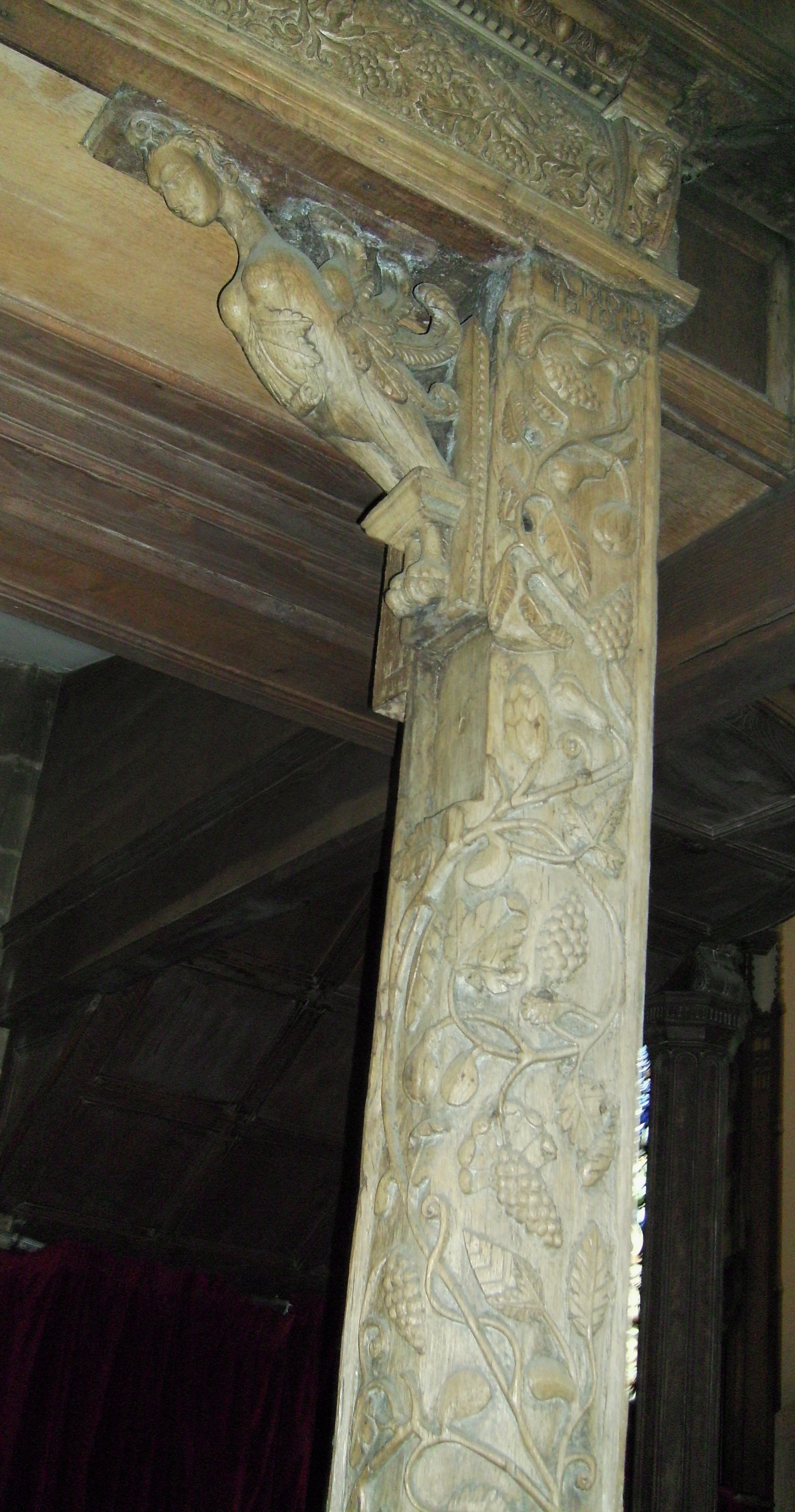
Fine carving on a pillar of the wooden west gallery. The Puritans tended to dislike such ostentatious decoration, although their ire was mainly directed against items that symbolised theological differences between radical Protestants and High Churchmen, like altars. West galleries in many churches were strongholds of popular music making in subsequent centuries.

==== "That captivated Church" ====
A Puritan survey, which can be dated fairly confidently to the first three months of 1604, found considerable cause for concern. Seven stipendiaries were doing the work: four of them were on incomes of 10 nobles (£6 6s. 8d.) and three on £6. These compare unfavourably with estimates of the incomes required to sustain celibate medieval priests: Bishop William Lyndwood had thought £6 13s. 4. necessary in the early 15th century, well before the inflation of the Tudor period. Six of the seven prebends were in the hands of Walter Leveson. The parish was said to have a population of 4000, many of them Catholic in sympathy and recusant. In the satellite chapel at Pelsall the curate's stipend was £4. At Bilston and Willenhall the curates had no reserved stipend. Two of the curates, named as Mounsell and Cowper, were said to be "notorious drunkards and dissolute men." No comment was made on the parochial work of the sacristan.

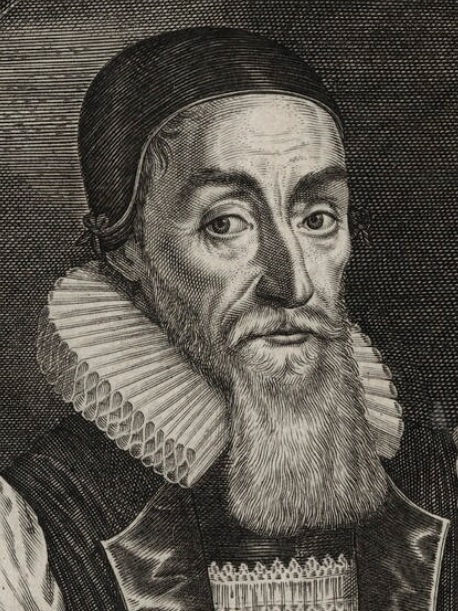
Joseph Hall

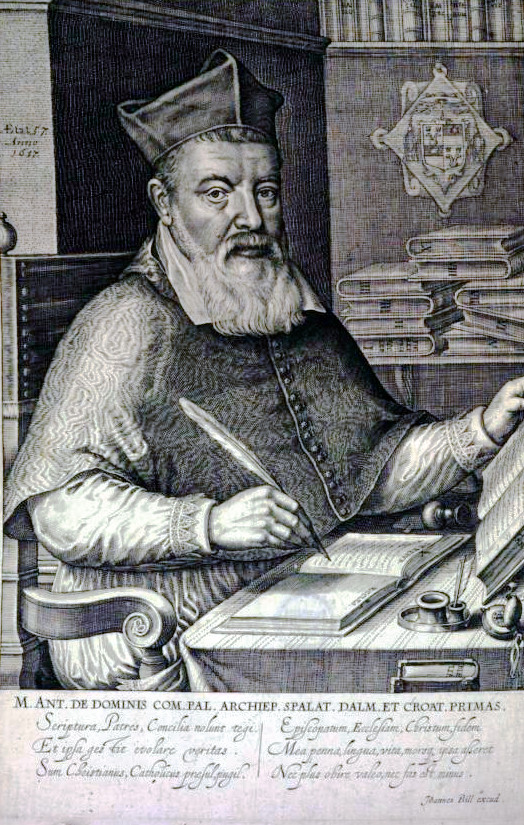
Marco Antonio de Dominis, Archbishop of Spalato, Croatian cleric, theologian and scientist, who left the Roman Catholic Church for a time and was Dean of Windsor and Wolverhampton

The far from Puritan Joseph Hall, later Bishop of Exeter and Bishop of Norwich, took a similarly negative view of St Peter's. Starting his career as a chaplain to Henry Frederick, Prince of Wales, he was sent in quest of a prebend by a relative, Samuel Barton (also rendered Burton), Archdeacon of Gloucester, who, "knowing in how good terms I stood at Court, and pitying the miserable condition of his native Church of Wolverhampton, was very desirous to engage me in so difficult and noble a service, as the redemption of that captivated Church." His connections secured him free collation to the prebend of Willenhall, which he seems to have held from 1610. Several of his contemporaries at Wolverhampton were also ambitious, rising clerics, like the consecutive Hatherton prebendaries Godfrey Goodman, a Catholic sympathiser and future bishop, and Cesar Callendrine, a German Calvinist minister who long headed the Dutch Reformed Church in London. Hall found St Peter's under the thumb of Walter Leveson: "the freedom of a goodly Church, consisting of a Dean and eight prebendaries competently endowed, and many thousand souls lamentably swallowed up by wilful recusants, in a pretended fee-farm for ever." Because of this the prebend was worth only 19 nobles or £6 3s. 4d. Using the evidence of forged seals and documents, Hall and other prebendaries became involved in a protracted action against Leveson in the Kings Bench. This was on the brink of complete success, with Dean Marco Antonio de Dominis content, when Leveson died, leaving the situation confused. In 1622 Hall resigned the prebend and the Dean appointed in his place "a worthy preacher, Mr Lee, who should constantly reside there, and painfully instruct that great and long neglected people: which he hath hitherto performed, with great mutual contentment and happy success."

==== The High Church triumphant ====
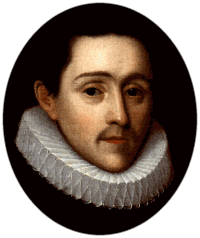
Dean Matthew Wren

Lee quickly gained a reputation as a forceful Puritan preacher, so Hall must have been of an eirenic temper to value his work so highly. Lee's preaching seems to have been popular and he met strong opposition from Matthew Wren, a prominent Laudian who was appointed Dean in 1628. The High Church party had come into the ascendancy with the accession of Charles I. Wren particularly objected to the fact that Lee had taken up residence in Wolverhampton and preached regularly. Matthew Wren became Bishop of Hereford in 1634 and was succeeded as dean by his brother, Christopher Wren, the father of the famous architect. Christopher Wren tried unsuccessfully to pursue Hall's work in the courts, petitioning Francis Cottington, 1st Baron Cottington, Master of the Court of Wards and Liveries, that the prebendal lands be restored to the Church when the rent of £38 fell into arrears under Walter Leveson's young son, Thomas. Wren took panic measures to deal with Lee, ignoring the traditional independence of the church to call on Archbishop William Laud to institute a metropolitical visitation. This was conducted by Nathaniel Brent, who toured the Midlands, purging churches where there had been complaints of nonconformity. Lee was suspended but, when Brent acted similarly at Shrewsbury, the congregation of St Julian's church installed Lee as their lector. On 11 October 1635 Wren celebrated with an elaborate ceremony to consecrate a new High Altar in St Peter's. William Prynne, the Presbyterian publicist, gleefully described an item he saw as bizarre and idolatrous.

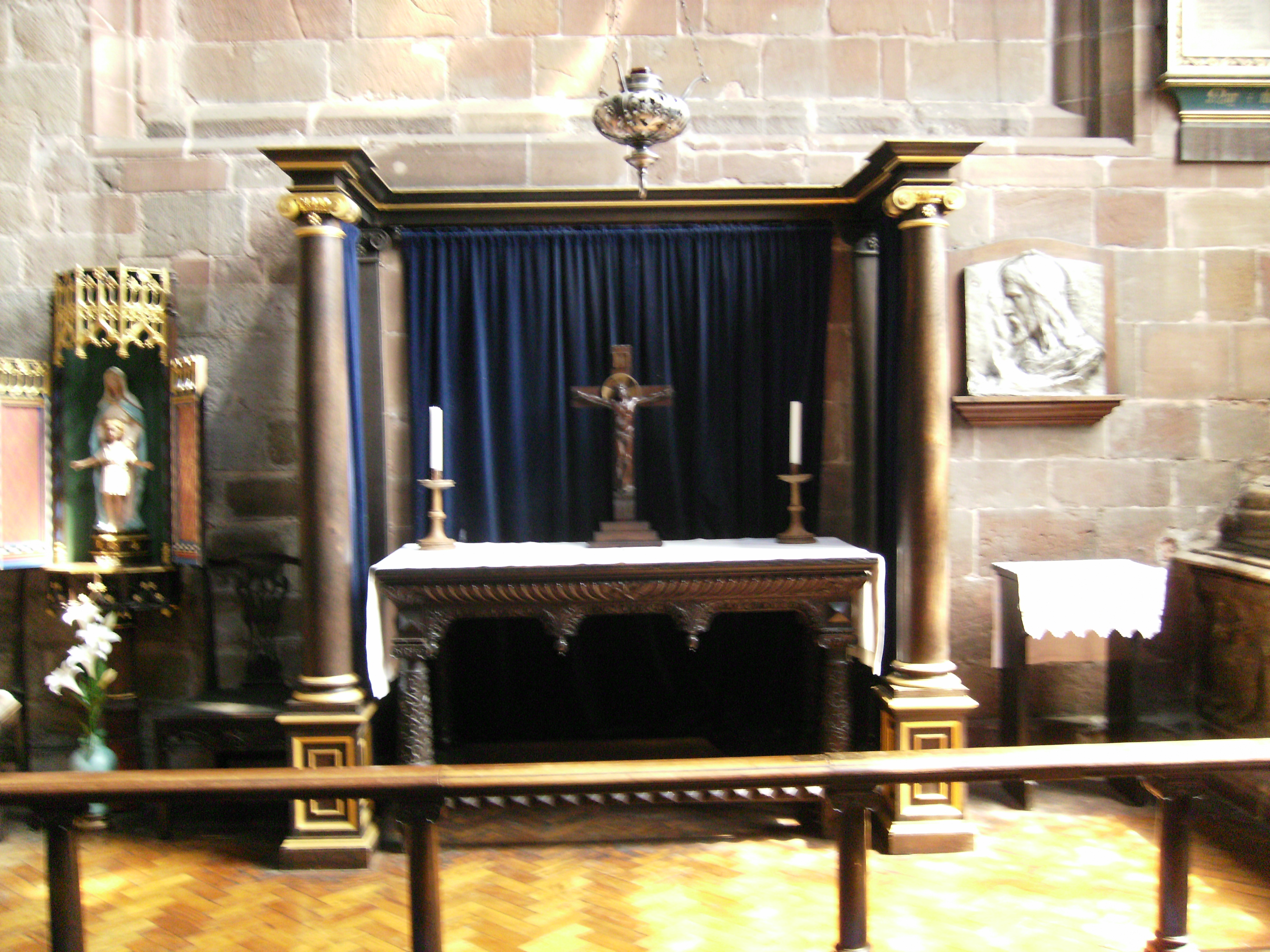
Perhaps the altar that bemused Prynne, it is now in the Lady Chapel.

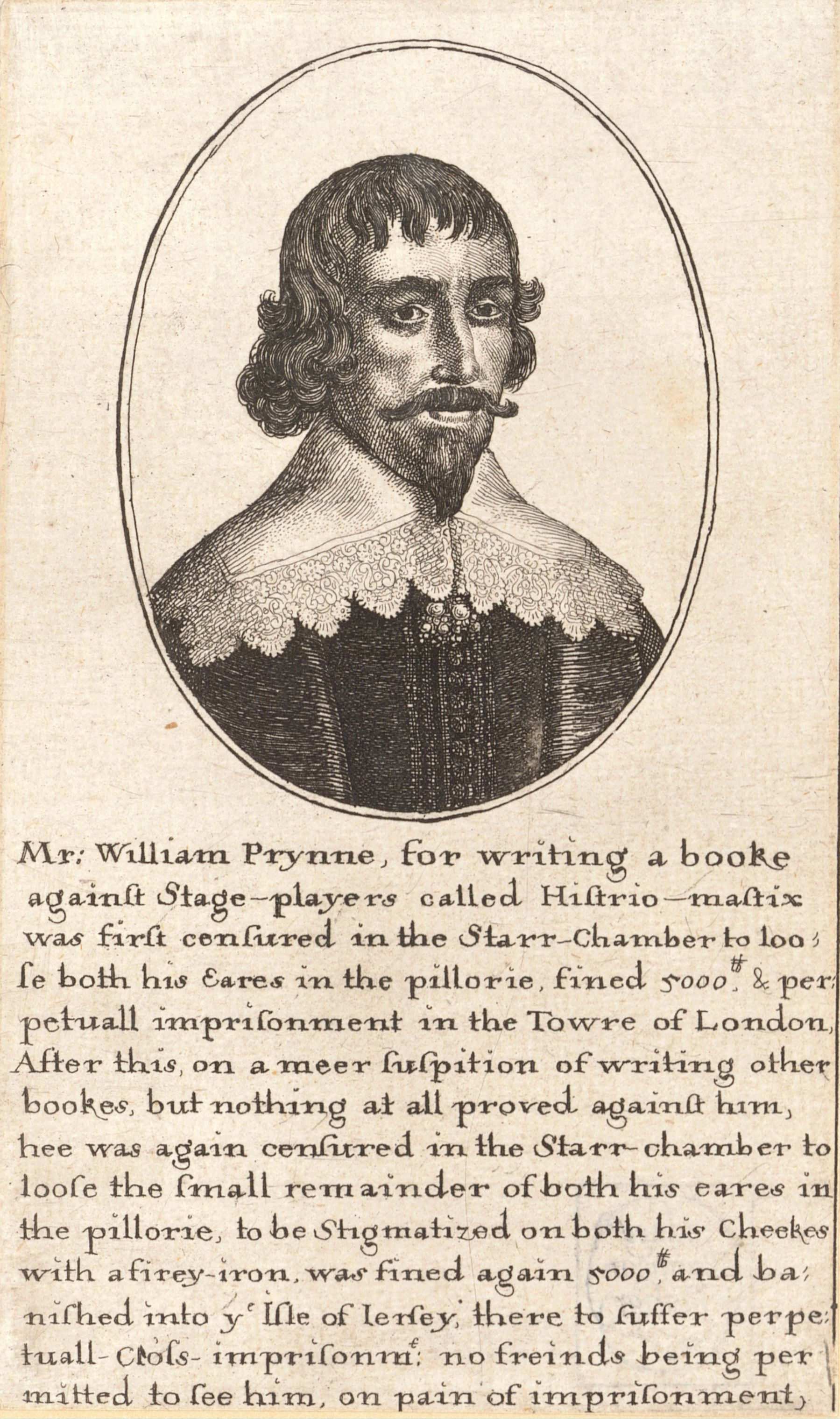
William Prynne, by Wenceslaus Hollar

Maister Edward Latham, one of the Proctors of Leichfeild, & Surrogate of Woluerhampton accompanied with some 20. or 30. Persons, men, weomen and Chorasters, came to the Towne, many of the Inhabitants, but chiefly the Clergie going to meet him. The intent of his & their coming, was to performe the solemnity of Dedicating the Communion Table to be an Altar, and of consecrating certeyne Altar Cloathes (as they said) to the glory of God. The Table was made new for this purpose, being about a yard & an halfe in length, exquisitely wrought and inlaid, a fayre wall of waynscot being at the backe of it, & the rayle before it, was made to open in the middle, & not at one side; the middle, where the Ministers tread, being matted with a very fayre Matt. Vpon the Table was placed a faire Communion Booke, couered with cloth of gold, & bossed with great silver Bosses, together with a faire Cushion of Damaske, with a Carpet of the same; both party coulored of skie coulor & purple, the fringe of the Carpet being blew & white.

The dedication service itself was replete with incense, ritual hand washing and elaborate music, all calculated to offend or puzzle the Puritans.

Over the succeeding years disciplinary action was taken against Puritan laity. In June 1638 William Pinson, a lawyer who had moved to Birmingham after the visitation, was called before the Court of High Commission, along with John Rogers, for his activities in at St Peter's during 1631–36, appearing before Sir John Lambe, Dean of the Arches, and Sir Charles Caesar, the Master of the Faculties. He was accused of maintaining conventicles in his house because he had prayed, recalled sermons and discussed scripture with groups of friends, although he denied the events had any regular or formal character. He was in trouble too because his wife had shown insufficient respect for the churching of women by failing to wear a veil at the service: she had put a table napkin on her head when challenged. Allegedly Pinson had conducted a campaign of vexatious litigation against Hugh Davies, the chaplain involved in the incident. Pinson maintained that "Mr. Davies refused to church her, and so she departed unchurched, to her and his grief." This may have been disingenuous, as the churching of women had provided a focus for Puritans in the West Midlands to confront the High Church establishment for some time.

Pinson got off fairly lightly. He was registered as admonished in January 1640 and final sentencing was twice postponed before his case was simply dropped on 6 November 1640. However, others seem to have suffered prison. A letter from one Tarte, a Puritan who had fled to America, to Edward Latham, the dean's official, condemned him for imprisoning a Puritan activist called William Knight. The letter compared Latham to the notorious Edmund Bonner and threatened him with destruction "as a millstone that is cast into the sea." The letter was filed with the Court of High Commission.

==== Civil war and Commonwealth ====
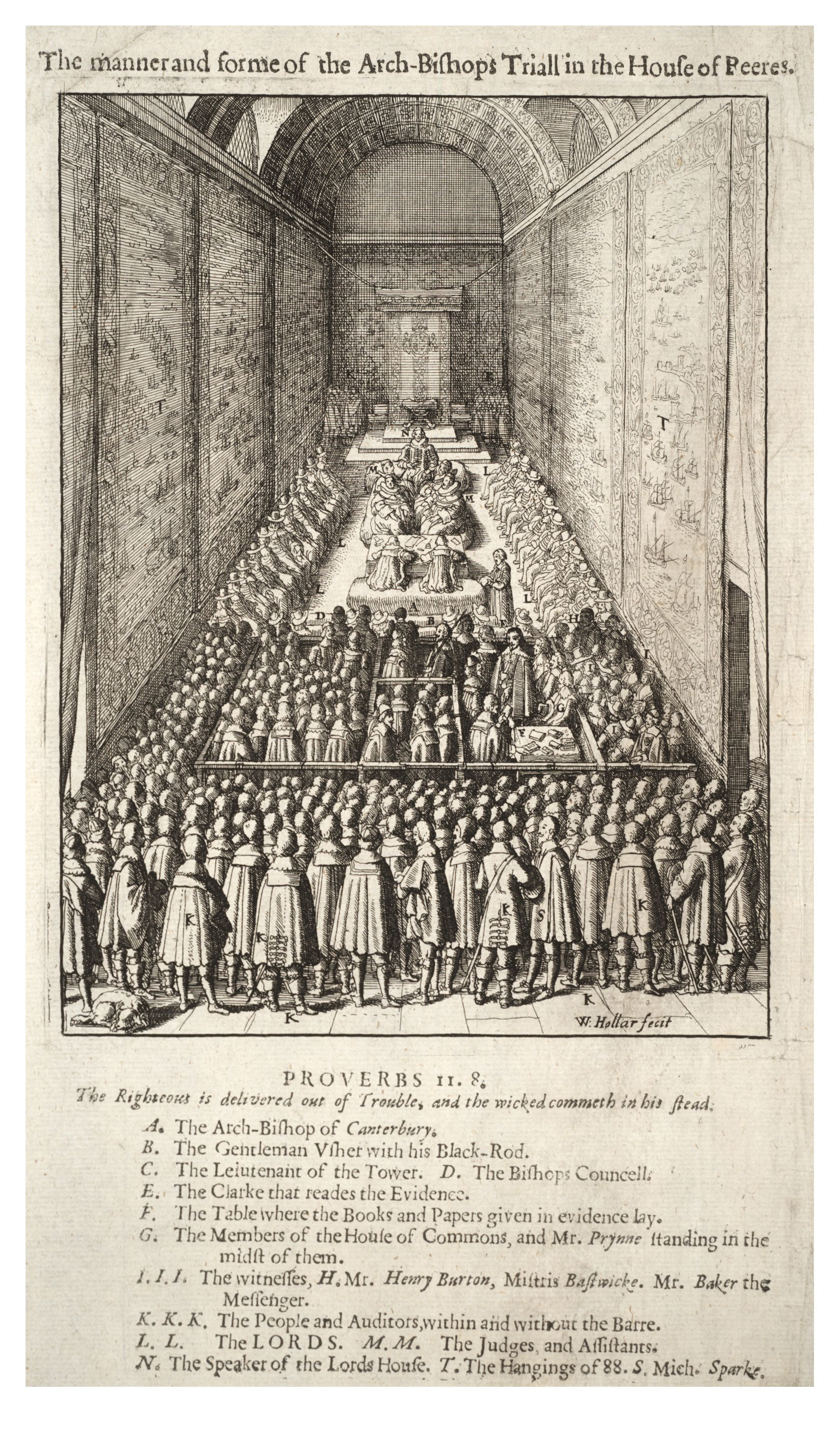
The trial of Laud, depicted by Wenceslaus Hollar

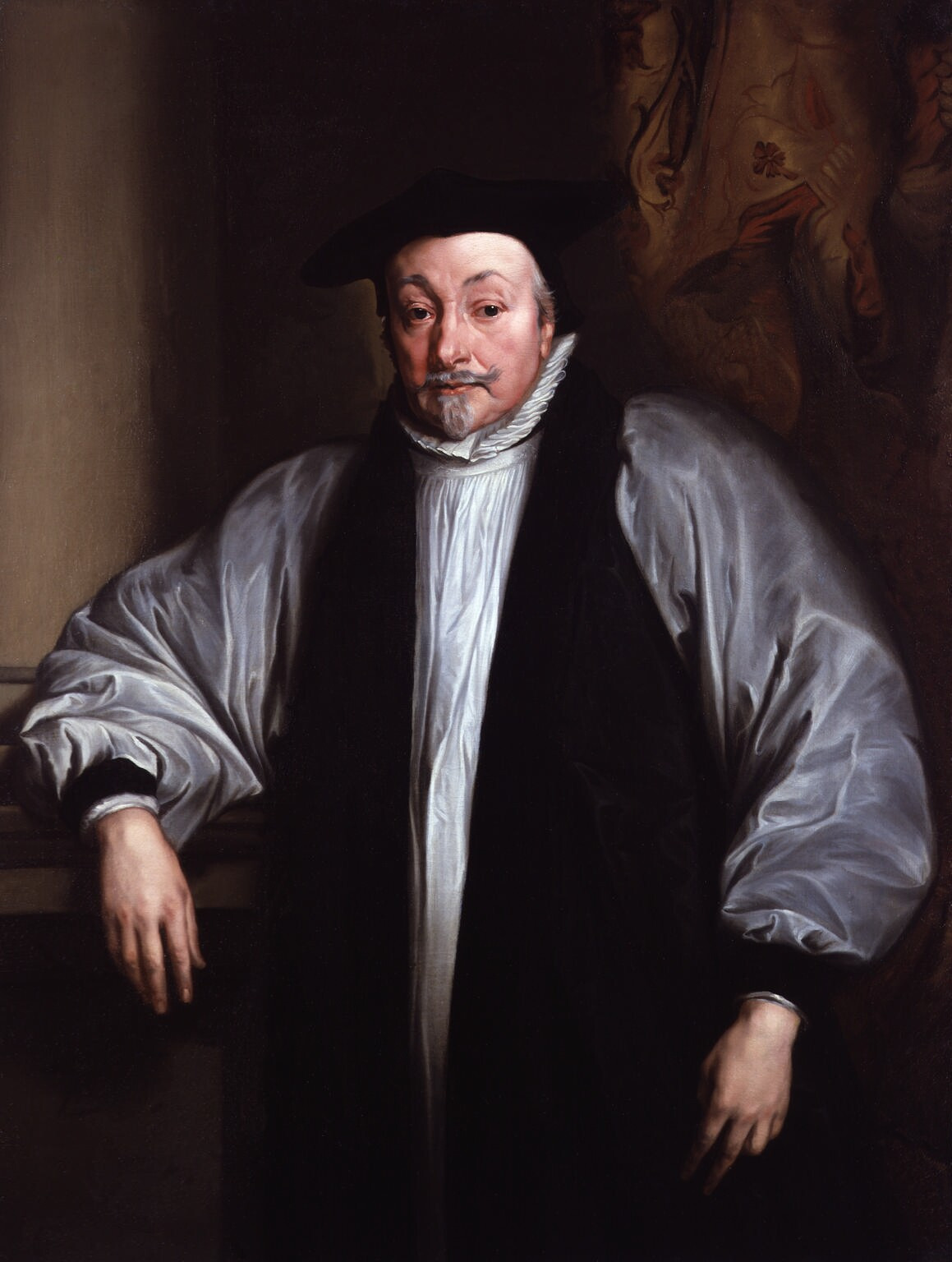
William Laud, after Anthony van Dyck

This short-lived triumph for the Laudians came at a price for Laud himself. When the Long Parliament assembled in 1640, his arrest was one of its first acts. In 1644, during the English Civil War, he was tried for treason and the events at Wolverhampton formed an important part of the case brought against him. Evidence was given by two Wolverhampton men, Leonard Lee, Richard's brother, and William Pinson. Richard Lee himself was promoted to curate at St Julian's, Shrewsbury, in 1642 on the eve of war, but cannot have stayed long in the town, which quickly fell to the royalists. The Clergy of the Church of England database, if the identification is correct, records his appointment in 1640 as vicar of Melbourne, where the advowson was held by John Coke, and in 1643 as rector of Rugby, where the patron was Humphrey Burnaby. However, Laud himself referred only to Lee's appointment at Shrewsbury during the trial. Prynne mentions that during the trial Lee was residing in Shoreditch, by order of Parliament. Prynne printed a memorandum of March 1634 that he had found among John Lambe's paper. The original, he claimed, was in the handwriting of Laud's secretary, William Dell, and it was addressed to Nathaniel Brent. In this Laud appeared to prejudice the visitation by singling out Richard Lee.

And that you take speciall notice of one Mr Lee, a Prebend there who hath been the Author of much disorder thereabouts, And if you can fasten upon any thing, whereby he may justly be censured, pray see it be done, and home, or bring him to the High Commission Court to answer it there, &c. But HOWEVER let him not obtain any License to Preach any Lecture there, or in another Exempt place hard by at Tetenshall, whither those of Wolverhampton do now run after him, out of their Parish; Note. for the Church hath not much need of such men. If you speak with Mr Latham of Litchfield who is the Surrogate there, he will informe you more fully concerning this Businesse. That he (the said Mr Lee) hath Churched Refractory Women in private &c. That he is averse to all good Orders of the Church. As also that in another place thereabouts they caused a Bell-man in open Market to make Proclamation for a Sermon...

At his trial in July 1644 Laud argued that he ordered proceedings against Lee only "If there were found against him that which might justly be Censured," a wording that differs significantly from Prynne's version. Laud claimed the responsibility for singling out Lee was not his because "the Dean of Windsor his Ordinary complained unto me, that Mr. Lee's Carriage was so Factious there, that he could contain him in no Order. If he were a Man after this approved at Shrewsbury (as Mr: Walker witnesses) I hope the Proceedings at Wolverhampton did him good." He then resorted to blaming his secretary for the discrepancy between his intention and the wording of the memorandum: "I believe your Lordships would not willingly answer for every Phrase of your Secretaries Letters, which yet you command them to write." Although the trial itself was inconclusive, Laud was later attainted and beheaded.

St. Peter's church itself suffered considerable damage at the hands of Parliamentary soldiers in 1642. Much worse was an attack on the chapter house by royalist soldiers under Colonel Leveson, which resulted in the loss of all its records. Victoria County History attributes the dissolution of the college by Parliament to a law of 1643 that suppressed all deans and chapters and was implemented after the fighting drew to a close. However, Shaw points out this Ordinance for sequestring notorious Delinquents Estates, which did name 14 bishops and refer to deans and prebends, was not a law against Church lands but an expedient for raising funds for the Parliamentary army. Not until October 1644 did Parliament begin to consider how best to turn the resources of the Church toward better support for the parish ministry. This resulted in an act of October 1646 to abolish bishops and archbishops and to turn their assets over to trustees, and another ordinance the following month to implement the sale of their lands. This formed the model for legislation to abolish the deans and chapters, which was not introduced until more than a year later. However, its progress was long delayed and only in April 1649 did Parliament pass the Act for abolishing of Deans, Deans and Chapters, Canons, Prebends and other offices and titles of or belonging to any Cathedral or Collegiate Church or Chappel within England and Wales.

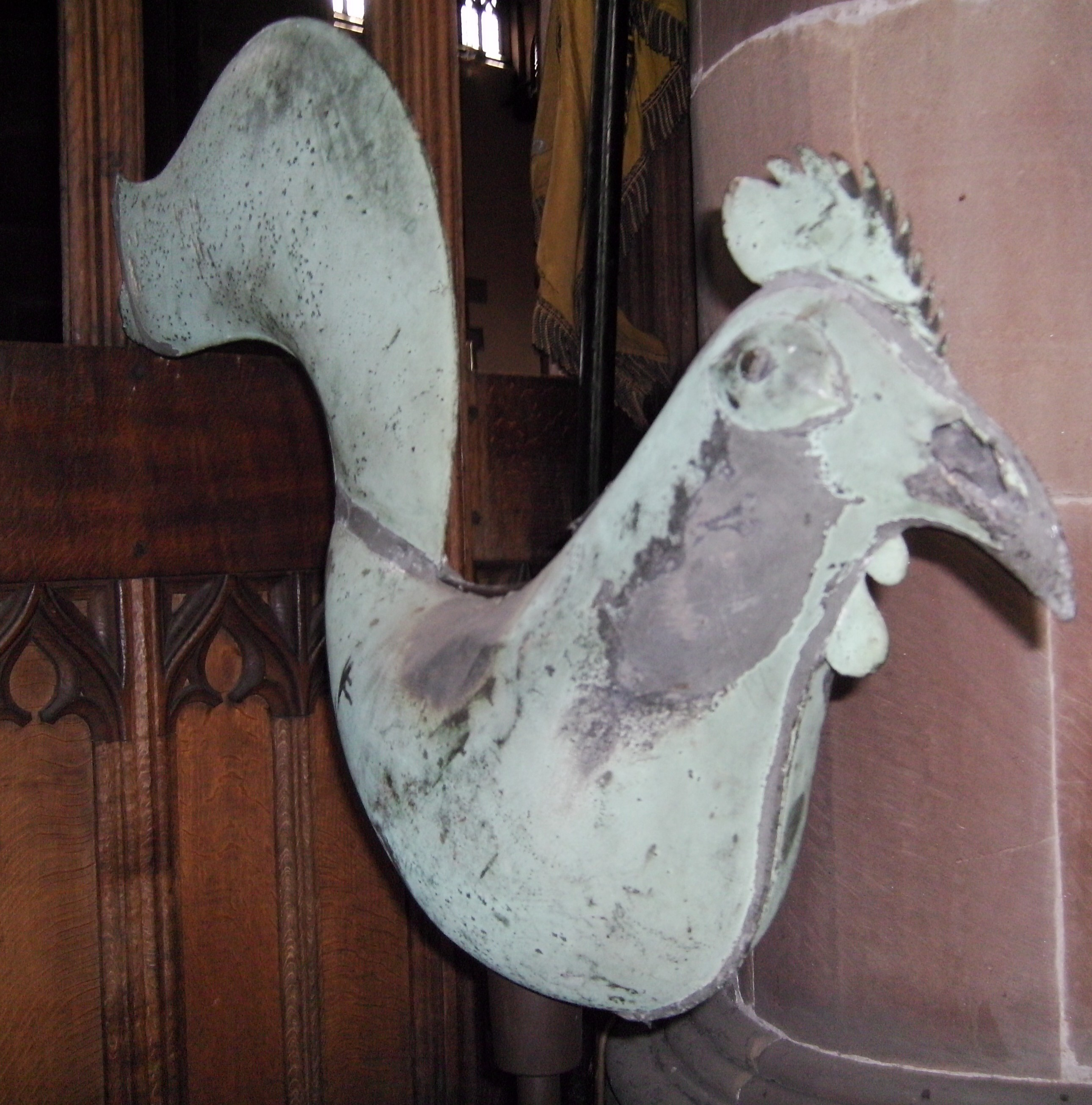
A weathercock, dated 1646, is perhaps the only item in the church from Richard Lee's incumbency, and an apt symbol of the constantly changing fortunes of the time.

Richard Lee returned to St Peter's as minister in 1646, supported by a grant of £100. VCH says that the post of sacrist was abolished and his £26, together with a further £50, was provided for an assistant minister. However, these figures are derived from a petition of Wolverhampton residents to Oliver Cromwell during the Protectorate, dated 10 May 1654. This attributes the sums to the period immediately after the dissolution of the college, and it is not entirely clear from it when and for how long they held good: the funding had largely dried up by the time of the petition. The windfall for the parish ministry did not come not from the sale of prebendal lands, which was impossible because they were leased to Colonel Thomas Leveson. However, as Leveson was considered a royalist "delinquent," the lands were sequestrated by Parliament and the proceeds earmarked for the support of clergy. The records of the Committee for Compounding with Delinquents, which dealt with the sequestered property of royalists, show how the claims on the sequestered lands built up and the flow of funds reduced. From 1650 the Colonel's wife, Frances Leveson, who claimed to be a Parliamentarian, mounted an increasingly successful campaign for maintenance for herself and her children. Meanwhile, the creditors closed in: local man William Hayes demanding title to Heath Manor and Francis Blount of London in search of £200.

Thomas Leveson himself had fled to Bordeaux, where he lived well at the expense of the eccentric Armand de Bourbon, Prince of Conti, the provincial governor. Although he kept servants and horses, when he died in September 1652, his furniture had to be sold to pay for his funeral. In September 1653 Robert Leveson alleged that his father Thomas, who held the tithes of Upper Penn as well as St Peter's and 13 other churches, had already settled the estates on himself as early as 1640, before the civil war began. The augmentations to the parish clergy were suspended immediately while an enquiry was held. On 17 November, Leveson won his case and the sequestration of the family estates was discharged. The stream of funding was already in decline and now the ministers of those churches which had been receiving augmentations began to complain of serious hardship: Ralph Strettel of Shareshill, entitled to £100 but finding that he was paid only £10 for 1652 and £27 6s. for 1653 to supplement his pittance of 16 nobles; Charles Wynn of Penn, who had only £3 augmentation for the year, worried it might end; Edward Barton of Wednesbury, who had seven children and only ever received 6 months' worth of his £50 augmentation. So at Wolverhampton, Ambrose Sparry and his assistant, Richard Clayton, were among a host of claimants left impoverished by the return of the prebendal lands and other estates to the Levesons. They complained of the magnitude of the task they were expected to perform: "the town so swarms with Papists as to be called little Rome, and there are 20 gentry families of recusants, some of whom were so turbulent last summer that the justices had to call in a troop of horse." All of this was echoed in the petition by their supporters. In May 1654 it transpired that the County Committee had not even been informed of the discharge of Leveson's sequestration, so the meagre augmentations of which the clergy complained were actually overpayments. Fortunately the impoverished ministers were not asked to repay the excess.

=== 1660–1848: Decline and demise of the old order ===
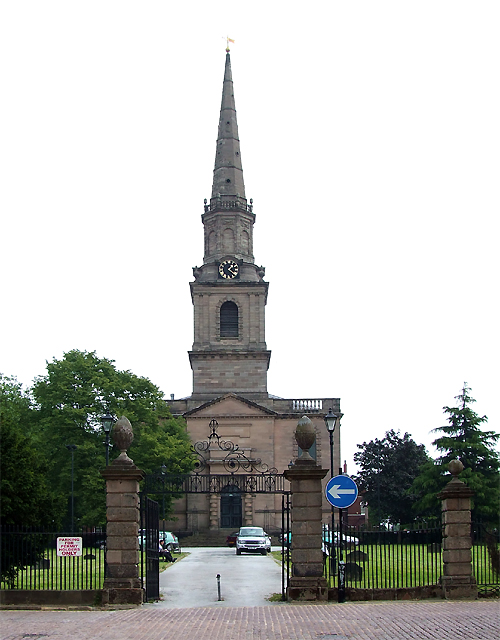
The Church of St John in the Square was originally built as a chapel-of-ease to relieve overcrowding at St Peter's in the 1750s.

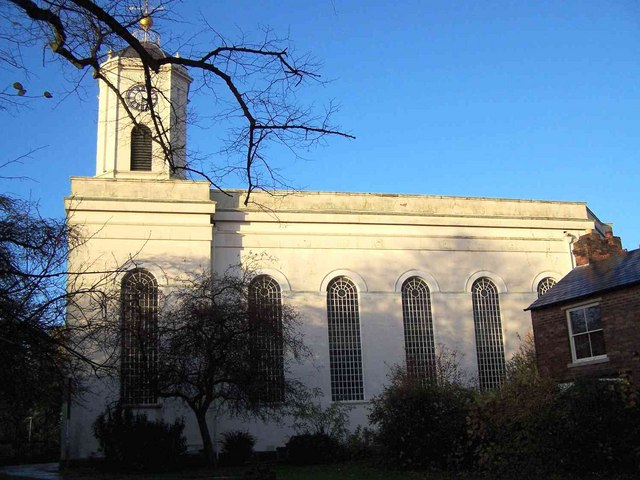
Bilston revolted against the dean's appointment of clergy in the 1730s and symbolised its independence of spirit by building its own chapel. The present St Leonard's church replaced the 18th-century building in 1826.

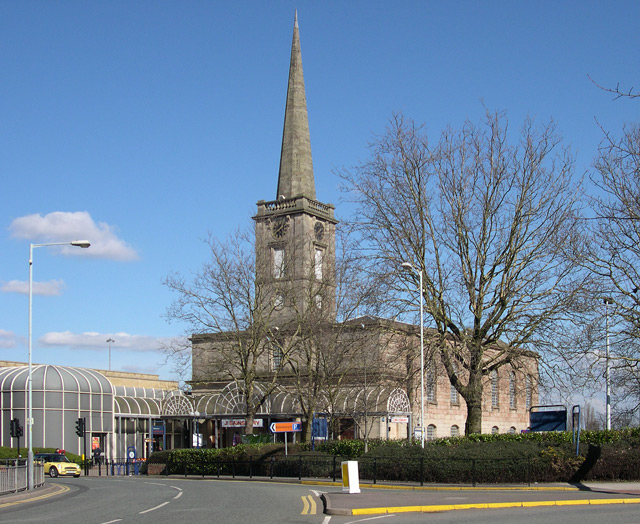
St George's church was built in a Neo-Classical style, already being superseded by Gothic Revival at the time. It relieved the growing overcrowding in churches but proved a short-lived success, as a church-building boom sponsored by the Evangelicals ringed the town centre with ample new seating. The building, long-derelict, was incorporated into a supermarket in the 1980s.

The Restoration of Charles II automatically brought the restoration of the college at St Peter's, as the legislation abolishing it was regarded as invalid. Everything was restored very quickly. However, the loss of the records at the hands of Leveson, whose family coincidentally had important claims on college property, was a serious problem for the restored institution and its financial position continued to be weak. Cesar Callendrine and Thomas Wren, son of Matthew Wren and prebendary of Willenhall, mounted a legal challenge to Leveson dominance in 1661. It quickly ran into problems and Joseph Hall's gains were lost. Callendrine was dead by the time the case was finally decided in 1667, with the Court of Chancery dismissing their claim and awarding Robert Leveson costs.

Leveson sold his Wolverhampton estates to the Earl of Bradford, his nephew, in 1705 and the college went to court again to recover its alienated lands. This time the case was dismissed immediately. Not until 1811 did the college finally abandon its attempts to recover its property - more than two and a half centuries after its loss. Meanwhile, Samuel de l'Angle, a Huguenot who was prebendary of Kinvaston 1684–93, had initiated a Chancery suit to recover his prebendal lands. After his death the claim was pursued to a successful conclusion by his son and executor. However, all the dependent chapels but Kinvaston were now very poorly funded and unable to attract able or dedicated ministers. They were still expected to contribute to the upkeep of St Peter's and to the expenses of the sacrist, who doggedly defended his income from burials and other rites. They were now starting to chafe at the bit. Bilston revolted against the dean's attempts to impose a curate twice – in 1730 and 1735 – and the congregation elected their own.

The population of Wolverhampton itself and of the towns to the east was growing rapidly as manufacturing took hold. Peniston Booth, a dean who actually spent some of his time at the deanery house in Wolverhampton, was sufficiently in touch with opinion to authorise the building of new chapels of ease at Wednesfield, Willenhall and Bilston. With considerably more persuasion, and after a major public campaign fronted by Lord Grey, he acquiesced in the building of a new chapel of ease in Wolverhampton itself. It was authorised by an act of Parliament, the Wolverhampton Chapel Act 1755 (28 Geo. 2. c. 34), and the fine Neo-Classical St John's Church, Wolverhampton quickly rose on a site enclosed in a square to the south of St Peter's.

The college, with its deanery and prebends, was increasingly proving a straitjacket for the Anglican Church in Wolverhampton. The increasing population was a challenge in itself, but it also brought social misery and discontent as the crowded housing of the Wolverhampton and the Black Country failed to keep up with demand. Increasing religious diversity was another consequence. There had been Protestant Dissenters since the Civil War, but their numbers were greatly increased by the preaching of Methodism: in 1761 John Wesley himself preached at an inn-yard in what he called "this furious town" of Wolverhampton. Catholic recusancy was strong in the surrounding countryside. Despite the Penal laws, in the 1730s the Giffard family of Brewood succeeded in building a Catholic chapel in the guise of a private house, just to the west of St Peter's. As Catholic Emancipation approached, this was rapidly expanded into a functioning Roman Catholic church. Already, distress in Ireland was bringing immigration and a large working class, Irish Catholic community, concentrated to the north of St Peter's in the slums of an area known as "Caribee Island".

In 1811 a special act of Parliament, the Dean of Windsor and Wolverhampton's Estate Act 1811 (51 Geo. 3. c. clxxxii), was passed to reform St Peter's church itself. The post of sacrist was replaced by that of perpetual curate. Three readerships were abolished and their income signed over to the curate. A fund was established from proceeds of mining on the deanery land to improve the income of the curate. This did not go far enough. The curate was still heavily dependent on fees from the dependent chapels and friction over this continued to sour relations. However, the curates initially performed their duties very much better than earlier sacrists and things were improved further by the building of a new chapel of ease in the town: St George's, another Neo-Classical structure, completed in 1830 to a design by James Morgan.

It was in connection with a possible post at St George's that William Dalton, an Evangelical Anglican clergyman from Ulster first visited Wolverhampton. He returned in 1835, after marrying Sarah Marsh, the widow of a Bilston ironmaster, to take up the living of St Paul's, yet another chapel of ease on the south-western edge of the town. Dalton began a lifelong campaign to build more churches to serve the growing population. Dalton's agitation had a venomously anti-Catholic edge, attacking both Anglo-Catholicism and Roman Catholicism, but his church-building campaign won wide support. It further undermined the relevance of the dean and the royal peculiar. St Peter's itself and all the new chapels already operated as parish churches in all but name, but were hampered by lack of funds. The deanery was a sinecure that took £600 a year out of the town - largely the product of coal mining on deanery lands.

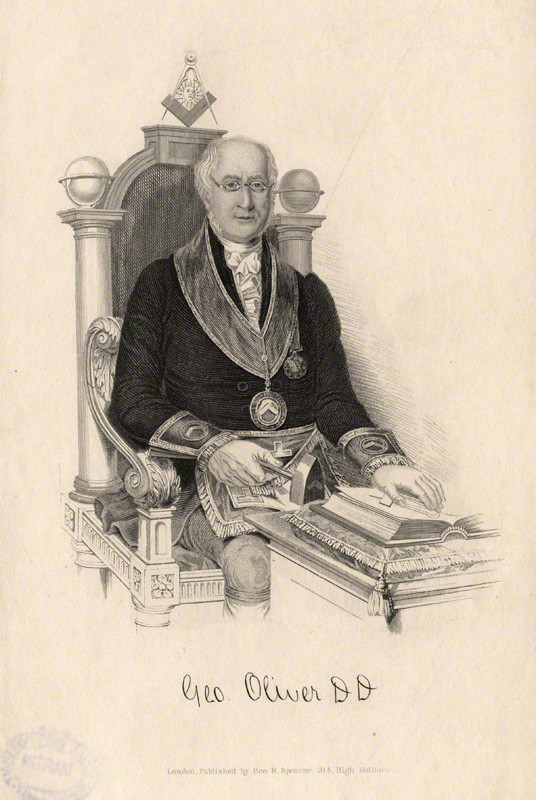
George Oliver

The radical Whig administration of the 1830s was determined to remedy a wide range of abuses at the local level. The establishment of elected municipal self-government for Wolverhampton and most of England's towns and cities came in 1836. This swept away the last vestiges of ecclesiastical influence in the politics of Wolverhampton and created a much stronger expectation of local accountability. In the same year, the Ecclesiastical Commissioners were established, aimed at rationalising the finances and structures of the Church of England, and charged with recommending further legislation to reform the Church. Henry Lewis Hobart, the Dean of Windsor and Wolverhampton, was generally considered a wealthy nonentity and had failed to win any real support at Court. The sacrist or perpetual curate, was Dr. George Oliver, appointed in 1834, who had a distinguished career in the Diocese of Lincoln before his appointment at Wolverhampton and continued as vicar of Scopwick in Lincolnshire until his death. A freemason who wrote widely on the craft, Oliver was remembered by some as "of a kind and genial disposition, charitable in the highest sense of the word." However, he seems also to have had a talent for controversy. VCH avers that in Wolverhampton he pursued "rather sordid and very public disputes" with other clergy. These involved clashes in the pulpit and the public prints with the clergy of St George's over burial and other fees, with Oliver countering every argument of his opponents with a new pamphlet, invariably headed a Candid Reply. His Masonic career was at times stormy: in 1840 he was suspended from his position as Deputy Grand Master of the Lincolnshire Province over his support for Robert Crucefix, a mason involved in controversy over care for aged and sick masons with Prince Augustus Frederick, Duke of Sussex, the Grand Master of the United Grand Lodge of England. As he was also a prolific author on medieval history, particularly important churches, it seems unlikely that Oliver had much time to devote to parochial work at St Peter's.

The old order was suppressed completely under the terms of legislation, variously referred to as the Cathedrals Act 1840 and the Ecclesiastical Commissioners Act 1840 (3 & 4 Vict. c. 113), but actually entitled An Act to carry into effect, with certain Modifications, the Fourth Report of the Commissioners of Ecclesiastical Duties and Revenues. Section 21 of the act decreed that the deanery should be suppressed, along with those of Middleham, Heytesbury and Brecon. Section 51 restricted the rights of any appointees to positions within the colleges but allowed the existing deans to continue in office until their deaths. The prebends were left vacant in readiness and, on Hobart's death in 1846, the deanery was wound up. In the same year Lord Lyndhurst, the Lord Chancellor, gave Oliver the rectory of South Hyckham, near Lincoln, and he subsequently resigned his Wolverhampton post, making way for John Dakeyne to be appointed temporary sacrist pending a full reorganisation. Dakeyne had been incumbent of St Benedict's Church, Lincoln and had defended the traditional doctrine of baptism in 1843, in a book dedicated to Lord Lyndhurst. He too was an active Freemason who had spoken in 1844 at a testimonial for Oliver, part of the address being used as a preface to some editions of Oliver's Book of the Lodge.

Wolverhampton Parish Act 1848
- Act of Parliament
- Parliament of the United Kingdom
- Long title: An Act to carry into effect the Arrangements of the Ecclesiastical Commissioners for England for making better Provision for the Cure of Souls in the Parish of Wolverhampton in the County of Stafford and Diocese of Lichfield.
- Citation: 11 & 12 Vict. c. 95
- Territorial extent: United Kingdom

Dates
- Royal assent: 31 August 1848
- Commencement: 31 August 1848 (Note: The Acts of Parliament (Commencement) Act 1793.)

Status: Current legislation

Text of statute as originally enacted

In 1848, a specific piece of legislation for St Peter's, the Wolverhampton Parish Act 1848 (11 & 12 Vict. c. 95), abolished the ancient college altogether and transferred all its assets to the Ecclesiastical Commissioners. They swiftly oversaw the establishment of a rectory for St Peter's and confirmed Dakeyne as rector. All the dependent chapels were turned into separate parish churches, each with its own vicar. From the available funds, the Commissioners were able to grant the rector a living of £750 a year, and to improve the incomes of all 13 of the other clergy involved, as well as to contribute to building repairs. St Peter's and all the newly established parishes became part of the Diocese of Lichfield, subject to the bishop as Ordinary.

=== Timeline ===
This summary is based on a University of Wolverhampton publication, supplemented by the Victoria County History.

- 994 – Lady Wulfrun gave lands (given to her by King Aethelred II) to the Church of St Mary at Heantune. Wulfrun + heantune = Wolvernehampton – the town is named Wolverhampton. The church is run by a college of canons, who are secular priests.
- 1066 – The Norman Conquest leads to the church being granted to Samson, a royal chaplain, who alienates its lands and gives it to Worcester cathedral priory.
- 1135 – The church enters a period of great turbulence in the anarchy of King Stephen's reign, with several changes of control.
- 1152-54 – The church emerges triumphant, recognised as a royal chapel and independent of Lichfield's diocesan control, constituted as a dean and prebendaries, newly dedicated to St Peter or St Peter and St Paul.
- 1203-05 – The college is dissolved because of corruption and abortive plans are laid to replace it with a Cistercian monastery. Tower crossing (oldest extant part of the church) constructed. College restored, now recognised as lord of the manor of Wolverhampton.
- 1258 – Right to hold a weekly market and an annual fair on the feast of St Peter and St Paul.
- 1263 – Autonomy of burgesses recognised.
- 1280 – Archbishop of Canterbury turned away at the doors of the church. Independence from Canterbury formally recognised.
- 1350? – Chapel of our Lady and St George is built.
- 1358 – Edward III orders an inspection because of notorious abuses at the church.
- 1440 – Nave roof raised to current height.
- 1450 – Stone pulpit built.
- 1479 – King Edward IV united the deaneries of Wolverhampton and Windsor in a single holder, establishing the royal peculiar. Deans and prebends are mostly absent and poorly paid curates do most of the work, as before.
- 1540 – Bells from Much Wenlock Priory installed to replace old bells (in 1729 more bells added to make a total of 10; in 1911 the frame replaced and bells recast).
- 1547 – The Reformation sweeps away the college and turns it into a parish church.
- 1550 – The canons alienate much of the college's property to the Leveson family on perpetual leases.
- 1553 – Queen Mary restores the college.
- 1560 – The college becomes an Anglican institution, unique in the Church of England.
- 1635 – Dean Christopher Wren calls in Archbishop Laud to purge Puritans and triumphantly consecrates an altar.
- 1642-43 – The church is damaged by Parliamentary troops, while Col. Leveson's royalists destroy all the college's records.
- 1646-60 – Under the Commonwealth, St Peter's is a parish church with Puritan incumbents.
- 1667 – The restored college loses the first of many actions to recover its property from the Levesons.
- 1755 – The building of St John's marks the end of St Peter's church's monopoly in the town, although it remains merely a chapel-at-ease for over a century.
- 1811 – St Peter's church is partially reformed with the appointment of a perpetual curate. The futile legal wrangle with the Levesons is abandoned.
- 1836 – Wolverhampton gains municipal self-government as a borough.
- 1840 – The Cathedrals Act 1840 declares the deanery and the royal peculiar abolished from the death of the current dean.
- 1846 – Dean Hobart dies and the deanery is suppressed.
- 1847 – St Peter's Collegiate School established adjacent to the church.
- 1848 – The college is wound up and St Peter's becomes a parish within the Lichfield Diocese, with its own Rector. The dependent chapels become new parishes, each with a vicar.
- 1860 – "Father" Henry Willis built a new organ (in 1882 the organ was enlarged; revamped with an electrical blowing installation in 1914; rebuilt in 1970, "restored" in 1983 and rebuilt in 2019)
- 1865 – Present chancel completed in decorated Gothic style
- 1937 – A civic and public appeal raises £10,000 in a few days for restoration of the tower and other important repairs.
- 1968 – Sanctuary re-panelled
- 1978 – Parish of Central Wolverhampton established: St Peter's with All Saints, St Chad and St Mark. Later, the two latter were amalgamated and St John in the Square was added. Team ministry established under leadership of the Rector.

== Architecture ==
View from the south-east, with the chancel in the foreground

The crossing tower

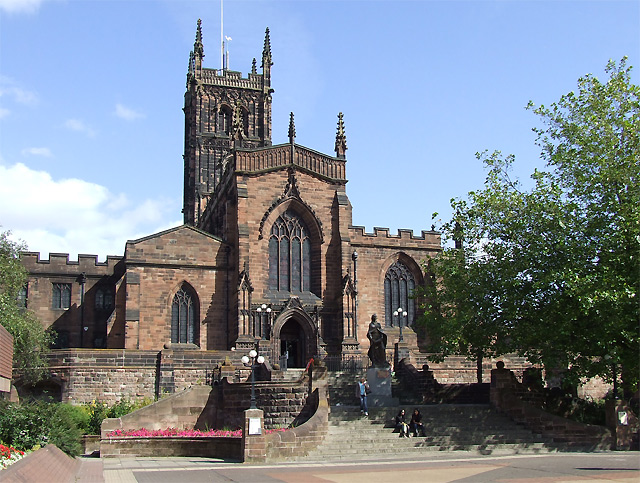
The west front of the nave

St Peter's Collegiate Church stands on an elevated promontory at the centre of Wolverhampton, around which the medieval settlement developed. Although the church's foundation is traditionally associated with Wulfrun's endowment of a minster in 994, no fabric of any 10th-century building is known to survive above ground. The present church incorporates successive phases of construction and alteration from the architecture of the High Middle Ages to the Gothic Revival of the 19th century. Despite this diversity of architectural history, the building is unified by its consistent use of red sandstone ashlar and overall Gothic appearance. It stands on a cruciform plan, comprising a six-bay aisled nave, a central crossing tower, north and south transepts, and an aisleless chancel terminating in a polygonal apse.

=== Medieval building ===
The earliest surviving fabric at St Peter's Church is found in the crossing and south transept, which the architectural historian Nikolaus Pevsner dated to the late 13th century. However, in his 1852 report on the condition of the building, the architect Ewan Christian dated the lower part of the central tower and most of the south transept to the beginning of the 14th century, regarding the south aisle wall and the western wall as broadly contemporary. The south transept retains angle buttresses, an embattled parapet and a five-light east window. Christian also attributed the buttressed south porch to the Decorated Gothic style of the early 14th century, with its panelled parapet, crocketed pinnacles and a moulded entrance arch.

The north transept derives from a later medieval phase of building. Christian considered it, together with its roof, to date from the end of the 14th or beginning of the 15th century; Pevsner nevertheless assigns it to the late 15th century. Its original windows are unusual in that they lack conventional mullions or tracery, each being divided into two parts by a substantial central pier. Its interior retains a moulded tie-beam roof, while its north and east elevations have round-headed windows inserted in the 17th century.

The nave arcades, comprising five bays supported on octagonal piers, also date to the 15th century and might be part of the same building programme as the north transept. Again, Pevsner disagreed with Christian on the precise dating, Christian assigning them to the early part of the century and Pevsner suggesting a mid-to-late 15th century date. The pulpit, which is integral to the second pier on the south side of the nave, is partly carved from the same block of stone as the adjoining pillar and would have been made at the same time. The upper part of the central tower is likely to have been built soon after. It has three stages and a north-east stair turret; its upper stages incorporate panels with quatrefoil friezes, while the embattled parapet is finished with crocketed pinnacles. The second stage has two-light windows and the belfry stage paired two-light openings.

The final major medieval phase of building comprised the clerestory of the nave and south transept, which Christian dated to the close of the 15th century. The nave clerestory has paired two-light windows with transoms and Perpendicular Gothic tracery. The aisles were given embattled parapets and were provided with new Perpendicular Gothic windows. The west front has a moulded entrance beneath a crocketed ogee hood, above which is a four-light Decorated Gothic window with a similar hood. Internally, the nave has a 15th-century timber roof with moulded tie beams, carved spandrels and a panelled ceiling decorated with bosses. The south transept retains a late-15th-century moulded tie-beam roof, while the north transept roof is dated by Christian to the late 14th or early 15th century.

=== 17th century works ===
The fabric of the building suffered greatly during the English Civil War, when Royalist troops were quartered in the church and its roof was removed. The chancel was substantially remodelled in 1682 following damage during the Civil War, though this no longer survives. 17th century tie-beams survive at the crossing, probably from the same period of works. Later views depict the 17th century chancel as a plain, rectangular Jacobean structure, contrasting in style and scale with the surviving medieval fabric of the church that stood to the west. In his 1852 report, Christian remarked that the chancel was unworthy of the medieval church and that little remained to indicate the character of its predecessor. He would demolish and rebuild it during the following decade.

=== 19th century restoration ===
By the mid-19th century the church had deteriorated considerably, in part because of the decay of its soft red sandstone. This coincided with a wider movement for the restoration of medieval churches, influenced by the Gothic Revival and the Ecclesiological Movement. In 1848 the church also ceased to function as a Royal peculiar and became parochial. It was against this background that Christian was commissioned to prepare his 1852 report on the fabric of the building, not only describing its deteriorated condition but also setting out the measures required for its full restoration.

Having delivered his 1852 report to church authorities, Christian was commissioned to undertake a prolonged programme of restoration and rebuilding at St Peter's Church, beginning with consolidation of the surviving medieval fabric. In 1862 the 17th-century chancel was demolished in order to make way for a much enlarged Gothic Revival replacement to Christian's own design. Work on its construction was completed in 1865. Although the church's status as a Royal peculiar had ceased to exist, Christian designed the new chancel with an elongated choir fit for a medieval college of canons, terminating in a seven-bay polygonal apse. Acknowledging in his 1852 report the lack of evidence for how the chancel had appeared in its medieval form, the design was Christian's own interpretation rather than a strict replica. Nevertheless, in an attempt to introduce architectural unity, Christian worked in the Decorated Gothic style of the surviving 14th century fabric. The external elevations of the chancel are articulated by offset buttresses surmounted by crocketed gables and gargoyles, beneath an openwork parapet. The apse has two-light windows, while the chancel is lit by three-light windows with flowing tracery. Internally, the apse has a vaulted ceiling supported on shafts with carved angel and foliate capitals; the chancel has a hammerbeam roof with carved angel corbels and a decorated cornice.

=== 20th century developments ===
The tower was restored in the early years of the 20th century by Wolverhampton-based architect F.T Beck. Perished stones and pointing were renewed and woodwork of louvres replaced. The weather vane was also renewed, when the 17th century weather cock was bought inside the church. In 1909 the Church was fitted with electric light. A redesigned high altar and new panelling on the sanctuary walls was dedicated in memory of Canon John Brierley in December 1967. A processional cross was also given in his memory.

== Fixtures and fittings ==
=== Furnishings ===
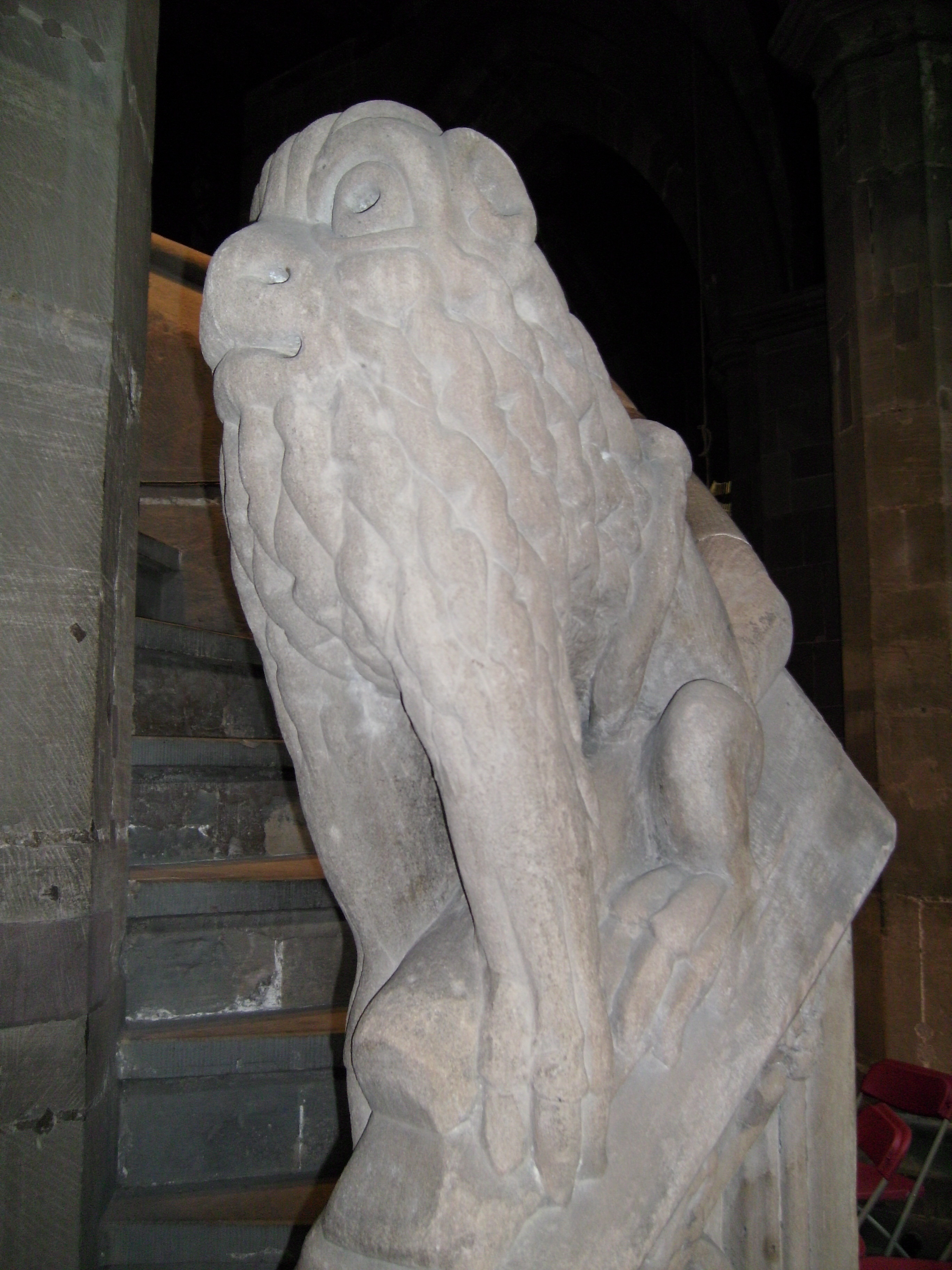
Carved lion on balustrade of the 15th-century pulpit

The richly carved 15th-century stone pulpit stands among the finest of the medieval furnishings preserved at St Peter's Church. The podium itself is panelled with tracery and blind arches, raised on a stem that is attached to the second nave pier on the south side of the church. It is accessed by an integral stone staircase that winds itself around the pier. Its parapet is also embellished with tracery, while a stylised crouching lion on the balustrade provides sculptural interest at the foot of the stair. Christian records in his 1852 report how the pulpit is partly carved from the same block of stone as the pillar around which it wraps, dating construction to the early 15th century. More recent scholarship, included in the church's heritage listing, suggests a date from the mid-to-late 1500s. Nearby, the octagonal font dates from 1480 and is decorated with carved figures.

The medieval baptismal font, which has an octagonal bowl set on matching octagonal stem, has been dated to c. 1480. The stem is decorated with eight carved figures set in traceried arches, one to each face. The bowl shows the bell of St Peter on one face and heraldic devices on the others.

The carved oak choir stalls in the chancel have traceried fronts, plainly carved misericords and carved angel finials, some of which have been dated to the 15th century and are believed to have originated at Lilleshall Abbey. Is so, they were presumably dispersed following the abbey's suppression during the Dissolution of the monasteries.

Following the rebuilding of the chancel in the 1860s, the north and south walls were decorated with a series of mural paintings by Heaton, Butler and Bayne, illustrating episodes from the Ministry of Jesus. These were recorded in the Wolverhampton Red Book and Directory of 1914. However, no longer in situ, it appears that they were removed or covered when the chancel was repanelled in 1967 as part of a broader reordering.

=== Memorials ===
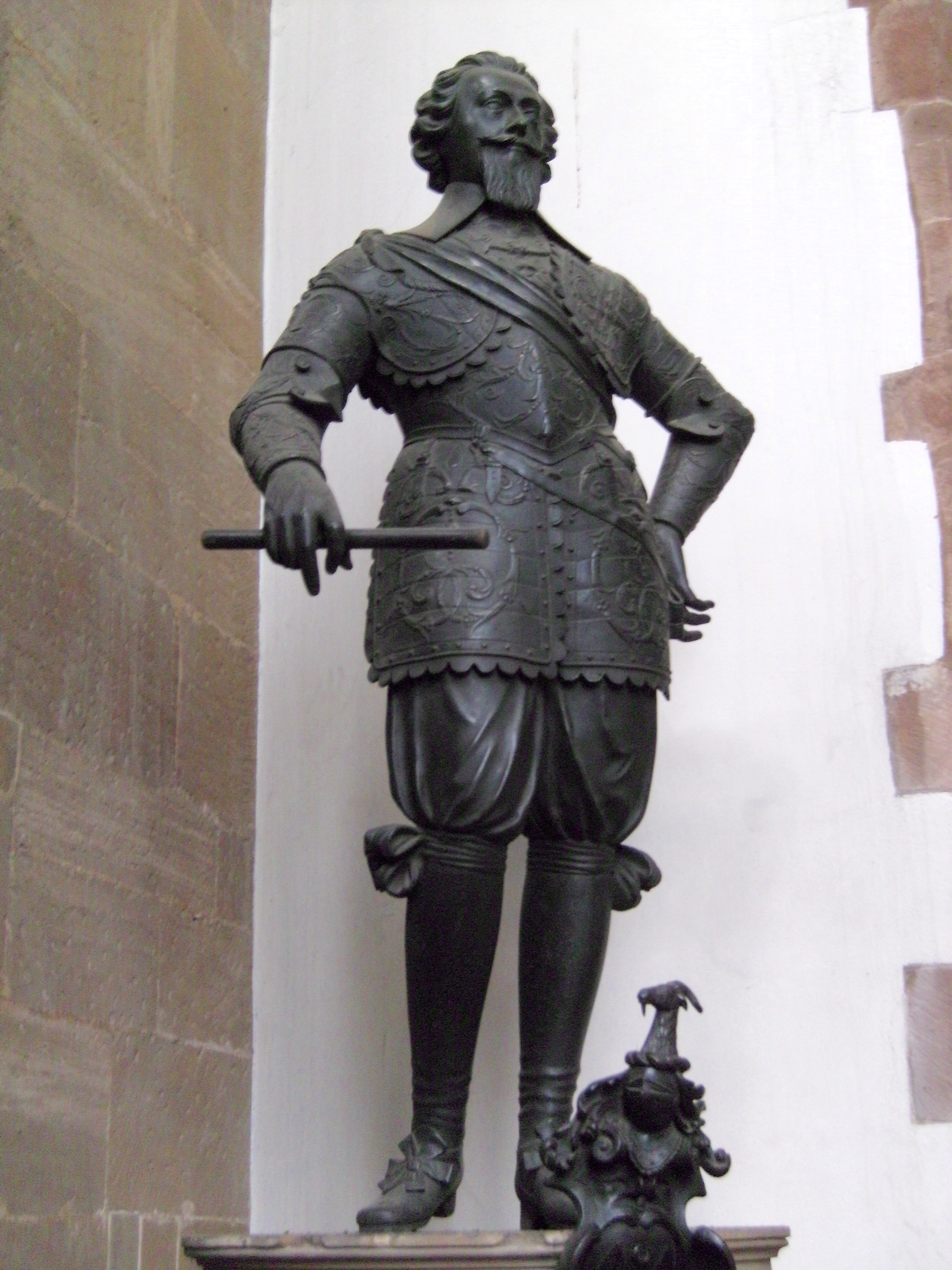
Bronze sculpture of Vice-Admiral Sir Richard Leveson by Hubert Le Sueur, 1633

The church contains several important funerary monuments of the 16th and 17th century belonging to the Leveson and Lane families, both important local landholders and benefactors to the church. The south transept preserves an alabaster chest tomb with recumbent effigies of John Leveson (d. 1575) and his wife Joyce. The sides of the tomb are decorated with images of mourners and armorial shields. It has been attributed to Robert Royley of Burton on Trent. Nearby, the bronze sculpture of Vice-Admiral Sir Richard Leveson of Lilleshall (d. 1605) was cast by the French sculptor Hubert Le Sueur in 1633. One of the principal sculptors of the age, Le Sueur is best known for his equestrian statue of King Charles I which stands at Charing Cross in London. The Wolverhampton sculpture was originally part of a larger funerary monument of black marble to the Leveson family positioned in the chancel. The sculpture, plus two bronze putti from the same ensemble, were separated from the original composition following its desecration during the Civil War. According to the account published in The Wolverhampton Red Book in 1914, Lady Leveson rescued the bronze effigy from destruction and concealed it until the Stuart Restoration.

In the north transept is a second 16th century alabaster chest tomb belonging to Thomas Lane (d. 1582). It has also been attributed to Royley and, like the slightly earlier tomb of John Leveson, features two recumbent effigies of Thomas and his wife Catherine, with the sides once again carved with mourners and heraldic decoration. Also in the north transept is a large marble and alabaster wall monument to Colonel John Lane of Bentley (d. 1667). The carved panel at the base of the monument depicts classical emblems and accoutrements of war. It has been attributed to the sculptor Jasper Latham.A Royalist, Lane gave refuge to King Charles II at his estate following his defeat at the Battle of Worcester in 1651. Following the Restoration, Lane served as Member of Parliament for Lichfield.

=== Stained glass ===
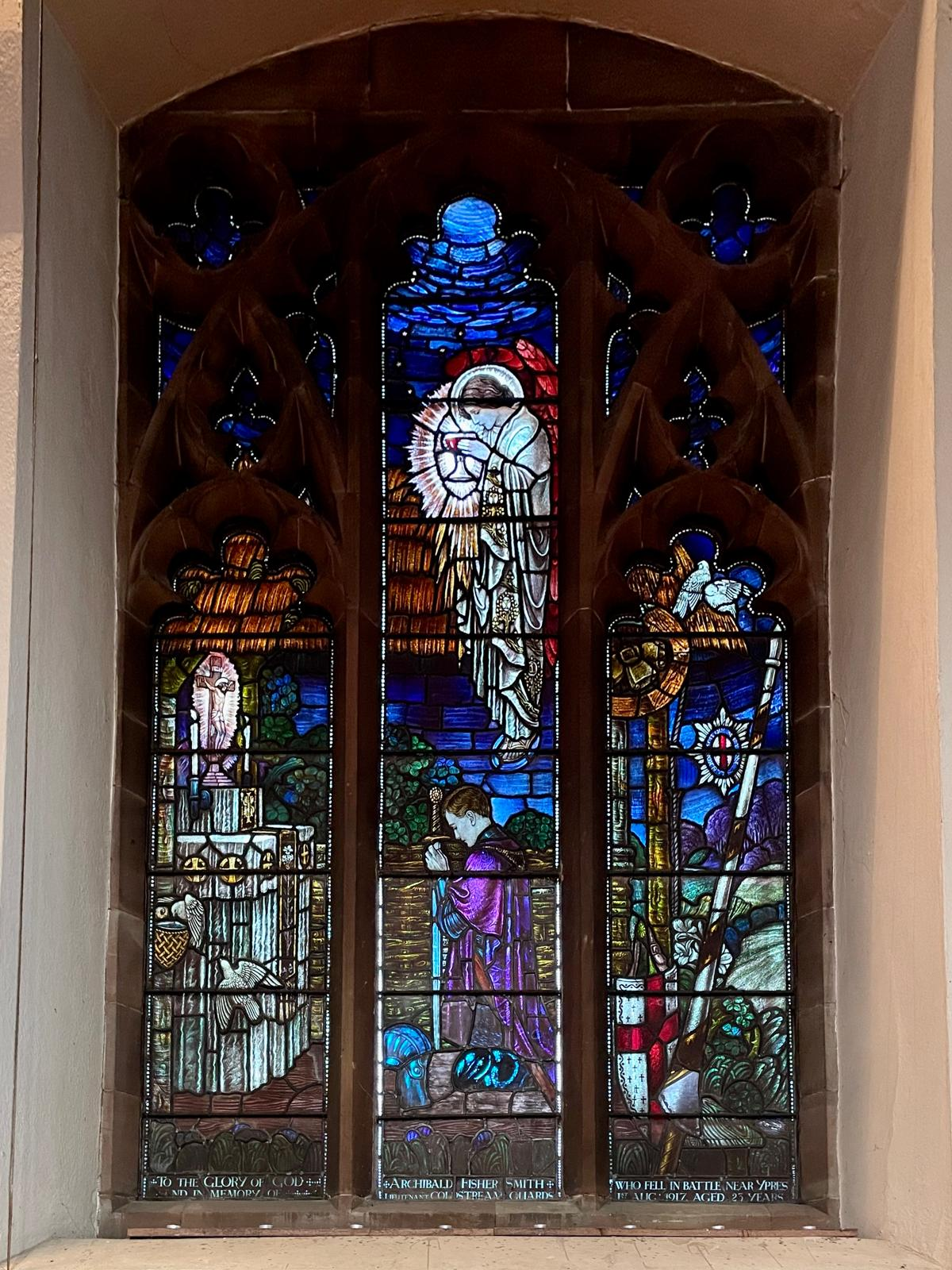
Window by Archibald John Davies depicting Sir Galahad before the image of Christ, c.1920.

The church contains an extensive collection of 19th- and early 20th century stained glass. The west window was installed in 1855, during Christian's early phase of restorative work on the church. The large window was made by William Wailes and depicts Moses, Joshua, Gideon and David across its four lights. It was installed in memory of the Arthur Wellesley, 1st Duke of Wellington, who had died in 1853.

The seven windows of the apse form a single commission, given in memory of Anne Parke, wife of the Wolverhampton bookseller and printer William Parke. Dating from around 1868, shortly after the rebuilding of the chancel, they were commissioned from the workshop of Michael O'Connor (1801–1867), an Irish-born stained-glass artist who established a studio in London in 1845, which was continued after his death by members of his family.

Contemporary accounts detail other memorial windows commissioned for the church, among them examples produced by several prominent Victorian stained-glass firms, including Heaton, Butler and Bayne, Hardman & Co., Clayton and Bell and C.E. Kempe Studios. Their commemorations include Bishop John Lonsdale (d. 1867) and the Wolverhampton industrialist Charles Benjamin Mander (d. 1878).

The church also contains two windows in the Arts and Crafts style made by Archibald John Davies of the Bromsgrove Guild of Applied Arts. The Sarah Eliza Brevitt memorial window, erected in 1912, depicts Lady Wulfrun in the act of Christian Charity, distributing gifts to the needy, surrounded by floral decoration, birds and angels. A second window by Davies, depicting Sir Galahad kneeling before the image of Christ, was installed in 1919 to commemorate Lieutenant Alan Archibald Fisher-Smith, an officer in the Coldstream Guards who was killed in action near Ypres on 1 August 1917.

=== Clock ===
A clock was installed in 1826 by John Moore & Sons of Clerkenwell. The principal wheel was 2 feet (0.61 m) in diameter, the pendulum was 10 feet (3.0 m) long and the weight of the whole was about a 1½ tons. The striking hammer weighed 28 pounds (13 kg) and struck the great bell of 38 cwt and was reportedly heard at a distance of 4 miles (6.4 km).

This clock was replaced in 1896 with a new one by John Smith of Derby in memory of the late Prebendary John Thomas Jeffcock, rector from 1877-1894.

=== Bells ===
The bells of St Peter's are the second oldest complete ring of 12 in the country and third oldest in the world, all twelve cast in 1911 by Gillett & Johnston of Croydon.

Five bells are known to have existed at St Peter's in 1553. In 1698 a new 23 cwt. ring of eight was cast by Abraham Rudhall I. In 1740 Henry Bagley III of Chacombe cast a large ‘funeral’ (or hour) bell of some 35 cwt. In 1827 the eight were augmented to ten by Thomas Mears. The ten ringing bells were rehung by Barwells in 1889 and the seventh was recast in 1895 by Mears & Stainbank after cracking during a peal attempt.

The bells, including the hour bell, were recast and two new trebles added to produce a new ring of twelve by Gillett & Johnston. This was their first complete ring of twelve, to be followed by Coventry in 1927, Croydon in 1936 and Halifax in 1952. They were tuned on the 5 tone Simpson Principle in the key of C sharp major. Gillett also provided a new single-tier steel and iron H-frame with new fittings throughout. The clock chime was connected to the 3rd, 4th, 5th and 8th and the clock generally rearranged. They were rung for the first time as 12 for the coronation of King George V after a silence of three years. The front eight were subsequently rehung in 1977 and the tenor in 1985.

In April 2000 maintenance work was carried out. The 9th, 10th and 11th were rehung on new bearings and the pulley on the 10th was renewed. The 12 ductile-iron clappers were replaced by the original, overhauled wrought-iron clappers and other minor works carried out. All work was carried out by Whitechapel Bell Foundry of London.

The bells are rung twice weekly, on Mondays for practice and for the main Sunday service.

== Music ==
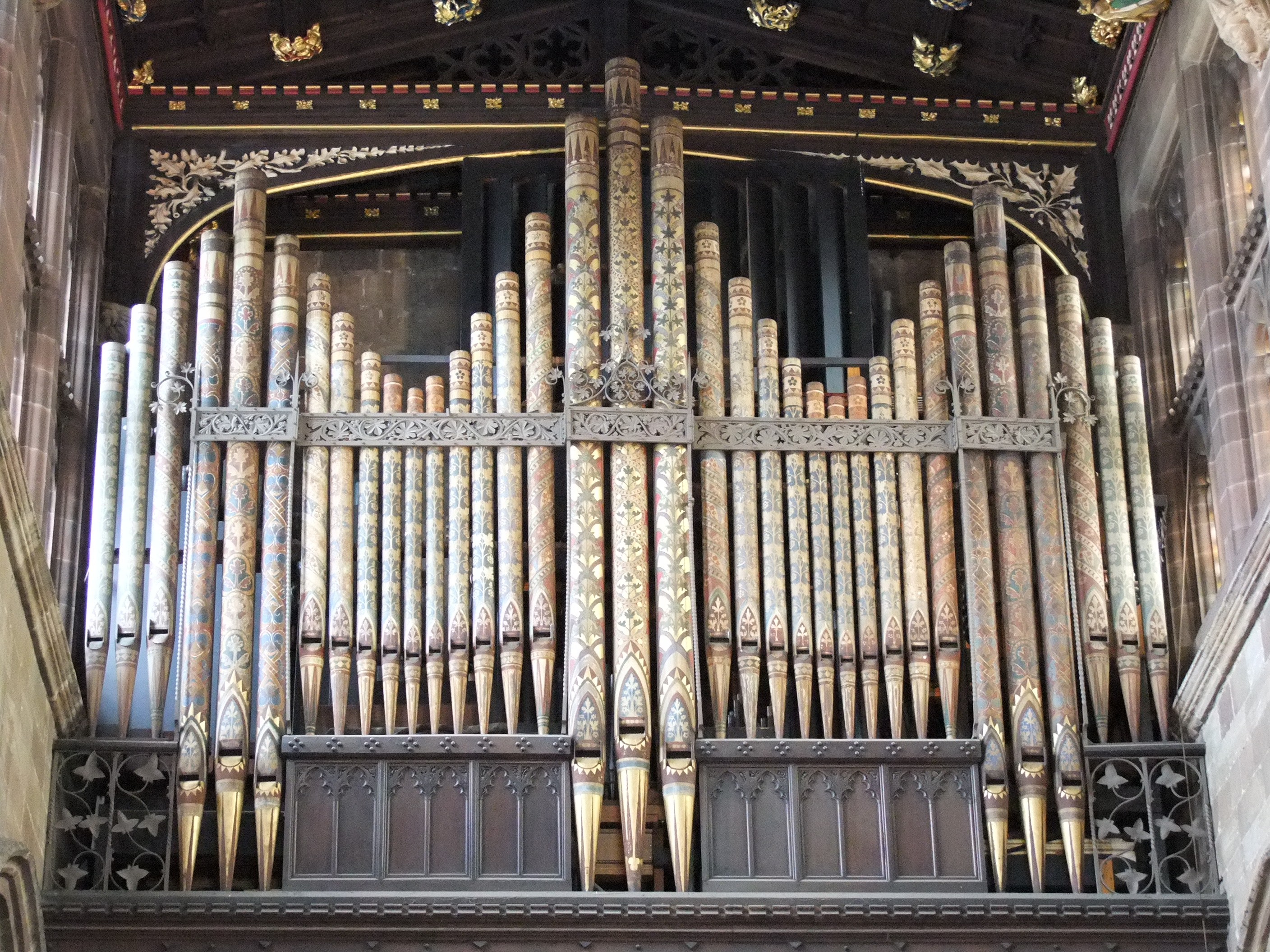
The organ of St Peter's Collegiate Church, Wolverhampton

The three-manual Father Willis organ, was built in 1860. A campaign to raise almost £300,000 towards its restoration was launched in 2008. The restoration work, designed to return the organ to its former glory after the wear and tear of near-daily use, was completed by Michael Farley Organ Builders in 2019.

On Saturday 25 September 2010 a concert of Elgar's greatest pieces was held at the church which included the very first football chant, He Banged The Leather for Goal, written by Elgar himself, in respect of Wolves star of the time, Billy Malpass. The concert was a joint venture between the church and Wolverhampton Wanderers to raise funds for the organ appeal and to firm the link that Elgar had between respective organisations. Elgar was a Wolves fan and cycled from Malvern (a good 40 miles approx) to watch the Wolves with close friend Dora Penny, daughter of then St Peter's Church Rector Revd Penny. St Peter's director of music Peter Morris said: "We wanted to celebrate the connection between Elgar and the church, so we got in touch with Wolves and it just grew. "We knew about Elgar’s connection with the club because the rector’s daughter Dora Penny used to write about him going to watch them when he came to visit."

There is a strong choral tradition: more than 40 children and young people are involved in the Music at St Peter's, along with Lay Clerks and choral scholars. There are separate boys' and girls' choirs, which sing at a Cathedral during the Summer holidays. The Boys' Choir, Lay Clerks and choral scholars sang at Lincoln Cathedral in 2007, York Minster in 2008, Norwich Cathedral in 2009, Rochester Cathedral in 2010, Ely Cathedral in 2011, Wells Cathedral in 2012, Chichester Cathedral in 2013, Ripon Cathedral in 2014, Durham Cathedral 2015, Edinburgh Cathedral in 2016, Salisbury Cathedral in 2017, Chester Cathedral in 2018 and Durham Cathedral again in 2019. The girls choir, Lay Clerks and choral scholars sang at Chester Cathedral in 2007, Chichester Cathedral in 2008 and 2010, Carlisle Cathedral in 2009, Canterbury Cathedral in 2011, Truro Cathedral in 2012, Salisbury Cathedral in 2013, Exeter Cathedral in 2014, Canterbury Cathedral in 2015, Edinburgh Cathedral in 2016, Canterbury again in 2017, York Minster in 2018 and Winchester Cathedral in 2019. The full choirs sang at Truro Cathedral in 2021, Wells Cathedral in 2022 and Lincoln Cathedral in 2023. Other recent singing has taken place in Gloucester Cathedral, Westminster Abbey, St George's Chapel, Windsor Castle, St Paul's Cathedral, The Royal Albert Hall (at the Proms) and Symphony Hall.

In 2023 the choir was invited to record its first Choral Evensong for BBC Radio Three. The service was recorded on 3rd June 2023 and broadcast for the feast of St Peter on Wednesday 28th June 2023 and again on Sunday 2nd July.

The church has been involved with the Choristers Outreach Programme of the Choir Schools Association and Sing Up which takes choristers into Primary Schools in the city to help the singing programmes in schools.

The assistant organists are Elli-Mae McGlone, Toby Barnard, Dr. David Rendell (Organist Emeritus) & Peter Morris (Organist Emeritus).

=== List of organists ===
- Mr. G. Hay ????- 1836 - 1842 - ????
- Thomas S. Hayward ca. 1860 - 1870 (afterwards organist of Blackburn Parish Church)
- Arthur Henry Mann 1870–1871
- Isaac Roper 1874–1908
- Frederick Harold Houldershaw 1908–1944
- Sidney Campbell 1943–1947
- Charles Leslie Parker Hutchings 1947–1964
- David Jones 1964–1970
- Brian Armfield 1971–1979
- Andrew Newberry 1979–1983
- Timothy C. Storey 1984–1993
- Alistair Pow 1994–1998
- Gary Cole 1998–2001
- Nicholas P. Johnson 2001–2003
- Peter Morris 2003–2018
- Harry Castle (acting) 2016-2017
- Callum Alger (acting) 2018-2019
- Hamish Dustagheer 2019-2020
- Callum Alger 2020-2024
- Louis Stockton 2025-2026

== St Peter's Gardens ==
View of the church from St Peter's Gardens, with the Horsman Fountain in the foreground. The Harris Memorial, 1920 war memorial and Wolverhampton Pillar can also be seen

St Peter's Gardens occupy the land immediately surrounding the church that once belonged to the churchyard. The gardens were created in stages during the late 19th and early 20th centuries, the first section, beside Lichfield Street, laid out from 1890 as part of a road widening programme. A second phase followed between 1906 and 1907, when formal gardens and a broad paved terrace, known as Lich Gates, were created to the west of the church. The remaining churchyard, immediately around the building, was closed in 1936; its headstones and tombs were removed and the land incorporated into the gardens. The gardens, which were restored between 1996 and 2004, contain a number of ancient and modern monuments significant to the history of the church and the wider civic society of Wolverhampton:

- The Wolverhampton Pillar, an Anglo-Saxon cross shaft, stands a few metres south of the church. Approximately 4.2m high, the sandstone column tapers towards a capital with a socket for the missing cross-head. Its heavily-weathered carved surface is divided into seven bands of ornament, including vine scrolls, animals, cable moulding, acanthus and latticework. A scheduled ancient monument, its listing gives a putative date of manufacture as the late 9th or 10th century.
- The Bargain Stone is an unusual carved sandstone slab that stands end on, just south of the church chancel. Much weathered, its original function - should it have had any at all - remains uncertain. Pierced by a hole toward the top, local tradition holds that the medieval merchants of Wolverhampton sealed their transactions by shaking hands through the opening. While more romance than established fact, the story has become part of the lore of Wolverhampton.
- The Horsman Fountain, erected in 1894, stands at the southern entrance to the gardens. It commemorates Philip Horsman, a local benefactor associated with the foundation of Wolverhampton Art Gallery and the Wolverhampton and Staffordshire Eye Infirmary. Constructed of ashlar on a granite base, it has a hexagonal plinth decorated with six dolphins supporting a gadrooned bowl. Above this, a shaft ornamented with foliage, masks and figures of children supports a second bowl and fountain head. It is a Grade II listed structure.
- The Harris Memorial, a bronze bust erected in 1917–19, commemorates Able Seaman Douglas Morris Harris, a wireless operator killed in the Adriatic Sea on 15 May 1917. Designed by Robert Jackson Emerson, it also features a bronze relief depicting Harris at his wireless equipment aboard the crippled vessel Floandi, where he remained at his post transmitting messages while under fire, action for which he was posthumously Mentioned in Dispatches. The memorial is Grade II listed.
- A Portland stone war memorial of 1920 stands on the southern side of St Peter's Gardens. It takes the form of a crucifix on a stepped base, flanked by curved walls terminating in piers bearing inscriptions commemorating the armed services. It is also Grade II listed.
- The Wolverhampton Cenotaph, situated on the western approach to the church at Lich Gates, is a sandstone memorial erected in 1922. Designed by William Charles Holland King, it consists of a column surmounted by figures representing a soldier, sailor and airman, together with St George and the dragon. The memorial now commemorates the men and women of Wolverhampton who died in both of the world wars.
- A bronze statue of Lady Wulfrun stands at the western entrance to the church. Surmounting a granite pedestal, she is depicted holding the charter associated with her grant of land at Heantun to the religious foundation from which Wolverhampton developed. An extract from the charter is inscribed on the steps below. It was presented to the people of Wolverhampton by the Express & Star to mark the newspaper's centenary in 1974, who commissioned it from the Wolverhampton-born sculptor Sir Charles Wheeler, former President of the Royal Academy of Arts. Wheeler's final sculpture, he died before it was unveiled.
- A lit candle carved from the trunk of a felled cedar tree, inspired by Wolverhampton's motto 'Out of darkness cometh light'. The carved candlestick on which the candle stands is similar to the nearby Wolverhampton Pillar. The sculpture was carved in situ by local artist Robot Cossey and unveiled in September 2025.

== Today ==
Worship is in the High church tradition of the Church of England. Vestments, reservation and the sacrament of reconciliation are all part of its tradition with incense used at festival services. Sunday services usually comprise Holy Communion, Choral Eucharist, and Choral Evensong. Choral Evensong is also sung on Wednesdays at 5.15pm.

St. Peter's is open on weekdays and during services on Sundays. There is also a book shop within the church.

The church has strong links with St Peter's Collegiate Academy, which, although founded adjacent to the church in 1847, is now located at Compton Park, along with St Edmund's Catholic Academy and the Wolverhampton Wanderers FC training ground.

== Lists of Incumbents ==
=== Rectors of St Peter's Collegiate Church ===
After the suppression of the deanery, a new sacrist, John Dakeyne, was appointed in 1847, with a view to making him rector on the winding up of the college. This duly occurred in the following year.

- John Dakeyne, 1848
- John Iles, 1860
- John Jeffcock, 1877
- Alfred Penny, 1895
- Joseph Stockley, 1919
- Robert Hodson, 1929
- John Brierley, 1935
- Francis Cocks, 1965
- John Ginever, 1970
- John Hall-Matthews, 1990
- David Frith, 2003
- David Wright, 2009
- Jeremy Dussek, 2026

== See also ==
- Bishop of Wolverhampton
- Lichfield Cathedral

== Bibliography ==
- Barrow, J. S., ed. (2002). Fasti Ecclesiae Anglicanae 1066–1300. Vol. 8, Hereford Diocese. Institute for Historical Research.
- Bateson, Mary; Costambeys, Marios. "Samson". Oxford Dictionary of National Biography (online ed.). Oxford University Press. doi:10.1093/ref:odnb/24600. (Subscription, Wikipedia Library access or UK public library membership required.)
- Bliss, W. H., ed. (1893). Calendar of Papal Registers Relating To Great Britain and Ireland. Vol. 1. London: HMSO.
- Blois, Peter of (1847). Giles, J. A. (ed.). Petri Blesensis Bathoniensis Archidiaconi Opera Omnia. Vol. 1. Oxford: Parker.
- Blois, Peter of (1847). Giles, J. A. (ed.). Petri Blesensis Bathoniensis Archidiaconi Opera Omnia. Vol. 2. Oxford: Parker.
- Bridgeman, C. G. O. (1916). William Salt Archaeological Society (ed.). "Staffordshire Pre-Conquest Charters". Collections for a History of Staffordshire. 1916. London: 67–137.
- Bridgett, Thomas Edward (1908). Thurston, Herbert (ed.). A History of the Holy Eucharist in Great Britain. London: Burns and Oates.
- Bruce, John, ed. (1866). Calendar of State Papers, Domestic Series, of the Reign of Charles I. Vol. 1635–1636. London: Longman.
- Bruce, John, ed. (1869). Calendar of State Papers, Domestic Series, of the Reign of Charles I. Vol. 1637–1638. London: Longman.
- "The Clergy of the Church of England Database 1540–1835". King's College, London.
- Coggeshall, Ralph of (1875). Stevenson, Joseph (ed.). Chronicon Anglicanum. London: Longman.
- Coulton, Barbara (2010). Regime and Religion: Shrewsbury 1400–1700. Little Logaston: Logaston Press. ISBN 978-1-906663-47-6.
- Dakeyne, John Osmond (1843). Baptismal Regeneration. London: Rivington.
- Cronne, H. A.; Davis, R. H. C., eds. (1968). Regesta Regum Anglo-Normannorum. Vol. 3. Oxford: Oxford University Press.
- Davis, H. W. C.; Whitwell, R. J., eds. (1913). Regesta Regum Anglo-Normannorum. Vol. 1. Oxford: Oxford University Press.
- Delisle, Léopold; Berger, Élie, eds. (1916). Recueil des Actes de Henri II. Vol. 1. Paris: Imprimerie nationale.
- Jeff Denton; et al., eds. (2014). "Taxatio". HRI Digital. HRI Online, Sheffield University. Archived from the original on 29 June 2016.
- William Dugdale (1830). "Monasticon Anglicanum 6". Gallica. Bibliothèque nationale de France.
- Duignan, William Henry (1888). The Charter of Wulfrún to the monastery at Hamtun (Wolverhampton). Wolverhampton: John Steen.
- "The Electronic Sawyer: Online catalogue of Anglo-Saxon charters". King's College, London. Archived from the original on 21 August 2017.
- Everett, Mary Anne, ed. (1882). Calendar of State Papers, Domestic Series. Vol. 1655–56. London: Longman.
- Everett, Mary Anne, ed. (1892). Calendar of the Proceedings of the Committee for Compounding, &c., 1643-1660. Vol. 4. London: HMSO.
- Eyton, R. W. (1881). William Salt Archaeological Society (ed.). "The Staffordshire Pipe Rolls of the reigns of Richard I and King John". Collections for a History of Staffordshire. 2. London: Harrison: 1–177.
- Firth, C. H.; Rait, R. S., eds. (1911). Acts and Ordinances of the Interregnum, 1649–1660. London: Institute of Historical Research.
- Fletcher, Richard (1997). The Conversion of Europe: from Paganism to Christianity 371–1386 AD. London: HarperCollins. ISBN 0002552035.
- G C Baugh, W L Cowie, J C Dickinson, Duggan A P, A K B Evans, R H Evans, Una C Hannam, P Heath, D A Johnston, Hilda Johnstone, Ann J Kettle, J L Kirby, R Mansfield and A Saltman (1970). Greenslade, M. W.; Pugh, R. B. (eds.). A History of the County of Stafford. Vol. 3. London: British History Online.
- Greenway, Diana E., ed. (1991). Fasti Ecclesiae Anglicanae 1066–1300. Vol. 4, Salisbury Diocese. Institute for Historical Research.
- Hamilton, William Douglas, ed. (1880). Calendar of State Papers, Domestic Series, of the Reign of Charles I. Vol. 1640. London: Longman.
- Hamilton, William Douglas, ed. (1882). Calendar of State Papers, Domestic Series, of the Reign of Charles I. Vol. 1640–41. London: Longman.
- Hall, Joseph (1808). Pratt, Josiah (ed.). Works of the Right Reverend Father in God, Joseph Hall, D.D. Vol. 1. London: Williams and Smith.
- Thomas Duffus Hardy, ed. (1837). "Rotuli Chartarum". BSB. Bayerischen Staatsbibliothek.
- Historic England (2016). "Church of St Peter (1282467)". National Heritage List for England.
- Hubbard, William Lines; Green, Janet M., eds. (1908). "Musical Biographies, Volume 2". The American History and Encyclopedia of Music. Vol. 6. Toledo: Irving Squire.
- Jacob, E. F. (1961). "3". The Fifteenth Century. Oxford University Press. pp. 96–98. ISBN 978-0198217145.
- Jones, B., ed. (1963). Fasti Ecclesiae Anglicanae 1300–1541. Vol. 6, Northern Province (York, Carlisle and Durham). Institute for Historical Research.
- Kemble, John M., ed. (1845). Codex Diplomaticus Aevi Saxonici. Vol. 3. London: English Historical Society.
- Kemp, B. R. "Salisbury, Roger of". Oxford Dictionary of National Biography (online ed.). Oxford University Press. doi:10.1093/ref:odnb/23956. (Subscription, Wikipedia Library access or UK public library membership required.)
- Laud, William (1694). The history of the troubles and tryal of the Most Reverend Father in God and blessed martyr, William Laud. London: Richard Chiswell. at Early English Books Text Creation Partnership, University of Michigan/Oxford University.
- Lee, Sidney, ed. (1895). "Oliver, George (1782-1867)" . Dictionary of National Biography. Vol. 42. London: Smith, Elder & Co.
- Maxwell Lyte, H. C., ed. (1906). Calendar of the Charter Rolls of the Reign Preserved in the Public Record Office, Henry III–Edward I, 1257–1300. Vol. 2. London: HMSO.
- Maxwell Lyte, H. C., ed. (1922). Close Rolls of the Reign of Henry III Preserved in the Public Record Office, 1247–1251. Vol. 5. London: HMSO.
- Maxwell Lyte, H. C., ed. (1908). Calendar of the Close Rolls, Preserved in the Public Record Office: Edward I, 1302–1307. Vol. 3. London: HMSO.
- Maxwell Lyte, H. C., ed. (1908). Calendar of the Close Rolls, Preserved in the Public Record Office: Henry IV, 1405–1409. Vol. 5. London: HMSO.
- Maxwell Lyte, H. C., ed. (1912). Calendar of the Fine Rolls, Preserved in the Public Record Office: Edward II, 1319–1327. Vol. 3. London: HMSO.
- Maxwell Lyte, H. C., ed. (1916). Calendar of Inquisitions Miscellaneous. Vol. 2. London: HMSO.
- Maxwell Lyte, H. C., ed. (1903). Patent Rolls of the Reign of Henry III Preserved in the Public Record Office, 1225–1232. Vol. 2. London: HMSO.
- Maxwell Lyte, H. C., ed. (1910). Calendar of the Patent Rolls, Preserved in the Public Record Office: Henry III, 1258–1266. Vol. 5. London: HMSO. Archived from the original on 27 April 2016. at University of Iowa.
- Maxwell Lyte, H. C., ed. (1913). Calendar of the Patent Rolls, Preserved in the Public Record Office: Henry III, 1266–1272. Vol. 6. London: HMSO. Archived from the original on 27 April 2016. at University of Iowa.
- Maxwell Lyte, H. C., ed. (1901). Calendar of the Patent Rolls, Preserved in the Public Record Office: Edward I, 1272–1281. Vol. 1. London: HMSO.
- Maxwell Lyte, H. C., ed. (1893). Calendar of the Patent Rolls, Preserved in the Public Record Office: Edward I, 1281–1292. London: HMSO.
- Maxwell Lyte, H. C., ed. (1895). Calendar of the Patent Rolls, Preserved in the Public Record Office: Edward I, 1292–1301. London: HMSO.
- Maxwell Lyte, H. C., ed. (1898). Calendar of the Patent Rolls, Preserved in the Public Record Office: Edward I, 1301–1307. London: HMSO.
- Maxwell Lyte, H. C., ed. (1894). Calendar of the Patent Rolls, Preserved in the Public Record Office: Edward II, 1307–1313. Vol. 1. London: HMSO.
- Maxwell Lyte, H. C., ed. (1904). Calendar of the Patent Rolls, Preserved in the Public Record Office: Edward II, 1321–1324. Vol. 4. London: HMSO. ISBN 9780114401962.
- Maxwell Lyte, H. C., ed. (1891). Calendar of the Patent Rolls, Preserved in the Public Record Office: Edward III, 1327–1330. Vol. 1. London: HMSO.
- Maxwell Lyte, H. C., ed. (1898). Calendar of the Patent Rolls, Preserved in the Public Record Office: Edward III, 1338–1340. Vol. 4. London: HMSO. Archived from the original on 16 August 2016. at University of Iowa.
- Maxwell Lyte, H. C., ed. (1900). Calendar of the Patent Rolls, Preserved in the Public Record Office: Edward III, 1340–1343. Vol. 5. London: HMSO. at University of Iowa.
- Maxwell Lyte, H. C., ed. (1903). Calendar of the Patent Rolls, Preserved in the Public Record Office: Edward III, 1354–1358. Vol. 10. London: HMSO. Archived from the original on 27 April 2016. at University of Iowa.
- Maxwell Lyte, H. C., ed. (1913). Calendar of the Patent Rolls, Preserved in the Public Record Office: Edward III, 1367–1370. Vol. 14. London: HMSO. Archived from the original on 16 August 2016. at University of Iowa.
- Maxwell Lyte, H. C., ed. (1916). Calendar of the Patent Rolls, Preserved in the Public Record Office: Edward III, 1374–1377. Vol. 16. London: HMSO. Archived from the original on 16 August 2016. at University of Iowa.
- Maxwell Lyte, H. C. (ed.). Calendar of the Patent Rolls, Preserved in the Public Record Office: Richard II, 1377–1381. Vol. 1. London: HMSO. Archived from the original on 27 April 2016. at University of Iowa.
- Maxwell Lyte, H. C., ed. (1897). Calendar of the Patent Rolls, Preserved in the Public Record Office: Richard II, 1381–1385. Vol. 2. London: HMSO. Archived from the original on 27 April 2016. at University of Iowa.
- Maxwell Lyte, H. C., ed. (1905). Calendar of the Patent Rolls, Preserved in the Public Record Office: Richard II, 1391–1396. Vol. 5. London: HMSO.
- Maxwell Lyte, H. C., ed. (1909). Calendar of the Patent Rolls, Preserved in the Public Record Office: Richard II, 1396–1399. Vol. 6. London: HMSO. Archived from the original on 17 August 2016. at University of Iowa.
- Maxwell Lyte, H. C., ed. (1906). Calendar of the Patent Rolls, Preserved in the Public Record Office: Henry IV, 1399–1401. Vol. 1. London: HMSO.
- Maxwell Lyte, H. C., ed. (1909). Calendar of the Patent Rolls, Preserved in the Public Record Office: Henry IV, 1408–1413. Vol. 4. London: HMSO. Archived from the original on 27 April 2016. at University of Iowa.
- Maxwell Lyte, H. C., ed. (1907). Calendar of the Patent Rolls, Preserved in the Public Record Office: Henry VI, 1436–1441. Vol. 3. London: HMSO.
- Maxwell Lyte, H. C., ed. (1897). Calendar of the Patent Rolls, Preserved in the Public Record Office: Edward IV, 1461–1467. London: HMSO.
- Maxwell Lyte, H. C., ed. (1901). Calendar of the Patent Rolls, Preserved in the Public Record Office: Edward IV, Edward V, Richard III 1476–1485. London: HMSO.
- Maxwell Lyte, H. C., ed. (1926). Calendar of the Patent Rolls, Preserved in the Public Record Office: Edward VI, 1550–1553. Vol. 4. London: HMSO. at Harold B. Lee Library.
- Maxwell Lyte, H. C., ed. (1926). Calendar of the Patent Rolls, Preserved in the Public Record Office: Edward VI, 1547–1553. Vol. 5. London: HMSO. at Harold B. Lee Library.
- Maxwell Lyte, H. C., ed. (1937). Calendar of the Patent Rolls, Preserved in the Public Record Office: Philip and Mary, 1553–1554. Vol. 1. London: HMSO. at Harold B. Lee Library.
- Mackey, Albert (1912). Hughan, William J.; Hawkins, Edward L. (eds.). An Encyclopedia of Freemasonry and Its Kindred Sciences. Vol. 2 (1921 ed.). Chicago: Masonic History Company.
- Morris, John; Palmer, J. N. N.; Palmer, Matthew; Slater, George; Caroline, Thorn; Thorn, Frank (2011). "Domesday text translation". Hydra Digital Repository. University of Hull.
- Oliver, George (1864). The Book of the Lodge and Officers' Manual (3 ed.). London: Longman.
- Powell-Smith, Anna; Palmer, J. J. N. "Open Domesday".
- Peckham, John (1882). Martin, C. T. (ed.). Registrum Epistolarum Fratris Johannis Peckham, Archiepiscopi Cantuariensis. Vol. 1. London: Longman.
- Peckham, John (1884). Martin, C. T. (ed.). Registrum Epistolarum Fratris Johannis Peckham, Archiepiscopi Cantuariensis. Vol. 2. London: Longman.
- Peel, Albert (1911). Poole, Reginald Lane (ed.). "A Puritan Survey of the Church in Staffordshire in 1604". English Historical Review. 26. Longman: 338–52. doi:10.1093/ehr/XXVI.CII.338.
- Phillimore, Robert (1895). Phillimore, Walter George Frank (ed.). The Ecclesiastical Law of the Church of England. Vol. 1 (2 ed.). London: Sweet and Maxwell; Stevens and Sons.
- Prynne, William (1637). A quench-coale. Or A briefe disquisition and inquirie, in vvhat place of the church or chancell the Lords-table ought to be situated, especially vvhen the Sacrament is administered? Etc. Amsterdam: Richt. at Early English Books Text Creation Partnership, University of Michigan/Oxford University.
- Prynne, William (1644). Canterburies doome, or, The first part of a compleat history of the commitment, charge, tryall, condemnation, execution of William Laud. London: Michael Spark. at Early English Books Text Creation Partnership, University of Michigan/Oxford University.
- Public Record Office, ed. (1963). Calendar of Inquisitions Miscellaneous, 1392–1399. Vol. 6. London: HMSO. ISBN 9780851159263. at HathiTrust.
- Raine, James (1855). Testamenta Eboracensia: a Selection of Wills from the Registry at York. Vol. 2. Durham: Surtees Society.
- Shaw, William A. (1900). A History of the English Church during the Civil Wars and under the Commonwealth, 1640–1660. Vol. 2. London: Longmans, Green.
- Southern, R.W. "Peter of Blois". Oxford Dictionary of National Biography (online ed.). Oxford University Press. doi:10.1093/ref:odnb/22012. (Subscription, Wikipedia Library access or UK public library membership required.)
- Stenton, F. M. (1943). "Anglo-Saxon England". Oxford History of England. Vol. 2 (1947 ed.). Oxford: Oxford University. ASIN B0007ISNF4.
- Wesley, John. The Journal of the Rev. John Wesley. Vol. 3 (1906 ed.). London: Dent.
- Wharton, Henry, ed. (1691). Anglia Sacra. Vol. 1. London: Richard Chiswel.
- William Salt Archaeological Society, ed. (1913). Collections for a History of Staffordshire. Vol. 1913. London: Harrison.
- "Wolverhampton History and Heritage Website". Bev Parker.
- William Salt Archaeological Society, ed. (1883). Collections for a History of Staffordshire. Vol. 4. London: Harrison.
- Wrottesley, George; William Salt Archaeological Society, eds. (1882). "Staffordshire Suits extracted from the Plea Rolls temp. Richard I and King John". Collections for a History of Staffordshire. 3. London: Harrison: 1–163.
- William Salt Archaeological Society, ed. (1885). Collections for a History of Staffordshire. Vol. 6, Part 1. London: Harrison.
- William Salt Archaeological Society, ed. (1891). Collections for a History of Staffordshire. Vol. 12. London: Harrison.
- William Salt Archaeological Society, ed. (1894). Collections for a History of Staffordshire. Vol. 15. London: Harrison.
- William Salt Archaeological Society, ed. (1900). Collections for a History of Staffordshire. 2. Vol. 3. London: Harrison.
- William Salt Archaeological Society, ed. (1911). Collections for a History of Staffordshire. Vol. 1911 Yearbook. London: Harrison.
- William Salt Archaeological Society, ed. (1915). Collections for a History of Staffordshire. Vol. 1915 Yearbook. London: Harrison.
- John William Willis-Bund (1913). "Parishes: Dudley". A History of the County of Worcester: Volume 3. Institute of Historical Research.
