= Earl of Buckinghamshire =

Earldom in the Peerage of Great Britain

Earldom of Buckinghamshire
- Quarterly 1 and 4: Argent, a saltire gules between four eagles displayed azure (Hampden); 2 and 3: Sable, an estoile of six points or between two flaunches ermine (Hobart)
- Creation date: 5 September 1746; 280 years ago
- Created by: George II
- Peerage: Peerage of Great Britain
- First holder: John Hobart, 1st Earl of Buckinghamshire
- Present holder: George Hobart-Hampden, 10th Earl of Buckinghamshire
- Heir presumptive: Sir John Vere Hobart, 4th Baronet of Langdown
- Remainder to: the 1st Earl's heirs male whatsoever
- Subsidiary titles: Baron Hobart of Blickling
- Status: Extant
- Former seats: Blickling Hall; Hampden House
- Motto: AUCTOR PRETIOSA FACIT (It is the giver who makes things valuable); VESTIGIA NULLA RETRORSUM (No steps backwards)

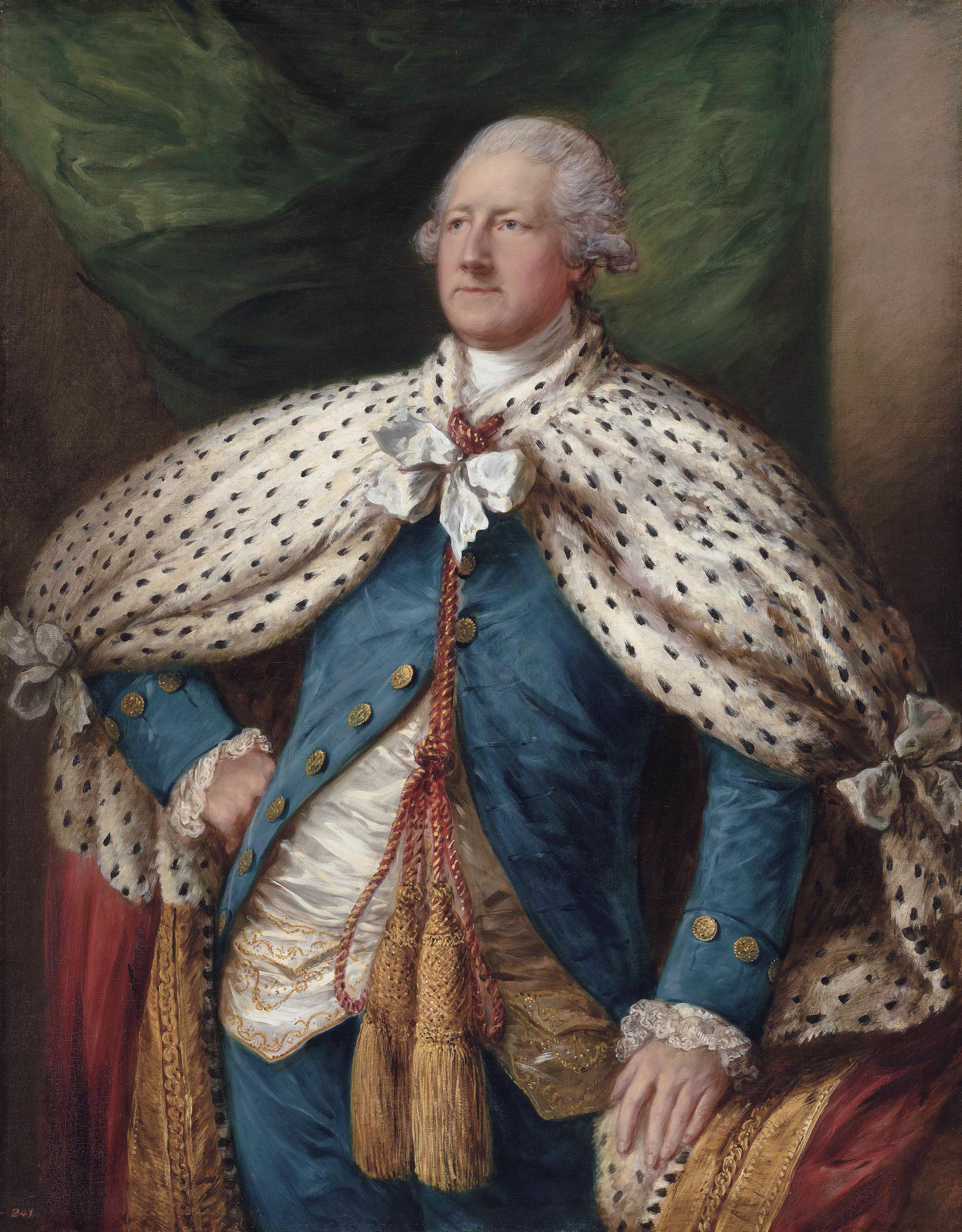
John Hobart, 2nd Earl of Buckinghamshire

Earl of Buckinghamshire is a title in the Peerage of Great Britain. It was created in 1746 for John Hobart, 1st Baron Hobart.

== History ==
The Hobart family descends from Henry Hobart, who served as Attorney General and Lord Chief Justice of the Common Pleas. In 1611 he was created a Baronet, of Intwood in the County of Norfolk, in the Baronetage of England. He was succeeded by his son, the second Baronet. He represented Cambridge, Lostwithiel, Brackley and Norfolk in the House of Commons. He died without surviving male issue and was succeeded by his nephew, the third Baronet. He was the son of Sir Miles Hobart, younger son of the first Baronet. Hobart sat as Member of Parliament for Norfolk. In 1656 he married Mary, daughter of the prominent politician John Hampden.

He was succeeded by his elder son, the fourth Baronet. He was a General of the Horse and was equerry to King William III at the Battle of the Boyne in 1690. He also represented Norfolk, King's Lynn and Bere Alston in Parliament. Hobart was killed in a duel in 1698. His son, the fifth Baronet, served as Treasurer of the Chamber, as Captain of the Honourable Band of Gentlemen Pensioners and as Lord Lieutenant of Norfolk. In 1728 he was raised to the Peerage of Great Britain as Baron Hobart, of Blickling in the County of Norfolk, and in 1746 he was further honoured when he was made Earl of Buckinghamshire, also in the Peerage of Great Britain.

On his death, the titles passed to his son from his first marriage, the second Earl. He served as Comptroller of the Household, as Ambassador to Russia and as Lord Lieutenant of Ireland. He died without surviving male issue and was succeeded by his half-brother, the third Earl. He represented St Ives and Bere Alston in the House of Commons. His eldest son, the fourth Earl, was a prominent politician. He served as Governor of Madras, as Secretary of State for War and the Colonies, as Chancellor of the Duchy of Lancaster, as Joint Postmaster General and as President of the Board of Control. In 1797 he was summoned to the House of Lords through a writ of acceleration in his father's junior title of Baron Hobart. The town of Hobart, Tasmania, was named in honour of Lord Buckinghamshire.

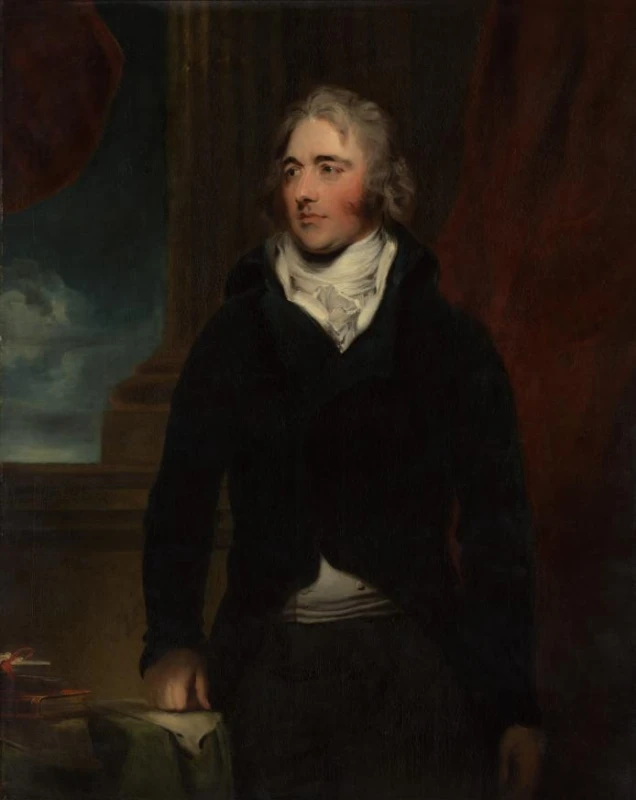
Robert Hobart, 4th Earl of Buckinghamshire

He died without male issue and was succeeded by his nephew, the fifth Earl. He was the son of the Hon. George Vere Hobart, second son of the third Earl. Lord Buckinghamshire briefly represented St Michael's in Parliament. In 1824 he assumed by Royal licence the additional surname of Hampden. He died childless and was succeeded by his younger brother, the sixth Earl. He was a clergyman. In 1878 he assumed by Royal licence the additional surname of Hampden. He was succeeded by his grandson, the seventh Earl. He was the second but only surviving son of Frederick John Hobart-Hampden, Lord Hobart, second son of the sixth Earl. Lord Buckinghamshire served briefly as a Lord-in-waiting (government whip in the House of Lords) in 1895 in the Liberal administration of the Earl of Rosebery. He married Georgiana Wilhelmina Haldane-Duncan-Mercer-Henderson, daughter of the Hon. Hew Adam Dalrymple Hamilton Haldane-Duncan-Mercer-Henderson and Edith Isabella Mercer-Henderson. In 1903 Lord Buckinghamshire assumed by Royal licence the additional surnames of Mercer-Henderson.

On his death, the titles passed to his only son, the eighth Earl. He was Deputy Chairman of Committees in the House of Lords and a Deputy Speaker of the House of Lords. In 1938 he assumed by Royal licence the surname of Mercer-Henderson only in lieu of Hobart-Hampden-Mercer-Henderson. He never married and on his death in 1963 the line of the second son of the sixth Earl failed. He was succeeded by his second cousin, the ninth Earl. He was the grandson of the Hon. Charles Edward Hobart-Hampden, fourth son of the sixth Earl. He was childless and was succeeded by his second cousin once removed, the tenth Earl and (As of 2010) present holder of the titles. He is the great-grandson of the Hon. George Augustus Hobart-Hampden, fifth son of the sixth Earl (and the eldest from his second marriage).

Several other members of the Hobart family have also gained distinction. The Hon. Henry Hobart, younger son of the first Earl from his second marriage, represented Norwich in Parliament and served as Chairman of Ways and Means. Vere Henry Hobart, Lord Hobart, eldest son of the sixth Earl, was Governor of Madras. The Hon. Augustus Charles Hobart-Hampden, third son of the sixth Earl, was a vice-admiral in the Royal Navy. Also, Henrietta Hobart, daughter of the fourth Baronet and sister of the first Earl, was a longtime mistress of King George II.

The family seat was Hampden House, near Great Hampden, Buckinghamshire.

== Hobart Baronets, of Intwood (1611) ==
- Sir Henry Hobart, 1st Baronet (died 1625)
- Sir John Hobart, 2nd Baronet (1593–1647)
- Sir John Hobart, 3rd Baronet (1628–1683)
- Sir Henry Hobart, 4th Baronet (1657–1698)
- Sir John Hobart, 5th Baronet (1695–1756) (created Baron Hobart in 1728 and Earl of Buckinghamshire in 1746)

== Earls of Buckinghamshire (1746) ==
- John Hobart, 1st Earl of Buckinghamshire (1695–1756)
- John Hobart, 2nd Earl of Buckinghamshire (1723–1793)
  - John Hobart, Lord Hobart (1773–1775)
  - Henry Philip Hobart, Lord Hobart (1775–1776)
  - George Hobart, Lord Hobart (1777–1778)
- George Hobart, 3rd Earl of Buckinghamshire (1731–1804)
- Robert Hobart, 4th Earl of Buckinghamshire (1760–1816)
- George Robert Hobart-Hampden, 5th Earl of Buckinghamshire (1789–1849)
- Augustus Edward Hobart-Hampden, 6th Earl of Buckinghamshire (1793–1885)
  - Vere Henry Hobart, Lord Hobart (1818–1875)
  - Frederick John Hobart-Hampden, Lord Hobart (1821–1875)
    - Henry Frederick Edward John Hobart-Hampden (1857–1871)
- Sidney Carr Hobart-Hampden-Mercer-Henderson, 7th Earl of Buckinghamshire (1860–1930)
- John Hampden Mercer-Henderson, 8th Earl of Buckinghamshire (1906–1963)
- Vere Frederick Cecil Hobart-Hampden, 9th Earl of Buckinghamshire (1901–1983)
- George Miles Hobart-Hampden, 10th Earl of Buckinghamshire (b. 1944)

The heir presumptive is the present holder's fourth cousin once removed Sir John Vere Hobart, 4th Baronet of Langdown (b. 1945) (see below line of succession)
The heir presumptive's heir apparent is his son George Hampden Hobart (b. 1982)

Line of succession (simplified)
- John Hobart, 1st Earl of Buckinghamshire (1695–1756)
  - George Hobart, 3rd Earl of Buckinghamshire (1731–1804)
    - Hon. George Vere Hobart (1761–1802)
      - Augustus Hobart-Hampden, 6th Earl of Buckinghamshire (1793–1885)
        - Hon. George Augustus Hobart-Hampden (1827–1899)
          - Ernest Miles Hobart-Hampden (1864–1949)
            - Cyril Langel Hobart-Hampden (1902–1972)
              - George Hobart-Hampden, 10th Earl of Buckinghamshire (born 1944)
    - Very Rev. Hon. Henry Lewis Hobart (1774–1846)
      - Sir Robert Henry Hobart, 1st Baronet (1836–1928)
        - Sir Claud Vere Cavendish Hobart, 2nd Baronet (1870–1949)
          - Sir Robert Hampden Hobart, 3rd Baronet (1915–1988)
            - (1) Sir John Vere Hobart, 4th Baronet of Langdown (born 1945)
              - (2) George Hampden Hobart (born 1982)
              - (3) James Henry Miles Hobart (born 1986)
            - (4) Robert Henry Hobart (born 1948)
            - (5) Anthony Hampden Hobart (born 1956)
              - (6) Charles Hampden Hobart (born 1986)
              - (7) Frederick Alexander Hobart (born 1990)
  - Hon. Henry Hobart (1738–1799)
    - Rev. Henry Charles Hobart (1773–1844)
      - Charles Robert Hobart (1808–1886)
        - Charles Beauchamp Hobart (1842–1893)
          - Charles Guy Reginald Beauchamp Hobart (1881–1944)
            - Wallace Elliot Hobart (1922–1972)
              - male issue in line
        - Rev. William Henry Hobart (1855–1918)
          - Rev. Charles Hampden Hobart (1886–1961)
            - John Hampden Hobart (1925–2014)
              - male issue in line
            - Christopher Beauchamp Hobart (1927–2017)
              - male issue in line

== See also ==
- Hobart Baronets of Langdown
- Earl of Buckinghamshire (1814 ship)
