= George Vere Hobart =

British politician (1761-1802)

The Honourable George Vere Hobart (1761 – 5 November 1802) was a British politician who served as Lieutenant Governor of Grenada, West Indies. He was the father of the 5th Earl of Buckinghamshire.

Hobart was a younger son of George Hobart, 3rd Earl of Buckinghamshire and his wife Albinia Bertie, the daughter of Lord Vere Bertie, who was, in turn, a son of the 1st Duke of Ancaster and Kesteven. His elder brother was the Tory politician Robert Hobart, 4th Earl of Buckinghamshire. His younger brother was the Anglican priest the Hon. Henry Hobart.

Hobart served as a Lieutenant Governor of Canada. He was appointed Lieutenant Governor of Grenada in 1802, being subordinate to Lord Seaforth, Governor of Barbados. His term as the first Lieutenant Governor of Grenada was to be less than a year as he died on 5 November 1802, aged 41, after contracting yellow fever. Coun Douly Rankin was responsible for escorting back his widow Janet and daughter Vere, the latter being posthumously-born on the return voyage.

== Family ==
Hobart married firstly Jane Cataneo, the daughter of Horace Cataneo, Esq. of Leeds, Yorkshire. They had four children:

- George Robert Hobart, 5th Earl of Buckinghamshire (1789–1849), who succeeded to the earldom upon the death of his uncle in 1816, but died without issue
- Augustus Edward Hobart, 6th Earl of Buckinghamshire (1793–1885), succeeded his brother in 1849; from whom the current Earls of Buckinghamshire descend
- Lady Albinia Jane Hobart (2 May 1788 – 28 May 1867), married Sir Augustus Foster, 1st Baronet
- Lady Harriet Hobart (8 August 1795 – 27 December 1868) married 1820 Jasper Scityon Hagerman of Denmark

He married secondly Janet Maclean, the daughter of Colonel Alexander Roy Maclean, 15th of Coll and Catherine Cameron, the daughter of Allan Cameron, 5th of Glendessary. They had one daughter:

- Lady Vere Catherine Louisa Hobart (1803–1888), born posthumously; married Capt. Donald Cameron, 23rd of Lochiel, Chief of Clan Cameron

In 1832, his children were raised to the rank of the children of an earl, as he would have succeeded to the title if he had outlived his brother.

== See also ==
- Earl of Buckinghamshire
- List of Governors of Grenada

== Bibliography ==
- Mosley, Charles (1999). "Buckinghamshire". Burke's Genealogical and Heraldic History of the Peerage, Baronetage and Knightage. Vol. 1 (106th ed.).

Government offices
Preceded by Office established	Lieutenant Governor of Grenada; 1802–5 November 1802	Succeeded by Thomas Hislop
