= George Hobart-Hampden =

George Hobart-Hampden may refer to:

- George Hobart-Hampden, 10th Earl of Buckinghamshire (born 1944), British peer and businessman
- George Hobart-Hampden, 5th Earl of Buckinghamshire (1789–1849), British peer and politician
