= Robert Hobart, 4th Earl of Buckinghamshire =

British politician (1760–1816)

The Right Honourable The Earl of Buckinghamshire PC
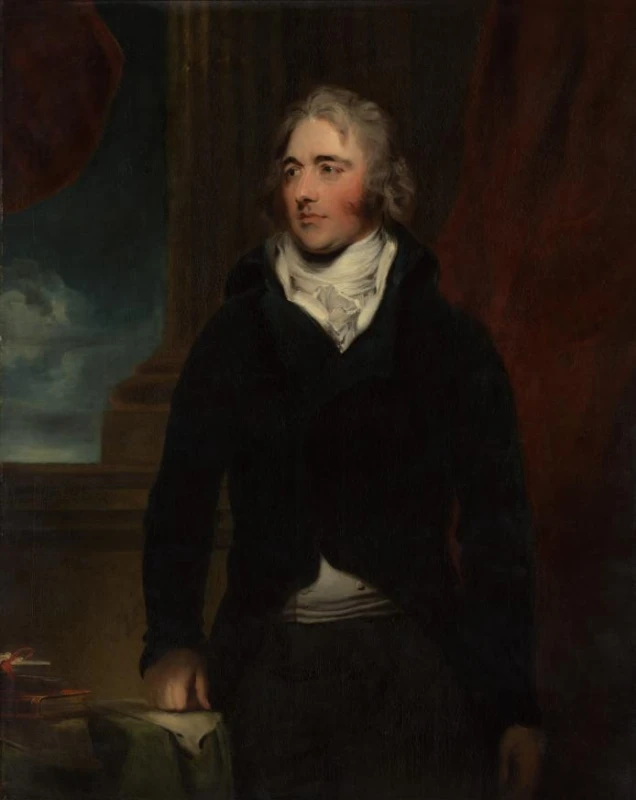
- Portrait by Thomas Lawrence, c. 1794

Secretary of State for War and the Colonies
- In office 17 March 1801 – 12 May 1804
- Monarch: George III
- Prime Minister: Henry Addington
- Preceded by: New office
- Succeeded by: The Earl Camden

Chancellor of the Duchy of Lancaster
- In office 23 June – 23 August 1812
- Monarch: George III
- Prime Minister: The Earl of Liverpool
- Preceded by: Spencer Perceval
- Succeeded by: Charles Bathurst

Personal details
- Born: 6 May 1760 Hampden House, Great Hampden
- Died: 4 February 1816 (aged 55) Hamilton Place, London
- Party: Tory
- Spouse(s): (1) Margaretta Bourke (died 1796) (2) Hon. Eleanor Eden (1777–1851)
- Children: Sarah Robinson, Countess of Ripon
- Education: None

Robert Hobart, 4th Earl of Buckinghamshire, PC (6 May 1760 – 4 February 1816), styled Lord Hobart from 1798 to 1804, was a British Tory politician who served as Secretary of State for War and the Colonies from 1801 to 1804.

== Life ==
Buckinghamshire was born at Hampden House, the son of George Hobart, 3rd Earl of Buckinghamshire and Albinia, daughter of Lord Vere Bertie, younger son of Robert Bertie, 1st Duke of Ancaster and Kesteven. He was educated at Westminster School, London and later served in the American Revolutionary War.

=== Political career ===
Buckinghamshire was a Member of Parliament (MP) in the Irish House of Commons for Portarlington from 1784 to 1790 and thereafter for Armagh Borough from 1790 to 1797. He sat also in the British House of Commons for the rotten borough of Bramber in 1788, a seat he held until 1790, and then for Lincoln from 1790 to 1796. He acted as aide-de-camp to successive Lord Lieutenants of Ireland from 1784 onwards, and from 1789 to 1793 he was chief secretary to the Lord Lieutenant, exerting his influence in this country to prevent any concessions to Roman Catholics.

In 1793 he was invested a member of the Privy Council, and appointed Governor of Madras. In 1798 he was recalled to England by the President of the Board of Control responsible for Indian affairs, Henry Dundas and summoned to the House of Lords through a writ of acceleration in his father's junior title of Baron Hobart. In the Lords, he favoured the union between England and Ireland. He was the leader of the House of Lords from March to October 1801. He later served as Secretary of State for War and the Colonies from 1801 to 1804 when it was said he had "a better grasp of the local or colonial conditions, and a more active spirit than did some of his successors." He was Chancellor of the Duchy of Lancaster in 1805 and again in 1812, Postmaster General from 1806 to 1807 and President of the Board of Control, a post for which his time in India suited him, from 1812 to 1816. Hobart, the capital of Tasmania, is named after Lord Buckinghamshire.

=== Family ===
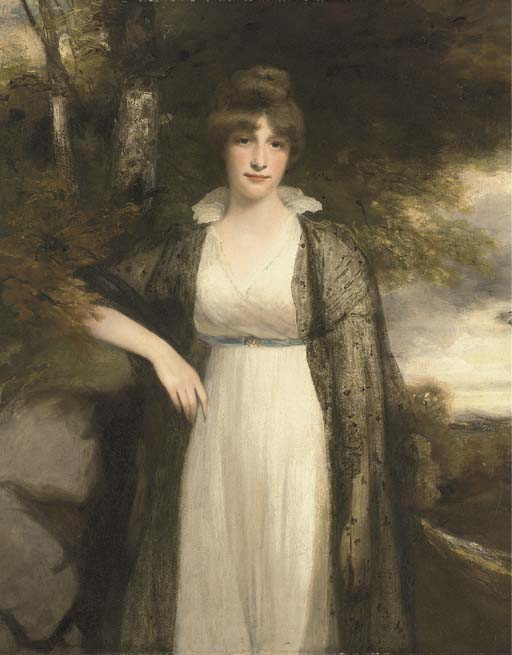
Eleanor Agnes, Countess of Buckinghamshire, by John Hoppner

Lord Buckinghamshire married firstly in 1792 Margaretta (Margaret) Adderley (1766–1796), widow of Thomas Adderley (1712–91) and daughter of Edmund Bourke (Burke). She had three sons and a daughter with Adderley, more than 50 years her senior, whom she married at age 13.

He had two illegitimate children with Margaretta Adderley before they married:

- Charles John Robert Ellis (1786–1835), married Myra Ann Kinchant, daughter of Richard Kinchant
- Sir Henry Ellis (1788–1855)

They married in 1792.

- Lady Sarah (1793–1867), who married Prime Minister Lord Goderich and was the mother of George Robinson, 1st Marquess of Ripon
- John Hobart (born 29 November 1795 in Madras), who died in infancy

After Margaretta's death in 1796 in Madras, he married secondly the Hon. Eleanor Eden, daughter of William Eden, 1st Baron Auckland, in 1799. Two years earlier William Pitt the Younger had broken off what was generally believed to be an informal engagement to Eleanor. There were no children from this marriage. Lord Buckinghamshire died in February 1816 at the age of 55, after a fall from his horse. He was succeeded in the earldom by his nephew, George. Lady Buckinghamshire died in October 1851, aged 74.

Parliament of Ireland
Preceded by John Scott; Thomas Kelly	Member of Parliament for Portarlington; 1784–1790; With: Sir Boyle Roche, 1st Bt	Succeeded by Richard Cavendish; William Browne
Preceded by George Rawson; Henry Duquery	Member of Parliament for Armagh Borough; 1790–1797; With: George Rawson 1790–1796; Sackville Hamilton 1796–1797	Succeeded by Sackville Hamilton; Hon. Thomas Pelham
Parliament of Great Britain
Preceded by Sir Henry Gough-Calthorpe, Bt; Daniel Pulteney	Member of Parliament for Bramber; 1788–1790; With: Sir Henry Gough-Calthorpe, Bt	Succeeded by Sir Henry Gough-Calthorpe, Bt; Thomas Coxhead
Preceded by John Fenton-Cawthorne; Richard Lumley-Saunderson	Member of Parliament for Lincoln; 1790–1796; With: John Fenton-Cawthorne 1790–1796; George Rawdon 1796	Succeeded by George Rawdon; Richard Ellison
Political offices
Preceded by Alleyne FitzHerbert	Chief Secretary for Ireland; 1789–1793	Succeeded by Sylvester Douglas
Preceded by The Lord Grenville	Leader of the House of Lords; February–October 1801	Succeeded by The Lord Pelham
Preceded by Henry Dundas as Secretary of State for War	Secretary of State for War and the Colonies; 1801–1804	Succeeded by The Earl Camden
Preceded by The Lord Mulgrave	Chancellor of the Duchy of Lancaster; 1805	Succeeded by The Lord Harrowby
Preceded by Spencer Perceval	Chancellor of the Duchy of Lancaster; 1812	Succeeded by Charles Bathurst
Preceded by The Viscount Melville	President of the Board of Control; 1812–1816	Succeeded by George Canning
Peerage of Great Britain
Preceded by George Hobart	Earl of Buckinghamshire; 1804–1816	Succeeded by George Hobart-Hampden
Preceded by George Hobart	Baron Hobart (writ of acceleration); 1798–1816	Succeeded by George Hobart-Hampden
