= List of shipwrecks in October 1822 =

The list of shipwrecks in October 1822 includes some ships sunk, foundered, grounded, or otherwise lost during October 1822.

== 2 October ==
List of shipwrecks: 2 October 1822
Ship	State	Description
Conceição	Portugal	The yacht sank in the Mondego River at Figueira da Foz.
Hope	United Kingdom	The ship was driven ashore on the Isle of Skye. She was on a voyage from Christiansand, Norway to Coleraine, County Antrim.
London Packet	United Kingdom	The ship was driven ashore and wrecked at Cullentown, County Wexford. Her crew were rescued. She was on a voyage from Newfoundland to Liverpool, Lancashire.

== 4 October ==
List of shipwrecks: 4 October 1822
Ship	State	Description
Thomas Tyson	United Kingdom	The ship was dismasted and driven ashore on the Isle of Skye. She was on a voyage from St. Petersburg, Russia to Liverpool, Lancashire.

== 6 October ==
List of shipwrecks: 6 October 1822
Ship	State	Description
Ann	United Kingdom	The ship was wrecked at Donaghadee, County Down. She was on a voyage from Quebec City, Lower Canada, British North America to Dublin.
Britannia	United Kingdom	The ship was wrecked near Killala, County Mayo.
Earl of Buckinghamshire	United Kingdom	The ship was wrecked in the Atlantic Ocean with the loss of two of the 46 people on board. The survivors were rescued on 14 October by Mary (United Kingdom). Earl of Buckinghamshire was on a voyage from Quebec City, Lower Canada, British North America to Greenock, Renfrewshire. She came ashore in Galway Bay on 5 November and was wrecked.
Favourite	United Kingdom	The ship departed from Belfast, County Antrim for Liverpool, Lancashire. No further trace, presumed foundered in the Irish Sea with the loss of all hands.
George	United Kingdom	The ship was wrecked in the Atlantic Ocean with the ultimate loss of ten of the twelve people on board. The survivors were rescued on 14 November by Saltom (United Kingdom. George was on a voyage from Quebec to Greenock. She came ashore in Clew Bay, County Mayo in mid-December.
Industry	United Kingdom	The ship was driven ashore and severely damaged at Peel, Isle of Man. She was on a voyage from Bangor to Ballyshannon, County Donegal
Mary and Henry	United States	The brig was driven ashore and wrecked at Almorness, Kirkcudbrightshire, United Kingdom. Her crew survived. She was on a voyage from Charleston, South Carolina to Liverpool, Lancashire, United Kingdom.
Marthas	United Kingdom	The sloop sprang a leak in the North Sea and was set afire when her cargo of quicklime reacted with the seawater. She was beached the next day at Stonehaven, Aberdeenshire where she was totally destroyed. Her crew were rescued. Marthas was on a voyage from Sunderland, County Durham to Findhorn, Morayshire.
Mercury	United Kingdom	The ship was lost in the Formby Channel. She was on a voyage from Campbeltown, Argyllshire to Liverpool.
Timandra	United Kingdom	The ship sprang a leak and foundered in the Arctic Sea 80 nautical miles (150 km) off Lofoten, Norway. Her crew survived. She was on a voyage from Arkhangelsk, Russia to London.
Twe Gebruder	Prussia	The ship was wrecked on Skagen, Denmark. Her crew were rescued. She was on a voyage from Stettin, to Bordeaux, Gironde, France.

== 7 October ==
List of shipwrecks: 7 October 1822
Ship	State	Description
Annette	Danzig	The full-rigged ship was driven ashore near Campbeltown, Argyllshire, United Kingdom. She was on a voyage from Danzig to Liverpool, Lancashire, United Kingdom. Annette was refloated with assistance from HMS Fly and HMS Gannet (both Royal Navy).
Britannia	United Kingdom	The brig capsized off Milford Haven, Pembrokeshire with the loss of all hands. She was on a voyage from Youghal, County Cork to Bristol, Gloucestershire.
Galatea	United Kingdom	The ship ran aground on the Foreness Rock, off Margate, Kent. She was on a voyage from Quebec City, Lower Canada, British North America to London.
George	United Kingdom	The ship was driven ashore at Great Yarmouth, Norfolk. She was on a voyage from London to Sunderland, County Durham.
Good Intent	United Kingdom	The ship was wrecked in Costello Bay. She was on a voyage from Galway to Bristol, Gloucestershire.
Jane	United Kingdom	The sloop foundered in the North Sea off Rattray Head, Aberdeenshire. Her crew were rescued. She was on a voyage from Leith, Lothian to Fraserburgh, Aberdeenshire.
Jane	United Kingdom	The ship was driven ashore on Islay. She was on a voyage from Liverpool, Lancashire to Newfoundland, British North America. Jane was refloated on 17 October and taken in to Greenock, Renfrewshire.
John	United Kingdom	The ship ran aground at Rossglass, County Antrim. She was on a voyage from Dundalk, County Louth to Belfast, County Antrim
Lively	United Kingdom	The ship was driven ashore at Ardrossan, Ayrshire. She was on a voyage from Dublin to Ardrossan.
Martha	United Kingdom	The sloop caught fire and was destroyed at Stonehaven, Aberdeenshire. Her crew were rescued. She was on a voyage from Sunderland to Findhorn, Morayshire.
Merchant	United Kingdom	The ship foundered in Douglas Bay. Her crew were rescued. She was on a voyage from Dundalk, County Louth to Liverpool.
Mercury	United Kingdom	The ship foundered in the Formby Channel. She was on a voyage from Campbeltown to Liverpool.
Redder Derre	Unknown	The ship was driven ashore at Porthleven, Cornwall, United Kingdom.
Tryokh Svyatiteley (Трёх Святителей, 'Three Hierarchs')	Imperial Russian Navy	The brigantine sprang a leak and was beached near Cape Balaban, east of Burnas Lagoon. Her crew survived. She was on a voyage from the Danube to Nikolayev. Tryokh Svyatiteley was subsequently dismantled.

== 8 October ==
List of shipwrecks: 8 October 1822
Ship	State	Description
Martin	United Kingdom	The ship foundered in the North Sea off Cleethorpes, Lincolnshire with the loss of all hands.
Mary & Henry	United Kingdom	The ship was driven ashore and wrecked near Kirkcudbright, Wigtownshire. She was on a voyage from Charleston, South Carolina, United States to Liverpool, Lancashire.
Mercury	United Kingdom	The ship foundered in the Formby Channel. She was on a voyage from Campbeltown, Argyllshire to Liverpool.
Sarah & Marianne	United Kingdom	The ship was driven ashore and severely damaged anear Maryport, Cumberland. She was refloated the next day.
Soker	United Kingdom	The ship capsized in the North Sea off Clea Ness, Lincolnshire with the loss of all hands. She was on a voyage from Hull, Yorkshire to Sunderland, County Durham.
Sylvia	United Kingdom	The ship was wrecked on the south coast of Götaland, Sweden Her crew were rescued. She was on a voyage from Saint Petersburgh, Russia to London.

== 9 October ==
List of shipwrecks: 9 October 1822
Ship	State	Description
David	United Kingdom	The ship was wrecked in the Atlantic Ocean with the loss of seven of her seventeen crew. Survivors were rescued by Woodblue (United Kingdom). David was on a voyage from Saint John, New Brunswick, British North America to Glasgow, Renfrewshire. She was taken in to Roundstone Bay in a wrecked condition on 10 November.
Haabet	Norway	The ship was wrecked near Bergen. Her crew were rescued. She was on a voyage from Newcastle upon Tyne, Northumberland, United Kingdom to Bergen.
Hibernia	United Kingdom	The ship was wrecked in the Atlantic Ocean. Her crew were rescued by a French ship. She was on a voyage from St. Andrews, New Brunswick, British North America to Belfast, County Antrim.

== 10 October ==
List of shipwrecks: 10 October 1822
Ship	State	Description
Coaster	(United Kingdom of Great Britain and Ireland) British North America	The schooner was driven ashore and wrecked at "Boneake", Newfoundland. Her crew were rescued.
Flora	United Kingdom	The ship was abandoned whilst on a voyage from Riga, Russia to Dundee, Forfarshire. Her crew were rescued by St. Martin's Planter (United Kingdom).
Mary-Ann	(United Kingdom of Great Britain and Ireland) British North America	The ship was wrecked at St. John's, Newfoundland with the loss of a crew member.

== 11 October ==
List of shipwrecks: 11 October 1822
Ship	State	Description
Appelona	United Kingdom	The ship was struck by lightning and sank in the Atlantic Ocean 18 nautical miles (33 km) off Oswego, New York. Her five crew survived.
Ariadne	United Kingdom	The ship ran aground on the Insand, in the North Sea off South Shields, County Durham and was severely damaged. She was on a voyage from South Shields to London.
Christopher	United Kingdom	The ship was driven ashore and wrecked at "Widewell". Her crew were rescued.
Darthula	(United Kingdom of Great Britain and Ireland) British North America	The ship was wrecked near Crookhaven, County Cork, United Kingdom. Her crew were rescued. She was on a voyage from Liverpool, Lancashire, United Kingdom to Saint John, New Brunswick.
Friendship	United Kingdom	The ship was driven ashore and wrecked near Thurso, Caithness with the loss of all eight crew.
Janet and Mary	United Kingdom	The ship was driven ashore and wrecked at Widewall, Orkney Islands. Her three crew were rescued by Aspasia (United Kingdom).

== 12 October ==
List of shipwrecks: 12 October 1822
Ship	State	Description
Bainbridge	United Kingdom	The ship was driven ashore and severely damaged at Beaumaris, Anglesey. She was on a voyage from New Orleans, Louisiana, United States to Liverpool, Lancashire. Bainbridge was refloated on 14 October and departed under tow on 16 October for Liverpool.
Dispatch	United Kingdom	The ship struck the Herring Rock in the River Shannon and sank. She was on a voyage from Limerick to Kingston upon Hull, Yorkshire.
Gemini	United Kingdom	The ship was driven ashore and wrecked on Clare Island, County Mayo. She was on a voyage from Miramichi Bay to Maryport, Cumberland.
Governor Griswold	United States	The ship sprang a leak and was abandoned in the Atlantic Ocean. Her crew were rescued. She was on a voyage from Rotterdam, South Holland, Netherlands to New York.
Isabella	United Kingdom	The smack capsized in a squall off Great Cumbrae, Bute. Both crew were rescued by Johns Packet (United Kingdom). She was on a voyage from Saltcoats, Ayrshire to Rothesay, Bute.
Isabella	United Kingdom	The ship was driven ashore in Blacksod Bay.
Minerva	United Kingdom	The ship was driven ashore at "Redcairn".
Plinius	Norway	The ship was lost near Egersund. She was on a voyage from Narva, Russia to Stavanger.
Slaney	United Kingdom	The brig was driven ashore and wrecked at Burnfoot, Ayrshire. Her crew survived. She was on a voyage from Ayr to Dublin.
Trebley	United Kingdom	The ship was drinen ashore at "Redcairn".
William	United Kingdom	The ship capsized at Limerick.

== 13 October ==
List of shipwrecks: 13 October 1822
Ship	State	Description
Amphitrite	United Kingdom	The ship ran aground on the Herd Sand, in the North Sea off North Shields, County Durham and was severely damaged.
Ann	United Kingdom	The ship was driven ashore at Redcar, Yorkshire.
Anna	United Kingdom	The ship was driven ashore at Sunderland, County Durham.
Barbara	United Kingdom	The ship was driven ashore at Redcar.
Betsey and Mary	United Kingdom	The brig was driven ashore and wrecked at Ingoldmells, Lincolnshire. Her crew were rescued. She was on a voyage from King's Lynn, Norfolk to Hull, Yorkshire.
Blagdon	United Kingdom	The brig ran aground on the Herd Sand and was severely damaged.
Dolphin	United Kingdom	The ship was lost near Great Yarmouth with the loss of all but one of her crew.
Eliza and Margaret	United Kingdom	The ship was driven ashore at Redcar, Yorkshire. Her crew were rescued. She was on a voyage from London to Sunderland.
Elizabeth and Hannah	United Kingdom	The ship was driven ashore at Weybourne, Norfolk. She was refloated on 29 October and taken in to Great Yarmouth.
Emma	United Kingdom	The ship ran aground on the Lemon Sand, in the North Sea and was damaged. She was on a voyage from Sunderland to Havre de Grâce, Seine-Inférieure, France. Emma was later refloated and taken in to Harwich, Essex.
Endeavour	United Kingdom	The ship was driven ashore at Dublin. Her crew survived; they rescued the crew of the Dublin Lifeboat, which had gone to her rescue but capsized. Endeavour was on a voyage from St. Andrew, New Brunswick to Dublin.
Friends Goodwill	United Kingdom	The ship was driven ashore between Blakeney and Wells-next-the-Sea.
Good Intent	United Kingdom	The ship was lost near Cromer, Norfolk. Her crew were rescued.
Good Intent	United Kingdom	The sloop was driven ashore near Margate, Kent. She was on a voyage from London to Cowes, Isle of Wight. Good Intent was refloated on 16 October.
Happy Return	United Kingdom	The ship was driven ashore and wrecked south of Filey, Yorkshire. Her crew were rescued. She was on a voyage from Whitby, Yorkshire to Hull.
Hope	United Kingdom	The ship foundered in the North Sea off Winterton-on-Sea.
Jemima	United Kingdom	The ship was driven ashore and wrecked at Hastings, Sussex. She was on a voyage from Hastings to London.
John and Martha	United Kingdom	The ship foundered in the North Sea off Ingoldmells, Lincolnshire with the loss of all on board.
London	(United Kingdom of Great Britain and Ireland) British North America	The ship was lost near Bangor, County Down, United Kingdom. She was on a voyage from Quebec City, Lower Canada to London, United Kingdom.
Mary	United Kingdom	The ship was driven ashore and wrecked at Hastings. She was on a voyage from Hastings to London.
Nelson	United Kingdom	The brig was driven ashore near Wells-next-the-Sea, Norfolk.
Osbaldeston	United Kingdom	The ship was driven onto the East Hoyle Bank and sank. She was on a voyage from Liverpool, Lancashire to British Honduras. Osbaldeston was refloated on 30 October and taken in to Liverpool.
Ovington	United Kingdom	The ship was driven ashore at Redcar. She was on a voyage from London to Newcastle upon Tyne.
Prosperous	United Kingdom	The ship was driven ashore and wrecked at Hastings. She was on a voyage from Hastings to London.
Rose	United Kingdom	The ship was driven ashore at Dromore, County Down. She was on a voyage from Strangford Lough to Liverpool.
Ruby	United Kingdom	The ship was driven ashore and wrecked at Gristhorpe, Yorkshire. Her crew were rescued. She was on a voyage from Whitby to London.
Sarah and Mary	United Kingdom	The ship was driven ashore at Lowestoft, Suffolk. Her crew were rescued. She was on a voyage from Boston, Lincolnshire to London.
Sophia	United Kingdom	The ship foundered in The Wash off Boston, Lincolnshire with the loss of all hands. She was on a voyage from Sunderland to Southwold, Suffolk.
Smilax	United Kingdom	The ship was driven ashore and wrecked near Mundesley, Norfolk. Her crew were rescued. She was on a voyage from Poole, Dorset to Hull.
Supply	United Kingdom	The ship was lost near Great Yarmouth with the loss of a passenger. Her crew were rescued by rocket apparatus.

== 14 October ==
List of shipwrecks: 14 October 1822
Ship	State	Description
Agenoria	United Kingdom	The Humber Keel was driven ashore and wrecked between Great Yarmouth and Winterton-on-Sea, Norfolk with the loss of all hands.
Aurora	United Kingdom	The ship departed from Falmouth, Cornwall for Seville, Spain. No further trace, presumed foundered with the loss of all hands.
Dolphin	United Kingdom	The ship was driven ashore and wrecked at Winterton-on-Sea with the loss of all but one of her crew.
Eleanor	United Kingdom	The ship was driven ashore 3 nautical miles (5.6 km) east of Wells-next-the-Sea, Norfolk. She was refloated on 20 October and taken in to Wells-next-the-Sea.
Good Intent	United Kingdom	The sloop was wrecked on the Nayland Rock, in the North Sea off Margate, Kent. Her crew were rescued. She was on a voyage from London to Cowes, Isle of Wight.
Hebe	United Kingdom	The Arbroath-registered brig was wrecked on the Nayland Rock, Margate.
Hebe	United Kingdom	The London-registered ship foundered off Margate.
Henry	United Kingdom	The ship was driven ashore and wrecked between Wells-next-the-Sea and Blakeney, Norfolk with the loss of her captain. She was on a voyage from Memel, Prussia to London.
Hibernia	United Kingdom	The ship was driven ashore at Domesnes, Russia and was abandoned by her crew. She was on a voyage from Riga, Russia to London.
Hope	United Kingdom	The ship foundered in the North Sea off Winterton-on-Sea.
Hopewell	United Kingdom	The ship was driven ashore and wrecked between Great Yarmouth and Winterton-on-Sea with the loss of all hands.
Nelson	United Kingdom	The brig was driven ashore at Wells-next-the-Sea.
Lady Hill	United Kingdom	The ship departed from St. John's, Newfoundland, British North America for Alicante, Spain. No further trace, presumed foundered with the loss of all hands.
Neptunus	Norway	The ship foundered in the Dogger Bank. Her crew were rescued. She was on a voyage from Guernsey, Channel Islands to Dram, Norway.
HMS Protector	Royal Navy	The survey ship was driven ashore at Winterton-on-Sea.
HMRC Ranger	Board of Customs	The cutter was wrecked on the Haisborough Sands, in the North Sea off the coast of Norfolk with the loss of all 30 crew.
Sarah and Mary	United Kingdom	The ship was driven ashore at Lowestoft, Suffolk. Her crew were rescued. She was on a voyage from Boston, Lincolnshire to London.
St. Willebrood	Netherlands	The ship foundered in the North Sea off Dunkirk, Nord, France with the loss of all hands. She was on a voyage from Great Yarmouth, Norfolk to Gravelines, Nord.
Supply	United Kingdom	The ship was driven ashore and wrecked at Winterton-on-Sea with the loss of one life. The survivors were rescued by rocket apparatus.
Ulysses	United Kingdom	The ship was driven ashore and wrecked between Great Yarmouth and Winterton-on-Sea with the loss of all hands.
Wetherill	United Kingdom	The ship was driven ashore and wrecked near Wells-next-the-Sea. Her crew were rescued.

== 15 October ==
List of shipwrecks: 15 October 1822
Ship	State	Description
Brothers	United Kingdom	The ship was driven ashore and wrecked at Bonavista, Newfoundland, British North America with the loss of two lives.
Chance	(United Kingdom of Great Britain and Ireland) British North America	The ship was wrecked on Oderin Island, Newfoundland.
Coaster	(United Kingdom of Great Britain and Ireland) British North America	The schooner was driven ashore and wrecked on "Bancake", Newfoundland. Her crew were rescued.
Dorothea Louisa	Bremen	The ship was driven ashore at Fedderwarden, Kingdom of Hanover. She wason a voyage from Liverpool, Lancashire, United Kingdom to Bremen.
Mary Ann	United Kingdom	The ship was wrecked in The Narrows, St. John's, Newfoundland with the loss of a crew member.
St. Martin's Planter	United Kingdom	The ship was driven ashore and damaged of the Sparrow Hawk, in the North Sea off Tynemouth, Northumberland. She was later refloated and taken in to South Shields, County Durham.

== 16 October ==
List of shipwrecks: 16 October 1822
Ship	State	Description
Alexander	Netherlands	The schooner was lost off Bram's Point, Surinam.
Brothers	(United Kingdom of Great Britain and Ireland) British North America	The ship was driven ashore and wrecked at Bonavista, Newfoundlandb with the loss of two lives.
Malvina	United Kingdom	The ship ran afround on the Stoney Binks, in the North Sea off the mouth of the Humber. She was refloated but was consequently beached on Spurn Point, Yorkshire. Malvina was refloated on 29 October and taken in to Hull, Yorkshire.
Vine	United Kingdom	The brig was driven ashore and wrecked at "Sandhale", Lincolnshire. Her crew were rescued.

== 17 October ==
List of shipwrecks: 17 October 1822
Ship	State	Description
Economy	United Kingdom	The sloop was wrecked on the Seal Sand, in The Wash. Her crew were rescued by King's Lynn fishing boats. She was on a voyage from London to Wisbech, Cambridgeshire.
Washington	United States	The ship was wrecked in the Turks Islands. She was on a voyage from New York to Port-au-Prince, Haiti.

== 18 October ==
List of shipwrecks: 18 October 1822
Ship	State	Description
Alexander	Netherlands	The ship foundered in a squall off Bram's Point, Surinam.
Anson	United States	The ship was driven ashore near St. John's, Newfoundland, British North America. She was on a voyage from Boston, Massachusetts to St. John's. Anson was later refloated and taken in to St. John's.
Bee	United Kingdom	The ship was wrecked at Crow Point, Pembrokeshire. Her crew were rescued, She was on a voyage from Pwllheli, Caernarvonshire to Gloucester.
Bell	United Kingdom	The ship was driven ashore and wrecked in Freshwater Bay, Pembrokeshire. Her crew were rescued. She was on a voyage from Pwllheli, Caernarvonshire to Gloucester.
Good Intent	United Kingdom	The smack was driven ashore 40 nautical miles (74 km) north of Bayonne, Basses-Pyrénées, France with the loss of all hands. The wreck was burnt on the orders of the local Board of Health. She was on a voyage from Great Yarmouth, Norfolk to Gijón, Spain.
Young Man's Companion	United States	The schooner was driven ashore at Wilmington, Delaware. She was on a voyage from Wilmington to the West Indies.

== 19 October ==
List of shipwrecks: 19 October 1822
Ship	State	Description
Ann and Mary	United Kingdom	The sloop was wrecked at Brighton, Sussex.
Expedition	United Kingdom	The brig capsized in the English Channel off Rottingdean, Sussex with the loss of her captain. The wreck drifted ashore 4 nautical miles (7.4 km) west of Newhaven, Sussex and the four survivors were rescued.
Friend's Goodwill	United Kingdom	The ship was driven ashore and wrecked at Brighton.
Hendrika	Unknown	The ship was driven ashore east of Brighton. She was on a voyage from London to Bilbao, Spain. Hendrika was later refloated and taken in to Newhaven.
Hope	United Kingdom	The sloop was abandoned in the Atlantic Ocean off St. Ives, Cornwall. Her crew were rescued by Elizabeth (United Kingdom). Hope was on a voyage from Youghal, County Cork to Portsmouth, Hampshire.
Independent	United Kingdom	The collier, a brig, capsized in the English Channel with the loss of one of her five crew. The wreck came ashore 2 nautical miles (3.7 km) east of Rottingdean.
Marie Ann	France	The ship was wrecked in the Seine near Bardouville, Seine-Inférieure. She was on a voyage from Marseille, Bouches-du-Rhône to Rouen, Seine-Inférieure.
Mary Ann	United Kingdom	The ship was driven ashore and wrecked at Brighton.
Stockton	United Kingdom	The collier, a brig, was driven ashore and wrecked at Brighton.

== 20 October ==
List of shipwrecks: 20 October 1822
Ship	State	Description
Hero	United Kingdom	The ship was wrecked on the Forlorn Rock, off the Saltee Islands, County Wexford. She was on a voyage from New Orleans, Louisiana, United States to London.
John and Susan	United Kingdom	The ship was driven ashore and wrecked at Sidmouth, Devon.
Melantho	United Kingdom	The ship was driven ashore on Saltholm, Denmark.
Nestor	United States	The ship was driven ashore on Saltholm.
Two Brothers	United Kingdom	The ship was driven ashore at Sidmouth.
Sinbad	(United Kingdom of Great Britain and Ireland) New South Wales	The schooner was driven ashore and wrecked at Port Stephens. Her crew survived.

== 21 October ==
List of shipwrecks: 21 October 1822
Ship	State	Description
Dispatch	United Kingdom	The ship ran aground at Cardiff, Glamorgan and was severely damaged. She was on a voyage from Cardiff to Naples, Kingdom of the Two Sicilies.
Fanny	United Kingdom	The sloop sank at Whitehaven, Cumberland. She was on a voyage from Wexford to Liverpool, Lancashire.

== 22 October ==
List of shipwrecks: 22 October 1822
Ship	State	Description
La Plata	Spain	The ship was lost near Cape Charles, Virginia, United States. All on board were rescued. She was on a voyage from Havana, Cuba to Baltimore, Maryland.

== 23 October ==
List of shipwrecks: 23 October 1822
Ship	State	Description
Active	United Kingdom	The sloop was wrecked at St. Ives, Cornwall. Her crew were rescued.
Autumn	United Kingdom	The ship was driven ashore at Scarborough, Yorkshire.
Caledonia	United Kingdom	The schooner foundered in the Atlantic Ocean (46°38′N 9°40′W). She was on a voyage from Liverpool, Lancashire to Porto, Portugal.
Dove	(United Kingdom of Great Britain and Ireland) British North America	The ship was driven ashore at Corcubión, Spain. She was on a voyage from Newfoundland to Porto, Portugal.
Echo	United States	The ship was wrecked on the Malchipungo Shoals. Her crew were rescued. She was on a voyage from New York to Alexandria, Virginia.
Resolution	United Kingdom	The ship was wrecked in Rocky Bay with the loss of two of her crew. She was on a voyage from Youghall, County Cork to Portsmouth, Hampshire.
St. Michael	United Kingdom	The ship was driven ashore near Penmon, Anglesey. She was on a voyage from Dungarvan, County Antrim to Liverpool, Lancashire.
Success	United Kingdom	The ship was driven ashore and wrecked at Scarborough.
Resolution	United Kingdom	The ship was wrecked in Rocky Bay. She was on a voyage from Youghal, County Cork to Portsmouth, Hampshire.

== 24 October ==
List of shipwrecks: 24 October 1822
Ship	State	Description
Hawke	United Kingdom	The ship was wrecked at the mouth of the River Tees. Her crew were rescued by the Hartlepool Lifeboat. She was on a voyage from Sunderland, County Durham to Southwold, Suffolk
Mary Ann	United Kingdom	The ship was wrecked in the Atlantic Ocean with the loss of two of her fourteen crew. The survivors were rescued on 27 October by Lester (United Kingdom). Mary Ann was on a voyage from Quebec City, Lower Canada, British North America to London.
St. Martin's Planter	United Kingdom	The ship was wrecked on the North Garr, in the River Tees. Her crew were rescued by the Redcar Lifeboat. She was on a voyage from South Shields, County Durham to Stockton-on-Tees, Yorkshire

== 25 October ==
List of shipwrecks: 25 October 1822
Ship	State	Description
Betsey	(United Kingdom of Great Britain and Ireland) British North America	The ship was driven ashore and wrecked near Fermuse, Newfoundland. Her crew were rescued.
Jannies	United Kingdom	The ship was driven ashore on the Isle of Man. She was on a voyage from Newry, County Down to Liverpool, Lancashire.
Scheen	flag unknown	The ship was driven ashore and wrecked in the Orkney Islands, United Kingdom. She was on a voyage from "Scheen" to a Mediterranean port.

== 26 October ==
List of shipwrecks: 26 October 1822
Ship	State	Description
Actaeon	United Kingdom	The ship was wrecked in the D'Entrecasteaux Channel. Her crew survived.

== 27 October ==
List of shipwrecks: 27 October 1822
Ship	State	Description
Auguste	Hamburg	The ship was driven ashore and wrecked at Shrewsbury, New Jersey, United States with the loss of a crew member. She was on a voyage from Hamburg to New York, United States.
Enterprize	United States	The schooner was lost in the New Inlet.
Jeune George	France	The brig foundered in the English Channel off the Casquets. Her crew survived, She was on a voyage from Rouen, Seine-Inférieure to Normantier, Vendée.

== 28 October ==
List of shipwrecks: 28 October 1822
Ship	State	Description
Actæon	United Kingdom	The ship was lost off the coast of Van Diemen's Land.

== 29 October ==
List of shipwrecks: 29 October 1822
Ship	State	Description
George and Robert	United Kingdom	The sloop was abandoned in the Atlantic Ocean. Her crew were rescued by Etna (United States). She was on a voyage from Falmouth, Jamaica to Boston, Massachusetts, United States.
North Star	United Kingdom	The ship was driven ashore at Waterford. She was on a voyage from Cardiff, Glamorgan to Dublin.
Regent	United Kingdom	The ship was driven ashore on the coast of China. She had not been refloated by 27 November.

== 30 October ==
List of shipwrecks: 30 October 1822
Ship	State	Description
Alicampane	United Kingdom	The ship departed from Placentia Bay for St. John's, Newfoundland, British North America. Presumed subsequently foundered off St. Mary's, Newfoundland with the loss of all but the ship's dog.
Hibernia	(United Kingdom of Great Britain and Ireland) British North America	The ship foundered in the Atlantic Ocean with the loss of all but one of her crew. The survivor was rescued by George (United Kingdom). Hibernia was on a voyage from Yarmouth, Nova Scotia to Barbados.
Jong Jacob	Netherlands	The ship was lost near Rügenwalde, Prussia. She was on a voyage from Elbing to Amsterdam, North Holland.
Victory	United Kingdom	The ship struck a rock off Carne, County Wexford and foundered. Her crew were rescued.

== 31 October ==
List of shipwrecks: 31 October 1822
Ship	State	Description
Two Sisters	United Kingdom	The smack was lost near St. Govan's Head with the loss of three of the five people on board. She was on a voyage from Bristol, Gloucestershire to Milford Haven, Pembrokeshire.

== Unknown date ==
List of shipwrecks: Unknown date in October 1822
Ship	State	Description
Afit	Bremen	The brig was abandoned in the Atlantic Ocean before 16 October.
Alpha	United Kingdom	The ship was driven ashore south of the mouth of the River Don, Aberdeen between 9 and 12 October.
Anne	United Kingdom	The ship was driven ashore near Redcar, North Riding of Yorkshire. She was refloated on 30 October.
Barbara	United Kingdom	The ship was driven ashore near Redcar.
Deveron	(United Kingdom of Great Britain and Ireland) New South Wales	The brig was wrecked on Bruni Island.
George	United Kingdom	The ship was abandoned in the Atlantic Ocean 400 nautical miles (740 km) off Cape Clear Island, County Cork. Her crew were rescued by Cæsar (United Kingdom).
Governor Brisbane	(United Kingdom of Great Britain and Ireland) New South Wales	The ship was driven ashore and wrecked at Port Dalrymple. She was on a voyage from Hobart, Van Diemen's Land to Mauritius.
Hannah & Elizabeth	United Kingdom	The ship was driven ashore at Weybourne, Norfolk. She was later refloated and taken in to Great Yarmouth, Norfolk for repairs.
Hibernia	United Kingdom	The ship was driven ashore and wrecked at Domesnes, Russia and was abandoned by her crew. She was on a voyage from Riga, Russia to London.
Hope	United Kingdom	The sloop was wrecked in the Sound of Kyleakin. She was on a voyage from Christiansand, Norway to Culrain, Sutherland.
Jemima	United Kingdom	The ship was driven ashore in Sligo Bay. She was on a voyage from Miramichi Bay yo Maryport, Cumberland.
John and Susan	United Kingdom	The sloop was driven ashore and wrecked at Sidmouth, Devon before 21 October. Her crew were rescued.
Martha	United Kingdom	The ship was lost in New Brunswick, British North America.
Mercurius	United Kingdom	The ship foundered in the North Sea off Huntly, Aberdeenshire. She was on a voyage from Newcastle upon Tyne, Northumberland to a Dutch port.
Minerva	United Kingdom	The ship was driven ashore near Redcar.
Pomona	United Kingdom	The ship was abandoned in the Irish Sea off the Calf of Man, Isle of Man. She was on a voyage from Belfast, County Antrim to Liverpool, Lancashire.
Robert	United Kingdom	The ship was driven ashore at Putzig, Prussia. She was on a voyage from Swinemünde, Prussia to Liverpool. Robert was later refloated and taken in to Danzig.
Rosalia	Spain	The schooner was lost in Charleston Bay. Her crew were rescued.
Savannah	United States	The ship was wrecked on Long Island, New York with the loss of all hands. She was on a voyage from Liverpool, Lancashire, United Kingdom to New York City.
Simon Taylor	United Kingdom	The ship was lost in New Brunswick.
Squirrel	United Kingdom	The brig was abandoned in the North Sea off the coast of Norfolk. She was later boarded by men from Wells-next-the-Sea and taken in to that port.
Statira	United Kingdom	The ship was wrecked on the Frying Pan Shoals, in the Atlantic Ocean off the coast of North Carolina, United States. Her crew survived. She was on a voyage from Havana, Cuba to London.
Tribley	United Kingdom	The ship was driven ashore near Redcar.
Waterloo	United Kingdom	The ship was driven ashore and wrecked on the coast of the Florida Territory. She was on a voyage from Jamaica to Cork.
