= 1905 New Forest by-election =

UK parliamentary by-election

The 1905 New Forest by-election was a Parliamentary by-election held on 6 December 1905. The constituency returned one Member of Parliament (MP) to the House of Commons of the United Kingdom, elected by the first past the post voting system.

It was the last by-election of the 27th Parliament to take place before the 1906 general election.

== Vacancy ==
Hon. John Douglas-Scott-Montagu had been Conservative MP for the seat of New Forest since the 1892 general election. His father, Henry John Douglas-Scott-Montagu died on 4 November 1905. He succeeded his father as Baron Montagu of Beaulieu and entered the House of Lords.

== Electoral history ==
The seat had been Conservative since it was created in 1885. There had not been a contested election in the seat since 1892. The voting figures then were;

General election January 1892: New Forest Electorate 10,126
Party	Candidate	Votes	%	±%
Conservative	John Douglas-Scott-Montagu	4,481	54.6	N/A
Liberal	Joseph King	3,726	45.4	New
Majority		755	9.2	N/A
Turnout		8,207	81.0	N/A
Conservative hold		Swing	N/A	

== Candidates ==
- The local Conservative Association selected 33-year-old Henry Francis Compton as their candidate to defend the seat. He was standing for parliament for the first time. He was the son of Henry Compton, of Minstead Manor House, Hampshire. He served as a Magistrate and as an officer in the 4th Volunteer Battalion Hampshire Regiment. His grandfather and uncle had also been Members of Parliament, the latter sitting for the New Forest Constituency between 1885 and 1892.
- The local Liberal Association selected 69-year-old Robert Hobart as their candidate to gain the seat. He was also standing for parliament for the first time. Hobart was the oldest son of Henry Hobart, third son of the 3rd Earl of Buckinghamshire, and Charlotte Selina Moore, daughter of Richard Moore. He was a civil servant in the War Office between 1860 and 1900, and was appointed a Companion of the Order of the Bath (CB) in 1885. In October 1901 the Earl Marshal, the Duke of Norfolk, appointed him a Secretary to the Earl Marshal's office, to work on preparations for the 1902 coronation of King Edward VII. He received the 1902 Coronation medal and was knighted as a Knight Commander of the Royal Victorian Order (KCVO) for his services.

== Campaign ==
Polling Day was fixed for the 6 December 1905, 32 days after the vacancy became known.

The two most prominent issues at the time of the by-election were Irish Home Rule and Tariff Reform. The issue of Home Rule was one that had split the Liberal Party back in 1886 with the Liberal Unionists joining with the Conservatives to oppose it. The issue of Tariff reform was one that was currently dividing the Conservative Party, who had seen many of their Free Trade supporters leave to join the Liberals. Leading Liberal Unionist, Joseph Chamberlain had managed to persuade Conservative prime minister, Arthur Balfour and the party as a whole to support the introduction of trade tariffs on imports. The Liberal Party argued that these measures would increase the cost of food. Divisions within the government on this issue and others widened and on 4 December 1905, two days before polling day, the Conservative government of Arthur Balfour collapsed and he resigned as prime minister. Liberal Leader Sir Henry Campbell-Bannerman then formed a government.

== Result ==
The Conservatives narrowly held onto the seat but the fact that the Liberals had polled far better than they had in 1892 when the Conservatives nationally fell short of an overall majority, was a good indicator that the Liberals could win the next General Election:

1905 New Forest by-election Electorate 10,818
Party	Candidate	Votes	%	±%
Conservative	Henry Francis Compton	4,539	51.1	N/A
Liberal	Robert Hobart	4,340	48.9	New
Majority		199	2.2	N/A
Turnout		8,879	82.1	N/A
Conservative hold		Swing	N/A	

This is how The Saturday Review viewed the result: "The New Forest Division of Hampshire has returned Mr. Compton the Conservative by a small majority; reduced, still a majority. A seat or two does not make a world of difference just now, and we could half wish that the New Forest electors had shown the grace to welcome the new Prime Minister by returning his supporter, Sir Henry Hobart. It would have been a pretty form of congratulation. However we can congratulate Sir Henry Hobart — a really earnest Liberal and very anxious to sit for a Hampshire constituency - on his good fortune; it is not every man to whom is given, as Sir Henry will be, the chance to have a second shot within a month or so."

== Aftermath ==
As Parliament was not sitting at the time, Compton was unable to take his seat. Prime Minister Campbell-Bannerman then dissolved parliament and called a General Election, at which Compton was defeated by Hobart:

General election January 1906: New Forest Electorate 11,030
Party	Candidate	Votes	%	±%
Liberal	Robert Hobart	4,949	50.2	+1.3
Conservative	Henry Francis Compton	4,901	49.8	−1.3
Majority		48	0.4	N/A
Turnout		9,850	89.3	+7.2
Liberal gain from Conservative		Swing	+1.3	
