= St Mary's Hospital, Wolverhampton =

Building in Wolverhampton, England

Coordinates: 52.5865°N 2.1225°W

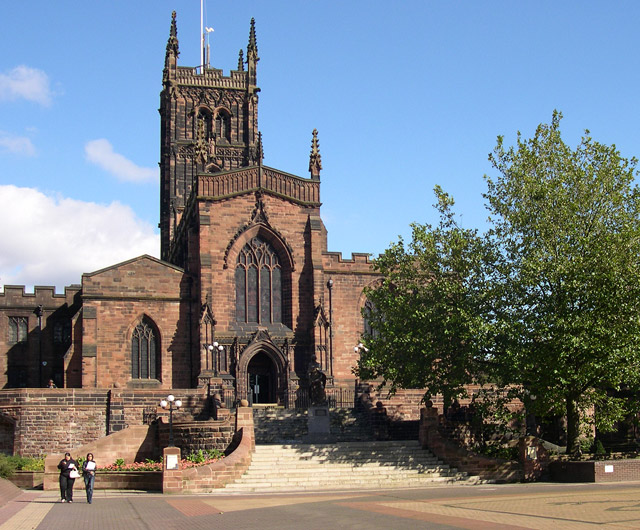
St Peter's Collegiate Church, Wolverhampton

St Mary's Hospital was a medieval almshouse and chantry in Wolverhampton, associated with St Peter's Collegiate Church. It was founded in the 1390s and disappeared with the abolition of the chantries in the reign of Edward VI. The only vestige today is in the form of a street name.

== Location ==
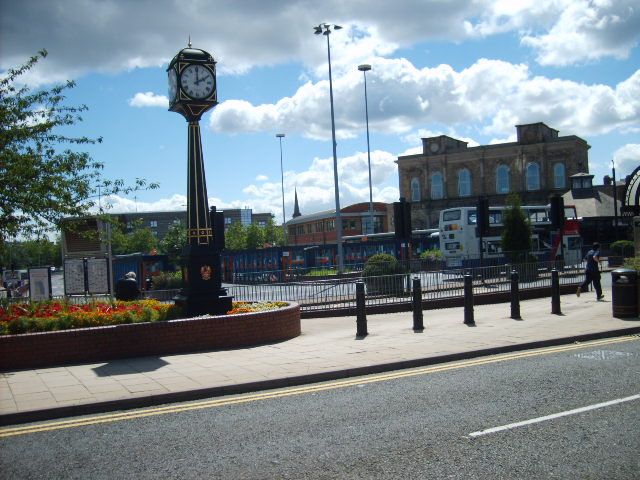
Wolverhampton bus station from Railway Drive: this probably occupies much of the hospital site.

The Victoria County History places St Mary's Hospital on the east side of Wolverhampton, possibly on the site of the later Pepper's Croft, which bordered Can Lane to the East. This street was already lost in 1970, when the VCH account was written, although it was still known from the name of a wharf on the BCN Main Line canal. It had been replaced by Railway Street, which continued south as Pipers Row. This street seems to take its name from John Pepard, the first known chaplain of the hospital. Today it is incorporated into Wolverhampton bus station, which, together with the ring road, now takes up what must have been the hospital site.

== Foundation and context ==
St Mary's Hospital was established through the efforts of William Waterfall, a generous layman, and Clement Leveson, a chaplain at St. Peter's, during the years 1392-95. Leveson was vicar of three of the prebends of St Peter's: Wobaston, Hatherton and Monmore. He and Waterfall were both "wardens of the light", an institution founded in 1385 to tend a light in honour of St Peter in the collegiate church. This activity by prominent local families was set against a background of neglect by the dean, Richard Postell, and most of the prebendaries or canons. Postell had been pocketing the money intended, under a grant of Henry I, to support the work of six chaplains in the church, and was swindling lay people who deposited money with him, including Roger Leveson, John Salford and John Waterfall. It seems from this that impetus for pious works was coming from outside the chapter of the church and that the Levesons and Waterfalls were already among the chief supporters of this movement in the town.

On 4 August 1392 Richard II issued a licence to Clement Luson (which represents the counterintuitive pronunciation of the name) and William Waterfall in exchange for a five marks. This permitted them to found their hospital in honour of God and St Mary and to alienate in mortmain to it a dwelling or messuage and three acres of land to provide accommodation for the chaplain, and presumably the hospital itself. The purpose of the foundation was for the inmates to pray continually for the good estate of the founders and of Joan, William's wife. On 27 September Waterfall obtained a licence for a much larger fee, 45 marks, to endow the hospital with property and rents to the value of £10 annually.

The site was only about 400 metres south east of St. Peter's but it fell outside the manor of Wolverhampton, in the manor of Stow Heath, so in 1394 Leveson and Waterfall also obtained the permission of the lord of the manor, Hugh, Lord Burnell, a powerful marcher lord. By this time Postell was dead, so in 1395 it was Dean Lawrence Allerthorpe who gave final permission, reserving a final veto over the foundation and the right to amend and interpret its regulations.

== Regulations and functions ==
The foundation fell outside the general run of urban hospitals for the poor, which tended to be connected with cathedral clergy, borough authorities or guilds. The regulations vested patronage in William and Joan Waterfall and their heirs, but if they should lapse to John Waterfall, probably William's brother, then to the Leveson family. The patron had the right to present the chaplain to the dean for induction and to select the inmates. The royal licences had both specified one chaplain and six poor persons, so it is clear that both men and women could be admitted.

The chaplain was to say Mass and Vespers daily for the residents, and prayers were to be offered for the souls of Clement Leveson, William and Joan Waterfall, Lord Burnell, and Lawrence Allerthorpe. However, he was not to administer communion to the residents: they could receive that only from a chaplain of the parish. Those who were too infirm to receive communion could be given holy bread and water by the hospital chaplain. This type of regulation, by which hospitals were prevented from competing with the parish church, were normal: communion at the major festivals was almost always monopolised by the church, although many permitted communion in the hospitals on other Sundays, which was not the case at Wolverhampton. Specific dispensations and arrangement for the sick were also normal. The administration of sacred bread or eulogia, distinct from the eucharistic host, was a common medieval practice, generally intended for catechumens, although also taken home for those absent from communion, which parallels its use at St Mary's as a substitute for Mass. It was also administered to the poor whose feet were washed on Maundy Thursday. Holy water too would be renewed every week because it was an essential element of the communion, presented in the Offertory, and the two elements together were favoured for breaking the fast on Sunday.

The first recorded chaplain was John Pepard, inducted in 1402. Presumably this is why the Wolverhampton is known to have had a Pepers Chapell, later Pyper's Chapel. Gerald Mander, an important historian of Wolverhampton, suggested this was a chapel within St Peter's church, situated in the south transept, and possibly named after a Pipe family, but the hospital and its chaplain seem to fit the known circumstances better. The only other known chaplain or warden was Thomas Bradshaw, presented by James Leveson in 1524. The Waterfall line must have expired by this time and the patronage passes to a branch of the increasingly powerful Leveson family. Thomas Bradshaw is probably the person of that name known as a vicar choral of St Peter's in 1533 and perhaps as a priest at Wombourne from 1533 to 1564.

== Dissolution ==
The last mention of Pyper's Chapel was in 1541. It would have been included in the general abolition of chantries under Edward's VI but, like all of the guilds and chantries of St Peter's, it is absent from the Staffordshire returns, apparently because accounting for them was left to the Berkshire commissioners: this was because the deanery of St Peter's was united with that of St George's Chapel, Windsor Castle. However, the Berkshire commissioners did not comply. The hospital property seems to have passed into the Leveson family.
