= Hampden House =

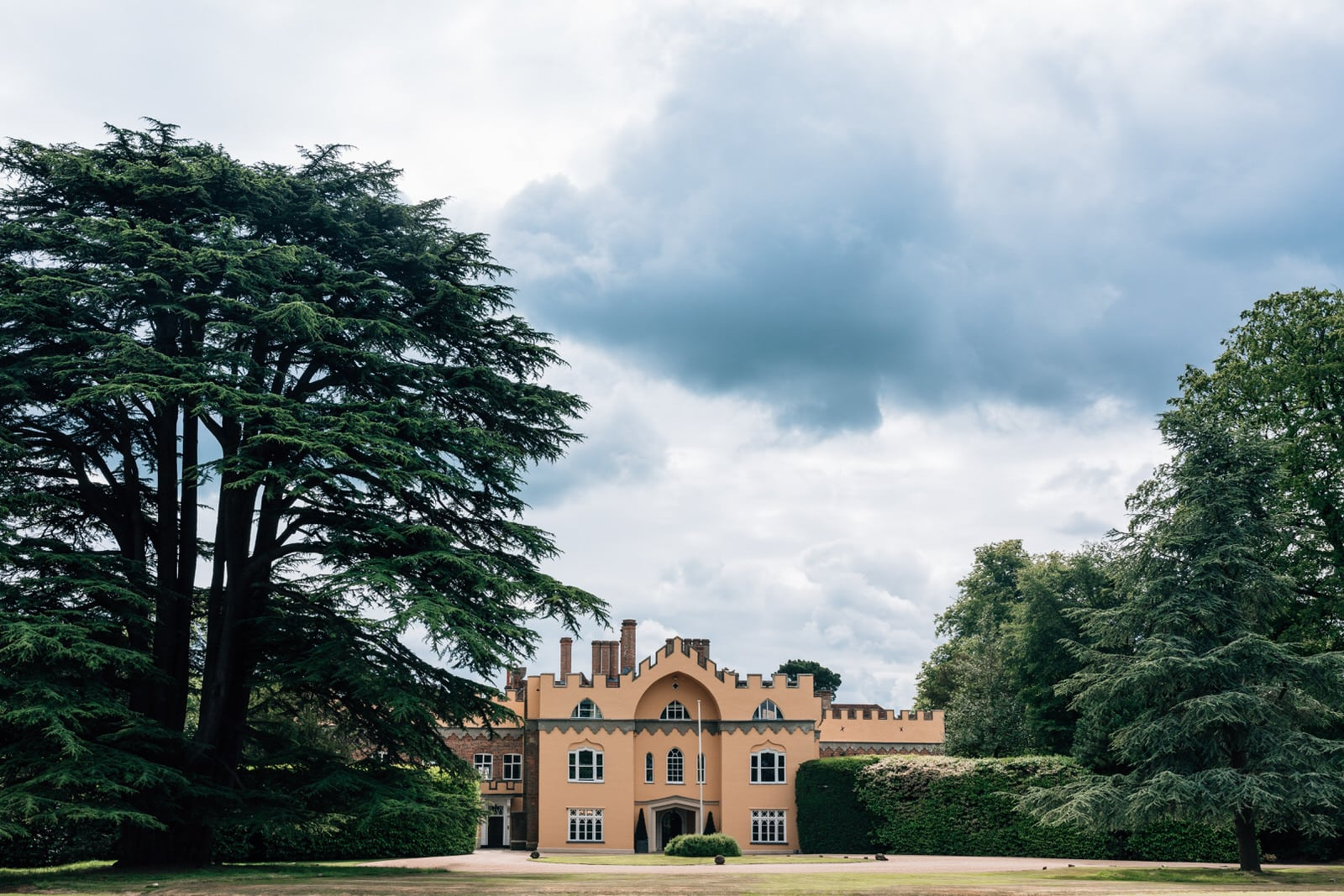
- Hampden House

- Location within Buckinghamshire
- 51°42′50″N 0°46′26″W
- Type: Country house
- Location: Great Hampden

Site notes
- Area: Buckinghamshire

Listed Building – Grade I
- Official name: Hampden House
- Designated: 21 June 1955
- Reference no.: 1311378

Listed Building – Grade II
- Official name: Stable Building at Hampden House
- Designated: 28 January 1982
- Reference no.: 1331983

Hampden House is a country house in the village of Great Hampden, between Great Missenden and Princes Risborough in Buckinghamshire. It is named after the Hampden family. The Hampdens (later Earls of Buckinghamshire) are recorded as owning the site from before the Norman Conquest. They lived continually in the house until 1938.

== Early history ==
The core of the present house is Elizabethan. However the south wing known as King John's tower, for some anachronistic reason, dates to the 14th century. This tower is constructed of clunch, a building material peculiar to Buckinghamshire, which is a combination of chalk and mud. The tower has traceried Gothic windows and the remains of the original spiral staircase.

A legend, relevant to this part of the house, is that King Edward III and the Black Prince stayed at Hampden House. During the stay the prince and his Hampden host were jousting, when a quarrel arose, during which the prince was punched in the face by his host. This act of lèse majesté caused the king and Prince to quit the place in great wrath, and cause their host to forfeit some of his estates to the crown. There is, however no documentary evidence for this act, or of the subsequent revenge although the Black Prince is known to have possessed land in nearby Princes Risborough during his life.

The greater part of the original house was rebuilt in brick in the 17th century, this was again altered in the 18th century. The East wing overlooking the gardens is of a severe classical 18th century style, built between two earlier wings.

The chief feature of the grounds is 'The Glade', an avenue through the woods bordered by rhododendrons and ancient oaks. It is terminated by two small lodges known, because of their design, as the 'Pepper Pots'. It is said that the avenue was cut through the wood to facilitate easy access to the house for Queen Elizabeth I when she was entertained at Hampden, during one of her progresses, by Griffith Hampden Esq.

== Gothic rebuilding ==
It is the north and west ranges of the house that have never received the architectural acclaim they deserve, remodelled circa 1750 to a design by the architect Thomas Iremonger, with battlements and ogee topped windows, they are a form of Gothic Revival known as Strawberry Hill. This style predates the so-called invention of Strawberry Hill Gothic at Horace Walpole's house by nearly twenty years.

The interior of the house was also remodelled at this time, when a suite of magnificent state rooms were created with remarkable rococo ceilings, and superb marble fireplaces. One fireplace is of especial note carved by Sir Henry Cheere. The 60-foot-long (18 m), panelled, Great Hall with its huge fireplace is the largest room in the house.

== Hampden and Hobart families ==
Also in the grounds is the parish church, containing many memorials to the Hampden family including a monument to John Hampden, the celebrated patriot, who died of wounds received at the Battle of Chalgrove during the English Civil War in 1643 fighting for the Parliamentarians. He had earlier achieved fame and notoriety by his refusal to pay the Ship Money tax, introduced by the near bankrupt Charles I. Hampden was prosecuted for refusing to pay the tax on his lands in Buckinghamshire and Oxfordshire. He was tried and found guilty, and consequently became a public hero, known as 'The Patriot'. The spot where he refused to pay is marked by a monument in the grand avenue at Hampden House, although the exact location of the actual site is in dispute.

Like many old and aristocratic families, the Hampdens, for generations closely associated with the Whig party, eventually found themselves with financial problems. These were exacerbated by Richard Hampden who, while Treasurer of the Navy, invested heavily personally, and with government funds, in the South Sea Bubble; the resultant crash in 1720 was devastating for the family fortune. Large parts of the estate were sold until only the house and its immediate surroundings remained in the family's hands. The family never completely regained its former position or wealth.

The true male line of the Hampden family eventually died out. In 1824, the 5th Earl of Buckinghamshire inherited Hampden House and its estates from the heirless Hampden family. In 1656, his ancestor Sir John Hobart, 3rd Baronet had married Mary Hampden, daughter and co-heiress of "the Patriot" John Hampden. The 5th Earl then joined the Hampden name to his own. The present head of the family is George Hobart-Hampden, 10th Earl of Buckinghamshire.

== Hampden House today ==
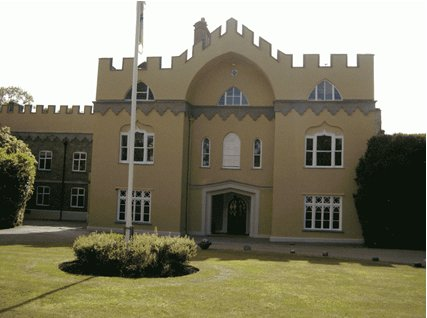
Hampden House Main Entrance

As a result of the family's financial problems, Hampden House suffered; cracked brickwork was not repaired but rendered in cement, necessary repairs were not carried out, and general deterioration set in, until in 1938 the family decided to let the house. The first tenants were a private girls' school. The interiors suffered greatly under this regime. The second tenants, Hammer film company, specialising in the making of horror films, no doubt saw the gothic aspects of the house as an attraction as they appeared in many of their films, and notably the 1980 "Hammer House of Horror" UK TV series and 1984s Hammer House of Mystery and Suspense.

Salvation for Hampden House finally came with its freehold sale, to Market Run-off Services, now Hampden Plc, a Specialist Insurance and Financial Support Services company, which between 1986 and 1989 executed a huge programme of essential rebuilding. The magnificent state rooms were restored to their former glory, while the unseen upper floors and service areas were converted to internally modern offices. These offices have since been converted to luxurious bedrooms.

The house and grounds are still used occasionally for filming, and though not open to the public, the state rooms are available for hire as a wedding venue Hampden Weddings. The estate also boasts a driven pheasant shoot voted one of the twenty best in England by 'The Field' magazine. The building is a Grade I listed building.
