= Henry Compton =

Henry Compton may refer to:

- Henry Compton (bishop) (1632–1713), English bishop and nobleman
- Henry Compton, 1st Baron Compton (1544–1589), English peer, MP for Old Sarum
- Henry Combe Compton (1789–1866), British Conservative Party politician, Member of Parliament for South Hampshire, 1835–1857
- Henry Compton (actor) (Charles Mackenzie, 1805–1877), English actor
- Henry Compton (MP) (c. 1584–c. 1649), English politician who sat in the House of Commons variously between 1601 and 1640
- Henry Francis Compton (1872–1943), British Conservative politician
