= Albinia Hobart, Countess of Buckinghamshire =

English noblewoman and socialite (1738–1816)

The Right Honourable The Countess of Buckinghamshire
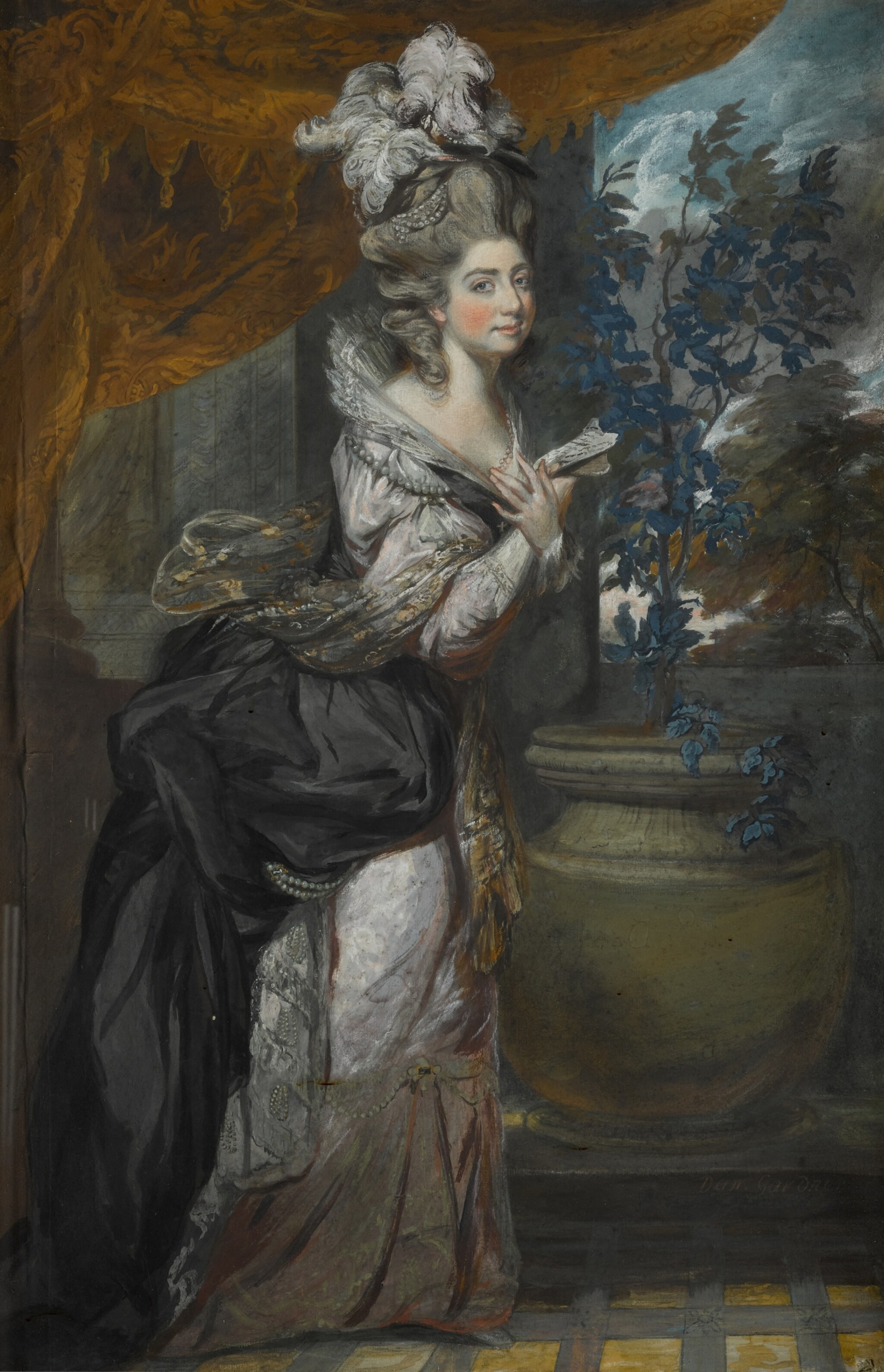
- Portrait by Daniel Gardner
- Born: Albinia Bertie; 3 November 1738
- Died: 11 March 1816; Nocton, England
- Known for: Extravagance
- Spouse: George Hobart, 3rd Earl of Buckinghamshire (m. 1757; died 1804)
- Children: Robert Hobart, 4th Earl of Buckinghamshire; Hon. George Hobart; Lt. Charles Hobart; Rev. Hon. Henry Hobart; Lady Albinia Cumberland; Lady Henrietta Sullivan; Maria North, Countess of Guilford; Lady Charlotte Disbrowe
- Parents: Lord Vere Bertie; Anne Casey
- Relatives: Edward Cromwell Disbrowe (grandson)

Albinia Vere Hobart, Countess of Buckinghamshire (née Bertie; 3 November 1738 – 11 March 1816) was an English noblewoman and socialite. She was the co-heiress of her father, Lord Vere Bertie, and became the Countess of Buckinghamshire by marriage in 1793. Her lifestyle and size made her the subject and victim of cartoons by James Gillray and others; she figures in more than 50 satirical prints.

== Early life ==
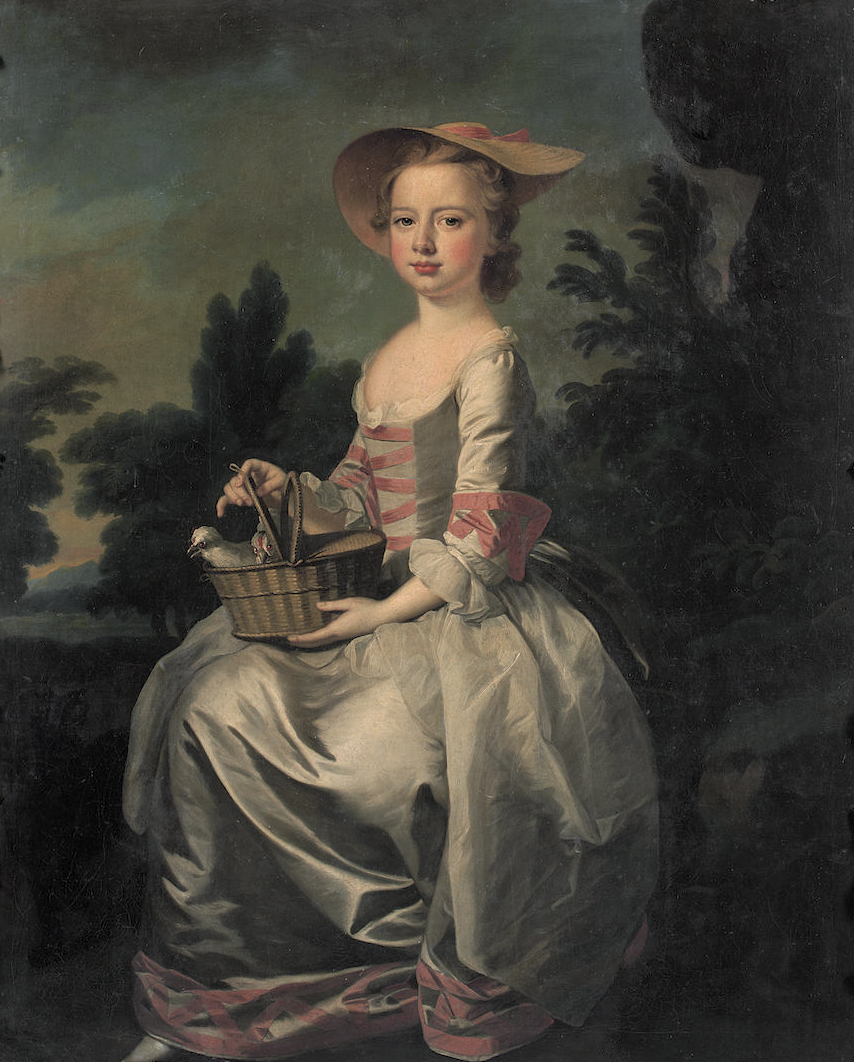
Albinia Bertie as a young girl, by Thomas Hudson

Hobart was born Albinia Bertie to Lord Vere Bertie and Anne Casey. Her mother's father was Sir Cecil Wray, 11th Baronet; Anne Casey was illegitimate but her father's heiress, left in his will dated 21 January 1735/6 £14,000 (equivalent to £2,612,000 in 2025) and all his estates.

== Reputation ==
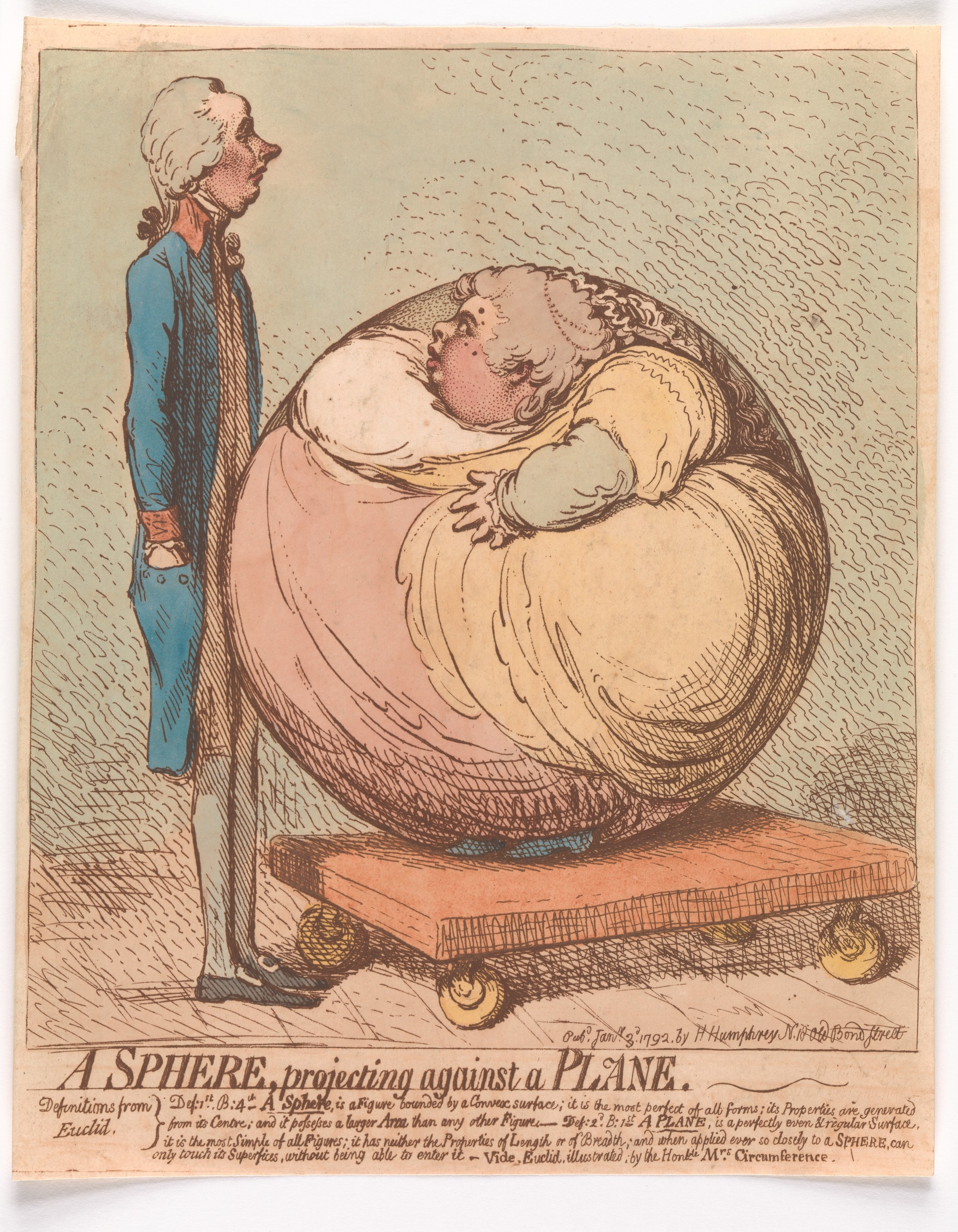
William Pitt the younger and Hobart. Here she is the victim of a 1792 engraving by James Gillray "A sphere, projecting against a plane"

The fashion at the time was for gambling, particularly with the card game faro. She and other celebrities like Charles James Fox and Georgiana Cavendish, Duchess of Devonshire were renowned for their indulgent gambling. The Hobarts were known for this extravagance. Despite not having a licence, she allowed her house to be used for high-stakes gambling. By this device she managed to lose money and to fall foul of the authorities. She was having fun and losing money and so was her husband.

He tried a number of careers with poor results and consoled himself with mistresses. Despite their other interests the couple had four daughters and three sons. Meanwhile the press saw her illegal gambling and indulgent parties as a legitimate target. The commentators at the time could not resist noting the growing size of Albinia and her love of extravagant fashion which was intended more for her daughters.

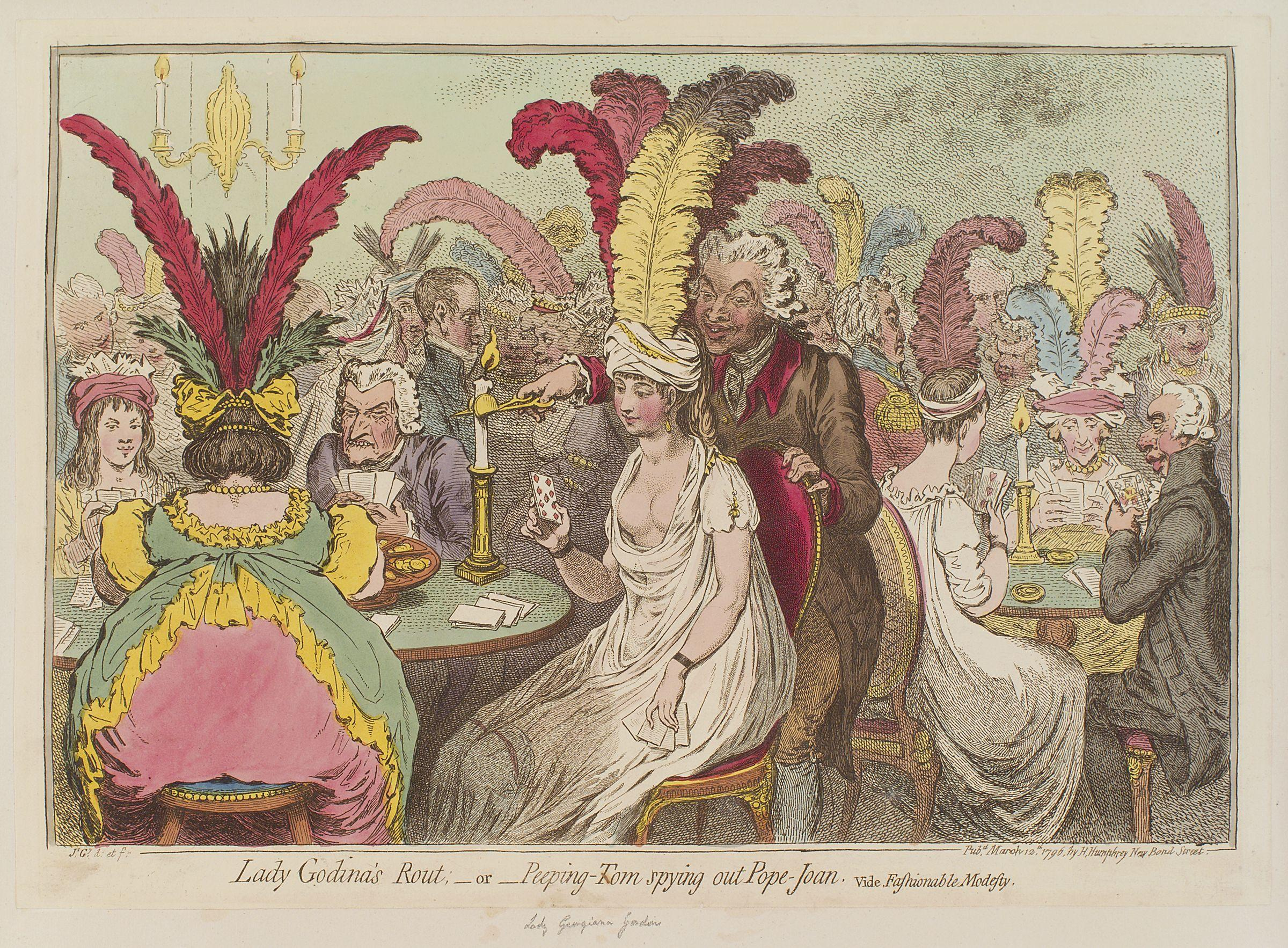
This 1796 caricature by James Gilray shows Albinia from behind at left, next to Lady Georgiana Gordon, later Duchess of Bedford, at the age of 14. The title and the lecherous servant refer to Lady Godiva. Lady "Godina" is holding the diamond nine, called the "Pope" in the game of Pope Joan. The man opposite Albinia is John Sneyd (1763–1835). The rout-party may have been at Albinia's house.

She became a prominent figure of the famous political battle of the general election of 1784 in the Westminster constituency. Charles James Fox's side had the glamorous Georgiana Cavendish, Duchess of Devonshire, accused by her opponents of kissing voters in the street for their pledges, and the other Hobart, the Countess of Buckinghamshire, supporting her relative Sir Cecil Wray, 13th Baronet.

== Personal life ==
Albinia married The Hon. George Hobart in 1757, and so became Countess of Buckinghamshire when he inherited the title in 1793. The Hobarts lived in Hobart House, Ham Common, in Richmond, London, supposedly based on the Frederick the Great's summer palace, Sanssouci. There Albinia organised lavish parties which included performances by her and her daughters. These were attended by high society, including the royal princes. Together, they had eight children:

- Robert Hobart, 4th Earl of Buckinghamshire (1760–1816), who married Margaretta (née Bourke) Adderley, widow of Thomas Adderley and daughter of Edmund Bourke in 1792. After her death in 1796, he married the Hon. Eleanor Eden, daughter of William Eden, 1st Baron Auckland, in 1799.
- Hon. George Vere Hobart (1761–1802), who married first Jane Cataneo and had issue, married second, in April 1802, Janet Maclean and had issue
- Lt. Charles Hobart of the Royal Navy.
- Rev. Hon. Henry Lewis Hobart (1774–1846), who married Charlotte Selina Moore and had issue.
- Lady Albinia Hobart (1759–1850), married Richard Cumberland in 1784 and had issue.
- Lady Henrietta Anne Barbara Hobart (c. 1762–1828), who married, in 1789, John Sullivan and had issue.
- Lady Maria Frances Hobart (c. 1762–1794), who married George North, 3rd Earl of Guilford and had issue.
- Lady Charlotte Hobart (d. 1798), who married Col. Edward Disbrowe (d. 1818) and had issue, including Edward Cromwell Disbrowe.

On her husband's death in 1804, she became the Dowager Countess of Buckinghamshire. She died on 11 March 1816 in Nocton, where she was buried with her husband.
