= John Mercer-Henderson, 8th Earl of Buckinghamshire =

British soldier and politician

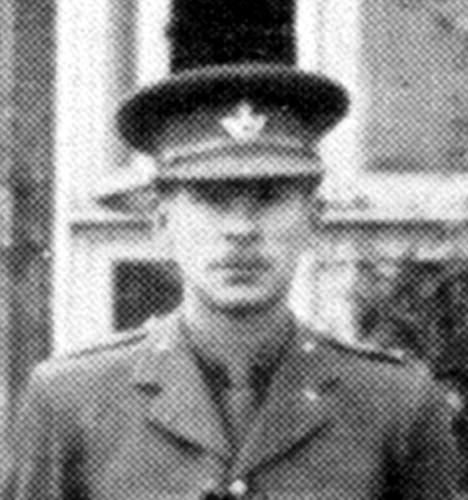
The Earl of Buckinghamshire in 1940.

John Hampden Mercer-Henderson, 8th Earl of Buckinghamshire JP (16 April 1906 – 2 January 1963), styled Lord Hobart until 1930, was a British soldier and politician.

== Background, education and early life ==
Born John Hampden Hobart-Hampden-Mercer-Henderson, Buckinghamshire was the son of Sidney Hobart-Hampden-Mercer-Henderson, 7th Earl of Buckinghamshire and Georgiana Wilhelmina Haldane-Duncan-Mercer-Henderson. He was educated at Eton from September 1919 to March 1924. In his youth, he was regarded as a very handsome and dashing young man, much sought after by his female contemporaries who thought him adorable. However, his Eton contemporary James Lees-Milne later met Bertie on 3 July 1947 and wrote in his diary, ‘He is single, reserved, and rather charming, ugly, with a turned-up nose and moustache.’ (Caves of Ice) Bertie, an adventurous young man, eschewed marriage in favour of exploration and foreign travel. In 1926 he boarded a freighter bound for Australia and worked on farms in the outback as a cowboy herding cattle. But with his father's health worsening he was called back to England. He landed at Hull docks on 21 April 1928 after a six-week voyage from Brisbane via Sydney to Hull. On the Incoming Passenger Register, his occupation was listed as ‘Gentleman Farmer’. He succeeded his father in the earldom in January 1930. On 5 April 1938, his name was legally changed to John Hampden Mercer-Henderson by Royal Licence. Despite his love of the countryside he continued to set hearts racing in society London but much preferred the open spaces to bustling city life. He was on excellent terms with his Hobart cousins; the Baronets of Langdown and often visited his cousins on the Isle of Wight and Hythe in Hampshire.

== Public life ==
Buckinghamshire was a Captain in the Oxfordshire and Buckinghamshire Light Infantry. He served in the Second World War, seeing action against the Japanese in Burma. He also served as a Justice of the Peace for Buckinghamshire in 1952 and was Deputy Chairman of the Committees of the House of Lords between 1952 and 1963. Between 1954 and 1963 he was a Deputy Speaker of the House of Lords. He was a committed Conservative politician in the House of Lords and campaigned passionately on law and order matters to benefit the nation. He was highly regarded by his fellow members of the House who missed his lively speeches on a wide range of socio-political issues. He was a dedicated campaigner on juvenile issues and social justice for the lower classes.

== Personal life ==
Known affectionately to his friends and family as "Bertie Bucks", he was marred by the whiff of a scandal in his youth but the press did not publish the story and the full details of the "scandal", allegedly involving a young woman. He never married and suffered from alcoholism later in life. He died suddenly at King Edward VII's Royal Hospital, St Marylebone in London on 2 January 1963. He is buried at the Hampden Estate in Buckinghamshire, although for the last years of his life he lived at Little Hampden Lodge.

Peerage of Great Britain
Preceded by Sidney Carr Hobart-Hampden-Mercer-Henderson	Earl of Buckinghamshire; 1930–1963	Succeeded by Vere Frederick Cecil Hobart-Hampden
