= Walter Perkins (New Forest MP) =

British politician

Walter Frank Perkins (1865 - 1946) was a Conservative MP.

He won New Forest from the Liberals in January 1910, and was returned unopposed in December 1910.

He was returned unopposed for the new New Forest and Christchurch in 1918, but stood down in 1922.

Parliament of the United Kingdom
Preceded by Sir Robert Hobart, 1st Baronet	Member of Parliament for New Forest; January 1910 – 1918	Constituency abolished
New constituency	Member of Parliament for New Forest and Christchurch; 1918 – 1922	Succeeded by Wilfred Ashley

== Sources ==
- Craig, F.W.S. British parliamentary election results 1885–1918
- Craig, F.W.S. British parliamentary election results 1918–1949
- Whitaker's Almanack, 1911 to 1922 editions
