= Sidney Hobart-Hampden-Mercer-Henderson, 7th Earl of Buckinghamshire =

Sidney Carr Hobart-Hampden-Mercer-Henderson, 7th Earl of Buckinghamshire OBE DL (14 March 1860 – 15 January 1930), styled Lord Hobart from 1875 to 1885, was a British Liberal politician.

== Life ==
Buckinghamshire was the second but only surviving son of Frederick John Hobart-Hampden, Lord Hobart, second son of Reverend Augustus Edward Hobart-Hampden, 6th Earl of Buckinghamshire. His mother was Catherine, daughter of the Right Reverend Thomas Carr, Bishop of Bombay. His father died in 1875 and in 1885 he succeeded his grandfather in the earldom. He sat on the Liberal benches in the House of Lords and served briefly as a Lord-in-waiting (government whip in the House of Lords) from January to June 1895 in the Liberal administration of Lord Rosebery. He was also an Honorary Colonel of the 4th Battalion of the Oxfordshire and Buckinghamshire Light Infantry and served as a Deputy Lieutenant of Buckinghamshire. In 1919 he was appointed an OBE.

=== Family ===
Lord Buckinghamshire married Georgiana Wilhelmina, daughter of the Hon. Hew Adam Dalrymple Hamilton Haldane-Duncan-Mercer-Henderson (son of the 1st Earl of Camperdown) and Edith Isabella Mercer-Henderson, in 1888. They had one son and two daughters; daughter Sidney Farrar emigrated to Kenya and became the first woman elected to the Legislative Council of Kenya. In 1903 Hobart assumed by Royal Licence the additional surnames of Mercer-Henderson for himself and his issue. Buckinghamshire died in January 1930, aged 69, and was succeeded in the earldom by his only son, John. Lady Buckinghamshire died in March 1937, aged 69.

Peerage of the United Kingdom
| Preceded by Augustus Edward Hobart-Hampden | Earl of Buckinghamshire; 1885–1930 | Succeeded by John Hampden Mercer-Henderson |
