= Dean of Wolverhampton =

Head of the chapter of Canons at St Peter's Collegiate Church

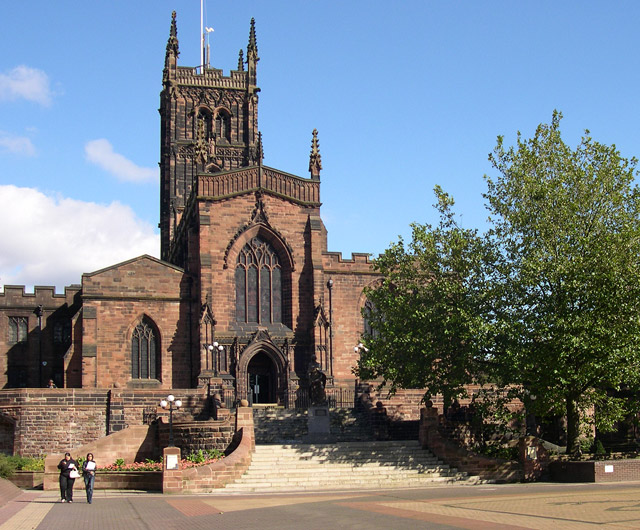
St Peter's, Wolverhampton

The dean of Wolverhampton was the head of the chapter of canons at St Peter's Collegiate Church, Wolverhampton, until the chapter was disestablished in 1846. The collegiate church was, until that point, a royal peculiar falling outside of the diocesan and provincial structures of the Church of England. Today, the church is district church within a team parish led by a rector, although it has its own vicar and curate within the team. It is now part of the Diocese of Lichfield.

== List of deans ==
The deanery was probably established in the mid-12th century, along the lines adopted at Lichfield Cathedral, as the church was in episcopal hands at that time. The names of earlier heads of the chapter and any deans before Peter of Blois have not survived. Samson, William the Conqueror's chaplain was feudal overlord of the canons, but there is no evidence he headed the chapter and he was not ordained priest until he became bishop of Worcester. The following were deans of Wolverhampton before the post became assimilated to the deanery of Windsor, around 1480.

=== High medieval ===
- bef. 1190 Peter of Blois
- 1203 Nicholas
- 1203 Deanery suspended
- 1205 Henry Fitz Geoffrey
- By 1224 Giles of Erdington
- 1269 Theodosius de Camilla
- 1295 Philip of Everdon

=== Late medieval ===
- 1303 John of Everdon
- 1318 Walter de Islip
- 1322 Godfrey of Rudham
- 1326 Robert of Silkstone
- 1328 John of Melbourne
- 1328 John of the Chamber
- 1328 Hugh Ellis
- 1339 Philip Weston
- 1368 John of Newnham
- 1369 Amaury Shirland
- 1373 Richard Postell
- 1394 Lawrence Allerthorpe
- 1406 Thomas Stanley
- 1410 Robert Wolveden
- 1426 William Felter
- 1437 John Barningham
- 1457 William Dudley
- 1477 Lionel Woodville

=== Modern era ===
- 1479 onwards Deanery united to that of Windsor
- 1646–1660 Deanery suspended
- 1846 Deanery abolished (on the death of Henry Hobart)
