= Hobart baronets =

Baronetcy in the Baronetage of the United Kingdom

There have been two baronetcies created for persons with the surname Hobart, one in England and one in the United Kingdom, with both creations for branches of the same family.

The Hobart Baronetcy, of Intwood in the County of Norfolk, was created in the Baronetage of England in 1611 for Sir Henry Hobart. The fifth Baronet was created Earl of Buckinghamshire in 1746. For more information on this creation, see the latter title.

The Hobart Baronetcy, of Langdown in the County of Southampton, was created in the Baronetage of the United Kingdom in 1914 for Sir Robert Henry Hobart, who had previously served as Liberal MP for New Forest from 1906 to 1910. Hobart was the son of the Very Reverend the Hon. Henry Lewis Hobart, fourth son of the third Earl of Buckinghamshire. The present holder is heir presumptive to the earldom of Buckinghamshire and the 1611 baronetcy.

== Hobart baronets, of Intwood (1611) ==
- see the Earl of Buckinghamshire

== Hobart baronets, of Langdown (1914) ==
Escutcheon of the Hobart baronets of Langdown

- Sir Robert Henry Hobart, 1st Baronet (1836–1928)
- Sir Claud Vere Cavendish Hobart, 2nd Baronet (1870–1949)
- Sir Robert Hampden Hobart, 3rd Baronet (1915–1988)
- Sir John Vere Hobart, 4th Baronet (born 1945)

The heir apparent is the present holder's son George Hampden Hobart (born 1982).

Baronetage of England
Preceded by Hoghton baronets	Hobart baronets of Langdown; 22 May 1611	Succeeded by Booth baronets
