= New Forest (constituency) =

Former parliamentary constituency in the United Kingdom

- Former county constituency for the House of Commons
- New Forest in Hampshire, showing boundaries used from 1983–1997
- County: Hampshire
- Major settlements: Ringwood, Brockenhurst, Lyndhurst, Fordingbridge

1950–1997
- Seats: One
- Created from: New Forest and Christchurch
- Replaced by: New Forest West, New Forest East

1885–1918
- Seats: One
- Created from: South Hampshire
- Replaced by: New Forest and Christchurch

New Forest was a county constituency in south-west Hampshire which elected one Member of Parliament (MP) to the House of Commons of the Parliament of the United Kingdom.

It was first created under the Redistribution of Seats Act for the 1885 general election, and was abolished for the 1918 general election, when it was partially replaced by the New Forest and Christchurch constituency.

The seat was re-established for the 1950 general election and was significantly cut in size on the creation of the seat of Romsey in 1983 and was abolished for the 1997 general election, when the New Forest East and New Forest West seats were created using its remaining components.

== Boundaries ==
1885–1918: The Borough of Romsey, the Sessional Divisions of Lymington and Ringwood, part of the Sessional Division of Romsey, and the civil parishes of Chilworth and North Shoreham.

1950–1955: The Borough of Lymington, and the Rural Districts of New Forest, and Ringwood and Fordingbridge.

1955–1974: The Borough of Lymington, the Rural District of Ringwood and Fordingbridge, and part of the Rural District of New Forest.

1974–1983: The Rural Districts of New Forest, and Ringwood and Fordingbridge.

1983–1997: The District of New Forest wards of Barton, Bashley, Becton, Boldre, Bransgore and Sopley, Brockenhurst, Copythorne South, Downlands, Fordingbridge, Forest North, Forest North West, Forest South, Forest West, Hordle, Lymington Town, Lyndhurst, Milford, Milton, Pennington, Ringwood North, Ringwood South, and Sway.

== Members of Parliament ==
=== MPs 1885–1918 ===
| Election | Member | Party |
|---|---|---|
| 1885 | Francis Compton | Conservative |
| 1892 | John Douglas-Scott-Montagu | Conservative |
| 1905 by-election | Henry Francis Compton | Conservative |
| 1906 | Robert Hobart | Liberal |
| Jan 1910 | Walter Frank Perkins | Conservative |
| 1918 | constituency abolished: see New Forest and Christchurch | |

=== MPs 1950–1997 ===
| Event | Member | Party | Notes |
|---|---|---|---|
| 1950 | Oliver Crosthwaite-Eyre | Conservative | Resigned October 1968 |
| 1968 by-election | Patrick McNair-Wilson | Conservative | |
| 1997 | constituency abolished; see New Forest East & New Forest West | | |

== Elections ==
=== Elections in the 1880s ===
General election 1885: New Forest
| Party | Candidate | Votes | % | ±% |
|---|---|---|---|---|
| Conservative | Francis Compton | 4,281 | 54.9 | |
| Liberal | Henry Mason Bompas | 3,511 | 45.1 | |
| Majority | | 770 | 9.8 | |
| Turnout | | 7,792 | 83.3 | |
| Registered electors | | 9,353 | | |
| Conservative win (new seat) | | | | |

General election 1886: New Forest
| Party | Candidate | Votes | % | ±% |
|---|---|---|---|---|
| Conservative | Francis Compton | Unopposed | | |
| Conservative hold | | | | |

=== Elections in the 1890s ===
General election January 1892: New Forest
| Party | Candidate | Votes | % | ±% |
|---|---|---|---|---|
| Conservative | John Douglas-Scott-Montagu | 4,481 | 54.6 | N/A |
| Liberal | Joseph King | 3,726 | 45.4 | New |
| Majority | | 755 | 9.2 | N/A |
| Turnout | | 8,207 | 81.0 | N/A |
| Registered electors | | 10,126 | | |
| Conservative hold | | Swing | N/A | |

General election January 1895: New Forest
| Party | Candidate | Votes | % | ±% |
|---|---|---|---|---|
| Conservative | John Douglas-Scott-Montagu | Unopposed | | |
| Conservative hold | | | | |

=== Elections in the 1900s ===
General election 1900: New Forest
| Party | Candidate | Votes | % | ±% |
|---|---|---|---|---|
| Conservative | John Douglas-Scott-Montagu | Unopposed | | |
| Conservative hold | | | | |

1905 New Forest by-election
| Party | Candidate | Votes | % | ±% |
|---|---|---|---|---|
| Conservative | Henry Francis Compton | 4,539 | 51.1 | N/A |
| Liberal | Robert Hobart | 4,340 | 48.9 | New |
| Majority | | 199 | 2.2 | N/A |
| Turnout | | 8,879 | 82.1 | N/A |
| Registered electors | | 10,818 | | |
| Conservative hold | | Swing | N/A | |

General election January 1906: New Forest
| Party | Candidate | Votes | % | ±% |
|---|---|---|---|---|
| Liberal | Robert Hobart | 4,949 | 50.2 | N/A |
| Conservative | Henry Francis Compton | 4,901 | 49.8 | N/A |
| Majority | | 48 | 0.4 | N/A |
| Turnout | | 9,850 | 89.3 | N/A |
| Registered electors | | 11,030 | | |
| Liberal gain from Conservative | | Swing | N/A | |

=== Elections in the 1910s ===
General election January 1910: New Forest
| Party | Candidate | Votes | % | ±% |
|---|---|---|---|---|
| Conservative | Walter Frank Perkins | 6,516 | 59.6 | +9.8 |
| Liberal | Robert Hobart | 4,423 | 40.4 | −9.8 |
| Majority | | 2,093 | 19.2 | N/A |
| Turnout | | 10,939 | 90.3 | +1.0 |
| Registered electors | | 12,118 | | |
| Conservative gain from Liberal | | Swing | +9.8 | |

General election December 1910: New Forest
| Party | Candidate | Votes | % | ±% |
|---|---|---|---|---|
| Conservative | Walter Frank Perkins | Unopposed | | |
| Conservative hold | | | | |

=== Elections in the 1950s ===
General election 1950: New Forest
| Party | Candidate | Votes | % | ±% |
|---|---|---|---|---|
| Conservative | Oliver Crosthwaite-Eyre | 28,427 | 55.97 | |
| Labour | Aubrey W White | 15,986 | 31.47 | |
| Liberal | Howard Fry | 6,380 | 12.56 | |
| Majority | | 12,441 | 24.50 | |
| Turnout | | 50,793 | 81.58 | |
| Conservative win (new seat) | | | | |

General election 1951: New Forest
| Party | Candidate | Votes | % | ±% |
|---|---|---|---|---|
| Conservative | Oliver Crosthwaite-Eyre | 31,574 | 64.29 | |
| Labour | Aubrey W White | 17,537 | 35.71 | |
| Majority | | 14,037 | 28.58 | |
| Turnout | | 49,111 | 86.30 | |
| Conservative hold | | Swing | | |

General election 1955: New Forest
| Party | Candidate | Votes | % | ±% |
|---|---|---|---|---|
| Conservative | Oliver Crosthwaite-Eyre | 27,027 | 68.75 | |
| Labour | Hallam J Barnes | 12,285 | 31.25 | |
| Majority | | 14,742 | 37.50 | |
| Turnout | | 39,312 | 73.17 | |
| Conservative hold | | Swing | | |

General election 1959: New Forest
| Party | Candidate | Votes | % | ±% |
|---|---|---|---|---|
| Conservative | Oliver Crosthwaite-Eyre | 29,949 | 68.67 | |
| Labour | Bob Mitchell | 13,667 | 31.33 | |
| Majority | | 16,282 | 37.34 | |
| Turnout | | 43,616 | 73.98 | |
| Conservative hold | | Swing | | |

=== Elections in the 1960s ===
General election 1964: New Forest
| Party | Candidate | Votes | % | ±% |
|---|---|---|---|---|
| Conservative | Oliver Crosthwaite-Eyre | 27,884 | 53.31 | |
| Labour | C Bernard Kissen | 12,924 | 24.71 | |
| Liberal | George Nicholas D Locock | 11,497 | 21.98 | New |
| Majority | | 14,960 | 28.60 | |
| Turnout | | 52,305 | 75.84 | |
| Conservative hold | | Swing | | |

General election 1966: New Forest
| Party | Candidate | Votes | % | ±% |
|---|---|---|---|---|
| Conservative | Oliver Crosthwaite-Eyre | 27,292 | 51.20 | |
| Labour | Michael H Jones | 14,260 | 26.75 | |
| Liberal | George Nicholas D Locock | 11,757 | 22.05 | |
| Majority | | 13,032 | 24.45 | |
| Turnout | | 53,309 | 74.16 | |
| Conservative hold | | Swing | | |

1968 New Forest by-election
| Party | Candidate | Votes | % | ±% |
|---|---|---|---|---|
| Conservative | Patrick McNair-Wilson | 28,025 | 66.27 | +15.07 |
| Liberal | George Nicholas D Locock | 8,430 | 19.93 | −2.12 |
| Labour | Alan Reynard | 5,836 | 13.80 | −12.95 |
| Majority | | 19,595 | 46.34 | +21.89 |
| Turnout | | 42,291 | | |
| Conservative hold | | Swing | | |

=== Elections in the 1970s ===
General election 1970: New Forest
| Party | Candidate | Votes | % | ±% |
|---|---|---|---|---|
| Conservative | Patrick McNair-Wilson | 36,041 | 60.13 | |
| Labour | David Malcolm Offenbach | 13,576 | 22.65 | |
| Liberal | Peter Johnson | 10,322 | 17.22 | |
| Majority | | 22,465 | 37.48 | |
| Turnout | | 59,939 | 71.85 | |
| Conservative hold | | Swing | | |

General election February 1974: New Forest
| Party | Candidate | Votes | % | ±% |
|---|---|---|---|---|
| Conservative | Patrick McNair-Wilson | 30,567 | 48.92 | |
| Liberal | A Hayes | 19,185 | 30.70 | |
| Labour | MVC Bailey | 12,737 | 20.38 | |
| Majority | | 11,382 | 18.21 | |
| Turnout | | 62,489 | 80.70 | |
| Conservative hold | | Swing | | |

General election October 1974: New Forest
| Party | Candidate | Votes | % | ±% |
|---|---|---|---|---|
| Conservative | Patrick McNair-Wilson | 28,778 | 49.65 | |
| Liberal | A Hayes | 15,355 | 26.49 | |
| Labour | PJ Brushett | 13,825 | 23.85 | |
| Majority | | 13,423 | 23.16 | |
| Turnout | | 57,958 | 74.20 | |
| Conservative hold | | Swing | | |

General election 1979: New Forest
| Party | Candidate | Votes | % | ±% |
|---|---|---|---|---|
| Conservative | Patrick McNair-Wilson | 39,124 | 59.51 | |
| Liberal | M Kyrle | 13,674 | 20.80 | |
| Labour | Alan Whitehead | 12,950 | 19.70 | |
| Majority | | 25,450 | 38.71 | |
| Turnout | | 65,748 | 77.23 | |
| Conservative hold | | Swing | | |

=== Elections in the 1980s ===
General election 1983: New Forest
| Party | Candidate | Votes | % | ±% |
|---|---|---|---|---|
| Conservative | Patrick McNair-Wilson | 34,157 | 66.37 | |
| Alliance | Robin Harrison | 13,232 | 25.71 | |
| Labour | David James | 4,075 | 7.92 | |
| Majority | | 20,925 | 40.66 | |
| Turnout | | 51,464 | 62.10 | |
| Conservative hold | | Swing | | |

General election 1987: New Forest
| Party | Candidate | Votes | % | ±% |
|---|---|---|---|---|
| Conservative | Patrick McNair-Wilson | 37,188 | 64.67 | |
| Alliance | Roger Karn | 15,456 | 26.88 | |
| Labour | James Hampton | 4,856 | 8.45 | |
| Majority | | 21,732 | 37.79 | |
| Turnout | | 57,500 | 76.58 | |
| Conservative hold | | Swing | | |

=== Elections in the 1990s ===
General election 1992: New Forest
| Party | Candidate | Votes | % | ±% |
|---|---|---|---|---|
| Conservative | Patrick McNair-Wilson | 37,986 | 62.4 | −2.3 |
| Liberal Democrats | Jean K. Vernon-Jackson | 17,581 | 28.9 | +2.0 |
| Labour | Michael J. Shutler | 4,989 | 8.2 | −0.2 |
| Natural Law | Felicity A. Carter | 350 | 0.6 | New |
| Majority | | 20,405 | 33.5 | −4.3 |
| Turnout | | 60,906 | 80.8 | +4.2 |
| Conservative hold | | Swing | −2.1 | |

== See also ==
- List of parliamentary constituencies in Hampshire
