= Earl of Buckinghamshire (1814 ship) =

British ship

History

United Kingdom
- Name: Earl of Buckinghamshire
- Namesake: Earl of Buckinghamshire
- Builder: D. Munn, Montreal
- Launched: 1814
- Fate: Abandoned October 1822

General characteristics
- Tons burthen: 539, or 593, or 594, or 599 (bm)

Earl of Buckinghamshire was built at Montreal in 1814. She sailed to Britain and made two voyages to India. She then started trading between Liverpool and North America. In 1821 she carried some 600 settlers from Greenock to Quebec. Her crew abandoned her in the North Atlantic in October 1822 and she was wrecked in November when she drifted ashore at Galway Bay, Ireland.

== Career ==
Earl of Buckinghamshire first appeared in Lloyd's List (LR) in 1815 with M'Donald, master, Hunter & Co., owner, and trade London–Quebec.

Earl of Buckinghamshire was re-registered at Greenock, Scotland on 2 March 2, 1816 at (Port) No. 12. In 1816 LR showed her master changing from M'Donald to R. Christian, and her trade from Greenock–Montreal to Greenock–Bombay.

The British East India Company (EIC) had lost its monopoly on the trade between Britain and India in 1813, and many shipowners sailed their vessels in the trade. Her owners applied for a licence on 6 March 1816 and received it the same day.

Earl of Buckinghamshire, R. Christian, master, sailed for Bombay on 26 March 1816 under a license from the EIC. She may have made a second voyage in November 1817.

Lloyd's Register for 1819 showed Earl of Buckinghamshire's master changing from R. Christian to T. Johnston and her trade from Liverpool–Bombay to Liverpool–North of Scotland. She had undergone repairs in 1817. B y the next year her owner was Leitch & Co.

Lannark Society settlers to Canada: On 2 May 1821 Earl of Buckinghamshire ran aground at Bray Head, Ireland, during a fog. She was carrying almost 600 passengers from Greenock to Quebec. The officers of the Customs and the Preventative Service assisted in getting her off on the next tide. (Note: The "Lanark Society settlers" were a group of settlers that travelled to Upper Canada [Ontario] under an emigration scheme in 1820 and 1821. At the time there were some 44 or 45 emigration societies. These societies drew on government subsidies to fund their members' passage to Canada.)

There exists a diagram of her berthing arrangements that describes Earl of Buckinghamshire having 72 four-person berths, 32 three-person berths, and eight 2-person berths, for a total of 400 passengers, or two passengers per three tons of burthen. An extract from an earlier edition of a book provides detailed information on the provisions on Earl of Buckinghamshire for the settlers, and some incidents from the voyage.

Earl of Buckinghamshire, Johnson, master, arrived at the port of Quebec on 16 June with 606 passengers. She had taken 48 days to arrive from Greenock.

== Fate ==
On 6 October 1822 Earl of Buckinghamshire was sailing from Quebec for Greenock when a tremendous gale wrecked her and washed two crewmen overboard. The survivors remained on board until 14 October when Mary, of Workington, which had been sailing from Richibucto (Liverpool, New Brunswick), rescued the 22 surviving passengers and 22 surviving crews. Mary delivered them on 19 October to Cork. Although there was a report that Earl of Buckinghamshire had arrived in the Clyde, on 5 November the abandoned ship drifted on shore at Galway Bay and went to pieces.
