= George Rawson =

English 19th-century hymn writer

George Rawson (1807—1889) was an English hymn writer and Congregationalist lay person, who was born in Leeds on 5 June 1807 and died in Clifton, Bristol on 25 March 1889. He qualified as a lawyer and practised law in Leeds, but also lived in Bristol.

Rawson devoted his leisure time to writing and collating hymns. He worked with the Congregational ministers of Leeds to compile a collection of Psalms, Hymns, and Passages of Scripture for Christian Worship commonly known as the 'Leeds Hymn-book'. He also compiled Psalms and Hymns for the Use of the Baptist Denomination in conjunction with Baptist denominational leaders. His hymn collections include Hymns, Verses, and Chants and Songs of Spiritual Thought, published by the Religious Tract Society in 1885. He wrote or reworded a large number of hymns, including 'With Gladness we Worship'. A review of Songs of Spiritual Thought published in The Congregationalist stated: "There are few who have contributed hymns of such exquisite beauty and such rare sweetness as are to be found in this collection."

Following his death in 1889 he was buried in Arnos Vale Cemetery, Bristol.
