= Richard Postell =

English church official in the 14th century

Richard Postell (died 1400) was a Canon of Windsor from 1373 to 1400 and Dean of Wolverhampton.

== Career ==
He was appointed:

- Rector of Bradfield 1361
- Rector of Harlington 1365
- Rector of Narberth (Diocese of St Davids) 1372
- Dean of Wolverhampton 1373 - 1394

He was appointed to the tenth stall in St George's Chapel, Windsor Castle in 1373 and held the canonry until 1400.
