= Henry Francis Compton =

British politician (1872–1943)

Henry Francis Compton (16 January 1872 – 11 April 1943) was a British Conservative politician. He was elected Member of Parliament (MP) for New Forest at a by-election in 1905, but only weeks later lost the seat to the Liberals at the 1906 general election.

== Early life ==
Compton was born in 1872, the son of Henry Compton and Harriet Granville, of Minstead Manor House, Hampshire. He served as a Magistrate and as an officer in the 4th Volunteer Battalion Hampshire Regiment. His grandfather and uncle had also been Members of Parliament, the latter sitting for the New Forest Constituency between 1885 and 1892.

== Member of Parliament ==
Compton was selected as Conservative candidate in succession to the sitting MP John Douglas-Scott-Montagu, who had succeeded to the Peerage as Baron Montagu of Beaulieu. There had not been a contested election in the seat since 1892, but the Liberals fielded Sir Robert Hobart.

After a closely fought contest, Compton was elected on 6 December 1905 with a majority of 199 votes. However, the Conservative government had collapsed the previous day, and the new prime minister Campbell-Bannerman would soon call a general election. As Parliament was not sitting at the time, Compton was unable to take his seat.

The following month, Henry Compton was defeated by Sir Robert Hobart by just 48 votes, thus becoming, after 46 days, the shortest-serving Member of Parliament whose tenure was not ended by death, and one of only a handful never to take their seats.

Compton later served as Official Verderer of the New Forest. He died at Lyndhurst, Hampshire in 1943, aged 71.

== See also ==
- List of United Kingdom MPs with the shortest service

== Bibliography ==
- Leigh Rayment's Historical List of MPs

Parliament of the United Kingdom
| Preceded by John Douglas-Scott-Montagu | Member of Parliament for New Forest; 1905 – 1906 | Succeeded by Sir Robert Hobart |
