= George Hobart-Hampden, 5th Earl of Buckinghamshire =

British peer and politician

The Right Honourable The Earl of Buckinghamshire

Member of Parliament for Mitchell
- In office 1812–1813 Serving with John Bruce
- Preceded by: Sir James Hall, Bt; John Bruce
- Succeeded by: John Bruce; Hon. Edward Law

Personal details
- Born: George Robert Hobart; 1 May 1789
- Died: 1 February 1849 (aged 59)
- Spouse: Anne Pigot (m. 1819; died 1849)
- Relations: George Hobart, 3rd Earl of Buckinghamshire (grandfather)
- Parent(s): Hon. George Vere Hobart; Jane Cattaneo
- Education: Westminster School
- Alma mater: Christ Church, Oxford

George Robert Hobart-Hampden, 5th Earl of Buckinghamshire (1 May 1789 – 1 February 1849), known as George Hobart until 1816, was a British peer and politician.

== Early life ==
Buckinghamshire was the son of the Hon. George Vere Hobart, second son of George Hobart, 3rd Earl of Buckinghamshire. His mother was Jane Cattaneo, daughter of Horatio Cattaneo, while Robert Hobart, 4th Earl of Buckinghamshire, was his uncle.

He was educated at Westminster School in London from 1803 to 1807, Christ Church, Oxford in 1809, and at Lincoln's Inn in 1810.

== Career ==
Lord Buckinghamshire sat briefly as Member of Parliament for Mitchell (also known as the St Michaels constituency) from 1812 to 1813. In 1813, he served as Capt. of the Stamford Regiment Lincolnshire Militia.

In 1816 he succeeded his uncle in the earldom and entered the House of Lords. He also became the 9th Baronet Hobart and 5th Baron Hobart. In 1824 he assumed, by Royal licence, the additional surname of Hampden to inherit the Buckinghamshire estates of his kinsman, John Hampden-Trevor, 3rd Viscount Hampden.

== Personal life ==
On 3 May 1819, Lord Buckinghamshire married Anne Glover Pigot, an illegitimate daughter of Sir Arthur Piggott, at St Giles in the Fields Church in London. They had no children.

He died in February 1849, aged 59, and was succeeded by his younger brother, the Reverend Augustus Edward Hobart-Hampden. Lady Buckinghamshire later remarried and died in May 1878.

Parliament of the United Kingdom
Preceded by Sir James Hall, Bt; John Bruce	Member of Parliament for Mitchell; 1812–1813; With: John Bruce	Succeeded by John Bruce; Hon. Edward Law
Peerage of Great Britain
Preceded by Robert Hobart	Earl of Buckinghamshire; 1816–1849	Succeeded by Augustus Edward Hobart-Hampden
