= Sir Robert Hobart, 1st Baronet =

British politician (1836–1928)

Sir Robert Henry Hobart Bt KCVO CB

Member of Parliament for New Forest
- In office 1906–1910
- Preceded by: Henry Francis Compton
- Succeeded by: Walter Perkins

Personal details
- Born: 13 September 1836
- Died: 4 August 1928 (aged 91)
- Party: Liberal
- Spouse: Hon. Julia Trollope (m. 1869)
- Parents: Hon. Henry Lewis Hobart (father); Charlotte Selina Moore (mother)
- Relatives: George Hobart (paternal grandfather)

Sir Robert Henry Hobart, 1st Baronet, KCVO, CB (13 September 1836 – 4 August 1928) was a British Liberal Party politician.

== Biography ==
Hobart was the oldest son of Hon. Henry Lewis Hobart, third son of the 3rd Earl of Buckinghamshire, and Charlotte Selina Moore, daughter of Richard Moore. He was a civil servant in the War Office between 1860 and 1900, and was appointed a Companion of the Order of the Bath (CB) in 1885. In October 1901 the Earl Marshal, the Duke of Norfolk, appointed him a Secretary to the Earl Marshal's office, to work on preparations for the 1902 coronation of King Edward VII. He received the King Edward VII Coronation Medal, and on 11 August 1902 (two days after the coronation) was knighted as a Knight Commander of the Royal Victorian Order (KCVO) for his services.

Hobart was the Official Verderer of the New Forest and sat as Member of Parliament (MP) for New Forest from 1906 until 1910.

On 14 July 1914, he was created a Baronet, of Langdown, in the County of Southampton.

=== Election results ===
1905 New Forest by-election Electorate 10,818
Party	Candidate	Votes	%	±%
Conservative	Henry Francis Compton	4,539	51.1	n/a
Liberal	Sir Robert Henry Hobart	4,340	48.9	n/a
Turnout		8,879	82.1	n/a
Majority		199	2.2	n/a
Conservative hold		Swing	n/a	

General election January 1906 Electorate 11,030
Party	Candidate	Votes	%	±%
Liberal	Sir Robert Henry Hobart	4,949	50.2	+1.3
Conservative	Henry Francis Compton	4,901	49.8	−1.3
Turnout		9,850	89.3	+7.2
Majority		48	0.4	2.6
Liberal gain from Conservative		Swing	+1.3	

== Family ==
On 13 May 1869, Hobart married Hon. Julia Trollope, oldest daughter of the 1st Baron Kesteven. He died in August 1928 aged 91 and was succeeded in the baronetcy by his only son Claud.

Parliament of the United Kingdom
Preceded by Henry Francis Compton	Member of Parliament for New Forest; 1906 – January 1910	Succeeded by Walter Perkins
Baronetage of Great Britain
New creation	Baronet (of Langdown); 1914–1928	Succeeded by Claud Vere Cavendish Hobart
