= George Hobart-Hampden, 10th Earl of Buckinghamshire =

British peer (born 1944)

George Miles Hobart-Hampden, 10th Earl of Buckinghamshire (born 15 December 1944) is a British peer and businessman.

== Early life ==
The son of Cyril Langel Hobart-Hampden and his wife Margaret Jolliffe, he was educated at Clifton College and the University of Exeter, where he graduated with a BA in 1967, and then at Birkbeck College, London, and the Institute of Commonwealth Studies, where he took a MA in 1968.

== Career ==
From 1970 to 1981 he was with Noble Lowndes and partners and between 1981 and 1991 was a director of various companies within the Hong Kong Banking Group. In 1995 he was a partner in Watson Wyatt Worldwide.

On 19 April 1983 Hobart-Hampden inherited from a cousin the peerages of Earl of Buckinghamshire (1746) and Baron Hobart of Blickling (1728) and the Hobart baronetcy (1611).

He sat as a Conservative in the House of Lords from 1984 until the House of Lords Act 1999 came into force.

== Personal life ==
On 27 July 1968 he married firstly Susan Jennifer Adams, a daughter of Raymond W. Adams. They divorced in 1975, and he married secondly Alison Wightman Forrest, daughter of William Forrest.

== Honours ==
- Fellow of the Institute of Directors, 1983
