= Great and Little Hampden =

Civil parish in Buckinghamshire, England

Coordinates: 51.7062°N 0.7780°W

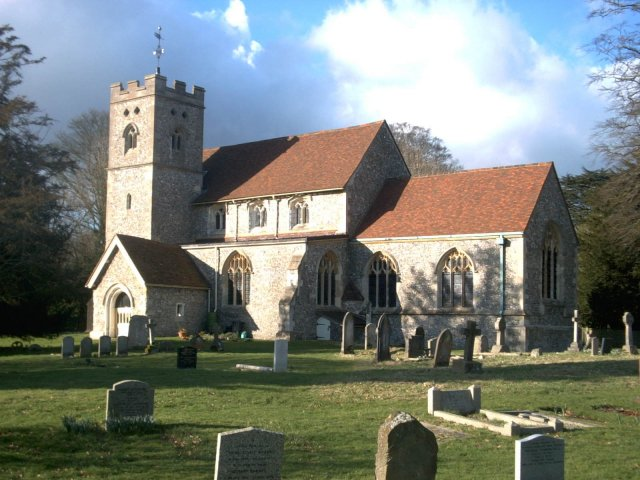
- Great Hampden Church

- Location within Buckinghamshire
- Population: 259 (2001 Census); 300 (2011 Census)
- OS grid reference: SP845015
- Unitary authority: Buckinghamshire
- Ceremonial county: Buckinghamshire
- Region: South East
- Country: England
- Sovereign state: United Kingdom
- Post town: GREAT MISSENDEN
- Postcode district: HP16
- Dialling code: 01494
- Police: Thames Valley
- Fire: Buckinghamshire
- Ambulance: South Central
- UK Parliament: Mid Buckinghamshire

Great and Little Hampden is a civil parish in Buckinghamshire, England, about three miles south-east of Princes Risborough. It incorporates the villages of Great Hampden and Little Hampden, and the hamlets of Green Hailey and Hampden Row. Great Hampden is the ancestral home of the Hobart-Hampden family, the most famous of whom was the English Civil War protagonist John Hampden.

== History ==
The villages were first mentioned in the Domesday Book of 1086, when they were jointly called Hamdena after the owners of the local manor.

By the 14th century 'Hamdena' was split into the two villages, Great Hampden at the top of one hill and Little Hampden on the next hill, with the lush arable land forming the rest of the two parishes spread out in the valley between them. It was also at about this time that Hampden House, the house belonging to the Hobart-Hampden family was rebuilt.

After the death of John Hampden, a cross was erected just above the lane that leads from Hampden House to the nearby village of Prestwood. Where the cross stands is reputed to be the spot where John Hampden stood when he first refused to pay the Ship Money tax in 1636. However the nearby village of Great Kimble also claims to be the place where he refused to pay the tax. From the cross there is a view of the Chiltern Hills.

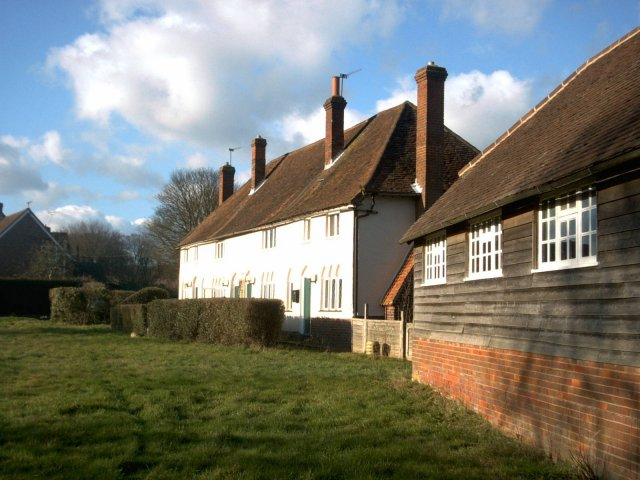
Cottages in Great Hampden

Hampden himself is buried at the church in Great Hampden, in an unmarked grave. His first wife had a stone tablet in her honour erected in the chancel. In the 19th century the floor below this tablet was lifted and a body exhumed which was missing its hand and had had its shoulder dislocated. Due to the nature of Hampden's death at the Battle of Chalgrove Field near Thame (he died as a result of an injury to his arm and shoulder) this was assumed to be the body of Hampden himself; however this assumption has since been challenged by other historians.

Great Hampden church stands a mile or so from the village. Its isolation made it an attractive location for some scenes in the 1970 film Cromwell. In more modern times Hampden House was used extensively by the Hammer film studios as the perfect gothic backdrop for many of their films.

The nave of Little Hampden Church was built in the 13th Century and a distinctive half timbered porch was added in the 15th century. There are 13th century wall paintings of saints inside that were discovered in 1907, however they are incomplete due to a major rebuild of the chancel in 1859. Opposite the church is Manor Farm which is white plastered.

== See also ==
- Hampden, Massachusetts

== Gallery ==
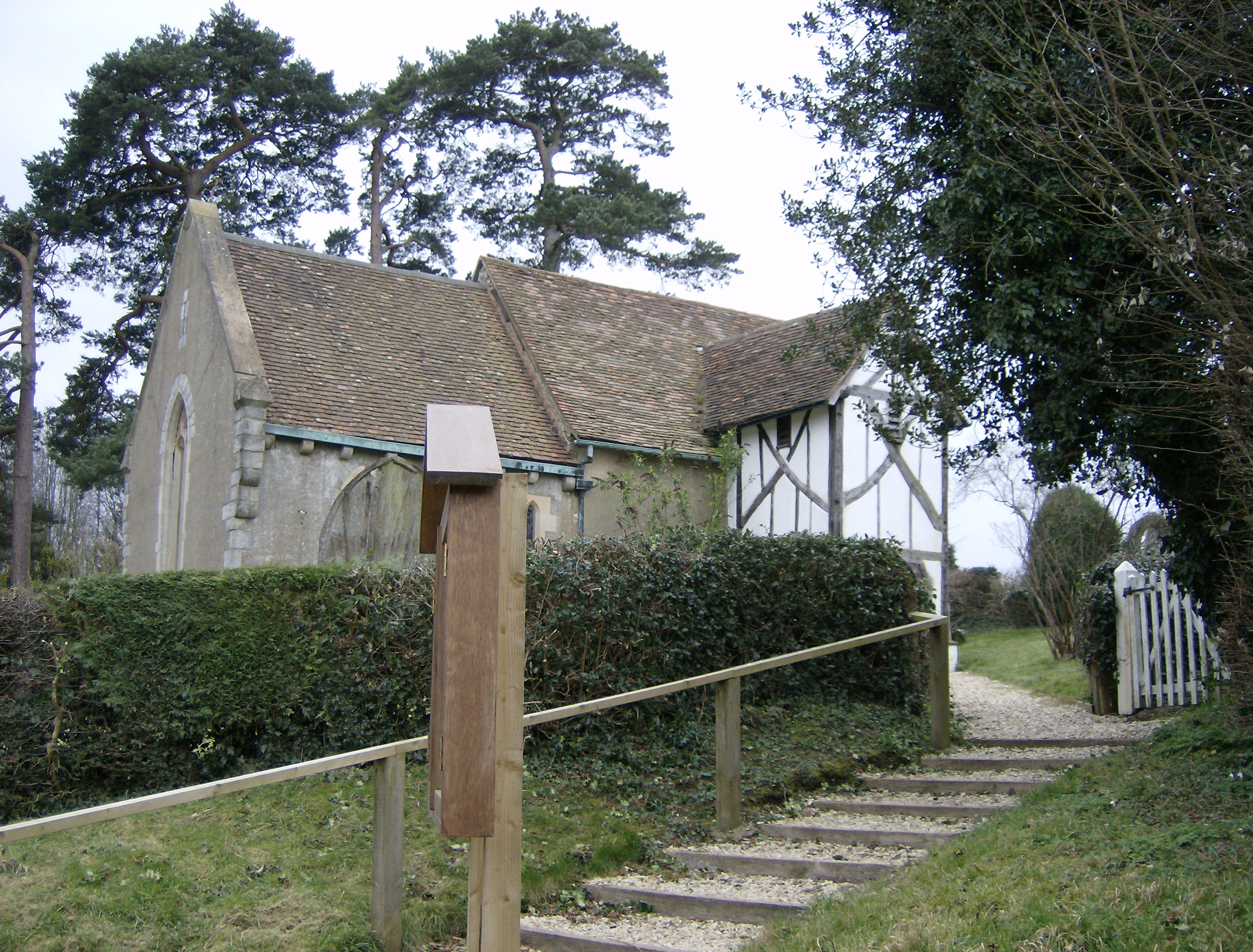
Little Hampden Church
