= Henry Hobart (priest) =

English Anglican priest

Hon. Henry Lewis Hobart (bapt. 9 February 1774 – 8 May 1846) was an English Anglican priest who became Dean of Windsor and thus Dean of Wolverhampton.

== Background and education ==
Henry Hobart's was born in Nocton, Lincolnshire, the son of George Hobart, 3rd Earl of Buckinghamshire, a fairly unenthusiastic Member of the British House of Commons, initially as a Grenville Whig, from 1754 until 1780 and briefly secretary to the British embassy in Saint Petersburg. He succeeded his half-brother as Earl of Buckinghamshire in 1793.

Henry Hobart's mother was Albinia Bertie, daughter of Lord Vere Bertie (died 1768), younger son of Robert Bertie, 1st Duke of Ancaster and Kesteven.

Hobart was the youngest of eight surviving children. He was born early in 1774 and baptised on 9 February in the parish church at Nocton. He was educated at Westminster School and at Christ's College, Cambridge, which he entered in 1793. He graduated as MA in 1797. He was to become a Doctor of Divinity in 1816.

== Ecclesiastical career ==
Hobart was ordained deacon at Winchester in June 1797 and priest in February 1798. As the son of an earl he had many avenues of preferment open to him, largely exploiting family and political connections. He was to obtain numerous positions and benefices, many of them held in plurality in places far apart, a practice that was not significantly restricted until the Pluralities Act 1850. By this process he could acquire a relatively large income. He was not required to prove his worth as a curate but went straight into remunerative and responsible positions.

Almost as soon as he was ordained to the priesthood, Hobart became rector of Chipping Warden in Northamptonshire. In 1801, he became rector also of the nearby parish of Edgcote. Both of these rectories he held until 1815, being appointed prebendary of Canterbury Cathedral in 1804, a post he held until 1816. In 1815, he was appointed to three lucrative livings in one year: Vicar of Nocton, a parish in the gift of his family; Rector of St Dionis Backchurch in the City of London, a post he held until 1828; and Rector of Great Haseley, Oxfordshire.

In 1816, Hobart reached the pinnacle of his success as a clergyman with his appointment as Dean of Windsor. This made him spiritual head of St George's Chapel, Windsor Castle, a chapel royal and royal peculiar, essentially the monarch's private chapel. He was to hold this deanery until his death in 1848, serving four monarchs: George III, George IV, William IV and Queen Victoria. The deanery carried with it the post of Register of the Order of the Garter, which is based at the chapel. As dean, Hobart had the ear of the monarch. However, he seems not to have built up any great influence. This may be due to a certain insensitivity or lack of tact. When Victoria gave birth to the future Edward VII in November 1841, Hobart congratulated her on "thus saving us from the incredible curse of a female succession." Even after his appointment at Windsor, Hobart acquired more livings. From 1823 to 1842 he was vicar of Fulmer, Buckinghamshire, and from 1828 he was Vicar of Wantage, then in Berkshire.

By a custom dating to the late 15th century, the Deanery of Windsor brought with it the Deanery of Wolverhampton, another royal peculiar, outside the supervision of the local Diocese of Lichfield. St Peter's Collegiate Church was the centre of a large parish, extending far into the Black Country and rural Staffordshire. However, the deanery and prebends were virtual sinecures, as the parish had long been used to absentee clergy and the work was done by poorly paid curates. The deanery lands brought Hobart £600 a year, mainly because of the mineral wealth underlying them. However, public opinion was changing and the 1830s brought a series of reforming governments. The Wolverhampton deanery became synonymous with clerical corruption and negligence: the small spiritual contribution of the clergy was contrasted with the revenues they took out. The quarrelsome behaviour of Dr. Oliver, Hobart's Perpetual Curate in the parish, further alienated opinion. In 1836 the Ecclesiastical Commission was established, charged with reviewing and redistributing Church of England revenues. This soon produced a plan of reform, embodied in legislation, variously termed the Cathedrals Act 1840 and the Ecclesiastical Commissioners Act 1840, but actually entitled An Act to carry into effect, with certain Modifications, the Fourth Report of the Commissioners of Ecclesiastical Duties and Revenues. Section 21 decreed that the deanery should be suppressed, along with those of Middleham, Heytesbury and Brecon. Section 51 restricted the rights of any appointees to positions within the colleges but allowed Hobart and the other deans to continue in office until their deaths. The prebends were left vacant in readiness and, on Hobart's death in 1846, the deanery was abolished, followed two years later by the college itself.

== Marriage and family ==
On 5 October 1824, Hobart married Charlotte Selina Moore, daughter of Richard Moore, a Chelsea landowner who resided in an apartment at Hampton Court Palace. They had at least seven children. Their eldest son was Robert Hobart (1836–1928), a Liberal MP from 1906 to 1910, created a baronet in 1914.
