= Hubert =

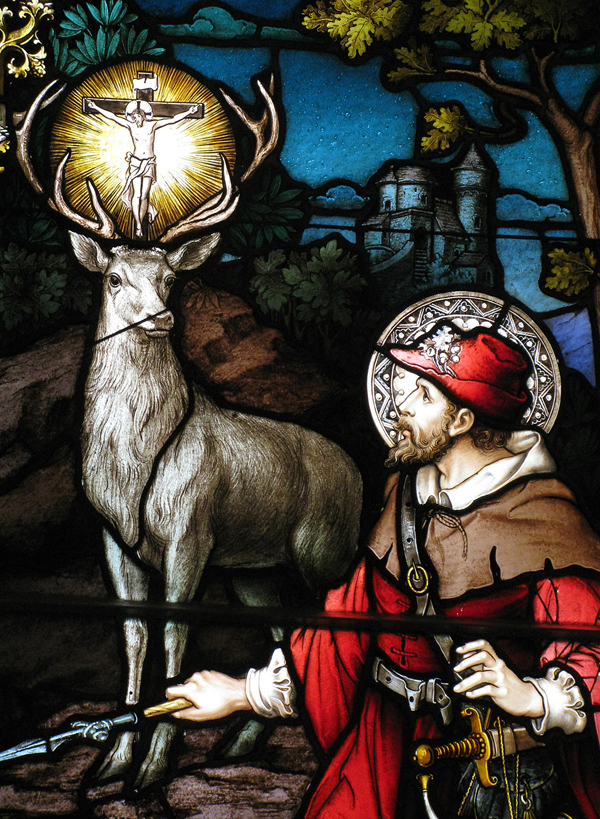
- Saint Hubert of Liège
- Gender: male

Origin
- Origin: Germanic
- Meaning: "mind-bright"

Other names
- Related names: Hugubert, Hughbert, Hugo, Hubrecht, Hugubrecht, Hubertus, Hudson, Hugh, Huub

Hubert is a Germanic masculine given name, from hug "mind" and beraht "bright". It also occurs as a surname.

Saint Hubert of Liège (or Hubertus) (c. 656 – 30 May 727) is the patron saint of hunters, mathematicians, opticians, and metalworkers.

== People with the given name Hubert ==
This is a small selection of articles on people named Hubert; for a comprehensive list see instead.

- Hubert Aaronson (1924–2005), F. Mehl University Professor at Carnegie Mellon University
- Hubert Adair (1917–1940), World War II Royal Air Force pilot
- Hubert Auriol (1952–2021), French professional off-road motorcyclist and auto racer
- Hubert Austin (1841–1915), English architect
- Hubert Badanai (1895–1986), Canadian automobile dealer and politician
- Hubert Bath (1883–1945), English film composer, music director, and conductor
- Hubert Beckers (1806–1889), German philosopher
- Hubert Boulard, a French comics creator who is unusually credited as "Hubert"
- Hubert Brasier (1917–1981), a Church of England clergyman, more famously the father of UK Prime Minister Theresa May
- Hubert Brown (disambiguation), several people
- Hubert Buchanan (born 1941), United States Air Force captain and fighter pilot
- Hubert Burton, English actor
- Hubert Butler (1900–1991), Irish essayist
- Hubert Chapman (1910–1972), senior Royal Air Force (RAF) officer
- Hubert Chevis (1902–1931), a lieutenant in the Royal Artillery of the British Army who died of strychnine poisoning in June 1931
- Hubert B. Crouch (1906–1980), American zoologist
- Hubert Davies, British playwright and director
- Hubert Davis (disambiguation), several people
- Hubert Desbiens (1931–2009), Canadian politician
- Hubert Dreyfus (1929–2017), American philosopher
- Hubert, Duke of Spoleto (died c.969), illegitimate son of King Hugh of Italy
- Hubert A. Eaton (1916–1991), American physician, civil rights activist, and tennis player
- Hubert Eaton (1881–1966), American businessman
- Hubert van Eyck (c.1385–1426), Early Dutch painter
- Hubert Fattal (1970–2022), Lebanese businessman
- Hubert Fichte (1935–1986), German novelist
- Hubert Gallant (born 1955), Canadian former professional wrestler
- Hubert Geralds (born 1964), American fugitive
- Hubert de Givenchy (1921–2018), French fashion designer who founded the house of Givenchy in 1952
- Hubert von Goisern (born 1952), Austrian musician
- Hubert Gough (1870–1963), senior officer in the British Army and commander of British Fifth Army in the First World War
- Hubert von Herkomer (1849–1914), German-born British painter, film-director and composer
- Hubert Humphrey (1911–1978), American politician, Vice President of the United States
- Hubert Hunt (1898–1981), British World War I flying ace
- Hubert Hurkacz (born 1997), Polish tennis player
- Hubert Hüppe (born 1956), German politician
- Hubert Ingraham (born 1947), Prime Minister of the Bahamas
- Hubert Kemmler, leader of the German band Hubert Kah
- Hubert Lampo (1920–2006), Flemish writer
- Hubert Lanz (1896–1982), German general
- Hubert Laws (born 1939), American flutist and saxophonist
- Hubert Lenoir (born 1994), French Canadian, singer, musician
- Hubert Loutsch (1878–1946), Prime Minister of Luxembourg
- Hubert von Luschka (1820–1875), German anatomist
- Hubert Lyautey (1854–1934), French general
- Hubert Lynes (1874–1942), British admiral
- Hubert Maga (1916–2000), President of Dahomey
- Hubert Lester Michael Jr., American convicted murderer
- Hubert Miller (1918–2000), American bobsledder
- Hubertus van Mook (1894–1965), Governor-General of the Dutch East Indies, one of the principal commanders of Indonesian National Revolution
- Hubert Nelson, multiple people
- Hubert Parker (disambiguation)
- Hubert Pierlot (1883–1963), Belgian Prime Minister
- Hubert Pilčík (1891–1951), Czechoslovak serial killer
- Hubert Raudaschl (1942–2025), Austrian sailor and sailboat manufacturer
- Hubert Reynolds (1860–1938), American politician
- Hubert Robert (1733–1808), French landscape painter
- Hubert Roberts (born 1961), American-Israeli basketball player
- Hubert Schumacher (born 1960), President of the Cantonal Council of Obwalden, Switzerland
- Hubert Skrzypczak (1943–2025), Polish boxer
- Hubert Strolz (born 1962), Austrian alpine skier
- Hubert Sumlin (1931–2011), American blues guitarist and singer
- Hubert Trzybinski (born 1991), German rower
- Hubert Van Innis (1868–1961), Belgian archer
- Hubert Walter (c. 1160–1205) Archbishop of Canterbury and Lord Chancellor of England
- Hubert Walter (1930–2008), German anthropologist
- Hubert Blaine Wolfeschlegelsteinhausenbergerdorff Sr., a man with the longest last name in recorded history
- Hubert W. Woodruff (1923–2019), American lawyer and politician
- Hubert Weber (judge) (born 1939), Austrian judge
- Hubert Weber (politician) (1929–2017), German lawyer and politician
- Hubert Wilson (disambiguation), several people
- Hubert Winthrop Young (1885–1950), English soldier
- Hubert Wu (born 1990), Hong Kong singer-songwriter and actor
- Hubert Wulfranc (born 1956), French politician
- Hubert Young (cricketer) (born 1911), Jamaican cricketer
- Hubert Zafke (1920–2018), Nazi S.S. medic

=== Fictional characters ===
- Hubert, the titular pig in the French animated comedy series Hubert & Takako
- Hubert, Lutz's valet in the operetta The Student Prince
- King Hubert, a character from the 1959 Disney film Sleeping Beauty
- Hubert Ambrewster, a character on the TV sitcom The Ropers
- Sir Hubert Blunt, a character in the 1980s animated television series Dragon's Lair
- Hubert Cumberdale, a character from David Firth's Salad Fingers
- Huey Duck, full name Hubert Duck
- Professor Hubert J. Farnsworth, a professor from the animated sitcom Futurama
- Lieutenant Hubert Gruber, a character in the BBC sitcom 'Allo 'Allo!
- Hubert Oswell, a character from the video game Tales of Graces
- Hubert von Vestra, a character from the video game Fire Emblem: Three Houses and Fire Emblem Warriors: Three Hopes

== People with the surname Hubert ==
- Allison Hubert (1901–1978), American football player
- Andy Hubert (born 1990), German footballer
- Anthoine Hubert (1996–2019), French racing driver
- David Hubert (born 1988), Belgian footballer
- Étienne Hubert (disambiguation), several people
- Guillaume Hubert (born 1994), Belgian footballer
- Guy Hubert (born 1979), Malagasy footballer
- Henri Hubert (1872–1927), French archaeologist and sociologist
- Janet Hubert (born 1956), American film and television actress
- Konrad Hubert (1507–1577), German Reformed theologian
- Laëtitia Hubert (born 1974), French figure skater
- Louis Hubert (born 2007), French para-cyclist
- Nicolas Hubert (died 1569), French servant involved in the murder of Lord Darnley
- Owen Hubert (born 2000), Canadian-American football player
- Tom Hubert (born 1964), American road course racer
- Wyatt Hubert (born 1998), American football player

== Variations ==
- Hobart (given name) and Hobart (surname) (English)
- Hub (Dutch, e.g., Hub van Doorne)
- Hubbert (surname)
- Hubertas (Lithuanian, e.g. Hubertas Grušnys)
- Huberto (Spanish)
- Hubertus (Dutch, German, Latin)
- Hubrecht (Dutch)
- Huib, Huibert, Huibrecht, Huijbrecht (Dutch)
- Hupert (surname)
- Huppert (given name and surname)
- Hupperts (surname)
- Huppertz (surname)
- Huprecht (German)
- Huub, Huybert, Huybrecht (Dutch)
- Uberto (Italian)
- Uberti (Italian)

== Popularity ==
In England and Wales, Hubert was the 65th most commonly given male name in 1904, 71st in 1914 and 87th in 1924. By 1934 it had dropped out of the Top 100.

== See also ==
- Heber, Anglicisation of the Irish Gaelic given name Éibhear
- Hebert, a Germanic given name
- Hibbert, given name derived from Hildebert
- Huber, German occupational surname
