= Forest Lawn =

Forest Lawn may refer to:

== Cemeteries in the United States ==
=== California ===
- Forest Lawn Memorial-Parks & Mortuaries, a chain of cemeteries in southern California
- Forest Lawn Cemetery (Cathedral City), California
- Forest Lawn Memorial Park (Glendale), California
- Forest Lawn Memorial Park (Hollywood Hills), California
- Forest Lawn Memorial Park (Long Beach), California

=== Elsewhere ===
- Forest Lawn Memorial Gardens, South (Plantation, Florida)
- Forest Lawn Memorial Park (Erlanger, Kentucky)
- Forest Lawn Memorial Park (Omaha), Nebraska
- Forest Lawn Cemetery (Buffalo), New York
- Forest Lawn Memorial Gardens, Goodlettsville, Tennessee
- Forest Lawn Memorial Park (Beaumont), Texas
- Forest Lawn Cemetery (Richmond, Virginia)

== Other places ==
- Forest Lawn Memorial Park (Burnaby), British Columbia, Canada
- Forest Lawn, Calgary, a former Canadian town annexed by Calgary in 1961
  - Calgary Forest Lawn, a federal electoral district
- Forest Lawn neighborhood in northwestern Webster, New York
- Forest Lawn Scout Reservation, a group of Boy Scout camps in Cedar Glen, California, see Los Angeles Area Council: Camps
