= Drion =

Drion may refer to:

- Huib Drion (1917-2004), Dutch Supreme Court judge
- Maximilien Drion (born 1997), Belgian ski mountaineer
- Drion's pill, hypothetical suicide tablet
