= Hobart Township =

Hobart Township may refer to the following places in the United States:

- Hobart Township, Lake County, Indiana
- Hobart Township, Otter Tail County, Minnesota
- Hobart Township, Barnes County, North Dakota

== See also ==
- Hobart (disambiguation)
