= Hobart (disambiguation) =

Hobart is the capital of Tasmania, Australia.

Hobart may also refer to:

== Places ==
=== Australia ===
- Electoral division of Hobart, Tasmania, Australia
- Electoral district of Hobart, Tasmania, a former electoral district
- City of Hobart, Tasmania
- Hobart Rivulet, Tasmania
- Roman Catholic Archdiocese of Hobart, Tasmania
- Hobart railway station, Hobart, Tasmania, a former station

=== United States ===
- Berlin, Alabama, known as Hobart in the late 19th century
- Hobart, Indiana, a city
  - Hobart station (Indiana), a train station
- Hobart Township, Lake County, Indiana
- Hobart, Louisiana, an unincorporated community
- Hobart, Michigan, an unincorporated community
- Hobart Township, Otter Tail County, Minnesota
- Hobart, Missouri, a ghost town
- Hobart, New York, a village
  - Hobart station (New York), part of the New York Central Railroad
- Hobart Township, Barnes County, North Dakota
- Hobart, Oklahoma, a city
- Hobart, Washington, a census-designated place
- Hobart, Wisconsin, a village

== People ==
- Hobart (surname)
- Hobart (given name)

== Titles ==
- Baron Hobart, a subsidiary title held by the Earl of Buckinghamshire
- Hobart Baronets

== Ships ==
- Hobart-class destroyer, a ship class of the Royal Australian Navy
- HMAS Hobart, three ships of the Royal Australian Navy
- HMS Hobart (1794), a Royal Navy sloop

== Other uses ==
- Hobart (magazine) (also called Hobart Pulp), a literary journal
- Hobart Corporation, a manufacturer of commercial kitchen equipment
- 4225 Hobart, an asteroid

== See also ==
- Hubert
