= Uberto =

Uberto is an Italian first name, the equivalent of Hubert; variations include Oberto, Ubertino and female forms are Uberta, Oberta, Ubertina.

Notable people with this name include:

- Uberto Allucingoli, Italian cardinal
- Sante Uberto Barbieri, bishop of the Methodist Church
- Ubertino I da Carrara, (died 1345), Lord of Padua
- Ubertino of Casale (1259–1329), Italian Fransciscan
- Pope Urban III, born Uberto Crivelli
- Uberto Lanfranchi (died 1137), Archbishop of Pisa
- Uberto De Morpurgo (1896–1961), Austrian-born Italian tennis player
- Ubertino Pallavicini (died 1278), Margrave of Bodonitsa
- Uberto Pasolini (born 1957), Italian film producer and director
- Uberto Zanolli, Italo-Mexican composer
