= Hobart station =

Hobart station may refer to:

- Hobart Railway Station, a former railway station in Hobart, Tasmania, Australia
- Hobart station (Indiana), a disused railway station in Hobart, Indiana, United States
- Hobart station (New York), a disused railway station in Hobart, New York, United States

== See also ==
- Hobart (disambiguation)
