= Hubberd =

Hubberd is a surname. Notable people with the surname include:

- Edward Hubberd (died 1602), Member of the Parliament of England
- Mother Hubberd of Mother Hubberd's Tale

== See also ==
- Hubbard (surname)
- Hubbert
