= Robert Hobart =

Robert Hobart may refer to:

- Sir Robert Hobart, 1st Baronet (1836–1928), British politician
- Robert Hobart, 4th Earl of Buckinghamshire (1760–1816), British politician
- Sir Robert Hampden Hobart, 3rd Baronet (1915–1988) of the Hobart baronets

== See also ==
- Hobart (disambiguation)
