= Forest Lawn Memorial Park (Hollywood Hills) =

Cemetery in Los Angeles County, California

Forest Lawn Memorial Park – Hollywood Hills
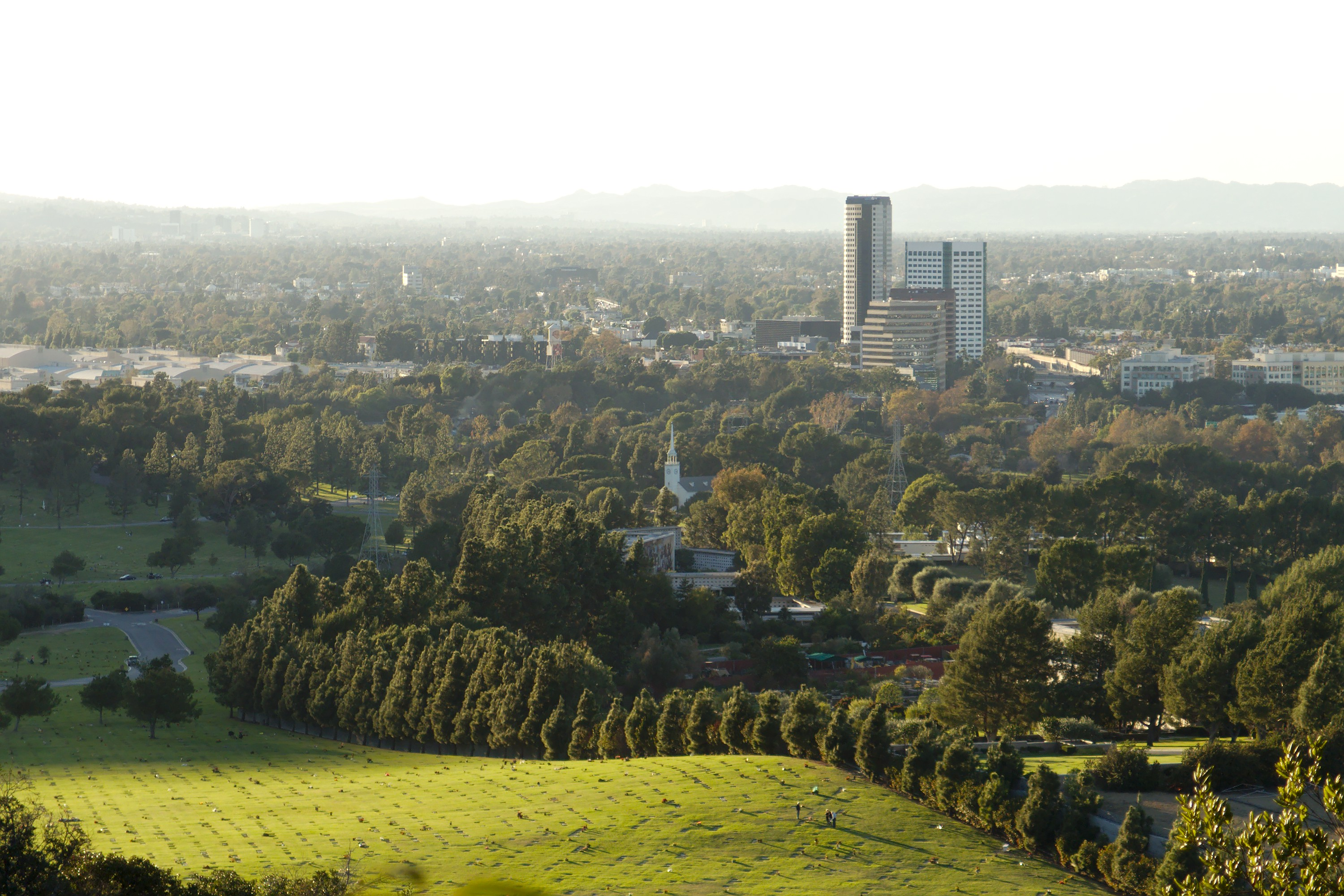
- View from Griffith Park
- Interactive map of Forest Lawn Memorial Park – Hollywood Hills

Details
- Established: March 1952 (parent company established in 1906 by Hubert L. Eaton)
- Location: Hollywood Hills, Los Angeles, California, U.S.
- Coordinates: 34.145°N 118.320°W
- Type: Public
- Owned by: Forest Lawn
- No. of graves: 146,969
- Website: forestlawn.com/hollywood-hills

Forest Lawn Memorial Park – Hollywood Hills is one of the six Forest Lawn cemeteries in Southern California, United States. It is located at 6300 Forest Lawn Drive in the Hollywood Hills neighborhood of Los Angeles.

== History ==
The first Forest Lawn, in Glendale, was founded in 1906 by a group of businessmen who, 6 years later, hired Dr. Hubert Eaton, a firm believer in a joyous life after death. He believed that most cemeteries were "unsightly stone yards", and pledged to create one that would reflect his optimistic beliefs and be "as different, as unlike other cemeteries as sunshine is to darkness, as eternal life is unlike death." He stated "I shall try to build at Forest Lawn a great park, devoid of misshapen monuments and other customary signs of Earthly death, but filled with towering trees, sweeping lawns, splashing fountains, singing birds, beautiful statuary, cheerful flowers, noble memorial architecture with interiors full of light and color, and redolent of the world's best history and romances."

Forest Lawn Hollywood Hills is the second oldest of the Forest Lawn cemetery properties.

By 1946, Forest Lawn at Glendale had bought some 490 acres (200 ha) of land which had been known as the Lasky Ranch, the Providencia Ranch, which had a house and outbuildings, including stables and corrals, and part of the Hudkins Ranch, also known as the Old Lasky Ranch. The Lasky Ranch had been used as a film location since the early 1910s, and films made there included All Quiet on the Western Front (1930) and several of Charlie Chaplin's early comedies, including Sunnyside (1919). The 1,000-acre (400 ha) Old Lasky Ranch had also been used for filming many movies, and Warner Brothers had leased it in 1929. D. W. Griffith's The Birth of a Nation (1915) had been largely filmed on the Providencia Ranch.

In 1950, after a four-year permit process, Hubert Eaton began construction of a new cemetery on his land at Hollywood Hills. A curving and irregular road, laid out by 1951 among the rolling green hills, gave a rural effect in the heart of the Los Angeles metropolitan area. The first buildings, a mortuary, an office, a garage, and a maintenance warehouse, were also built in 1951, and the new cemetery was opened for burials on March 4, 1952.

Part of a mausoleum called the Court of Remembrance was constructed in 1957.

== Features ==
=== Hall of Liberty ===
A section of the Birth of Liberty mosaic

- The Hall of Liberty features statues of George Washington and Thomas Jefferson and the Birth of Liberty mosaic. At 162 feet (49 m) long and 28 feet (8.5 m) high, Birth of Liberty is the largest historical mosaic in the United States. It is composed of ten million pieces of Venetian glass and depicts twenty-five scenes from early America, from 1619 to 1787.
- The Old North Church, a precise replica of Boston's historic church, from Henry Wadsworth Longfellow's poem "Paul Revere's Ride". The historical rooms have documents and mementos of the colonial period.
- The Hall of Liberty American History Museum has a copy of the Liberty Bell and other exhibits. The museum has a 1,200-seat auditorium.
- Monument to Washington, a marble and bronze tribute to America's first president, created by sculptor Thomas Ball. Four of Washington's generals are honored in the memorial.

=== Lincoln Terrace ===
- The Lincoln Terrace features a 16-foot (4.9 m) bronze statue of Abraham Lincoln, the 16th president of the United States, by Augustus St. Gaudens. It is also flanked by a panoramic mosaic depicting key scenes from Lincoln's life.

=== Plaza of Mesoamerican Heritage ===
Aztec calendar replica in the plaza

The Plaza of Mesoamerican Heritage had indigenous/non-Christian sculptures by Meliton Salas Rodriguez, of Guadalajara, Mexico. Salas used hand tools to first quarry, then work, the native Mexican stone into precisely scaled, detailed replicas of artwork and artifacts that are representative of the Aztec, Huastec, Maya, Mixtec, Olmec, Teotihuacan, Toltec, Totonac, and Zapotec civilizations that preceded both Spanish colonialism and modern Mexican culture. The Plaza stood in contrast to the Christian and patriotic American themes which were originally reflective of the culture at Forest Lawn Hollywood Hills and other Forest Lawn Memorial Parks since their inception by Christian American businessman Hubert L. Eaton. A smooth Olmecan head, an intricate Aztec sun calendar and a sinuous Teotihuacan bas relief were some of the sculptural features of the plaza that were set off by crushed stone walkways and complemented by groupings of Mesoamerican plants.

The entire display, however, has been removed and placed in storage.

== Notable interments ==
Many prominent people, especially from the entertainment industry, are interred at Forest Lawn, including Brittany Murphy, Matthew Perry, Bette Davis, Paul Walker, Aaron Carter, Bill Paxton, Bob Barker, and Peter Cullen.

== See also ==
- Forest Lawn Memorial Park (Glendale)
- List of cemeteries in the United States
- San Fernando Valley
- History of the San Fernando Valley
- Rancho Providencia – First Movie Town 1912
- Nestor Film Company – Valley ranch
- Providencia Ranch – Oak Crest – Universal/Bison 101 Movies
- Universal City – Two valley ranch locations
