= Huib =

Huib is a Dutch given name. Notable people with this name include:

- Huib Bakker (born 1965), Dutch physicist
- Huib Drion (1917–2004), Dutch law scholar and judge
- Huib Emmer (born 1951), Dutch composer
- Huib Luns (1881–1942), Dutch painter, sculptor and writer
- Huib Ruijgrok (born 1944), Dutch football coach
