= La Vierge aux anges =

Painting by William-Adolphe Bouguereau

The Virgin with Angels
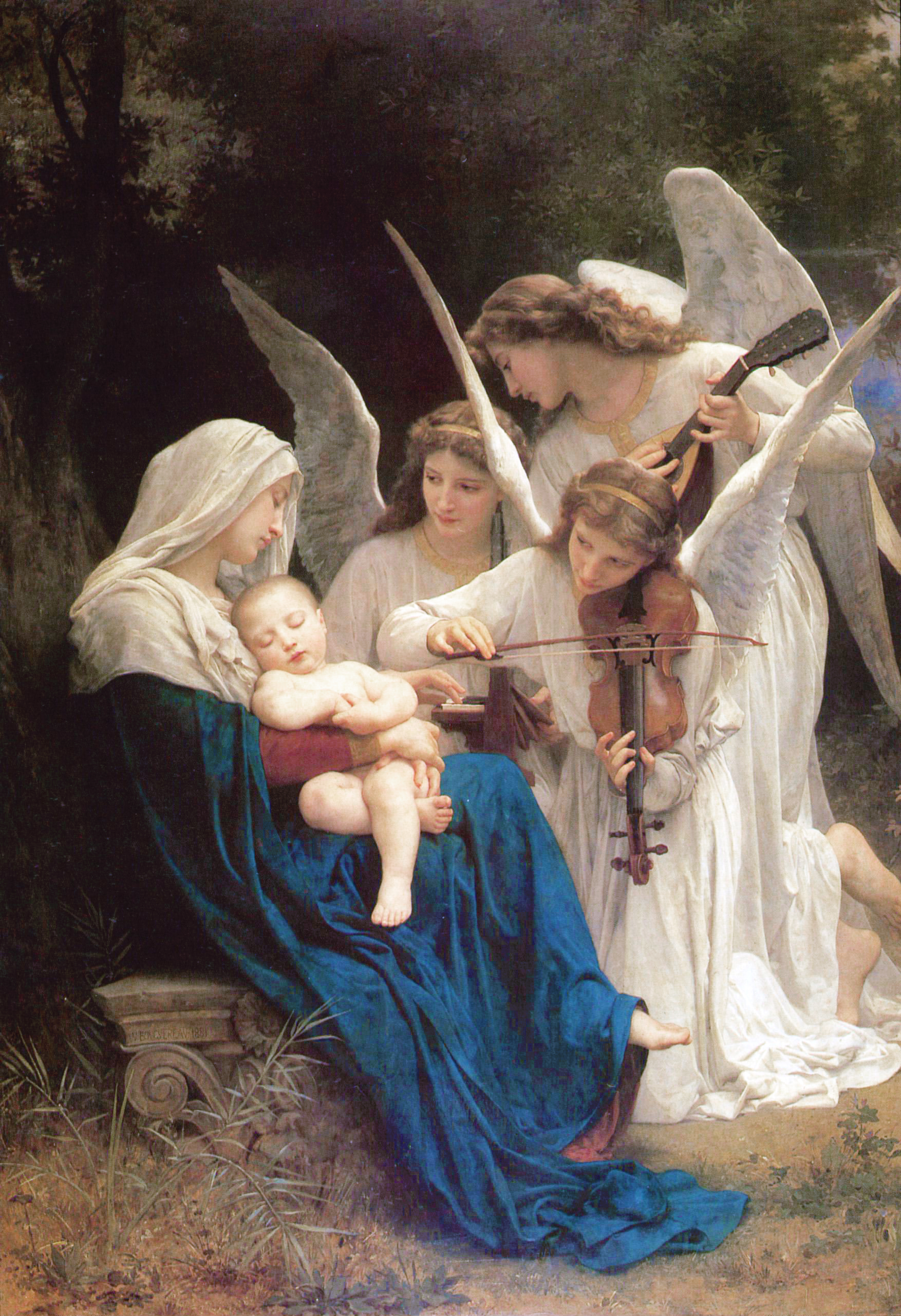
- Artist: William-Adolphe Bouguereau
- Year: 1881
- Medium: Oil on canvas
- Dimensions: 213.4 cm × 152.4 cm (84.0 in × 60.0 in)
- Location: Forest Lawn Museum, Glendale, California, US

The Virgin with Angels (French: La Vierge aux anges), also known as The Song of the Angels, is an oil painting executed in 1881 by the French artist William-Adolphe Bouguereau. Its dimensions are 213.4 × 152.4 cm. It is now in the Forest Lawn Museum in Glendale, California.

== History ==
William Bouguereau (1825–1905) studied at the Ecole des Beaux Arts in Paris, as well as in Rome, and was considered a leading French academic painter in the nineteenth century. Legend has it that he searched for a model for the painting’s figures and found them in his first wife, Nelly Monochablon, who posed for the angels, one by one, and at last, with a child in her arms. The painting shows the Virgin Mary holding the baby Jesus Christ, who is calmly asleep in a pastoral setting, while a trio of angels hovers nearby. It highlights Bouguereau’s ability to render realistic flesh tones and subtle gradations of white.

Song of the Angels, which debuted at the Paris Salon in 1881, was once a part of the Wanamaker Collection in Philadelphia. It was acquired by Forest Lawn Memorial Park in 1940 for a chapel in the Church of the Recessional. Originally, a stained-glass window was going to be the focal point of the chapel, but instead Forest Lawn decided to purchase the painting from Schnittjer’s gallery. A large gothic-style liturgical frame was built for the painting by Forest Lawn craftsmen, and it is still presented in this wooden frame at the Forest Lawn Museum.

== Conservation ==
In 2005, the painting traveled to the Getty Center in Los Angeles for a cleaning with funding from the Conservation Partnership Program. Chief Paintings Conservator, Mark Leonard, worked on the painting for months to remove the old varnish and restore its original colors. Song of the Angels was exhibited at the Getty Center, alongside a preparatory oil sketch and a later, half-size replica from Bouguereau’s own hand.

== Gallery ==
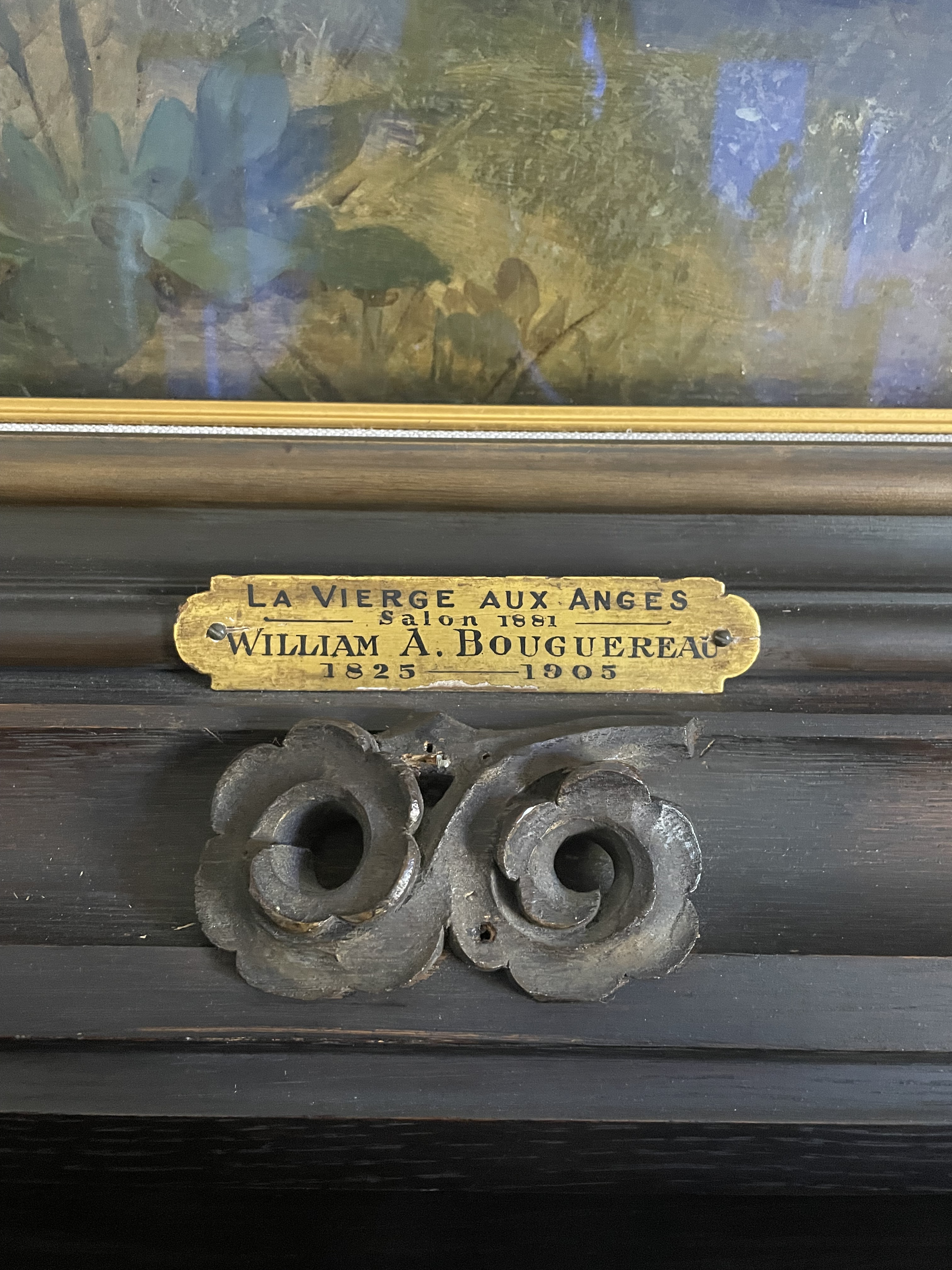
Tag on the Song of the Angels

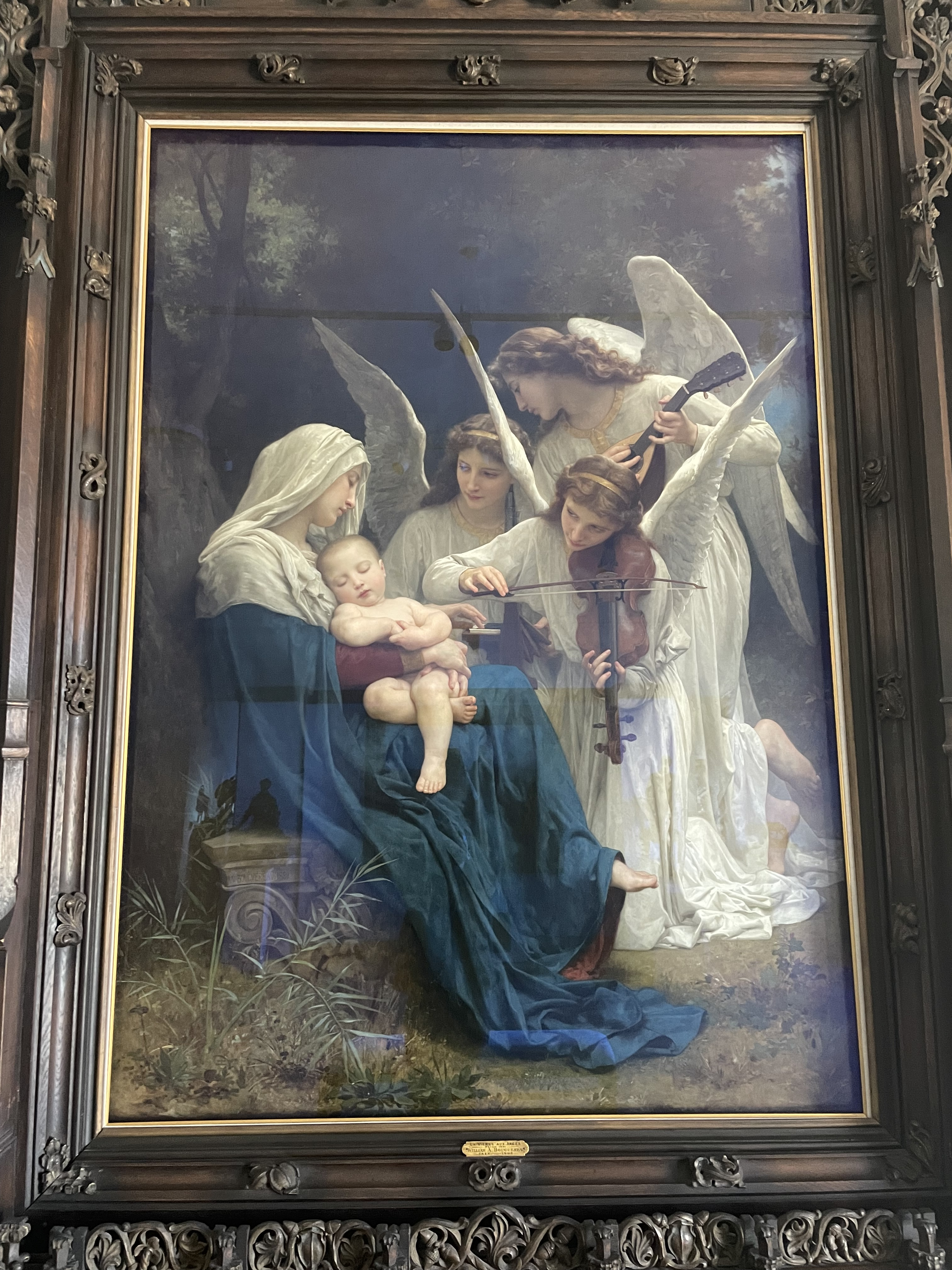
A trio of angels are playing music to a sleeping mother and child.

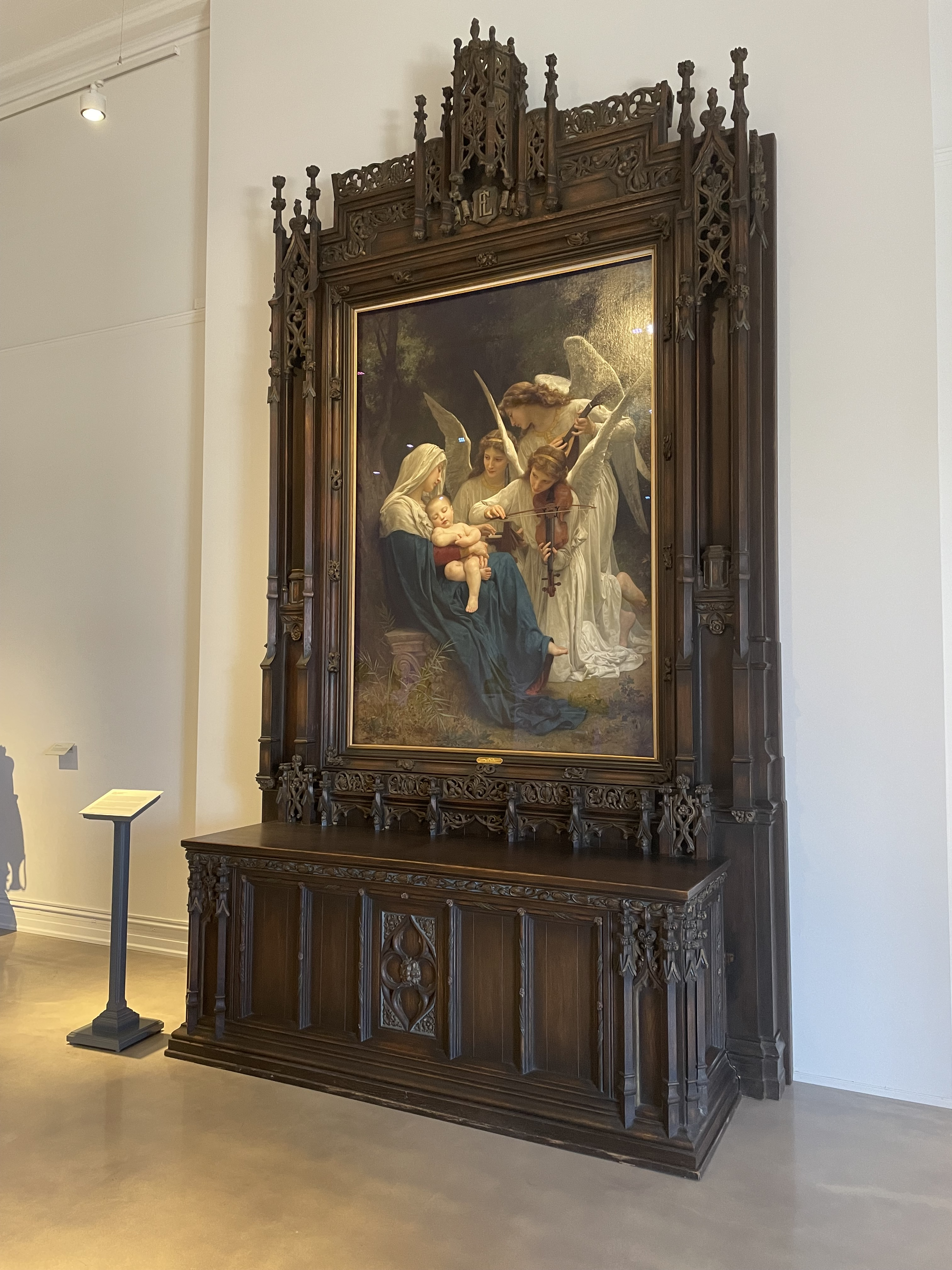
Song of the Angels in ornate, gothic-style wooden frame in Forest Lawn Museum.
