= Hobart (surname) =

Hobart is an English surname. Notable people with the surname include:

- Aaron Hobart (1787–1858), US Representative from Massachusetts
- Albinia Hobart (1737/8–1816), British celebrity
- Alice Tisdale Hobart (1882–1967), American novelist
- Barry Hobart (1942–2011), a Dayton, Ohio television horror host known as "Dr. Creep"
- Clarence Hobart (1870–1930), American tennis player
- Garret Hobart (1844–1899), 24th Vice President of the United States (1897–1899)
- George Hobart, 3rd Earl of Buckinghamshire (1731–1804)
- George V. Hobart (1867–1926), Canadian-American humorist and playwright
- Harrison Carroll Hobart (1815–1902), Union Army colonel during the American Civil War, politician, and lawyer
- Henry Hobart (disambiguation)
- John Hobart (disambiguation)
- Ken Hobart (born 1961), American football player
- Lauren Hobart (born 1969/1970), American businesswoman
- Lewis P. Hobart (1873–1954), American architect
- Miles Hobart (1595–1632), English politician
- Percy Hobart (1885–1957), British Second World War major general and armoured vehicle innovator
- Sir Robert Hobart, 1st Baronet (1836–1928), British politician
- Robert Hobart, 4th Earl of Buckinghamshire
- Rose Hobart (1906–2000), American actress
- Sarah Dyer Hobart (1845–1921), American poet and author
- Simon Hobart (1964–2005), British gay nightlife impresario
