= Oberto =

Oberto or Otbert may refer to:

- Oberto (opera), an opera by Giuseppe Verdi
- Oberto Sausage Company, a manufacturer of sausage products based in Kent, Washington, USA
- Oberto I (died 975), Count palatine of Italy and founder of the Obertenghi dynasty
- Oberto II (died after 1014), Margrave of Milan, son of Oberto I
- Oberto II of Biandrate, Count of Biandrate and a participant in the Fourth Crusade
- Oberto, a character in Alcina by Georg Friedrich Händel

== People with the surname ==
- Fabricio Oberto (born 1975), Argentine basketball player
- Francesco di Oberto, 14th-century early Renaissance painter
- Luis Enrique Oberto (1928–2022), Venezuelan politician
- Orlando Oberto (born 1980), Italian baseball player

== People with the given name ==
- Oberto Airaudi (1950-2013), founder of the spiritual community of Damanhur near Turin, Italy
- Oberto Doria (died 1295), politician and admiral of the Republic of Genoa
- Oberto Pelavicino, or Pallavicino (1197–1269), Italian field captain under Holy Roman Emperor Frederick II
- Oberto Spinola, a leader of the Republic of Genoa in the 13th century

== See also ==
- Otbert of Liège (died 1119), bishop of Liège and major figure in the financing of the First Crusade
