= Forest Lawn Memorial-Parks & Mortuaries =

American cemetery and mortuary operator

Forest Lawn Memorial-Parks & Mortuaries is an American corporation that owns and operates a chain of cemeteries, funeral homes and crematories in Los Angeles, Orange, and Riverside counties in Southern California.

== History ==
The company was founded by a group of San Francisco businessmen in 1906. Hubert Eaton assumed management control in 1917 and is credited with being Forest Lawn's "founder" because of his origination of the "memorial-park" plan. The first location was in Tropico, which later became part of Glendale, California.

Its facilities are officially known as memorial parks. The parks are best known for the large number of celebrity burials as well as cremation services, especially in the Glendale and Hollywood Hills locations. Eaton opened the first funeral home on dedicated cemetery grounds after a battle with established funeral directors, who saw the "combination" operation as a threat. He remained as general manager until his death in 1966, when he was succeeded by his nephew, Frederick Llewellyn.

== Memorial parks ==
- Forest Lawn Cemetery in Cathedral City, California
- Forest Lawn – Covina Hills in Covina Hills, Covina, California
- Forest Lawn – Cypress in Cypress, California
- Forest Lawn Memorial Park in Glendale, California
- Forest Lawn Memorial Park in Hollywood Hills, Los Angeles, California
- Forest Lawn Memorial Park in Long Beach, California

== See also ==
- Forest Lawn (disambiguation)
