= Huppertz =

Huppertz is a German surname. Notable people with the surname include:

- Gottfried Huppertz (1887–1937), German composer
- Herbert Huppertz (1919–1944), German military pilot
- Joshua Huppertz (born 1994), German cyclist

== See also ==
- Hupperts
