= Hobart (given name) =

Hobart is the given name of:

- Hobart Alter (1933–2014), American businessman, a pioneer in the surfboard shaping industry, creator of the Hobie Cat, and founder of the Hobie company
- Hobart R. Alter (1897–1984), American politician
- Hobart Baumann Amstutz (1896–1980), bishop of the American Methodist Church and the United Methodist Church
- Hobart Hobey Baker (1892–1918), American hockey and football player, member of several hockey halls of fame
- Hobart B. Bigelow (1834–1891), American politician and 50th Governor of Connecticut
- Hobart Bosworth (1867–1943), American film actor, director, writer, and producer
- Hobart Brown (1934–2007), American sculptor
- John Henry Hobart Brown (1831–1888), American Episcopal bishop who went by the name Hobart
- Hobart M. Cable (1842–1910), American musical instrument manufacturer, businessman, and founder of The Hobart M. Cable Co.
- Hobart Cavanaugh (1886–1950), American character actor
- Hobart Chatfield-Taylor (1865–1945), American writer, novelist, and biographer
- Hobart Earle (born 1960), Venezuelan conductor and musician
- Hobart Freeman (1920–1984), American charismatic preacher and author who advocated faith healing
- Hobart R. Gay (1894–1983), US Army lieutenant general
- Hobart Henley (1887–1964), American silent film actor, director, and screenwriter
- Hobart Huson, American author, webmaster, and illicit drug manufacturer
- Hobart Krum (1833–1914), American lawyer and politician
- Hobart Hobie Landrith (1930–2023), American baseball player
- Hobart Lytal (1909–1990), American football player and coach
- Hobart Nichols (1869–1962), American painter and illustrator
- Hobart Reimann (1897–1986), American virologist
- Hobart Sterling Sacket (1844–1911), American farmer and politician
- Hobart Smith (1897–1965), American old-time musician
- Hobart Muir Smith (1912–2013), American herpetologist
- Hobart Stocking (1846–1920), American politician
- Hobart Taylor Jr. (1920–1981), American attorney and civil servant
- Hobart Upjohn (1876–1949), American architect
- H. J. Whitley (1847–1931), Canadian-American businessman and real estate developer. Known as one of the "Fathers of Hollywood"
- Hobart Hurd Willard (1881–1974), American analytical and inorganic chemist
