= Drion's pill =

Hypothetical suicide pill

Drion's pill is a hypothetical suicide pill. It was proposed by Huib Drion, a former Dutch Supreme Court judge and professor of civil law. He argued that people aged 75 or over, living alone, should have the choice of ending their lives in a humane manner. The pill was supposed to be a two-stage pill whereby firstly one pill was taken which would enable another pill to be taken a number of days after the first pill which would then be lethal, but would otherwise be non-lethal. The idea behind this is that a person could act on an impulse and a waiting period seemed sensible.

So far this has been only discussed as a theoretical proposition. No such pill exists in the Netherlands or anywhere else.

== See also ==
- Euthanasia
- Huib Drion
- Suicide
