= Henry Hobart =

Henry Hobart may refer to:

- Sir Henry Hobart, 1st Baronet (died 1625), English Lord Chief Justice of the Common Pleas
- Sir Henry Hobart, 4th Baronet (c. 1658–1698), English MP for King's Lynn, Thetford, Norfolk and Bere Alston
- Henry Hobart (MP) (1738–1799), British MP for Norwich 1786–1799
- Henry Hobart (priest) (1774–1846), Dean of Windsor
- Henry Hobart (producer) (1888–1951), American film producer
- H. W. Hobart, British socialist and trade unionist
