= Étienne Hubert =

Étienne Hubert may refer to:

- Étienne Hubert (Arabist) d'Orléans (Stephanus Hubertus 1567–1614), French orientalist
- Étienne Hubert (canoeist) (born 1988), French canoeist
- Étienne Hubert de Cambacérès (1756–1818), French cardinal
