= Hobart Lytal =

American football player and coach (1909–1990)

Biographical details
- Born: October 30, 1909; Quinlan, Texas, U.S.
- Died: August 20, 1990 (aged 80)

Playing career

Football
- 1953–1956: Austin

Coaching career (HC unless noted)

Football
- 1967–1969: Tarleton State

Administrative career (AD unless noted)
- 1980–1991: Irving ISD (TX)

Head coaching record
- Overall: 4–24

Hobart Wade Lytal (October 30, 1909 – August 20, 1990) was an American football player and coach. He served as the head football coach at Tarleton State University in Stephenville, Texas from 1967 to 1969, compiling a record of 4–24. The high school football stadium in Quinlan, Texas is named in his honor.
