= Huub =

Huub is a Dutch and Flemish given name. Notable people with the name include:

- Huub Bals (1937–1988), the first director and creator of the International Film Festival Rotterdam (IFFR)
- Huub Bertens (born 1960), Dutch bridge player from Tilburg, Netherlands
- Huub Broers (born 1951), Belgian politician
- Huub Duyn (born 1984), Dutch racing cyclist
- Huub Huizenaar (1909–1985), Dutch boxer who competed in the 1924 Summer Olympics
- Huub Kortekaas (born 1935), Dutch sculptor and philosopher
- Huub Loeffen (born 1972), retired football striker from the Netherlands
- Huub Oosterhuis (1933–2023), Dutch theologian and poet
- Huub Rothengatter (born 1954), former racing driver from the Netherlands
- Huub Stapel (born 1954), Dutch actor
- Huub Stevens (born 1953), Dutch football manager and former defender
- Huub van Boeckel (born 1960), retired professional tennis player from the Netherlands
- Huub Zilverberg (born 1939), Dutch professional road bicycle racer
