= John Hobart =

John Hobart may refer to:

- Sir John Hobart, 2nd Baronet (1593–1647), English MP for Cambridge, Lostwithiel, Brackley and Norfolk 1641–1647
- Sir John Hobart, 3rd Baronet (1628–1683), English MP for Norfolk 1673–1685
- John Hobart, 1st Earl of Buckinghamshire (1693–1756), English MP for St Ives and Norfolk 1727–1728, Treasurer of the Chamber
- John Hobart, 2nd Earl of Buckinghamshire (1723–1793), English MP for Norwich, Lord of the Bedchamber and Lord Lieutenant of Ireland
- John Sloss Hobart (1738–1805), U.S. Senator from New York
- John Henry Hobart (1775–1830), Episcopal Bishop of New York
