= Hubbert =

Hubbert is a surname. Notable people with the surname include:

- Paul Hubbert (1935–2014), American politician
- Brad Hubbert (born 1941), American football player
- M. King Hubbert (1903–1989), American geoscientist

== See also ==
- Hubbertville, Alabama, unincorporated community, United States
- Hubbert Peak theory, theory on petroleum production named after M. King Hubbert
- Hubert
