= Huppert =

Huppert is an Eastern Ashkenazic surname derived from the Galizian Yiddish epithet Hupet/Hup't (הופּט) meaning head or chief. The Western Yiddish equivalent is הויפּט. It is equivalent to Haupt in German.

On July 23, 1787, Joseph II issued the decree, known as "Das Patent über die Judennamen" (Patent on Jewish Names). Jews were required to register their chosen German first names and family names with local authorities by the end of November 1787. The edict officially came into force on January 1, 1788. Those who failed to register or comply faced fines or expulsion. After the Austrian Partition of Poland, Berek Szmulewicz (son of Szmul Zbytkower) was the first Ashkenazi "Hupet" of Wieliczka for the Crown. The German name Huppert was simply the only one with a sound which matched the Galizian Yiddish pronunciation of the epithet (הופּט).

The German name itself ultimately derives from a nickname describing personal attributes combining Old High German (750 to 1050) "Hugh" (meaning "soul", "mind" or "intellect") with "beraht" (meaning "bright" or "shining"), given by the community to certain bright-minded individuals.

Notable people with the surname include:

- Bertram Huppert (1927–2023), German mathematician
- Boyd Huppert (born 1962), American TV journalist
- Dave Huppert (born 1957), baseball player
- Herbert Huppert (born 1943), geophysicist
- Hugo Huppert (born 1902) Jewish poet, translator and writer
- Isabelle Huppert (born 1953), French actress
- Jennifer Huppert (born 1962), Australian lawyer and politician
- Julian Huppert (born 1978), British scientist and politician

== See also ==
- Guus Hupperts (born 1992), Dutch professional footballer
