= Hobart, Missouri =

Extinct hamlet in Missouri, U.S.

Coordinates: 39°12′39″N 91°05′57″W

Hobart is an extinct town in Lincoln County, in the U.S. state of Missouri. The GNIS classifies it as a populated place.

A post office called Hobart was established in 1897, and remained in operation until 1903. The community has the name of Garret Hobart, 24th Vice President of the United States.
