= Francesco di Oberto =

Italian painter

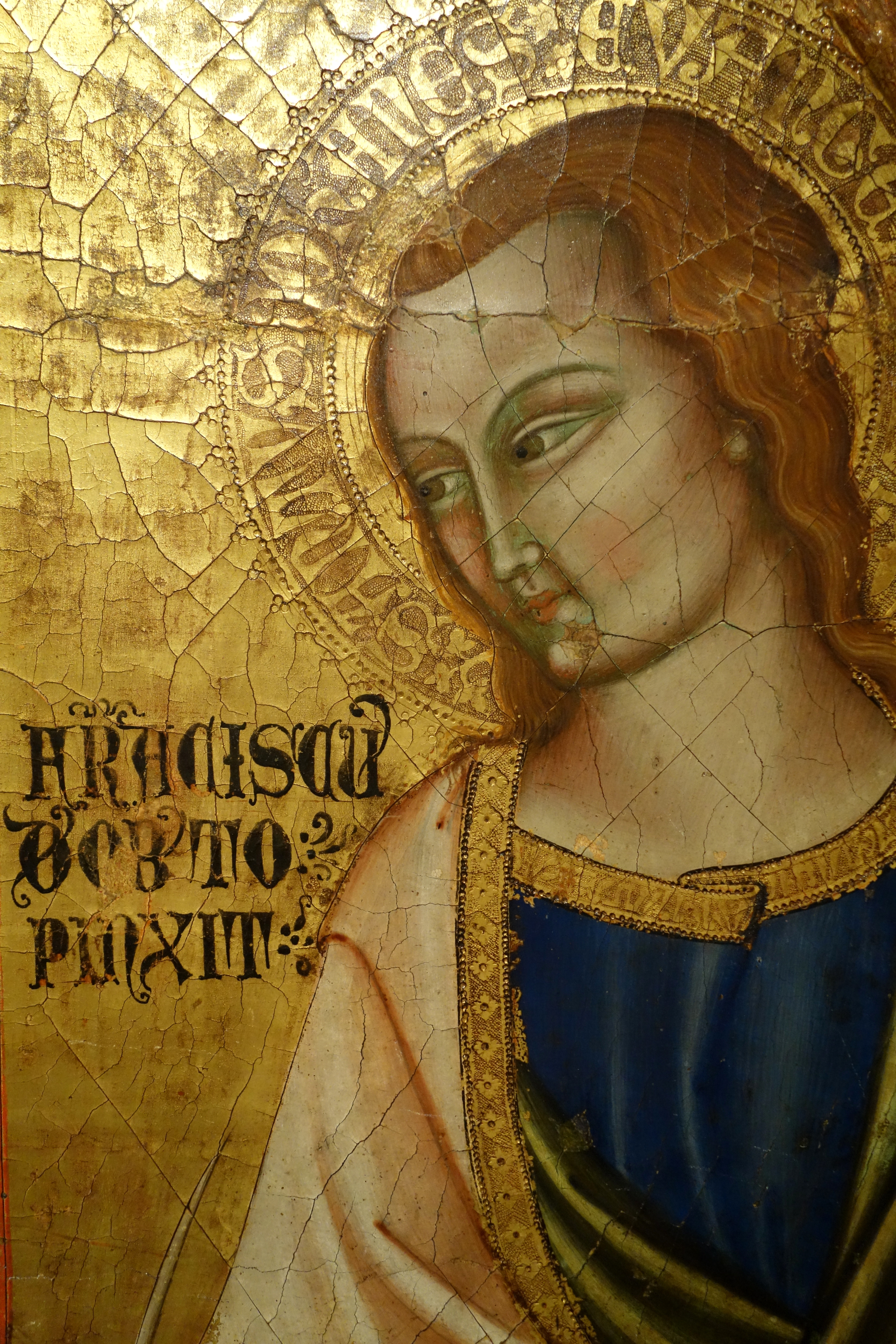
Detail from Madonna with Child and Saints Dominic and John the Evangelist, by Francesco D'Oberto, perhaps 1368 AD

Francesco di Oberto (14th century) was an Italian painter of the early Renaissance period, active mainly in Genoa. He painted a Madonna between two angels for the church of San Domenico.
