= Forest Lawn Memorial Park (Erlanger, Kentucky) =

Cemetery in Kenton County, Kentucky, US

- Interactive map of Forest Lawn Memorial Park

Details
- Established: 1937
- Location: Erlanger, Kentucky
- Country: United States
- Coordinates: 39°00′59″N 84°35′36″W
- Type: Public
- Owned by: Stonemor Partners
- No. of graves: >15,000
- Find a Grave: Forest Lawn Memorial Park

Forest Lawn Memorial Park, is a cemetery is located at 3227 Dixie Highway in Erlanger, Kentucky.

== Background ==
In 1935, Marguerite Stetter, of Bellevue, Kentucky purchased the old Tom Cody Estate on the Dixie Highway for use as a cemetery. In January 1937, the first burial took place at Forest Lawn. The absence of large grave markers and monuments made Forest Lawn unique in the 1930s. The cemetery was built as a "garden." Grave markers were to remain small and flush with the ground, thus, maintaining a rural garden atmosphere. The cemetery has become one of the largest in Northern Kentucky.

== Burials ==
Some of the more famous burials include Congressman Judson Lincoln Newhall, Country-Western star Kenny Price of WLWT Midwestern Hayride and Major League Baseball Player Jim Viox of the Pittsburgh Pirates.
