= Hubert L. Eaton =

American businessman

- Born: Hubert Lewright Eaton; June 3, 1881; Liberty, Missouri, U.S.
- Died: September 20, 1966 (aged 85); Beverly Hills, California, U.S.
- Occupation: Businessman

Hubert Lewright Eaton (June 3, 1881 – September 20, 1966) was an American businessman who is known for Forest Lawn Memorial-Parks & Mortuaries in California.

== Early life ==
Hubert Eaton was born in Liberty, Missouri, on June 3, 1881, the son of James Rodolphus Eaton and Martha Elizabeth Lewright.

== Career ==
In 1912, Eaton and Charles Simms entered into a contract with Forest Lawn Cemetery in Tropico (now Glendale), California, to manage the sales of burial property. In 1917, Eaton conceived the "memorial-park" concept and Forest Lawn Cemetery was renamed Forest Lawn Memorial-Park. He envisioned Forest Lawn as a place for the living, having sweeping lawns and noble architecture, stained glass, and a place that uplifted the community rather than being a place of sorrow. Eaton became noted as, and referred to himself as, "The Builder" of Forest Lawn Glendale. During his life, he supervised the opening of Forest Lawn Hollywood Hills, Forest Lawn Cypress, and Forest Lawn Covina Hills in the greater Los Angeles area, which became the funeral or interment locations for many movie stars and other celebrities. With several beautiful chapels throughout the Glendale cemetery's park-like setting, it has also served as the wedding location for well-known celebrities, including U.S. President Ronald Reagan and his first wife, actress Jane Wyman.

Eaton's international connections enabled him to attract an incredible number of important art works to his memorial parks. He was well-known around the world as a collector and was respected at the highest levels of many governments.

== Personal life ==
In 1918, Eaton married Anna Ruth Munger, a divorcée who was previously married to LeRoy Munson Henderson. She had one son, LeRoy Munson Henderson Jr., who was adopted by Eaton and whose name was changed to Roy Munger Eaton. Roy Eaton was an executive with Forest Lawn in the 1930s and again in the late 1940s and 1950s.

On November 22, 1960, Eaton's wife died in Los Angeles, California. She was 75.

On September 20, 1966, Eaton died in Beverly Hills, California. He was 85.

Upon Eaton's death, he was entombed in the "Memorial Court of Honor" in the Great Mausoleum in his Forest Lawn Memorial Park Glendale.

Roy Munger Eaton was cremated and scattered at sea.

Eaton's friend Walt Disney, himself too ill to attend, was an honorary pallbearer at Eaton's funeral.

=== Legacy ===
In 2017, the Greater Los Angeles Area Council renamed a BSA camp after him: the Hubert Eaton Scout Reservation.
