= Forest Lawn Memorial Park (Glendale, California) =

American cemetery and museum in California

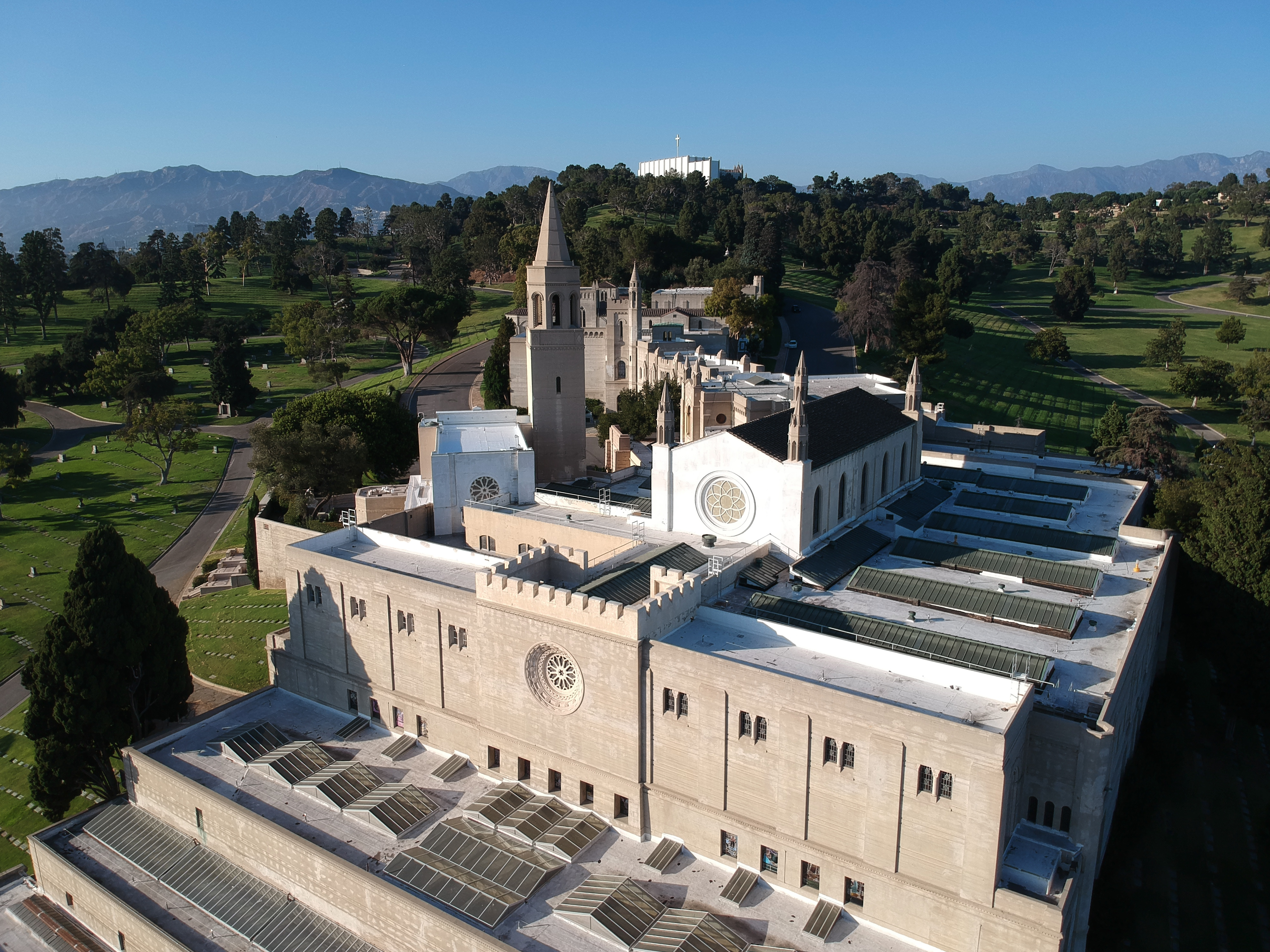
- Forest Lawn's Great Mausoleum
- Interactive map of Forest Lawn Memorial Park

Details
- Established: 1906; 120 years ago
- Location: Glendale, California, U.S.
- Coordinates: 34.125°N 118.240°W
- Type: Private
- Owned by: Forest Lawn
- Size: 300 acres (120 ha)
- No. of graves: 250,000+
- No. of interments: 250,000+
- Website: www.forestlawn.com

Forest Lawn Memorial Park is a privately owned cemetery in Glendale, California, United States. It is the original and current flagship location of Forest Lawn Memorial-Parks & Mortuaries, a chain of six cemeteries and four additional mortuaries in Southern California.

== History ==
Forest Lawn Memorial Park was founded in 1906 as a not-for-profit cemetery by a group of businessmen from San Francisco. Hubert Eaton and C.B. Sims entered into a sales contract with the cemetery in 1912. Eaton took over its management in 1917. Although Eaton did not start Forest Lawn, he is credited as its "Founder" for his innovations of establishing the "memorial-park plan". He eliminated upright grave markers and brought in works by established artists. He was the first to open a funeral home on dedicated cemetery grounds. He was a firm believer in a joyous life after death.

Convinced that most cemeteries were "unsightly, depressing stoneyards," he pledged to create one that would reflect his optimistic Christian beliefs, "as unlike other cemeteries as sunshine is unlike darkness." He envisioned Forest Lawn as "a great park devoid of misshapen monuments and other signs of earthly death, but filled with towering trees, sweeping lawns, splashing fountains, beautiful statuary, and memorial architecture." A number of plaques stating Eaton's intentions are signed "The Builder." Frederick Llewellyn, Eaton's nephew, became CEO of Forest Lawn in 1966. In 1987, he was succeeded by his son, John Llewellyn, who died in April 2022.

Most of Forest Lawn's burial sections have evocative names, including Eventide, Babyland (for infants, shaped like a heart), Graceland, Inspiration Slope, Slumberland (for children and adolescents), Sweet Memories, Whispering Pines, Vesperland, Borderland (on the edge of the cemetery), and Dawn of Tomorrow.

Forest Lawn originally participated in racial segregation and "for decades refused entrance to blacks, Jews, and Chinese".

== Forest Lawn Museum ==
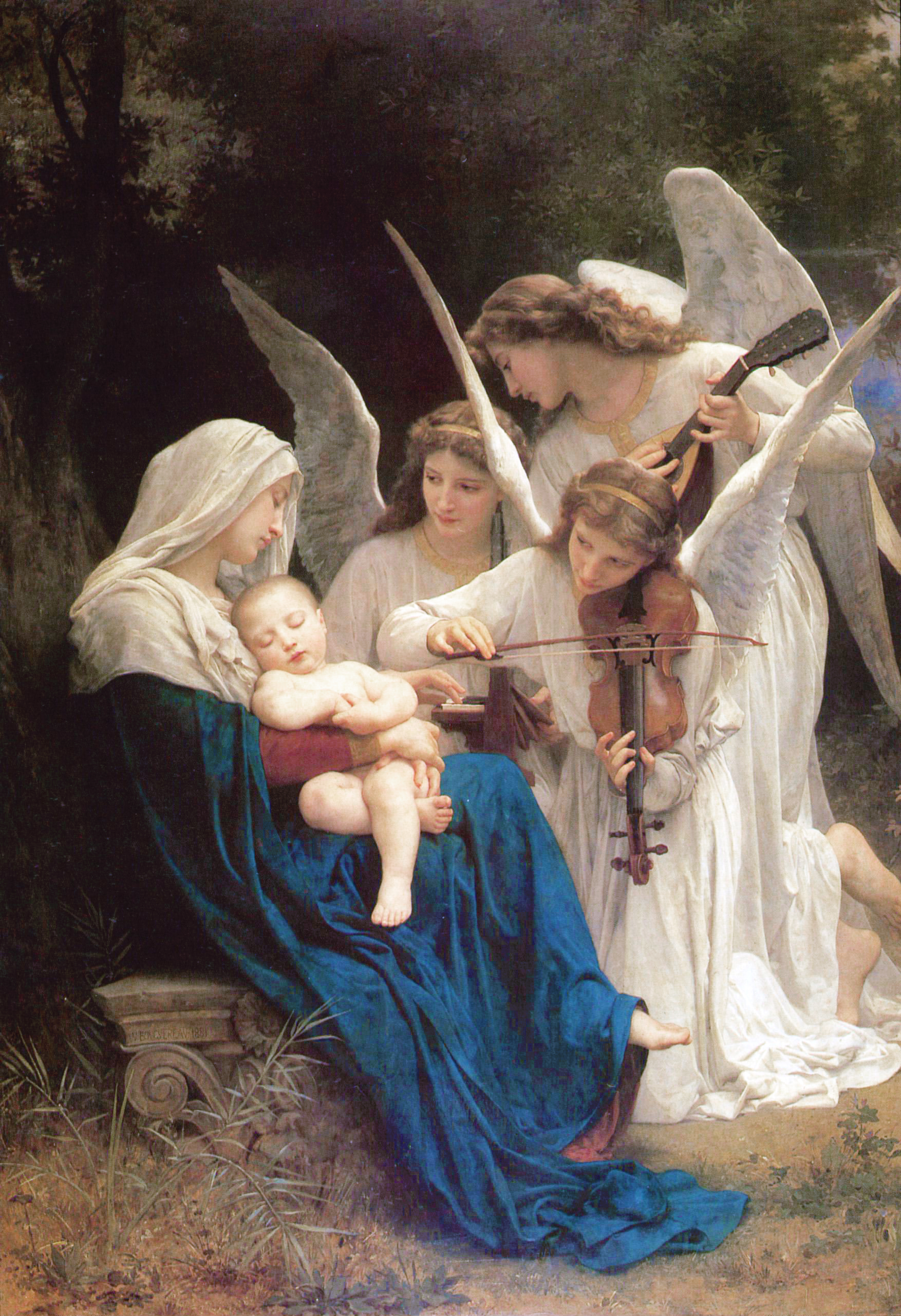
Song of the Angels by William Bouguereau, 1881

The Forest Lawn Museum in Glendale opened in 1952 and is located next to the Hall of Crucifixion-Resurrection. It rotates art exhibitions twice yearly, and has hosted solo exhibitions for Henri Matisse, Winslow Homer, Ian Hornak, Francisco Goya, Rembrandt, and Marc Davis. In 2021, it held an exhibition on Judson Studios, the oldest family-run stained glass studio in the United States, which produced numerous stained glass windows for Forest Lawn in the Hall of Crucifixion-Resurrection and the Great Mausoleum.

Forest Lawn Museum's art collection consists primarily of original bronze and marble sculptures by European and American artists. The permanent collection also includes stained glass that used to be part of William Randolph Hearst's collection. Forest Lawn purchased the stained glass works in 1954. The windows date from c. 1315 to 1575, and display impressive examples of French, German, and Austrian craftsmanship in Gothic and Renaissance styles.

=== Song of the Angels ===
One of the most famous objects in the Forest Lawn Museum's permanent collection is an oil painting titled Song of the Angels by French artist William Bouguereau (1825–1905), who painted the artwork in 1881. He studied at the Ecole des Beaux Arts in Paris, as well as in Rome, and was considered a leading French academic painter in the nineteenth century. Legend has it that Bouguereau searched for a model for the painting's figures and found them in his first wife, Nelly Monochablon, who posed for the angels, one by one, and at last, with a child in her arms. The painting shows a mother and child, calmly asleep in a pastoral setting, while a trio of angels hovers nearby. It highlights Bouguereau's ability to render realistic flesh tones and subtle gradations of white.

Song of the Angels was once a part of the Wanamaker Collection in Philadelphia. It was acquired by Forest Lawn Memorial Park in 1940 for a chapel in the Church of the Recessional. Originally, a stained-glass window was going to be the focal point of the chapel, but instead Forest Lawn decided to purchase the painting from Schnittjer's gallery. A large gothic-style liturgical frame was built for the painting by Forest Lawn craftsmen, and it is still presented in this wooden frame at the Forest Lawn Museum.

In 2005, the painting traveled to the Getty Center in Los Angeles for a cleaning with funding from the Conservation Partnership Program. Chief Paintings Conservator, Mark Leonard, worked on the painting for months to remove the old varnish and restore its original colors. Song of the Angels was exhibited at the Getty Center, alongside a preparatory oil sketch and a later, half-size replica from Bouguereau's own hand.

== Statuary and art ==
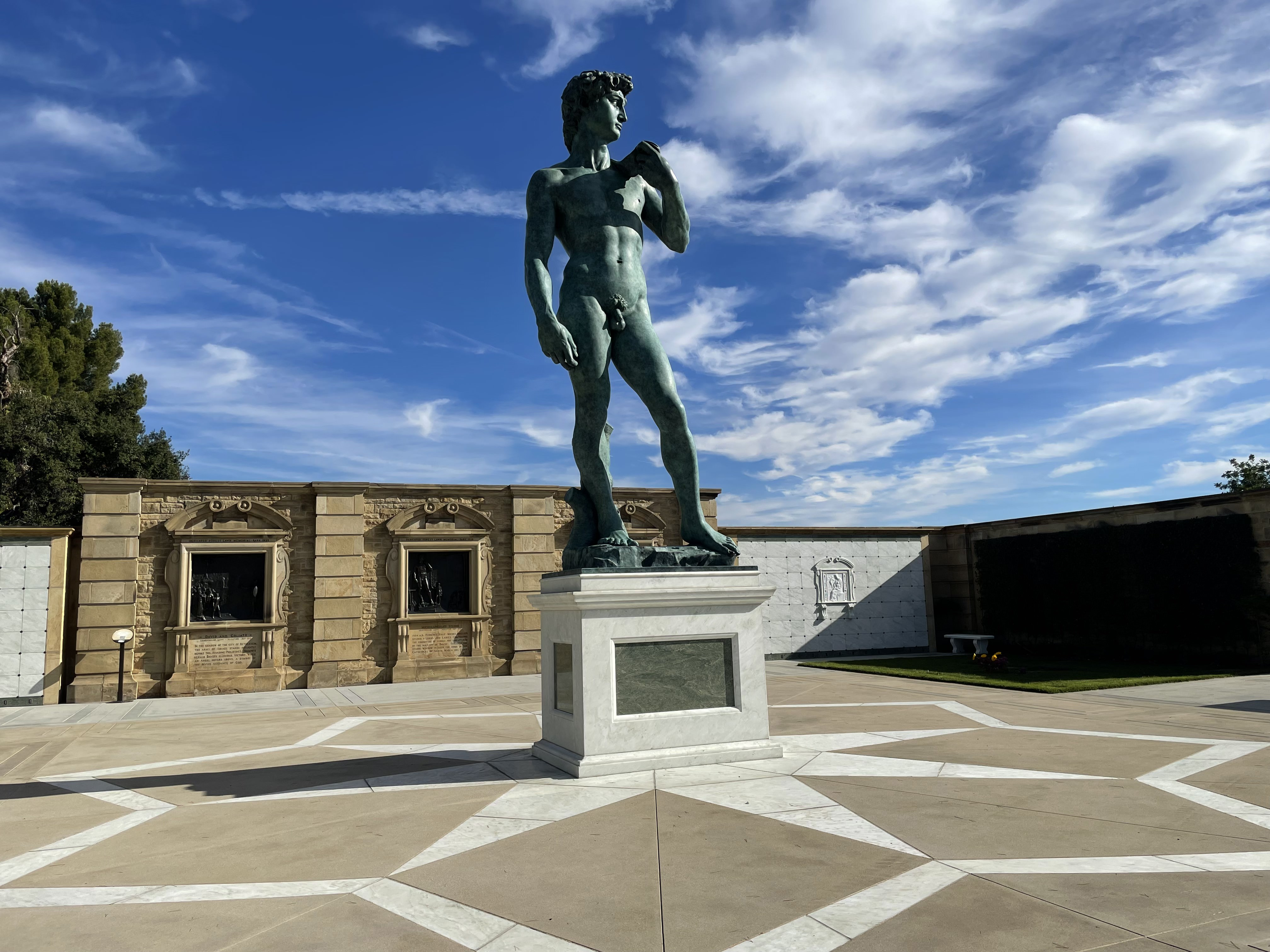
A replica of Michelangelo's David at Forest Lawn-Glendale

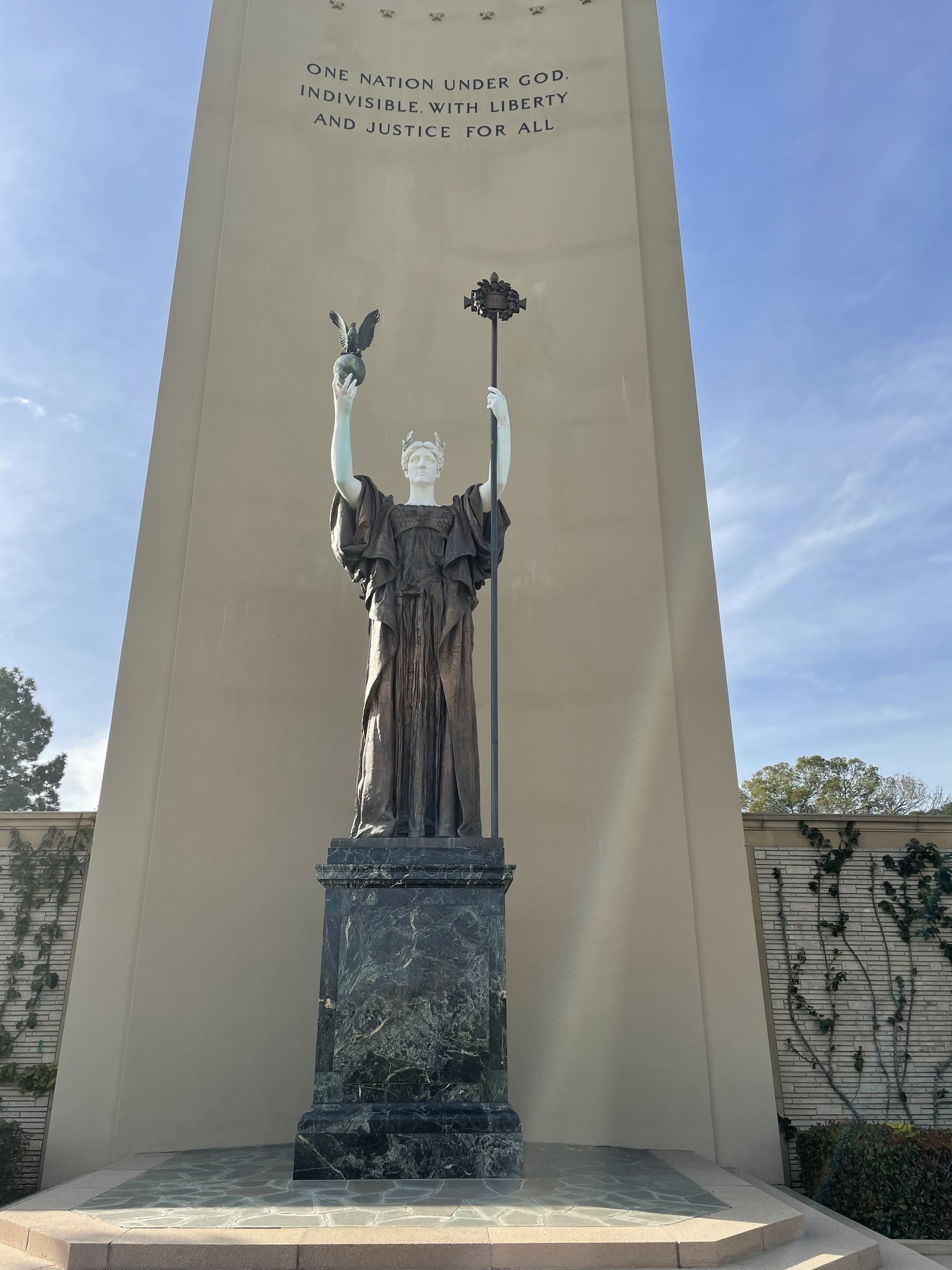
A replica statue of Daniel Chester French's The Republic in the Court of Freedom

=== The Court of David ===
The Court of David at Forest Lawn-Glendale is located right before the Mystery of Life garden on Cathedral Drive and is centered around a seventeen-foot-tall replica statue of Michelangelo Buonarroti's David. The first Forest Lawn replica of David was installed at Forest Lawn on June 22, 1939. The statue was placed using a series of ropes and pulleys. The statue fell due to seismic activity in 1971. The head and right foot of the 1939 replica is on display at the Forest Lawn Museum. Later Forest Lawn copies fell in 1994 and 2020. A new bronze replica of David was installed at Forest Lawn-Glendale in 2021.

The architectural inspiration for the Court of David is the Piazzale Michelangelo, a square in Florence, Italy dedicated to Michelangelo. Like the Court of David, the Piazzale Michelangelo is an open-air space that features a bronze replica of David in the center.

=== The Court of Freedom ===
The Court of Freedom is 750 feet (230 m) long and 300 feet (91 m) wide. It is enclosed on three sides by high walls and is open to the side that parallels the drive. The central point of the court is the mosaic rendition of John Trumbull's Signing of the Declaration of Independence. The mosaic measures at 20 feet (6.1 m) by 30 feet (9.1 m). It is three times the size of the original painting in the United States Capitol Rotunda in Washington, D.C. The mosaic consists of 700,000 pieces of Venetian glass in more than 1,500 colors. It was made in Italy expressly for Forest Lawn. There are two fifty-foot white pylons on each end of the court.

The left pylon displays a replica of The Republic by Daniel Chester French. The original work was displayed at the Chicago World's Fair in 1893. The Forest Lawn version is 18 feet (5.5 m)-tall and is one of two later originals, the other having been Commissioned for the Siegel-Cooper Big Store in Manhattan's Ladies' Mile in 1896. The figure holds a globe surmounted by an American eagle and clasps the staff of liberty crowned with a laurel wreath of honor. The right pylon displays an original statue of George Washington by John Quincy Adams Ward. This statue had been commissioned by the U.S. Congress, but no appropriation was made to pay for it, so it was purchased by Forest Lawn.

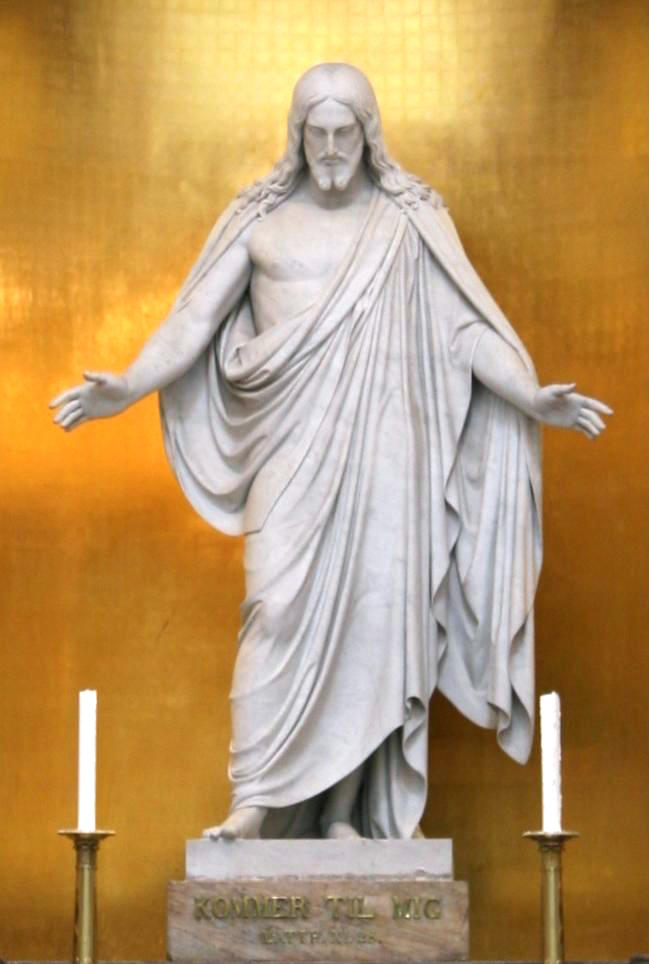
The Christus Copenhagen, Denmark. Three copies are dispersed throughout the cemetery.

=== Christus ===
Before the beginning of World War II in 1939, Forest Lawn commissioned a reproduction of Christus, an eleven-foot tall marble sculpture by Bertel Thorvaldsen (1770–1844). The original stands in the Church of Our Lady in Copenhagen, Denmark. The first small reproduction was received in 1925 and a larger reproduction was completed in 1940 and unveiled in 1946. A second small yellow copy was received in 1947. The Court of The Christus is placed above a waterfall between the Garden of Remembrance and the Garden of Memory.

== Great Mausoleum ==
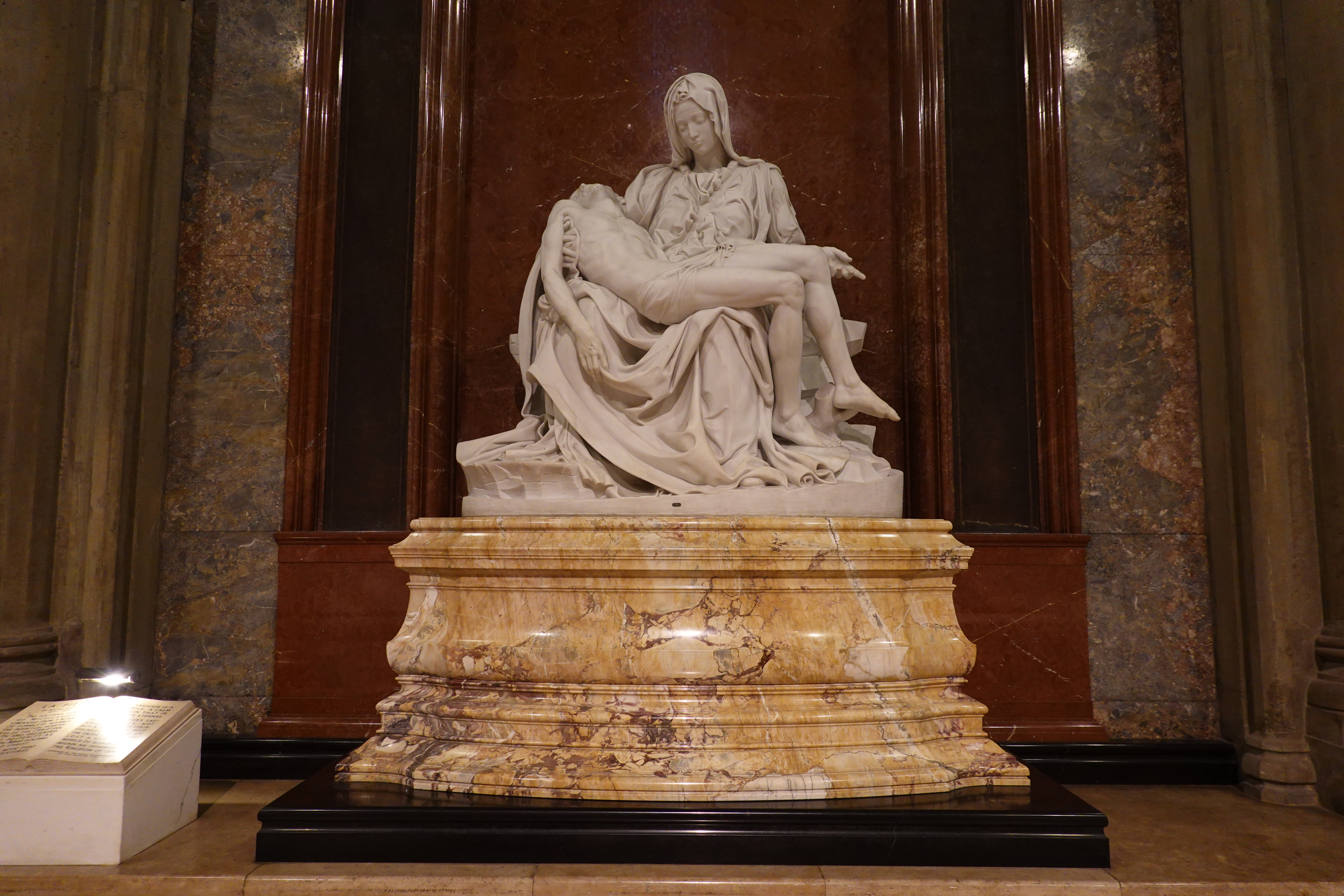
Replica of Michelangelo's Pietà at Forest Lawn – Glendale

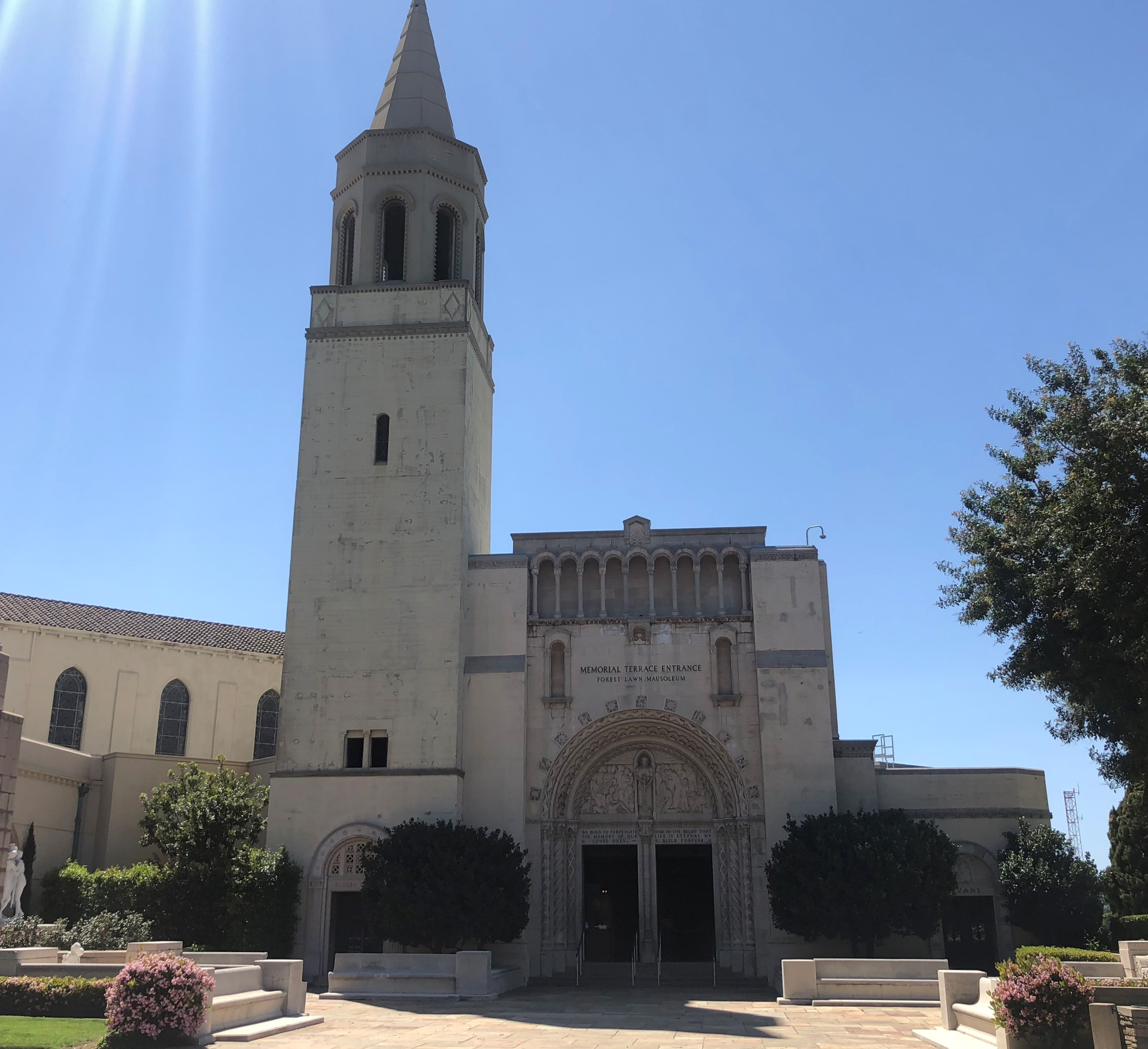
Current entrance of Great Mausoleum at Forest Lawn in Glendale, California

The Great Mausoleum features eleven terraces and over 100 stained glass windows. The massive building, which contains the same amount of steel and concrete as a 70-story skyscraper, embodies an eclectic mix of architectural styles, and is the park's artistic centerpiece.

The mausoleum's original architect was T. Paterson Ross. Numerous other people worked on it, and the construction designs underwent several rounds of changes. Construction began in 1917, and it was officially inaugurated in 1920. Construction finished only in the 1970s.

The Memorial Terrace was added in the late 1920s, and the Memorial Court of Honor was inaugurated in 1931. The gallery's largest piece is the Last Supper stained glass window by Rosa Caselli-Moretti and her sister, Cecilia Caselli-Moretti. This monumental project took over six years to complete. It was created in the sisters' studio in Perugia, Italy, and shipped to Glendale, where it was formally dedicated on April 28, 1931.

The Memorial Court of Honor contains replicas of seven sculptures by Michelangelo. The Memorial Court of Honor is the only place in the world where reproductions of all of Michelangelo's most renowned statues can be viewed in one location. One of the mausoleum's last building phases incorporated French Gothic architecture with lofty ceilings and large stained-glass windows, creating an ethereal and tranquil space.

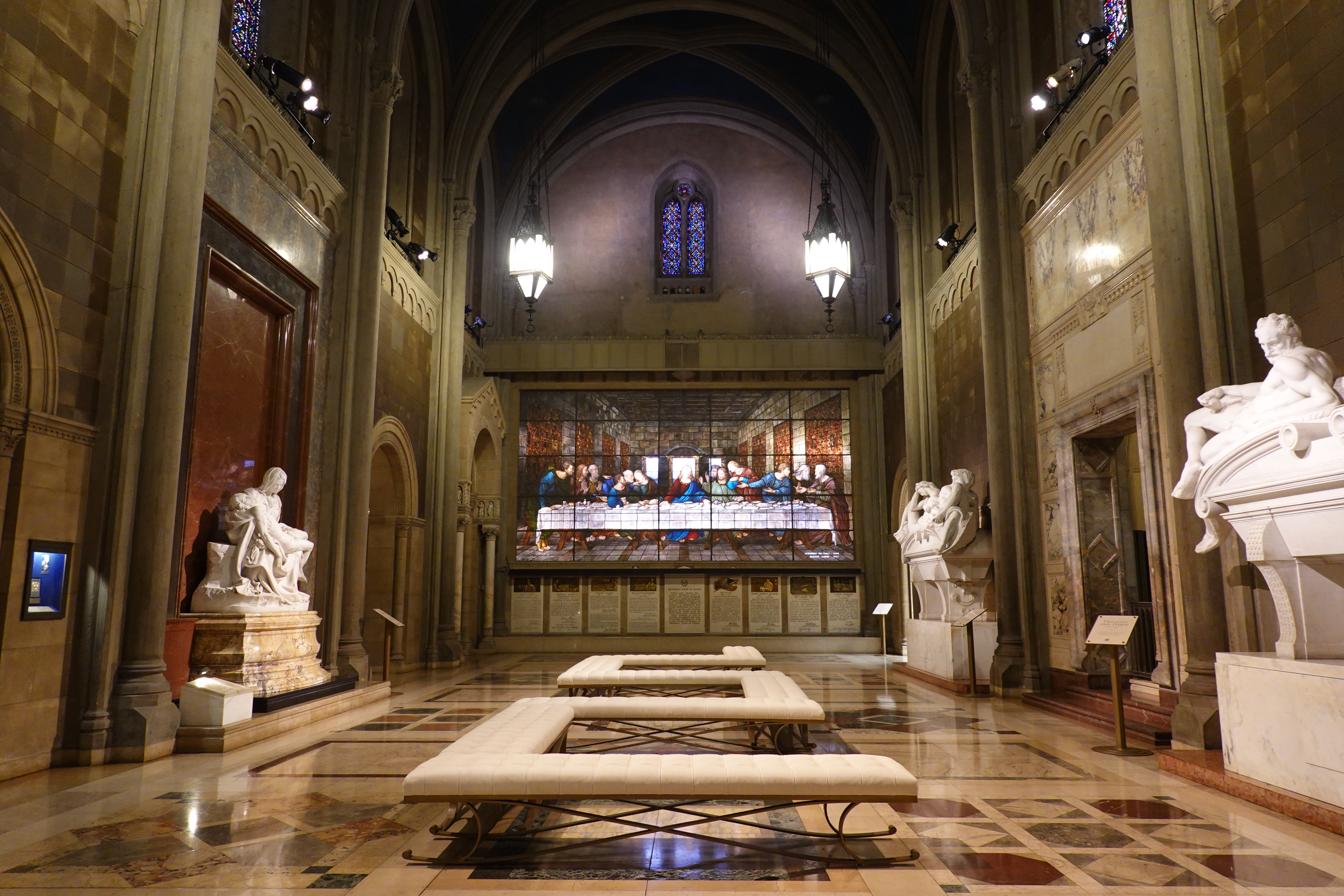
Forest Lawn Stained Glass Replica of Last Supper in Memorial Court of Honor

== Churches at Forest Lawn ==
=== Little Church of the Flowers ===
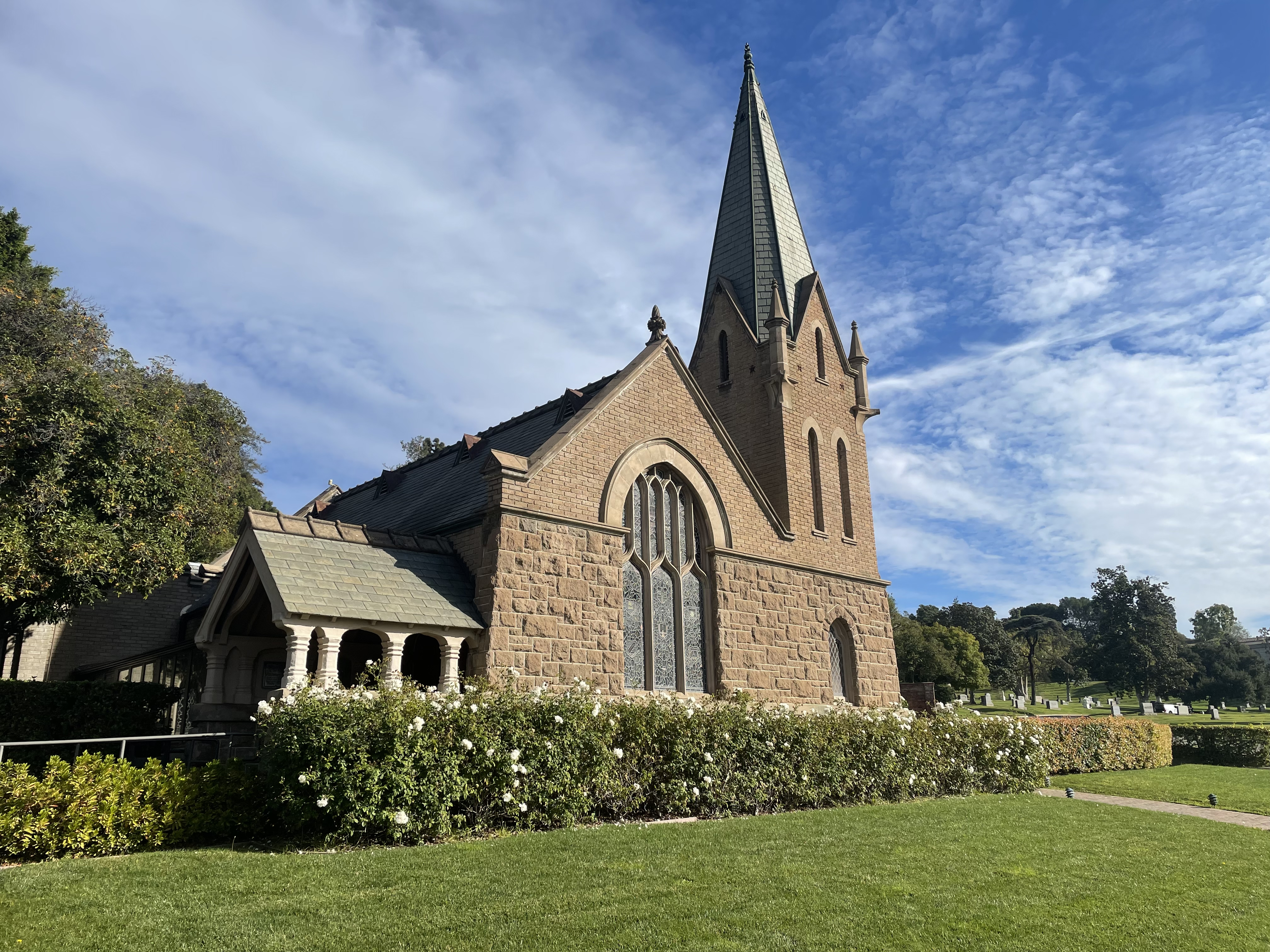
Little Church of the Flowers at Forest Lawn-Glendale

The Little Church of the Flowers was the first church to be built at Forest Lawn Memorial Park. The architect was T. Patterson Ross. Ross's inspiration was an English village church at Stoke Poges in Buckinghamshire, where the poet Thomas Gray had written "Elegy Written in a Country Churchyard", a famous English poem. Ross wanted to recreate the 600-plus-year-old parish church at Forest Lawn. He began his commission in 1917.

The conservatories adjacent to the pews, filled with flowers, was added later on in the construction. The dedication ceremony took place on Mother's Day, May 12, 1918. At the end of the nave is a Tree of Life Window. The design of the window was created by a long-forgotten monk in an English Abbey. It was then translated into a stained glass medium. The structure also incorporates the Rosemary Chapel, used for cremation services.

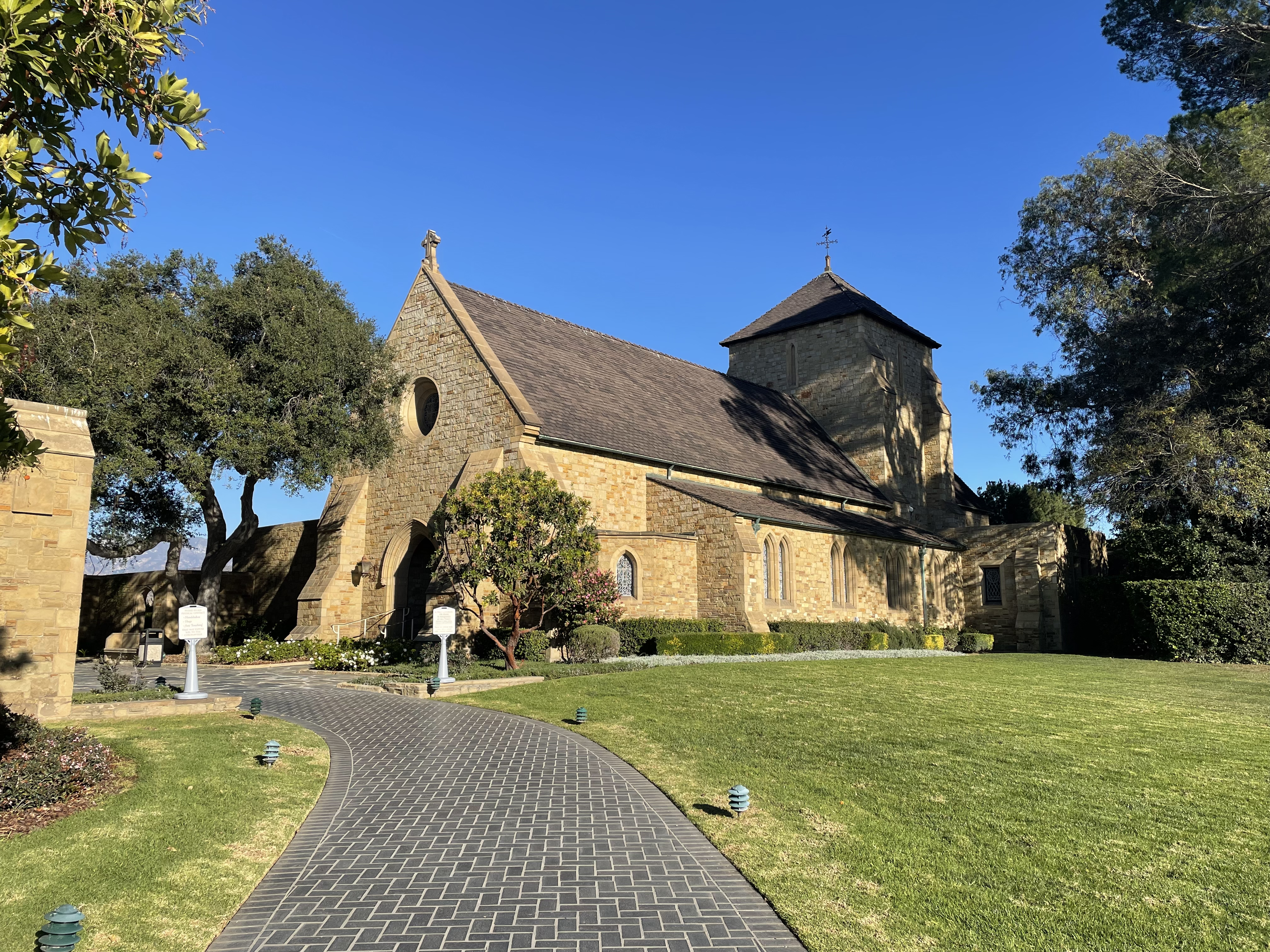
Church of the Recessional at Forest Lawn-Glendale

=== Wee Kirk o' the Heather ===
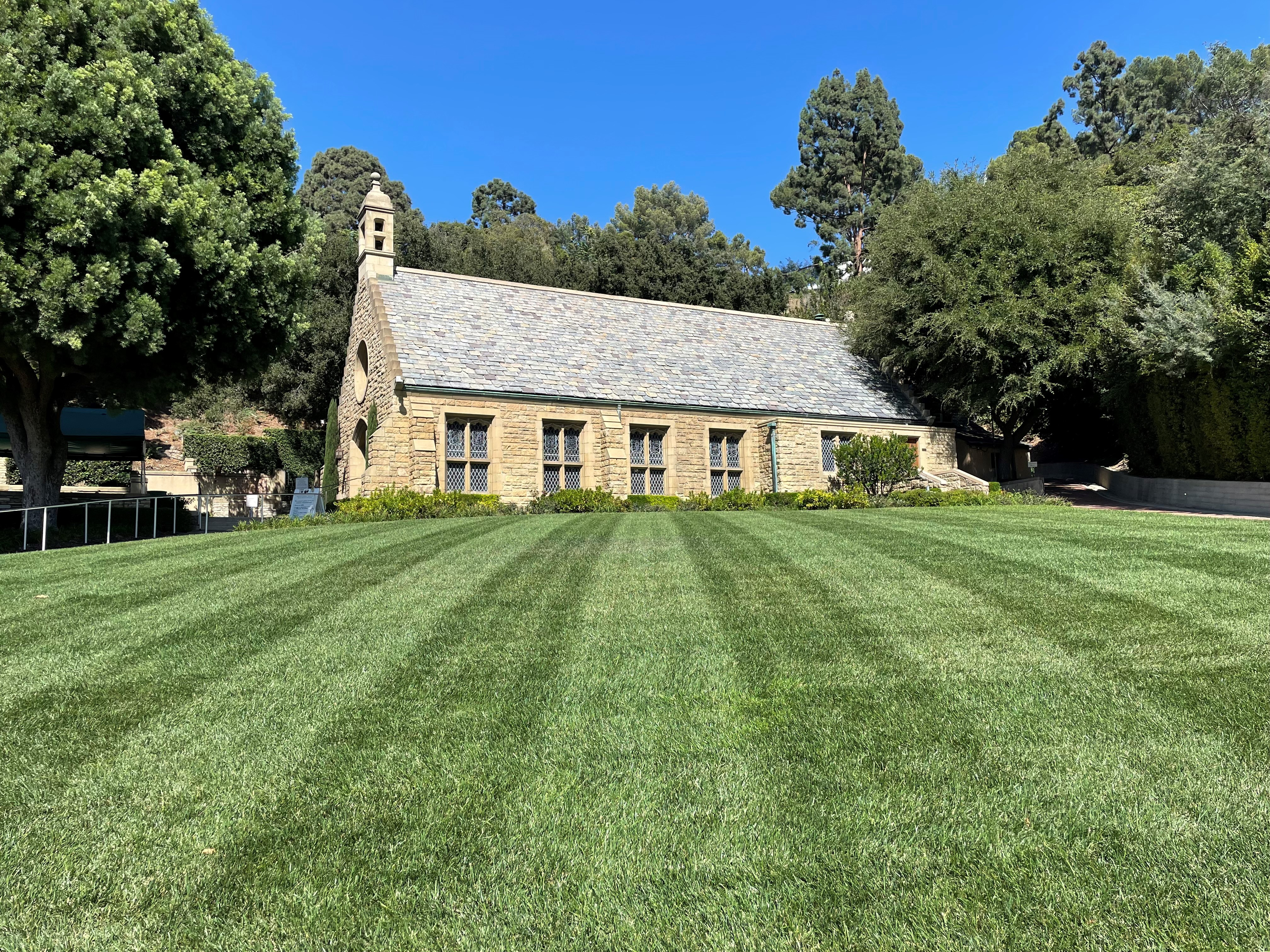
Wee Kirk o' the Heather at Forest Lawn-Glendale

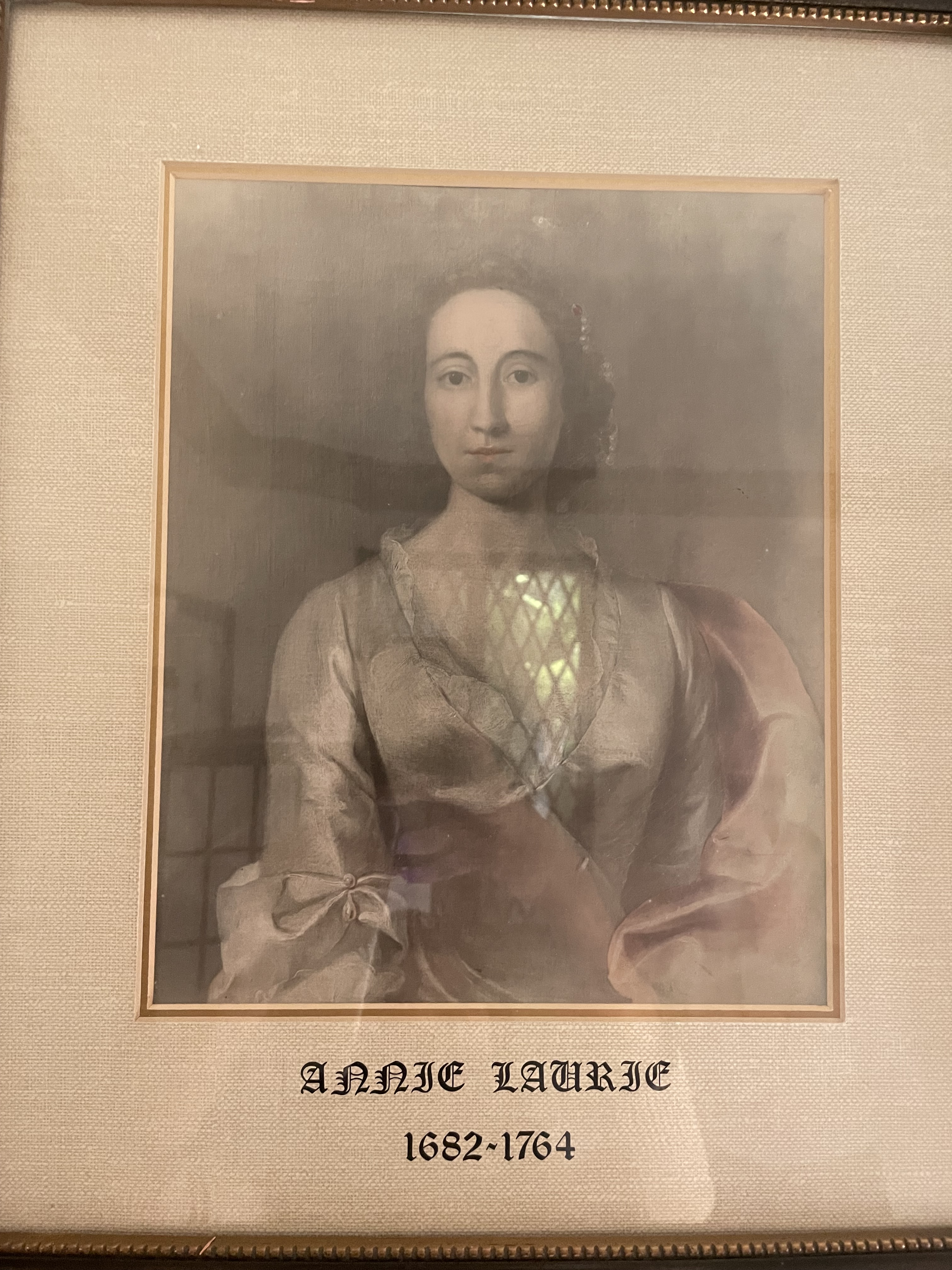
Portrait of Annie Laurie

Wee Kirk o' the Heather is the second church built at Forest Lawn. The inspiration for the church was based on the village church (kirk) at Glencairn, Dumfriesshire, Scotland. This village church was erected in 1310 and subsequently destroyed in 1805. Dumfriesshire is rich in historical tradition, and it is most known for being where Sir Walter Scott wrote some of his most famous works, and former home of the famed poet, Robert Burns. The love song "Annie Laurie" is perhaps Scotland's most popular love ballad. It immortalizes the ill-fated romance of a woman that lived near the original "wee kirk" in the Glencairn.

The song was written by William Douglas of Fingland, a soldier in the Royal Scots Army. Annie Laurie was born at Maxwelton House in 1682, the daughter of Sir Robert Laurie, a baronet. Traditionally, it is believed that Annie's aristocratic family would not consent to her marrying an older soldier of an opposing clan.

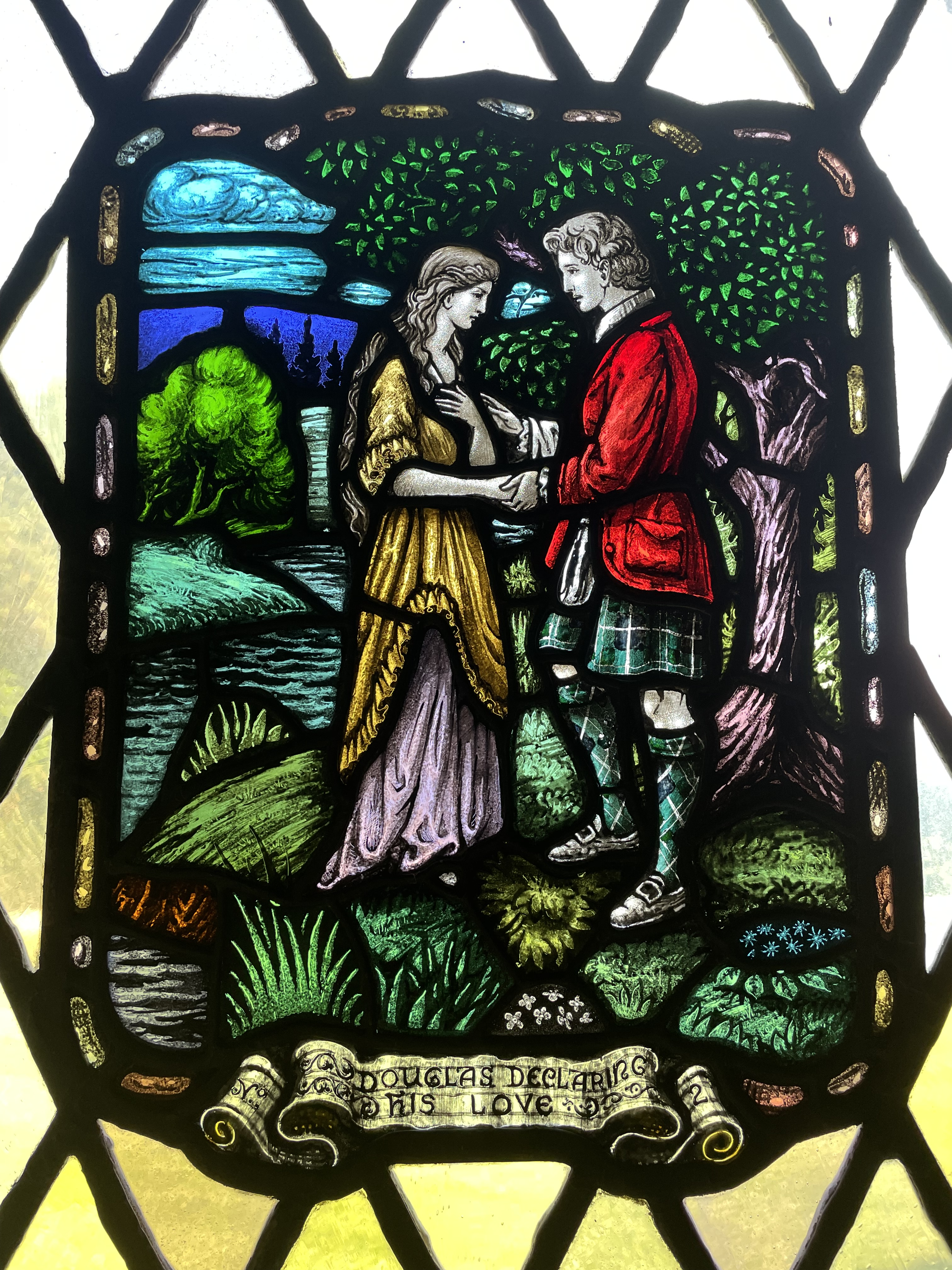
Stained Glass Window in Wee Kirk o' the Heather

This evocative ballad is portrayed in eight stained glass windows along the south side of the Wee Kirk at Forest Lawn. Artifacts related to Annie including communion coins, will, and portrait are all housed in the historical room at the Wee Kirk. The Wee Kirk church was dedicated on October 6, 1929. Over five thousand people attended the ceremony, and Frank McWilliams, Scottish tenor, sang "Annie Laurie."

In the forecourt of the Wee Kirk is a "Wishing Chair." Built in 1931, of stones from the original kirk at Glencairn, Scotland, legend has it that lovers who sit and speak the words inscribed on the chair will be forever blessed.

=== Church of the Recessional ===
The Church of the Recessional was the third church built at Forest Lawn. The architectural inspiration was the Church of St. Margaret in Rottingdean, Sussex, England, an Anglo-Saxon-styled stone and stained glass edifice dating from 1100 A.D. that is still standing. The dedication ceremony took place on November 30, 1941. Within the chancel are three stained glass windows depicting scenes of the Virgin Mary and the Christ Child.

The stained glass windows were produced by Charles J. Connick. Along both sides of the chancel arch, the pulpit and the baptismal font of St. Margaret's have been faithfully reproduced. Over the arch are the words of Apostle Paul, "Now abideth faith, hope, and love, these three; and the greatest of these is love." Along the south side of the church are stained glass windows that depict the Beatitudes from the Sermon on the Mount.

In the forecourt of the church stands the romantic Ring of Aldyth, to which an Old Saxon legend attaches a prophecy of happiness and devotion for a couple who clasp their right hands through the ring and repeat together the inscribed vows: "Thy hand in mine, this ring doth bind, my heart to thine."

== Hall of Crucifixion–Resurrection ==
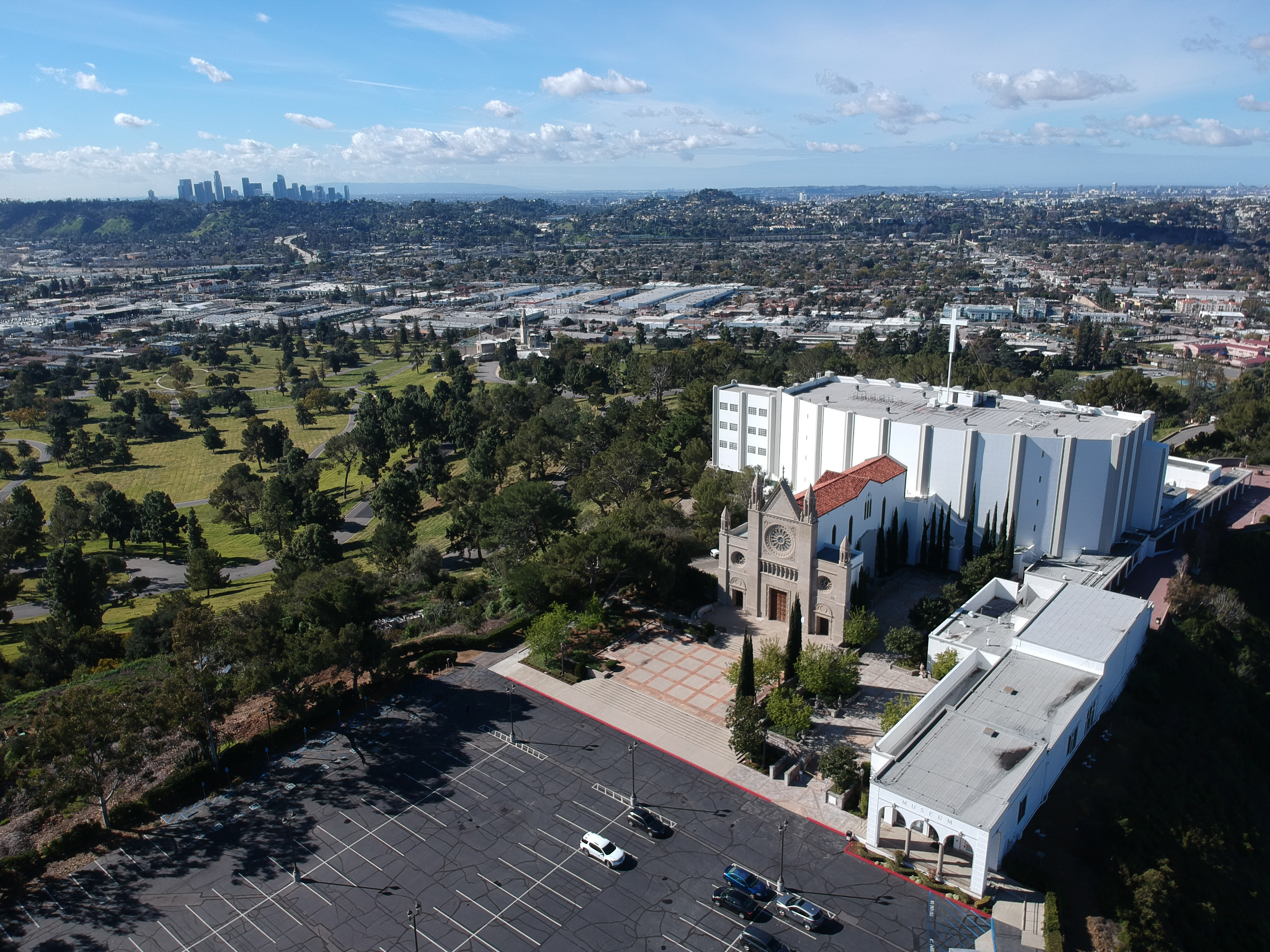
An aerial view of Hall of Crucifixion–Resurrection

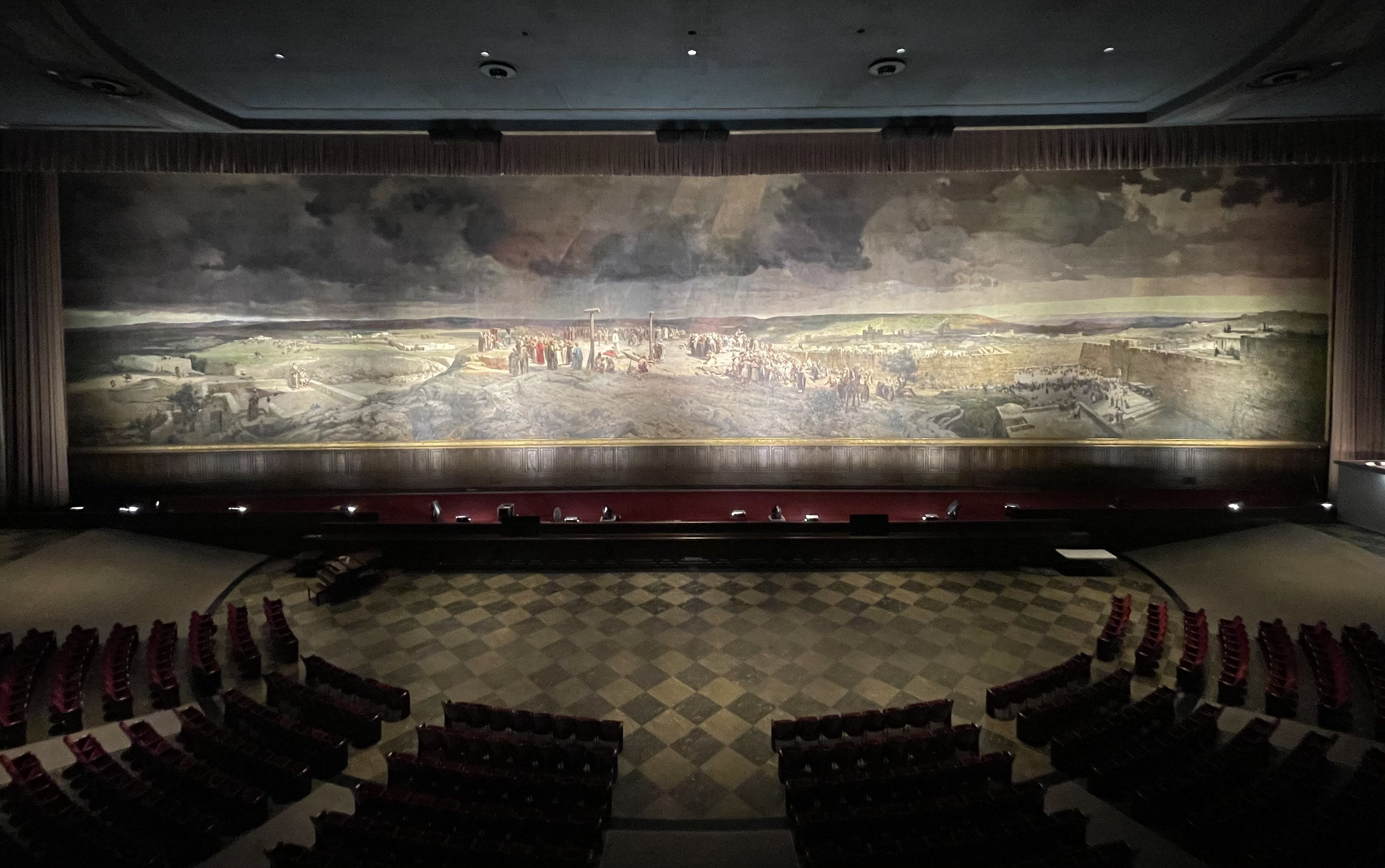
A wide view of Jan Styka's Crucifixion

Built with the intention to house the enormous painting by Jan Styka, The Crucifixion; the design for the Hall of Crucifixion-Resurrection was inspired by the cathedral in Orvieto, Italy. The architectural style of the hall is Gothic. Covering the painting are a pair of gigantic curtains that weigh 3,500 pounds (1,600 kg), measure 400 feet (120 m) long by 50 feet (15 m) high, and are carried on a custom-built set of tracks.

The hall was completed in three years, and the dedication ceremony took place on Good Friday, March 23, 1951.

The painting has an elaborate and interesting history. The Crucifixion was brought by the artist, Jan Styka, to the 1904 World's Fair in St. Louis. When the fair ended, he was unable to pay the export duty and was forced to return to Poland without it. Styka, whose self-portrait is seen in the painting as the figure of Saul (Paul), died in 1925 without ever seeing his painting again. The Crucifixion was wrapped around a telephone pole and stored in several warehouses over the years until it was rediscovered at the Chicago Civic Opera company in 1943. Forest Lawn purchased the painting after World War II for the express purpose of displaying it to the public.

== Critical commentary ==
The most notable critical work about Forest Lawn is The Loved One by Evelyn Waugh, an English writer. Waugh was given a tour of Forest Lawn, which inspired his idea for the book. A 1948 New York Times review wrote that it is "satire at its most ferocious... a macabre frolic filled with... ingenious devices."

The singer Tom Paxton wrote and recorded a satirical song, "Forest Lawn", which featured on his 1970 album Tom Paxton 6 (Elektra Records). The song was also recorded by John Denver for his second album Take Me to Tomorrow.

== Notable interments ==
Forest Lawn is the final resting place of many prominent individuals from the entertainment industry. Individuals such as Joseph Barbera, Joe Besser, Humphrey Bogart, Walt Disney, Larry Fine, Clark Gable, Michael Jackson, Chico Marx, Gummo Marx, and Elizabeth Taylor are all buried or entombed at this cemetery.

== See also ==
- List of cemeteries in the United States
