= Huib Drion =

Dutch Supreme Court judge and law professor

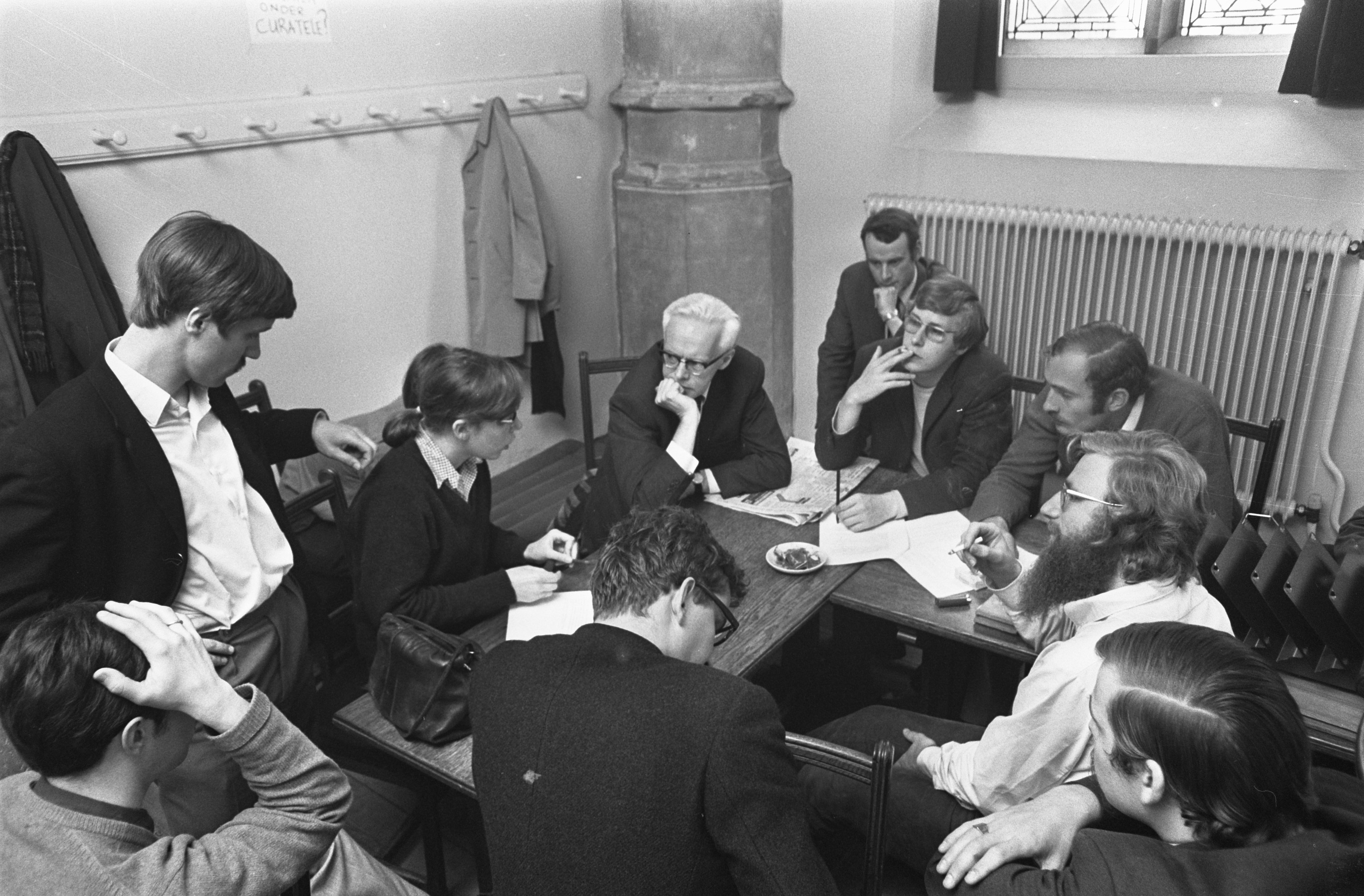
- Drion (centre) and students (Leiden University, 1969)
- Born: 25 April 1917; The Hague (the Netherlands)
- Died: 20 April 2004 (aged 86); Leiden (the Netherlands)
- Known for: Drion's pill
- Scientific career
- Fields: Law

Huib Drion (The Hague, 25 April 1917 – Leiden, 20 April 2004) was a Dutch Supreme Court judge and professor of civil law who became famous for proposing a suicide pill, which was later called Drion's pill after him.

Drion wrote that elderly people who were incurably sick should be able to visit their doctor and receive medication to end their lives. Known in the media as the "Last Wish Pill" or "Drion Pill," the doctor-prescribed drug would be available free of charge to people over the age of 70. Drion also suggested that patients receive a combination of two pills to be ingested in one- or two-day intervals so the patient would have enough time to change his or her mind.

In 1974 he was elected a member of the Royal Netherlands Academy of Arts and Sciences.

== Publications ==
- Limitation of Liability in International Air Law (1954)
- Het conservatieve hart en andere essays (1996)
- Denken zonder diploma (1986)
- Het zelfgewilde einde van oudere mensen (1991)
- Van, over en met Huib Drion (1917–2004) (2005)
