= Sarah Hobart =

Sarah Hobart may refer to:

- Sarah Robinson, Countess of Ripon (1793–1867), née Hobart, wife of F. J. Robinson, 1st Viscount Goderich, prime minister of the United Kingdom
- Sarah Dyer Hobart (1845–1921), American author of poetry, prose, and songs
