= Nocton Hall =

Country house in Nocton, Lincolnshire, England

Coordinates: 53°09′57″N 0°24′49″W

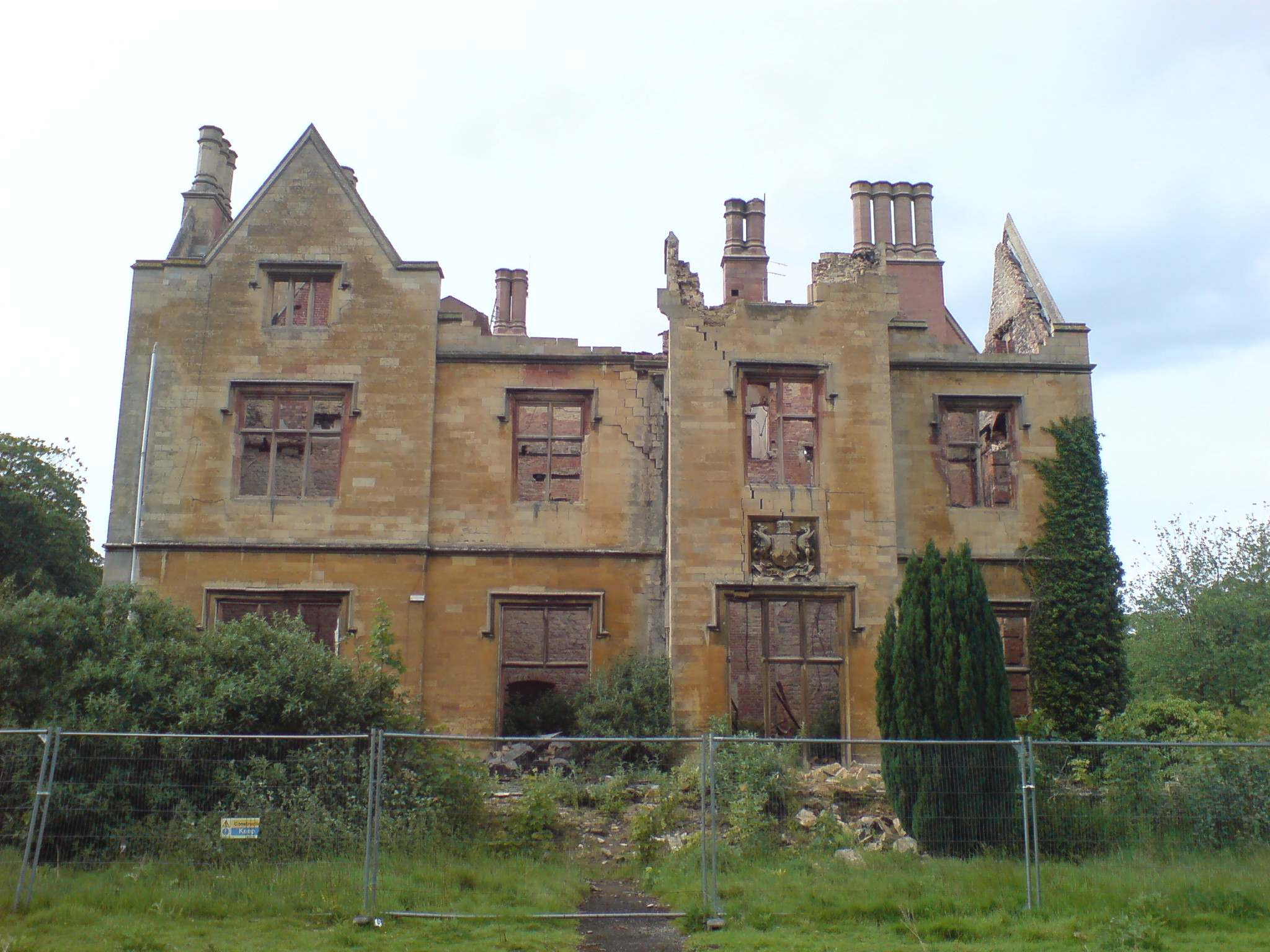
- The remains of Nocton Hall after the fire

General information
- Location: Nocton, Lincolnshire, England
- Construction started: 1834 (second house)
- Client: Robert Hobart (second house)

Nocton Hall is a historic Grade II listed building in the village of Nocton, in Lincolnshire, England. The plaque on the north face of the Hall (see below) indicates that the original building dates back to about 1530 but since then there have been two notable reconstructions. Several prominent people have been residents of the house the most notable being Frederick John Robinson, 1st Earl of Ripon who was Prime Minister of the United Kingdom for a short time.

During the First World War, the house was used as a convalescent home for wounded American Officers. In the Second World War, the British Army used the house, after which it was taken over by the RAF and an extensive hospital developed in the grounds. It reverted to private use in the 1980s. In 2004 there was a major fire that left the building in a derelict state. Options are currently being considered regarding the future of the building.

== Early history ==
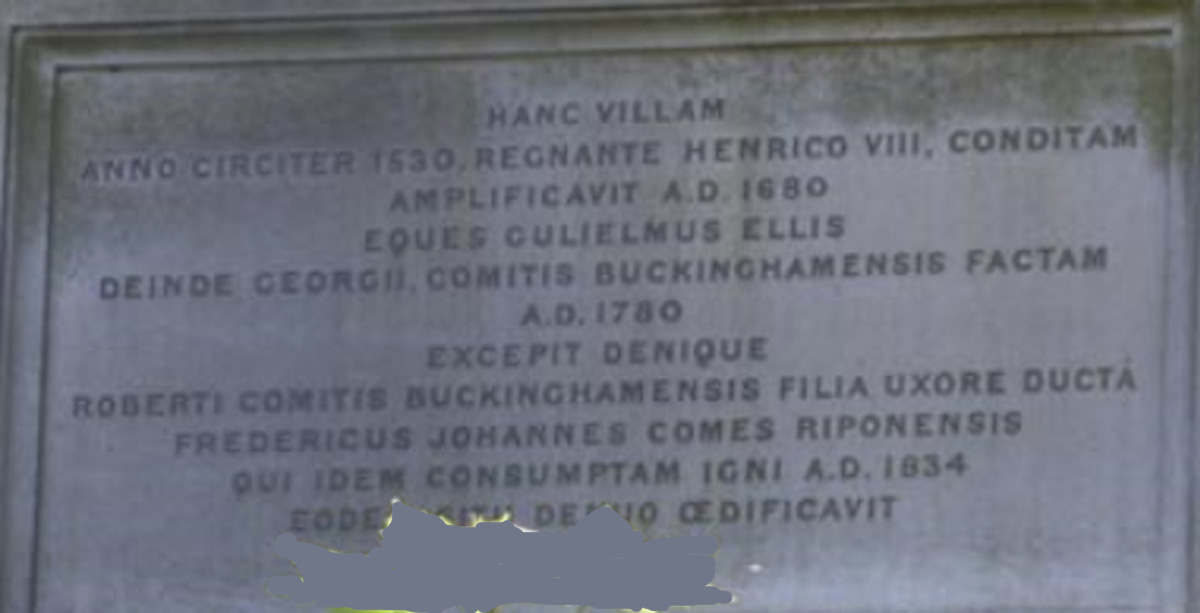
Plaque near front door of Nocton Hall describing its history

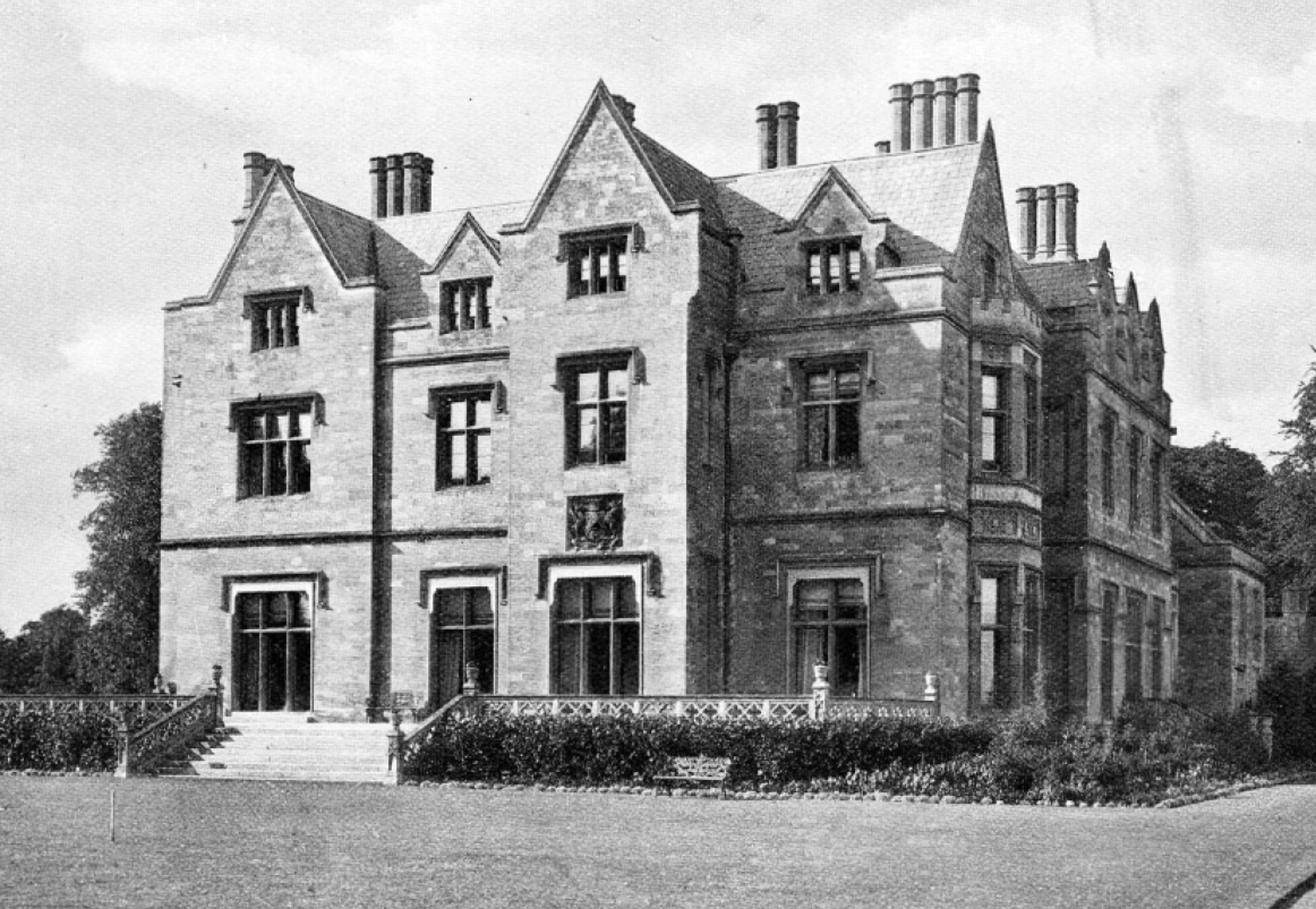
Nocton Hall in 1901

The historic grounds upon which Nocton Hall stands previously contained both a house and priory. Nocton Priory was built in the 12th century and the house was constructed in the 16th century and coexisted with the priory. The remains of the priory still exist as earthworks and are located at least 0.6 miles (1 km) from the house. The house was called Nocton Manor and was the property of Thomas Wimbishe and subsequently the Towneley family. In the 1670s while Nocton belonged to Sir Charles Stanhope, his niece Elizabeth Delavel Livingston put on a performance of Il pastor fido for 300 people, an important example of country house drama performed by amateurs for a large audience.

This house was reconstructed by Sir William Ellis in the latter part of the 17th century by extending parts of the existing Towneley manor and was called Nocton Old Hall. In 1834 Nocton Old Hall was engulfed by fire and the current building was erected in 1841 by the 1st Earl of Ripon.

In 1996 before the recent fire, an examination of the house was made and some evidence was found that the 1841 building contained some parts of Nocton Old Hall. There is a plaque on the northern elevation of the building, near the front door (shown on the right) which indicates that the Earl and Countess of Ripon who reconstructed the current building in 1841 believed that it was founded in about 1530. The inscription is in Latin, but reads in translation:

This house was founded in about 1530 during the reign of Henry VIII. Enlarged in 1680 by Sir William Ellis. Then George Buckingham finally received it in 1780. Robert Earl of Buckingham's daughter married Frederick John, Earl of Ripon. Fire destroyed the house in about 1830 and another was built in the same place in 1841.

Nocton Hall, then the property of Thomas Wimbishe, was visited by Henry VIII and Catherine Howard in 1541 during the King's northern progress. Henry's fifth wife, Catherine, reputedly planted the great chestnut tree in the grounds at Nocton on 13 October 1541. The tree still stands today.

== Frederick and Sarah Robinson, 1st Earl and Countess of Ripon ==
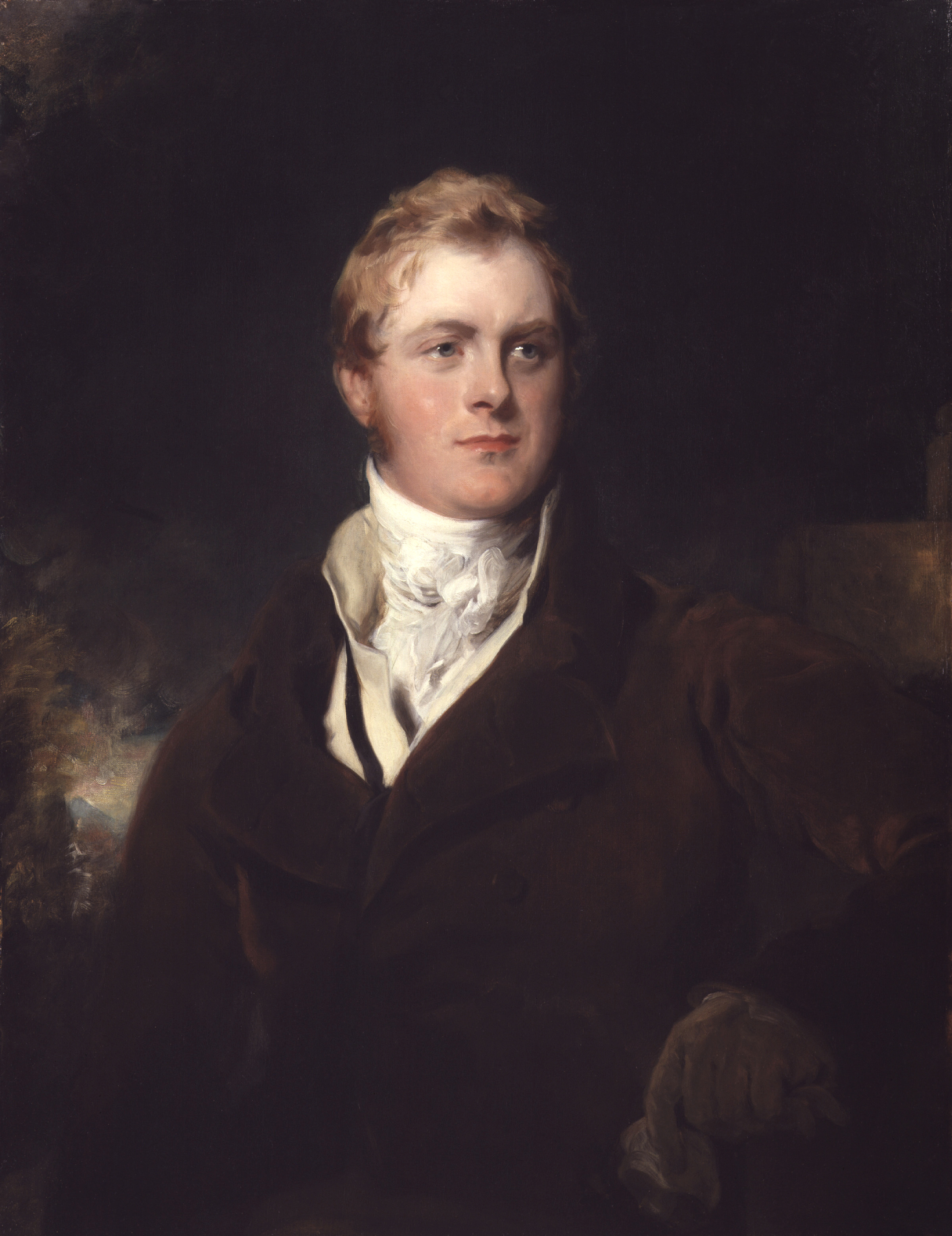
Portrait of Frederick Robinson by Thomas Lawrence, 1824.

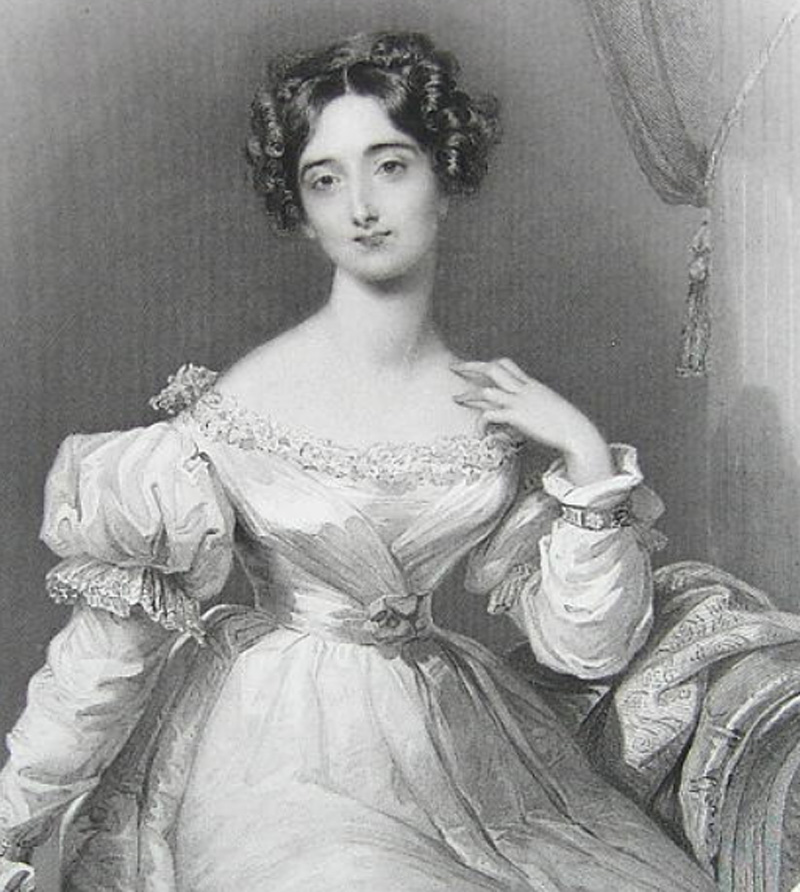
Sarah Robinson, Countess of Ripon

Frederick John Robinson was born in 1782. His parents were Thomas Robinson, 2nd Baron Grantham and Lady Mary, daughter of the 2nd Earl of Hardwicke. He was educated at Harrow and Cambridge University and was regarded as a very bright student.

Sarah, his wife was born in 1793 and was eleven years his junior. She was the only child of Robert Hobart, 4th Earl of Buckinghamshire who owned Nocton Old Hall. On his death in 1816 she inherited his property.

Frederick became Tory M.P. for Carlow borough in 1806 and for Ripon in 1807–27. He was secretary of state for the colonies in 1809, Lord of the Admiralty 1810–12, Privy Councillor in 1812, a Lord of the Treasury in 1812, Paymaster-General of the forces in 1812–17, and Chancellor of the Exchequer in 1823–27. In 1827 he became Prime Minister after the death of Canning. He was appointed by the King who thought that because of his previous experience and competent performance he would be suitable. However, this was not the case and only five months later with his Government in chaos, he was asked to resign.

History has judged Frederick harshly because of this episode but there were very severe pressures on him at the time. There was a high level of discord between members of his own party which he found difficult to control. There was also a great deal of domestic pressure on him at the time which he found unbearable. His wife Sarah had proved to be an unsuitable partner for a high-ranking politician as she was prone to outburst of hysteria and hypochondria. There exist letters written by Sarah's step aunt Emily Eden which frequently describes her niece's strange behaviour. In 1826 she said:

I will not say anything about Sarah; she is too bad if she knows what she is about. Poor Mr. Robinson (Frederick) was summoned back from Wrest Park yesterday, where he had been amusing himself for three days. She sent him word she was dying, and when he arrived in the greatest haste yesterday, she was gone out airing. He was very cross, but too late.

The aunt also felt that Frederick had a nervous disposition and was completely dominated by the hysterical behaviour of his wife. It is these character traits that may have made him such an unsuitable Prime Minister even though he was a competent politician in lower offices. After he resigned as Prime Minister, one of his colleagues remarked that he was "quite another man who sleeps at nights now, and laughs and talks as usual".

The couple had only one child who survived to adulthood. This was George Frederick Samuel Robinson, 1st Marquess of Ripon. On Frederick's death in 1859 he inherited Nocton Hall.

== George and Henrietta Robinson, 1st Marquess and Marchioness of Ripon ==
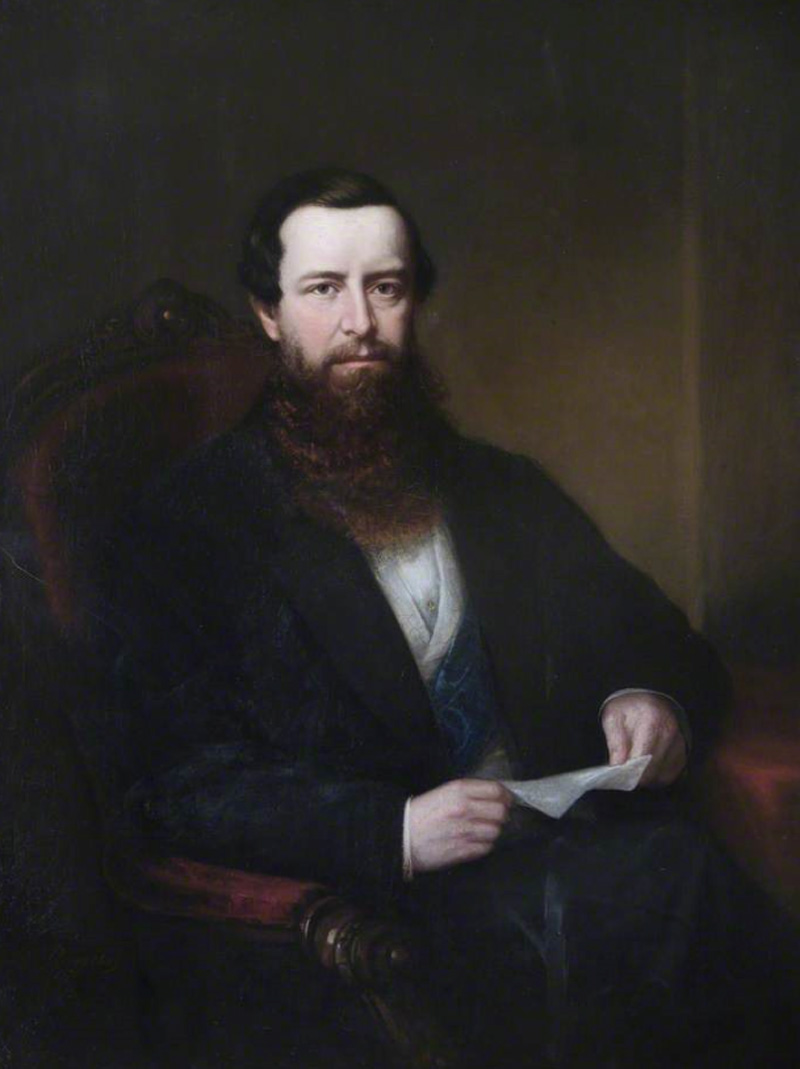
George Robinson, 1st Marquess of Ripon

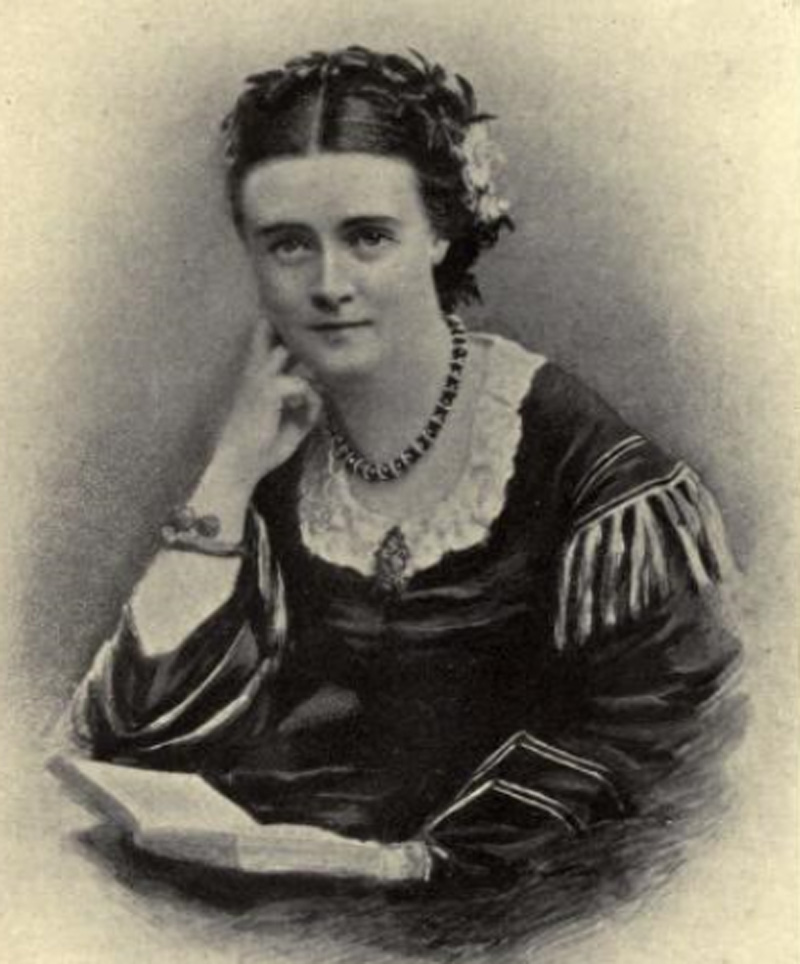
Henrietta, 1st Marchioness of Ripon

George Frederick Samuel Robinson was born in 1827 in 10 Downing Street when his father was Prime Minister. A large part of his childhood was spent at Nocton Hall where he obtained much of his education. He was a prolific reader which helped him obtain the knowledge he required.

In 1851 he married Henrietta Vyner who was his first cousin once removed. Henrietta was the daughter of Captain Henry Vyner of Newby Hall near Ripon. In 1859 after his father's death he succeeded the title of Earl of Ripon. In November of the same year, he gained the title of his uncle, Earl de Grey as his uncle had no male heirs. He also inherited from Earl de Grey his ancestral home of Studley Royal in Yorkshire. He was undersecretary for war in 1859–61 and for India in 1861–63. He became Prime Minister Lord Palmerston's secretary for war in 1863, and in 1866 was appointed secretary of state for India.

One of his most important position was as Viceroy of India in 1880 where he is said to have introduced liberal reforms. According to one historical account: “He lit the torch that led ultimately to the political autonomy of the country". According to the Quarterly Review Ripon had industriously scattered the germs of independence in India with the doctrine that "the natives were entitled to rule, the English nothing more than interlopers; the time had arrived when India was entitled to ‘Home Rule’.

After he returned from India he spent more of his time at his other home Studley Royal and he decided to sell Nocton Hall in 1889. The buyer was a close friend of his George Hodgson, a very wealthy industrialist.

== Residents of Nocton Hall after the Robinsons ==
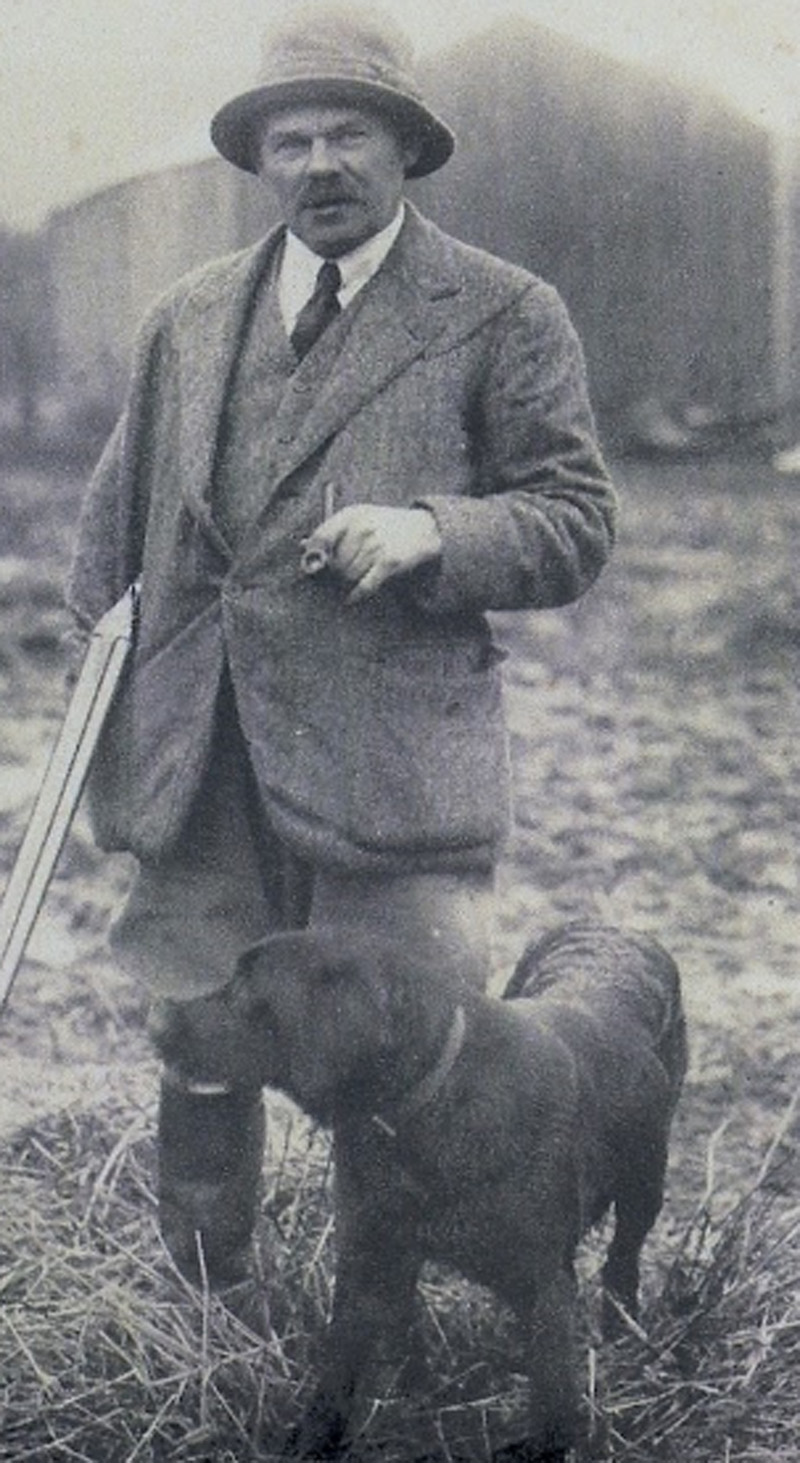
James Herbert Dennis circa 1920

George Hodgson, a wealthy spinner from Bradford moved into the Hall in 1889 and remained there until his death in 1895. His son John inherited the property and in 1902 upon John's death, his grandson Norman took control of the Estate.

In 1917 after the United States' entry into the War the Hodgson family moved into Embsay House in the village so that the Hall could be turned into a convalescent home for American officers wounded in the War. The last of these officers left in 1919.

In 1919 the Hall was sold to William Dennis of the firm Messrs W.H. Dennis and Sons, Kirton. On his death in 1925 his son James Herbert Dennis came to live at the property. James was a farmer and he converted a large part of the Estate to growing potatoes. He even had a special steam locomotive manufactured for the haulage of his potatoes.

In 1940 with the outbreak of the Second World War it was taken over by the Army and was the home of 21st Casualty Clearing Station (CCS) Royal Army Medical Corps including its Chaplain Training Centre, until it was deployed in North Africa in June 1942. Some time after this, it was taken over by the Air Ministry, the Hall and grounds remaining as the site of RAF Hospital Nocton Hall until its closure in 1983.

In the mid-1980s Torrie Richardson bought Nocton Hall, the surrounding wood, woodland, grassland, and cottages. Selling the cottages for redevelopment allowed him to develop Nocton Hall as a Residential Home. Nocton Hall Residential home ran a summer fête for the village on their lawn and employed many local people. Torrie's son, Gary, took control of the business in the early 1990s. The home ran into difficulty and closed in the mid-1990s, and was sold by the receivers to new owners, Leda Properties of Oxford. Leda also bought the RAF Hospital site from the Ministry of Defence.

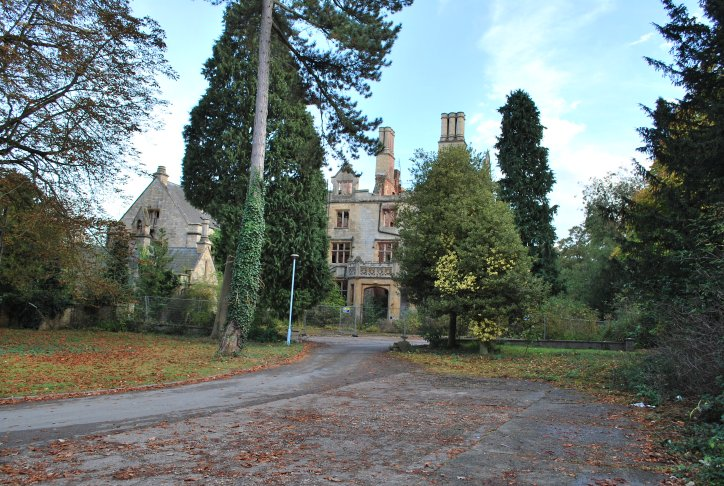
The North aspect of Nocton Hall – October 2009

While vacant there were many break-ins; fireplaces and the stair bannisters were stolen. It burnt down for a second time in the early hours of 24 October 2004, the fire reducing it to a shell. The investigation into the fire established that multiple fires had been set, but to date, no one has been charged with arson. Due to the extensive structural damage, it will now likely need to be rebuilt if the site is not redeveloped for another purpose. An adjacent geriatric nursing care two-storey building has also been severely damaged by vandals since it was left vacant.

In October 2009 Nocton Hall was included in the Victorian Society's list of the top ten endangered buildings in England and Wales. An investigation for BBC Look North established that Leda Properties intended to put forward new development plans in "the near future" for both the Hall and its associated gardens. As the Hall is Grade II listed and retains its major structural integrity the Society argued there was still a viable future for the building.

== Legacy ==
The local Nocton Social Club has been in continuous existence since 1946, incorporated within various generations of Nocton village halls. In 2020, the most recent Village Hall was rebuilt Nocton Hub and the decision was made to re-brand the Nocton Social Club as a Community Pub, named the Ripon Arms, after the 1st Earl of Ripon. The logo of the Ripon Arms, uses a stylised version of the 1st Earl's coat of arms and maintains the heritage link back to the Ripon's of Nocton Hall.

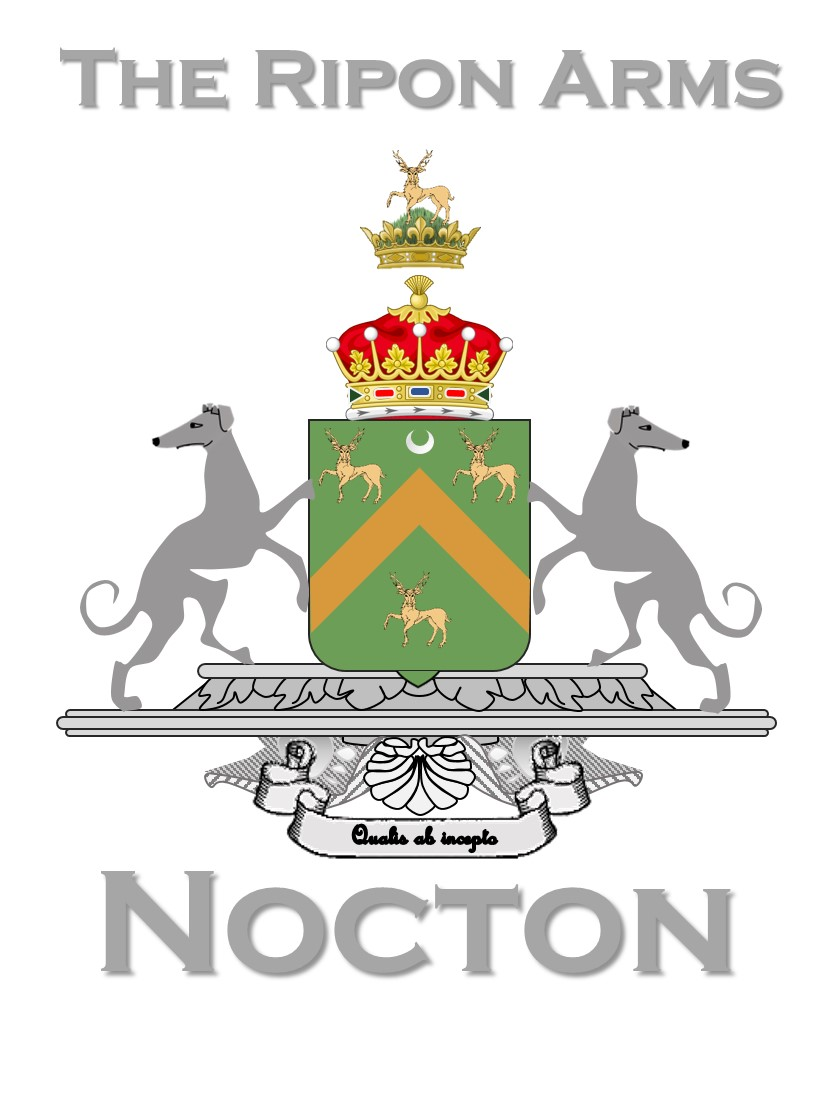
Pub sign of the Ripon Arms Nocton, a Community Interest Company Pub that has a heritage link to the Earl of Ripon who owned Nocton Hall
