= RAF Hospital Nocton Hall =

Former military hospital in England

RAF Hospital Nocton Hall
- Nocton, Lincolnshire in England

Site information
- Type: Military hospital
- Owner: Ministry of Defence (MOD)
- Operator: Royal Air Force (1947–1983); US Air Force (1983–1995)
- Condition: Closed

Location
- Location within Lincolnshire
- Coordinates: 53°09′56″N 0°24′48″W

Site history
- Built: 1943
- In use: 1995
- Fate: Sold by MOD and converted to residential care home, later became derelict.

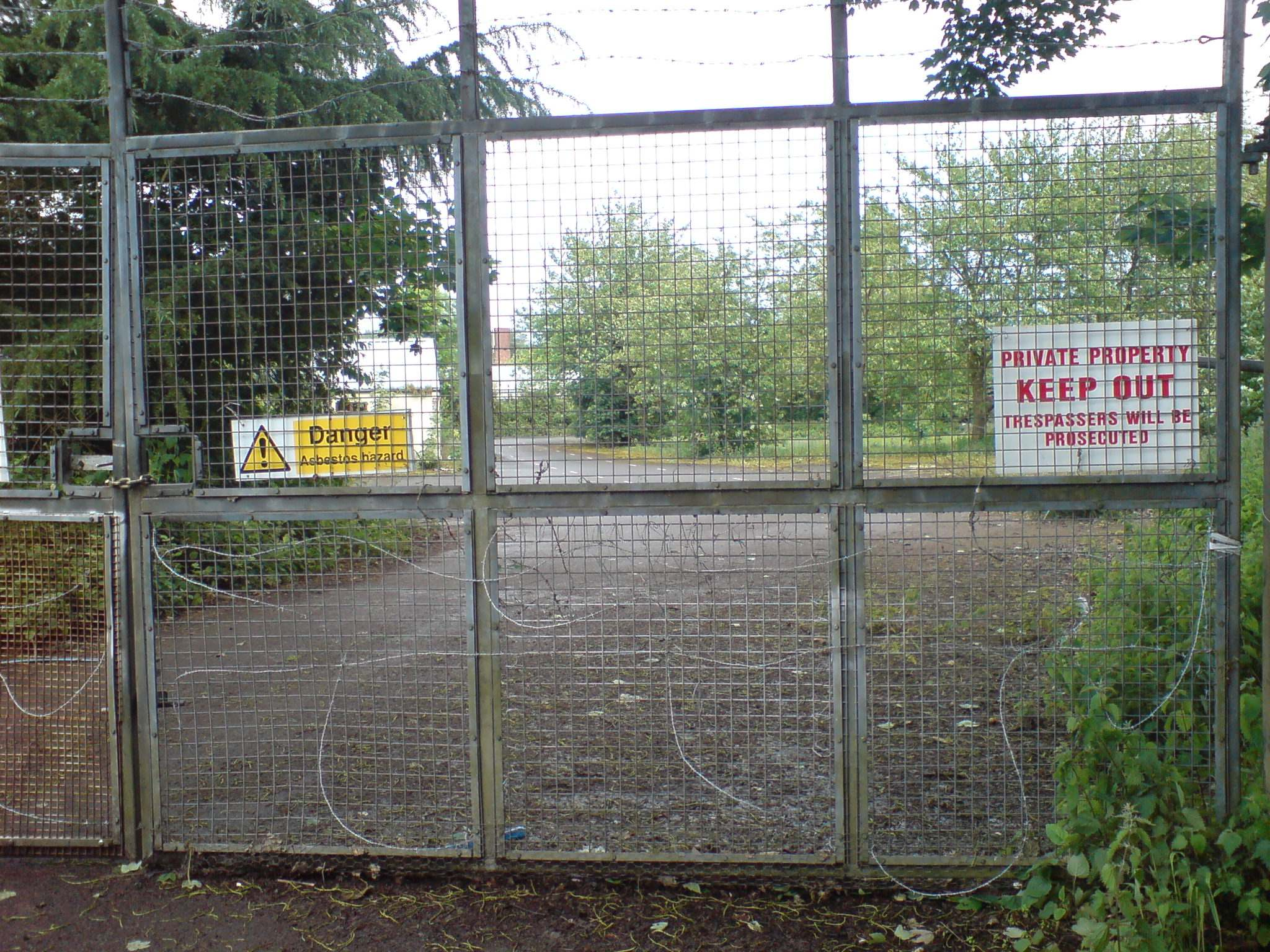
The old RAF Nocton Hall site

RAF Hospital Nocton Hall was a 740-bed RAF hospital in Nocton, Lincolnshire serving the predominantly RAF personnel based at the large number of RAF Stations in the area.

== History ==
Officially designated as No. 1 RAF Hospital Nocton Hall, the facility opened for medical use in June 1947.

The hospital was situated in the grounds of Nocton Hall which was used to provide accommodation for female officers. The hospital was used by forces personnel, their families and local civilians until it closed as an RAF facility on 31 March 1983.

In 1984 it was leased to the United States Air Force (USAF) for use as a wartime contingency hospital. During the Gulf War, over 1,300 US medical staff were sent to the hall and many were billeted at RAF Scampton, RAF Cranwell, and RAF Digby. Ultimately only 35 casualties had to be treated. In its later days 13 American personnel remained to keep the hospital serviceable. The USAF handed back RAF Nocton Hall to the UK Government on 30 September 1995.

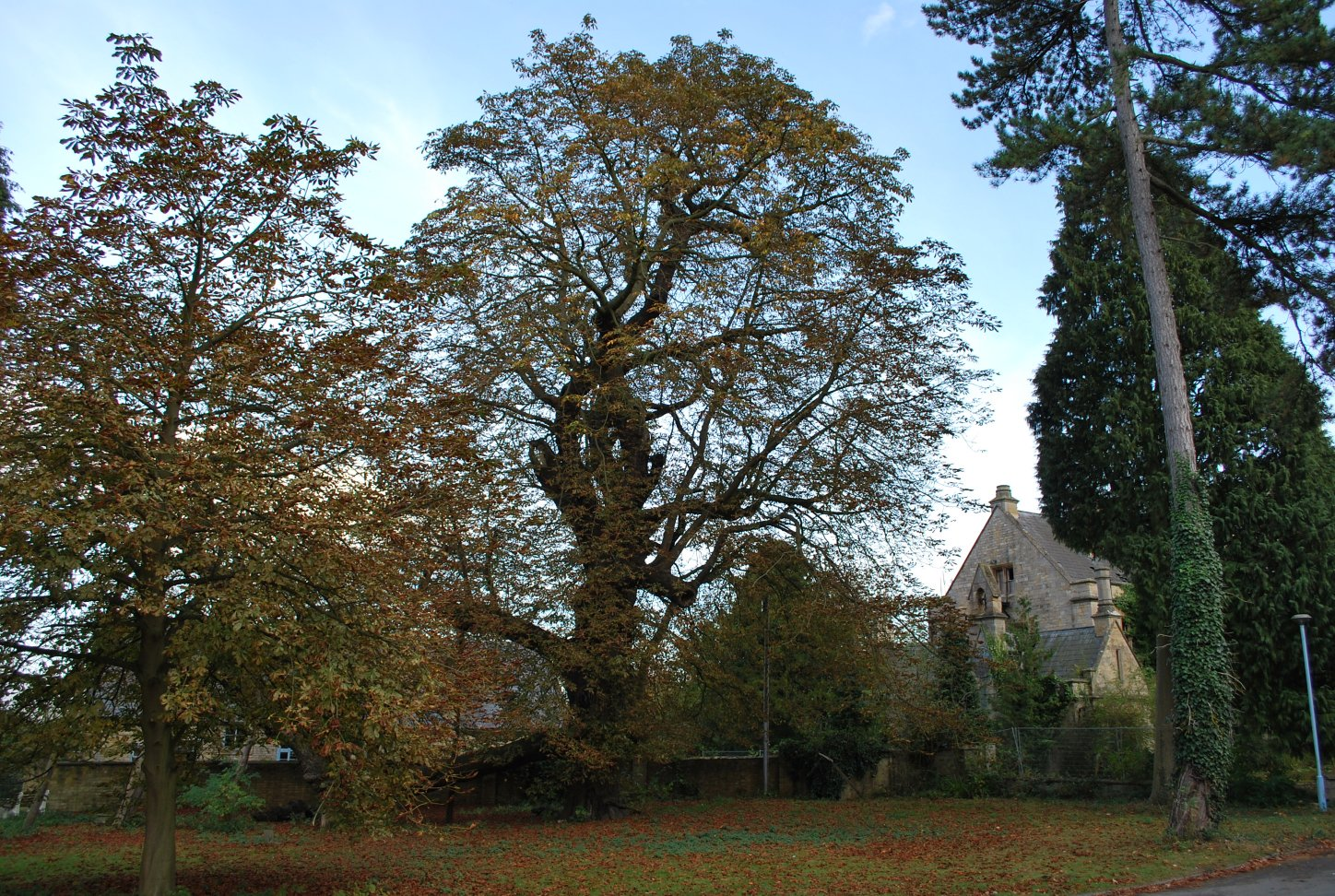
The Nocton Hall Chestnut tree - October 2009

The only accessible part of the hospital is the site of the former married quarters, which had been built nearby.
