= George Robinson, 1st Marquess of Ripon =

British politician (1827–1909)

His Excellency The Most Honourable The Marquess of Ripon KG GCSI CIE VD PC
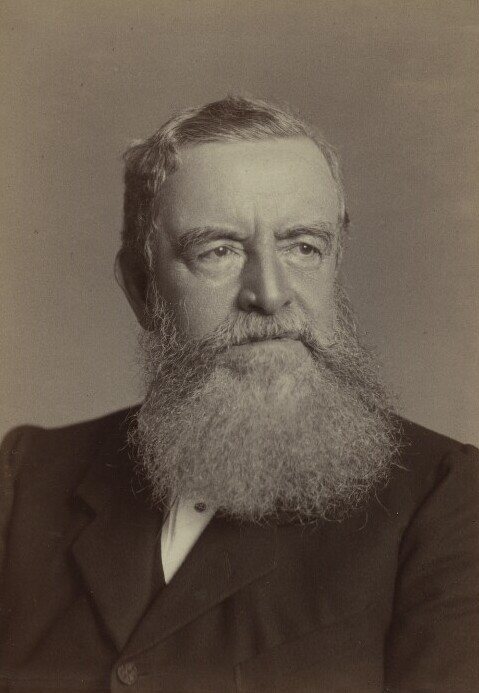
- Ripon in the 1890s

Viceroy and Governor-General of India
- In office 8 June 1880 – 13 December 1884
- Monarch: Victoria
- Preceded by: The Lord Lytton
- Succeeded by: The Earl of Dufferin

Leader of the House of Lords Lord Keeper of the Privy Seal
- In office 10 December 1905 – 14 April 1908
- Monarch: Edward VII
- Prime Minister: Sir Henry Campbell-Bannerman
- Preceded by: The Marquess of Lansdowne (Leader of Lords); The Marquess of Salisbury (Lord Privy Seal)
- Succeeded by: The Earl of Crewe

Secretary of State for the Colonies
- In office 18 August 1892 – 21 June 1895
- Monarch: Victoria
- Prime Minister: William Ewart Gladstone; The Earl of Rosebery
- Preceded by: The Lord Knutsford
- Succeeded by: Joseph Chamberlain

First Lord of the Admiralty
- In office 1 February 1886 – 20 July 1886
- Monarch: Victoria
- Prime Minister: William Ewart Gladstone
- Preceded by: Lord George Hamilton
- Succeeded by: Lord George Hamilton

Lord President of the Council
- In office 9 December 1868 – 9 August 1873
- Monarch: Victoria
- Prime Minister: William Ewart Gladstone
- Preceded by: The Duke of Marlborough
- Succeeded by: Henry Bruce

Secretary of State for India
- In office 16 February 1866 – 26 June 1866
- Monarch: Victoria
- Prime Minister: The Earl Russell
- Preceded by: Charles Wood
- Succeeded by: Viscount Cranborne

Secretary of State for War
- In office 28 April 1863 – 16 February 1866
- Monarch: Victoria
- Prime Minister: Lord Palmerston; The Earl Russell
- Preceded by: Sir George Cornewall Lewis, Bt
- Succeeded by: Marquess of Hartington

Parliamentary Under-Secretary of State for India
- In office 21 January 1861 – 31 July 1861
- Monarch: Victoria
- Prime Minister: Lord Palmerston
- Preceded by: Hon. Thomas Baring
- Succeeded by: Hon. Thomas Baring

Parliamentary Under-Secretary of State for War
- In office 18 June 1859 – 21 January 1861
- Monarch: Victoria
- Prime Minister: Lord Palmerston
- Preceded by: The Earl of Rosslyn
- Succeeded by: Hon. Thomas Baring
- In office 31 July 1861 – 28 April 1863
- Monarch: Victoria
- Prime Minister: Lord Palmerston
- Preceded by: Hon. Thomas Baring
- Succeeded by: Marquess of Hartington

Member of the House of Lords Lord Temporal
- In office 28 January 1859 – 9 July 1909; Hereditary Peerage
- Preceded by: The 1st Earl of Ripon
- Succeeded by: The 2nd Marquess of Ripon

Member of Parliament for West Riding of Yorkshire
- In office 24 April 1857 – 28 January 1859
- Preceded by: Richard Cobden
- Succeeded by: John William Ramsden

Member of Parliament for Huddersfield
- In office 22 April 1853 – 24 April 1857
- Preceded by: William Crompton-Stansfield
- Succeeded by: Edward Akroyd

Member of Parliament for Kingston upon Hull
- In office 31 July 1852 – March 1853
- Preceded by: Matthew Talbot Baines
- Succeeded by: William Digby Seymour

Personal details
- Born: 24 October 1827 10 Downing Street, London
- Died: 9 July 1909 (aged 81) Studley Royal Park, West Riding of Yorkshire
- Party: Liberal
- Spouse: Henrietta Vyner (m. 1851; died 1907)
- Children: Oliver; Mary
- Parents: F. J. Robinson, 1st Earl of Ripon (father); Lady Sarah Hobart (mother)

George Frederick Samuel Robinson, 1st Marquess of Ripon, KG, GCSI, CIE, VD, PC (24 October 1827 – 9 July 1909), styled Viscount Goderich from 1833 to 1859 and as Earl de Grey and Ripon from 1859 to 1871, was a British politician and Viceroy and Governor General of India who served in every Liberal cabinet between 1861 and 1908.

== Background and education ==
Ripon was born at 10 Downing Street, London, the second son of Prime Minister F. J. Robinson, 1st Viscount Goderich (who was created Earl of Ripon in 1833), by his wife Lady Sarah (née Hobart), daughter of the Earl of Buckinghamshire. He was educated privately, attending neither school nor college.

He was awarded the honorary degree of DCL by the University of Oxford in 1870.

== Diplomatic and political career, 1852–1880 ==
Ripon served on his uncle Sir Henry Ellis' British special mission to the Brussels Conference on the affairs of Italy in 1848–49. Although his father had been a Tory, Ripon was first a Whig and later a Liberal. He entered the House of Commons as one of the two members for Hull in 1852. Both he and his party colleague James Clay were unseated in 1853 by petition over claims of widespread corruption in their election, of which they were exonerated of any knowledge. He was returned for Huddersfield later in 1853 and for the West Riding of Yorkshire in 1857.

In 1859 he succeeded his father as second Earl of Ripon, taking his seat in the House of Lords, and later that year succeeded his uncle in the more senior title of Earl de Grey, becoming known as the Earl de Grey and Ripon. He was Under-Secretary of State for War under Lord Palmerston between 1859 and 1861 and again from 1861 to 1863, and briefly Under-Secretary of State for India in 1861. In 1863 he was made a Privy Counsellor and Secretary of State for War under Palmerston, with a seat in the Cabinet. He retained this office when Lord Russell became prime minister on Palmerston's death in 1865, and then served under Russell as Secretary of State for India between February and June 1866. In Gladstone's first administration he was Lord President of the Council (1868–1873). During this period he acted as chairman of the joint commission for drawing up the Treaty of Washington with the United States over the Alabama Claims. For this, in 1871 he was created Marquess of Ripon, in the County of York. He had already been made a Knight of the Order of the Garter in 1869. In 1878 he served as President of the first day of the Co-operative Congress.

== Viceroy of India, 1880–1884 ==
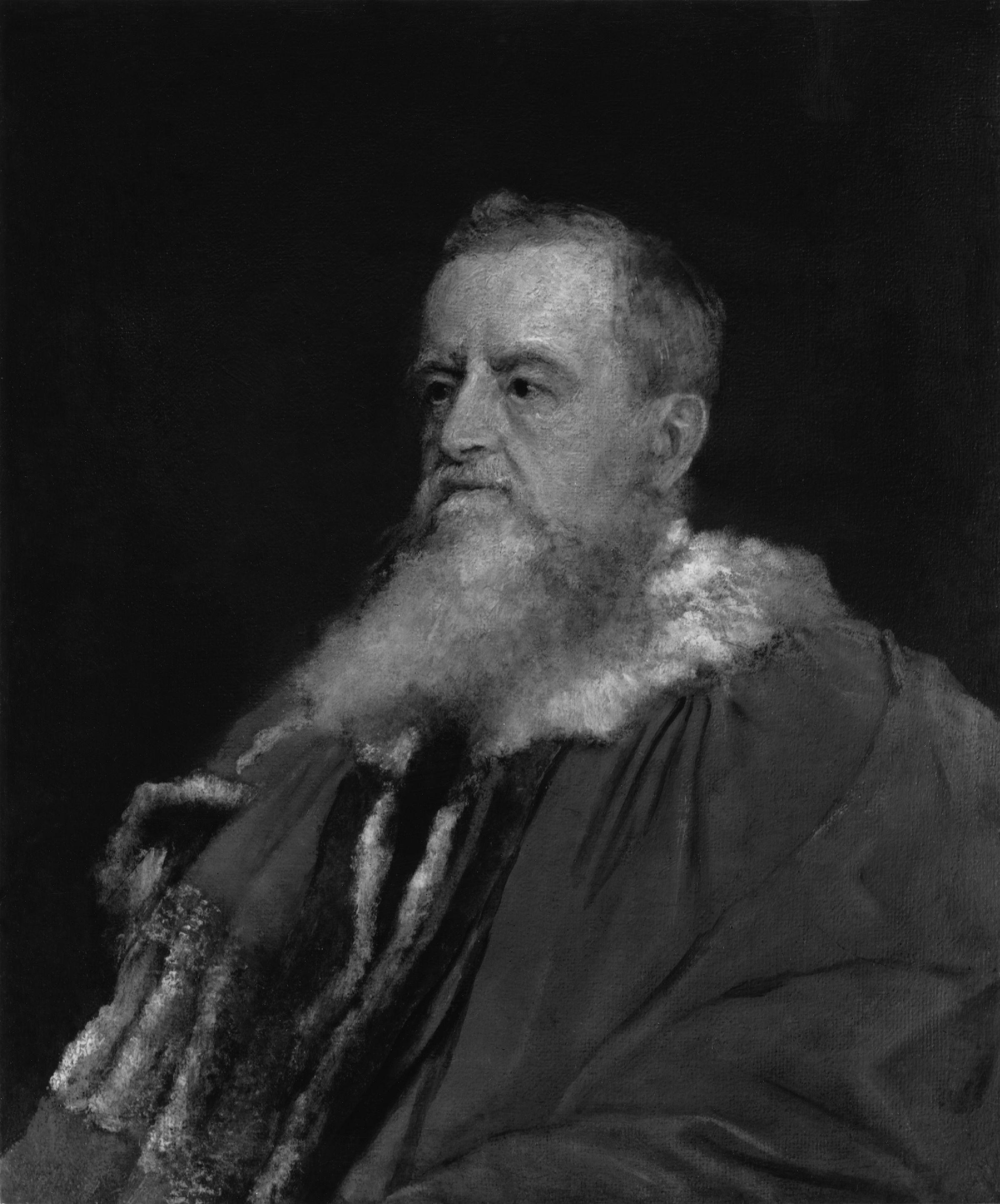
Lord Ripon by George Frederic Watts

When Gladstone returned to power in 1880 he appointed Ripon Viceroy of India, an office he held until 1884. During his time in India, Ripon introduced legislation (the Ilbert Bill, named for the legal member of the Viceroy's Executive Council, Courtenay Ilbert) that would have granted Indians more legal rights, including the right of Indian judges to judge Europeans in court. Though progressive in its intent, the legislation was scuppered by Europeans living in India who did not want to be tried by a native judge. In this Ripon was supported by Florence Nightingale, who also backed his efforts to obtain a Bengal land tenancy bill (eventually the Bengal Tenancy Act 1885) that would improve the situation of the peasants. In 1882 he repealed the controversial Vernacular Press Act 1878 passed by Lytton. He also promoted the Indian Famine Codes.

He was also instrumental in supporting Dietrich Brandis to reorganize the Madras Forest Department and expand systematic forest conservancy in India. In 1883, Lord Ripon joined a shooting party organised by the Maharaja of Darbhanga which had a total bag of 1683, including 4 tigers, 47 buffaloes, 280 pigs and 467 deer. (The remainder was ″small game″.) There was some criticism at ″... such wholesale destruction, particularly as it happens to be the breeding season.″

He is still remembered in Chennai (formerly Madras), India with a Tamil saying in rhyme "Lord Ripon engal appan" meaning: Lord Ripon, our father. The Corporation of Chennai's Ripon Building was named for him, as well as the town of Riponpet in the Shivamogga district in the state of Karnataka. In Calcutta, Ripon Street was named for him. The Ghanta Ghar Multan or Clock Tower of Multan in Pakistan was named Ripon Building and the hall of the same building was named Ripon Hall. The Ripon Club in Mumbai (formerly Bombay) founded in 1884 by the Parsis for their community members, was named after him.

== Political career, 1884–1908 ==
Lord Ripon also became a supporter of Home Rule for Ireland. In Gladstone's 1886 government he was First Lord of the Admiralty, and in the government of 1892 to 1895 he was Secretary of State for the Colonies. When the Liberals again returned to power in 1905 under Sir Henry Campbell-Bannerman, he took office, aged 78, as Lord Privy Seal and Leader of the House of Lords. In 1908, he declined to remain as Lords leader when H. H. Asquith became Prime Minister in April, and he resigned as Lord Privy Seal in October.

As noted by Neil Smith, Ripon's liberalism had roots in the mid-nineteenth century, but his political views "shifted with the times". According to Smith, "he was greatly interested in labour questions, deeply sympathetic to labour aspirations and believed the state might interfere with wages and that the state had a duty to deal with unemployment".

== Other appointments ==
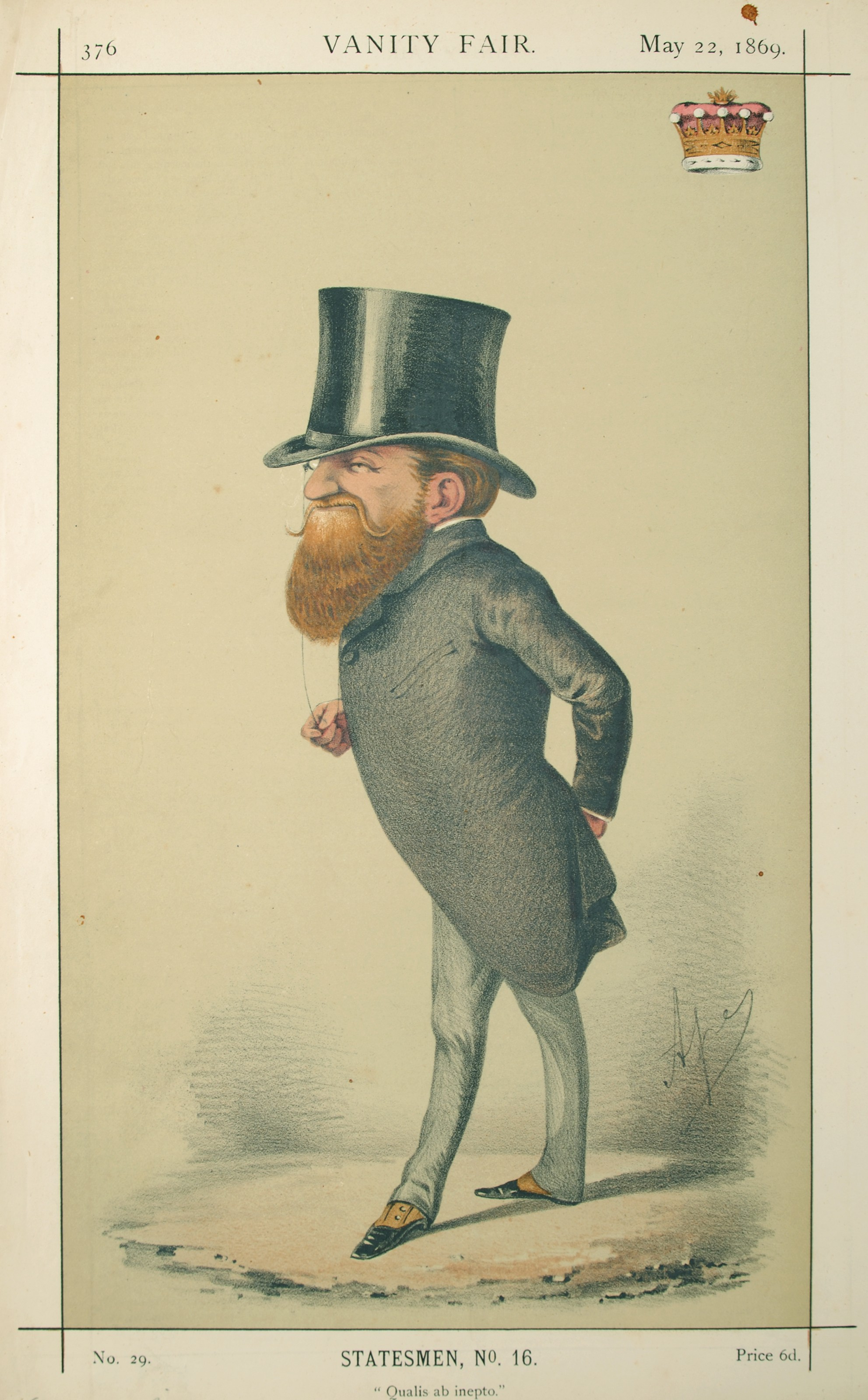
Robinson caricatured in Vanity Fair, 1869

Lord Ripon was President of the Royal Geographical Society during 1859–1860, and Trustee of the National Gallery. Lord Ripon also held many positions in public life in Yorkshire. In 1860, he was appointed honorary Colonel of the 1st Volunteer Battalion of the Prince of Wales' Own (West Yorkshire) Regiment, and was later awarded the Volunteer Decoration (VD); in 1863, he was High Steward of the borough of Hull, and from 1873 to 1906 he was Lord Lieutenant of the North Riding of Yorkshire. He was a deputy lieutenant and JP for the counties of Lincolnshire and the West Riding of Yorkshire, JP for the Liberty of Ripon, and served as Mayor of Ripon in 1895–1896.

Lord Ripon was a Freemason, who served as Provincial Grand Master of the West Riding and Deputy Grand Master of the United Grand Lodge of England from 1861 to 1869, and ultimately as Grand Master from 1870 until his conversion to Catholicism in 1874. His conversion to Catholicism was met by astonishment in the political world and accusations of disloyalty.

Following his conversion he was generous in supporting Catholic educational and charitable works. He was president of the Society of St Vincent de Paul from 1899 until his death and a great supporter of St. Joseph's Catholic Missionary Society and St Wilfrid's Church in Ripon.

Lord Ripon was Chancellor of the University of Leeds from its creation in 1904 until his death in 1909.

== Marriage and children ==
Lord Ripon married his cousin Henrietta Anne Theodosia Vyner, daughter of Henry Vyner and his wife Lady Mary Gertrude Robinson, daughter of Thomas Robinson, 2nd Earl de Grey, on 8 April 1851. They had one son and one daughter:

- Frederick Oliver Robinson, 2nd Marquess of Ripon (29 January 1852 – 22 September 1923)
- Hon. Mary Sarah Robinson (16 July 1857 – 3 July 1858), died in infancy

== Death ==
Lady Ripon died in February 1907, aged 73. Lord Ripon survived her by two years and died of heart failure at Studley Royal Park in July 1909, aged 81. He was buried at St Mary's, Studley Royal and was succeeded in the marquessate and other titles by his only son, Frederick Oliver. His estate was assessed for probate with a value of £127,292. 15s. 8d. (equivalent to £13.1 million in 2025).

== Arms ==
Coat of arms of George Robinson, 1st Marquess of Ripon
Crest Out of a coronet composed of fleurs-de-lis a mount vert thereon a stag at gaze gold. Escutcheon Vert a chevron between three stags at gaze or. Supporters On either side a greyhound reguardant sable. Motto Qualis ab incepto (The same as from the beginning). Orders The Most Noble Order of the Garter - Knight Companion (KG). Other versions Lord Ripon is also recorded as using a six-quartered version of his arms:

== Ancestry ==
Ancestors of George Robinson, 1st Marquess of Ripon

8. Thomas Robinson
4. Thomas Robinson
9. Frances Worsley
2. F. J. Robinson
10. Philip Yorke
5. Mary Jemima Yorke
11. Jemima Campbell
1. George Robinson
12. George Hobart
6. Robert Hobart
13. Albinia Bertie
3. Sarah Hobart
14. Edmund Bourke
7. Margaretta Bourke
15.

Parliament of the United Kingdom
Preceded by Matthew Talbot Baines; James Clay	Member of Parliament for Kingston upon Hull; 1852–1853; With: James Clay	Vacant Writ suspended Title next held by William Henry Watson; William Digby Seymour
Preceded by William Rookes Crompton Stansfield	Member of Parliament for Huddersfield; 1853–1857	Succeeded by Edward Akroyd
Preceded by Richard Cobden; Edmund Beckett Denison	Member of Parliament for the West Riding of Yorkshire; 1857–1859; With: Edmund Beckett Denison	Succeeded by Edmund Beckett Denison; Sir John Ramsden, Bt
Political offices
Preceded by The Earl of Rosslyn	Under-Secretary of State for War; 1859 – January 1861	Succeeded by Thomas Baring
Preceded by Thomas Baring	Under-Secretary of State for India; January–July 1861	Succeeded by Thomas Baring
Preceded by Thomas Baring	Under-Secretary of State for War; July 1861 – 1863	Succeeded by Marquess of Hartington
Preceded by Sir George Lewis, Bt	Secretary of State for War; 1863–1866	Succeeded by Marquess of Hartington
Preceded by Sir Charles Wood, Bt	Secretary of State for India; February–June 1866	Succeeded by Viscount Cranborne
Preceded by The Duke of Marlborough	Lord President of the Council; 1868–1873	Succeeded by The Lord Aberdare
Preceded by Lord George Hamilton	First Lord of the Admiralty; 1886	Succeeded by Lord George Hamilton
Preceded by The Lord Knutsford	Secretary of State for the Colonies; 1892–1895	Succeeded by Joseph Chamberlain
Preceded by The Marquess of Salisbury	Lord Privy Seal; 1905–1908	Succeeded by The Earl of Crewe
Preceded by The Marquess of Lansdowne	Leader of the House of Lords; 1905–1908	Succeeded by The Earl of Crewe
Party political offices
Preceded by The Earl Spencer	Leader of the Liberals in the House of Lords; 1905–1908	Succeeded by The Earl of Crewe
Government offices
Preceded by The Lord Lytton	Viceroy of India; 1880–1884	Succeeded by The Earl of Dufferin
Masonic offices
Preceded by The Earl of Zetland	Grand Master of the United Grand Lodge of England; 1870–1874	Succeeded by The Prince of Wales
Honorary titles
Preceded by The Earl of Zetland	Lord Lieutenant of the North Riding of Yorkshire; 1873–1906	Succeeded by Sir Thomas Bell, Bt
Academic offices
New office University establishment	Chancellor of the University of Leeds; 1904–1909	Succeeded by Victor Cavendish, 9th Duke of Devonshire
Peerage of the United Kingdom
New creation	Marquess of Ripon; 1871–1909	Succeeded by Frederick Oliver Robinson
Preceded by Frederick John Robinson	Earl of Ripon; 1859–1909	Succeeded by Frederick Oliver Robinson
Preceded by Thomas Philip de Grey	Earl de Grey; 1859–1909	Succeeded by Frederick Oliver Robinson
