= The Staircase of the London Residence of the Painter =

1828 painting by Pieter Christoffel Wonder

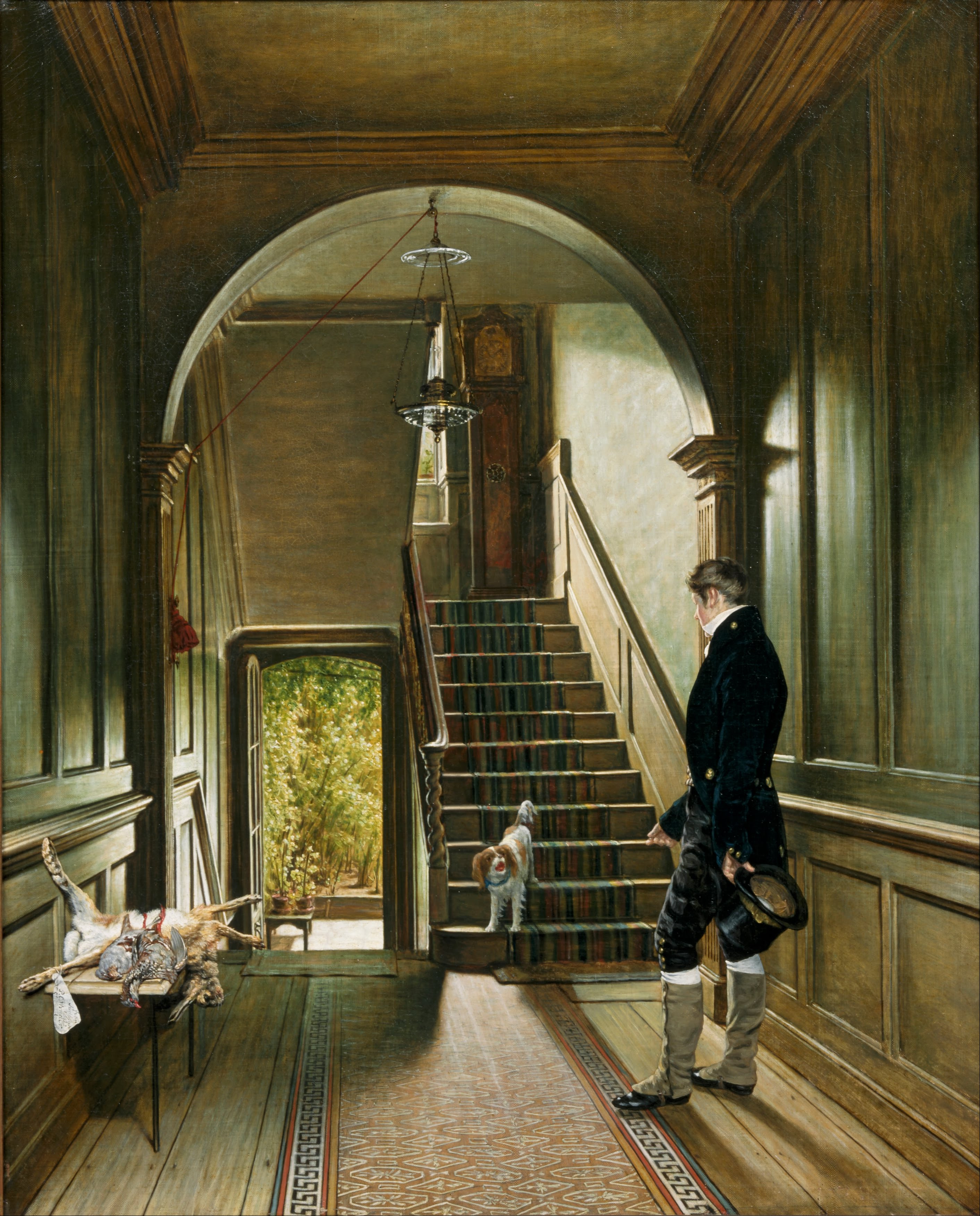
Pieter Christoffel Wonder - The Staircase of the London Residence of the Painter

The Staircase of the London Residence of the Painter is a painting made in 1828 by the Dutch painter Pieter Christoffel Wonder. It is a well-known work from the Centraal Museum in Utrecht, Netherlands.

The figure in the painting has been identified as the Viscount Goderich, who briefly served as British Prime Minister between August 1827 and January 1828. His brief period in office was an unhappy one, and the painting shows pleasures of rural leisure and retirement, represented by the game animals and the open garden door; this is contrasted with the timely apparatus of state represented by the clock and the stairs showing the concept of politics as a 'higher calling'.
