= F. J. Robinson, 1st Viscount Goderich =

Prime Minister of the United Kingdom from 1827 to 1828

The Right Honourable The Earl of Ripon PC
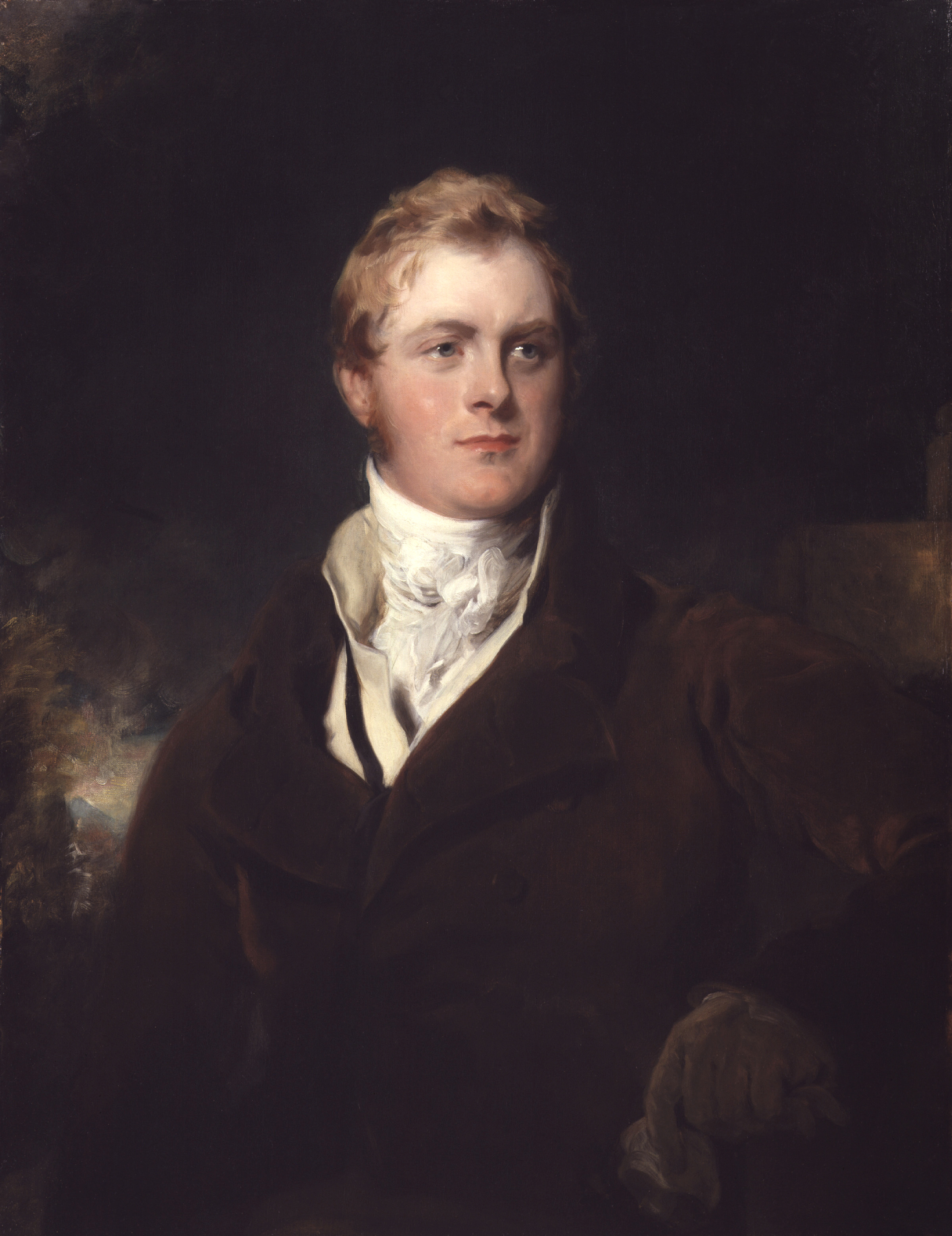
- Portrait of Frederick Robinson by Thomas Lawrence, c. 1824

Prime Minister of the United Kingdom
- In office 31 August 1827 – 21 January 1828
- Monarch: George IV
- Preceded by: George Canning
- Succeeded by: The Duke of Wellington
Ministerial offices
President of the Board of Control
In office 17 May 1843 – 30 June 1846
Prime Minister	Sir Robert Peel
Preceded by	The Lord FitzGerald and Vesey
Succeeded by	Sir John Hobhouse
President of the Board of Trade
In office 3 September 1841 – 15 May 1843
Prime Minister	Sir Robert Peel
Preceded by	Henry Labouchere
Succeeded by	William Ewart Gladstone
In office 24 January 1818 – 21 February 1823
Prime Minister	The Earl of Liverpool
Preceded by	The Earl of Clancarty
Succeeded by	William Huskisson
Lord Keeper of the Privy Seal
In office 3 April 1833 – 5 June 1834
Prime Minister	The Earl Grey
Preceded by	The Lord Durham
Succeeded by	The Earl of Carlisle
Secretary of State for War and the Colonies
In office 22 November 1830 – 3 April 1833
Prime Minister	The Earl Grey
Preceded by	Sir George Murray
Succeeded by	Edward Stanley
In office 30 April 1827 – 3 September 1827
Prime Minister	George Canning
Preceded by	The Earl Bathurst
Succeeded by	William Huskisson
Chancellor of the Exchequer
In office 31 January 1823 – 20 April 1827
Prime Minister	The Earl of Liverpool
Preceded by	Nicholas Vansittart
Succeeded by	George Canning
Treasurer of the Navy
In office 12 February 1818 – 8 February 1823
Prime Minister	The Earl of Liverpool
Preceded by	George Rose
Succeeded by	William Huskisson
Paymaster of the Forces
In office 26 November 1813 – 9 August 1817
Prime Minister	The Earl of Liverpool
Preceded by	Lord Charles Somerset
Succeeded by	The Lord Farnborough
Vice-President of the Board of Trade
In office 29 September 1812 – 24 January 1818
Prime Minister	The Earl of Liverpool
Preceded by	George Rose
Succeeded by	Thomas Wallace

Personal details
- Born: Frederick John Robinson; 1 November 1782 Skelton-on-Ure, Yorkshire, England
- Died: 28 January 1859 (aged 76) Putney Heath, Surrey, England
- Resting place: All Saints' Church, Nocton
- Party: Pittite Tory (1806–1834); Conservative (1834–1846)
- Spouse: Sarah Hobart (m. 1814)
- Parents: Thomas Robinson, 2nd Baron Grantham (father); Lady Mary Jemima Yorke (mother)
- Education: St John's College, Cambridge

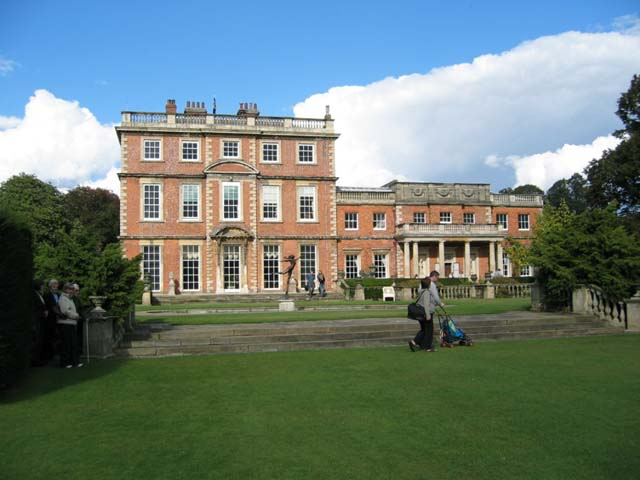
Newby Hall, Robinson's birthplace

Frederick John Robinson, 1st Earl of Ripon (1 November 1782 – 28 January 1859), styled The Honourable F. J. Robinson until 1827 and known between 1827 and 1833 as the Viscount Goderich (pronounced /ˈɡoʊdrɪtʃ/ GOH-dritch), the name by which he is best known to history, was Prime Minister of the United Kingdom from 1827 to 1828.

A member of the rural landowning aristocracy, Robinson entered politics through family connections. In the House of Commons, he rose through junior ministerial ranks, achieving cabinet office in 1818 as President of the Board of Trade. In 1823, he was appointed Chancellor of the Exchequer, a post he held for four years. In 1827, he was raised to the peerage, and in the House of Lords was Leader of the House and Secretary of State for War and the Colonies.

In 1827, Prime Minister George Canning died after only 119 days in office, and Goderich succeeded him. However, he was unable to hold together Canning's fragile coalition of moderate Tories and Whigs, and he himself resigned after only 144 days. Canning and Goderich were the two shortest-ruling Prime Ministers in British history, until Liz Truss in 2022.

After leaving the premiership Goderich served in the cabinets of two of his successors, the Earl Grey and Sir Robert Peel.

== Early years: 1782–1804 ==
Robinson was born at Newby Hall, Yorkshire, the second son of Thomas Robinson, 2nd Baron Grantham, by his wife Lady Mary Jemima Yorke, a daughter of Philip Yorke, 2nd Earl of Hardwicke. He was educated at a preparatory school at Sunbury-on-Thames, then attended Harrow School from 1796 to 1799, followed by St John's College, Cambridge, from 1799 to 1802. William Pitt the Younger was Member of Parliament for Cambridge University, to which, as The Times said, "accordingly most of the budding Tory statesmen of the day resorted". (Note: Other future prime ministers to attend the same school and college during Robinson's time there were George Hamilton-Gordon, 4th Earl of Aberdeen, and Henry John Temple, 3rd Viscount Palmerston.) Robinson was an accomplished classicist, winning Sir William Browne's Medal for the best Latin ode in 1801. After graduating in 1802 he was admitted to Lincoln's Inn. He remained a member there until 1809, but did not pursue a legal career and was not called to the bar.

Against the background of the Napoleonic Wars, Robinson did part-time military service at home as captain (1803), ultimately major (1814–1817) in the Northern Regiment of West Riding Yeomanry.

== Early political career: 1804–1807 ==
=== Member of Parliament, 1804–1812 ===
Robinson entered politics through a family connection. His mother's cousin, the third Earl of Hardwicke, Lord Lieutenant of Ireland, appointed him as his private secretary in 1804. Two years later Hardwicke secured for him the parliamentary seat of Carlow, a pocket borough near Dublin. In 1807 Robinson gave up the seat and was elected as MP for Ripon, close to his family home in Yorkshire.

=== First political appointments: 1807–1812 ===
In his first years in Parliament Robinson declined offers of junior ministerial posts, out of deference to his patron Hardwicke, who was an opponent of the Prime Minister, the Duke of Portland. However, the Foreign Secretary, George Canning, chose him as the secretary of Lord Pembroke's mission to Vienna, aimed at securing a new treaty of alliance between Britain and the Austrian Empire. The mission was unsuccessful, but Robinson's reputation was not damaged, and, as his biographer E Royston Pike puts it, "as a good Tory [he was] given several small appointments in successive ministries."

His political thinking was greatly influenced by Canning, but he became the protégé of Canning's rival Lord Castlereagh, who appointed him his under-secretary at the War Office in May 1809. When Castlereagh resigned from the government in October, unwilling to serve under the new Prime Minister, Spencer Perceval, Robinson resigned with him. In June 1810 he accepted office as a member of the Board of Admiralty. At the time of Perceval's assassination early in 1812, he was absent from parliament ostensibly on militia duties in Yorkshire.

He was made a Privy Counsellor in August 1812,

=== Marriage ===
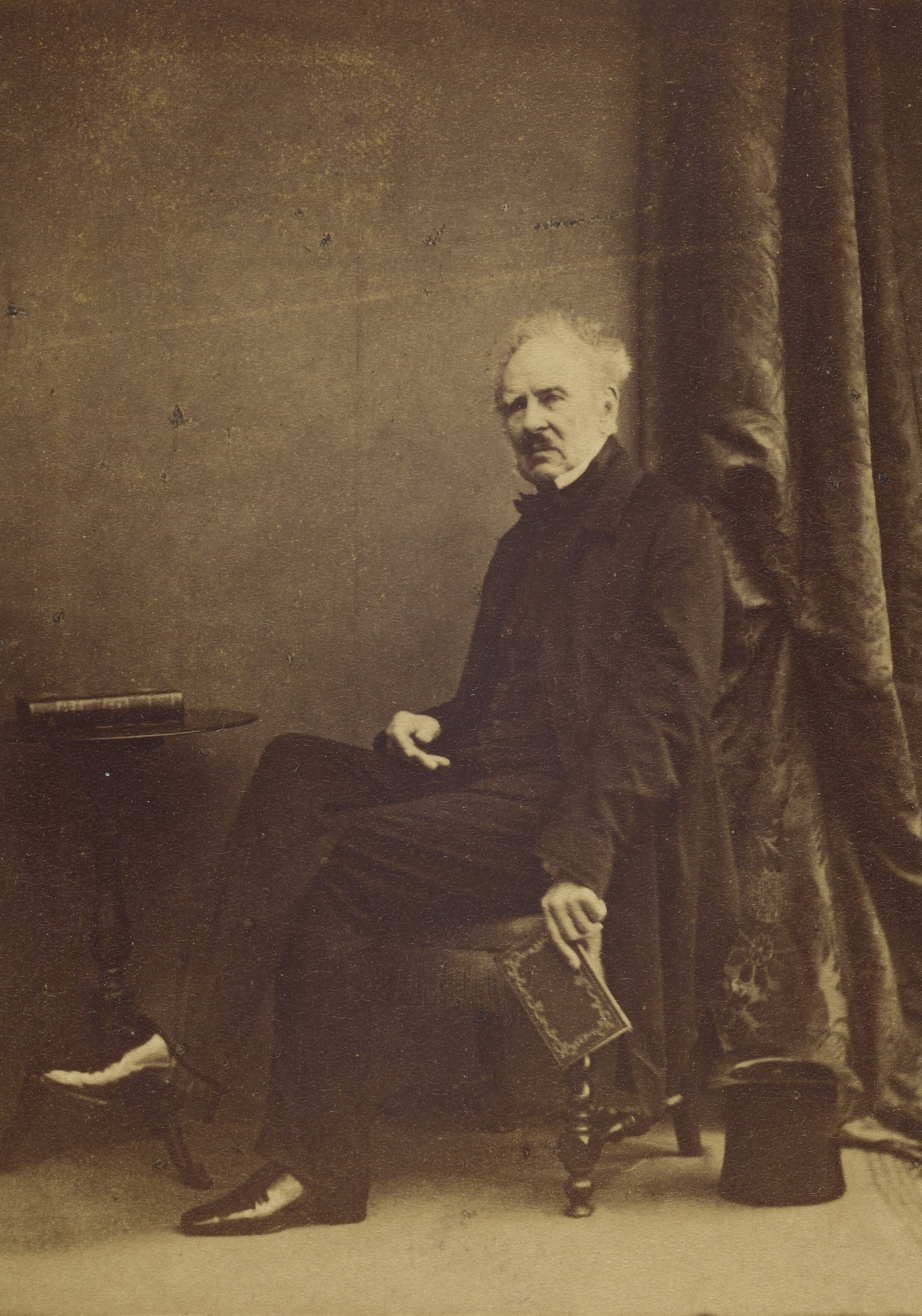
Robinson in 1859

In 1814 Robinson married Lady Sarah Hobart (1793–1867), daughter of the 4th Earl of Buckinghamshire, and first cousin to Castlereagh's wife. There were three children of the marriage, only one of whom survived to adulthood:

- Eleanor Henrietta Robinson (22 May 1815 – 31 October 1826)
- Hobart Frederick Robinson (baptised 8 September 1816 – 14 September 1816)
- George Frederick Samuel Robinson, 1st Marquess of Ripon (24 October 1827 – 9 July 1909)

== Senior Minister: 1812–1822 ==
Robinson served under Lord Liverpool as Vice-President of the Board of Trade between 1812 and 1818, and as joint-Paymaster of the Forces between 1813 and 1817, from which position he sponsored the Corn Laws of 1815. Robinson's Corn Importation Bill, successfully presented to Parliament in February 1815, was a protectionist measure, imposing minimum prices for imported wheat and other grains. The historian Gregor Dallas writes:

Robinson's Bill began a debate on free trade and protection that would last for thirty years and would change the political landscape of Britain. Battle lines were drawn up in February and March, 1815, and the first shots fired in what would become one of the most furious political struggles of the century.

The Corn Laws made the price of wheat artificially high, to the benefit of the landed classes and the detriment of the working classes. While the Bill was going through Parliament, Robinson's London house in Old Burlington Street was frequently attacked by angry citizens; in one such attack the railings outside the house were ripped out, the front door smashed open, paintings ripped, and furniture thrown out of the window. In another attack two people were shot, one of them fatally. While describing the incident to the House of Commons, Robinson was moved to tears, showing, as the biographer P. J. Jupp put it, "a propensity under stress which was to earn him the first of several nicknames, in this case the Blubberer".

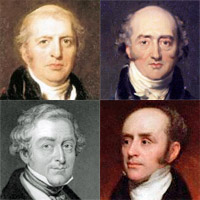
PMs in whose cabinets Robinson served: clockwise from top l., Lord Liverpool, George Canning, Earl Grey, and Robert Peel

In 1818 Robinson entered the cabinet as President of the Board of Trade and Treasurer of the Navy, under the premiership of Lord Liverpool. In 1823 he succeeded Nicholas Vansittart as Chancellor of the Exchequer. The historian Richard Helmstadter writes:

Robinson was a first-rate administrator, a superb head of a department. He had a good mind, a great capacity for work, and an appetite for precision. He was a great fusser, but he fussed in a gentle way, and no one disliked him for it. His very lack of strong partisan convictions enabled him to serve, almost as a neutral civil servant, a long succession of political leaders.

== Chancellor of the Exchequer: 1822–1827 ==
Robinson served as Chancellor for four years, and was regarded as a success in the post. The public finances were in good order, with a revenue surplus for the first three years of his chancellorship. He cut taxes and made grants to house the King's Library in the British Museum and to buy the Angerstein Collection for the National Gallery. Jupp writes, "These achievements, together with his support for Catholic relief and the abolition of slavery, led to his being regarded as one of the most liberal members of the government and to two more nicknames – 'Prosperity Robinson' and 'Goody'." Robinson's last year at the Treasury was overshadowed by a run on the banks, caused by the collapse of the City of London bankers Pole Thornton and Co. Robinson was not blamed for the collapse, but his measures to mitigate the crisis were widely seen as half-hearted. (Note: Robinson originally proposed to restrict the issue of paper money below the value of £5, but in the face of fierce opposition in the House of Commons he backed down.)

Under strain from the financial crisis, Robinson asked Liverpool for a change of post. In January 1827 he was given a peerage as Viscount Goderich, (Note: In full, Viscount Goderich, of Nocton in the County of Lincoln, a revival of the Goderich title held by his maternal ancestors, named for Goderich Castle, co. Hereford.) but Liverpool had no time to reshuffle his cabinet, being taken ill in February 1827 and resigning the premiership. Liverpool was succeeded by Canning, whose appointment caused a major realignment in the political factions of the day. The Tories split into four groups, distinguished by their view of Catholic Emancipation. Canning and his followers were liberal on the matter; Robinson belonged to a moderate group that was willing to support Canning; the faction led by the Duke of Wellington and Robert Peel opposed emancipation; and an ultra-Tory group resisted any kind of liberalising measure.

To the anger of the King, George IV, who regarded it as a betrayal, Wellington and Peel refused to serve under Canning. With half the Tories ranged against him, Canning was obliged to seek support from the Whigs. Goderich, appointed by Canning as Leader of the House of Lords as well as Secretary of State for War and the Colonies, found the upper house no less stressful than the Commons. He was the target for the anger of the anti-Canning Tories in the Lords, suffering many personal verbal assaults. When he attempted to get a new Corn Law enacted, the proposal was defeated by an alliance of peers led by Wellington.

== Prime Minister: 1827–1828 ==
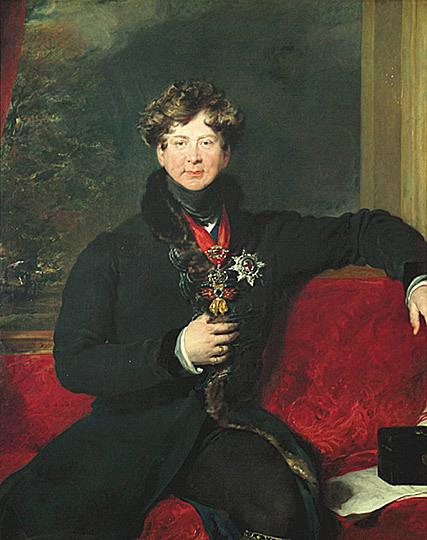
George IV

=== Appointment ===
Canning's health had been declining since the beginning of 1827, and on 8 August he died. A prominent Whig commented, "God has declared against us. He is manifestly for the tories, and I fear the king also, which is much worse." The King, however, though he had long inclined to favour Tories over Whigs, was still angry at the refusal of Wellington and Peel to serve in Canning's cabinet. A widespread expectation (possibly shared by Wellington himself) that the King would send for Wellington was confounded. On the day of Canning's death Goderich and the Home Secretary, William Sturges Bourne, were summoned to Windsor Castle, where the King announced his intention of appointing Goderich to the premiership. (Note: The official title of the post was First Lord of the Treasury.)

=== Government crisis ===
Goderich immediately encountered difficulty in balancing the conflicting demands of the King and the Whigs about the composition of his cabinet. George considered that the three ministerial posts held by Whigs were quite enough; the Whigs pressed hard for the inclusion of a fourth, Lord Holland, as Foreign Secretary. Goderich satisfied nobody with his inability to resolve matters. A leading Whig, George Tierney, spoke of his party's dissatisfaction with Goderich: "[T]hey think Goderich has behaved so ill in this affair that they can have no confidence in him. They believe so much in the integrity of his character that they do not suspect him of any duplicity in what has passed, but his conduct has been marked by such deplorable weakness as shows how unfit he is for the situation he occupies."

There was further discontent in the coalition cabinet at Goderich's vacillation over the appointment of a Chancellor of the Exchequer, once again caught between the demands of the King and those of his Whig allies. Within a month, William Huskisson, a Tory colleague, was writing of Goderich: "The king has taken the exact measure of him, and openly says he must do all the duties of a premier himself, because Goderich has no nerves! I am using nearly his own words; and he has been acting, and still talks of acting up to this declaration." George's contempt for his Prime Minister was confirmed in his description of Goderich as "a damned, snivelling, blubbering blockhead."

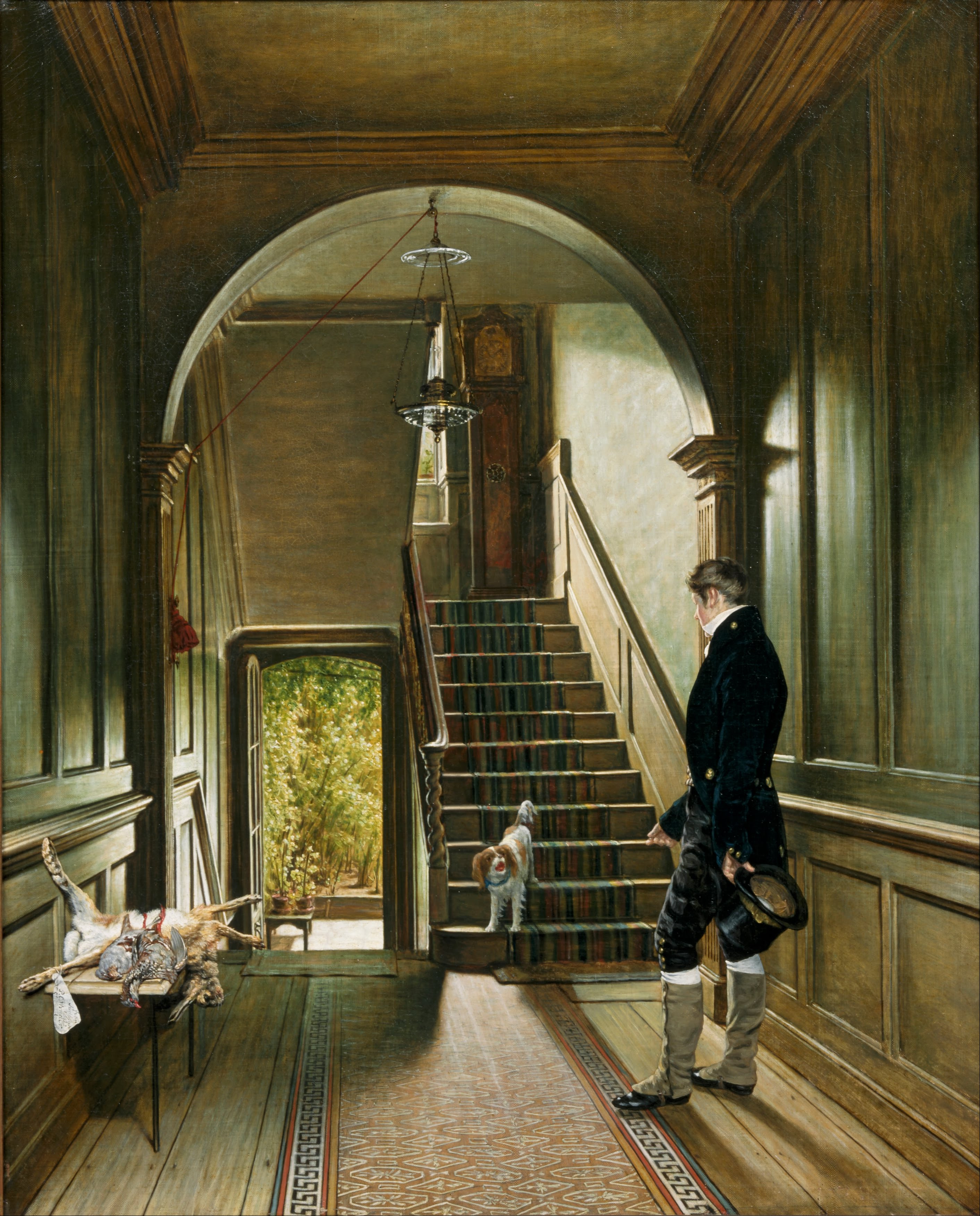
Pieter Christoffel Wonder – The Staircase of the London Residence of the Painter – Centraal Museum Utrecht (the figure identified as Goderich on day of his resignation as Prime Minister)

In addition to the conflicting pressures from the King and the Whigs, Goderich had to cope with the mental problems from which his wife was suffering. In December Huskisson wrote:

Poor Goderich is quite unnerved, and in a most pitiful state. Much of this misfortune is perhaps the natural effect of his character, but it is, in the present instance, greatly aggravated by the constant worry in which he has been kept by his all but crazy wife, and by the entire ascendancy which his good nature (not to say his weakness) has allowed her to assume.

=== Resignation ===
Wellington was by now distancing himself from the Extreme-Tory wing of his party, and by January 1828 the King had concluded that the coalition could not continue and that a Tory ministry under Wellington would be preferable. Goderich had already written a letter of resignation to the King, but had not yet sent it, when he was summoned to Windsor. He described the disintegrating state of his administration; the King asked him to send for the Lord Chancellor, who was in turn bidden to summon Wellington to receive the King's commission to form a government. According to one account, Goderich was in tears during his interview with the King, who passed him a handkerchief, but within days Goderich was rejoicing in his release from office: "quite another man [who] sleeps at nights now, and laughs and talks as usual." His premiership had lasted 144 days, which remains one of the shortest in British history, twenty-five days longer than that of his immediate predecessor, Canning.

A Dutch art student has suggested that the painting The Staircase of the London Residence of the Painter by the Dutch painter Pieter Christoffel Wonder is an allegory of Goderich's resignation. Goderich, the figure in the foreground, is offering his resignation to the king, depicted as a Cavalier King Charles Spaniel.

== Later years: 1828–1859 ==
=== Later cabinet posts, 1830–1846 ===
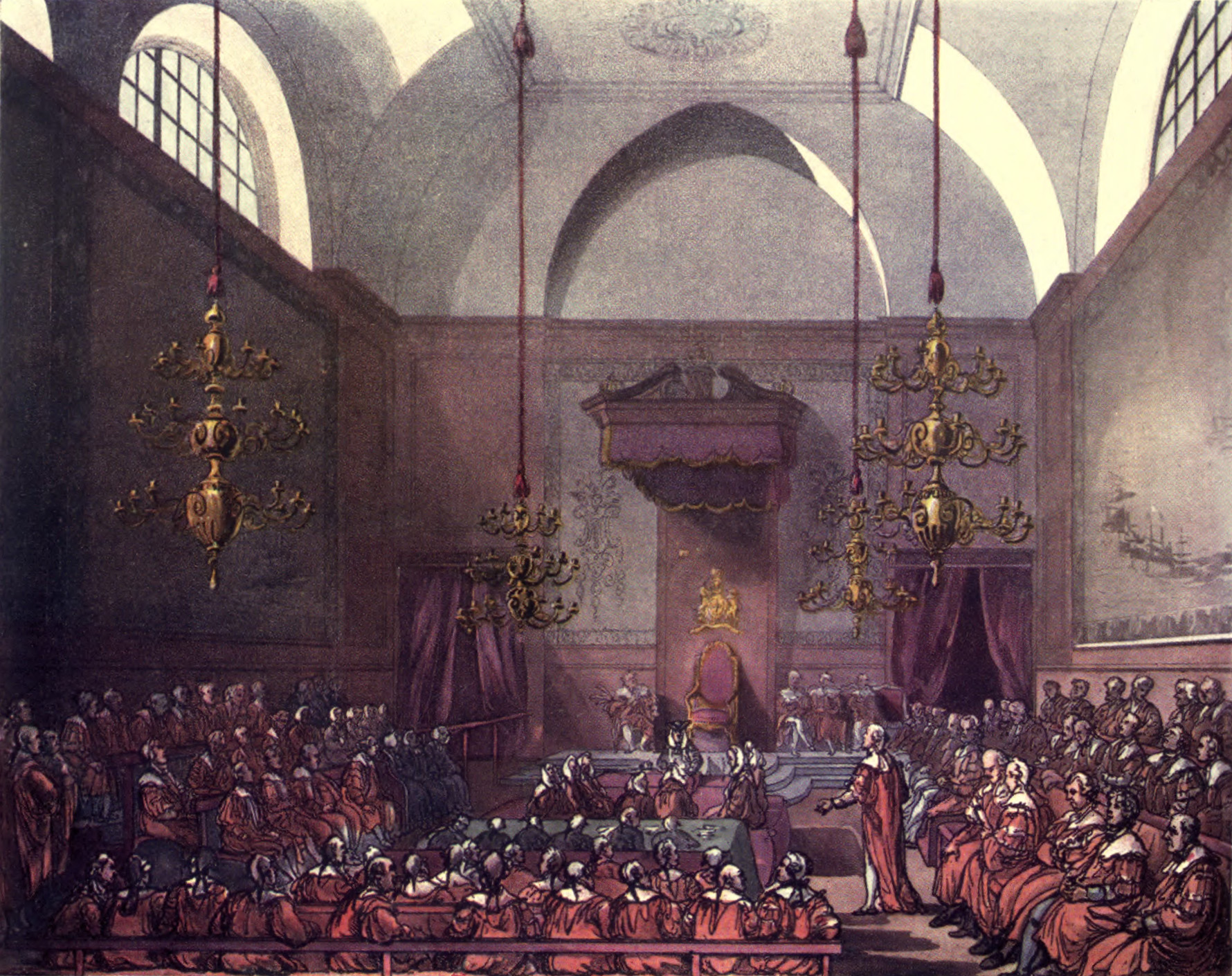
The House of Lords in the early 19th century

In 1830 Goderich moved over to the Whigs and joined Lord Grey's cabinet, as Colonial Secretary. Both on moral and on economic grounds he was strongly opposed to slavery throughout his career, and he worked hard in the 1830s for the emancipation of slaves throughout the British Empire. His work was continued by his successor as Colonial Secretary, Lord Stanley, whose abolitionist legislation Goderich piloted through the House of Lords.

In 1833 Goderich was created Earl of Ripon. He had not sought the advancement in the peerage, but wished to accept the King's offer of the Garter, for which, at that time, a viscountcy was considered an insufficient rank. He left the Colonial Office in the same year, and did not wish to hold any further office, but Grey insisted on his taking the senior non-departmental post of Lord Privy Seal. However, the next year Goderich and Stanley broke with the Whigs over what they saw as a threat to the established status of the Church of Ireland.

From 1841 to 1843 Ripon served in Peel's second administration as President of the Board of Trade, with the young W. E. Gladstone as his deputy. His final ministerial post was President of the Board of Control from 1843 to 1846. During his career, as Helmstadter observes, he had been, in succession, "a Pittite, a Tory, a Canningite, a Whig, a Stanleyite, a Conservative, and a Peelite. Between 1818 and 1846 he was a member of every government except Wellington's and Melbourne's."

Apart from his political career Goderich served as the first president of the Royal Geographical Society from 1830 to 1833, and of the Royal Society of Literature from 1834 to 1845. He died in January 1859, aged 76. He outlived five of his successors in the prime ministry.

=== Death ===
Ripon and his wife are buried in the memorial chapel at All Saints' Church, Nocton.

Ripon died at Putney Heath, London, in January 1859, aged 76. He was succeeded by his only son, George who became a noted Liberal statesman and cabinet minister and was created Marquess of Ripon. The son was unique in being conceived at 11 Downing Street, while Robinson was Chancellor of the Exchequer, and being born at 10 Downing Street, when his father, now Goderich, was Prime Minister.

== Arms ==
Coat of arms of F. J. Robinson, 1st Viscount Goderich
Crest Out of a coronet composed of fleurs-de-lis a mount vert thereon a stag at gaze gold. Escutcheon Vert a chevron between three stags at gaze or. Supporters On either side a greyhound reguardant sable. Motto Qualis ab incepto (The same as from the beginning).

== Goderich's government, September 1827 – January 1828 ==
- Lord Goderich – First Lord of the Treasury and Leader of the House of Lords
- Lord Lyndhurst – Lord Chancellor
- The Duke of Portland – Lord President of the Council
- The Earl of Carlisle – Lord Privy Seal
- The Marquess of Lansdowne – Secretary of State for the Home Department
- The Earl of Dudley – Secretary of State for Foreign Affairs
- William Huskisson – Secretary of State for War and the Colonies and Leader of the House of Commons
- J. C. Herries – Chancellor of the Exchequer
- The Marquess of Anglesey – Master-General of the Ordnance
- Charles Grant – President of the Board of Trade and Treasurer of the Navy
- Charles Williams-Wynn – President of the Board of Control
- William Sturges Bourne – First Commissioner of Woods and Forests
- Lord Bexley – Chancellor of the Duchy of Lancaster
- Viscount Palmerston – Secretary at War

== Notes and references ==
Notes

== Sources ==
- Dallas, Gregor (2001). 1815 – The Roads to Waterloo. London: Pimlico. ISBN 978-0712667852.
- Jones, Daniel (1972). Everyman's English Pronouncing Dictionary (thirteenth ed.). London: Dent. ISBN 978-0460030151.
- Jones, Wilbur Devereux (1967). "Prosperity" Robinson – The life of Viscount Goderich, 1782–1859. London: Macmillan. OCLC 1974891.
- Pike, E Royston (1968). Britain's Prime Ministers. London: Odhams Press. ISBN 978-0600720324.
- Wright, Thomas (1846). Biographia Britannica Literaria: Or, Biography of Literary Characters of Great Britain and Ireland. J. W. Parker. OCLC 39435158.
- Ziegler, Philip (1987). Melbourne. London: Collins. ISBN 978-0002179577.

Parliament of the United Kingdom
Preceded by Michael Symes	Member of Parliament for Carlow; 1806–1807	Succeeded by Andrew Strahan
Preceded by Sir James Graham, Bt; Charles Allanson-Winn	Member of Parliament for Ripon; 1807–1827; With: George Gipps 1807–1826; Lancelot Shadwell 1826–1827	Succeeded by Lancelot Shadwell; Louis Hayes Petit
Political offices
Preceded by George Rose	Vice-President of the Board of Trade; 1812–1818	Succeeded by Thomas Wallace
Preceded by Lord Charles Somerset	Paymaster of the Forces; 1813–1817; Served alongside: Charles Long	Succeeded by Charles Long
Preceded by The Earl of Clancarty	President of the Board of Trade; 1818–1823	Succeeded by William Huskisson
Preceded by George Rose	Treasurer of the Navy; 1818–1823	Succeeded by William Huskisson
Preceded by Nicholas Vansittart	Chancellor of the Exchequer; 1823–1827	Succeeded by George Canning
Preceded by The Earl Bathurst	Secretary of State for War and the Colonies; 1827	Succeeded by William Huskisson
Preceded by George Canning	Prime Minister of the United Kingdom; 1827–1828	Succeeded by The Duke of Wellington
Preceded by The Earl of Liverpool	Leader of the House of Lords; 1827–1828	Succeeded by The Duke of Wellington
Preceded by Sir George Murray	Secretary of State for War and the Colonies; 1830–1833	Succeeded by Lord Stanley
Preceded by The Lord Durham	Lord Privy Seal; 1833–1834	Succeeded by The Earl of Carlisle
Preceded by Henry Labouchere	President of the Board of Trade; 1841–1843	Succeeded by William Ewart Gladstone
Preceded by Lord FitzGerald and Vesey	President of the Board of Control; 1843–1846	Succeeded by Sir John Cam Hobhouse
Peerage of the United Kingdom
New creation	Earl of Ripon; 1833–1859	Succeeded by George Robinson
New creation	Viscount Goderich; 1827–1859	Succeeded by George Robinson
