= Pieter Christoffel Wonder =

Dutch painter

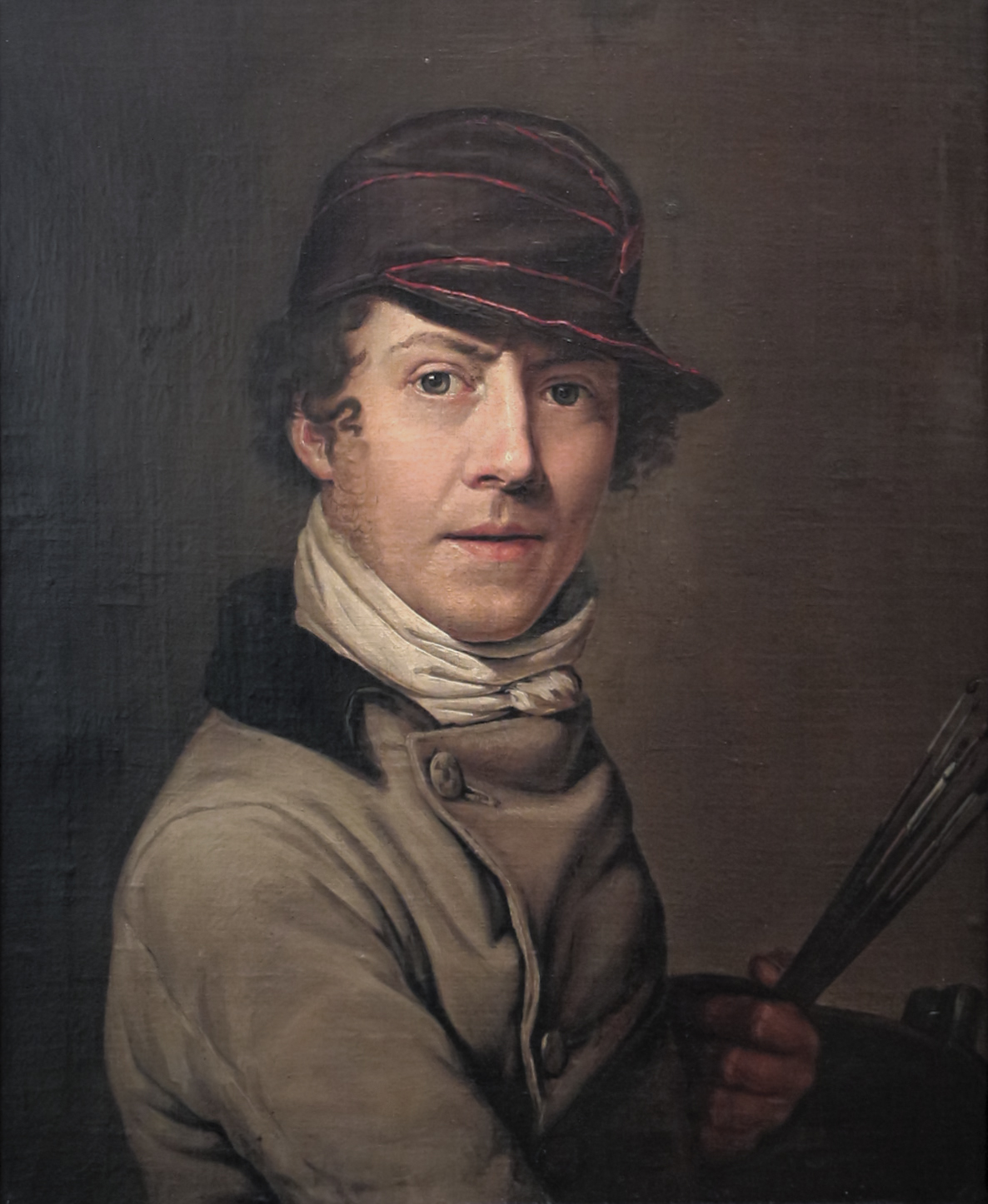
Self-portrait (1803)

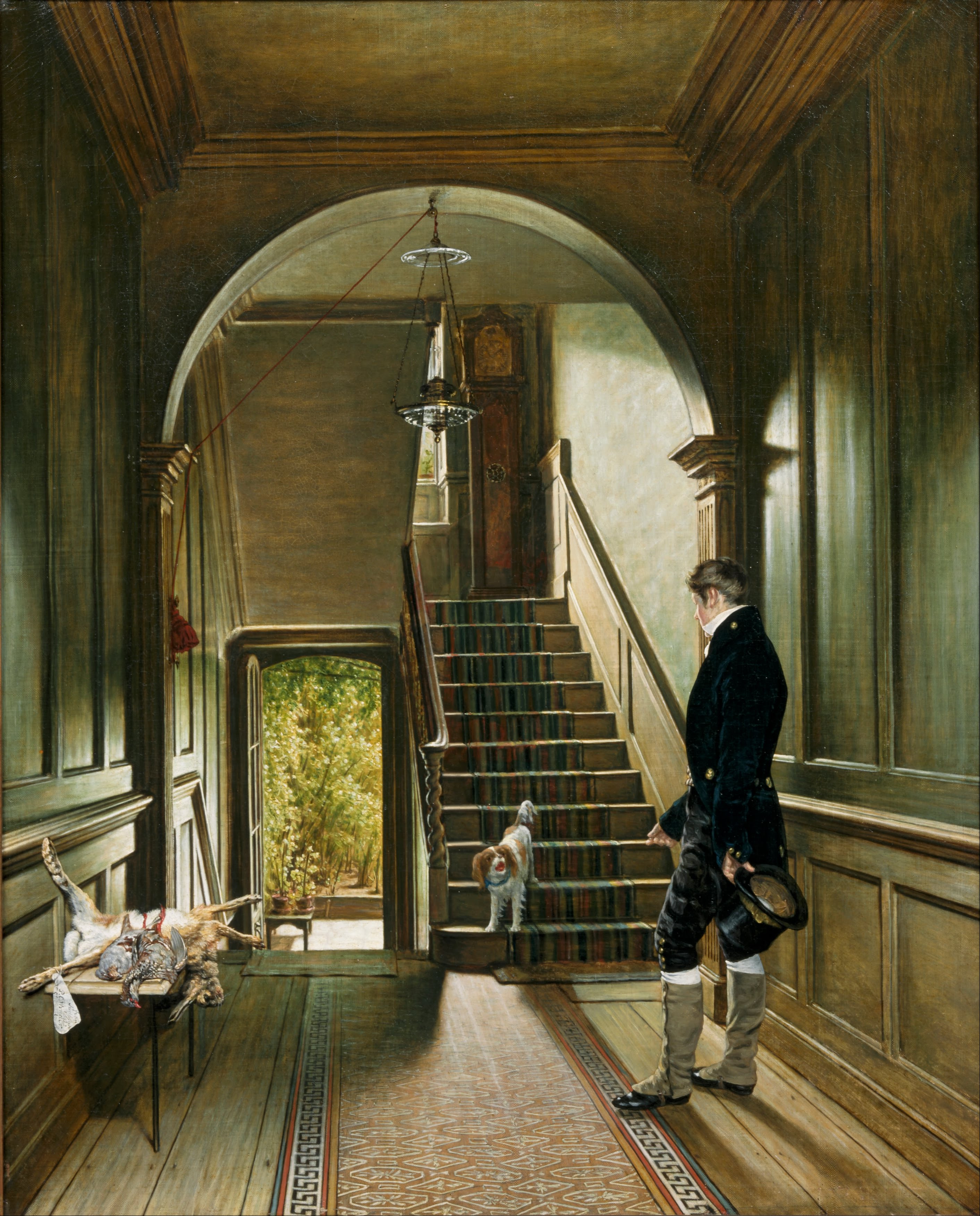
The Staircase of the London Residence of the Painter

Pieter Christoffel Wonder (10 January 1777 – 12 July 1852) was a Dutch painter, active in England.

== Biography ==
Wonder was born in Utrecht. He was largely self-taught, by making copies of the Old Masters, although between 1802 and 1804 he did attend classes at the Kunstakademie Düsseldorf. In 1807 he established the "Genootschap Kunstliefde" (Love of Art Society) in Utrecht together with other artists including Jan Kobell, and served as director.

From 1823 to 1831, he worked in England, where he became well known as a portrait painter, but also painted some interior scenes and copies of works by Raphael. Wonder died in 1852 in Amsterdam.
