= Sarah Robinson, Countess of Ripon =

The Right Honourable The Countess of Ripon
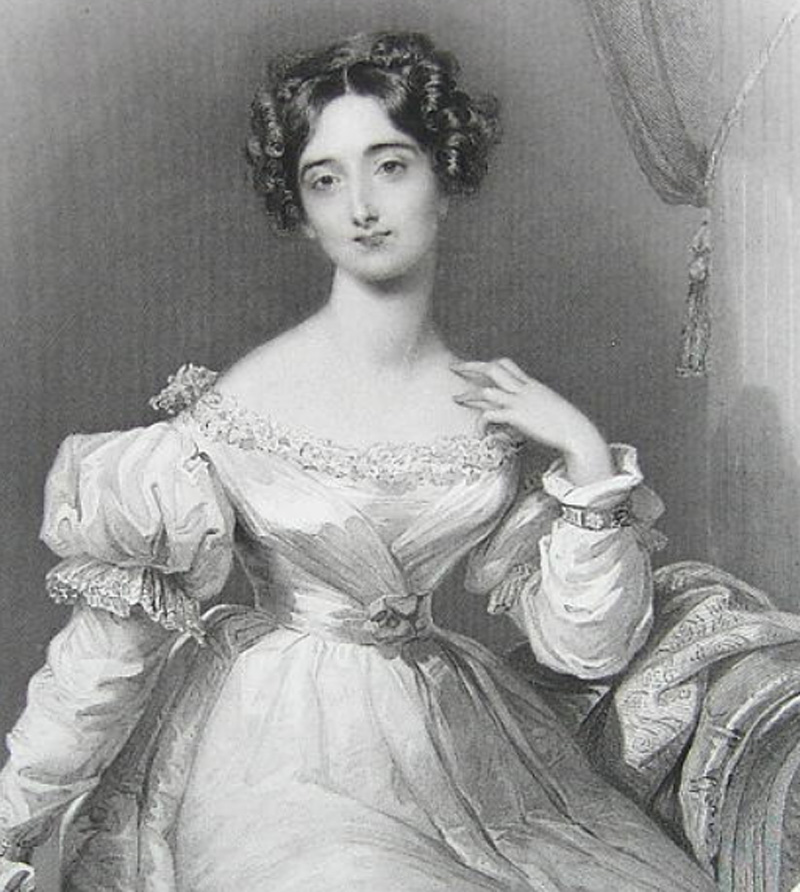
- Portrait c. 1840 engraved by W. J. Edwards from an original portrait by Thomas Lawrence
- Born: Sarah Albinia Louisa Hobart; 22 February 1793
- Died: 9 April 1867 (aged 74); Nocton Hall, Lincolnshire, United Kingdom
- Resting place: All Saints Churchyard, Nocton
- Known for: Spouse of the Prime Minister of the United Kingdom 1827–28
- Spouse: F. J. Robinson, 1st Viscount Goderich (m. 1814; died 1859)
- Children: 3, including George Robinson, 1st Marquess of Ripon
- Parents: Robert Hobart, 4th Earl of Buckinghamshire (father); Margaretta Hobart (née Bourke) (mother)

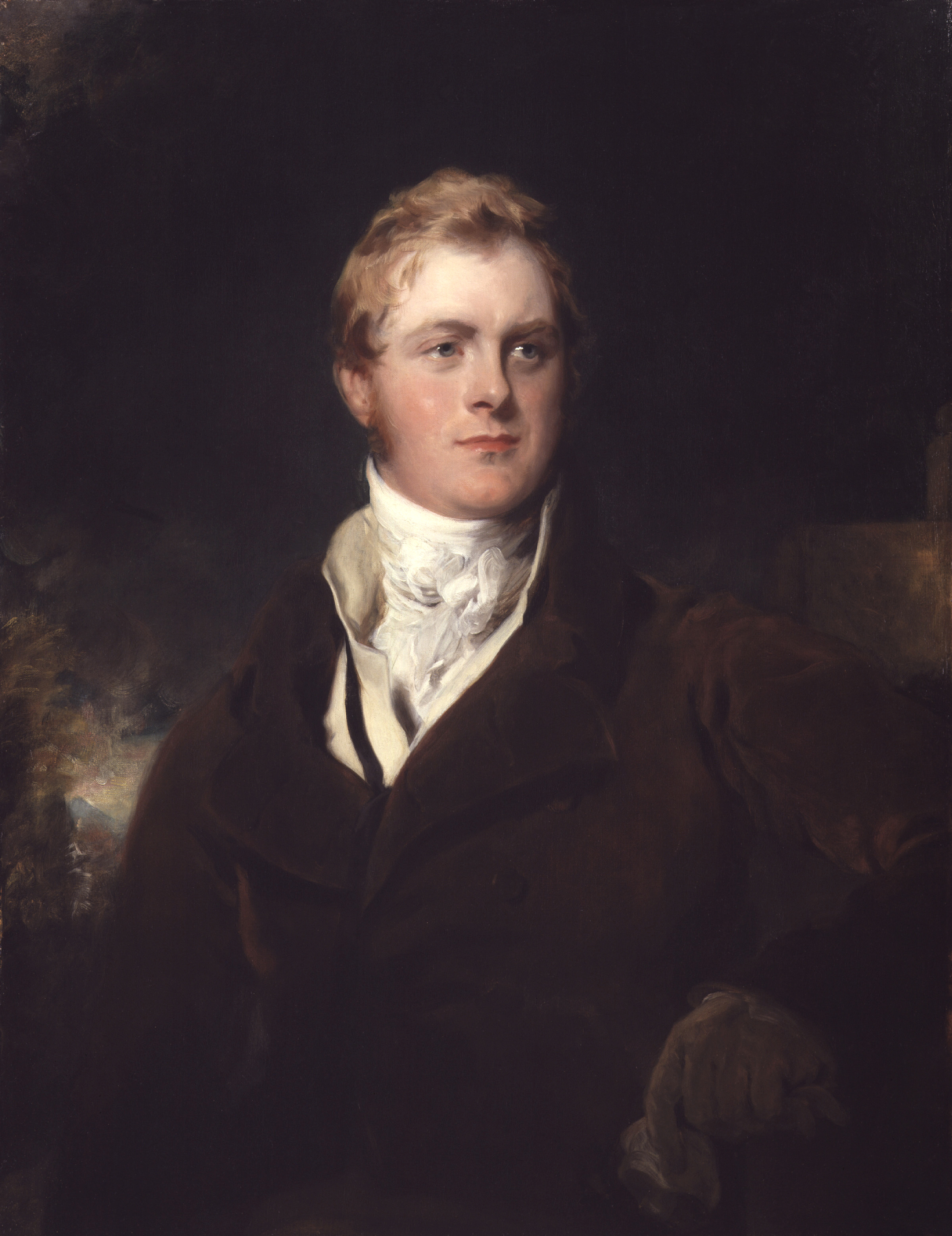
Portrait of Frederick Robinson, painted by Thomas Lawrence c. 1824

Sarah Albinia Louisa Robinson, Countess of Ripon (née Hobart; 22 February 1793 – 9 April 1867) was the wife of F. J. Robinson, 1st Viscount Goderich, who was Prime Minister of the United Kingdom between 1827 and 1828. During his term in office, she was known as the Viscountess Goderich; she became Countess of Ripon when he was made Earl of Ripon in 1833.

== Early life ==
She was born in England, the daughter of Robert Hobart (later the 4th Earl of Buckinghamshire) and his wife Margaretta (née Bourke).

== Married life ==
On 1 September 1814, she married Frederick J. Robinson, who was then MP for Ripon and held the position of Paymaster of the Forces in the cabinet of Lord Liverpool (Prime Minister 1812–27). On 22 May 1815 she gave birth to their first child, Eleanor Henrietta Victoria Robinson. Sarah's father died on 4 February 1816 and she and Frederick inherited all of his property. She gave birth to a son, Hobart Frederick Robinson, on 8 September 1816, but he died shortly after.

In 1818, Robinson became President of the Board of Trade, and then in 1823 became Chancellor of the Exchequer.

Lady Robinson's daughter Eleanor died on 31 October 1826. Her husband was made Viscount Goderich on 28 April 1827, and so she became a viscountess.

=== Prime Minister's wife ===
Viscount Goderich became First Lord of the Treasury (Prime Minister) in August 1827 after the sudden death of George Canning, and another son was born on 24 October, named George after the deceased Prime Minister. Lady Goderich may have suffered from post-natal depression after her second son's birth.

Viscountess Goderich was the subject of much criticism and gossip during her husband's premiership. In December 1827 William Huskisson wrote:

Poor Goderich is quite unnerved, and in a most pitiful state. Much of this misfortune is perhaps the natural effect of his character, but it is, in the present instance, greatly aggravated by the constant worry in which he has been kept by his all but crazy wife, and by the entire ascendancy which his good nature (not to say his weakness) has allowed her to assume.

American diplomat Christopher Hughes called her, "a tormenting, worrying & very pretty woman; & has always ruled the Roost in her household & bullies his Lordship into her will & way; I know her as Lady Sarah Robinson;" & though she is a very nice woman, she is capricious & Sovereigns over her Lord."

Lady Goderich was also described as being "demanding, neurotic and hypochondrial." There exist letters written by Sarah's step aunt, the writer Emily Eden, which frequently describes her niece's strange behaviour. In 1826 she said:

I will not say anything about Sarah; she is too bad if she knows what she is about. Poor Mr. Robinson (Frederick) was summoned back from Wrest Park yesterday, where he had been amusing himself for three days. She sent him word she was dying, and when he arrived in the greatest haste yesterday, she was gone out airing. He was very cross, but too late.

The aunt also felt that Frederick had a "nervous disposition" and was completely dominated by the hysterical behaviour of his wife. It is these character traits that may have made him such an unsuitable Prime Minister even though he was a competent politician in lower offices. After he resigned as Prime Minister in January 1828, one of his colleagues remarked that he was "quite another man who sleeps at nights now, and laughs and talks as usual".

=== After Downing Street ===
The couple lived at Nocton Hall in Lincolnshire. On 13 April 1833, Sarah's husband was made Earl of Ripon, making her now a countess.

Nocton Hall burned down in 1834 and was rebuilt.

Lady Sarah arranged that all the local children could attend school for a penny a week, paying the difference herself.

Lord Ripon died in 1859 and their son became the 2nd Earl of Ripon. She had a close relationship with her son, being described as "his only intellectual and religious guide until late adolescence." In 1862, Countess had the church of All Saints in Nocton Hall torn down and rebuilt in memory of her husband, to a design by George Gilbert Scott.

The Countess of Ripon died in 1867, aged 74.
