= Dunston, Lincolnshire =

Village in Lincolnshire, England

Coordinates: 53.152590°N 0.410913°W

Dunston
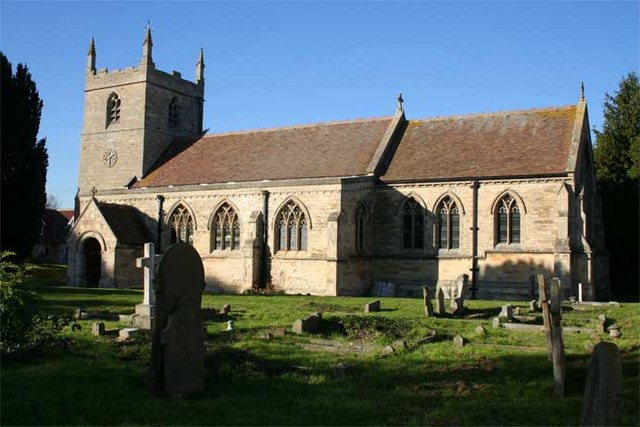
- Church of St Peter, Dunston

- Location within Lincolnshire
- Population: 1,005 (2011)
- OS grid reference: TF063628
  - London: 110 mi (180 km) S
- District: North Kesteven
- Shire county: Lincolnshire
- Region: East Midlands
- Country: England
- Sovereign state: United Kingdom
- Post town: Lincoln
- Postcode district: LN4
- Police: Lincolnshire
- Fire: Lincolnshire
- Ambulance: East Midlands
- UK Parliament: Sleaford and North Hykeham

Dunston is a small village in the North Kesteven district of Lincolnshire, England. It is situated approximately 7 miles (11 km) south-east from the city of Lincoln, and close to the B1188 between Nocton to the north and Metheringham to the south.

In Domesday the village is written as "Dunestune", meaning 'Dune's farm'. Dunston is more likely of Saxon origin, meaning 'Dark Stone'.

The parish church is dedicated to St Peter, and is a Grade II listed building dating from the 12th century. It was restored by R. H. Carpenter between 1874 and 1876.

Dunston Pillar is 3 miles (5 km) to the west on the A15. It is a Grade II listed tower and former land lighthouse built by Sir Francis Dashwood to guide travellers across Lincoln Heath. In 1810, at the Golden Jubilee of George III, the lantern was removed and replaced with a statue of the king, and in the 1843 Journal of the Agricultural Society it was described as the "only land light-house ever raised".

The Peterborough to Lincoln Line passes through the village, with a station 1 mile (1.6 km) away at Metheringham.

The White Horse public house is to the east at Dunston Fen; the Red Lion is on Middle Street.

== Twinned village ==
Trangé, near Le Mans, France.
