= HMS Arbiter =

American escort carrier transferred to the Royal Navy

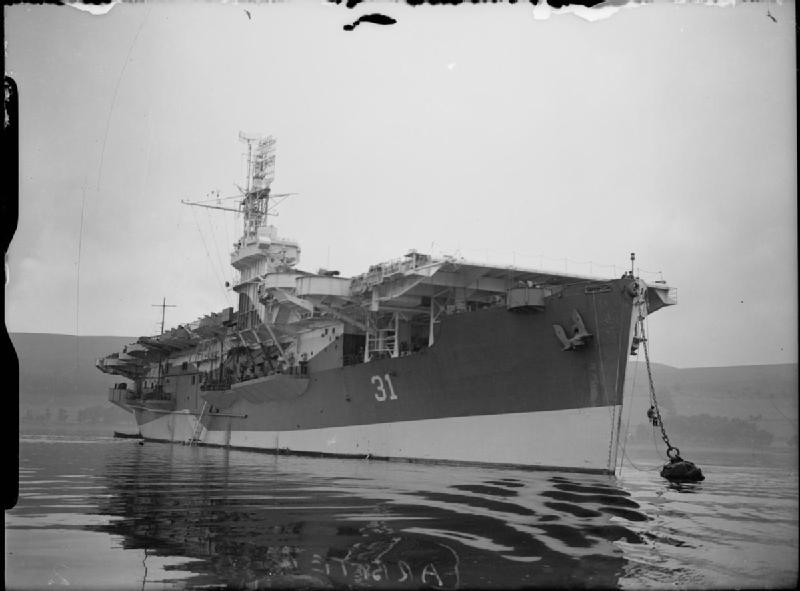
- HMS Arbiter

History

United States
- Name: USS St. Simon
- Namesake: St. Simons Sound in Georgia
- Builder: Seattle-Tacoma Shipbuilding Corporation
- Laid down: 26 April 1943
- Launched: 9 September 1943
- Fate: Transferred to Royal Navy

United Kingdom
- Name: HMS Arbiter
- Commissioned: 31 December 1943
- Decommissioned: 12 April 1946
- Identification: Pennant number:D31
- Fate: Sold as merchant ship; scrapped 1972

General characteristics
- Class & type: Bogue-class escort carrier (USA); Ruler-class escort carrier (UK)
- Displacement: 9,800 tons
- Length: 492 ft (150 m)
- Beam: 69 ft 6 in (21.18 m)
- Draught: 26 ft 8 in (8.13 m)
- Propulsion: Steam turbines, 1 shaft, 8,500 shp (6,300 kW)
- Speed: 17 knots (31 km/h)
- Complement: 890 officers and men
- Armament: 2 × 4"/50, 5"/38 or 5"/51 guns; 16 × twin 40 mm Bofors; 15 × single 20 mm Oerlikon
- Aircraft carried: 18

Service record
- Part of: British Pacific Fleet

USS St. Simon (CVE-51) (originally AVG-51 then later ACV-51), an escort aircraft carrier originally classified as an auxiliary aircraft carrier, was laid down on 26 April 1943 at Tacoma, Washington, by the Seattle-Tacoma Shipbuilding Corporation, under a Maritime Commission contract (MC hull 262); reclassified as an escort aircraft carrier, CVE-51, on 15 July 1943; launched on 9 September 1943; sponsored by Mrs. R. H. Lewis, the wife of Major General R. H. Lewis, Commanding General, Northwestern Sector, Fort Lewis, Washington; assigned to the Commercial Iron Works, Portland, Oregon, for the completion of construction; and delivered to the Royal Navy, under lend-lease, on 31 December 1943.

Renamed HMS Arbiter (D31) (while being carried on the United States' Naval Vessel Register with the classification BCVE-51), the escort carrier served in the Royal Navy for the duration of World War II. She earned "battle honors" in the Atlantic during 1944, serving on the western approaches to the British Isles, and in 1945 served as one of seven similar ships engaged in operating as an aircraft ferry supporting the British Pacific Fleet's train, bringing up replacement aircraft or providing combat air patrol for replenishment ships.

Returned to Norfolk, Virginia, on 23 February 1946, she was accepted by the United States Navy on 3 March 1946. Struck from the Navy list on 12 April 1946, the ship was sold to the Newport News Shipbuilding and Dry Dock Company, Newport News, Virginia, on 30 January 1947. Converted to the cargo ship Coracero, the former escort carrier served under two more names, President Macapagal from 1965 to 1972 and Lucky Two in 1972 before she was scrapped in Kaohsiung, Taiwan, in 1972.

== Design and description ==
These ships were larger and had a greater aircraft capacity than all the preceding American-built escort carriers. They were also all laid down as escort carriers and not converted merchant ships. All the ships had a complement of 646 men and an overall length of 492 feet 3 inches (150.0 m), a beam of 69 feet 6 inches (21.2 m) and a draught of 25 ft 6 in (7.8 m). The ship displaced 11,200 long tons (11,400 t) standard and 15,390 long tons (15,640 t) full load. Propulsion was provided by a General Electric geared steam turbinefed with steam by two Foster Wheeler boilers, and driving one shaft. The machinery was rated at 8,500 shaft horsepower (6,300 kW), giving a speed of 18–18.5 knots (20.7–21.3 mph; 33.3–34.3 km/h).

Aircraft facilities were a small combined bridge/flight control on the starboard side, two aircraft elevators 43 feet (13.1 m) by 34 feet (10.4 m) in size, one aircraft catapult and nine arrestor wires. Aircraft could be housed in the 260 feet (79.2 m) by 62 feet (18.9 m) hangar below the flight deck. Arbiter was armed with two 5"/38 caliber guns in single mounts, sixteen 40 mm Bofors anti-aircraft guns in twin mounts and 35 20 mm Oerlikon anti-aircraft cannon (14 twin and 7 single mounts). The ship could operate a maximum of 30 aircraft or carry as many as 90 in the ferry role.

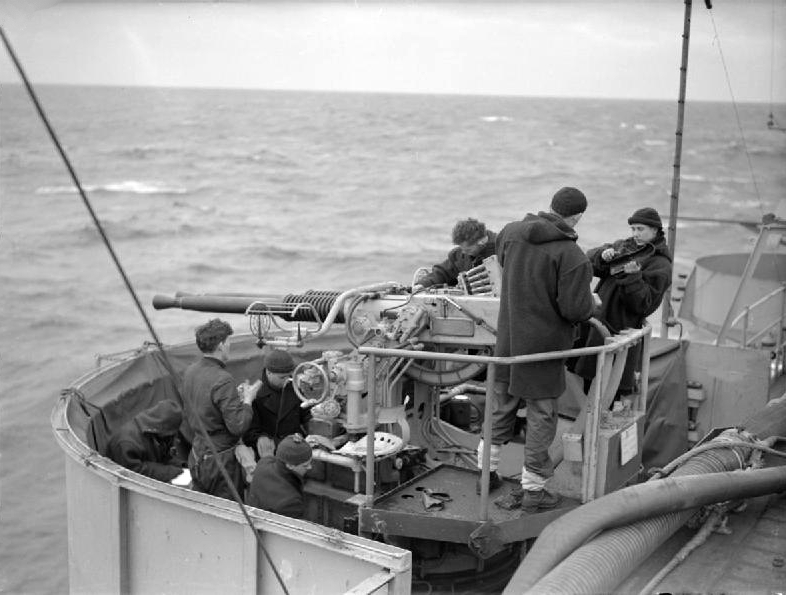
Twin 40 mm Bofors anti-aircraft gun

== Construction and service ==
The ship was laid down at the Seattle-Tacoma Shipbuilding Corporation's Seattle shipyard on 26 April 1943. The carrier was originally planned to be operated by the US Navy with the name USS St Simon, with the hull number AVC-51 (for Auxiliary Aircraft Carrier), which was changed to CVE-51 (for Escort Carrier) on 15 July 1943. She was launched on 9 September 1943, sponsored by Mrs. R. H. Lewis, the wife of Major General R. H. Lewis, Commanding General, Northwestern Sector, Fort Lewis, Washington and was completed at the Commercial Ironworks of Portland, Oregon. The ship was handed over to the Royal Navy under the Lend Lease programme on 31 December 1943, commissioning as HMS Arbiter on the same day, with the Pennant number D31.

Following commissioning, Arbiter underwent modification for Royal Navy service at Esquimalt in Western Canada, (Note: In Vancouver according to Hobbs.) before transferring to the East coast of the United States via the Panama Canal. In May 1944, she embarked the Grumman Avengers of 853 Naval Air Squadron and the Curtiss Helldivers of 1820 Naval Air Squadron, both recently formed in the United States, and crossed the Atlantic to Britain. In September 1944, Arbiter entered refit at Belfast, with changes including a modified fuel system incorporating the lessons on the loss of the carrier HMS Dasher from an internal explosion in 1943.

At the end of January 1945, Arbiter was assigned to the British Pacific Fleet (BPF) as a Ferry Carrier, supporting operations by the BPF's Fleet Carriers. She sailed for Australia on 1 March 1945, carrying the Vought Corsairs of 1843 Naval Air Squadron for the passage, arriving in Australia in May that year. She carried out her first ferry operation to the BPF in July, and later that month was fitted with hoses to act as a tanker in replenishment at sea operations using the astern method, to make up for a shortage of dedicated tankers. After the end of the war against Japan, she returned to Australia, where she was used for deck landing training for ex-RAAF pilots transferred to the nascent Australian Fleet Air Arm. From October 1945 to January 1946, Arbiter was used to repatriate Prisoners of War from Hong Kong to Australia and the Great Britain.

Arbiter was handed back to the US Navy on 3 March 1946 at Norfolk, Virginia and was struck from the US Navy on 30 April 1946. She was sold on 30 January 1947 and converted to the merchant ship Cocacero, joining the shipping company Compania Argentina de Navegacion Dodero. The ship was renamed President Macapagal in 1965 and Lucky Two in 1972, and was broken up at Kaohsiung, Taiwan from May 1972.
