= 1820 Naval Air Squadron =

Inactive flying squadron of the Royal Navy's Fleet Air Arm

- Squadron badge
- Active: 1944
- Disbanded: 16 December 1944
- Country: United Kingdom
- Branch: Royal Navy
- Type: Dive-bomber squadron
- Role: Dive bomber
- Size: nine aircraft
- Part of: Fleet Air Arm
- Home station: See Naval air stations section for full list.

Commanders
- Notable commanders: Lieutenant Commander(A) H.I.A. Swayne, DSC, RN

Insignia
- Squadron Badge Description: Blue, in sinister chief a cloud proper issuant towards dexter base two lightning flashes and a rapier white. Wartime unofficial
- Identification Markings: 1A+ 4A+ (August 1944)

Aircraft flown
- Bomber: Curtiss Helldiver

1820 Naval Air Squadron (1820 NAS), also referred to as 1820 Squadron, is an inactive Fleet Air Arm (FAA) naval air squadron of the United Kingdom's Royal Navy (RN). The squadron was established at Naval Air Station Brunswick in Maine, in April 1944 and subsequently joined HMS Arbiter in July. Throughout its operational period, the squadron exclusively utilised the Curtiss Helldiver I dive bomber aircraft. Nevertheless, the performance of this aircraft was deemed inadequate for its designated purpose, leading to the squadron's disbandment on 16 December 1944, at RNAS Burscough, HMS Ringtail, Lancashire.

== History ==
=== Dive bomber squadron (1944) ===
1820 Naval Air Squadron formed on 1 April 1944, in the United States at RN Air Section Brunswick, located at United States Naval Air Station (USNAS) Brunswick, Maine, as a dive bomber squadron, under the command of Lieutenant Commander(A) H.I.A. Swayne, DSC, RN.

It was equipped with nine Curtiss SB2C Helldiver, an American dive bomber. These were the Canadian built SBW-1B version for lend-lease to the Royal Navy and known as Helldiver I. The squadron strength was eight pilots and eight observers and they conducted familiarisation with the aircraft and equipment at Brunswick during April.

The squadron moved to USNAS Squantum, Quincy, Massachusetts on 1 May 1955, where RN Air Section Squantum was located and continued to work-up for a couple of months, before it moved to RN Air Section Norfolk at USNAS Norfolk, Norfolk, Virginia, on 5 July 1944, to embark in the Ruler-class escort carrier, HMS Arbiter.

By the 7 July, all aircrew, equipment and aircraft were embarked in HMS Arbiter at Naval Station Norfolk and the carrier sailed to New York to embark further passengers. On 10 July she then joined Convoy CU 31 and sailed for Liverpool. 1820 Naval Air Squadron disembarked on 24 July and travelled to RN Air Section Speke, the aircraft towed by road. The squadron flew to RNAS Burscough (HMS Ringtail), Lancashire, on 11 August.

Aircraft evaluation and a flying training program continued at RNAS Burscough (HMS Ringtail) until 23 October, when the squadron flew north to Scotland to operate out of RNAS Donibristle (HMS Merlin), Fife, to enable deck landing training and carrier trials aboard the Ruler-class escort carrier HMS Speaker.

The aircraft type was found to be unsatisfactory for its intended purpose. The squadron lost a number of crews and aircraft due to accidents, with three failing to pull out of vertical dives. 1820 Naval Air Squadron was therefore disbanded at RNAS Burscough (HMS Ringtail) on 16 December 1994.

== Aircraft flown ==
1820 Naval Air Squadron flew only one aircraft type:

- Curtiss Helldiver I dive-bomber (April - December 1944)

== Naval air stations ==
1820 Naval Air Squadron operated from a number of naval air stations of the Royal Navy, in the United Kingdom, a number overseas, and a couple of Royal Navy escort carriers:

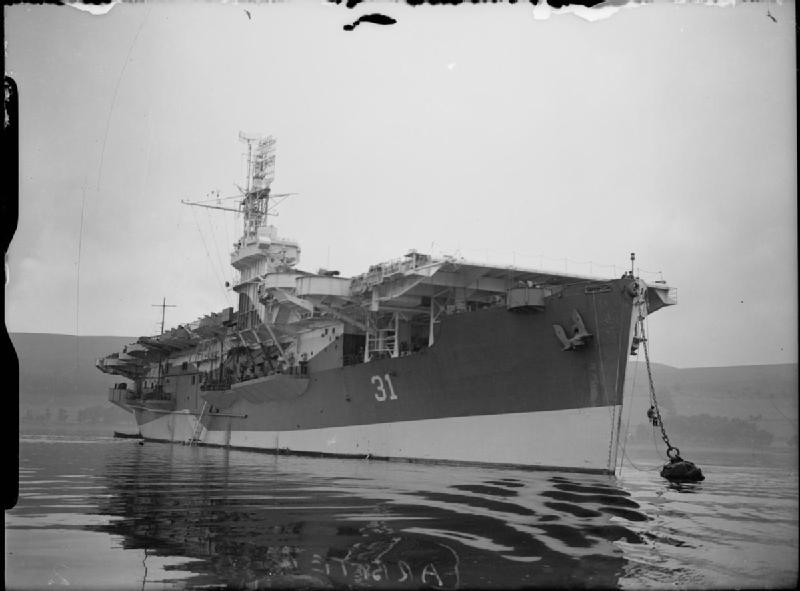
HMS Arbiter

- RN Air Section Brunswick, Maine, (1 April - 1 May 1944)
- RN Air Section Squantum, Massachusetts, (1 May - 5 July 1944)
- HMS Arbiter (5 - 24 July 1944)
- RN Air Section Speke, Merseyside, (24 July - 11 August 1944)
- Royal Naval Air Station Burscough (HMS Ringtail), Lancashire, (11 August - 23 October 1944)
- Royal Naval Air Station Donibristle (HMS Merlin), Fife, (23 - 31 October 1944)
  - HMS Speaker (Detachment Deck Landing Training (DLT) 29 - 30 October 1944)
- Royal Naval Air Station Hatston (HMS Sparrowhawk), Mainland, Orkney, (31 October - 1 December 1944)
- Royal Naval Air Station Donibristle (HMS Merlin), Fife, (1 - 4 December 1944)
- Royal Naval Air Station Burscough (HMS Ringtail), Lancashire, (4 - 16 December 1944)
- disbanded - (16 December 1944)

== Commanding officers ==
List of commanding officers of 1820 Naval Air Squadron with date of appointment:

Note: Abbreviation (A) signifies Air Branch of the RN or RNVR.

- Lieutenant Commander(A) H.I.A. Swayne, DSC, RN, from 1 February 1944
- disbanded - 16 October 1945
