= Ripon Arms, Nocton =

Community-run pub in Lincolnshire, England

Coordinates: 53°09′55″N 0°25′09″W

The Ripon Arms C.I.C.
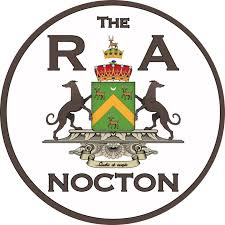
- The Ripon Arms Logo
- Type: Community Interest Company
- Predecessor: Nocton Social Club (Nocton Club)
- Founded: 1946; 80 years ago
- Area served: Nocton, Lincolnshire
- Key people: Board of Directors, Volunteer Committee

The Ripon Arms, Nocton is a CAMRA recognised community-run licensed club operating as a public house (pub) located within Nocton Hub in the village of Nocton, Lincolnshire, that has been in operation since 1946. Formally registered with Companies House as The Ripon Arms C.I.C., informally known as the Ripon Arms, the RA or just the 'club', as it was formerly known as Nocton Social Club. It now operates as a not-for-profit community interest company (CIC) as the village 'pub' and is managed by a volunteer committee, supported by employed bar staff. The RA serves as a social and recreational centre for the local community.

== History ==
=== Founding - the Nocton Social Club era (1946–1979) ===
The origins trace back to 1946, when a village hall was established in Nocton to serve the local agricultural community. That same year, Smith's Potato Estates, which owned much of the village housing, relocated a former corrugated iron building from Sleaford Market Place to Nocton. This structure was repurposed as a community facility incorporating a licensed social club known as the Nocton Social Club.

Following the decline of Smith's Crisps in the 1970s, ownership of the physical village hall transferred to Nocton Parish Council, however, the Nocton Social Club was formally set up as a separate entity under a Club constitution. In January 1979, the original building was destroyed by fire and a new brick-built village hall was constructed, allowing the continuation of community activities and the social club.

=== Nocton Club era (1980s–2019) ===
The 'Club' continued to operate in the rebuilt village hall as part of a multi-use community facility, hosting various local organisations including an indoor bowls club and the Women's Institute. During this period, the social club bar became commonly known as the Nocton Club. Nocton Club remained a members 'only' social club, however, all residents of the village were automatically deemed members, with an annual fee of £1.

In 2011, structural concerns emerged when cracks were observed in the village hall walls, alongside drainage issues. Initially suspected to be subsidence, a detailed structural survey conducted in 2014 concluded that the building's floor slab was unstable and sinking.

A working group established in 2015 by the Parish Council, which included the Nocton Club committee, assessed options for repair or redevelopment. It concluded that demolition and replacement with a modern building would be more cost-effective and better suited to the needs of a growing village population, which had approximately doubled since the early 1980s.

=== Redevelopment and rebranding - The Ripon Arms era (2019–present) ===
The original hall was demolished in June 2019. Construction of a new Parish Council village hall facility, later named the Nocton Hub, took place between August 2019 and March 2020. The Nocton Club Committee were an integral part of the redevelopment committee as a key stakeholder. The new building has an internal area of approximately 417 square metres, compared with 299 square metres in the previous structure, and incorporates modern accessibility features and a contemporary design, including a dedicated bar, cellar and lounge.

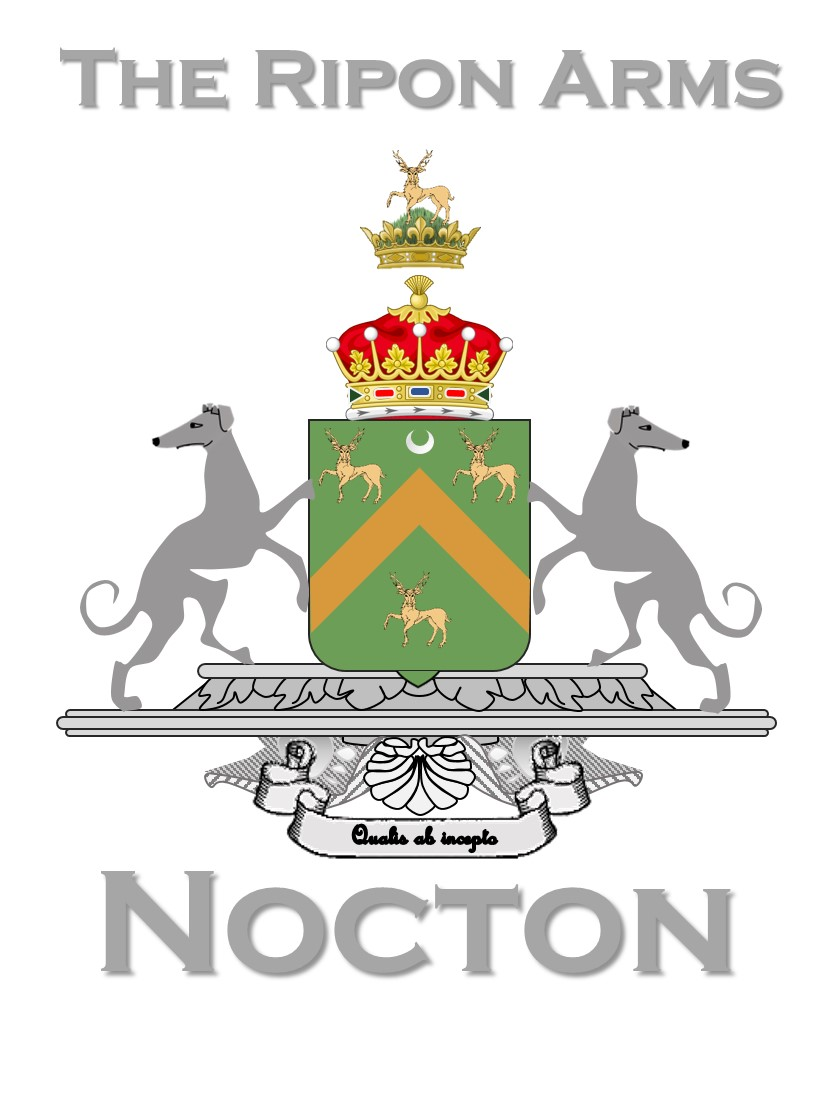
Ripon Arms Pub Sign

The Nocton Club continued to operate within the new building and was rebranded in 2020 as the Ripon Arms to reflect a more inclusive and community pub brand open to everyone.

On 30 May 2023, the organisation formally adopted Community Interest Company status as The Ripon Arms C.I.C. operating the bar & cellar within the Nocton Hub.

== Current operations ==
The Ripon Arms C.I.C. operates as a non-profit community interest company and volunteer-managed licensed club within the Nocton Hub. It opens four days per week in its own right, typically on: Thursday, Friday and Saturday evenings & Sunday afternoons (Families Day). The RA also operates a bar service, on request, in support of functions held in the main village hall, although events are booked directly with the Nocton Hub.

In addition to regular opening times, the RA provides a range of social and recreational activities, including:

- Monthly pub quiz & bingo nights
- Live music events - bands & discos
- Live televised sport events
- Visits from food vendors
- Wine Tasting Nights
- BBQs & Curry Nights
- Pool and darts teams (Both which carry the Ripon Arms Nocton name)
- Community-focused annual events such as the spring Beer Festival, autumn Noktoberfest, Race Day, Halloween Pumpkin Trail and Christmas Day opening.

The premises include both indoor seating and an outdoor seating area, with access enhanced by a wooden ramp from the car park. The venue is family-friendly, dog-friendly, and offers on-site parking.

The organisation is governed by a board of directors and a volunteer committee that meets regularly, and employs a small team of bar staff for day-to-day operations.

== Name origin ==
Coat of Arms of 1st Earl Ripon

During the planning of the Nocton Hub in 2019, the Nocton Club committee agreed to rebrand as a pub in order to encourage new members and to show inclusivity to non-members. As such, following a community naming competition, it was agreed to rename and rebrand as the Ripon Arms. The name is derived from the Coat of Arms used by Frederick John Robinson, 1st Earl of Ripon who was the owner of Nocton Hall and a former British politician who served as Prime Minister of the United Kingdom from 1827 to 1828. A modern, stylised version of his Arms were used in the design of the logo and branding.

== Recognition ==
The Ripon Arms is recognised by the Campaign for Real Ale (CAMRA) and is included in its Good Beer Guide publication each year since 2022. It was named Finalist in the Country Pub of the Year 2026 competition run by Lincoln CAMRA.

== See also ==
- List of public house topics
- Alcohol licensing laws of the United Kingdom
