= Nicholas Armstrong =

English cricketer (born 1975)

Personal information
- Full name: Nicholas John Armstrong
- Born: 12 September 1975 (age 51); Nocton, Lincolnshire, England
- Batting: Left-handed
- Bowling: Right-arm medium

Domestic team information
- Years: Team
- 1995–2000: Lincolnshire

Career statistics
Competition	List A
Matches	3
Runs scored	27
Batting average	–
100s/50s	–/–
Top score	15*
Balls bowled	138
Wickets	5
Bowling average	15.00
5 wickets in innings	–
10 wickets in match	–
Best bowling	2/18
Catches/stumpings	1/–
- Source: Cricinfo, 23 June 2011

Nicholas John Armstrong (born 12 September 1975) is a former English first-class cricketer. Armstrong was a left-handed batsman who bowled right-arm medium pace. He was born in Nocton, Lincolnshire.

Armstrong made his debut for Lincolnshire in the 1995 Minor Counties Championship against Cumberland. Armstrong played Minor counties cricket for Lincolnshire from 1995 to 2000, which included 24 Minor Counties Championship matches and 4 MCCA Knockout Trophy matches. In 1996, he made his List A debut against Gloucestershire in the NatWest Trophy. He played 2 further List A matches for Lincolnshire, against Cheshire and the Netherlands, both in the 2000 NatWest Trophy. In his 3 matches, he scored 27 runs and took 5 wickets at an average of 15.00, with best figures of 2/18.

Armstrong later studied at Durham University, where he made appearances for the university side from 1997 to 1999.
