= Nocton =

Village and civil parish in the North Kesteven district of Lincolnshire, England

Coordinates: 53.165020°N 0.418838°W

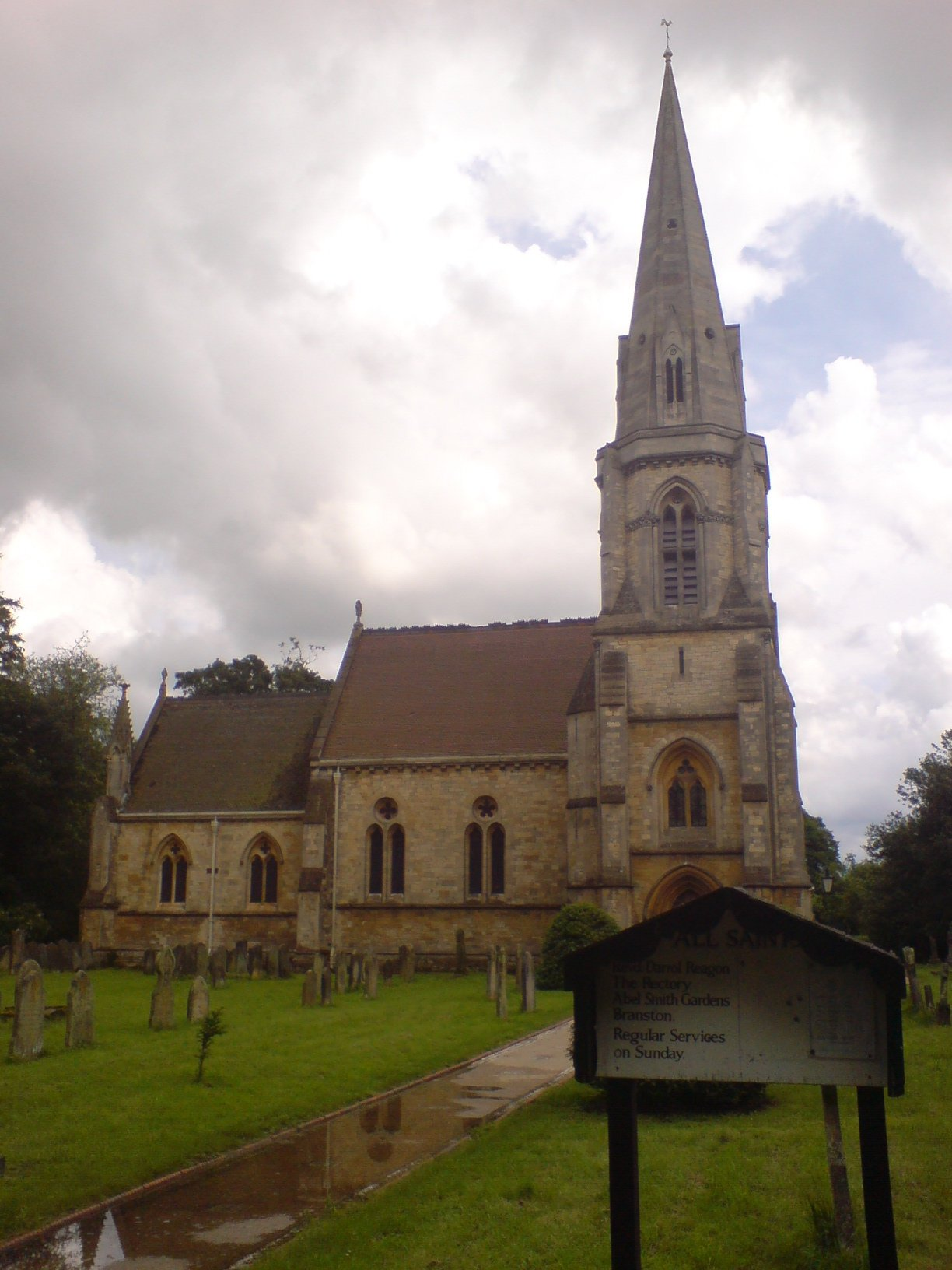
- All Saints' Church, Nocton

- Location within Lincolnshire
- Population: 819 (2011)
- OS grid reference: TF058642
  - London: 115 mi (185 km) S
- Civil parish: Nocton
- District: North Kesteven
- Shire county: Lincolnshire
- Region: East Midlands
- Country: England
- Sovereign state: United Kingdom
- Post town: LINCOLN
- Postcode district: LN4
- Dialling code: 01526
- Police: Lincolnshire
- Fire: Lincolnshire
- Ambulance: East Midlands
- UK Parliament: Sleaford and North Hykeham

Nocton is a village and civil parish in the North Kesteven district of Lincolnshire, England. It is situated on the B1202 road, 7 miles (11 km) south-east from Lincoln city centre. The population of the civil parish at the 2011 census was 819. To the east of the village is Nocton Fen with its small settlement of Wasps Nest. To the west of the village, situated at the junction of Wellhead Lane and the B1188 road, is Nocton Top Cottages consisting of eight further dwellings. At the south of the village are the remains of Nocton Hall, and 1 mile (2 km) to the east the earthwork remains of Nocton Park Priory.

== History ==
Nocton village sign on Main Street

Historically Nocton fell within the Langoe Wapentake of Kesteven until the wapentakes were abolished by the Local Government Act 1888.

=== Neolithic ===
The earliest archaeological evidence of settlement in Nocton Parish are finds of the Neolithic and the Iron Ages. A possible early Neolithic flint core was recovered in 2011 from Nocton Fen from which flint blades had been napped. A Neolithic polished stone axe was discovered close to the future site of Nocton Hall in its grounds opposite Manor Farm, in 1909,

=== Bronze Age ===
There is some limited evidence of Bronze Age occupation. A negative cropmark indicates the presence of a Bronze Age round barrow approximately 500 metres south of Abbey Hill. Two Deverel-Rimbury urns dating from 1600 – 1100 BC were found locally in 1882, possibly in Nocton Fen.

=== Iron Age ===
There is archaeological evidence of Iron Age (800 BC - AD 44) settlement and activity in Nocton that was then in the territory of the Brythonic Celtic tribal federation of the Corieltauvi. Iron Age scored pottery sherds containing animal bones were found both at the Neolithic site and to the south-western edge of the village along the bridleway to Dunston. The Archaeological and Historical Sites Index also records the presence of an Iron Age settlement and rectilinear enclosures to the north-east of the village although Iron Age Britons lived in round houses with conical thatched roofs of straw or heather that left few archaeological remains.

=== Roman era ===
The Romans were present in the area of Nocton although no sizeable occupation has yet been discovered here. Their legacy in Nocton is most strongly visible in the Car Dyke Romano-British canal that runs along the western fen edge from Lincoln to Peterborough linking the River Witham to the River Welland and forming part of an ancient fen drainage system. It is thought to have been constructed by the Romans, possibly around 125 AD. It is the dividing line between the limestone uplands of the west and the fenlands of the east of the parish, the strip between Car Dyke and the River Witham at the eastern extreme of Nocton Parish once being known as the Witham Peat Fen. Two Roman clay coin moulds were found in 1811 in the bed of Car Dyke at the north end of Nocton Wood, close to Wasps Nest. The moulds are identified as belonging to Constantine the Great (AD307–337) and his mother Helena and copies of copper alloy folles, now located at the British Museum. Other archaeological discoveries in Nocton include a beehive quern-stone, the site of a Roman settlement and cropmark and a Roman coin hoard.

A Roman road or track was thought to run South-North through Nocton. Its conjectured course starts in Metheringham and follows the course of Dunston Road to Dunston before continuing to Nocton and aligning with the western boundary of Nocton Hall's garden, then aligning with Potterhanworth Road.

=== Anglo-Saxon ===
The Anglo-Saxon era began in the fifth century with evidence of settlement in Lincolnshire dating from as early as 450. However it is considered that the area around Lincoln continued to be culturally and/or politically dominated by its former Romano-British inhabitants with their culture and institutions only gradually declining through the fifth century with the label 'Anglo-Saxon' potentially becoming more generally appropriate towards the end of the sixth century. Dr Caitlin Green proposes that the former Romano-Britons of Lincoln continued to control a large area around the city into at least the early sixth century which would likely have included the area of Nocton.

There was an Anglo-Saxon settlement at Nocton whose name is derived from the Old English words 'hnoc tun', meaning 'village of the wether sheep'. From the early days of the Anglo-Saxon era Nocton was located close to the boundary between Anglian tribal confederations and in turn kingdoms. There is no specific evidence for the location of the southern frontier of the minor Anglian Kingdom of Lindsey in relation to Outer Mercia as mentioned in the seventh-century Tribal Hidage however by 678 control and overlordship of Lindsey passed to Mercia from the Kingdom of Deira. It is likely that elements of the Great Heathen Army passed through Nocton in September 870 after destroying Bardney Abbey, crossing the River Witham from Lindsey into Kesteven before travelling south towards Peterborough.

By the late tenth century Nocton fell within the Langoe Wapentake within the Five Boroughs of the Danelaw. By the eleventh century at the time of the coming of the Normans the settlement comprised 39 families and a church. All but one of 24 carucates of taxable land was owned by Ulf of Nocton who also owned 12 carucates in Dunston that was a jurisdiction of Nocton. Oswulf of Faldingworth owned the remaining carucate Remains of the medieval settlement were found along Main Street and the church and churchyard were traced to the south-west of the current Nocton Hall.

=== Norman ===
In the Domesday Survey of 1086 Nochetune (Nocton) was held in its entirety by Norman de Arci (later written d’Arcy), Lord of Nocton. Nocton’s entry in the Domesday Book put it in the largest 20% of settlements recorded in England. D'Arcy was allotted 33 parishes, also holding land in Dunston, Timberland, Kirkby Green and Scopwick. The previous Anglo-Saxon landlords had given place to Norman at some time between 1066 and 1086 and d’Arcy’s descendants held the property for 23 generations until the 1600s.

The d'Arcy family had established a deer park at some time between 1086 and the early twelfth century and it became known as Nocton Park. Norman lords imported a craze for deer parks after 1066, their number growing from 37 to as many as 3000 by the fourteenth century. Deer parks were created in an area of the manor not under cultivation, hayfields or coppiced woods.

In the early twelfth century, around 1140, Norman d’Arcy’s son Robert granted the church at Nocton to the Benedictines of St Mary's Abbey, York and some land to the Carthusians of Kirkstead Abbey. He also founded Nocton Park Priory, which stood about a mile east of the village on a hill overlooking Car Dyke, in or near the existing deer park, for the canons of the Augustinian Order who arrived in England from 1108. Its location on Abbey Hill remains evident in the shape of the ground. The grant was reconfirmed by Robert’s grandson, also called Norman, in a charter dated 17 Jun 1218. Nocton Park Priory was smaller and poorer than the other houses of the Witham Valley and never numbered more than nine canons.

The long, parallel fields of Nocton Fen between Car Dyke and the modern course of the River Witham were the result of the division of wetlands that had its peak in the twelfth and early thirteenth centuries. Common fen or marsh pasture was partitioned between tenants to provide land for grazing and arable; these long strip-like fields of enclosed fen were known as 'dales'. Before 1331 the dales on Nocton Fen belonged to Bardney Abbey, having been granted by Mabel, wife of Andrew Pincetun of Nocton.

=== Middle Ages ===
==== General ====
Markets and fairs were held in the Middle Ages at Nocton. The first market was held in 1214.

==== Plantagenets ====
In the mid-twelfth century the western edge of modern Nocton Parish fell within an area known as Hanehaithe that denoted part of the great heath stretching southwards from Lincoln as far as Boothby Graffoe and Blankney. The heath was given to Kirkstead Abbey around the mid-twelfth century.

Thirty-nine households were recorded in 1563, falling to 28 by 1721. The population rose to 287 people in 1801 and 482 in 1901.

A charter was granted to Philip Darcy in 1257, and another was granted to Norman Darcy in 1284 to hold a fair on 21 to 22 July.

In 1334 Nocton was valued at £18 14s in the Lay Subsidy Roll.

==== Tudors ====
Nocton Park Priory was closed in the Dissolution that began 1536, at which time there was only the prior and four canons. Henry VIII visited Nocton only five years after the Dissolution on 13 October 1541 and stayed with the Stukeleys; it is widely reputed that his fifth wife Katherine Howard planted a horse chestnut tree that still stands in the grounds of the Cottage Residential Home. However, this species was not introduced into England until the late 16th or mid-17th Century.

During the reign of Elizabeth I the site passed to Henry Stanley (Lord Strange) who converted the priory into a residence.

=== Georgian era ===
In the first four decades of the eighteenth century, Sir Richard Ellys of Nocton formed a collection of books which eventually went to Blickling Hall in Norfolk by inheritance in the 1740s, though most of the books were kept in London. They form the core of the library of some 12,500 books now in the care of the National Trust.

=== Nocton Fen: Land improvement and industry in the 19th century ===
Nocton Fen stands to the north-east of the village, and includes the hamlet of Wasp's Nest. At the end of the 18th century, George Hobart, 3rd Earl of Buckinghamshire invested in the drainage of the fen. In around 1794 he paid for a windmill which pumped water into the River Witham until it was superseded in 1834 by a 40 bhp steam engine powerful enough to drain the fen faster than water ingress. A windmill for grain was erected on Nocton Heath before 1824 approximately 200 metres west of the B1188 Lincoln Road / B1202 Main Street junction and was taken down in 1827 to be replaced by a new mill at Mill Corner, approximately 700 metres to the east at the junction of the B1202 and Old Sleaford Road. The second mill burned down after 6 years in service in October 1833; its replacement on the same site was pulled down in 1904.

=== Twentieth century ===
Nocton Estates Light Railway was constructed in 1926 and used to transfer potatoes to the railhead at Dunston and sugar beet to a factory at Bardney. The light railway rolling stock and track were originally used to move munitions and troops to the front line in the First World War. The village shared the Nocton and Dunston railway station (GNR/GER Joint) until it was closed in 1955. Trains still run on the route from Lincoln to Sleaford but do not stop for goods or passengers at the old Nocton and Dunston station. There was a rail accident on this line on 28 February 2002 when a van fell onto the railway line and was hit by an oncoming train, killing the driver.

A survey of the East Midlands Oilfields including blocks around Nocton in 1943 resulted in short-lived production from a well – Nocton-2 – drilled by d'Arcy Oil Company from December 1943 until 1945 amounting to 521 barrels in total, described as a major disappointment. The Anglo-Iranian Oil Company (BP) required 100,000 tons of crude oil per year, which it found at Eakring and Caunton, as supplies from the Abadan Refinery, in Iran, were hampered until the invasion of Sicily in July 1943.

Oil was also found in Nocton in the 1960s.

==== Military activity ====
Between 1917 and 1995 Nocton Hall was used variously by the United States Army, Royal Air Force and United States Air Force as the site of a convalescent home and military hospital. The ruins of the Hall and hospital buildings remain to the present day.

In the early twentieth century, particularly during World War II, there were numerous Royal Air Force airfields close to Nocton; the level of training and operational flying resulted in a number of crashes within the parish:

- 9 September 1930. Avro 504N J9007 of 2 FTS from Digby hit a tree on Nocton Heath.
- 4 April 1941. Defiant N3333 of 225 Sqn crashed on Nocton Fen near Glebe Farm following an engine explosion at 4000 ft on a patrol sortie from Kirton in Lindsey. Crew baled out with minor injury.
- 14 June 1941. Hampden AE129 of 44 Sqn crashed on eastern Nocton Fen on approach to Waddington returning from a mining operation, killing all four crew.
- 10 September 1941. Wellington X9872 of 25 OTU from Finningley hit farm buildings on Nocton Delph 1/4 mile from the River Witham, killing all six crew.
- 1 October 1943. Halifax DG275 of 1660 HCU span into the ground at Nocton Washway close to the River Witham following loss of control during a training flight from Swinderby, killing all nine crew.

== Geography ==
Nocton is situated 7 miles south-east of Lincoln on the B1202 road just east of its junction with the B1188 (Sleaford Road).

The civil parish boundaries also cover Wasps Nest and Nocton Top Cottages. The parish measures 7.3 miles from west to east and is approximately 1 mile from north to south across its entire extent.

The next settlement to the north is Potterhanworth (1.2 miles) and to the south Dunston (1 miles). The next settlements adjacent to the civil parish to the west and east are Harmston and Bardney.

== Community ==
The community owned and operated Nocton Hub replaced the previous village hall in 2020 and is in the centre of the village to the west of Main Street. The Hub includes an events hall, meeting room and lounge area. The Ripon Arms C.I.C., a volunteer-run non-profit licensed club formerly known as the 'Nocton Club', operates from the Nocton Hub lounge five days a week and also host live entertainment and special events.

There are a number of small businesses in the village including a small post office and the Cottage Care Home. The village also has its own cricket club and pitch.

The Nocton Community Primary School, built 1869 and designed by Sir George Gilbert Scott, is a small Grade II listed school in the heart of the village, next to the village green, that is part of the Spires Federation of Schools. It includes a large playing field in the centre of the village to the east of Main Street.

Much of the village is subject to Conservation Area status, with many Grade II and Sensitive properties. On 28 May 2007 Nocton Village Trail was opened by Douglas Hogg MP. The trail is a guided history walk around the village with displays of village artwork on historical themes.

== Opposition to development plans ==
=== Nocton Dairies (Nocton Heath) ===
A planning application was submitted in December 2009, later revised and resubmitted in November 2010, to build a 3,770-cow dairy on Nocton Heath that was described as a 'battery farm' for cows. Known as the Nocton Dairies controversy it attracted significant local and national opposition including an Early Day Motion signed by 172 MPs in the House of Commons on 8 March 2010. The application was withdrawn and abandoned, citing Environment Agency objections.

=== Nocton Wind Farm (Nocton Fen) ===
In October 2013 Vattenfall Wind Power Limited proposed the construction of a wind farm of around 23 turbines reaching a maximum blade tip height of up to 149.5m, with a total installed capacity of up to 69MW at Nocton Fen. The proposal was strongly opposed by local residents citing concerns for wildlife, additional traffic and subsonic noise who organised into an action group called Protect Nocton Fen. The group canvassed 449 attendees of six public information sessions in June 2015 finding that 79% of local residents opposed the development. The application was withdrawn by Vattenfall in July 2015 citing changes in government policy introduced that "increased risk" into the project.'

== Church ==
Within the village there is a Church of England Church, *All Saints. All Saints Anglican parish church is Grade II* listed. It was built in 1862 by George Gilbert Scott, and according to Pevsner is a "typical estate church" and "one of Scott's major works". It is of Early English style in Ancaster stone, with a 130 feet (40 m) steeple. On the walls are drawn religious scenes outlined in red. There are stained glass windows by Clayton and Bell. Monuments are to Sir William Ellys (died 1680), attributed to William Stanton, to the Fourth Earl of Buckinghamshire (died 1816), to Rev. Henry Hobart, Dean of Windsor (died 1846), and to the First Earl of Ripon (died 1859), this designed by George Gilbert Scott with an 1862 effigy by Matthew Noble. All Saints was built on the site of a previous St Peter's church built by the Third Earl of Buckinghamshire in 1775, who destroyed an original St Peter's Church because it was "too near the Hall". The monument to Sir William Ellys is from the original church. Cox describes the 1775 church as having been "a mean affair".

Group Captain Gilbert Insall VC MC, recipient of the Victoria Cross whilst serving with the Royal Flying Corps during the Great War, is buried in the churchyard.

== Abandoned buildings ==
The derelict remains of both Nocton Hall and the former RAF Hospital Nocton Hall are still present within the village but out of bounds to the public.

== Notable people ==
- Nicholas Armstrong (born 1975), former first-class cricketer
- Charles Stanhope, 2nd Baron Stanhope, (1593–1675) was an English landowner, courtier, and writer of marginalia.
- Frederick John Robinson, 1st Earl of Ripon, wasa British politician who served as Prime Minister of the United Kingdom from 1827 to 1828.
