= Gilbert Insall =

Recipient of the Victoria Cross

Gilbert Stuart Martin Insall
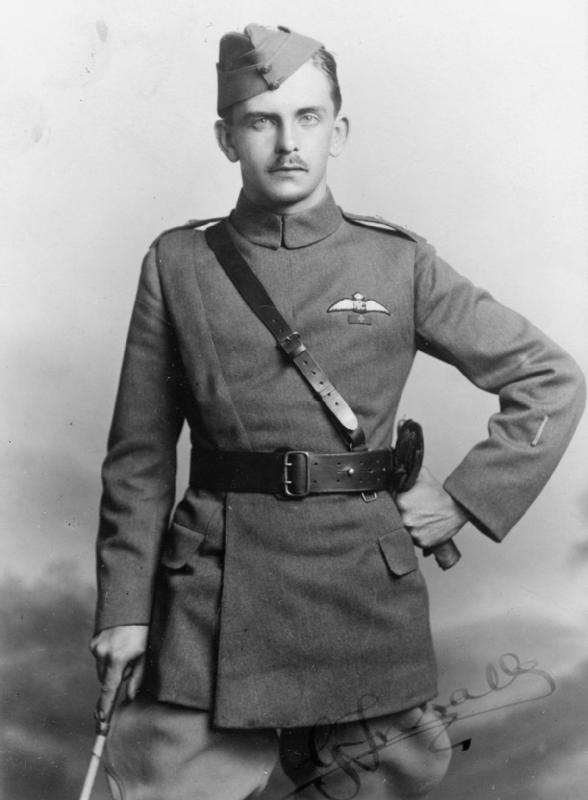
- Lieutenant Gilbert Insall c. 1916–17
- Born: 14 May 1894; Paris, France
- Died: 17 February 1972 (aged 77); Scrooby, Nottinghamshire, England
- Burial place: Cremated, Headstone at Rose Hill Crematorium, Doncaster; Headstone at Nocton Churchyard, Lincolnshire
- Military career
- Allegiance: United Kingdom
- Branch: British Army (1915–18); Royal Air Force (1918–45)
- Service years: 1915–1945
- Rank: Group captain
- Units: No. 11 Squadron RFC
- Conflicts: First World War; Iraqi Revolt; Second World War
- Awards: Victoria Cross; Military Cross; Mentioned in Despatches

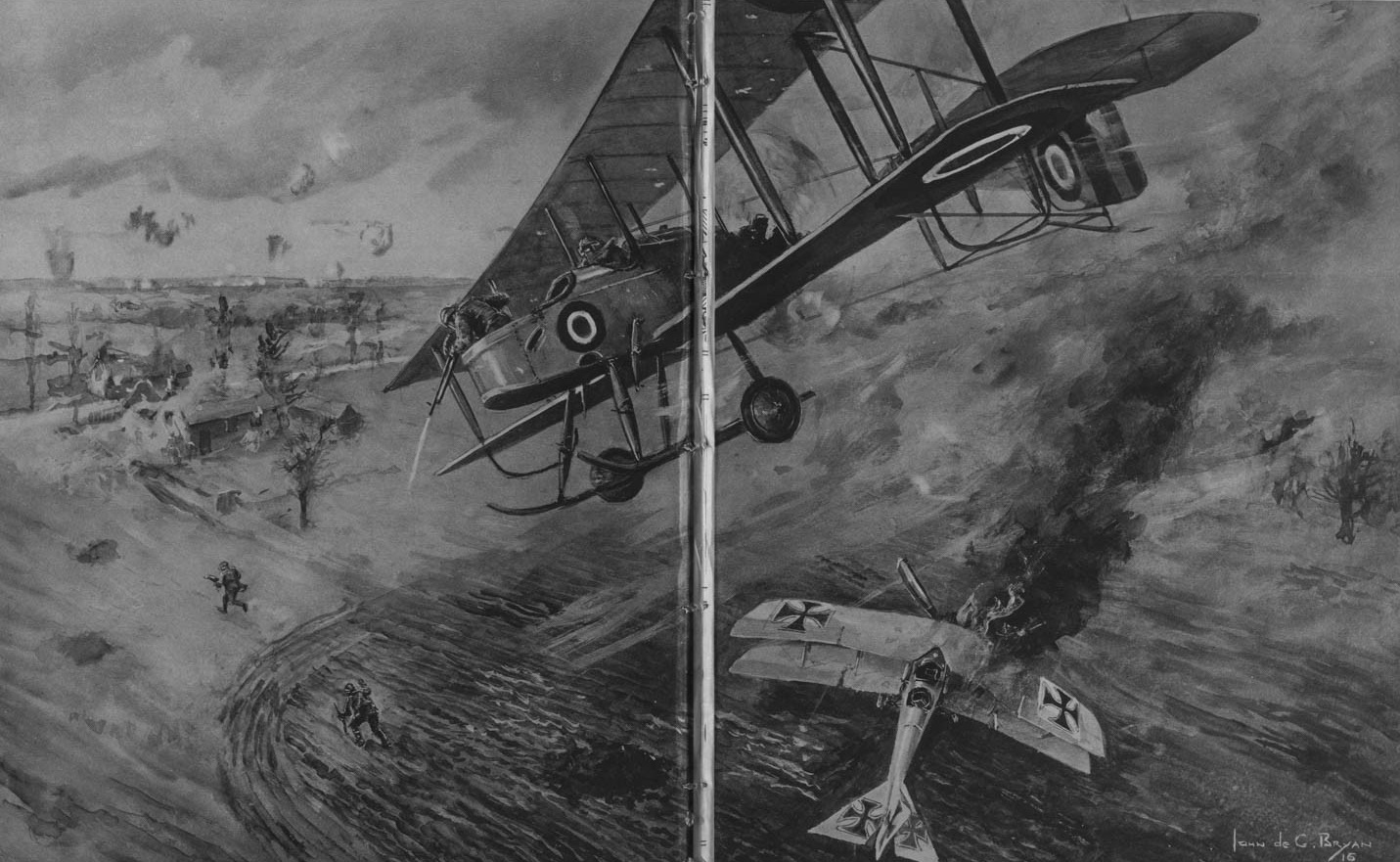
Action for which Gilbert Stuart Martin Insall is awarded VC

Group Captain Gilbert Stuart Martin Insall, VC, MC (14 May 1894 – 17 February 1972) was a British aviator and recipient of the Victoria Cross, the highest award for gallantry in the face of the enemy that can be awarded to British and Commonwealth subjects. He is the only person to have both won a Victoria Cross and escaped successfully from a German prisoner of war camp during the First World War.

== First World War ==
Insall was commissioned as a second lieutenant (on probation) in the Royal Flying Corps on 14 March 1915, during the First World War. He was appointed a Flying Officer in the RFC on 16 July, and was confirmed in his rank from the same date.

Insall was 21 years old, and a second lieutenant in the 11 Squadron, Royal Flying Corps when he won the Victoria Cross (VC).

On 7 November 1915 near Achiet-le-Grand, France, Second Lieutenant Insall, on patrol in Vickers F.B.5 Gunbus No. 5074 with 1st Class Air Mechanic T. H. Donald, engaged an Aviatik two-seater and forced the German pilot to make a rough landing in a ploughed field. Seeing the air crew scramble out and prepare to fire, Insall dived to 500 ft and his gunner opened fire, whereupon the Germans fled. After dropping an incendiary bomb on the downed German aircraft, Insall flew through heavy fire at 2000 ft over enemy trenches. The Vickers' petrol tank was hit, but Insall brought the plane 500 yards back inside Allied lines for an emergency landing. Insall and Donald stayed by the Gunbus through a bombardment of about 150 shells while awaiting nightfall. After dark, they then set to work by torch light to salvage their plane. After they repaired the machine overnight, Insall flew them back to base at dawn.

The announcement and accompanying citation for Insall's VC was published in a supplement to the London Gazette on 23 December 1915, reading:

For most conspicuous bravery, skill and determination, on 7 November 1915, in France. He was patrolling in a Vickers Fighting Machine, with First Class Air Mechanic T. H. Donald as gunner, when a German machine was sighted, pursued, and attacked near Achiet.

The German pilot led the Vickers machine over a rocket battery, but with great skill Lieutenant Insall dived and got to close range, when Donald fired a drum of cartridges into the German machine, stopping its engine. The German pilot then dived through a cloud, followed by Lieutenant Insall. Fire was again opened, and the German machine was brought down heavily in a ploughed field 4 miles south-east of Arras.

On seeing the Germans scramble out of their machine and prepare to fire, Lieutenant Insall dived to 500 feet, thus enabling Donald to open heavy fire on them. The Germans then fled, one helping the other, who was apparently wounded. Other Germans then commenced heavy fire, but in spite of this, Lieutenant Insall turned again, and an incendiary bomb was dropped on the German machine, which was last seen wreathed in smoke. Lieutenant Insall then headed west in order to get back over the German trenches, but as he was at only 2,000 feet altitude he dived across them for greater speed, Donald firing into the trenches as he passed over.

The German fire, however, damaged the petrol tank, and, with great coolness, Lieutenant Insall landed under cover of a wood 500 yards inside our lines. The Germans fired some 150 shells at our machine on the ground, but without causing material damage. Much damage had, however, been caused by rifle fire, but during the night it was repaired behind screened lights, and at dawn Lieutenant Insall flew his machine home with First Class Air Mechanic T. H. Donald as a passenger.

Insall could not personally receive his VC in 1915, however; he and Donald had fallen wounded into captivity on 14 December 1915 after engaging Hauptmann Martin Zander and his gunner. While in captivity, he was promoted to lieutenant, on 1 April 1916. Insall escaped on his third try, on 28 August 1917, and made it home over the Dutch border on 6 September. His VC was presented by the King on 27 September 1917. He returned to duty as the Flight Commander of "A" Flight, 50 Squadron, with the temporary rank of captain, on 11 January 1918.

== Royal Air Force career ==
After the war, Insall remained in the service, receiving a permanent commission as a Captain in the newly formed Royal Air Force. On 1 August 1919; his rank was regraded to Flight Lieutenant when the RAF adopted its new rank structure. He was promoted to Squadron Leader on 1 November. On 16 December, he was awarded the Military Cross (MC) for gallantry in escaping from captivity as a POW during the war.

On a clear day in 1925, he spotted a strange formation of pits in the ground below him. He took a photograph, and from this one photograph came the rediscovery of the Bronze Age site now known as Woodhenge two miles from Stonehenge (Crawford, Air-Photography for Archaeologists 1929). In 1929 he similarly discovered Arminghall Henge.

Insall served in Southern Mesopotamia (Iraq) against the Akhwan in 1927–1928, for which he was mentioned in despatches and awarded the General Service Medal (1918). As a Squadron Leader he was responsible for reforming No 35 Sqn which stood up on 1 March 1929 and served as its first Commanding Officer for three months until June 1929. He was promoted to Wing Commander shortly after on 1 July 1929 and took up the post of Station Commander at RAF Donibristle later that month. On 23 July 1932 he was appointed as Station Commander at RAF Upavon. On 15 May 1934 he moved to RAF Kenley, again filling the post of Station Commander. He was later promoted to Group Captain on 1 July 1935 and served overseas in the Middle East before returning to the UK in 1939 to fill the post of Officer Commanding No.3 RAF Depot at RAF Padgate from 1 April 1939. He served at this rank throughout the Second World War in a number of posts and finally retired from RAF service on 30 July 1945. Insall's headstone is in Nocton Churchyard, Lincolnshire. His Victoria Cross is displayed at the Royal Air Force Museum in Hendon.
