= RNAS Donibristle =

Former Royal Naval Air Station in Fife, Scotland

RNAS Donibristle HMS Merlin RNAY Donibristle RAF Donibristle
- Donibristle, Fife in Scotland

Site information
- Type: Royal Naval Air Station
- Owner: Air Ministry; Admiralty
- Operator: Royal Navy; Royal Air Force
- Controlled by: Fleet Air Arm; RAF Coastal Command
- Condition: Disused

Location
- Shown within Fife RNAS Donibristle (the United Kingdom)
- Coordinates: 56°02′27″N 003°20′57″W

Site history
- Built: 1917
- In use: 1917-23 October 1959
- Fate: Housing / Industry
- Battles/wars: European theatre of World War II; Cold War

Airfield information
- Elevation: 39 metres (128 ft) AMSL
Runways
Direction	Length and surface
08/26	731 metres (2,398 ft) Asphalt
10/28	868 metres (2,848 ft) Asphalt

Royal Naval Air Station Donibristle, commonly referred to as RNAS Donibristle; (commissioned HMS Merlin), was a former Royal Navy Naval Air Station located 2.7 miles (4.3 km) east of Rosyth, Fife, and 8.7 miles (14.0 km) northwest of Edinburgh.

It grew from an emergency landing ground first established in 1917 on the Earl of Moray's Donibristle Estate by 77 Sqn of the Royal Flying Corps and was transferred to Royal Naval Air Service control in September 1917 becoming a Aircraft Repair & Storage Depot.

On 1 April 1918 the Royal Naval Air Service merged with the Royal Flying Corps to create the Royal Air Force and Donibristle became a RAF Station between 1918 and 1939 operated by the Fleet Air Arm as part of RAF Coastal Area and later Coastal Command. During the interbellum Donibristle was an important centre of training for torpedo bomber crews with a number of new squadrons forming at the airfield.

On 24 May 1939, control of the Fleet Air Arm was returned to the Royal Navy and the airfield was renamed Royal Naval Air Station Donibristle (HMS Merlin). In addition to being an important shore base for training and disembarked naval aircraft units, a substantial Royal Naval Aircraft Repair Yard was developed in the North West corner of the airfield which employed a large civilian workforce alongside naval personnel. Over 7,000 aircraft were repaired and maintained at Donibristle during the Second World War.

Post war, Fleet Air Arm activity at Donibristle slowed considerably and HMS Merlin was eventually run down and paid off by the Royal Navy in November 1953. The Royal Naval Aircraft Yard continued to operate under the civilian contracted management of Airwork Ltd until April 1959 at which point the airfield site was completely closed. The land was sold to developers who created the Hillend and Donibristle Industrial Estates and the new town of Dalgety Bay. The first residents moved in to Dalgety Bay on 28 October 1965.

== Origins ==
The establishment of a military airfield at Donibristle can be traced back to the 1903 decision to build a major Royal Navy base at Rosyth as part of the Anglo-German Naval Arms Race. Construction of Rosyth Naval Dockyard began in 1909, with full operational status achieved in March 1916. Anchorages for the fleet were available in the Firth of Forth from 1914. It was from Rosyth that the Battle Cruiser Fleet under Vice Admiral David Beatty sailed to take part in the Battle of Jutland.

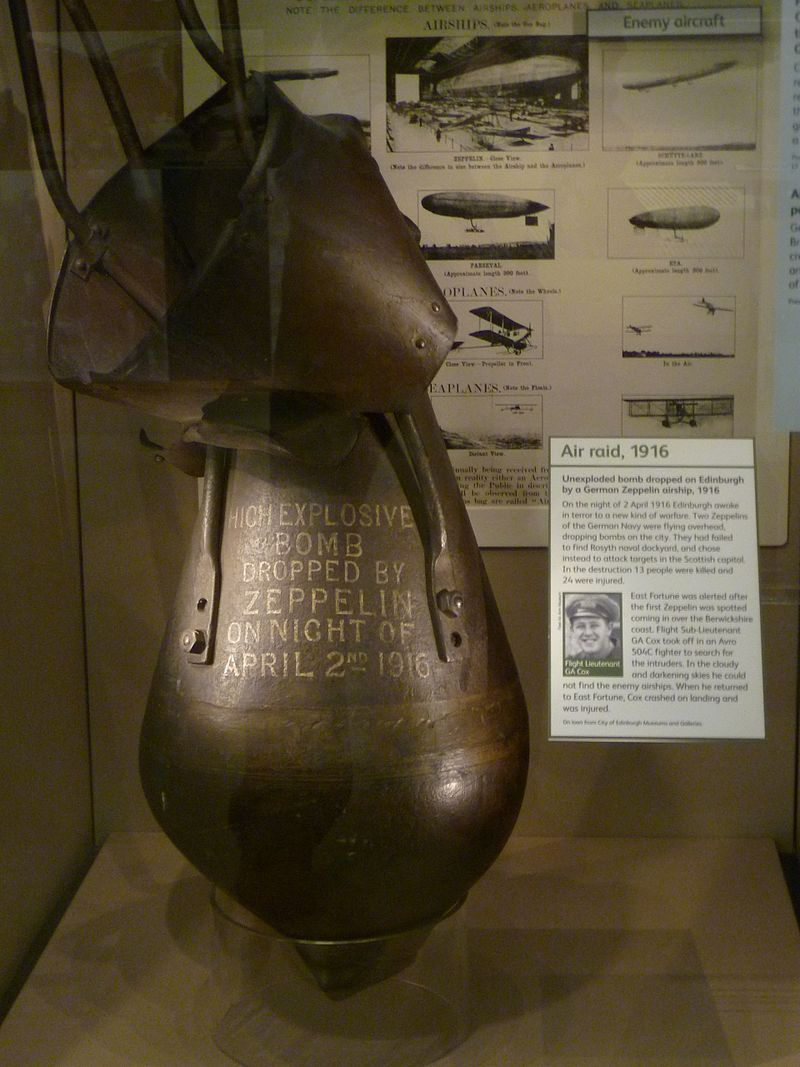
Unexploded bomb dropped over Edinburgh by Zeppelin airship on 2nd April 1916

On the night of 2/3 April 1916, two Zeppelin airships of the Imperial German Navy (L14/LZ 46 and L22/LZ 64) set out to bomb the naval vessels at anchor in the Firth of Forth and the Dockyard facilities at Rosyth. Deterred by defensive fire and searchlight glare, the airships instead opted to drop their bombs over Edinburgh and Leith. This resulted in 13 civilians killed and 24 wounded with over £77,000 in material damage (over £5.3 million today).

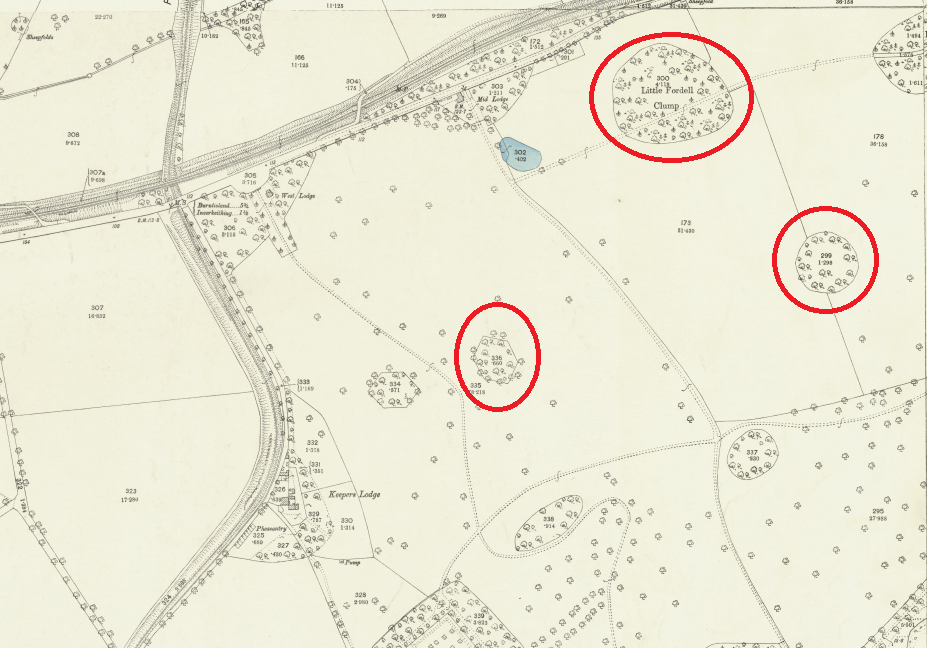
Period map showing the three plantations removed from the Earl of Moray's Donibristle Estate in early 1917 to create an emergency landing ground for the Royal Flying Corps

In response to the Zeppelin threat, a number of Home Defence Squadrons were based in the local area. One such unit was 77 Sqn of the Royal Flying Corps which flew the B.E.2 based at Turnhouse Aerodrome from October 1916. The first Commanding Officer of 77 Sqn, Major William Milne MC, was a close personal friend of Morton Gray Stuart, 17th Earl of Moray who had a substantial family estate at Donibristle situated on the North coast of the River Forth. The Earl was convinced to allow the establishment of a small emergency landing ground for 77 Sqn near to the estate's West Lodge Gates and Carriage Drive. This involved the removal of three small tree plantations to create a grass airstrip. The emergency landing ground was never actually used by the Royal Flying Corps and ownership was passed to the Royal Naval Air Service on 17 September 1917 where it was used initially for torpedo development trials.

As the First World War progressed, aircraft grew in importance both on land and sea. A letter dated 20 November 1917 from the Admiralty to Admiral Beatty, who had since been appointed as Commander of the Grand Fleet, explains that due to the decision to equip all light and battle cruisers with aircraft, there would be a need for extensive shore based support facilities to be established. Donibristle, located just a few miles along the coast from the Naval Base at Rosyth and opposite the fleet anchorages in the Firth of Forth, was ideally situated for development to meet this need.

== RNAS Donibristle (1917-1918) ==
Initial accommodation at Donibristle in September 1917 consisted of just two portable Armstrong canvas huts, a portable latrine and a range of corrugated buildings including a kitchen, ablutions, meat store, dry store and a guard hut.

Approval was soon given by the Admiralty to develop the site into a RNAS Aircraft Repair Depot, this included the erection of a single aircraft shed measuring 200' x 100' and accommodation for ten officers and 115 ratings. This was deemed insufficient to meet demand and a second 200' x 100' aircraft shed was soon approved together with aircraft and engine workshops and a commensurate increase in domestic facilities to accommodate 50 officers and 400 ratings. Admiral Beatty wrote to the Admiralty on 28 November 1917 to request a third 200' x 100' aircraft shed as The Grand Fleet, soon to be based entirely at Rosyth, would be putting to sea with over 100 aircraft by the summer of 1918.

On 10 December 1917 the Admiralty wrote to the War Office requesting permission to construct a railway line and to extend a pier in connection with the launching and recovery of seaplanes. This railway line was originally proposed to be built eastwards to the recently constructed pier serving the Braefoot Battery, however a westerly route was approved and a two mile long standard gauge line terminating at East Ness Pier in Inverkeithing Bay was completed in 1920. An AB Locomotive named RAF No.1 was delivered new to the aerodrome in 1920 and housed in its own shed. It continued to operate on the line until 1951.

== RAF Donibristle (1918) ==
The Grand Fleet moved to Rosyth in April 1918 following enhancements to anti-submarine defences in the Firth of Forth. On 1 April 1918 the Royal Naval Air Service merged with the Royal Flying Corps to create the world's first fully independent air force thereafter known as the Royal Air Force. All existing RNAS aircraft, personnel and shore facilities were transferred to the RAF with the airfield site becoming RAF Station Donibristle (known affectionally as Donibee) under the command of Major F A Hooper (Squadron Leader from 1 August 1919 when new RAF ranks were introduced). The airfield continued to be used as a trials base for torpedo development.

In October 1918 the airfield was redesignated as the Fleet Aircraft Acceptance Depot and shortly after the Fleet Aircraft Repair Depot. At the end of hostilities on 11 November 1918, RAF Donibristle consisted of the following

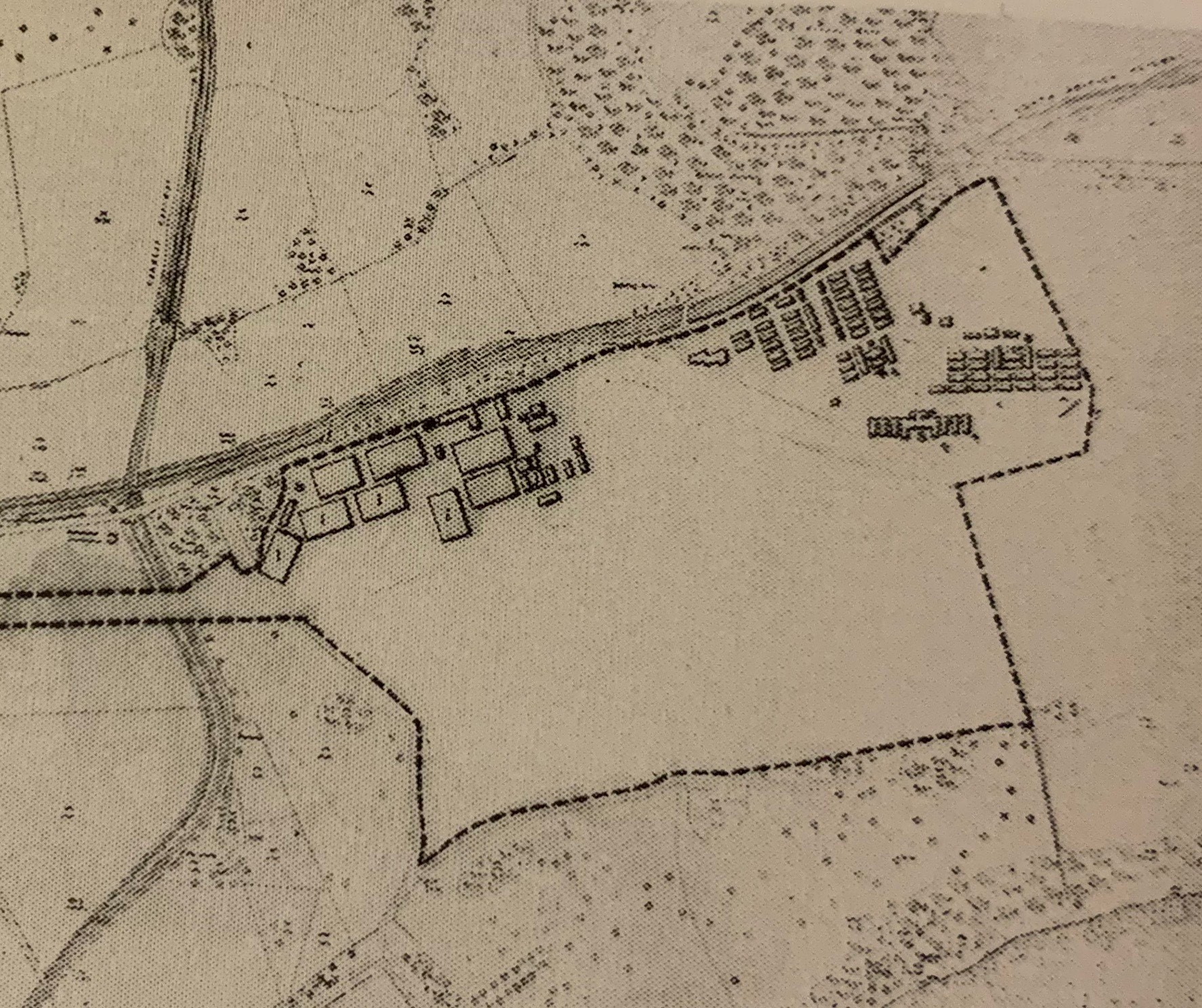
Airfield plan of RAF Donibristle circa 1918

- 4x Aircraft Sheds
- 1x Erecting Shed
- 1x General Store
- 1x Large Workshop
- 1x Blacksmiths Shop
- 1x Dope Shop
- Bomb Store
- Magazine & Firing Butt
- Photographers Studio
- Officers Mess
- Accommodation and domestic support for 400 Airmen and NCOs

== RAF Donibristle - Inter War Years (1918-1939) ==
In the immediate post war years, RAF Donibristle was primarily employed maintaining and overhauling aircraft from the shore base at RAF Leuchars and aircraft from ships of the fleet. It was renamed as the Aircraft Repair Depot from September 1919 to March 1920. It was also responsible for scrapping a large number of aircraft now considered surplus due to the end of the war and converting a number of DH.9s for employment as 3 seater fleet spotters.

Following the end of hostilities, the Earl of Moray was rather reluctant to sell his land to the Air Ministry permanently and expressed a desire regain ownership of the land. Until then it had only been a temporary tenancy arrangement under the Defence of the Realm Act 1914. However, he was persuaded that no other location would be suitable for this important shore base and the sale was finally completed in 1923 with the Air Ministry becoming sole owner occupiers from 1924. Reasons listed by the Air Ministry included - close proximity to fleet anchorages, good rail and road links for transportation of aircraft and stores and centrally located between other establishments working with naval assets.

On 3 November 1919, Wing Commander Richard Pink took command at Donibristle, which became known as the Coastal Area Aircraft Depot (CAAD) from March 1920. Pink, who later became an Air Commodore, is famous as the only individual to have a military campaign named after him - Pink's War. An article in the Edinburgh Evening News on 24 June 1920 reported that the station was built at a cost of £300,000 with another £250,000 required to complete. The article also lists aircraft types based at Donibristle as including the Sopwith Camel, the de Havilland DH.9 and the Parnall Panther. During this period RAF Donibristle had its own farm with labour provided by local civilians. The farm fulfilled the stations full requirements for eggs and milks with vegetables grown by the farm distributed to NAAFI units all over Scotland.

In April 1921 personnel from RAF Donibristle were deployed to Renfrew and Newcastle aerodromes to support the civilian authorities during the Coal Strikes and are recorded as having "unpleasant experiences". In anticipation of local trouble at Donibristle, an armoured car was provided which mounted five machine guns. This was further protected by barbed wire and netting. The strikes quickly came to an end due to lack of support from the allied National Transport Workers' Federation and National Union of Railwaymen.

Post war downsizing of the Royal Air Force eventually caught up with RAF Donibristle and on 31 October 1922 the station was reduced to a Care and Maintenance basis with only a skeleton staff in residence. On 1 April 1924, the Fleet Air Arm of the Royal Air Force was formed, encompassing those RAF units that would normally be embarked on aircraft carriers and fighting ships.

On 15 July 1925 the station was reactivated as part of RAF Coastal Area as a shore base for Fleet Air Arm aircraft under the command of Squadron Leader Thomas Wilfrid Elsdon. Manpower was initially bolstered by the transfer of 300 airman from RAF Leuchars. The first flying units to be permanently based at RAF Donibristle following its reactivation were the Fairey Flycatchers of 405 Fleet Fighter Flight (later to become 803 Naval Air Squadron in 1933) and 406 Fleet Fighter Flight who arrived in early October 1925 with 401 Fleet Fighter Flight arriving towards the end of the month. Several other Flycatcher units formed at Donibristle including 407 Fleet Fighter Flight on 1 September 1927 and 408 Fleet Fighter Flight on 30 March 1929. These units spent varying periods aboard aircraft carriers of the fleet and shore based at Donibristle.

The 30 October 1927 saw a change of command with Squadron Leader Frank Fowler DSC DFC assuming the post of Station Commander. On 1 October 1928 the Coast Defence Torpedo Flight at Donibristle was renamed 36 Squadron and equipped with the Hawker Horsley. This unit was specially formed to introduce and develop the new role of dropping torpedoes from shore based aircraft.

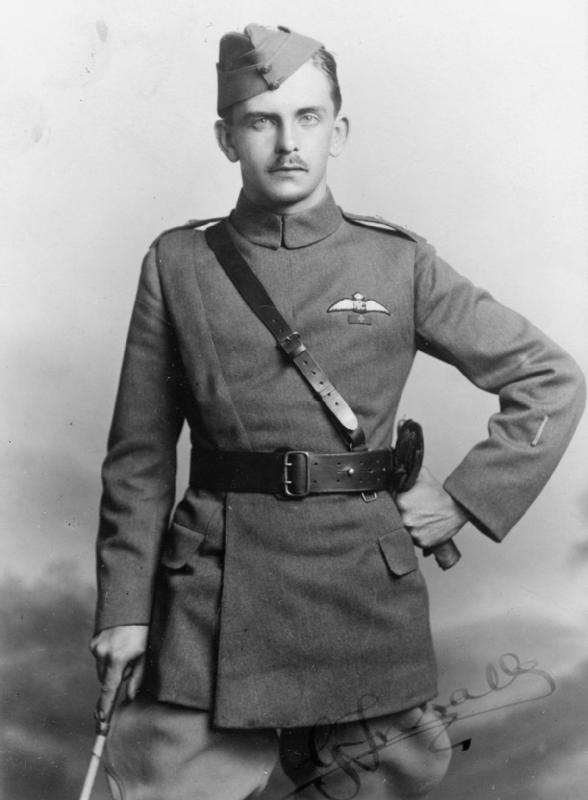
Lieutenant Gilbert Stuart Martin Insall VC

Another change of command took place on 28 January 1929 with Squadron Leader Claud W Mackay DSC DFC taking post as Station Commander. This was a short posting as he was soon replaced on 10 July 1929 by Wing Commander Gilbert Stuart Martin Insall VC MC. Insall was a 21 year old Second Lieutenant in the Royal Flying Corps when he was awarded the Victoria Cross following an action on 7 November 1915 flying a Vickers F.B.5 Gunbus. Wing Commander Insall's tenure as Station Commander ended in June 1932 with Wing Commander John V Steel OBE taking post from 1 July 1932. This followed his return from service with RAF Iraq Command where he was Personal Staff Officer to the AOC Air Vice Marshal Edgar Ludlow-Hewitt.

36 Sqn deployed to Singapore in November 1930 and its role at Donibristle was taken over by 100 Squadron who relocated from RAF Spitalgate on 3 November 1930 to convert from conventional bombing to retrain as a torpedo bomber unit. For the next two years 100 Squadron Horsleys were regularly engaged in making dummy torpedo attacks on Royal Navy warships entering or leaving the Firth of Forth. In November 1932, 100 Squadron swapped its Horsleys for the new and far superior Vickers Vildebeest, being the first unit to reequip with this new purpose-built torpedo bomber and introduce it to RAF service. Like its predecessor, 100 Squadron was eventually posted overseas to Singapore. The Vildebeests were flown to RAF Sealand to be packed for shipment whilst personnel marched out from Donibristle on the evening of 7 December 1933 headed by the 603 Auxiliary Air Force Squadron Pipe Band. They travelled by special train from Inverkeithing to Tilbury Docks where they boarded the SS Ranpura. Sadly, 100 Sqn was still operating the by then obsolete Vildebeest when Imperial Japanese forces invaded culminating with the Fall of Singapore in February 1942. The unit suffered heavy losses and despite attempts to combine with 36 Sqn in an attempt to remain operational, most surviving personnel became prisoners of war and endured horrific treatment.

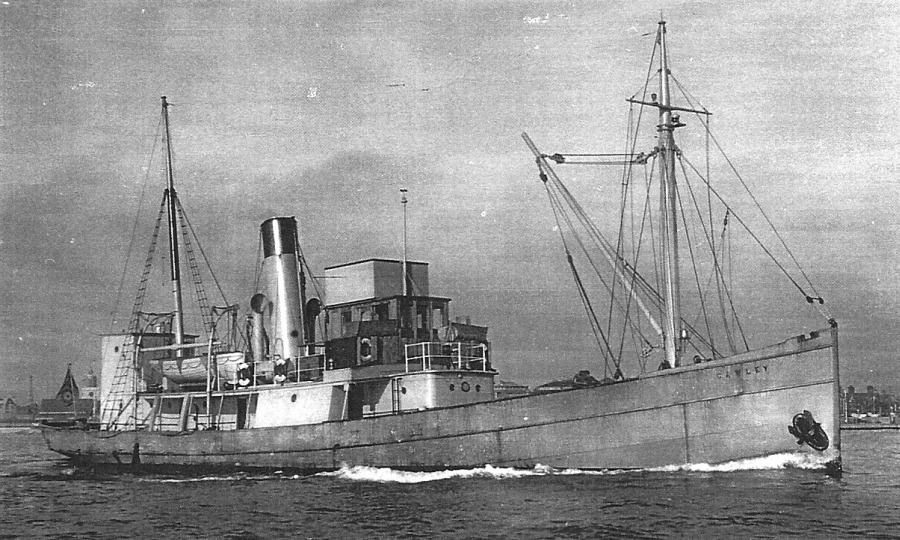
RAFA Commander Cawley

The Marine Section was based at East Ness Pier in Inverkeithing Bay. In 1932 this consisted of one trawler called the Royal Air Force Auxiliary (RAFA) Commander Cawley, two speedboats and three motorboats under the command of a Marine Craft Officer at Station HQ. The trawler acted as a safety ship and sometimes recovered torpedoes which was the primary role of the speedboats. Dummy torpedoes were dropped about 5 miles to the east of the Forth Bridge whereas those fitted with engines and gyroscopes were used in Largo Bay some 18 miles to the east. When a torpedo was recovered it was taken to East Ness Pier and unloaded using a steam crane which was primarily used to haul seaplanes out of the water. The torpedoes were then placed on wagons for transport along the 2 mile long Air Ministry railway line to the workshops at RAF Donibristle.

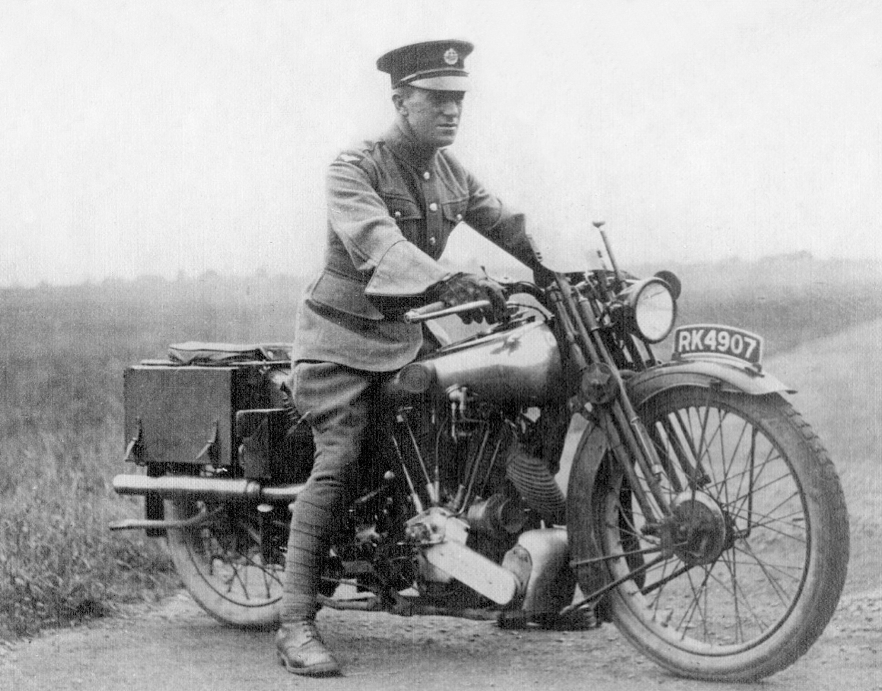
T.E. Lawrence in RAF uniform as Aircraftsman Shaw

In 1932 Aircraftsman by the name of 'Shaw' visited the Marine Section as part of his work developing fast motor launches as sea plane tenders and rescue boats. This was in fact none other than Colonel T. E. Lawrence DSO (of Arabia fame) who had enlisted in the Royal Air Force under an assumed name. He had originally joined in the RAF in 1922 under the name John Hume Ross and was interviewed by Recruiting Officer Flying Officer W.E. Johns (author of the Biggles series of novels). Lawrence was forced out of the RAF after his true identity was discovered in 1923 but rejoined in 1925 under the name Shaw and served a full 10-year enlistment. With an interest in fast boats, Lawrence had eventually joined the RAF Marine Branch. He arrived at Inverkeithing Bay in one such boat after a voyage of around 700 miles, during which he had visited a number of other RAF coastal stations. After a two-week stay at Donibristle, during which time he evaluated the motor launches used as seaplane tenders, he departed by train. His work directly contributed towards the development of the ST 200 Seaplane Tender mk1 and the High Speed Launch which saved the lives of many downed aircrew.

The gap left at RAF Donibristle by the departure of 100 Squadron was filled by the Torpedo Training Flight which arrived on 15 January 1934 with six Vildebeests. Its role was to train crews to relieve those deployed to the torpedo bomber squadrons in the Far East. In May of the same year 22 Squadron was reformed at Donibristle with six Vildebeests with the Earl of Moray granting permission for the unit to use his crest as their own. During the same month RAF Donibristle opened its gates to the public for the very first Empire Air Day Display on 24 May 1934.

In 1936 the RAF went under a significant reorganisation as part of various expansion schemes enacted to meet the threat posed by German rearmament. The former 'Area' formations were now to be called Commands. The former Fighter and Bomber Areas became Fighter Command and Bomber Command and Coastal Area was renamed Coastal Command. Its headquarters was located at Lee-on-Solent. Air Marshal Sir Arthur Longmore, Air Officer Commanding (AOC) RAF Coastal Area oversaw the renaming and handed over command to Air Marshal Philip Joubert de la Ferté on 24 August 1936. Thus RAF Donibristle became part of No 16 (Reconnaissance) Group, Coastal Command. From 1 September 1936 the Station Commander was Wing Commander Harvey Lancelot Macro DFC AFC. His citation for the Air Force Cross reads

″On the 22nd February 1924, a seaplane, which this officer was piloting, was damaged in the air by an aeroplane under wireless control. By his presence of mind, coolness and skill, he avoided a direct collision, and thereby prevented his machine being totally wrecked. Later he flew his seaplane back to his base, and in spite of the fact that the tail plane and elevator were damaged he landed safely. His handling of his machine throughout was a very fine piece of airmanship.″

In April 1938, RAF Donibristle transferred to 17 (Training) Group and became a training base for the Hawker Osprey fighters of 801 Naval Air Squadron and the new Fairey Swordfish Torpedo Bombers of 811 Naval Air Squadron and 822 Naval Air Squadron. The final Royal Air Force Station Commander at Donibristle was Wing Commander Bertrand A Malet DFC who took post from 5 December 1938 until the station was transferred to Royal Navy control on 24 May 1939. Wing Commander Malet then moved to a Signals post at HQ 18 Group which had just that month moved to the nearby RAF Pitreavie Castle.

== RNAS Donibristle - HMS Merlin (1939-1959) ==
On 24 May 1939 RAF Donibristle was taken over by the Royal Navy as Royal Naval Air Station Donibristle when all Fleet Air Arm assets were returned to Admiralty control. In naval tradition, all shore bases are known as stone frigate's and are considered ships. Consequently, RNAS Donibristle was commissioned as HMS Merlin under the command of Captain H J Johnstone. Of five Fleet Air Arm airfields handed over to the Royal Navy, Donibristle was the only one in Scotland. It became second only in importance to RNAS Lee-on-Solent (HMS Daedalus) - the HQ base of the Fleet Air Arm. A relief landing ground for RNAS Donibristle was created with RNAS Crail (HMS Jackdaw) being commissioned on 1 October 1940. When RNAS Crail opened, much of the training function moved to this location but Donibristle continued to contribute to this role throughout the Second World War.

During the Second World War RNAS Donibristle provided a temporary base for a large number of front line squadrons and hosted several resident training and second line units. In December 1940, a relatively unknown Naval Lieutenant was based at HMS Merlin and served with 802 Naval Air Squadron. This Lieutenant went on to become test pilot Captain Eric 'Winkle' Brown CBE, DSC, AFC, FRAeS. Captain Brown currently holds the world record for the greatest number of aircraft types flown by a pilot. His total of 487 only covers basic aircraft types and does not include different marks. For example, he has flown 14 different marks of the Spitfire but this is only counted as one aircraft type in the list.

At Donibristle, Winkle converted from the Gloster Gladiator biplane to the Grumman Martlet (the British version of the American F4F Wildcat). On one occasion, an oil leak caused Winkle to put his Martlet down in Burntisland Reservoir but special floatation bags in the wings kept him afloat and the aircraft was salvaged. In January 1941 Winston Churchill visited HMS Merlin and a special air display was arranged for the occasion. Winkle was supposed to do a roll on take-off but an engine failure caused him to crash upside down into the Firth of Forth. Once again the floatation bags did their job and he escaped with just a broken nose after hitting it off the gunsight. On 14 May 1941 Winkle left Donibristle bound for Croydon so that some improvements could be made to the Martlet's safety harness. Bad weather forced him to stop off at RAF Cranwell on route. Whilst at Cranwell he witnessed the maiden flight of Britain's first ever jet fighter – the Gloster E.28/39 on 15 May 1941. 802 Naval Air Squadron left Donibristle in July 1941 with Winkle joining a detachment aboard the Empire Audacity, a captured German Liner which had been converted into a new type of escort carrier carrying 8 Martlets.

As the airfield had previously been associated with the repair and storage of naval aircraft during the First World War, it was a logical step for Donibristle to become the site of a Royal Naval Aircraft Repair Yard (RNAY) during the Second World War. During 1939/1940 an autonomous aircraft repair yard was developed in the North West corner of the airfield site. This was manned by a mix of Royal Navy engineers and civilian workers. Its main task was to perform major maintenance on all types Fleet Air Arm aircraft and the overhaul of aircraft engines. In 1940 there were 500 military personnel and 450 civilian workers employed by the yard. By 1944 this had risen to 1000 military personnel and 2000 civilian workers. Over 7,000 aircraft of more than 80 types passed through the repair yard during the Second World War.

782 Naval Air Squadron reformed at HMS Merlin on 1 December 1940 from a Communication Flight first established on 1 July 1940 with aircrews from Jersey Airways who had escaped German occupation. The civilian aircrew were commissioned into the Royal Navy Volunteer Reserve (RNVR). 782 became known as the Northern Communications Squadron, flying regular scheduled flights between naval airfields in mainland Scotland, the islands and Northern Ireland. All of 782's aircraft bore the name Merlin on the fuselage with successive numbers. The squadron was the only resident flying squadron at HMS Merlin and finally disbanded at Donibristle on 9 October 1953 after over 13 years. From 1953 to 1958 the aircraft were operated for a further 5 years by civilian pilots working for Airwork Ltd.

On 1 March 1943 Captain Henry Cecil Bovell CB CBE DSO took post as Station Commander. He had been appointed as a Commander of the Order of the British Empire whilst commanding the aircraft carrier HMS Victorious in the operation leading to the sinking of the German battleship Bismark. He received the Distinguished Service Order for command of the same ship during Operation Pedestal. Shortly after taking post he was promoted to Commodore and assumed the post of Second in Command Naval Air Stations & Commodore Naval Air Stations (North). Bovell was succeeded in this post on 17 March 1944 by Commodore Arthur Robin Moore Bridge CBE who would later serve as Naval Aide-de-camp to King George VI and receive a knighthood.

During the post war years, from September 1945, the post of Second in Command Naval Air Stations & Commodore Naval Air Stations (North) was renamed Flag Officer, Flying Training. This was the senior naval officer responsible for all flying training within the Fleet Air Arm. The post was elevated to the rank of Rear Admiral and incumbents continued to be based at Donibristle. Those holding the post before HMS Merlin was paid off in 1953 were:

Rear-Admiral Lachlan Donald Mackintosh CB DSO DSC and 29th Chief of Clan Mackintosh (September 1945 – September 1947)

Rear-Admiral Charles Lambe CB CVO (September 1947 – August 1949)

Rear-Admiral Edmund Anstice CB (August 1949 – August 1951)

Rear-Admiral Walter Couchman CVO OBE DSO(August 1951 – June 1953)

On 17 January 1947 Captain Graham Henry Stokes CB DSC took post as Station Commander. His Distinguished Service Cross had been awarded whilst in command of HMS Sikh for participation in the operation leading to the sinking of the German battleship Bismark. Immediately prior to taking post he had been Commanding Officer of the aircraft carrier HMS Colossus, this followed a two-year post as Station Commander at another Fife airfield - RNAS Crail (HMS Jackdaw).

The last operational unit to be based at the airfield was 1830A Naval Air Squadron, an Anti-Submarine RNVR unit flying the Fairey Firefly, which formed at HMS Merlin on 1 October 1952 and left on 1 November 1952.

The last Fleet Air Arm aircraft to visit HMS Merlin during the Second World War were the Curtis Helldivers of 1820 Naval Air Squadron in December 1944. Following VE Day aircraft movements through Donibristle declined dramatically, with only the communication aircraft of 782 Squadron in residence. Twelve squadrons were briefly based at HMS Merlin in the post war years, flying the Fairey Firefly, Grumman Avenger, Supermarine Seafire and Hawker Sea Fury. A large number of Sea Fury's were stored at the airfield awaiting disposal.

The resident 782 Naval Air Squadron was disbanded on 9 October 1953 and HMS Merlin was finally run down and paid off in November 1953. Captain M J Clift performed this duty as the last Station Commander at Donibristle. The barrack blocks continued to be used up until 1963 for naval artificers training at Rosyth under the name HMS Cochrane.

Airwork Ltd operated the aircraft repair yard with a staff of 1200 civilian workers between 1953 and 1959. During this time aircraft such as the Supermarine Seafire, Harvard, Hawker Sea Fury, Blackburn Firebrand, Douglas Skyraider and Fairey Gannet were overhauled as well as early helicopters such as the Westland Dragonfly and Westland Whirlwind. The final aircraft to be reconditioned at Donibristle was a Douglas Skyraider AEW.1 (WT950) which left for 849 Naval Air Squadron at RNAS Culdrose in January 1959. In April 1959, just three months after WT950 left Donibristle, the repair yard and Donibristle airfield were closed for good and the site was formally paid off and sold on 23 October 1959.

== Dalgety Bay (1962 to Present) ==
Following the closure of Donibristle airfield, the Board of Trade developed 54 acres of the site as Donibristle Industrial Estate which opened in 1962. Followed in 1965 by Hillend Industrial Estate developed by Fife County Council.

With the Northern part of the airfield site earmarked for industry, proposals were made to redevelop the rest of the former airfield site as a new residential town. The 19th Earl of Moray had re-acquired a large part of the old family estate from the Admiralty in 1959. A company, Copthall Holdings Developments Ltd was formed to draw up plans, with the Earl's son (and future 20th Earl) as one of the Directors.

Planning permission for the new town of Dalgety Bay was obtained in April 1961, with the basic services and roads constructed in 1964/65. The first show home opened for viewings in 1965. On 28 October 1965 the first residents moved in, with house prices ranging from £3,000 to £7,000.

Dalgety Bay was on the map...

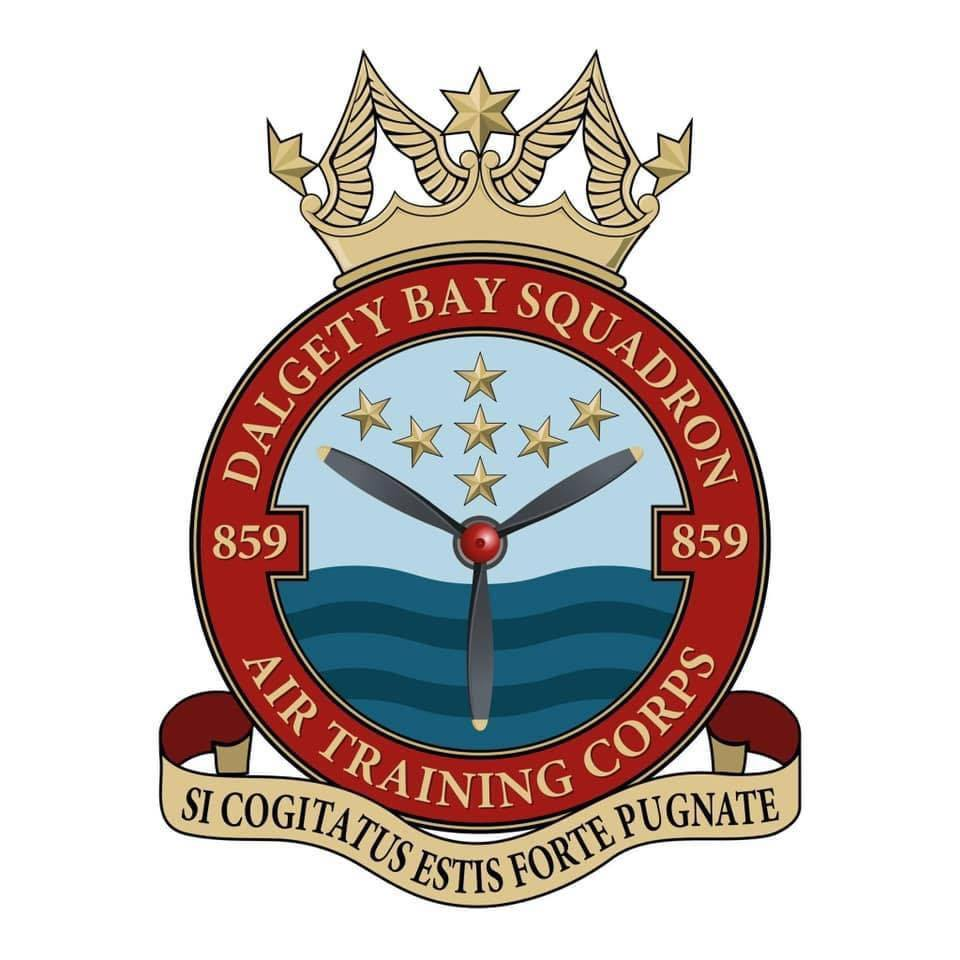
Unit badge for 859 (Dalgety Bay) Squadron, Air Training Corps.

Aviation heritage on the former airfield site is maintained through 859 (Dalgety Bay) Squadron of the Air Training Corps, part of the wider Royal Air Force Air Cadets. The Air Training Corps are a uniformed youth organisation sponsored by the Royal Air Force. It provides air, space and cyber centered training to local youths aged 12–20. The unit was formed in the early 1980s and have their HQ amongst the former airfield barrack blocks built in 1917 which still stand over 100 years later. The squadron badge includes seven gold stars, which commemorates the 7,000 aircraft repaired maintained and dispatched from RNAS Donibristle between 1939 - 1945.

== Units Based at Donibristle ==
Royal Air Force

- No. 22 Squadron RAF
- No. 36 Squadron RAF
- No. 42 Squadron RAF
- No. 100 Squadron RAF
- No. 271 Squadron RAF
- 'D' Flight of No. 2 Anti-Aircraft Co-operation Unit RAF (April 1940 - March 1941)
- No. 16 Group Practice Flight RAF (August 1937 - June 1938)
- No. 18 (Reconnaissance) Group RAF (27 September 1938 - 11 October 1938 & 21 October 1938 - 20 May 1939)
- No. 29 (Fleet) Group RAF (21 June 1921 - 31 March 22)
- Torpedo Training Flight RAF (January - May 1934) absorbed by No. 22 Sqn
- No. 401 (Fleet Fighter) Flight RAF
- No. 404 (Fleet Fighter) Flight RAF
- No. 404A (Fleet Fighter) Flight RAF
- No. 404B (Fleet Fighter) Flight RAF
- No. 405 (Fleet Fighter) Flight RAF
- No. 406 (Fleet Fighter) Flight RAF
- No. 407 (Fleet Fighter) Flight RAF
- No. 408 (Fleet Fighter) Flight RAF
- No. 420 (Fleet Spotter) Flight RAF
- No. 423 (Fleet Spotter) Flight RAF
- No. 441 (Fleet Reconnaissance) Flight RAF
- No. 464 (Fleet Torpedo) Flight RAF
- Coastal Area Aircraft Depot (September 1919 - March 1922)

Fleet Air Arm

- 700 Naval Air Squadron
- 701 Naval Air Squadron
- 739 Naval Air Squadron
- 758 Naval Air Squadron
- 767 Naval Air Squadron
- 769 Naval Air Squadron
- 770 Naval Air Squadron
- 771 Naval Air Squadron
- 780 Naval Air Squadron
- 782 Naval Air Squadron
- 784 Naval Air Squadron
- 800 Naval Air Squadron
- 801 Naval Air Squadron
- 802 Naval Air Squadron
- 803 Naval Air Squadron
- 804 Naval Air Squadron
- 805 Naval Air Squadron
- 806 Naval Air Squadron
- 807 Naval Air Squadron
- 808 Naval Air Squadron
- 810 Naval Air Squadron
- 811 Naval Air Squadron
- 812 Naval Air Squadron
- 813 Naval Air Squadron
- 814 Naval Air Squadron
- 816 Naval Air Squadron
- 817 Naval Air Squadron
- 819 Naval Air Squadron
- 820 Naval Air Squadron
- 821 Naval Air Squadron
- 822 Naval Air Squadron
- 823 Naval Air Squadron
- 824 Naval Air Squadron
- 825 Naval Air Squadron
- 827 Naval Air Squadron
- 828 Naval Air Squadron
- 830 Naval Air Squadron
- 860 Naval Air Squadron
- 881 Naval Air Squadron
- 882 Naval Air Squadron
- 884 Naval Air Squadron
- 886 Naval Air Squadron
- 888 Naval Air Squadron
- 890 Naval Air Squadron
- 891 Naval Air Squadron
- 892 Naval Air Squadron
- 893 Naval Air Squadron
- 1770 Naval Air Squadron
- 1820 Naval Air Squadron
- 1830 Naval Air Squadron
- 'A' Flight of 1830 Naval Air Squadron
- 1841 Naval Air Squadron
- 1842 Naval Air Squadron
- Aircraft Repair Depot
- Fleet Aircraft Acceptance Depot
- Fleet Aircraft Repair Depot

== Radioactive Contamination ==
=== Discovery ===
Radioactive material was first detected on a part of the foreshore at Dalgety Bay in 1990 as a result of routine environmental monitoring undertaken by the nearby naval base at Rosyth as a part of the permit conditions. An object recovered from the beach was returned to the Rosyth dockyard laboratory for analysis and was found to contain Radium-226, which is unrelated to dockyard activities.

=== Investigation ===
An investigation by the Scottish Environment Protection Agency (SEPA) concluded that luminising of aircraft instrument dials using paint containing Radium-226 was routinely undertaken at HMS Merlin. This was common practice at such sites and is supported by witness statements. It is also understood that solid wastes arising from this practice were incinerated and disposed on site. Again this was common practice and witness statements recount the burning of dials and other cockpit parts with ashes being disposed near the shore.

The SEPA Report reviewed historic aerial photographs of the site along with historic OS maps. These indicate the presence of a deposit of material in 1945 on the shore to the east of New Harbour which is later mapped as a refuse tip by OS in 1963/64. A second area mapped as a refuse tip by the same date is located at what is now Sealstrand. Both appear to be connected to what was the Salvage Section on the airbase. The operations of the airfield included the provision of an area for repair, maintenance and salvage. The site also had an incinerator located in the northern area of the airfield amongst the Repair Yard Buildings. HMS Merlin included a Salvage Section which consisted of a number of buildings in the south east of the airfield, between the location of houses on the Wynd and the area where Dalgety Bay Sailing Club is currently situated.

A document dated 27 February 1943 details that the estate roads have been severely damaged by the Salvage Section's (‘salvage village’) heavy transport and that either repair to existing roads is required or that new ‘taxi track’ be laid. Another document details the visit of the Civil Lord of the Admiralty on 18 June 1943. As part of this visit the Salvage Section was reviewed and was described as “primitive and seems to be mainly constructed out of local salvage material”. In July of that year documents detail that the Donibristle site will be included in the UK wide review of Naval Aircraft Salvage Sections detailing that additional Sections will be required and existing ones improved.

The 1945 aerial photograph shows a fan shaped area of deposited material east of New Harbour. On later maps this is labelled as a Refuse Tip (1964 1:2,500 OS map) and Refuse Tip (disused) (1970 1:2,500 OS map). A Refuse Tip is also annotated on the 1964 1:2,500 OS map in the location of what is currently Sealstrand, approximately half way along. This area is labelled as a Slaughter House and old sandstone quarry in the earliest map reviewed (1856). By 1896/7 the quarry is labelled as a pond. This feature remains until approximately 1959 whereby the aerial photograph shows the pond feature to be infilled. In the 1963/64 1:2,500 OS map the refuse tip is labelled and it surrounds the western and northern sides of a pond feature. By 1967 (1:10,560 OS map) the whole of the pond feature is annotated with the symbol for refuse or slag heap. The 1970 1:2,500 OS map no longer shows this feature indicating that ts has possibly been completely infilled or overgrown. Both of the above areas, later labelled as refuse tips, are connected to the Salvage Section by tracks. The track to the tip at Sealstrand is evident on the 1945 aerial photograph and is now part of the coastal path. The track leading to the tip at the Headland is also present in the 1945 aerial photograph and is still used for informal access to the Sailing Club.

A number of witness statements taken by SEPA describe disposal operations from the airbase:

A witness statement covering the period between 1943 and 1944 confirms that the Donibristle site was disposing of building materials as well as aircraft parts on site at this time.

A further witness statement confirms that incineration of instruments panels from planes was occurring on site in 1946. Mounds of ash were being created by this practice with incomplete destruction of some of the dials as these were visible within the ash. This statement also confirms that the majority of the planes stored in the dispersal areas had the instrument panels removed. It also confirms that the ash from incineration was being deposited on site in close proximity to the shore although the exact position of the mound of ash in this case cannot be discerned.

Another witness statement covering the period 1953-1958 describes disposal of luminising paint. Following luminising paint bottles were disposed of in the dustbin. These were collected every morning by a wagon and taken down over the runway and down the hill, where the bay is, to the tip. All types of waste were dumped and each section had their own transport for taking waste to the tip.

=== Radium Sources ===
Radium-226 was used to make articles like instrument dials glow through the emission of radiation. It has a half-life of 1,600 years – which means that every 1,600 years the activity is halved.

Radioactive sources at Dalgety Bay have been found in the form of fine sand-sized grains, larger half-brick sized pieces or discrete objects, such as dials. Some of the sources removed from the foreshore would have resulted in a radiation burn to the skin if touched.

Radium-226 decays into Polonium 210 and Lead 210 which are very hazardous if ingested. A SEPA study into the potential health showed that some of the contamination had much higher solubility in stimulated stomach acid than expected. It is believed that this is due to the burning of the radium-226 to form oxides. This meant that some of the sources would cause very significant health impacts if ingested.

The remediation work has resulted in the MOD's contractor removing over 6,500 radioactive particles from a few hundred metres of coastline, in addition to the sources SEPA and previous contractors removed.

Overall, it is estimated that over 12,000 radioactive particles have been removed from the Dalgety Bay coastline with particle activities ranging from less than 1,000 Becquerels (less than 1,000 Bq) to over 76,000,000 Bq.

=== Remediation Works ===
The MOD undertook a comprehensive intrusive and investigative survey of the Dalgety Bay area and was able to show that there were large deposits of ashy material along the coastline which contained radioactive contaminants. Aerial photography was used to assess the advancement of the coastline through the emplacement of this ashy material. These data allowed the development of a remediation plan for Dalgety Bay by the MOD.

Several programmes of monitoring and retrieval have taken place, carried out by SEPA radioactive substances specialists as well as specialist contractors employed by both SEPA and the MOD. This includes historic work around houses and gardens in the area. The most recent focus has been on the coastline.

The remediation work, which began in 2021, has been carried out by MOD contractors to deliver a successful remediation of Dalgety Bay.The work replaced rock armour around the headland and installed a replacement slipway for the Dalgety Bay Sailing Club to ensure that higher activity sources are no longer being eroded out and washed onto the beach, preventing public access to the remaining contamination.

During the two-year project, areas of the foreshore were excavated and processed to remove asbestos and radiological contamination. Around 6,500 particles, mostly low activity, have been removed. Work was paused between October and April each year to protect over wintering birds.

The MOD will now complete a two-year programme of monitoring to demonstrate the effectiveness of the remediation. Following the two-year programme, SEPA will take over monitoring of the area to give the necessary public reassurances in perpetuity. Fife Council has committed to the ongoing maintenance of the rock armour around the headland to ensure lasting effectiveness. SEPA and Fife Council signage will remain until remediation has been verified and any sources in the marine environment have been removed. Once SEPA has verified remediation has been successful, it is expected that some low hazard sources will occasionally be present on the beach, but these will not be of a nature to require any precautions to be undertaken by the public visiting the beach.

== See also ==
- List of former Royal Air Force stations
- List of air stations of the Royal Navy
