= Nocton Hub =

Village hall in Nocton, Lincolnshire, England

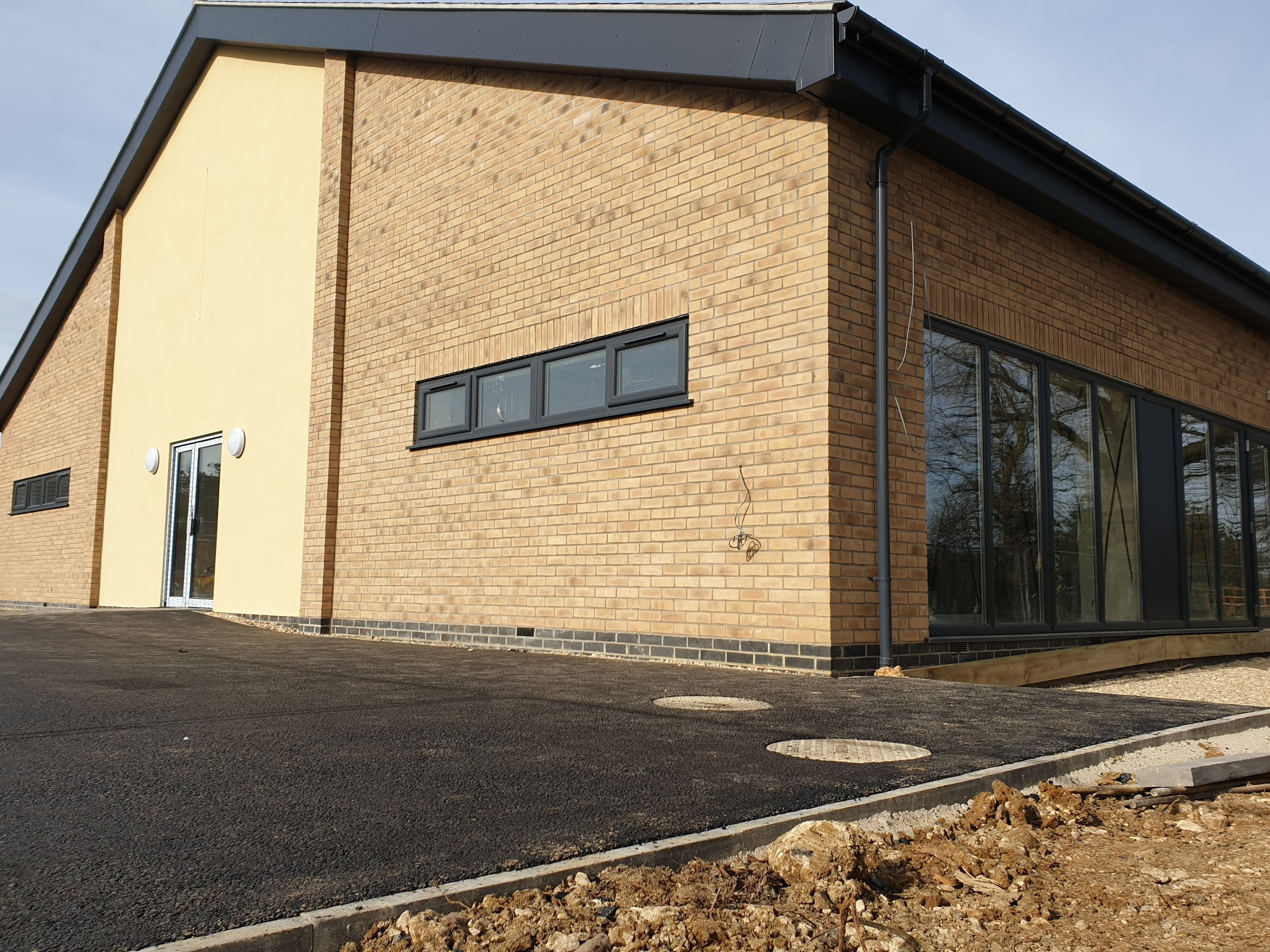
- Exterior view of Nocton Hub from Main Street

- Location within Lincolnshire
- Former names: Nocton Village Hall (1946-2019)
- Address: Main Street, Nocton, LN4 2BH
- Location: Nocton, Lincolnshire, UK
- Coordinates: 53.1655°N 0.4195°W
- Elevation: 15 m (49 ft)
- Owner: Nocton Parish Council
- Operator: Nocton Hub Trust
- Capacity: 120
- Executive suites: 3
- Type: Village Hall
- Event: Community Building
- Surface: Vinyl-covered concrete
- Scoreboard: No
- Public transit: Nocton, Village Hall

Construction
- Groundbreaking: 2019
- Built: 2020
- Cost: £660,000

Tenant
- Ripon Arms, Nocton

Website
- sites.google.com/view/nocton-hub/

Nocton Hub is a community-owned and operated building in Nocton, Lincolnshire, England, constructed to replace the previous village hall that stood on the same site. It was built between 2019 and 2020.

== History ==
=== 1946 Village Hall ===
A village hall has existed in Nocton since September 1946 when Smith's Potato Estates, owners of most of the cottages in the village, moved an old corrugated iron community building from Sleaford Market Place and incorporated a licensed social club (Nocton Social Club). Following the demise of Smith's Crisps in the 1970s, ownership of the village hall was transferred to Nocton Parish Council, however, the Nocton Social Club continued to operate the bar as a separate lodger entity. The building burned down in January 1979 but the insurance settlement was insufficient to completely meet the costs of a new brick-built building.

=== 1981 Village Hall ===
Faced with a funding gap from the 1979 insurance payout the local community engaged in fund-raising to make up the shortfall so that the replacement brick-built hall could be constructed. The restoration fund raised £10 000. The new hall was built on a new site which had been transferred to the Parish Council by British Field Products Limited, the then owners of the Nocton Farms Estate. It was officially opened on 1 November 1980. The building included a two-roomed social club bar and a separate event hall and was managed by a Village Hall Management Committee appointed by the Parish Council, however, the bar was staffed and operated by the Nocton Social Club, which operated as a not-for-profit community club. However, by May 1992 a Lincolnshire Echo news article reported that no further bookings would be taken due to a lack of support for events. By 1994 the Village Hall was running at a loss.

The Village Hall continued to operate, with a number of clubs and societies such as an indoor bowls club and the Women's Institute, as well as the social club bar which rebranded as Nocton Club in this period.

In 2011 it was noted that cracks were appearing in the walls of the hall and that there were problems with leaking drains. Although initially attributed to subsidence a 2014 structural survey found the floor slab to be unstable and sinking. This major defect was not covered by the buildings insurance policy. A working group was charged in 2015 with remodelling a revised building appropriate to the needs of a community now twice the size it was in 1981; after exploring repair and redesign it was found to be more cost-effective to demolish and rebuild a modern, efficient building. The building was demolished in Jun 2019.

=== 2020 Nocton Hub ===
The new Hub building was constructed between August 2019 and March 2020. Its internal area is 417 sq m in contrast to the 299 sq m of the previous building. The modern design addresses accessibility and equality issues and presents a street frontage dominated by full-height windows. Its construction was part-financed by the FCC Communities Foundation that provided approximately 10% of the project funding (£61 463).

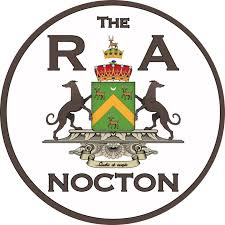
Pub sign of the Ripon Arms Nocton, a Community Interest Company

As with all previous Nocton Village Hall buildings since 1946, the Nocton Hub still incorporates the social club, which operates the bar & cellar independently but in support of the Nocton Hub. In 2023, the Nocton Club officially became a Community Interest Company (CIC) trading as The Ripon Arms C.I.C..
