= Nocton Priory =

Coordinates: 53.17061°N 0.39022°W

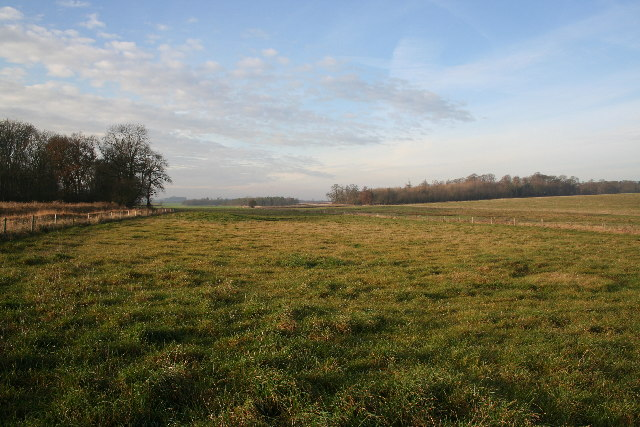
Site of Nocton Park Priory

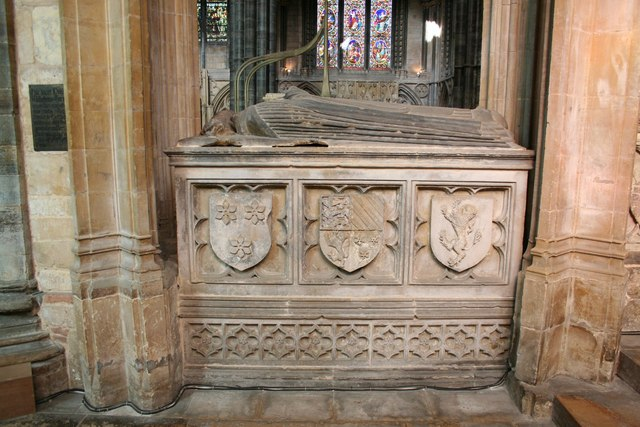
Chest tomb with recumbent effigy in Lincoln Cathedral (wrongly supposed to be of "Prior Wymbish" of Nocton Priory), is that of Canon Nicholas Wymbish of Nocton, died 1461. He was a Clerk of Chancery, and was given the cathedral prebend of Welton Rival by the king in 1426. Nicholas, who became extremely wealthy, inherited the manor of Nocton from his older brother Hugh, and on his death it passed to his nephew Thomas. The wills of Nicholas and Robert Wymbush (both canons) show that they belonged to the prominent gentry Wymbush/Wymbish family of Nocton Lincolnshire The manors of Osbournby and Water Willoughby were granted to the Priory in 1479 by Thomas Wymbish and John Ayleston

Nocton Park Priory was an Augustinian priory in Nocton, Lincolnshire, England.

The priory of Nocton Park was founded by Robert Darcy in honour of Saint Mary Magdalene, probably during the reign of King Stephen, in or near a pre-existing deer park known as Nocton Park. It later descended by marriage to the Wymbish family.

Little is known of the history of the house, as only one visitation report is preserved. In 1440 there were four canons beside the prior, as well as a canon of Thornton.

It was Dissolved in 1536. In 1569/70, Sir Henry Stanley, Lord Strange, (later Earl of Derby), constructed a house from the monastic ruins. At the end of the 17th century the house was abandoned and the buildings were dismantled. The site is scheduled and there are earthworks visible on Abbey Hill. In the middle of the eastern side of the site are the earth-covered foundations of a long rectangular building aligned east–west; this has been interpreted as the monastic church. Near to the west end of the church is a raised area where further earthworks define a large rectangular building thought to represent the remains of the post-Dissolution house.
