= Cornwallis (ship) =

Several vessels have borne the name Cornwallis, for Charles Cornwallis, 1st Marquess Cornwallis:

Two have an association with British East India Company.

- Cornwallis (1787 ship), a snow of 170 tons (bm), was launched at Bombay Dockyard in 1787 to serve the Bengal Pilot Service. A French privateer captured her in 1796.
- Cornwallis (1789 ship)'s origins are subject to a great deal of ambiguity. She was probably built at Surat. The 1789 year is an average across eight sources that range between 1788 and 1790. Reports of her size range between 653 and 719 tons (bm). What establishes the link between the reports are commonalities of masters and owners. She was a country ship, trading primarily around India and between India and China. She made two voyages to England for the East India Company. The vessel was used to exile the last king of Ceylon, King Sri Vikrama Rajasinghe to Vellore after his forced abdication by the British authorities headed by the governor Robert Brownrigg. She burned at Bombay in June 1841.

Other vessels:

- Cornwallis (1803 ship) was a French vessel launched in 1802 that came into British hands in 1803. Under a sequence of owners she traded with the West Indies, Spain, the Cape of Good Hope, and Singapore. She is last listed in 1834.
- Cornwallis (1812 ship) was launched in 1812 at Calcutta and foundered c. January 1822.
- Cornwallis (1862 ship) was launched by Thomas Vernon & Sons, Liverpool, on 11 June 1862 as a steel-hulled clipper ship. She was lost at Pitcairn Island in January 1875.

== See also ==
- HMS Cornwallis
- Earl Cornwallis (1783 ship)
- Marquis Cornwallis (ship)
