= Cornwall (disambiguation) =

Cornwall (Cornish: Kernow) is a ceremonial county in South West England.

Cornwall or The Cornwall may also refer to:

== Places ==
=== Australia ===
- Cornwall, Queensland
- Cornwall, Tasmania

=== Canada ===
- Cornwall, Ontario
- Cornwall, Prince Edward Island

==== Electoral districts ====
- Cornwall (federal electoral district), Ontario
- Cornwall (Province of Canada electoral district)
- Cornwall (provincial electoral district), Ontario

=== Jamaica ===
- Cornwall County, Jamaica, one of the three Jamaican counties

=== United Kingdom ===
- Duchy of Cornwall, an English duchy
- Cornwall (UK Parliament constituency), a former constituency

=== United States ===
- Cornwall, California
- Cornwall, Connecticut
  - Cornwall (CDP), Connecticut, the central village in the town of Cornwall
- Cornwall, Missouri
- Cornwall, New York
- Cornwall, Pennsylvania
- Cornwall, Vermont
- The Cornwall, a landmark in Denver, Colorado
- The Cornwall, New York City, New York

== Technology ==
- Cornwall, a loudspeaker made by Klipsch Audio Technologies
- LNWR 2-2-2 3020 Cornwall, a preserved steam locomotive also called Cornwall

== Other uses ==
- Cornwall, a dragon in the film Quest for Camelot
- Cornwall (surname), including a list of people with the name

== See also ==
- Cornewall
- Cornouaille (disambiguation)
- Cornwall County (disambiguation)
- Cornwall Island (disambiguation)
- Cornwall Land District, Tasmania, Australia
- Cornwall-on-Hudson, New York, United States
- Cornwall Township (disambiguation)
- Cornwallis (disambiguation)
- Cornwell (disambiguation)
- Duke of Cornwall (disambiguation)
- Earl of Cornwall, a former English hereditary title
- HMS Cornwall, various ships
- HMJS Cornwall, various ships
- Kerne (disambiguation)
- Kernow (disambiguation)
- North Cornwall Township, Pennsylvania, United States
- West Cornwall (disambiguation)
- West Cornwall Township, Pennsylvania, United States
