= Cornwall (surname) =

- Pronunciation: /ˈkɔːrnwɔːl/
- Language: English

Origin
- Language: Old English
- Origin: Cornwēalas
- Meaning: 'from Cornwall'

Other names
- Alternative spelling: Cornewall

Cornwall is an English surname and may refer to:

- Alan Cornwall (disambiguation)
- Barry Cornwall (1787–1874), pseudonym of Bryan Procter, English poet
- Beda Cornwall (1907–1994), American librarian
- Charles Wolfran Cornwall (1735–1789), British politician
- Claudia Maria Cornwall (born 1948), Canadian writer
- Jeff Cornwall (born 1991), Canadian lacrosse player
- John Cornwall (disambiguation)
- John of Cornwall (disambiguation)
- Luke Cornwall (born 1980), English footballer
- Nigel Cornwall (1903–1984), English bishop
- Rahkeem Cornwall (born 1993), Antiguan cricketer
- Richard Cornwall (disambiguation)
- Sonia Cornwall (1919–2006), Canadian artist
- Thomas Cornwall (1468–1537), English politician
- Travis Cornwall (born 1990), Canadian lacrosse player

== See also ==
- List of dukes of Cornwall
  - Prince Charles, Duke of Cornwall (born 1948), held title from 1952 to 2022; later Charles III (r. 2022–present)
  - Prince William, Duke of Cornwall (born 1982), held title since 2022
