= Curnow =

Curnow is a surname of Cornish origin and may refer to:

== People ==
- Allen Curnow (1911–2001), New Zealand poet and journalist
- Andrew Curnow (born 1950), Australian Anglican bishop
- Ann Curnow (1935–2011), English judge
- Betty Curnow (1911–2005), New Zealand artist
- Bob Curnow (born 1941), American musician
- Charlie Curnow (born 1997), Australian rules footballer; brother of Ed
- Ed Curnow (born 1989), Australian rules footballer; brother of Charlie
- Esmond Curnow (born 1946), Australian politician
- Eugene Curnow (1925–2010), American veterinarian
- Neil Curnow (born 1982), English cricketer
- Robyn Curnow (born 1972), South African journalist
- Rupert Curnow (1898–1950), Australian politician
- Syd Curnow (1907–1986), South African cricketer
- Sharlee Curnow (born 1997), Australian pop singer, songwriter, and social media personality known as Peach PRC
- Thomas Curnow (1855–1922), Australian schoolteacher
- William Curnow (1832–1903), Australian journalist
- William Leslie Curnow (1867–1926), Australian-born English journalist and spiritualist
- Wystan Curnow (born 1939), New Zealand writer

== Places ==
- "Curnow", an anglicised spelling of Kernow, the Cornish word for Cornwall
- Curnow Range, mountain range in Nevada

== See also ==
- Kernow (disambiguation)
- Kernel (disambiguation)
- Colonel (disambiguation)
