= Cornwallis (disambiguation) =

Charles Cornwallis, 1st Marquess Cornwallis (1738–1805) was a British Army officer and colonial administrator.

Cornwallis may also refer to:

== Places ==
=== Antarctica ===
- Cornwallis Island (South Shetland Islands)

=== Australia ===
- Cornwallis, New South Wales
- Cornwallis, Tasmania
- Dauan Island or Cornwallis Island, one of the Torres Strait Islands

=== Canada ===
- Cornwallis, Manitoba (rural municipality)
- Cornwallis Island (Nunavut)
- Cornwallis River, Kings County, Nova Scotia
- Cornwallis Township, Kings County, Nova Scotia
- Cornwallis Park, Nova Scotia
- Cornwallis Square, Nova Scotia
- Cornwallis Junior High School in Halifax
- CFB Cornwallis, a former Canadian Forces Base
- Little Cornwallis Island, Nunavut

=== New Zealand ===
- Cornwallis, New Zealand, Auckland Region
  - Cornwallis Beach

=== United Kingdom ===
- Cornwallis Academy, Kent, England

=== United States ===
- Cornwallis, West Virginia

== Other uses ==
- Cornwallis Valley Railway, a branchline of the Dominion Atlantic Railway
- SS Cornwallis, a Canadian freighter attacked by German submarine U-514
- HMS Cornwallis, several ships of the Royal Navy
- Cornwallis, one of several 18th-19th century vessels
- Fort Cornwallis, a star fort built by the British East India Company in Penang, present-day Malaysia

== People with the surname ==
- Kinahan Cornwallis (1883–1959), British diplomat
- Thomas Cornwallis (1605–1675), one of the first commissioners of the Province of Maryland (brother of Sir William)
- Thomas Cornwallis (died 1604), MP for Grampound
- Sir William Cornwallis (died 1614) (c. 1579 – 1614), British essayist
- George Cornwallis-West (1874–1951), stepfather of Winston Churchill

=== Aristocratic title ===
- Baron Cornwallis
- Earl Cornwallis
- Marquess Cornwallis

=== Aristocratic English family ===
- Charles Cornwallis, 3rd Baron Cornwallis (1655–1698), who served as First Lord of the Admiralty
- Edward Cornwallis (1713–1776), British colonialist and founder of Halifax, Canada
- Frederick Cornwallis (1713–1783), Archbishop of Canterbury
- Sir William Cornwallis (1744–1819), British admiral during the Napoleonic Wars

== People with the given name ==
- William Cornwallis Symonds (1810–1841), British officer in New Zealand

== See also ==
- Cornwall (disambiguation)
- Cornouailles (Cornish: Kernow), England, UK
- Cornouaille (Breton: Kernev), Brittany, France
- Cornouaille (disambiguation)
