= French ship Jean Bart =

Jean Bart may refer to one of the following ships of the French Navy or privateers named in honour of Jean Bart (21 October 1651 – 27 April 1702), a French naval commander and privateer.

== Naval vessels ==
- Jean Bart: a 74-gun ship of the line (1791–1809)
- Jean Bart: a 20-gun corvette, lead ship of her class, she sailed the Channel, the North Sea and the Atlantic as far as New York before Cerberus and Santa Margarita captured her in the Channel in 1795; taken into the Royal Navy as Arab, but wrecked 1796 on the Penmarks.
- Gunboat Jean Bart, which Admiral Hood took into British service in September–October 1793 at Toulon, and put under the command of Lieutenant Cox. The British may have burnt her when they withdrew from the city.
- Jean Bart: a British lugger of eight guns and 50 tons (bm) that the French captured in August 1793; briefly renamed Joyeaux (1795–96), she was decommissioned in 1800 at Cherbourg.
- Jean Bart: Launched at Bayonne in 1786 as a privateer, she was a 24-gun corvette of the French Navy from 1794 that the Royal Navy captured in 1795 and sold in 1797 at Jamaica.
- Jean Bart: possibly requisitioned in 1803, she was armed in November and was decommissioned on 31 March 1807.
- troop ship n°799 (1803–1806)
- troop ship n°816 (1803–1806)
- Jean Bart, a 74-gun ship of the line (1820–1833)
- Jean Bart, an 80-gun ship of the line
- The ship of the line Donawerth was renamed Jean Bart in September 1868
- Jean Bart, a first class cruiser of 4,800 tonnes
- Jean Bart, a 23,600 tonne battleship; the first French dreadnought
- Jean Bart, the last French battleship completed, 40,000 tonnes and armed with 380mm/45 Modèle 1935 guns
- Jean Bart (1988), an anti-aircraft frigate, in service with the French Navy from 1991 to 2021
Ships of the French Navy named Jean Bart
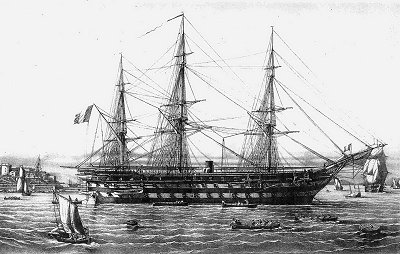
Jean Bart (1852)

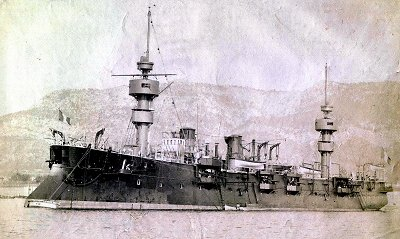
Jean Bart (1889) off Toulon

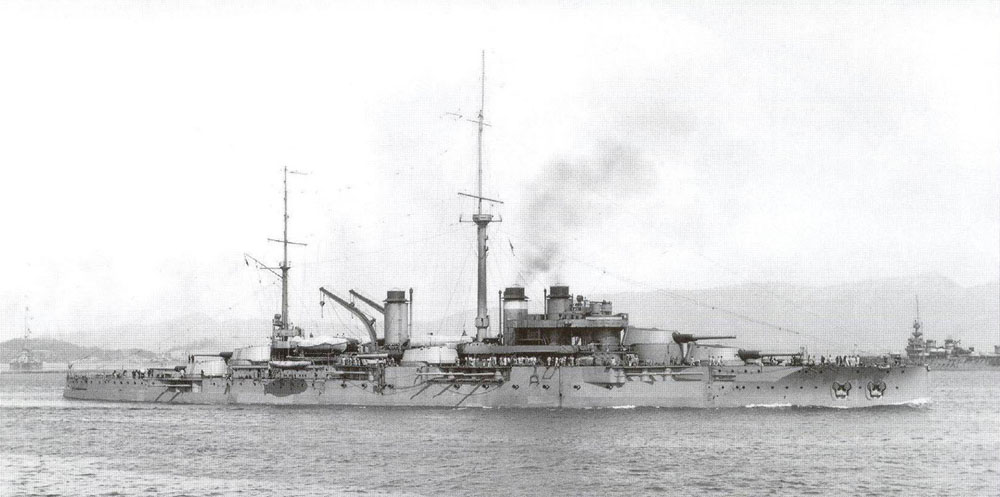
Jean Bart (1911) in 1914

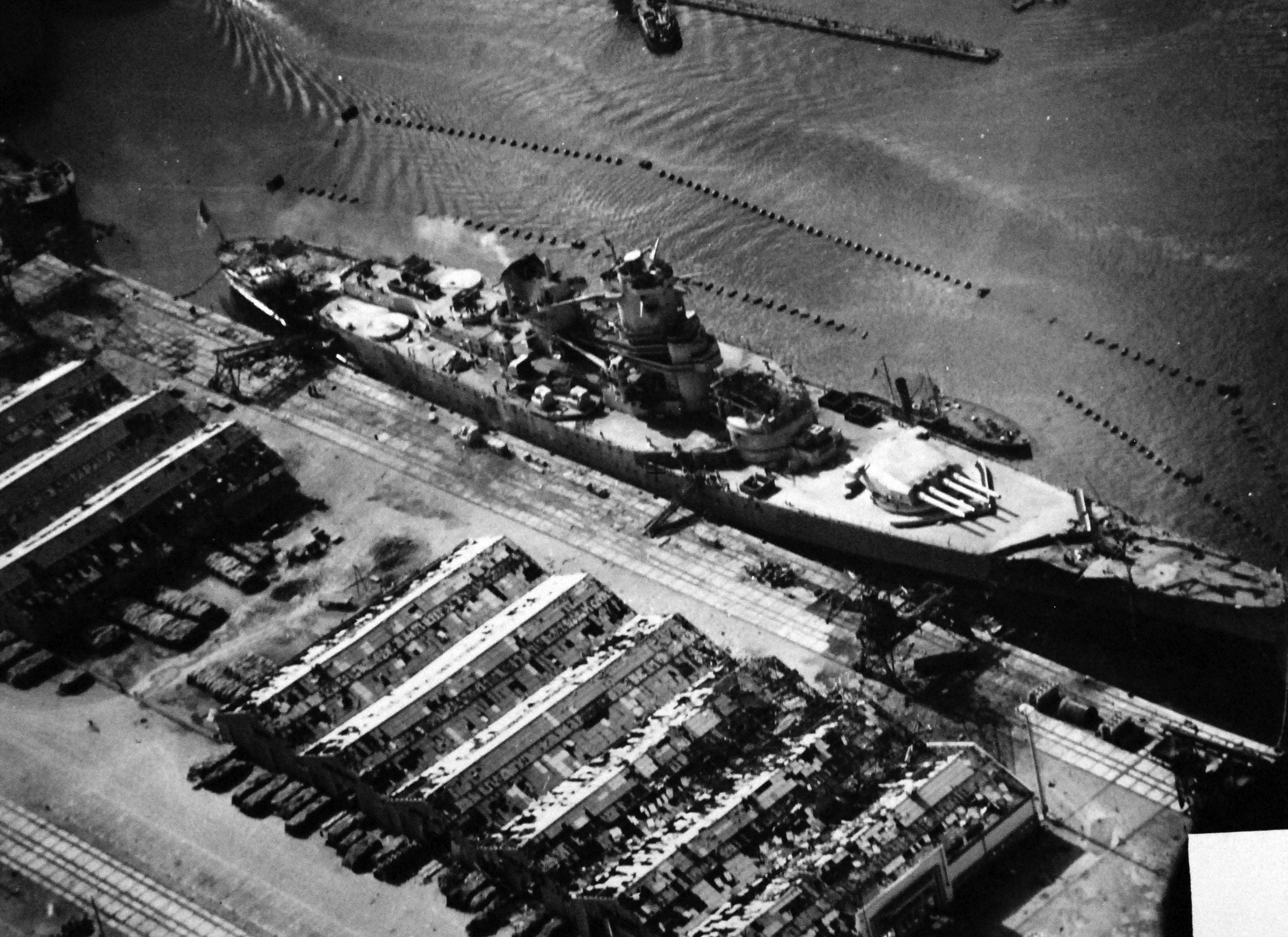
Jean Bart (1940)

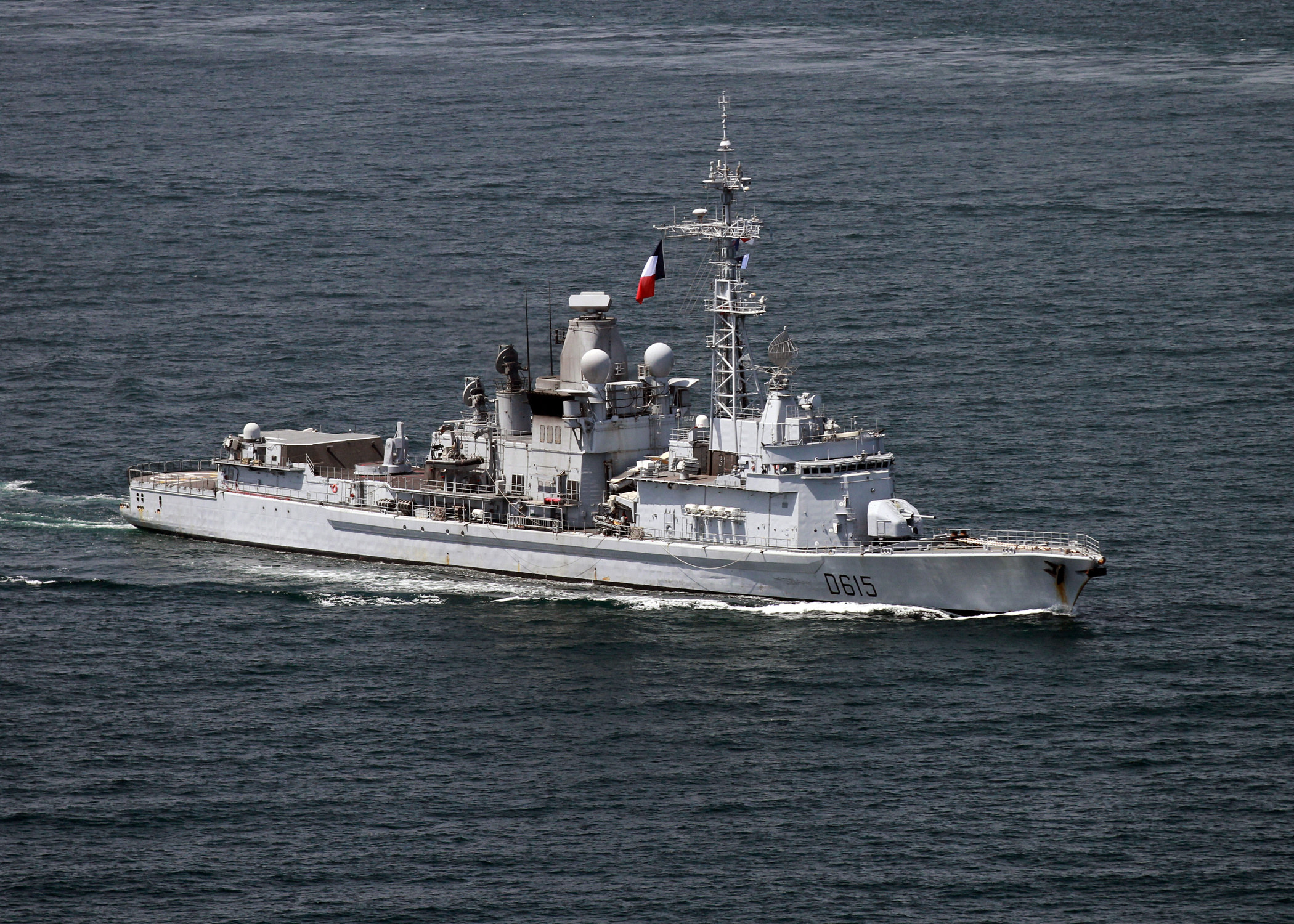
Jean Bart (1988) in 2014

== Privateers ==
- French 20-gun privateer Jean Bart, constructed at Le Havre in 1778 and launched in January 1779. That year she cruised under the command of François Cottin. In April 1779 he and the owners of Jean Bart submitted a claim for salvage for the Swedish vessel Mercure, which an English privateer had captured on her way from Saint Petersburg to Brest, and which Jean Bart had recaptured 48 hours later. Cottin and Jean Bart captured numerous prizes, including an English vessel of 200 tons (burthen) and 10 guns, after an engagement of an hour and a half. HMS Delight captured her on 1 April off Dunmore after a fight of about three hours that left Delight with one man killed and two wounded. At the time of her capture Jean Bart had about 190 men on board. HMS Jupiter came up after and took Jean Bart into Plymouth.
- French privateer Jean Bart: HMS Ferret captured the privateers Jean Bart and Jeune-Marie of Dunkirk on 21 February 1793. Jean Bart was armed with six 3-pounder and four swivel guns, and had a crew of 39 men. Ferret brought both privateers into Ramsgate.
- French privateer Jean Bart captured on 9 March 1793 by the fireship Falcon.
- Jean Bart was a corvette of 500 tons (French; "of load", 20 guns, and about 180 men. She was commissioned in August 1794 and renamed Entreprise circa 1795. As Jean Bart, this vessel, described as having 22 guns, may have been the vessel that participated in an inconclusive multi-ship action on 22 October 1794 with Diomede and Centurion, off Île de France. Enterprise, under Captain François Legars, captured a number of British vessels in 1795–96, including the British East India Company's pilot boat Cornwallis.
- French privateer lugger Jean Bart, captured on 29 September 1797 by His Majesty's hired armed cutter Telemachus. Jean Bart was built at Dunkirk in 1780. Before Telemachus captured her, she captured Fly, which was sold for 185,806 livres.
- French privateer sloop Jean Bart, captured on 16 May 1798 by HMS Rover.
- French privateer Jean Bart of 100 tons, three guns (one a 16-pounder) and four swivel guns, and a crew of 121 men. She made her first, and most profitable cruise, in May 1809. This cruise lasted for six months. Subsequent cruises were shorter, and none was as profitable. In all, she made four cruises during which she took a number of ships and earned for her shareholders a net profit of 366,408 francs. There is no record of what happened to her after the summer of 1811.
- French privateer lugger Jean Bart. On the morning of 1 September 1809, HMS Nassau was escorting a convoy of East Indiamen in the English Channel when she sighted a strange sail. Nassau sent her boats in chase and after two hours they were able to capture Jean Bart of Saint Malo. She was armed with four guns and had a crew of 25 men under the command of Louis Ollivier Pilvesse, Enseign de Vaisseau. She was five days out of the Île de Batz and had made no captures.
- The French privateer Jean Bart captured Valetti, Edward Motley, master, as Valetti was sailing from Malta to Bristol. In the four-hour action Motley and four of his men were wounded; Jean Bart had two men killed and seven wounded.
- French privateer schooner Jean Bart, captured on 23 February 1812 by HMS Blossom.
- French privateer Grand Jean Bart, of Saint Malo, captured on 29 February 1812 by HMS Semiramis. After a chase of six hours, Semiramis caught up with the privateer, which was under the command of M. Benjamin Dupont. She was of 220 tons burthen, was armed with 14 guns and had a crew of 106 men. She was on her second cruise and had out-sailed several British frigates before; this had induced an over-confidence in M. Dupont, who had permitted Semiramis to approach too near before trying to escape.

== Other vessels ==
- Ketch Jean Bart captured on 1 March 1800 by the hired armed cutter Suwarrow.
- French whaling vessel Jean Bart which visited the Auckland Islands, departing out of Dunkirk in 1838 and anchoring at the Chatham Islands in February 1839. On February 16, the day of arrival, Captain Gautraux committed suicide; subsequently his ship was burnt and the entire crew either drowned or was massacred by the local Māori people. Later that same year three other ships, the American whaler Rebecca Sims along with the French whaler Adèle and French naval corvette Héroïne, returned to exact revenge.
- Jean Bart (2002) is the name given to the replica of a 1670, 84-gun ship-of-the-line, that is being constructed by the Association Tourville at Gravelines, Dunkirk, to the plans of the seventeenth century ship builder Colbert. It has European funding through the Heroes2c programme.
