= Governor Cornwallis =

Governor Cornwallis may refer to:

- Charles Cornwallis, 1st Marquess Cornwallis (1738–1805), Governor-General of the Presidency of Fort William in 1805
- Edward Cornwallis (1713–1776), Governor of Nova Scotia from 1749 to 1752 and Governor of Gibraltar from 1761 to 1776
  - Governor Cornwallis (ferry), a ferry that operated on the Halifax–Dartmouth Ferry Service

== See also ==
- Thomas Cornwallis (1605–1675), Commissioner of the Province of Maryland
