= General Cornwallis (disambiguation) =

Charles Cornwallis, 1st Marquess Cornwallis (1738–1805) was a British Army general. General Cornwallis may also refer to:

- Edward Cornwallis (1713–1776), British Army lieutenant general
- Stephen Cornwallis (1703–1743), British Army major general
