= Roger Townshend (British Army officer, born 1708) =

British soldier and Member of Parliament

Roger Townshend (5 June 1708 – 7 August 1760) was a British soldier and Member of Parliament.

Townshend was the youngest son of Charles Townshend, 2nd Viscount Townshend, from his first marriage to the Hon. Elizabeth Pelham. Charles Townshend, 3rd Viscount Townshend, Thomas Townshend and William Townshend were his elder brothers while George Townshend, 1st Marquess Townshend, Charles Townshend and Thomas Townshend, 1st Viscount Sydney, were his nephews. Townshend was a cavalry officer in Wade's Regiment of Horse and was notably present as an aide-de-camp to King George II at the Battle of Dettingen in 1743. He served as Governor of the North Yarmouth garrison from 1745 to 1760.

Apart from his military career he also sat as Member of Parliament for Great Yarmouth from 1738 to 1747 and for Eye from 1747 to 1748 and a Receiver of Customs from 1748 to 1760. During his time in Parliament he voted with the Opposition in his first Parliament but thereafter with the Administration.

Townshend died in August 1760, aged 52. He never married.

== See also ==
- Marquess Townshend

== Notes ==
Parliament of Great Britain
Preceded by William Townshend; Sir Edward Walpole	Member of Parliament for Great Yarmouth; 1738–1747; With: Sir Edward Walpole	Succeeded by Sir Edward Walpole; Charles Townshend
Preceded by John Cornwallis; Edward Cornwallis	Member of Parliament for Eye; 1747–1748; With: Edward Cornwallis	Succeeded by Edward Cornwallis; Nicholas Hardinge
