= Cornwall County =

Cornwall County may refer to:

- Cornwall County, Province of New York, United States
- Cornwall County, Jamaica
- the former name of Cornwall Land District, Tasmania, Australia
- Cornwall (Cornish: Kernow), England, UK; a county, and former countdom
- United Counties of Stormont, Dundas and Glengarry, Ontario, Canada; sometimes called "County of Cornwall"
- Cornouaille (Breton: Kernev), Brittany, France; a former sovereign county, also spelled as "Cornwall"

== See also ==
- Duchy of Cornwall
- Count of Cornouaille (disambiguation)
- Cornwall Township (disambiguation)
- Cornwall (disambiguation)
- Kernow (disambiguation)
