= Duke of Cornwall (disambiguation) =

Duke of Cornwall is an English hereditary title.

Duke of Cornwall may also refer to:

- List of dukes of Cornwall, including
  - Charles III (born 1948; r. 2022–present), King of the United Kingdom; Duke of Cornwall from 1952 to 2022
  - William, Prince of Wales (born 1982), Duke of Cornwall since 2022
- Duke of Cornwall, a character in the play King Lear
- SS Rushen Castle, named Duke of Cornwall from 1898 to 1928
- Duke of Cornwall Hotel, Plymouth, Devon, England, United Kingdom

== See also ==
- Cornwall (disambiguation)
- Duchess of Cornwall, the wife of the Duke of Cornwall titleholder, including
  - Queen Camilla (born 1947), titular holder from 2005 to 2022 by marriage to Charles
  - Catherine, Princess of Wales (born 1982), titular holder since 2022 by marriage to William
- Duchy of Cornwall, the estate associated with the Duke of Cornwall title
- Duke of Cornwall's Light Infantry, a British Army regiment
- Earl of Cornwall, superseded by the Duke of Cornwall title in 1337
- Rosa 'Duchess of Cornwall', an orange garden rose
