= James Cornwallis =

British Member of Parliament (1701–1727)

James Cornwallis (16 September 1701 – 1727) was a Royal Navy officer and politician who sat in the House of Commons from 1722 to 1727 as a supporter of the Whig government of Robert Walpole.

Cornwallis was the second son of Charles Cornwallis, 4th Baron Cornwallis, and his wife Lady Charlotte Butler, daughter of Richard Butler, 1st Earl of Arran. He joined the Royal Navy and was lieutenant in 1720 and commander of the Griffin fire-ship.

Cornwallis was returned unopposed by his elder brother, Lord Cornwallis, as Member of Parliament for the family borough of Eye at a by-election on 3 November 1722.

Cornwallis had not married by his death on 28 May 1727, just before the 1727 British general election. His had four brothers, Stephen Cornwallis, John Cornwallis, and twins Edward Cornwallis and Frederick Cornwallis. Stephen and Edward had military careers in the Army, and Frederick in the Anglican Church.

Parliament of Great Britain
| Preceded by Edward Hopkins; Hon. Spencer Compton | Member of Parliament for Eye; 1722–1727; With: Edward Hopkins | Succeeded by Hon. StephenCornwallis; Hon. John Cornwallis |
