= Count of Cornouaille =

Comte de Cornouaille (French), Kont Kernev (Breton), or Count of Cornouaille may refer to:

- Gourmaëlon, Count of Cornouaille (died 914)
- Benoît de Cornouaille (died 1028), see his son Alain Canhiart
- Alain Canhiart (died 1058)
- Hoël II, Duke of Brittany (1031–1084)

== See also ==
- Cornouaille, Brittany, France; a region, former kingdom, and former sovereign county
- Cornwall County (disambiguation)
- Cornouaille (disambiguation)
