= Cornewall =

Cornewall is a surname. Notable people with the surname include:

- Cornewall baronets
- George Cornewall (1748–1819) – 2nd Baronet
  - George Cornewall (disambiguation), multiple people

== See also ==
- Cornwall (disambiguation)
