= List of islands of Cornwall =

There are several islands scattered around the coastline of Cornwall. The majority are small islets, except the Isles of Scilly which is an inhabited archipelago situated 20 miles south-west of Lands End.

== Islands ==
You can help by expanding this list

- St Michael's Mount
- Looe Island
- Godrevy Island
- Eddystone Rocks
- Towan Island, Newquay
- Asparagus Island
- Mullion Island
- St Clement's Isle, Mousehole

=== Devon Islands often confused as Cornish ===
- Lundy
- Drake's Island
- The Mewstone Wembury

== Rocks and Outcrops ==
You can help by expanding this list

- Bawden Rocks
- The Brisons
- Cannis Rock Gribben Head
- Wolf Rock
- Longships
- Seven Stones
- Runnel Stone
- The Manacles
- Udder Rock Lantivet Bay
- The Carracks
- Welloe Rock Rinsey
- Gulland Rock
- The Mouls Pentire
- Newland Rock Pentire
- Killyvarder Rock Par
- The Gwineas Gorran Haven
- Gull Rock Nare Head
- The Ranneys Looe Island
