= John Cornwallis =

British Member of Parliament (1706–1768)

- Born: 23 December 1706
- Died: 9 June 1768 (aged 61)
- Occupation: Politician

John Cornwallis (23 December 1706 – 9 June 1768) was a British politician who sat in the House of Commons from 1727 to 1747.

== History ==
Cornwallis was the fourth son of Charles Cornwallis, 4th Baron Cornwallis, and his wife Lady Charlotte Butler, daughter of Richard Butler, 1st Earl of Arran. He was educated at Eton College in 1718. He married Sarah Dale, daughter of Rev. Hugh Dale. His brothers Edward, James and Stephen were also members of Parliament.

Cornwallis was returned unopposed as Member of Parliament for the family seat of Eye at the 1727 general election with his elder brother Stephen. He voted regularly with the Government and was appointed Equerry to Prince of Wales in about 1731. He spoke against the repeal of the Septennial Act in 1734. At the 1734 election he was returned unopposed with his brother again. In 1737, he gave up his post of equerry to the Prince when the Prince of Wales went into opposition, because the pension he had from the King was worth more than the salary from his place. He was returned unopposed with his brother again at the 1741 election. At the end of Walpole's Administration he voted with the Opposition on Pulteney's motion for a secret committee to inquire into the war, on account of which his brother, Lord Cornwallis, turned him out of doors next day. He subsequently became a follower of the Prince of Wales again. He was not renominated by Lord Cornwallis for Eye at the 1747 election but stood on his own account and was defeated. He did not stand for Parliament again.

== Death ==
Cornwallis died on 9 June 1768, leaving a son and three daughters.

Parliament of Great Britain
Preceded by Edward Hopkins; James Cornwallis	Member of Parliament for Eye; 1727–1747; With: Stephen Cornwallis 1727–1743; Edward Cornwallis 1743–1747	Succeeded by Edward Cornwallis; Roger Townshend
