= USS Sanborn =

1944 attack transport in United States Navy

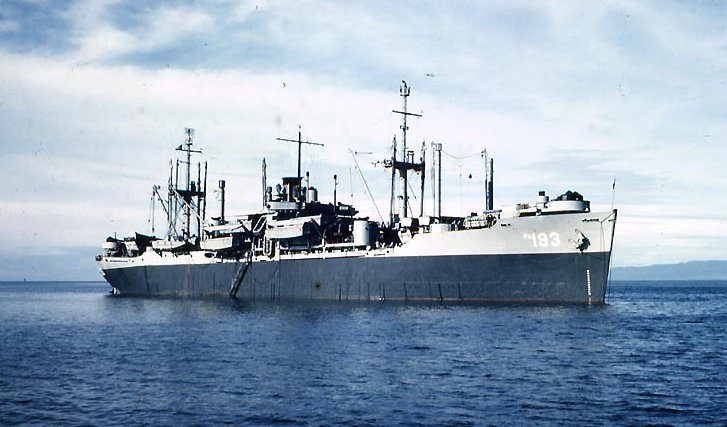
- USS Sanborn (APA-193) at anchor, place unknown, late 1944 or early '45

History

United States
- Name: USS Sanborn
- Namesake: Sanborn County, South Dakota
- Ordered: as type VC2-S-AP5; MCV hull 661
- Laid down: 10 March 1944
- Launched: 19 August 1944
- Acquired: 3 October 1944
- Commissioned: 3 October 1944
- Decommissioned: 14 August 1946
- In service: 6 January 1951
- Out of service: 11 May 1956
- Stricken: 1 July 1960
- Home port: Norfolk, Virginia
- Fate: Scrapped, 1971

General characteristics
- Displacement: 14,833 (full load)
- Length: 455 ft 0 in (138.68 m)
- Beam: 62 ft 0 in (18.90 m)
- Draught: 28 ft 1 in (8.56 m)
- Speed: 17 knots
- Capacity: 150,000 cu. ft, 2,900 tons
- Complement: 56 Officers 480 Enlisted
- Armament: one 5"/38 caliber gun mount, twelve 40 mm gun mounts, ten 20 mm gun mounts

USS Sanborn (APA-193) was a Haskell-class attack transport acquired by the United States Navy during World War II for the task of transporting troops to and from combat areas.

== World War II service ==
Sanborn (APA-193) was laid down on 10 March 1944 under United States Maritime Commission contract (MCV hull 661); launched on 19 August 1944 by the Kaiser Shipbuilding Corp., Vancouver, Washington; sponsored by Mrs. Eric Johnson; acquired by the Navy and commissioned on 3 October 1944.

After embarking her landing craft at San Francisco, California, conducting shakedown training at San Pedro, Los Angeles, and amphibious training at San Diego, California, Sanborn left for Pacific Ocean duty, arriving at Honolulu on 16 December 1944. Exchanging her construction battalion passengers for Army troops and Marines, she joined the Amphibious Force, Pacific Fleet, under Vice Adm. Richmond K. Turner.

=== Landing on Iwo Jima ===
Sailing via Eniwetok, Marshall Islands, Sanborn arrived at Saipan on 11 February 1945 to participate in preinvasion rehearsals for the forthcoming assault on Iwo Jima. On 18 February, the landing boats of Sanborn lowered their ramps on Blue Beach, Iwo Jima. Ten boats were lost, one by enemy fire and nine broached in the treacherous surf. Her beach party also suffered from enemy action; all of the party's officers were lost. Boatswain's Mate 1st Class William D. Maroney took charge and was later awarded the Silver Star for his "extraordinary leadership and gallantry" in carrying out his duties under Japanese fire from 19 to 27 February 1945.

=== Okinawa operations ===
Carrying 232 casualties, Sanborn sailed for the Marianas on 28 February. There, she transferred the wounded to shore-based hospitals, then prepared for Operation Iceberg, the invasion of the Ryukyus. In late March, Sanborn sailed west for Okinawa with the largest amphibious task force of the Pacific campaign. After participating in a feint attack, Sanborn served as part of the floating reserve until 11 April, when she returned to Saipan.

=== End-of-war operations ===
She then sailed to Tulagi, Solomon Islands, and Nouméa, New Caledonia, to embark new landing craft, and returned to Saipan. She next headed for San Francisco to embark troops of the U.S. 86th Infantry Division, transporting them to Batangas, Luzon, via Eniwetok and Ulithi. With hostilities ended, Sanborn's mission was now transportation of occupation troops to Japan, and participation in Operation Magic Carpet bringing troops home from the Pacific and Alaska. Sanborn was then decommissioned and, on 14 August 1946, placed in the Pacific Reserve Fleet, berthed at Stockton, California.

== Korean War service ==
Recommissioned at San Diego on 6 January 1951, Sanborn conducted shakedown training off southern California before transiting the Panama Canal and joining the Amphibious Force, Atlantic Fleet, at Norfolk, Virginia. She conducted numerous landing exercises at Vieques, Puerto Rico, and Onslow Beach, North Carolina, for the next three years. In May 1953, Sanborn joined the Service Force, Atlantic Fleet, and transported construction battalions between Davisville, Rhode Island, Guantánamo Bay, Cuba, and Casablanca, French Morocco. After July 1954, she once more participated in landing exercises along the East Coast of the United States and in the Caribbean.

== Sixth Fleet service in the Mediterranean ==
On 7 January 1955, Sanborn departed Norfolk bound for the Mediterranean to serve with the amphibious force of the United States Sixth Fleet. During the next five months, she showed the flag in ports in Italy, Greece, Turkey, Crete, Sardinia, France, and Spain. Between these visits, Sanborn participated in landing exercises to maintain both the ship's company and embarked United States Marines in combat readiness.

== Stars in Hollywood movie as "USS Belinda" ==
After her return to Norfolk, she continued to conduct amphibious training; this routine was interrupted, however, when Sanborn starred as "USS Belinda (APA-22)" in the movie Away All Boats produced by Universal International Pictures.

== Final decommissioning ==
Sanborn was decommissioned and placed in reserve for the last time and berthed at Orange, Texas. Her name was struck from the Navy list on 1 July 1960 and was scrapped in 1971.

== Military awards and honors ==
Sanborn earned two battle stars for her service at Iwo Jima and Okinawa.

== Notable USS Sanborn Crew Members ==
- Eugene Curnow
- Byron Alfred Dary
- Ernest Bocolo
- Billy C. Jones
- Lloyd Kiva New
