= Cornouaille (disambiguation) =

Cornouaille may refer to:

- Cornouaille (Breton: Kernev; Late English: Cornwall), Brittany, France
- Pointe de Cornouaille, Cornouaille, Brittany, France; a cape that gives Cornouaille its name
- Diocese of Cornouaille, a Roman Catholic diocese in France
- Kingdom of Cornouaille, a petty kingdom of Celts that was merged into the Kingdom of Brittany
- House of Cornouaille, a ruling house of the Kingdom of Brittany, see List of rulers of Brittany
- Count of Cornouaille (disambiguation)
- Quimper–Cornouaille Airport (IATA airport code: UIP; ICAO airport code: LFRQ) Finistère, Brittany, France
- Parc botanique de Cornouaille (Cornwall Botanic Park)
- Festival de Cornouaille (Cornwall Festival; Cornouaille Kemper)
- Quimper Cornouaille FC, soccer team based in Breton: Kemper, Kernev, Breizh
- Escadron de Chasse 3/12 Cornouaille, a French Air Force fighter squadron, see List of French Air and Space Force aircraft squadrons

== See also ==
- Quimper (Breton: Kemper), Cornouaille, Brittany, France; the traditional capital of Cornouaille
- Cornouailles (Cornish: Kernow), England, UK
- Cornwallis (disambiguation)
- Cornwall (disambiguation)
- Kernow (disambiguation)
- Kerne (disambiguation)
