= Kynance Cove =

Inlet on the coast of Cornwall, England

- Ben Kewnans
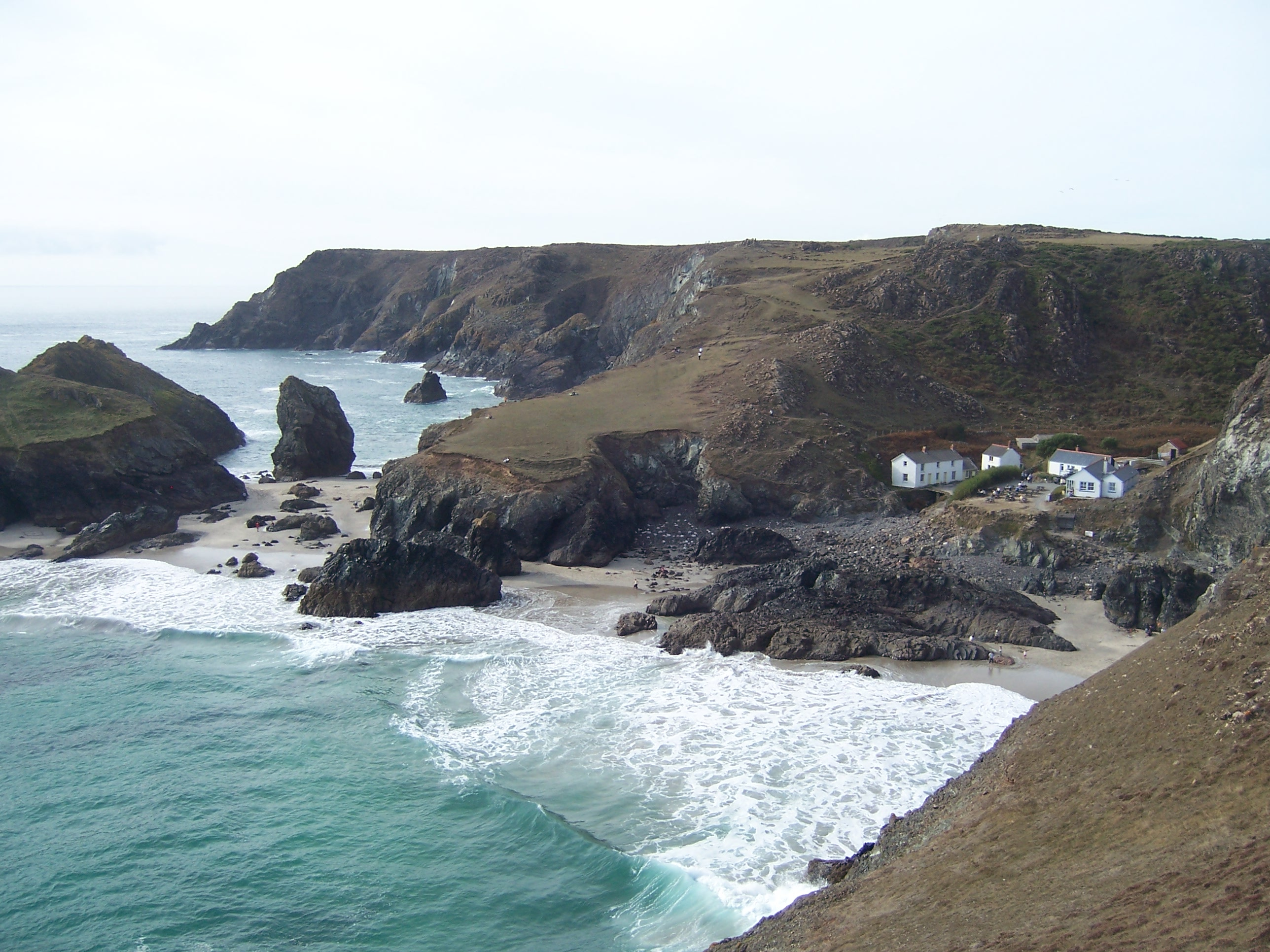
- Kynance Cove, Lizard Peninsula, Cornwall

- Location in Cornwall
- Location: Cornwall
- Coordinates: 49.974°N 5.230°W
- Type: Cove

Kynance Cove (Cornish: Ben Kewnans, meaning foot of steep-sided valley) is a cove on the eastern side of Mount's Bay, Cornwall, England. It is situated on the Lizard peninsula approximately two miles (3 km) north of Lizard Point. The cove became popular in the early Victorian era, with many distinguished visitors including Queen Victoria and Prince Albert and the poets Alfred Tennyson and Algernon Swinburne. The BBC has described Kynance Cove as "one of the most beautiful stretches of coastline in the South West". The South West Coast Path, which follows the coast of south west England from Somerset to Dorset passes by on the cliffs overlooking the cove.

Kynance Cove and the surrounding coast are owned and managed by the National Trust. It is part of the West Lizard Site of Special Scientific Interest and is in the Cornwall Area of Outstanding Natural Beauty. The Kynance Café, which opened for business in 1929, relied on spring water and on a generator for power. When the café became the property of the National Trust in 1999, the Trust renovated it and provided mains water and electricity. Access is via the coastal footpath from the nearby National Trust car park.

== Geography and geology ==
Much of the Lizard peninsula is known for its botany and geology, and about 375 million years ago the molten rock, which eventually became the Lizard, was about 10 km below the surface of the Earth and under immense heat and pressure. One of the rocks (peridotite) is rich in magnesium and iron, and changed through heat and pressure to serpentinite as it pushed upwards from the Moho, the boundary of the Earth's crust and mantle. It finally reached the crust's surface, about 30° south of the equator as part of an ocean ridge, in the Rheic Ocean. Over the next 80 million years the Rheic Ocean disappeared and the mass of rock headed north crossing the equator about 250 million years ago. The rock mass, which became the Lizard peninsula, passed the Tropic of Cancer less than 100 million years ago and finally reached 50° north at about the start of the last Ice Age.

There are two types of serpentine at Kynance: bastite and tremolite. The rocks at the car park, cliffs to the south and the path to the cove are bastite serpentine, which is the primary serpentine on the Lizard. The rock is coarse-grained with large shiny crystals of bastite which give a flecked appearance. The islands and stacks within the cove and the valley are of tremolite serpentine which is fine-grained and banded. Tremolite is different from bastite serpentine because it was subject to higher pressure within the crust. Kynance Cove is an important site for geologists because of the exposures of the two types of ophiolitic serpentinite, together with granite and gneiss pods within the serpentine. The area has been designated as a Geological Conservation Review site.

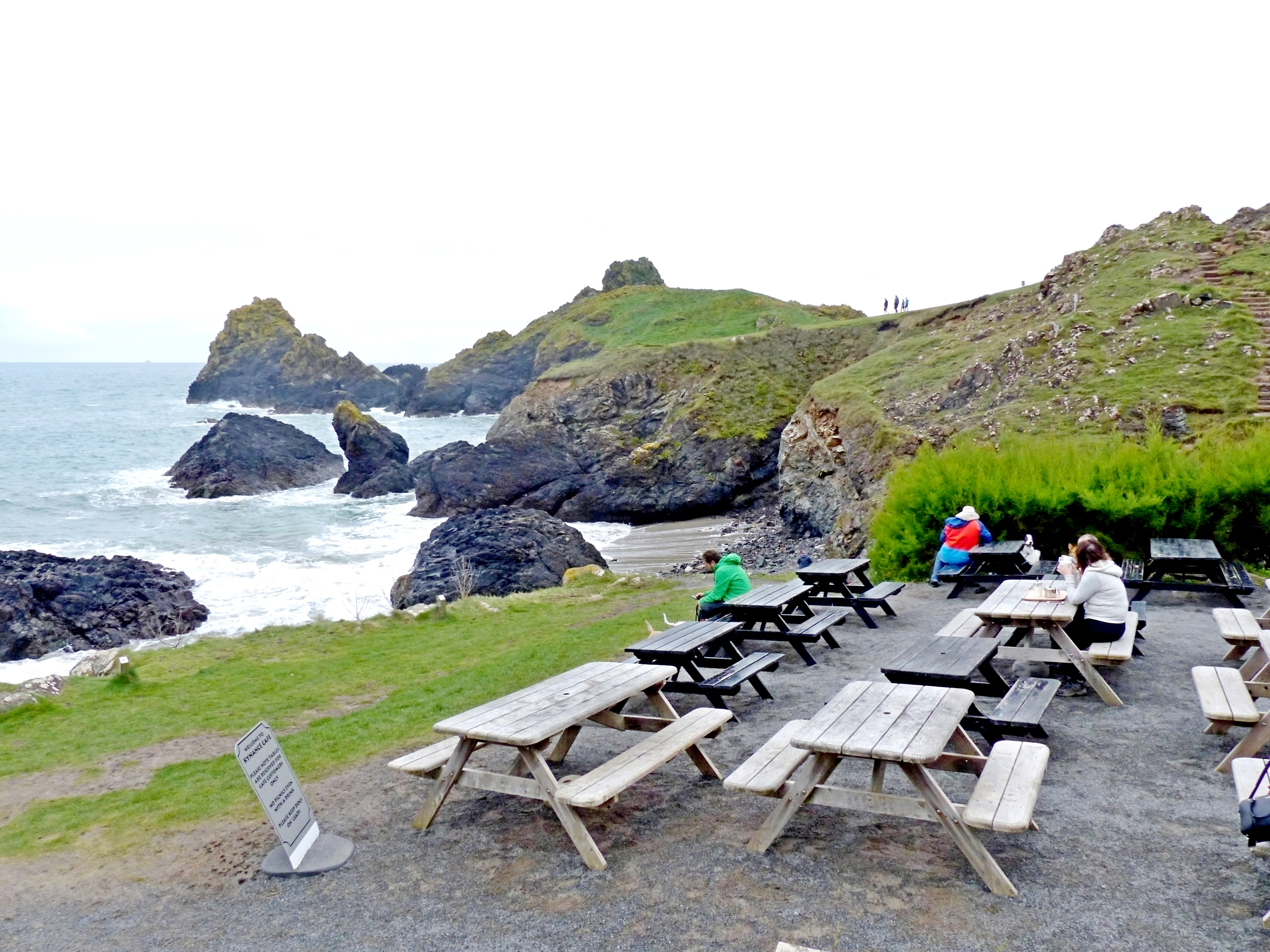
The National Trust cafe at Kynance Cove

There are a number of small tidal islands and stacks within Kynance Cove which were formed because the tremolite serpentine was broken into blocks and invaded by other types of rock, including granite and basalt. These softer rocks were eroded by the sea and the four largest stacks from left to right are The Bishop, Gull Rock, Asparagus Island and Steeple Rock. It was thought that Asparagus Island, which is cut off on almost every high tide, was connected to the mainland by a sand tombolo. The winter storms washed the sand away to reveal a rocky ridge, probably formed more than 100,000 years ago when sea levels were higher.

At about half-tide a snorting can be heard – the sound of the Devil's bellows a blowhole on Asparagus Island which was caused by the sea tunnelling along a fault. A second blowhole, the Post Office is so named because there is enough suction to post a letter in it.

== Wildlife ==
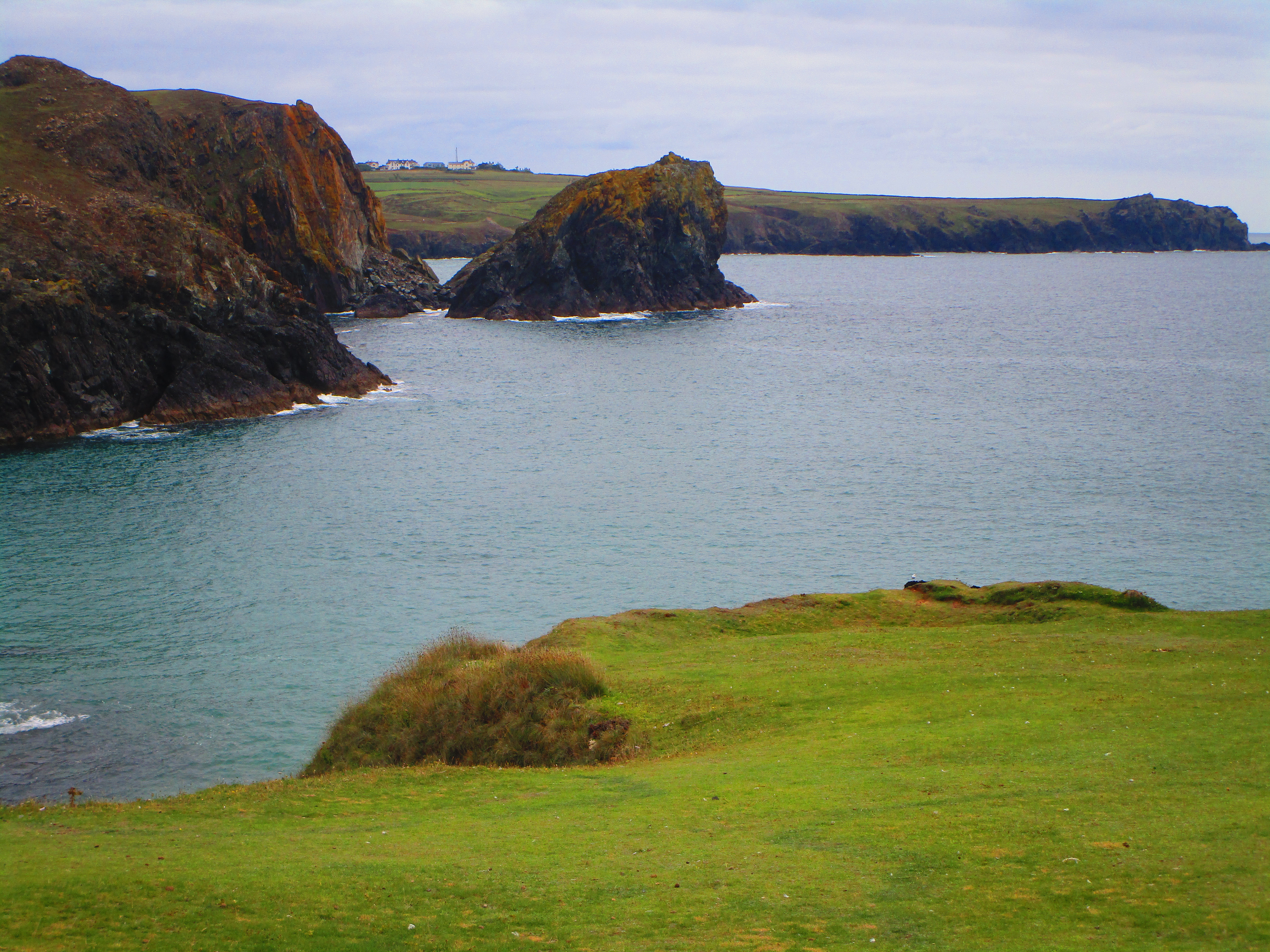
A view from one of Kynance Cove's many hills

Kynance Cove was the venue for the first British record of Porter's rustic (Athetis hospes), a rare migrant moth from southern Europe.

== Popular culture ==
Kynance Cove features in the 2015 production of Agatha Christie’s And Then There Were None, a period drama of three daily episodes first broadcast on 26 December 2015. It is also used as a location for the TV series Poldark, as Ross Poldark’s beloved Nampara, and in the episode The Devil's Foot from The Return of Sherlock Holmes. Kynance Cove was used in seasons 1 and 2 of the HBO series House of the Dragon as a Velaryon camp. Recently, filming for the Harry Potter TV series has taken place at the cove. In film it has been used for additional shots for the planet Ahch-To in Star Wars: The Last Jedi, and featured in The Thief of Bagdad.
