= Cornwall Township =

Cornwall Township may refer to the following townships

in the United States:

- Cornwall Township, Henry County, Illinois

in Canada:

- Cornwall Township, Ontario, former name of South Stormont, township in Ontario

== See also ==
- North Cornwall Township, Lebanon County, Pennsylvania
- West Cornwall Township, Pennsylvania
- Cornwall County (disambiguation)
- Cornwall (disambiguation)
