= West Cornwall =

West Cornwall may refer to:

United States

- West Cornwall, Connecticut
- West Cornwall Township, Pennsylvania, in Lebanon County
- West Cornwall district, Cornwall, Vermont

United Kingdom

- West Cornwall (UK region)
- West Cornwall (UK Parliament constituency), created in 1832 and abolished in 1885

== See also ==
- Cornwall (disambiguation)
