= Edward Hopkins (MP) =

British politician

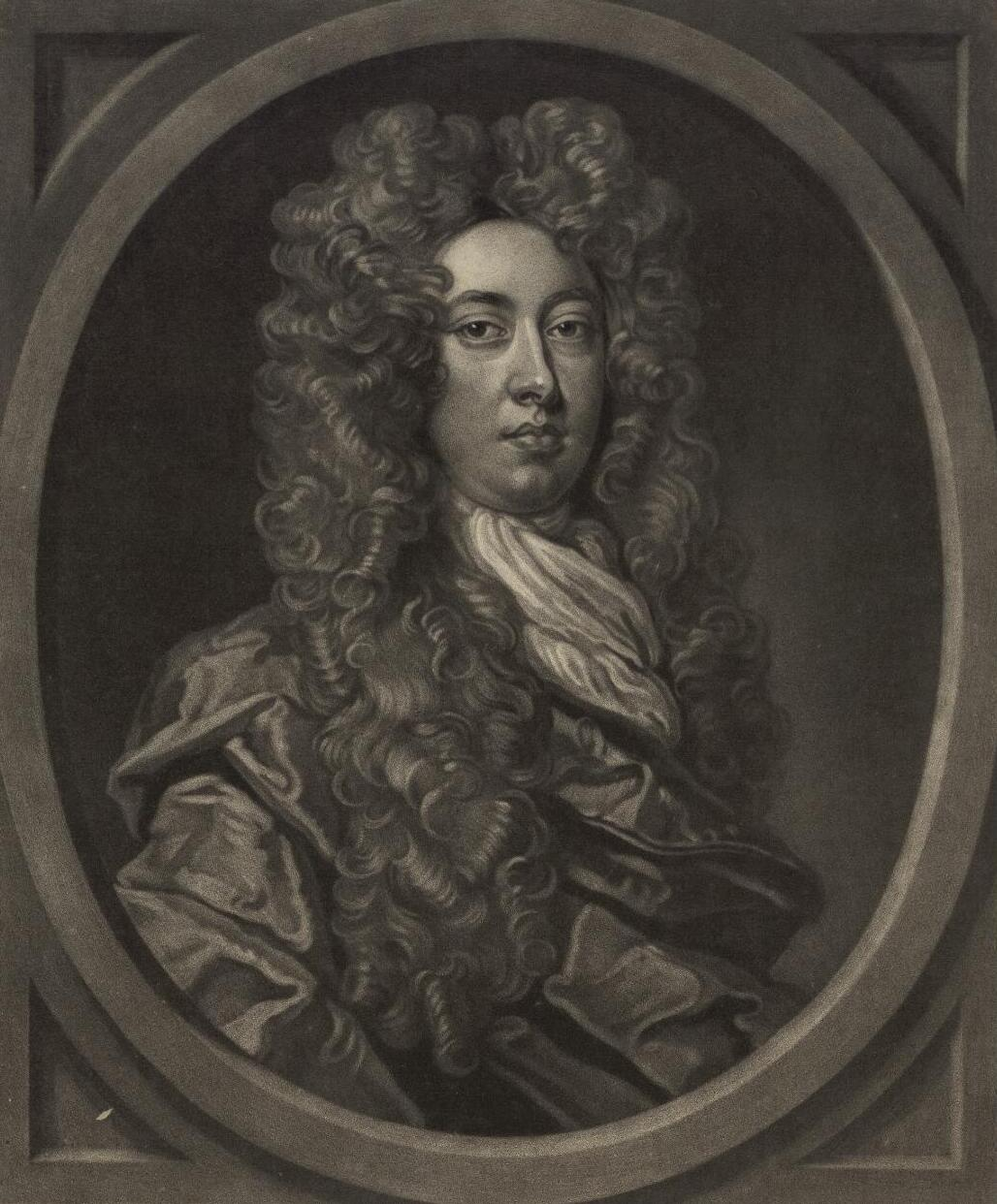

Member of Parliament
- In office 1701–1727
- Constituency: Coventry

Personal details
- Born: c. 1675; Warwickshire, England
- Died: 17 January 1736; Ewell, Surrey, England
- Resting place: St Michael's Church, Coventry, Warwickshire, England
- Political party: Whig
- Spouse: Anna Maria Chamberlayne
- Children: Richard Hopkins
- Parent(s): Richard Hopkins, Mary Johnson
- Education: Eton College
- Alma mater: Trinity College, Oxford

Edward Hopkins (c. 1675 – 17 January 1736) was a British Whig politician who sat in the English and British House of Commons between 1701 and 1727 and in the Parliament of Ireland from 1721 to 1727. He held a number of government posts in Ireland.

== Early life ==
Hopkins was the son of Richard Hopkins of Coventry, who was MP for that city. He was educated at Eton College between 1687 and 1692 and matriculated at Trinity College, Oxford on 2 July 1692. Between 1696 and 1700 he went on a Grand Tour through Flanders, France and Italy.

== Career ==
Hopkins was elected as a Whig Member of Parliament for Coventry at the second general election of 1701, but lost the seat at the 1702 English general election. He stood for Coventry again at the 1705 English general election, although he could not attend the poll as he had fallen off his horse in Pall Mall. However the election turned into a riot, in which Hopkins and his fellow Whig candidate were defeated. A re-run of the election was held in 1707 and this time Hopkins was returned. He was elected again at the 1708 general election.

In Parliament he was a teller for the Whigs on divisions, he voted for the naturalization of the Palatines in 1709 and for the impeachment of Dr Sacheverell in 1710. At the 1710 he was defeated in another hard contest. He transferred to Eye at the 1713 general election, where he was brought in on the interest of Lord Cornwallis.

Hopkins was returned unopposed as MP for Eye at the 1715 general election. Although returned at the 1722 general election, he spent time in Ireland, He was Irish Commissioner of Revenue from 1716 to 1722 and was a Member of the Parliament of Ireland for Dublin University from 1721 to 1727. He was Chief Secretary to the Duke of Grafton when the latter was Lord Lieutenant of Ireland between 1721 and 1724. He was also appointed Master of the Revels for Ireland for life in 1722 and a Privy Counsellor for Ireland the same year. He did not stand in the 1727 British general election.

== Later life and legacy ==
Hopkins married Anna Maria Chamberlayne, the daughter and coheiress of Dr. Hugh Chamberlayne of Alderton Manor and Hinton Hall, Suffolk, on 1 March 1725.

He died on 17 January 1736, at Ewell in Surrey and was buried at St Michael's Church, Coventry, as were his parents, wife, and eldest son. The family monument described him as "a person eminently distinguished for parts, politeness and all other amiable qualities" and noted his death date as "January 17th, 1735-6". Flat stones marked their burial places. As Coventry Cathedral, the church was destroyed during World War II.

He and his wife had three sons, who all died childless, and two daughters. He was succeeded by his eldest son Richard Hopkins, an MP for more than 30 years. His daughter Anne married William Northey, MP.

The Warwickshire local historian Mary Dormer Harris published an article about his memoirs in the English Historical Review, in 1919.

Parliament of England
| Preceded by Sir Christopher Hales, Bt; Thomas Hopkins | Member of Parliament for Coventry; 1701–1702; With: Sir Christopher Hales, Bt | Succeeded by Sir Christopher Hales, Bt; Thomas Gery |
Parliament of Great Britain
| Preceded by Sir Christopher Hales, Bt; Thomas Gery | Member of Parliament for Coventry; 1707 –1710; With: Sir Orlando Bridgeman, Bt | Succeeded by Robert Craven; Thomas Gery |
| Preceded by Sir Joseph Jekyll; Thomas Maynard | Member of Parliament for Eye; 1713–1727; With: Thomas Maynard 1713-1715; Thomas Smith 1715-1722; Hon. Spencer Compton 1722; James Cornwallis 1722-1727 | Succeeded by Stephen Cornwallis; John Cornwallis |
Political offices
| Preceded by Horatio Walpole | Chief Secretary for Ireland; 1721–1724 | Succeeded by Thomas Clutterbuck |
Parliament of Ireland
| Preceded by Marmaduke Coghill; Samuel Dopping | Member of Parliament for Dublin University; 1721-27; With: Marmaduke Coghill | Succeeded by Marmaduke Coghill; Samuel Molyneux |
