= Kernow =

Kernow may refer to:

- Cornwall (Cornish: Kernow), a county of the UK
- Kernow (bus company), a bus company in Cornwall
- Mebyon Kernow, a political party in Cornwall

== See also ==
- Cornouaille (Breton: Kernev), a region of Brittany, France
- Kern (disambiguation)
- Cornwall (disambiguation)
- Cornwallis (disambiguation)
- Cornouaille (disambiguation)
- Curnow (disambiguation)
