= Cornwall Island =

Cornwall Island may refer to:

- Cornwall Island (Western Australia), an island of Western Australia
- Cornwall Island (Nunavut), Canada
- Cornwall Island (Ontario), Canada
- Cornwall Island (Antarctica), off Robert Island in the South Shetland Islands

== See also ==
- List of islands of Cornwall
