= Neil Curnow =

English cricketer

Personal information
- Full name: Neil Stephen Curnow
- Born: 29 April 1982 (age 44); Truro, Cornwall, England
- Batting: Right-handed
- Bowling: Leg break

Domestic team information
- Years: Team
- 2000-2007: Cornwall

Career statistics
Competition	LA
Matches	3
Runs scored	37
Batting average	12.33
100s/50s	–/–
Top score	25
Balls bowled	–
Wickets	–
Bowling average	–
5 wickets in innings	–
10 wickets in match	–
Best bowling	–
Catches/stumpings	1/–
- Source: Cricinfo, 17 October 2010

Neil Stephen Curnow (born 29 April 1982) is an English cricketer. George is a left-handed batsman who bowls right-arm medium pace. He was born at Truro, Cornwall.

Curnow made his Minor Counties Championship debut for Cornwall in 2000 against Dorset. From 2000 to 2007, he represented the county in 17 Minor Counties Championship matches, the last of which came against Shropshire. George also represented Cornwall in the MCCA Knockout Trophy. His debut in that competition came against Wiltshire in 2000. From 2000 to 2006, he represented the county in 11 Trophy matches, the last of which came against Berkshire.

Curnow also represented Cornwall in 2 List A matches. These came against Cheshire and Sussex in the 2001 Cheltenham & Gloucester Trophy and Worcestershire in the 2002 Cheltenham & Gloucester Trophy. In his 2 List A matches, he scored 37 runs at a batting average of 12.33, with a high score of 25. In the field he took a single catch.

He currently plays club cricket for St Just Cricket Club in the Cornwall Cricket League.
