= Cornwallis (1789 ship) =

Indian and British ship

History

Great Britain
- Name: Cornwallis
- Namesake: Earl Cornwallis
- Owner: Originally:Lennox & Co.; 1803 & 4:Nasserwanji Manockji; 1809:Nasserwanjee Monackjee; 1813-1818:Nemchand Amichand; 1819-1833:Motichand Armichand; 1841:Khemchand Motichand
- Builder: Surat (Note: Three sources give the location as Surat. Two sources give it as Daman or Demaun. One source gives Bombay, but that source distinguishes only two locations, Bombay and Calcutta. The shipping registers simply report "India".)
- Launched: c.1789 (Note: Three sources give the year as 1788. Two sources give it as 1789. Three sources give it as 1790.)
- Fate: Burnt at Bombay Harbour June 1841

General characteristics
- Tons burthen: 653, or 666, or 667, or 716, or 719 (bm)
- Length: 123 ft (37 m)
- Sail plan: Full-rigged ship
- Armament: 22 guns
- Notes: Teak-built

Cornwallis was built probably at Surat around 1789, or possibly Demaun in 1790. Her name was originally Britannia, but it was changed to Cornwallis shortly before her completion. She served for some years in India as a country ship, before transferring her registry to Britain in 1797. She then served in private trade between Britain and India until 1809 or so when she transferred her registry back to Bombay. Thereafter she served as a country ship, though in both 1810 and again in 1817 she performed a voyage to Britain for the British East India Company. Thereafter she apparently continued to serve as a country ship with homeport of Bombay. She burnt there in June 1841 as she was about to take a cargo of cotton to China.

== Career ==
Cornwallis was admitted to British Registry on 12 May 1797 as a private vessel employed in the trade between Britain and India. On 24 June 1797 the cost of fitting her out in Britain was £7475 2s 10d.

Cornwallis entered Lloyd's Register in the supplemental pages to the 1800 volume. The entry notes that she had undergone a "good repair" in that year.

She served as a transport or troopship to support Major-General Sir David Baird's expedition in 1800 to the Red Sea. Baird was in command of the Indian army that was going to Egypt to help General Ralph Abercromby expel the French there. Baird landed at Kosseir, on the Egyptian side of the Red Sea. He then led his troops army across the desert to Kena on the Nile, and then to Cairo. He arrived in time for the battle of Alexandria.

Cornwallis underwent a second good repair in 1802. The cost of her repairs in 1802 was £11,273 7s 3d.

Lloyd's Register

| Year | Master | Owner | Trade | Notes |
|---|---|---|---|---|
| 1800 | Robertson | Lennox & Co. | London-India | 719 tons (bm), 22 guns |
| 1801 | Robertson | Lennox & Co. | London-India | 719 tons (bm), 22 guns |
| 1802 | Robertson; R. Elderton | Lennox & Co. | London-India | 719 tons (bm) |
| 1803 | R. Elderton | Lennox & Co. | London-India | 719 tons (bm) |
| 1804 | R. Elderton | Lennox & Co. | London-India | 719 tons (bm) |
| 1805 | R. Elderton | Lennox & Co. | London-India | 719 tons (bm) |
| 1806 | R. Elderton | Lennox & Co. | London-India | 719 tons (bm) |
| 1807 | R. Elderton | Lennox & Co. | London-India | 719 tons (bm) |
| 1808 | R. Elderton | Lennox & Co. | London-India | 719 tons (bm) |
| 1809 | R. Elderton | Lennox & Co. | London-India | 719 tons (bm) |

Captain Robert Robertson died on 26 March 1802 as Cornwallis was sailing from India to England.

In 1806 and 1808 Cornwallis sailed to China.

The Register of Shipping for 1809 agrees with Lloyd's Register for 1809 in almost all particulars, but gives the name of Cornwallis's master as R. Eleston.

Cornwallis then disappears from the registers. She had shifted her registry to Bombay, India. She appears on a list of ships belonging to or sailing out of Bombay as of 1 January 1811. At the time her owner was Nasserwanjee Monackjee. Another source gives the name of her owner in 1811 as possibly Porcher & Co.

In 1810 Cornwallis made the first of two voyages for the EIC. She left Bombay on 17 June, reached St Helena on 3 September, and arrived at Long Reach on 16 November.

She participated as one of the transports in the British reduction of Java, under the auspices of Lord Minto. She was in the second division, which left Malacca on 7 June 1811.

She may have sailed to China either before or after her role in the invasion. During this period her master was Robert Graham.

On 25 August 1815 Cornwallis, Graham, master, sailed for London from the Cape of Good Hope. On 30 September she sailed from St Helena. On 26 November she arrived at Gravesend, Kent.

In 1813 the EIC had lost its monopoly on the trade between India and Britain. British ships were then free to sail to India or the Indian Ocean under a licence from the EIC. On 23 January 1816 her agents applied for a licence authorizing Cornwallis to trade between the United Kingdom and the East Indies. She received the licence on 24 January. Cornwallis, Graham, master, sailed from Gravesend 23 February 1816, bound for Bombay.

Cornwallis also sailed to Bengal in 1816 from China.

Her second voyage for the EIC occurred in 1817. Captain Thomas Brown sailed Cornwallis from Calcutta on 25 March. She was at Diamond Harbour on 10 May, and Madras on 10 July. She reached the Cape of Good Hope on 27 October, and arrived at Spithead on 17 January 1818.

More voyages to China followed in 1818, 1822, 1825, 1826, and 1827 (two). Robert Graham was again her master until 1825, when D. Hardie replaced him. Hardie remained her master into 1829. P. Keys was Cornwallis's master between 1831 and 1833.

Cornwallis was reported as still sailing out of Bombay in 1838, and in 1841. In 1841 the name of her master was James Clark.

== Fate ==
In June 1841 Cornwallis was in Bombay harbour with a cargo of cotton for China when she caught fire. There was "a strong impression that this fine old ship was willfully set on fire."
