= Governor Cornwallis (ferry) =

History
- Name: Governor Cornwallis
- Owner: Halifax-Dartmouth Ferry Commission
- Operator: Halifax-Dartmouth Ferry Service
- Route: Halifax – Dartmouth.
- Builder: Hugh D. Weagle
- Completed: 1942
- Identification: official number 174894
- Fate: Caught fire, 22 December 1944
- Status: Out of service

General characteristics
- Tonnage: 248 GT
- Length: 41.1 m (134.8 ft)
- Beam: 15.5 m (50.9 ft)
- Height: 3.3 m (10.8 ft)
- Propulsion: Diesel electric engines

Governor Cornwallis was a ferry that operated on the Halifax–Dartmouth Ferry Service between the Nova Scotia cities of Halifax and Dartmouth between 1942 and 1944 before sinking in a spectacular fire.

== History ==
Named after Edward Cornwallis, the founder of Halifax, the ferry was built because of the heavy wartime traffic on the Halifax to Dartmouth ferries which had grown to 6 million passengers and 500,000 vehicles per year. The original tender went out in 1938 and 6 bids were received. The tender was ultimately won by a Dartmouth shipbuilder Hugh D. Weagle for $93,551. Governor Cornwallis was launched at 8:30am on November 20, 1941 and operational to the public December 6, 1942.

== Fate ==
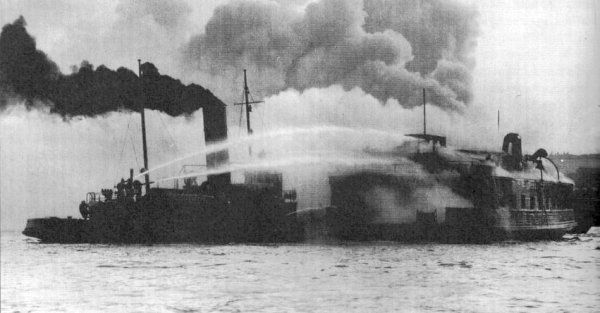
The fireboat Rouille responds to the blazing Governor Cornwallis

Throughout the short career of Governor Cornwallis, her superintendent's log book showed many mechanical problems, and was becoming a headache to the city of Halifax and Dartmouth. At 4:05pm on December 22, 1944, Governor Cornwallis left the Halifax dock with 20 motor vehicles and 300-400 passengers. Almost immediately the crew discovered a fire in the ceiling of the engine room. When Governor Cornwallis arrived at the Dartmouth dock all the passengers were let off and the boat was towed to the beaches of Georges Island to be burned. On January 12, 1945, the provincial fire marshal concluded that the fire was caused by poor installation of the heating furnace's smoke pipe. Governor Cornwallis has since slid off the beach and into deep waters off Georges Island.
