= Sonia Cornwall =

Canadian painter and rancher

- Born: Sonia Evelyn Drew Cowan; November 22, 1919; Kamloops, British Columbia, Canada
- Died: March 16, 2006 (aged 86); 150 Mile House, British Columbia, Canada
- Known for: Painter
- Spouse: Hugh Cornwall (m. 1947)
- Website: www.soniacornwall.com

Sonia Evelyn Drew Cornwall (née Cowan, 1919 – 2006) was a Canadian painter and rancher. She is in the British Columbia Cowboy Hall of Fame.

== Biography ==
Cornwall was born in Kamloops in 1919, the daughter of Charles and Vivian Cowan. Cornwall's mother, Vivian, had artistic leanings studying at the Banff School of Fine Arts and making friends with A.Y. Jackson.

After the death of her father in 1939, Cornwall, along with her mother and sister, became involved in the operation of the two family ranches, the Onward Ranch and the 150 Mile Ranch.

The Onward Ranch was a destination for a variety of Canadian artists Including A.Y. Jackson, Joseph Plaskett, Herbert Siebner, and Takao Tanabe.

In 1945, Vivian and Sonia along with Jackson created the Cariboo Art Society.

In 1946, at the age of 27 Cornwall enrolled at the Provincial Institute of Technology in Calgary, but dropped out after three months. She continued painting, learning techniques from books and radio programs.

In 1947, she married Hugh Cornwall, a fellow rancher. Together they worked on the family's two ranches. They eventually sold both ranches, retaining 2,500 acres that became the Jones Lake Ranch.

Cornwall's painting reflect her surroundings and life. Her subject matter includes Cariboo landscapes and ranch life as well as First Nations subjects.

In 1981, Cornwall co-founded the Station House Gallery which is located in the renovated BCR Station House in Williams Lake, British Columbia.

Cornwall died in 2006.
