= Cornwallis, West Virginia =

Unincorporated community in West Virginia, United States

Cornwallis
- Unincorporated community
- Location within the state of West Virginia Cornwallis (the United States)
- Coordinates: 39°13′38″N 81°7′6″W
- Country: United States
- State: West Virginia
- County: Ritchie
- Elevation: 673 ft (205 m)
- Time zone: UTC-5 (Eastern (EST))
  - Summer (DST): UTC-4 (EDT)
- GNIS ID: 1554194

Cornwallis is an unincorporated community in Ritchie County, West Virginia, United States. This community was named in honor of Lord Cornwallis.
