= Eugene Curnow =

- Born: Eugene Curnow; 8 February 1925; Lake City, Minnesota, US
- Died: 9 April 2010 (aged 85); Portland, Oregon, US

Eugene Curnow (8 February 1925 – 9 April 2010) was a veterinarian who pioneered the Mobile Pet Clinic concept in Portland, Oregon. He served as a medical corpsman with the Fourth Marine Division during World War II and survived the invasion and battle for Iwo Jima. His autobiography, Life the Hard Way: Up from Poverty Flat, was published in 2007.

== Early life ==
Dr. Curnow was born on February 8, 1925, in Lake City, Minnesota. He grew up in various towns in California, including a gold mining claim in the small settlement of Poverty Flat, population 12. In 1942, he graduated from Shasta Union High School in Redding, California. He then moved to Seattle where he enlisted in the Navy. He attended one quarter at Seattle College as a pre-med student before the Navy sent him to the University of New Mexico in Albuquerque, where he continued his pre-med studies for the rest of the year. In December 1943, he was assigned to the Hospital Corps School in San Diego, California, for a six-week training course. In February 1944, he was sent to Mare Island Navy Hospital at Imola, California, where he cared for returning combat veterans who were suffering from post-traumatic stress disorder (PTSD). He was transferred in October 1944 to Astoria, Oregon, and was assigned to the USS Sanborn, APA 193 as a member of the ship's crew.

== World War II service ==
His first overseas assignment was as a medical corpsman with the Fourth Marine Division, and he was sent to Iwo Jima. On February 19, 1945, he was part of a contingent of 36 medical corpsmen and 2,500 combat Marines that landed there. Their objective was Blue Beach Number 2. Of that group, only six corpsmen and 88 Marines were still alive when they left the island 10 days later. He came close to death twice during that time. He witnessed the famous American flag raising atop Mount Suribachi on Iwo Jima.

He returned to San Diego in November 1945 and was honorably discharged in January 1946. He married Glenora M. Murray on January 9, 1948, in Seattle, Washington. He went back to college and earned a Bachelor of Science degree in chemistry from Seattle University in 1950, a master's degree in biological sciences from Washington State University in 1952, and a Doctor of Veterinary Medicine (DVM) in 1955 from Washington State University. He attended Mt. Hood Community College from the spring of 1988 to the fall of 1999, auditing an advanced writing class. During this time, he wrote his autobiography, Life the Hard Way: Up From Poverty Flat.

== Veterinary career ==
He began veterinary practice in 1955 in Portland, Oregon. He had to give up hospital practice after having extensive intestinal surgery in 1973. He was told he could no longer stand for long periods of time, work more than six hours a day, or lift anything over 10 pounds. As he was deciding what to do next for a living, he said, "I recalled that during my years of hospital practice, I would receive at least five phone inquiries a week asking if any veterinarian in the Portland area made house calls," he stated in a 1975 interview.

He made the decision to establish a mobile practice. He converted an 18-foot-long mini-motor home into a Mobile Pet Clinic. It was equipped with a 110-volt auxiliary electrical generator, roof air-conditioning, thermostatically controlled propane heat, refrigerator, sink with hot and cold water, cooking range and oven, counter space, surgical and medical tables, bathroom with a shower, seating for four, and storage space for a well-stocked pharmacy, equipment, and supplies. The seven-foot windows on each side gave it a roomy feel. He would drive to a client's home, park at the curb, and treat the pet in the mobile unit. Dr. Curnow's wife, Glenora, assisted him in his practice. Because of his physical limitation, his practice was 90 percent cats and the rest small dogs.

This innovative idea earned him an article in National Geographic World magazine in January 1985. Because of this, he received letters from veterinarians from all over the world wanting to learn how to do the same thing. He wrote a 25-page "how-to" monograph and sold more than 6,000 copies by putting a small advertisement in the Journal of the American Veterinary Medical Association. He retired in 2006.

== Later life ==
Dr. Curnow didn't talk about his war experiences with anyone for nearly 60 years, when he suddenly began experiencing violent nightmares. He discovered that after a lifetime of internalizing the war, he was suffering from post-traumatic stress disorder (PTSD). After getting help from the Veteran's Administration, he used his experience to counsel other Marines suffering from PTSD through the VFW's Veterans Helping Veterans program. He did this for more than three years, also helping them obtain cash awards and medical help for their disabilities. Dr. Curnow and his wife had two daughters, Berniece and Yvonne, and two grandsons.

He died on 9 April 2010 in Portland, Oregon.

== Bibliography ==
Life the Hard Way: Up from Poverty Flat (2007)
