= Asparagus Island =

Tidal island in Mount's Bay, Cornwall, England

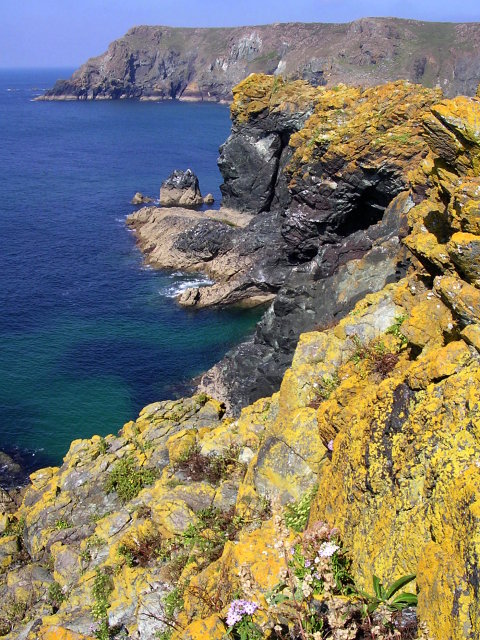
- Seaward side of Asparagus Island

- Location within Cornwall

Geography
- Location: Mount's Bay
- Coordinates: 49.974°N 5.233°W
- Length: 0.24 km (0.149 mi)
- Width: 0.1 km (0.06 mi)

Administration
- England
- County: Cornwall

Demographics
- Population: 0

Asparagus Island (Cornish: Enys Merlosowen) is a small tidal island on the eastern side of Mount's Bay, within the parish of Mullion, Cornwall, United Kingdom. It lies within Kynance Cove, a popular tourist site on the western side of The Lizard peninsula and is named after the rare wild asparagus (Asparagus prostratus) found there.

== Geography and geology ==
About 375 million years ago the molten rock, which eventually became the Lizard, was about 10 km (6 mi) below the surface of the earth and under immense heat and pressure. One of the rocks (peridotite), was rich in magnesium and iron, and changed through the heat and pressure to serpentinite as it pushed upwards from the Moho; the boundary of the Earth's crust and mantle. It finally reached the crust's surface, about 30° south of the equator as part of an ocean ridge, in the Rheic Ocean. Over the next 80 million years the Rheic Ocean disappears and the mass of rock heads north crossing the equator about 250 million years ago. The Tropic of Cancer is reached less than 100 million years ago and the rock, which becomes the Lizard, finally reaches 50° north at about the start of the last Ice Age. The Asparagus Island rocks are tremolite serpentine, a fine-grained and banded serpentine which is different from the primary serpentine on the Lizard (bastite serpentine) because it was subject to higher pressure within the crust.

The islands are here because the serpentine has been broken into blocks and invaded by other types of rock; including granite and basalt, which have been eroded by the sea. The tidal island is uninhabited and is flanked by two large rocks – Gull Rock and The Bishop. Before the winter storms of 2013/14 it was thought the island, which is cut off on almost every high tide, was connected to the mainland by a sand tombolo. The winter storms washed the sand away to reveal a rocky ridge, probably formed more than 100,000 years ago when sea levels were higher. At about half-tide, a snorting can be heard – the sound of the Devil's bellows – a blowhole on Asparagus Island, which was caused by the sea tunnelling along a fault. A second blowhole, the Post Office, is so named because there is enough suction to post a letter in it.

Access is via the South-west coastal footpath from a nearby National Trust car park.

== Wildlife and ecology ==
Asparagus Island is within the Lizard National Nature Reserve, only the best habitats and geological formations are designated as NNRs. The red data book species wild asparagus grows on the island and has been known there since the 1830s. In 1847 Gibson writes that it is in some danger of being eradicated because the (tourist) guides gather it so frequently.

== History ==
A number of microliths and other Mesolithic flints have been found and despite being reported as a flint working site, there is no evidence for this.

A Danish brig the Ospra hit Asparagus Island in the early hours of Sunday, 6 May 1832. She was carrying sugar and coffee (worth £10,000), on a voyage from Havana to Hamburg. The crew, with the exception of one man who drowned, climbed onto the island and walked ashore at dawn. Both the vessel and cargo were a total loss. The wreck became known in local legend, as the ″coffee wreck″.
