= George Cornewall (disambiguation) =

George Cornewall (1748–1819) was a British politician, soldier and baronet.

George Cornwall or Cornewall may also refer to:

== Other members of the Herefordshire family ==
- George Cornwall (MP) (died 1562), MP for Herefordshire
- Sir George Cornewall, 3rd Baronet (1774–1835) of the Cornewall baronets
- Sir George Cornewall, 5th Baronet (1833–1908) of the Cornewall baronets

== Others ==
- Captain George Cornwall, see Queen (East Indiaman)
- George Cornwall (aircraft designer)

== See also ==
- George Cornewall Lewis (1806–1863), British statesman
- George Cornwell, British railway engineer and building contractor in Australia
