= Cornwallis (1803 ship) =

History

France
- Launched: 1802
- Captured: 1803

United Kingdom
- Name: Cornwallis
- Owner: 1804: Robe & Co. (Note: The name appears in the shipping registers as Roob and as Robb.); 1809:Smith & Co.; 1811:J. Williams; 1826:G.E. Henderson
- Acquired: 1804 purchase
- Fate: Last listed in Lloyd's List in 1834.

General characteristics
- Tons burthen: 170, or 177, or 178, or 179, or 180, or 184, or 186 (bm)
- Sail plan: Snow; later ship
- Complement: 1803:30; 1809:25
- Armament: 1803:10 × 12&6-pounder guns; 1806:10 × 4-pounder guns; 1809:10 × 12&9-pounder guns; 1811:2 × 9-pounder + 8 × 12-pounder guns; 1813:4 × 3-pounder guns + 4 × 12-pounder carronades

Cornwallis was a French vessel launched in 1802 that came into British hands in 1803. Under a sequence of owners she traded with the West Indies, Spain, the Cape of Good Hope, and Singapore. She is last listed in 1834.

== Career ==
Bristol-based Archibald Robe and Co. purchased the French prize in 1803 and named her Cornwall1s. She entered Lloyd's Register in 1804 with J. Baker, master, and Robe & Co., owners. Her trade was Bristol-Surinam. James Baker received a letter of marque for the snow Cornwallis on 22 December 1803.

Baker was her master for 1804-5, and then Alleyne replaced him. One source states that in 1806 Robe & Co. sold Cornwallis to Smith & Co., after she had made three voyages to the West Indies for Robe & Co. However, the first indicator of a change of owner and master occurs in the 1809 volume of the Register of Shipping. The new master was J. Thomas, and the new owner Smith & Co. Her trade became London-Cadiz. On 21 November 1809 James Thomas received a letter of marque.

The 1811 Register of Shipping shows Cornwallis's master changing to W. Daldy and her owner to I. Williams. Her trade changed to London-Gibraltar. In 1814, her burthen changes from 186 to 177 tons. Thereafter her burthen is 177 or 179 tons, depending on the year. She is no longer armed after mid-1816.

Year	Master	Owner	Trade
1812	W. Dalby	J.Williams	London-Havana
1813	W. Dalby	J.Williams	London-Mogador; London-Demerara
1814	W. Dalby; Brown	J.Williams	London-Demerara; London-Antwerp
1815	H. Brown	J.Williams	London-Antwerp
1816	Huntley	J.Williams	London-Cape of Good Hope
1818	Huntley	Williams	London-Cape of Good Hope
1819	Huntley	Williams	London-Cape of Good Hope
1820	Short	J. Williams	London-Cape of Good Hope
1821	Bourke	Williams	London-Cape of Good Hope
1822	Bourke; Henderson	Williams	London-Cape of Good Hope
1823	Henderson	Williams	London-Cape of Good Hope
1824	Henderson	Williams	London-Cape of Good Hope
1825	Henderson	Williams	London-Cape of Good Hope
1826	Henderson	Williams	London-Singapore

On 26 October 1825, Cornwallis sailed for Singapore. Cornwallis left Singapore on 7 May 1826 and was off Hastings by 2 October.

In 1826 Henderson purchased Cornwallis. She then underwent a thorough repair. A list of ships trading to India and eastward of the Cape of Good Hope showed Cornwallis, Edmond Henderson, master, and G.E. Henderson, owner, scheduled to sail from London Docks on 3 December 1828 for the Cape.

Year	Master	Owner	Trade	Notes
1827	Henderson	Henderson	London	
1828	Henderson	Henderson	London	
1829	Henderson	Henderson	London-Cape of Good Hope	

The last listing for Cornwallis in the Register of Shipping is in 1833. It shows Henderson, master, and Henderson, owner. For her trade it simply lists "London". The entry in the 1834 volume of Lloyd's Register simply lists Henderson as master and trade as London. This is the last listing for Cornwallis.
