= Stephen Cornwallis =

British Army officer and politician

Major-General The Honourable Stephen Cornwallis MP
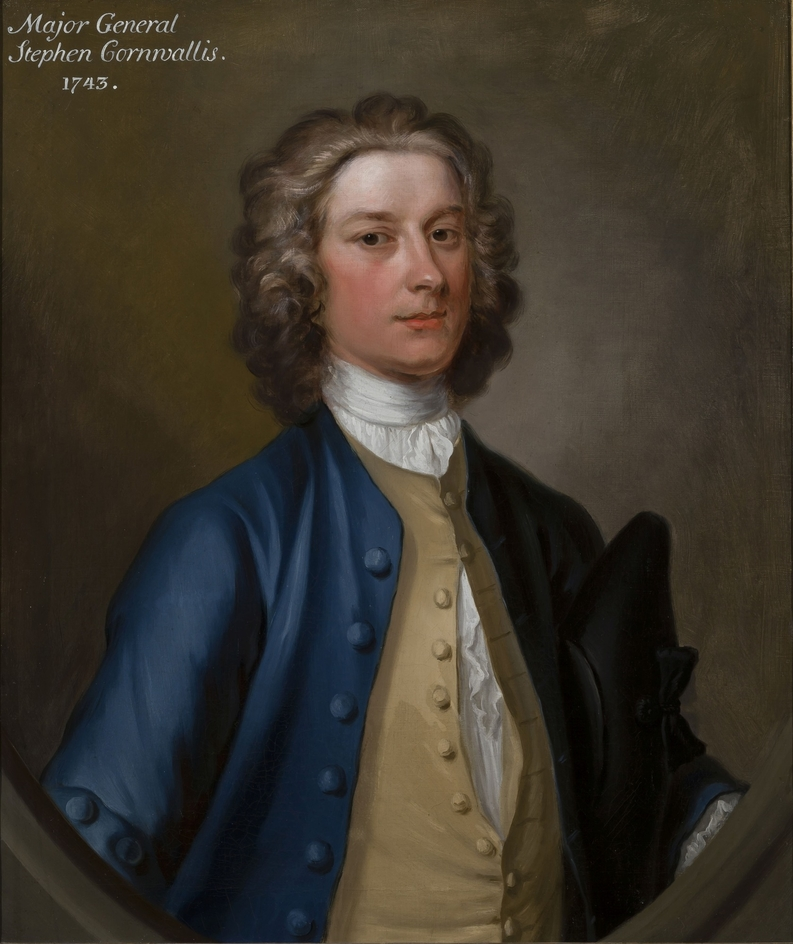
- Portrait after John Vanderbank, 1743
- Born: 23 December 1703
- Died: 12 May 1743 (aged 39); Germany
- Education: Eton College
- Spouse: Mrs Pearson (m. 1732–1743)
- Military career
- Allegiance: Great Britain
- Branch: British Army
- Service years: 1719–1743
- Rank: Major-General
- Conflicts: First Maroon War; War of the Austrian Succession

Member of Parliament for Eye
- In office 1727–1743

Major-General Stephen Cornwallis (23 December 1703 – 12 May 1743) was a career British Army officer and politician who sat in the House of Commons from 1727 to 1743.

== Early life ==
Cornwallis was the third son of Charles Cornwallis, 4th Baron Cornwallis, and his wife Lady Charlotte Butler, daughter of Richard Butler, 1st Earl of Arran. After attending school at Eton College in 1718, he joined the army. He joined the 2nd Foot Guards in 1719 as ensign and was promoted to a captain in the Dragoons in 1723. By 1725 he was captain and lieutenant-colonel in the 34th Foot.

== Political career ==
At the 1727 British general election, Cornwallis was returned unopposed as Member of Parliament for the family borough of Eye, together with his brother John. They both voted regularly with the Government, but it is not always possible to identify which brother is referred to in the Parliamentary records.

Stephen Cornwallis may have spoken for the Hessians in 1731, or the army in 1733, but did speak on the Address in 1732 - apparently ‘little to the purpose’. He was promoted to Colonel of 34th (Cumberland) Regiment of Foot in 1732. He and his brother were returned unopposed again for Eye at the 1734 British general election.

Cornwallis spoke against a place bill in 1735 and possibly on the Spanish convention in 1739. He became colonel of Devonshire Regiment in 1738 and brigadier general in 1739. He and his brother John Cornwallis were returned again at the 1741 British general election. In 1742 Stephen Cornwallis was promoted to major general.

== Personal life ==
Cornwallis married Mrs Pearson in August 1732, but they had no issue. He died on 12 May 1743. His other surviving brothers were his elder brother Charles Cornwallis, 1st Earl Cornwallis, and his younger twin brothers Edward Cornwallis and Frederick Cornwallis.

Parliament of Great Britain
Preceded by Edward Hopkins; Hon. James Cornwallis	Member of Parliament for Eye; 1727–1743; With: John Cornwallis	Succeeded by Hon. John Cornwallis; Hon. Edward Cornwallis
Military offices
Preceded by Robert Hayes	Colonel of Stephen Cornwallis's Regiment of Foot; 1732–1738	Succeeded by Lord James Cavendish
Preceded by Edward Montagu	Colonel of Stephen Cornwallis's Regiment of Foot; 1738–1743	Succeeded by Robinson Sowle
