= Alan Cornwall =

Alan Cornwall may refer to:

- Alan Cornwall (priest) (1858–1932), Archdeacon of Cheltenham
- Alan Cornwall (cricketer) (1898–1984), English cricketer
