= HMS Rover (1796) =

Sloop of the Royal Navy

History

Great Britain
- Name: HMS Rover
- Builder: Nathaniel Tynes, Bermuda
- Launched: 1796
- Fate: Wrecked 23 June 1798

General characteristics
- Type: Sloop-of-war
- Tons burthen: 356 (bm)
- Length: 104 ft 0 in (31.7 m) (gundeck); 80 ft 1 1/2 in (24.4 m) (keel)
- Beam: 26 ft 1 in (8.0 m)
- Depth of hold: 16 ft 0 1/4 in (4.9 m)
- Propulsion: Sails
- Sail plan: Full-rigged ship
- Complement: 80
- Armament: 16 × 24-pounder carronades
- Notes: 3 masts

HMS Rover was a 16-gun sloop-of-war that the Royal Navy purchased in 1796, commissioned in 1798, and that was wrecked in early 1798. In her brief career she captured one French privateer.

== Design ==
Rover was designed by Goodrich & Co., and Captain Francis Pender contracted her building in October 1795. She was initially planned as a brig, but during construction she was lengthened and given a full ship rig. An Admiralty Order of 10 November 1795 agreed the purchase, and she was added to the establishment by a second Admiralty Order dated 1 January 1796. She was purchased on the stocks and launched in 1796.

== Service ==
Rover was rated as a sloop and she was commissioned as such in April 1798 under Commander George Irwin.

On 16 May 1798 Rover was sailing towards Bermuda when she captured and sent in the French privateer sloop Jean Bart. Jean Bart was armed with 14 guns and had a crew of 57 men. She was last in Porto Rico and had captured three American ships:

- Thomas, sailing from Liverpool to Philadelphia;
- Merchant, sailing from New York to Bristol; and
- Diana, sailing from New York to Demarara.

== Fate ==
Rover was wrecked in the Gulf of St Lawrence on 23 June 1798, but her crew were saved. She was convoying the transport Elizabeth to Quebec when she entered a fog. The pilot got a brief sight of land that he believed was Scaterie Island. As a result, he was comfortable continuing to maintain course. When lookouts spotted breakers ahead early in the evening it was too late to turn her and she struck rocks on Cape Breton Island. Eventually a seaman was able to swim to shore with a line that the crew then used to leave Rover, which was by then filling rapidly with water. All the men reached the shore and the crew finally abandoned her on 26 June, at which time they sailed her boats to Sydney, Nova Scotia. The court martial attributed the loss of Rover to a very strong current.
