= Cornwallis (1812 ship) =

History

United Kingdom
- Name: Cornwallis
- Owner: Forbes & Co.
- Builder: James Scott & John Hunter, Fort Gloucester, Calcutta
- Launched: 30 December 1812
- Fate: Foundered 1822
- Notes: Teak-built three-decker ship

General characteristics
- Tons burthen: 696, or 700, or 717 35/94, or 718, or 720 (bm)
- Length: 129 ft 9 in (39.5 m)
- Beam: 36 ft 4 in (11.1 m)
- Propulsion: Sail

Cornwallis was launched in 1812 at Calcutta and lost in 1822 at Île de France (Mauritius). She first appears in Lloyd's Register for 1818 with J. Charitie, master and owner, and trade London—India. The Register of Shipping for 1822 gives her master as Charitte, and her trade as London—Bengal.

She was lost in 1822. She sailed from Calcutta on or about 20 January 1822, bound for Mauritius. She was "spoken to" on or about 18 February, southward of the Line, but not seen again.
