= Rosa 'Duchess of Cornwall' =

Rose cultivar

Rosa Duchess of Cornwall
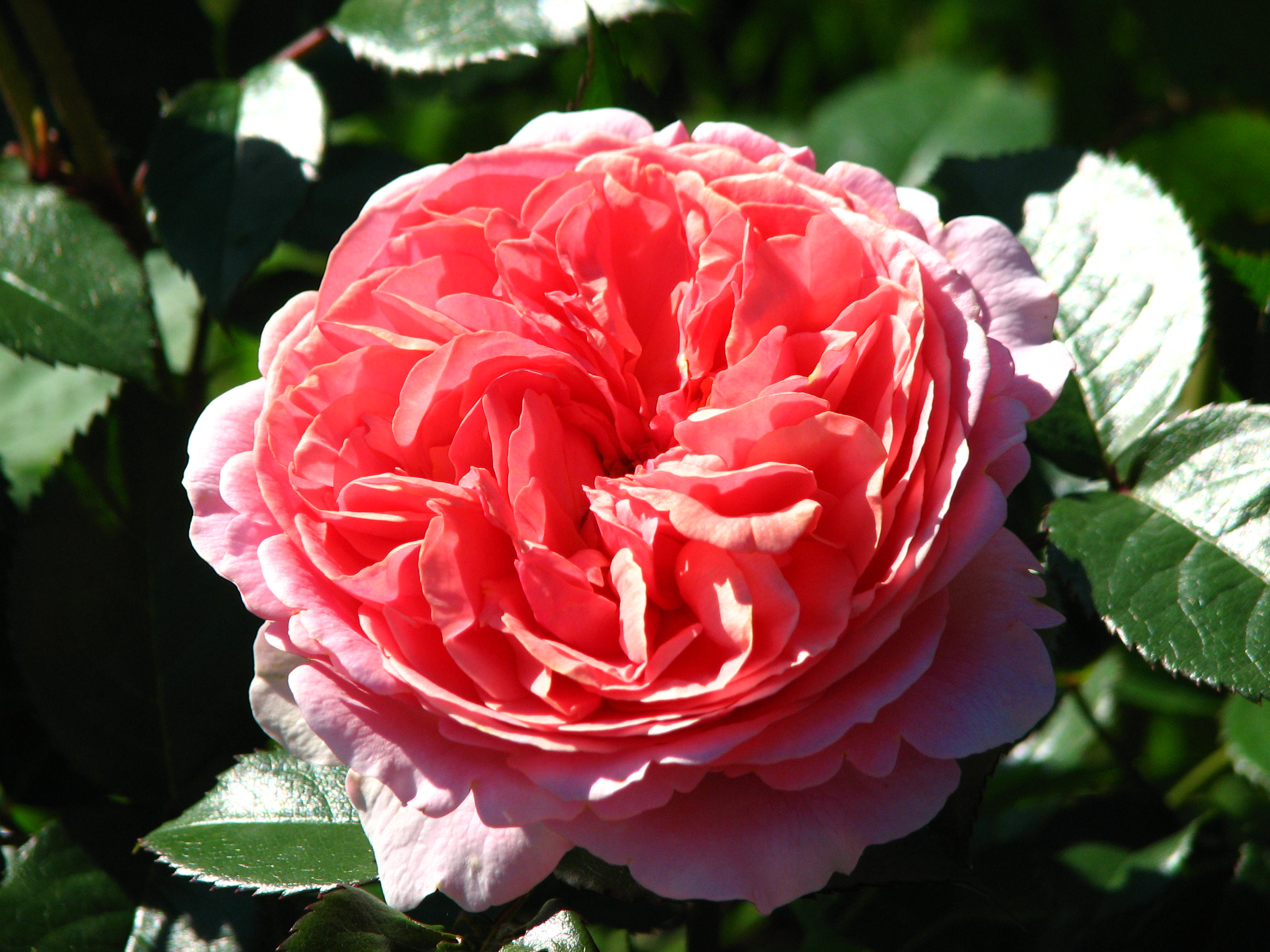
- Cultivar group: Hybrid Tea
- Cultivar: 'Duchess of Cornwall'
- Marketing names: Ali Man, Ali Mau, Chippendale, 'Music Hall', Tan97159
- Origin: Evers/Tantau (Germany 2005)

Rosa 'Duchess of Cornwall' is an orange blend rose cultivar bred by Hans Jürgen Evers from Rosen Tantau in Germany and introduced in 2005. The nostalgic hybrid tea rose is known as 'Music Hall' in France, and as 'Chippendale' in Germany. According to Robert Markley, it is already one of Tantau's most successful roses.

== Naming ==
The name 'Duchess of Cornwall' was chosen in the UK in honour of Camilla Parker Bowles to celebrate her wedding to the Prince of Wales, after which she assumed the title Duchess of Cornwall (later Queen Camilla). She received it during a tour at BBC Gardeners' World Live at the National Exhibition Centre (NEC) in Birmingham in June 2005.

The German cultivar name 'Chippendale' alludes to the ornate English Rococo style called Chippendale.

== Description ==
The rose is described as a very double apricot flower. It has an old fashioned, quartered bloom form with up to 100 petals, and a light, spicy fragrance. The colour is weather dependent, reaching from deep orange to soft pink. The buds open slowly to medium-sized flowers with a diameter of 8 to 10 centimetres (3.1 to 3.9 in), are well suited as cut flowers and appear abundantly in flushes throughout the season.

The vigorous, upright shrub reaches a height of 0.7 to 1.2 m (2.3 to 3.9 ft), has dark and glossy foliage, and starts its flowering season very early. Tantau recommends the plantation in small groups, but the shrub can also be grown solitary or in containers.

== Awards ==
In 2012, it was granted the Award of Garden Merit by the Royal Horticultural Society. At the rose show in the Rosarium Uetersen in 2013, the cultivar won a bronze medal in the category Most Beautiful Rose.
