= Marquis Cornwallis (ship) =

Marquis Cornwallis may refer to a number of ships named for Charles Cornwallis, 1st Marquess Cornwallis:

- Marquis Cornwallis (1789 ship), a 654 burthen ton merchantman that made a voyage transporting convicts to Australia.
- Marquis Cornwallis, was an East Indiaman launched in 1801, that the Royal Navy purchased in 1805 and commissioned as HMS Cornwallis, renamed Akbar in 1811, and sold in the 1860s.
- Marquis Cornwallis (1802 ship) was a brig launched at Sunderland. She traded widely, to the West Indies, the Iberian peninsula, and the Baltic. The American privateer Chasseur captured her in 1814 but released her as a cartel. She was wrecked in 1823.
