= Curnow Range =

Mountain range in Nevada, United States

- Location within Nevada

Highest point
- Elevation: 1,659 m (5,443 ft)

Geography
- Country: United States
- State: Nevada
- District: Washoe County
- Range coordinates: 39°42′51″N 119°38′06″W
- Topo map: USGS Griffith Canyon

The Curnow Range is a mountain range in Washoe County, Nevada.
