= Cornwell =

- Pronunciation: /ˈkɔːrnwəl/
- Language: English

Origin
- Language: Old English
- Origin: crana + wælla
- Meaning: 'crane's spring/stream'

Cornwell can refer to:

== People ==
- Almon Cornwell (1820–1893), American farmer-politician in Wisconsin
- Anita Cornwell (1923–2023), American author
- Bernard Cornwell (born 1944), British historical novelist
- Charlotte Cornwell (1949–2021), British actress
- David Cornwell (1931–2020), English writer of espionage novels writing as John le Carré
- David L. Cornwell (1945–2012), U.S. Representative from Indiana
- Dean Cornwell (1892–1960), American illustrator and muralist
- Edna Brady Cornwell (1868–1958), wife of former Governor of West Virginia John J. Cornwell
- Eve Cornwell (born 1997), British YouTuber and former lawyer
- Grant Cornwell, eleventh President of The College of Wooster, in Wooster, Ohio, USA
- Greg Cornwell (born 1938), Australian politician
- Hugh Cornwell (born 1949), English musician and songwriter, lead singer with The Stranglers
- John Cornwell (born 1940), English journalist and historian
- John J. Cornwell (1867–1953), American politician
- John Travers Cornwell (Jack Cornwell) (1900–1916), English naval hero, Victoria Cross recipient; Battle of Jutland, Denmark, 1916
- Judy Cornwell (born 1940), English actress and novelist
- Marshall S. Cornwell (18 October 1871–1898), American newspaper publisher, writer, and poet
- Matt Cornwell (born 1985), English rugby union player
- Patricia Cornwell (born 1956), American author
- Phil Cornwell (born 1957), English comedian, actor, impressionist and writer
- Robert Cornwell (1835–1927), American soldier, lawyer, and educator
- Stanley Cornwell Lewis (1905–2009), British portrait painter and illustrator
- W. Don Cornwell (born 1948), CEO Granite Broadcasting
- William B. Cornwell (1864–1926) American lawyer, businessperson, newspaper editor and publisher, and railroad and timber executive
- William H. Cornwell (1843–1903), American businessman and Hawaiian politician
- William J. Cornwell (1809–1896), New York politician

== Places ==
- Cornwell, Oxfordshire, England
- Cornwell, Virginia, United States
- Mount Cornwell (Antarctica)
- Mount Cornwell (Canada)

== Other uses ==
- Cornwell Tools, Wadsworth, Ohio-based professional tool manufacturer for the automotive and aviation industries

== See also ==
- Cornwells Heights (disambiguation)
