= Richard Cornwall =

Richard Cornwall may refer to:

- Richard of Cornwall (1209–1272; r. 1257–1272), King of the Romans
- Richard Cornwall (died 1533), English politician
- Richard Cornwall (died 1569) (1493–1569), English politician
- Richie Cornwall (1946–2021), American basketball player formally called Richard T. Cornwall

== See also ==
- Richard Rufus of Cornwall (d. c. 1260), English philosopher
- Richard II (1367–1400; r. 1377–1399), King of England; Duke of Cornwall from 1376 to 1377
- Richard of York (1411–1460), Duke of Cornwall from October to December 1460
