= Edward Cornwallis =

British Army general (1713–1776)

Lieutenant-General The Honourable Edward Cornwallis
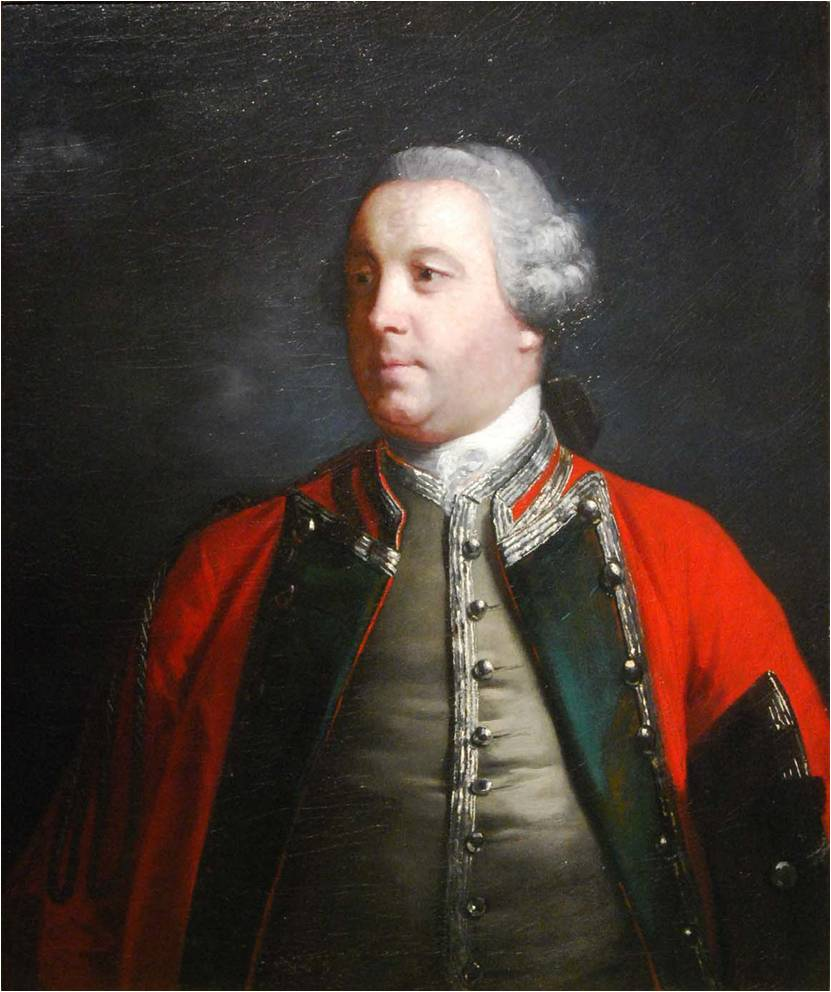
- Portrait by Sir Joshua Reynolds, 1756

Governor of Nova Scotia
- In office 1749–1752
- Monarch: George II
- Preceded by: Richard Philipps
- Succeeded by: Peregrine Hopson

Governor of Gibraltar
- In office 14 June 1761 – 1 January 1776
- Monarch: George II
- Preceded by: Earl of Home
- Succeeded by: Baron Heathfield

Personal details
- Born: 5 March 1713 London, England
- Died: 14 January 1776 (aged 62) Gibraltar
- Resting place: Culford
- Spouse: Mary Townshend
- Relations: Charles Cornwallis, 3rd Baron Cornwallis (grandfather); Richard Butler, 1st Earl of Arran (grandfather); Charles Cornwallis, 4th Baron Cornwallis (father); Charles Cornwallis, 1st Marquess Cornwallis (nephew); James Cornwallis, 4th Earl Cornwallis (nephew); William Cornwallis (nephew); Frederick Cornwallis (brother); Stephen Cornwallis (brother); Charles Cornwallis, 1st Earl Cornwallis (brother)
- Parent: Charles Cornwallis, 4th Baron Cornwallis (father)

Military service
- Allegiance: Kingdom of Great Britain
- Branch/service: British Army
- Years of service: 1730s–1776
- Rank: Lieutenant-General
- Unit: 8th Foot
- Commands: 20th Foot, 40th Foot, 24th Foot
- Battles/wars: War of the Austrian Succession; Battle of Fontenoy; Jacobite rising of 1745; Battle of Culloden; Father Le Loutre's War; Seven Years' War; Raid on Rochefort

Lieutenant-General Edward Cornwallis (5 March 1713 (Note: [Old Style] February 22, 1713)– 14 January 1776) was a British Army officer and member of the aristocratic Cornwallis family. After Cornwallis fought in Scotland, putting down the Jacobite rebellion of 1745, he was appointed Groom of the Chamber for King George II (a position he held for the next 17 years). He was then made Governor of Nova Scotia (1749–1752), one of the colonies in North America, and assigned to establish the new town of Halifax, Nova Scotia. (Note: ... from 1713 to 1749 Nova Scotia was neglected by England, but the crafty designs of the French to acquire by fraud what they could not obtain by force drew the attention of the British public to the importance of the colony, and encouragements were held out to retired officers, &c. to whom officers of grants of land were made; 3760 adventurers were embarked with their families for the colony; Parliament granted 40,000ℓ. for their support, and they landed at Chebucto harbour, where the town of Halifax was soon erected by the new emigrants under the command of their Governor the Hon. Edward Cornwallis Martin 1837, p.7) Later Cornwallis returned to London, where he was elected as MP for Westminster and married the niece of Robert Walpole, Great Britain's first Prime Minister. Cornwallis was next appointed as Governor of Gibraltar.

Cornwallis arrived in Nova Scotia during a period of conflict with the local indigenous Miꞌkmaq peoples of peninsular Nova Scotia. The Mi'kmaq opposed the founding of Halifax and conducted war raids on the colony. Cornwallis responded with the extirpation proclamation of 1749, orders to bring back scalps of rebels. His administration erected forts at Grand Pre, Chignecto and Halifax and organised a militia of 840 men. Despite these efforts, the conflict would continue for several years after Cornwallis's term.

Despite the war footing, Cornwallis's administration would establish the Nova Scotian government, consisting of an Executive and Legislative Council, governed by the first constitution in a Canadian colony. It instituted the first British law courts in Canada; established a public school for orphans; and respected religious diversity through separation of church and state. It recruited European immigrants to Halifax, establishing the first Jewish community, the first ethnic German community, made up of Protestants from Germany and Switzerland, and the first Protestant dissenting congregation in a Canadian colony.

Cornwallis is commemorated in Nova Scotia in the naming of its rivers, parks, streets, towns, and buildings. Such historic commemoration of Cornwallis has become controversial because of the extirpation proclamation. In Halifax, there were numerous protests at a statue of Cornwallis in a downtown park, leading to its removal. A Halifax church, junior high school, street and park all are no longer named after Cornwallis. Other municipalities are also removing Cornwallis's name.

== Early life ==
Cornwallis's grandfather, Charles Cornwallis, 3rd Baron Cornwallis, was First Lord of the Admiralty. His maternal grandfather was Richard Butler, 1st Earl of Arran, a Governor of Ireland (1682–1684). Cornwallis was the son of Charles, 4th Baron Cornwallis, and Lady Charlotte Butler, daughter of the Earl of Arran and his wife. The Cornwallis family possessed estates at Culford in Suffolk and the Channel Islands.

Cornwallis and his twin brother, Frederick Cornwallis, were made royal pages at the age of 12. They were enrolled at Eton at age 14. Their older brother, Stephen Cornwallis, the third son born, was a career officer and rose to the rank of major-general in the Army.

Initially it was not determined which twin brother would enter the church and which the military. The matter was decided by accident: one day, Frederick fell and the injury paralysed his arm. He would take the religious path. At age 18, in 1731, Edward was commissioned into the 47th Regiment of Foot.

== Military career ==
In the 20th regiment, led by Brig. General Thomas Bligh, Edward Cornwallis participated in the Battle of Fontenoy during the War of the Austrian Succession. He fought under Colonel Craig, who was killed in action. Cornwallis took over command of the regiment and organised a retreat. Cornwallis's regiment lost eight officers and 385 men. While the retreat was respected by the military, the British public chided the expedition for their losses.

Cornwallis played an important role in suppressing the Jacobite rising of 1745. After fighting with the victorious government soldiers at the Battle of Culloden, he led a regiment of 320 men north for the pacification of the Scottish Highlands. The Duke of Cumberland ordered him to "plunder, burn and destroy through all the west part of Invernesshire called Lochaber." Cumberland added: "You have positive orders to bring no more prisoners to the camp." Cumberland's campaign was later described by one historian as one of unrestrained violence. Cornwallis ordered his men to chase off livestock, and destroy crops and food stores. Against Cornwallis's orders, some soldiers raped and murdered non-combatants in an incident to intimidate Jacobites from further rebellion.

In 1747 Cornwallis was made a Groom of the Bedchamber, serving in the households of both kings George II and George III until 1764. He also became MP for Eye from 1743 to 1749 and then for Westminster for 1753 to 1762, in Parliament he was seen as an Old Whig.

== Governor of Nova Scotia ==
=== Founding of Halifax ===
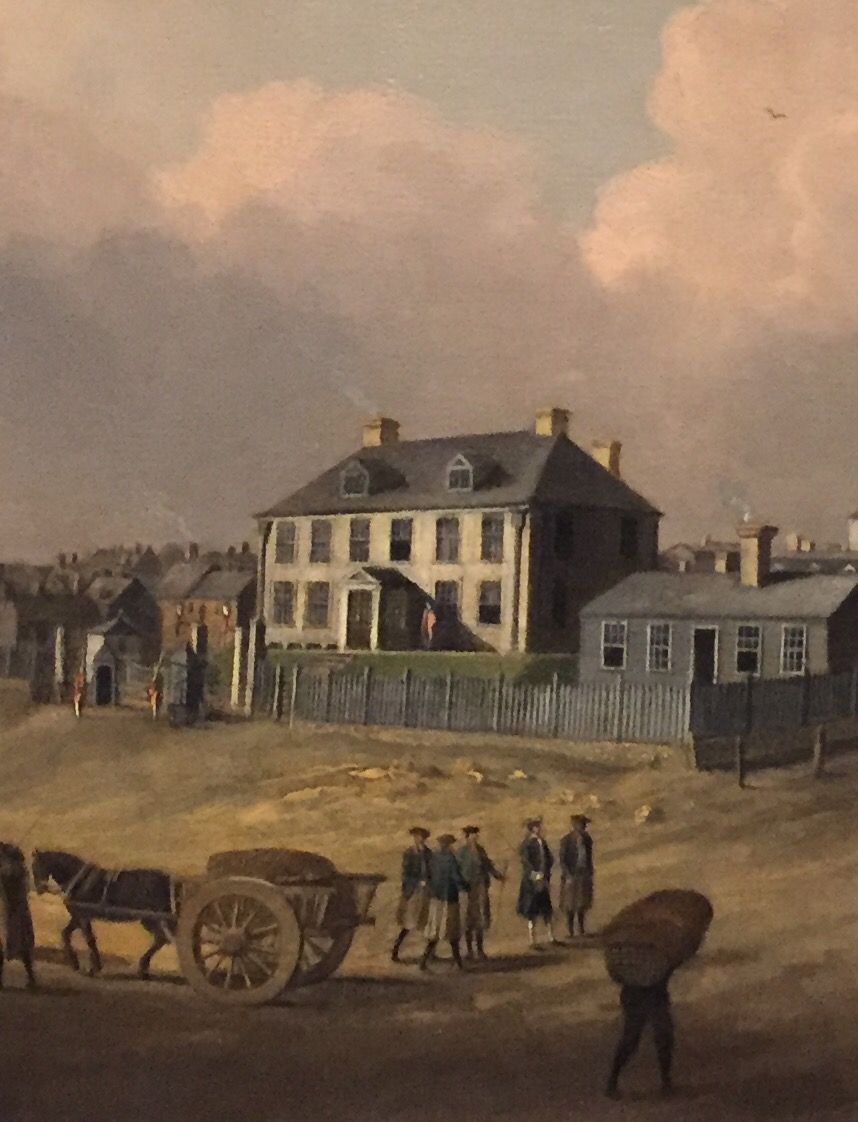
Cornwallis built Governor's House (1749). (Province House was later also built on this site and it is furnished still with his Nova Scotia Council table.)

The British Government appointed Cornwallis as Governor of Nova Scotia with the task of establishing a new British settlement to counter France's Fortress Louisbourg. In this period, governors were frequently selected from senior officers. He sailed from England aboard HMS Sphinx on 14 May 1749, followed by a settlement expedition of 15 vessels (including HMS Baltimore and HMS Winchelsea) carrying about 2500 settlers. Cornwallis arrived at Chebucto Harbour on 21 June 1749, followed by the rest of the fleet five days later. The expedition suffered only one death during the passage, due to careful preparations, good ventilation on the ships, and good luck. This was remarkable at a time when the lengthy transatlantic expeditions regularly lost large numbers of persons to infectious disease.

Cornwallis immediately had to decide where to site the town. Settlement organisers in England had recommended Point Pleasant, due to its close access to the ocean and ease of defence. His naval advisers opposed this site because it lacked shelter and had shallows preventing the docking of ocean-going ships. They wanted the town to be located at the head of Bedford Basin, a sheltered location with deep water. Others favoured Dartmouth.

Cornwallis decided to land the settlers and build the town at the site of present-day Downtown Halifax; it was halfway up the harbour with deep water, and protected by a natural, defensible hill (later known as Citadel Hill). By 24 July, the plans of the town had been drawn up. In August lots were drawn to award settlers their town plots in a settlement that was to be named "Halifax" after Lord Halifax, the President of the Board of Trade and Plantations. Lord Halifax (likely his staff) had drawn up the expedition plans for the British Government.

=== Father Le Loutre's War ===
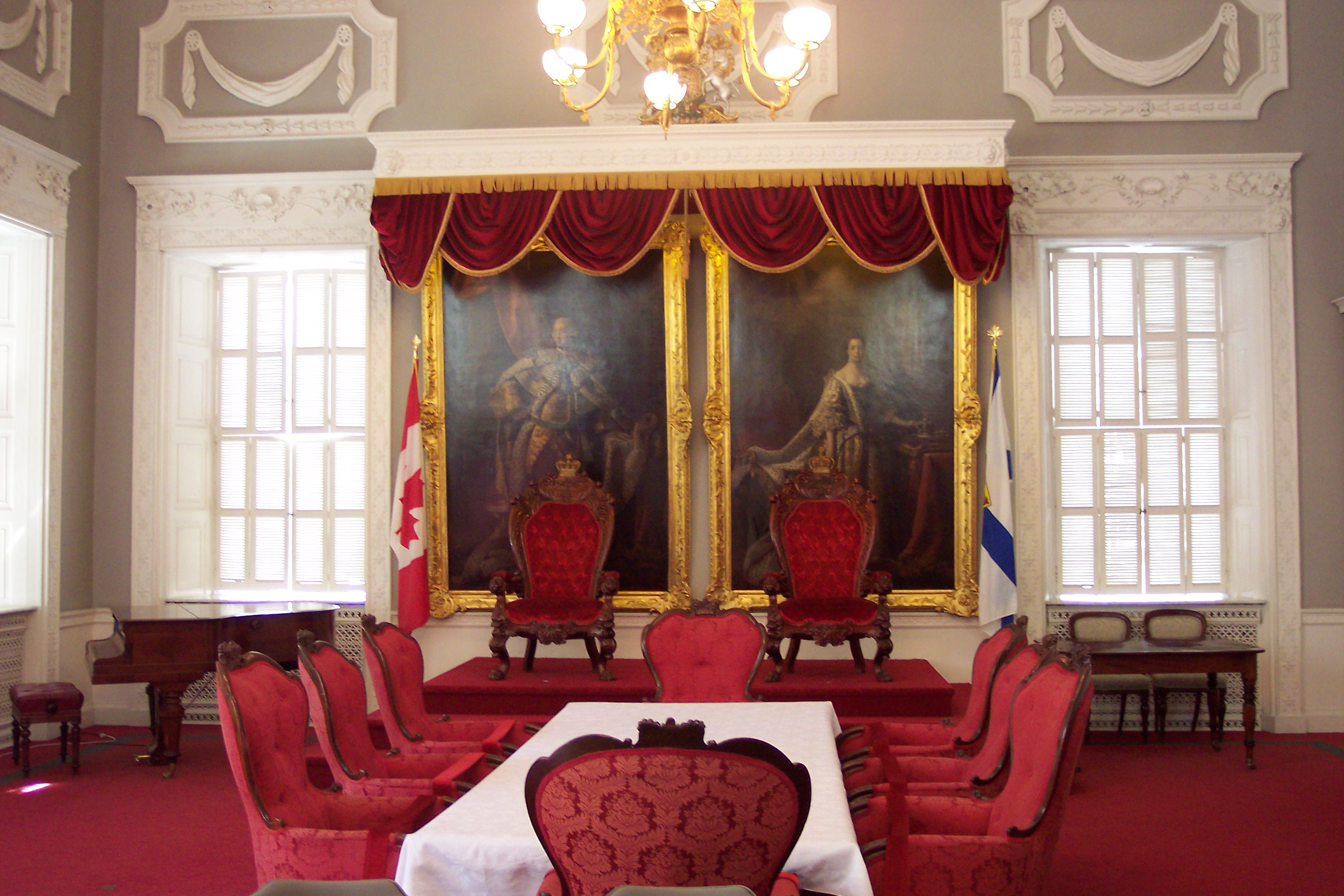
The table first used by Edward Cornwallis and the Nova Scotia Council (1749), The Red Chamber of Province House

When Cornwallis arrived in Halifax, there had already been a decades-long history of the Mi'kmaq participating in raids on British settlements in present-day Maine, often allied with French colonists in continuing national tensions. Both sides took captives, sometimes for ransom or adoption by First Nations. (See the Northeast Coast Campaigns 1688, 1703, 1723, 1724, 1745, 1746, 1747). During this time period, various British governors had issued proclamations against the Mi'kmaq for their participation in the raids. One of Cornwallis's first priorities was to renew early treaties with the Mi'kmaq and other indigenous tribes in the region. He met with chiefs of the Maliseet, Passamaquoddy and Mi'kmaq (Mi'kmaw) from Chignecto in the Summer of 1749. They agreed with the British to end fighting and renewed an earlier 1725 treaty drafted in Boston, redrafted as the Treaty of 1749. Cornwallis's efforts to have other Mi'kmaq tribes sign treaties were rejected. Most Mi'kmaq leaders in Nova Scotia remained loyal to the French King, Louis XV.

Mi'kmaq leaders met at St. Peters with French missionary Malliard in September 1749 to respond to these British actions. They composed a letter to Cornwallis making it clear that, while they tolerated the small garrison at Annapolis Royal, they completely opposed settlement at Halifax:

"The place where you are, where you are building dwellings, where you are now building a fort, where you want, as it were, to enthrone yourself, this land of which you want to make yourself absolute master, this land belongs to me".

Mi'kmaq leaders regarded the Halifax settlement as "a great theft that you have perpetrated against me."

Cornwallis sought to project British military power throughout Nova Scotia by establishing forts in the largest Acadian communities, at Pisiguit (Windsor) (Fort Edward), Grand Pré (Fort Vieux Logis), and Chignecto (Fort Lawrence). The French erected forts at present- day Saint John, Chignecto (Fort Beauséjour), and Port Elgin, New Brunswick. The fighting started when Acadians and Mi'kmaq responded by attacking the British at Chignecto, Canso and Dartmouth.

To stop the raids on the British settlements and pressure the natives into submission, Cornwallis announced an extirpation proclamation to remove the Mi'kmaq from peninsular Nova Scotia. As part of the proclamation, he offered a bounty for the capture or scalps of Mi'kmaw men. Later instructions offered a bounty for the capture of women and children: the bounty promised a reward for "every Indian you shall destroy (upon producing his Scalp as the Custom is) or every Indian taken [prisoner], Man, Woman or Child." (Note: For some contemporary commentators, the original proclamation's reference to the bounty applying to "every Indian" created confusion over whether or not the bounty targeted only Mi'kmaw men or all Mi'kmaw people. Cornwallis's later instructions to Cobb clarifies that the initial bounty was offered only for Mi'kmaw males and the instructions added a reward for taking Mi'kmaw women and children as captives.) Despite the bounty, the British forces and settlers had virtually no encounters with the Mi'kmaq and their raids against the British continued. Cornwallis increased the bounty dramatically for Mi'kmaw warriors. Settlers brought in only one scalp in the next nine months.

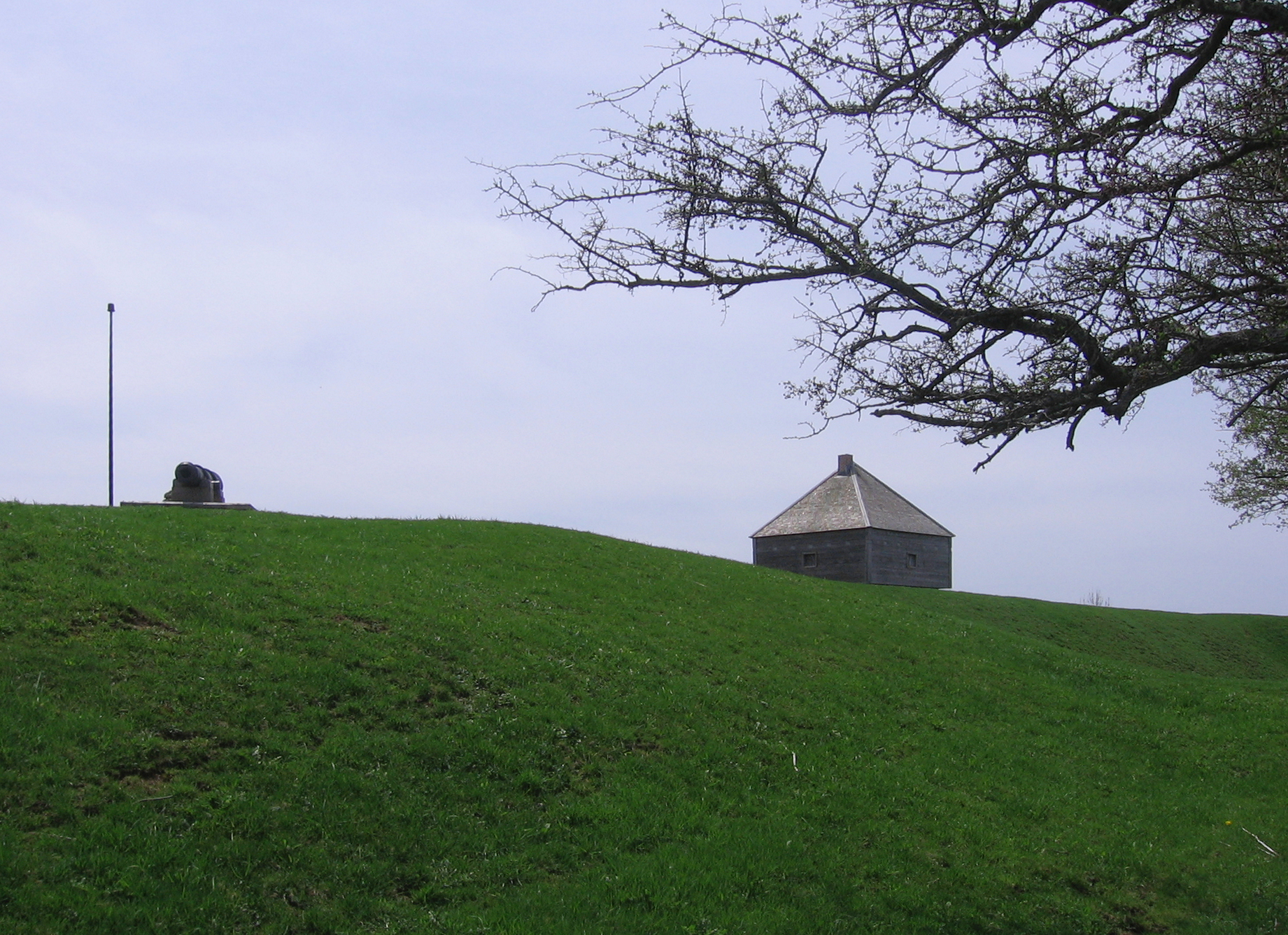
Fort Edward, named after Edward Cornwallis

In May 1751, the Mi'kmaq mounted their largest attack on British settlers with the Raid on Dartmouth. With this raid, the Mi'kmaq stopped British expansion and they stopped attacking. Cornwallis interpreted the cessation of attacks as the Mi'kmaq wanting peace. Cornwallis laid the foundation for and was at the signing of the Treaty of 1752 with Major Cope, attending at Cope's request. Having committed to being Governor only for two years, Cornwallis eventually resigned his commission and left the colony in October 1752. The treaty was ultimately rejected by most of the other Mi'kmaq leaders. Cope burned the treaty six months after he signed it.

As Governor, Cornwallis reported to the Board of Trade of Britain. The Board repeatedly expressed concern to Cornwallis for overspending: over the amount of bread delivered, the cost of arming Chignecto. In March 1751, Cornwallis was told that he would lose the confidence of parliament unless he refrained from overspending in the future. Cornwallis replied that the Board had underestimated the task of establishing Halifax under such hostile conditions and that to "flatter Your Lordships with hopes of savings" would be "dissimulation of the worst kind."

== Seven Years' War ==
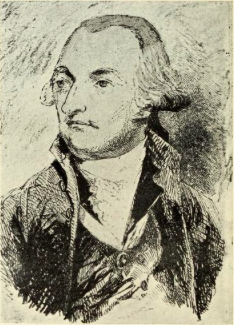
Edward Cornwallis, etching of John Giles Eccardt portrait

In November 1756 Cornwallis was one of three colonels who were ordered to proceed to Gibraltar and from there embark for Menorca, which was then under siege from the French. Admiral John Byng called a council of war, which involved Cornwallis, and advised the return of the fleet to Gibraltar leaving the garrison at Menorca to its fate. Byng, Cornwallis and the other officers were arrested when they returned to England. A large, unruly mob attacked the officers as they left their ships in Portsmouth and later burned effigies of Cornwallis and the other officers.

The officers faced court martial on "suspicion of disobedience of orders and neglect of duty." Byng was found guilty and executed. Cornwallis testified that he had not disobeyed orders, but that it was "impracticable" to land at Menorca due to stiff French defences. Further, he said he was following Byng's command. "I looked upon myself as under the command of the admiral and should have thought it my duty to have obeyed him", he testified.

Cornwallis was also one of the senior officers in the September 1757 Raid on Rochefort which saw a failed amphibious descent on the French coastline. The vast force massed on the Isle of Wight before sailing for Rochefort. The fleet stopped at Île D'Aix and examined the French defences. General Sir John Mordaunt, head of the land forces, decided the defences were too strong to attack. He called a council of war. Cornwallis voted to retreat, while Admiral Edward Hawke, head of the naval forces, and James Wolfe, quartermaster general, voted to attack. Mordaunt and Cornwallis carried the day and the mission was abandoned.

Mordaunt was arrested and faced court martial. Cornwallis testified that an attempted landing at Rochefort would have been "dangerous, almost impracticable and madness."

== Governor of Gibraltar ==
Cornwallis served as the governor of Gibraltar from 14 June 1761 to January 1776 when he died at the age of 63. His body was returned to England and laid to rest at Culford Parish Church in Culford, near Bury St. Edmunds on 9 February 1776. Both of his family titles are now extinct. In 1899, MacDonald wrote, "His name is fast coming under the category of 'Britain's forgotten worthies'."

== Personal life ==
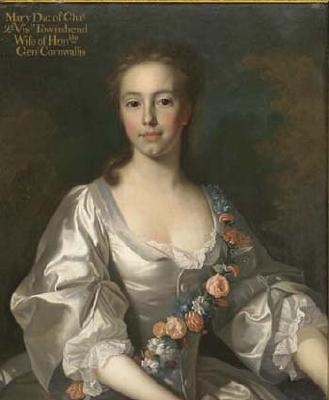
Edward Cornwallis's wife, Mary Townshend

In 1763, Cornwallis married Mary Townshend (d. 29 December 1776), daughter of Charles Townshend, 2nd Viscount Townshend, and Dorothy Townshend (Walpole), the sister of Robert Walpole. His marriage to Mary did not produce any children. His brother, Charles Cornwallis, 1st Earl Cornwallis, married Mary's half sister, Elizabeth, daughter of Charles and his first wife, Elizabeth Pelham. Through his brother's marriage, he became uncle of Charles Cornwallis, 1st Marquess Cornwallis.

== Commemorations and controversies in Nova Scotia ==
Several buildings, (Canadian Forces Base Cornwallis, a former Canadian Forces Base located in Deep Brook, Nova Scotia) places (Cornwallis Street in Halifax, Cornwallis Street in Shelburne, Cornwallis Street in Lunenburg, the Cornwallis River, and the village of Cornwallis Park), and landmarks have been named after Cornwallis. A number of ships were named after Cornwallis, including the 1944 harbour ferry Governor Cornwallis and the Canadian Coast Guard Ship Edward Cornwallis.

These commemorations of Cornwallis have become controversial in Nova Scotia. Cornwallis Junior High School was renamed Halifax Central Junior High in January 2012, In 2018, the Cornwallis Street Baptist Church changed its name to New Horizons Baptist Church to disassociate itself from Cornwallis. In 2023, Cornwallis Street in Halifax was renamed Nora Bernard Street.

The statue became the site of several Mi'kmaw protests in 2017 and the city established a committee to determine how to deal with the issue. Disturbed by lack of progress, in January 2018 the Assembly of Mi'kmaq Chiefs called for immediate removal of the statue. The Cornwallis statue was covered with a tarpaulin, then removed by order of Halifax Regional Council on 30 January 2018 and placed into storage. Council worked with Mi'kmaw Chiefs to establish a task force to examine the commemoration of Cornwallis and the final disposition of the statue, as well as how best to commemorate Indigenous history in the Halifax Regional Municipality.

On 28 January 2019, Temma Frecker, a Nova Scotia teacher at The Booker School, was awarded the Governor General's History Award for her class's proposal to return the statue to Cornwallis Park as part of a larger commemoration of regional ethnic groups. They suggested that the Cornwallis statue be installed among three other statues: Acadian Noël Doiron; Viola Desmond, a civil rights activist and Black Nova Scotian; and Mi'kmaw Chief John Denny Jr. The four statutes would be positioned as if in a conversation with each other, discussing their accomplishments and struggles.

The Canadian Coast Guard vessel CCGS Edward Cornwallis was renamed CCGS Kopit Hopson 1752 in honour of Mi'kmaq Chief Jean-Baptiste Cope and governor of Nova Scotia Peregrine Hopson.

In September 2018, a petition was started by a Halifax resident requesting Cornwallis Street in North End, Halifax, be renamed to honour the prominent human rights advocate Rocky Jones. The petition was signed by over 1,700 people, and presented to Halifax City Council by the area's City Councillor. The petition to name the street after Jones was again presented to Halifax Regional Council in October 2021, with 9,330 signatures. Council decided to rename the street and invited submission by the general public. A task force struck by Council has recommended naming the street New Horizons Street after the New Horizons Baptist Church. A short list of suggestions from submissions by the general public was gathered and a further poll was held to select a final name. "Nora Bernard Street", named after the late Mi'kmaq activist Nora Bernard, topped the public poll. In December 2022, Halifax council voted in favour of the new name, which took effect in October 2023.

In 2021, Cornwallis Park in Halifax was renamed "Peace and Friendship Park" by the Regional Municipality of Halifax.

Bridgewater renamed Cornwallis Street to Crescent Street in 2022. The town of Kentville renamed its Cornwallis Street to Bridge Street in September 2023. Lunenburg is another municipality that is committed to renaming its Cornwallis Street. The town approved a change to Queen Street in December 2023, but is reconsidering that choice to provide for public input over a possible Mi'kmaw name.

In June 2025, the village of Cornwallis Square, Nova Scotia, announced that it is planning to rename itself, dropping "Cornwallis".

== See also ==
- Military history of Nova Scotia
- Military history of the Mi'kmaq people
- Military history of the Acadians
- Groom of the Chamber

== Notes ==
Parliament of Great Britain
| Preceded by Stephen Cornwallis; John Cornwallis | Member of Parliament for Eye; 1743–1749; With: John Cornwallis 1743–1747; Roger Townshend 1747–1748; Nicholas Hardinge 1748–1749 | Succeeded by Nicholas Hardinge; Courthorpe Clayton |
| Preceded by Viscount Trentham; Sir Peter Warren | Member of Parliament for Westminster; 1753–1762; With: Viscount Trentham 1753–1754; Sir John Crosse 1754–1761; Viscount Pulteney 1761–1762 | Succeeded by Viscount Pulteney; Hon. Edwin Sandys |
Military offices
| Preceded by Richard Philipps | Colonel of the 40th Regiment of Foot; 1750–1752 | Succeeded by Peregrine Hopson |
| Preceded by The Marquess of Lothian | Colonel of the 24th Regiment of Foot; 1752–1776 | Succeeded by William Taylor |
Political offices
| Preceded by Richard Philipps | Governor of Nova Scotia; 1749–1752 | Succeeded by Peregrine Hopson |
| Preceded by The Earl of Home | Governor of Gibraltar; 1761–1776 | Succeeded by Sir John Irwin |
