= Nicholas Hardinge =

English civil servant, Member of Parliament and Neo-Latin poet

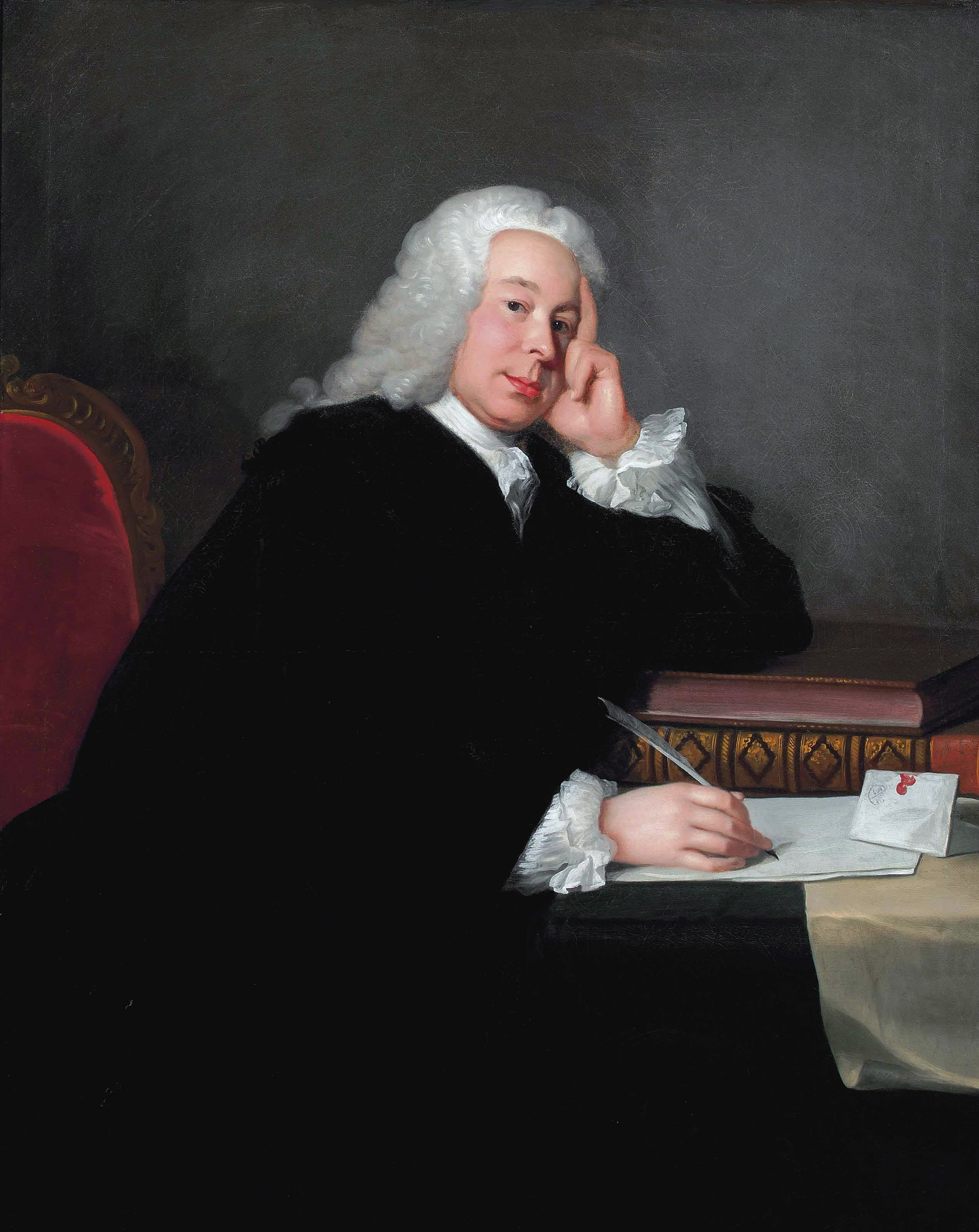
Nicholas Hardinge, M.P. (1699-1758) (circle of Allan Ramsay)

Nicholas Hardinge (1699–1758) was an English civil servant, clerk to the House of Commons from 1731 to 1752 and then Secretary to the Treasury, and a Member of Parliament known also as a Neo-Latin poet.

== Life ==
He was the elder son of Gideon Hardinge (died 1712), vicar of Kingston upon Thames, and born at Kingston on 7 February 1699. He was educated at Eton College, and then from 1718 at King's College, Cambridge. He proceeded B.A. in 1722, M.A. in 1726, and became a Fellow of his college. During Hardinge's time at Cambridge a dispute arose over the expulsion of a student for political reflections directed against the Tories in a college exercise. An appeal was made to the Bishop of Lincoln, and, on his deciding against the authorities, litigation ensued. Hardinge's legal studies began with an investigation of the visitatorial power in connection with this quarrel, but his essay on the subject was never published.

He entered the Middle Temple in 1721, and on leaving Cambridge he was called to the bar. He accepted the post of chief clerk to the House of Commons in 1731, and held it till April 1752, when he sold the post to Jeremiah Dyson for £6,000, and was appointed joint secretary of the treasury. Hardinge drew up a report of the condition in which he found the journals of the House, and put them into form, incorporating his own report.

Hardinge became possessed of Canbury Manor in Kingston-upon-Thames after the death of a similarly named cousin. He was chosen as Member of Parliament for Eye, Suffolk, in 1748 and 1754.

He died on 9 April 1758.

== Works ==
Hardinge had a reputation as a classical scholar, and it was on his advice that James "Athenian" Stuart went to Athens. All his life he wrote Latin verse of merit, but no collection was published till after his death. In 1780 appeared ‘Poemata auctore Nicolao Hardinge, Col. Reg. Socio,’ London, (some copies bear the title ‘Latin Verses by the late Nicolas Hardinge, esq.’). This collection from what he wrote in Latin, was edited by his eldest son, who had in preparation at the time of his death a collection of his father's English verses and other writings, and began a life in Latin to be prefixed to the volume. These materials were all incorporated in a volume seen through the press by J. Nichols. English and Latin poems appeared during the author's lifetime in different publications.

The Essay on the Regency was written at the instance of Prince William, Duke of Cumberland, to whom Hardinge was a salaried law reader from 1732; he was afterwards the duke's attorney-general.

== Family ==
He married, 19 December 1738, Jane, daughter of Sir John Pratt, by whom he had nine sons and three daughters. His eldest surviving son was George Hardinge; Henry was father of George Nicholas Hardinge and Henry Hardinge, 1st Viscount Hardinge; while Richard (1756–1801) was created a baronet in 1801, with remainder to the heirs male of his father, and was succeeded by the Rev. Charles Hardinge, eldest son of his brother Henry.
