= HMS Cornwallis =

Five or six ships of the Royal Navy have been named HMS Cornwallis, after Admiral Sir William Cornwallis.

- HMS Cornwallis (1777) was a 5-gun galley purchased in North America in 1777 and sold in 1782.
- HMS Cornwallis (1781) was a 14-gun storeship purchased in 1781, that foundered in 1782 in the Atlantic.
- HMS Cornwallis was an 18-gun brig that did not enter into Admiralty records. A few passing mentions in other contexts are the sole indicators of her existence. She appears to have been purchased at the Cape of Good Hope. Lieutenant Richard Byron was appointed to command her in March 1798 and to Commander on 22 June. He sailed her "with dispatches" to Britain, where she was paid off and seemingly never returned to service.
- HMS Cornwallis (1805) was a 54-gun fourth rate ship of the line, formerly the East Indiaman Marquis Cornwallis, launched in 1801 and purchased in 1805. She was renamed HMS Akbar in 1811 and used as a troopship. In 1824 she was used for harbour service, and was finally sold in 1862.
- HMS Cornwallis (1813) was a 74-gun third rate launched in 1813. She was converted to a screw propelled ship in 1855 and rearmed to 60 guns. She became a jetty in 1865, was renamed HMS Wildfire in 1916 and was broken up in 1957.
- HMS Cornwallis (1901) was a Duncan-class battleship launched in 1901 and sunk in 1917 by a German U-boat.

Battle honours

- Amboina 1810
- China 1842
- Baltic 1855
- Dardanelles 1915

== See also ==
- HMS Lychnis was an Anchusa-class sloop renamed HMIS Cornwallis on her transferral to the Royal Indian Marine in 1921.
- HMCS Cornwallis, the Royal Canadian Navy recruit training establishment from 1942 to 1968 before being renamed CFB Cornwallis.
