= Cornwallis (1787 ship) =

History

Great Britain
- Name: Cornwallis
- Namesake: Charles Cornwallis, 1st Marquess Cornwallis
- Owner: British East India Company (EIC)
- Operator: Bengal Pilot Service
- Builder: Bombay Dockyard
- Launched: 1787
- Captured: 10, or 19 December 1796

General characteristics
- Tons burthen: 170 (bm)
- Sail plan: Snow, or brig, or sloop
- Armament: 14 guns

Cornwallis was a snow that the Honourable East India Company (EIC) had built in 1787 at Bombay Dockyard for the Bengal Pilot Service. A French privateer captured her in 1796.

== Career ==
On 12 November 1792, Cornwallis left Calcutta for the Andaman Islands, together with the EIC's vessels Juno, Union, and Seahorse, all under the command of Captain Archibald Blair, in Union. They were carrying some 360 settlers and supplies for six months to establish a settlement on North Andaman Island. A gale dispersed the vessels, but all arrived, with Cornwallis, the last to arrive on 14 December. Cornwallis was under the command of Captain C. Crawley, who on 27 December wrote a letter to Blair reporting on a mutinous attitude among the European members of his crew. At the end of December Crawley was relieved of duty and replaced by Lieutenant Wales, of the Bombay Marine, who was then in command of the Ranger. At the same time Cornwallis was removed from the Pilot Service and transferred to the Andaman Station.

On 23 March 1793 Cornwallis arrived at Port Cornwallis with a detachment of sepoys. Major A. Kyd, the superintendent for the Andamans, then dispatched her for Achoon (Aceh) and the coast of Pedeir (or Pedir; the north part of the coast of Sumatra), to purchase rice and livestock. On her return she was to sail to the Carnicobars to gather coconuts for planting.

== Fate ==
A French privateer captured Cornwallis on 10 December 1796, or 19 December, at Balasore Roads. Cornwallis was under the command of Mr. Atkins. Her captor was Esperse, of 22 guns, Captain Le Dane. There is no record in available online resources of any vessel named Esperse, or any corsair captain named Le Dane. However, a French source reports that Cornwallis arrived at Mauritius on 25 January 1797. It further reported that she was a prize to Enterprise, Captain Leblond. (Note: Enterprise was the former Jean Bart, a corvette of 500 tons (French; "of load"), 20 guns, and about 180 men. She was commissioned in August 1794 and renamed Entreprise circa 1795. She was under François Legars. Two of Legar's prizes had come into Mauritius ahead of Cornwallis, and Enterprise returned on 9 February. LeDane or LeBlond may have been the name of the captain of the prize crew on Cornwallis, represent transcription errors, or at least in one case be a nickname.)
