= Fiennes Cornwallis =

British Army officer

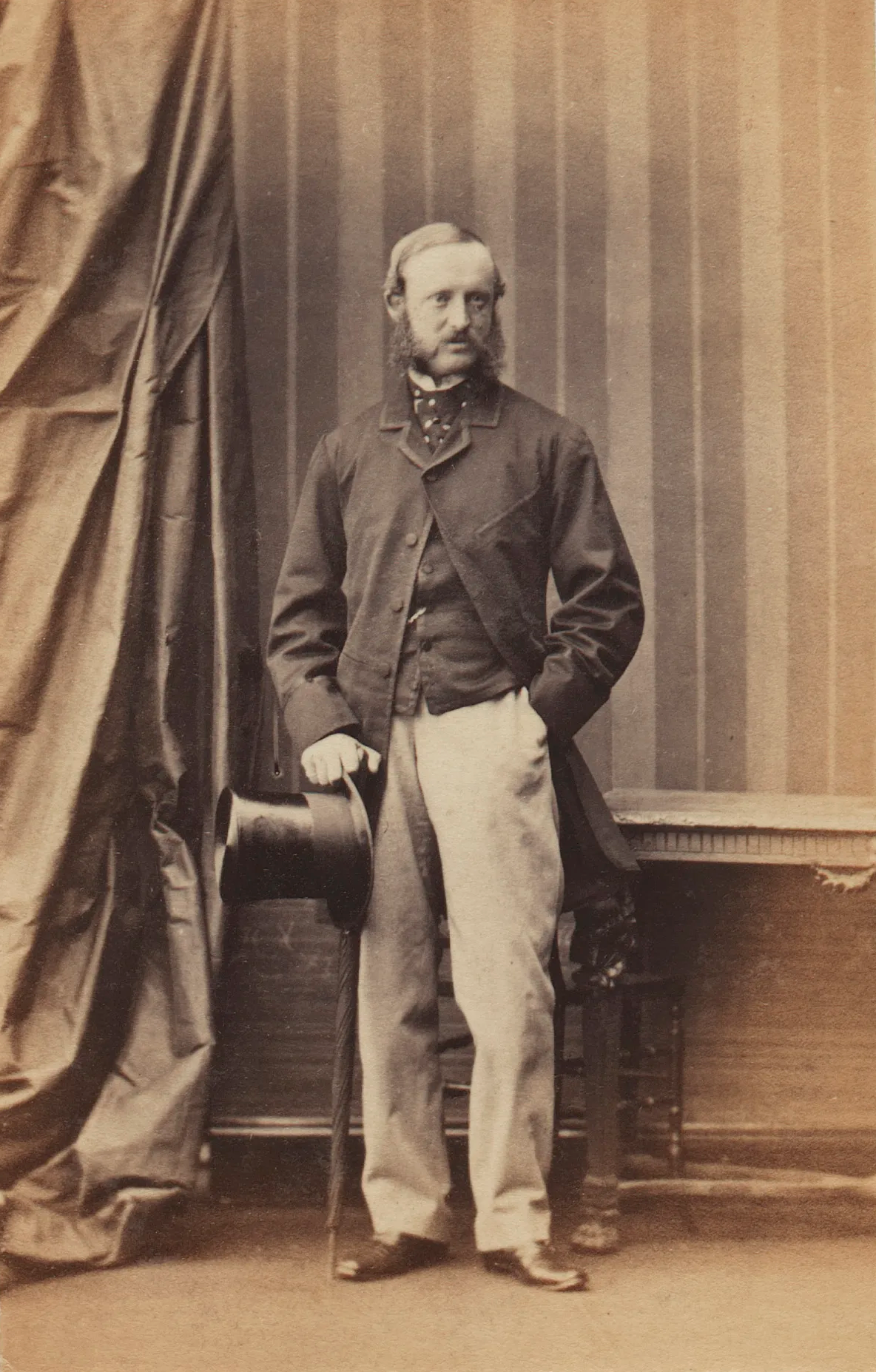
- Portrait by Camille Silvy, 1861
- Born: Fiennes Wykeham-Martin; 1 November 1831; Leeds Castle, Kent, England
- Died: 24 April 1867 (aged 35); Banbury, Oxfordshire, England
- Education: Eton College
- Occupation: Soldier
- Employer: British Army
- Spouse: Harriet Elizabeth (née Mott)
- Children: 4
- Parent(s): Charles Wykeham Martin and Lady Jemima Isabella
- Relatives: James Mann, 5th Earl Cornwallis

Major Fiennes Cornwallis, born Fiennes Wykeham-Martin (1 November 1831 – 24 April 1867), was a British Army officer and related to the Cornwallis family.

== Early life ==
Born 1 November 1831 at Leeds Castle, Kent, England, he was the son of Charles Wykeham Martin M.P. and Lady Jemima Isabella (née Mann) and was educated at Eton College.

== Family life ==
Major Cornwallis, married Harriet Elizabeth (née Mott), daughter of John Thomas Mott on 29 July 1863 and had 4 children. The eldest became 1st Baron Cornwallis.

Cornwallis was the grandson of James Mann, 5th Earl Cornwallis; the great-grandson of James Cornwallis, 4th Earl Cornwallis; the 2nd great-grandson of Charles Cornwallis, 1st Earl Cornwallis; the 3rd great-grandson of Charles Cornwallis, 4th Baron Cornwallis; the 4th great-grandson of Charles Cornwallis, 3rd Baron Cornwallis; the 5th great-grandson of Charles Cornwallis, 2nd Baron Cornwallis; the 6th great-grandson of Frederick Cornwallis, 1st Baron Cornwallis; and the 7th great-grandson of Jane Cornwallis, and Elizabeth Richardson, 1st Lady Cramond. His other ancestors include Edward Cornwallis, Frederick Cornwallis, Charles Cornwallis, 1st Marquess Cornwallis, William Cornwallis, and Charles Cornwallis, 2nd Marquess Cornwallis.

== Military career ==
Cornwallis served in the Crimean War with the 4th Light Dragoons and took part in the Charge of the Light Brigade, becoming aide-de-camp to Lord George Paget in the Crimea.

== Later life ==
Cornwallis retired from the Army on 5 May 1863 with the rank of Major and died few years later on 24 April 1867 in a hunting accident.

== Bibliography ==
- Kidd, Charles; Williamson, David (editors). Debrett's Peerage and Baronetage (1990 edition).
  New York: St Martin's Press, 1990. ISBN 0-333-38847-X
