= Charles Cornwallis (disambiguation) =

Charles Cornwallis, 1st Marquess Cornwallis (1738–1805) was a British Army officer and colonial administrator.

Charles Cornwallis may also refer to:

- Sir Charles Cornwallis (diplomat) (died 1629), English courtier and diplomat
- Charles Cornwallis, 2nd Baron Cornwallis (1632–1673), English landowner and politician
- Charles Cornwallis, 3rd Baron Cornwallis (1655–1698), British politician
- Charles Cornwallis, 4th Baron Cornwallis (1675–1721/22), British politician
- Charles Cornwallis, 1st Earl Cornwallis (1700–1762), British peer
- Charles Cornwallis, 2nd Marquess Cornwallis (1774–1823), British Tory politician
- Charles Cornwallis (d. 1675) (c. 1619–1675), one of the two MPs for Eye between 1662 and 1675
