= Charles Cornwallis, 1st Earl Cornwallis =

British peer

The Right Honourable The Earl Cornwallis PC
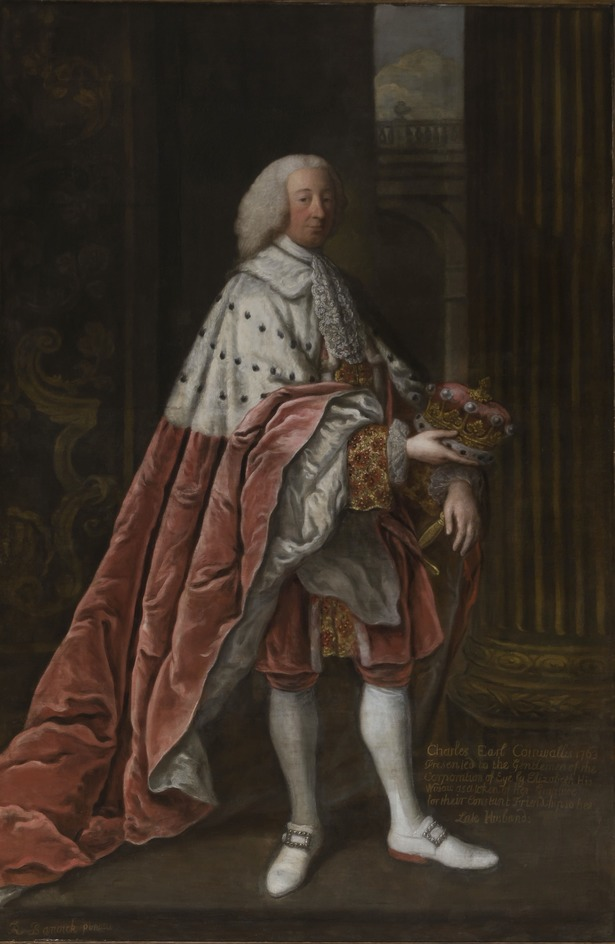
- painting by Allan Ramsay

Lord-Lieutenant of the Tower Hamlets and Constable of the Tower of London
- In office 1740–1762
- Monarchs: George II; George III
- Preceded by: Vacant
- Succeeded by: The Lord Berkeley of Stratton

Personal details
- Born: 29 March 1700
- Died: 23 June 1762 (aged 62)
- Spouse: Hon. Elizabeth Townshend (d. 1785)

Charles Cornwallis, 1st Earl Cornwallis PC (29 March 1700 – 23 June 1762), styled The Honourable Charles Cornwallis until 1722 and known as The Lord Cornwallis between 1722 and 1753, was a British peer.

== Background ==
Cornwallis was the son of Charles Cornwallis, 4th Baron Cornwallis, by Lady Charlotte, daughter of Richard Butler, 1st Earl of Arran. Edward Cornwallis and Frederick Cornwallis were his younger brothers. He was admitted to Clare College, Cambridge in 1717.

== Career ==
On 14 August 1721, Cornwallis was appointed a groom of the Bedchamber by King George I.

Cornwallis succeeded his father in the barony in 1722. In 1740 he was sworn of the Privy Council and appointed Lord-Lieutenant of the Tower Hamlets and Constable of the Tower of London, posts he held until 1762. In 1753 he was created Viscount Brome, in the County of Suffolk, and Earl Cornwallis.

== Family ==
Lord Cornwallis married the Honourable Elizabeth, daughter of Charles Townshend, 2nd Viscount Townshend, in 1722. They had nine children:

- Lady Elizabeth Cornwallis (1 September 1723 - 20 March 1796), married Bowen Southwell on 3 July 1753
- Lady Louisa Cornwallis (4 October 1724 - bur. 4 January 1725)
- Lady Charlotte Cornwallis (1 June 1726 - 11 March 1794), married 8 April 1756 Bishop Spencer Madan and had issue.
- Lady Lucy Cornwallis (bap. 13 October 1727 - bur. 13 October 1727)
- Lady Mary Cornwallis (6 June 1736 – 28 December 1770), married on 13 August 1769 Samuel Whitbread and had issue.
- Gen. Charles Cornwallis, 1st Marquess Cornwallis (31 December 1738 – 5 October 1805)
- Capt. Hon. Henry Cornwallis (10 September 1740 – 1761)
- Bishop James Cornwallis, 4th Earl Cornwallis (25 February 1743 – 20 January 1824)
- Adm. Sir William Cornwallis, RN (20 February 1744 – 5 July 1819)

Cornwallis died on 23 June 1762, aged 62, at Hot Wells, Clifton, Bristol. He was buried at St Mary's church at Culford Hall, Suffolk on 26 June 1762. He was succeeded by his eldest son, Charles, who became a prominent military commander and was created Marquess Cornwallis in 1792. The Dowager Countess Elizabeth died on 1 December 1785 and was also buried at Culford.

He was the grandson of Charles Cornwallis, 3rd Baron Cornwallis; the great-grandson of Charles Cornwallis, 2nd Baron Cornwallis; and the great-great-grandson of Frederick Cornwallis, 1st Baron Cornwallis.

He was the grandfather of Charles Cornwallis; the great-grandfather of James Mann; the 2nd great-grandfather of Fiennes Cornwallis; the 3rd great-grandfather of Fiennes Cornwallis, 1st Baron Cornwallis; the 4th great-grandfather of Wykeham Cornwallis, 2nd Baron Cornwallis; and the 5th great-grandfather of Fiennes Cornwallis, 3rd Baron Cornwallis.

== Ancestry ==
Ancestors of Charles Cornwallis, 1st Earl Cornwallis

8. Charles Cornwallis, 2nd Baron Cornwallis
4. Charles Cornwallis, 3rd Baron Cornwallis
9. Margaret Playsted
2. Charles Cornwallis, 4th Baron Cornwallis
10. Stephen Fox
5. Elizabeth Fox
11. Elizabeth Whittle
1. Charles Cornwallis, 1st Earl Cornwallis
12. James Butler, 1st Duke of Ormond
6. Richard Butler, Earl of Arran
13. Elizabeth Preston
3. Lady Charlotte Butler
14. John Ferrers
7. Dorothy Ferrers
15. Anne Carleton

Legal offices
| Preceded by The Earl of Tankerville | Justice in Eyre; South of the Trent; 1722–1740 | Succeeded by The Earl of Jersey |
Honorary titles
| Vacant Title last held by The Earl of Leicester | Lord-Lieutenant of the Tower Hamlets; 1740 – 1762 | Succeeded by The Lord Berkeley of Stratton |
| Vacant Title last held by The Earl of Leicester | Constable of the Tower of London; 1740 – 1762 | Succeeded by The Lord Berkeley of Stratton |
Peerage of Great Britain
| New creation | Earl Cornwallis; 1753–1762 | Succeeded by Charles Cornwallis |
Peerage of England
| Preceded by Charles Cornwallis | Baron Cornwallis; 1722–1762 | Succeeded by Charles Cornwallis |
