= Earl Cornwallis =

Earldom in the Peerage of Great Britain

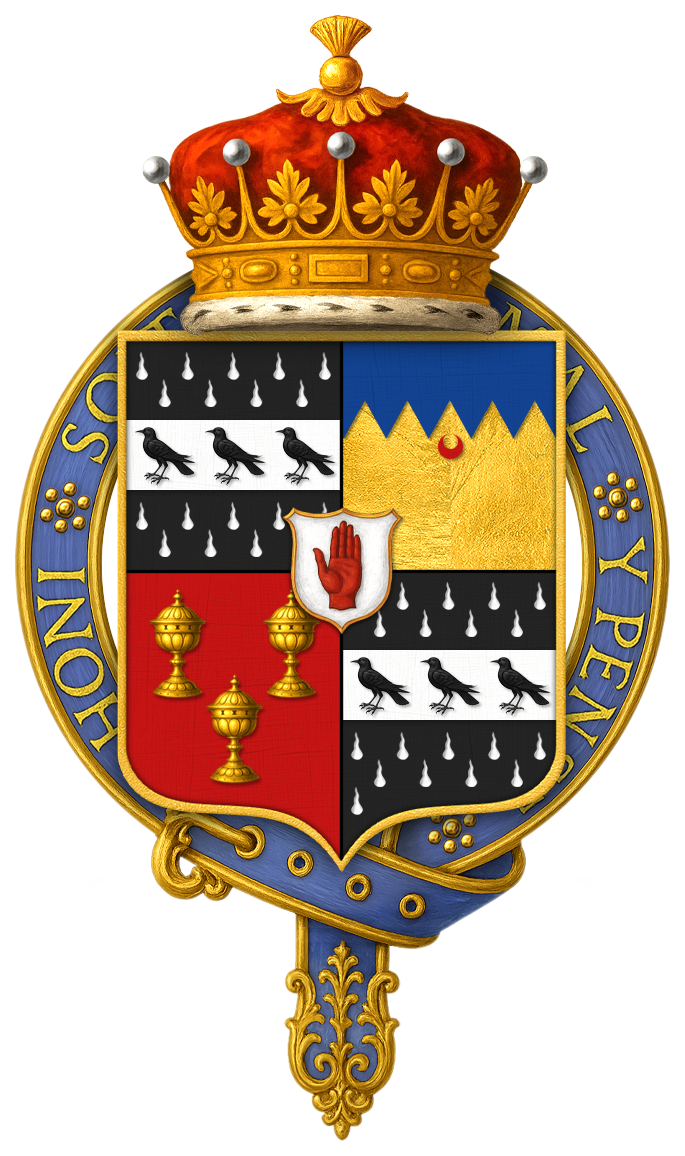
Quartered arms of Charles Cornwallis, as 2nd Earl Cornwallis, KG. Cornwallis was created Marquess Cornwallis in 1792.

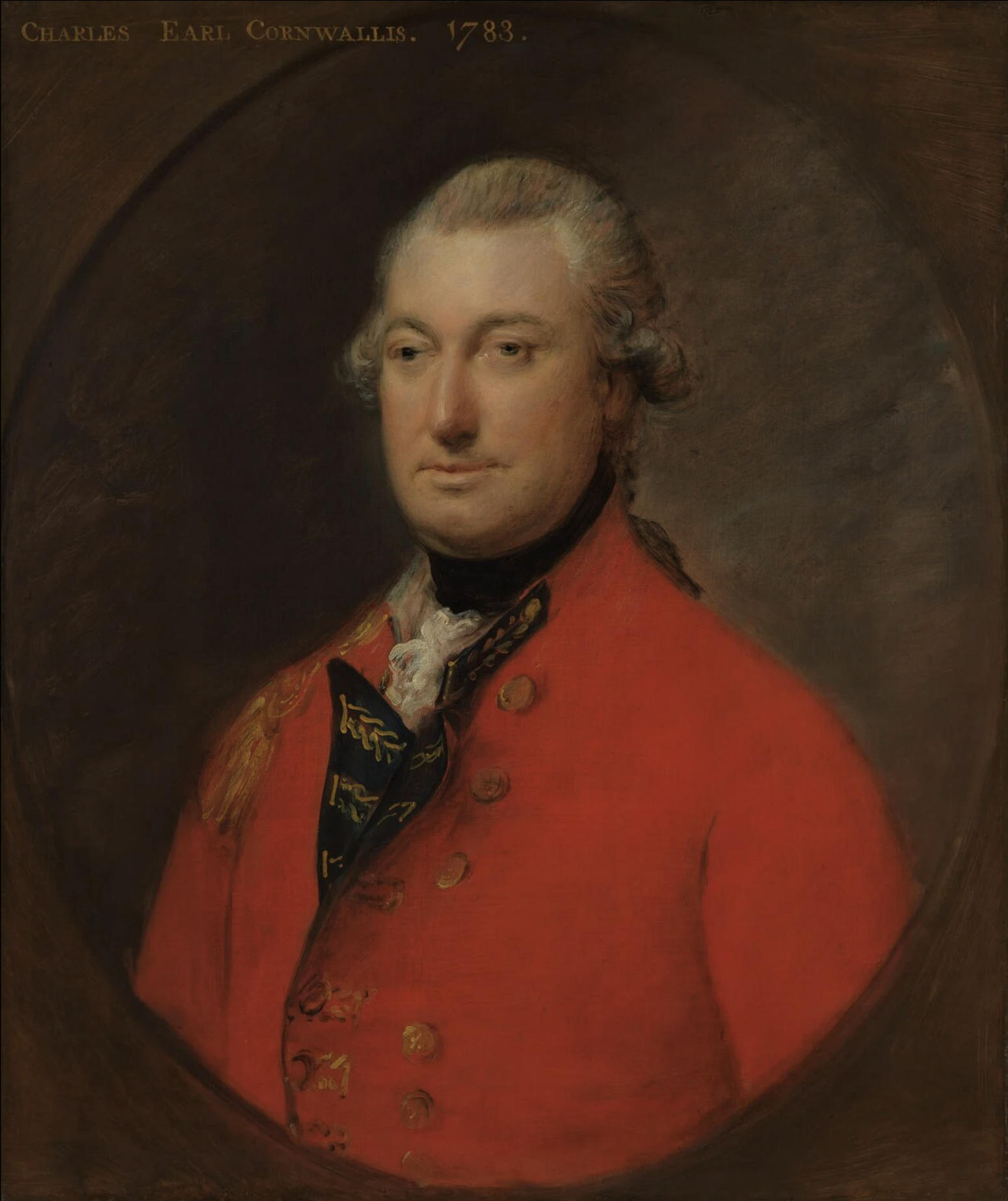
Charles Cornwallis, 1st Marquess Cornwallis

Earl Cornwallis was a title in the Peerage of Great Britain created in 1753 for Charles Cornwallis, 5th Baron Cornwallis. The second Earl was created Marquess Cornwallis but this title became extinct upon the death of the second marquessate in 1823, while the earldom and its subsidiary titles became extinct in 1852 (the barony was recreated in the 20th century).

The Cornwallis family descended from Frederick Cornwallis, who represented Eye and Ipswich in the House of Commons. He was created a Baronet in the Baronetage of England in 1627 and Baron Cornwallis, of Eye in the County of Suffolk, in the Peerage of England in 1661. He was succeeded by his son, the second Baron, who also sat as Member of Parliament for Eye. On his death, the titles passed to his son, the third Baron. He notably served as First Lord of the Admiralty. His son, the fourth Baron, was Lord Lieutenant of Suffolk and Postmaster General.

He was succeeded by his son, the fifth Baron. In 1753, he was created Viscount Brome, in the County of Suffolk, and Earl Cornwallis in the Peerage of Great Britain. His son, the second Earl, was a noted military commander, best known as one of the leading British generals in the American War of Independence; his surrender at Yorktown ended the war. He subsequently served as Commander-in-Chief of India. In 1792 he was created Marquess Cornwallis in the Peerage of Great Britain. He was succeeded by his son, the second Marquess. He represented Eye (which by this time was considered a pocket borough of the Cornwallis family) and Suffolk in Parliament. Lord Cornwallis had four daughters but no sons, and the marquessate became extinct on his death in 1823. He was succeeded in the other titles by his uncle, the fourth Earl. He was Bishop of Lichfield and Coventry from 1781 to 1824. He married Catherine, daughter of Galfridus Mann of Boughton Malherbe in Kent. He was succeeded by his son, the fifth Earl. He sat as Member of Parliament for Eye. In 1814, Lord Cornwallis assumed by Royal licence his maternal grandfather's surname of Mann. He had no surviving male issue and the earldom, viscountcy, barony and baronetcy became extinct on his death in 1852. His daughter Lady Jemima Isabella married Charles Wykeham-Martin.

Their son Fiennes Wykeham-Martin assumed by Royal licence the surname of Cornwallis in 1859. In 1927, the Cornwallis title was revived when his son Fiennes Cornwallis was raised to the peerage as Baron Cornwallis, of Linton, in the County of Kent.

Several other members of the Cornwallis family also gained distinction. The Hon. Edward Cornwallis, the sixth son of the fourth Baron, was a soldier and is known as the founder of Halifax. His younger twin brother, the Right Reverend the Hon. Frederick Cornwallis, was Archbishop of Canterbury. The Hon. William Cornwallis, younger son of the first Earl and younger brother of the first Marquess, was an admiral in the Royal Navy.

== Barons Cornwallis (1661) ==
- Frederick Cornwallis, 1st Baron Cornwallis (1610–1662)
- Charles Cornwallis, 2nd Baron Cornwallis (1632–1673)
- Charles Cornwallis, 3rd Baron Cornwallis (1655–1698)
- Charles Cornwallis, 4th Baron Cornwallis (1675–1722)
- Charles Cornwallis, 5th Baron Cornwallis (1700–1762) (created Earl Cornwallis in 1753)

== Earls Cornwallis (1753) ==
- Charles Cornwallis, 1st Earl Cornwallis (1700–1762)
- Charles Cornwallis, 2nd Earl Cornwallis (1738–1805) (created Marquess Cornwallis in 1792)

== Marquesses Cornwallis (1792) ==
- Charles Cornwallis, 1st Marquess Cornwallis (1738–1805)
- Charles Cornwallis, 2nd Marquess Cornwallis (1774–1823)

== Earls Cornwallis (1753, reverted) ==
- James Cornwallis, 4th Earl Cornwallis (1743–1824)
- James Mann, 5th Earl Cornwallis (1778–1852)
  - Hon. Charles James Cornwallis later Mann, styled Viscount Brome (1813–1835), heir apparent until his death with no other heirs in remainder to the title.

== See also ==
- Baron Cornwallis (1927 creation)
