= James Cornwallis, 4th Earl Cornwallis =

British clergyman and peer

The Right Reverend and Right Honourable The Earl Cornwallis
- Bishop of Lichfield and Coventry
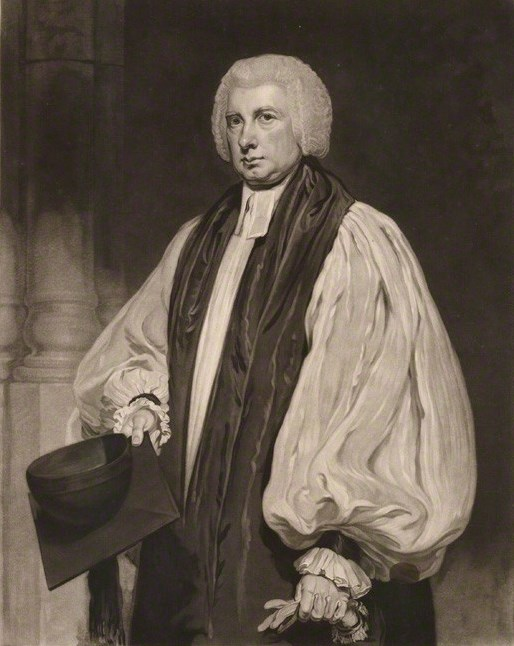
- Diocese: Diocese of Lichfield and Coventry
- In office: 1781–1824
- Predecessor: Richard Hurd
- Successor: Henry Ryder

Personal details
- Born: 25 February 1743
- Died: 20 January 1824 (aged 80)
- Denomination: Anglican
- Spouse: Catherine Mann
- Children: James Mann, 5th Earl Cornwallis
- Education: Eton College; Christ Church, Oxford

James Cornwallis, 4th Earl Cornwallis (25 February 1743 – 20 January 1824) was a British clergyman and peer.

== Life ==
He was the third son of Charles Cornwallis, 1st Earl Cornwallis and his wife, Elizabeth, daughter of the 2nd Viscount Townshend, and niece of Sir Robert Walpole. His uncle, Frederick, was Archbishop of Canterbury. Frederick's twin brother, Edward, was a military officer, colonial governor, and founder of Halifax, Nova Scotia. James's brother William was an Admiral in the Royal Navy. His other brother, Charles Cornwallis, was the general of the American Revolutionary War.

Cornwallis was educated at Eton College, proceeding in 1760 to Christ Church, Oxford. He was subsequently a Fellow of Merton College, Oxford.

He was Rector of Ickham from 1769 to 1773, of Addisham-with-Staple from 1770 to 1781, of Newington in 1770, Prebendary of Westminster Abbey from 1770 to 1785, Vicar of Wrotham from 1771 to 1785, Rector of Boughton Malherbe from 1773 to 1785 and Dean of Canterbury from 1775 to 1781. In 1774-75 he served as Master's Mate aboard HMS Pallas, which was under the command of his brother William and stationed off the west African coast.

In 1781 Cornwallis was appointed Bishop of Lichfield and Coventry and was Dean of Windsor from 1791 to 1794 and Dean of Durham from 1794 before dying in office in 1824. While he was Bishop of Lichfield and Coventry he gave permission for the construction of a new Poorhouse (Workhouse) at Eagle House, Eccleshall.

== Family ==
On 30 April 1771 Cornwallis married Catherine Mann, a sister of Sir Horatio Mann, 2nd Baronet, and they had one child, James. In 1814, he inherited Sir Horatio's estate at Linton Park. In 1823 he inherited the earldom of Cornwallis from his nephew, Charles Cornwallis, 2nd Marquess Cornwallis but held the title for less than a year, when it passed to his son.

Religious titles
Preceded by John Moore	Dean of Canterbury; 1775–1781	Succeeded by George Horne
Preceded by Richard Hurd	Bishop of Lichfield and Coventry; 1781–1824	Succeeded by Henry Ryder
Preceded by John Douglas	Dean of Windsor; 1791–1794	Succeeded by Charles Manners-Sutton
Preceded by John Hinchcliffe	Dean of Durham; 1794–1824	Succeeded by Charles Hall
Peerage of Great Britain
Preceded by Charles Cornwallis	Earl Cornwallis; 1823–1824	Succeeded by James Cornwallis
