= Charles Cornwallis, 1st Marquess Cornwallis =

British Army officer (1738–1805)

General The Most Honourable The Marquess Cornwallis KG PC
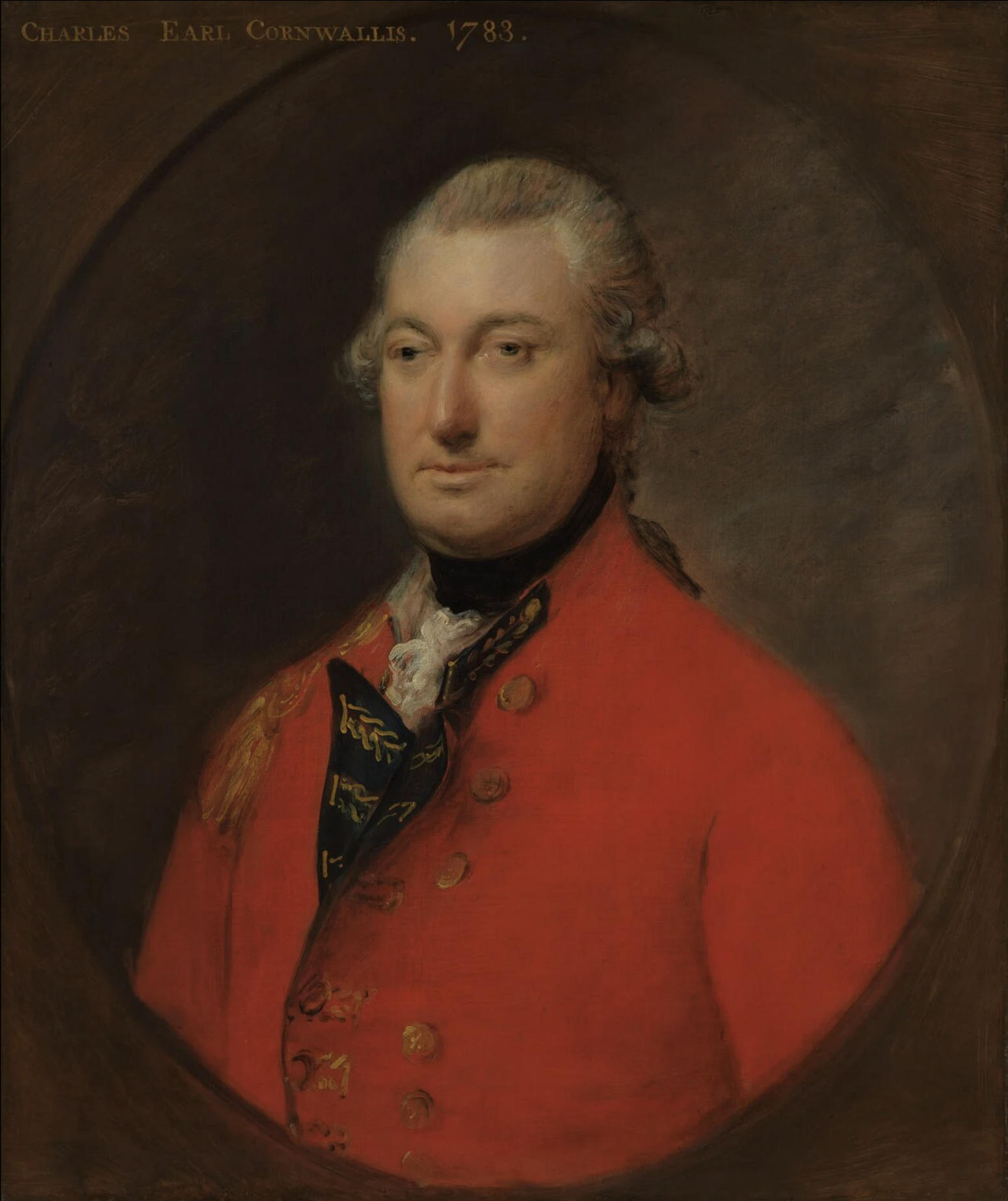
- Portrait of Lord Cornwallis by Thomas Gainsborough, 1783

Governor-General of the Presidency of Fort William
- In office 30 July 1805 – 5 October 1805
- Monarch: George III
- Prime Minister: William Pitt the Younger
- Preceded by: The Marquess Wellesley
- Succeeded by: Sir George Barlow, Bt; As Acting Governor-General
- In office 12 September 1786 – 28 October 1793
- Monarch: George III
- Prime Minister: William Pitt the Younger
- Preceded by: Sir John Macpherson, Bt; As Acting Governor-General
- Succeeded by: Sir John Shore

Lord Lieutenant of Ireland
- In office 14 June 1798 – 27 April 1801
- Monarch: George III
- Prime Minister: William Pitt the Younger
- Preceded by: The Earl Camden
- Succeeded by: The Earl Hardwicke

Member of Parliament for Eye
- In office 1760–1762 Serving with Henry Cornwallis (Note: Served from 30 March–April 1761); Henry Townshend (Note: Served from 4 December 1761 – 24 June 1762); Courthorpe Clayton (Note: Served from 1660-1660)
- Preceded by: Henry Townshend
- Succeeded by: Richard Burton

Master-General of the Ordnance
- In office 1795–1801
- Preceded by: Charles Lennox
- Succeeded by: John Pitt

Justice in Eyre South of Trent
- In office 1767–1769
- Preceded by: John Monson
- Succeeded by: Fletcher Norton

Lords and Gentlemen of the Bedchamber
- In office 1765–1765
- Preceded by: Frederick St John
- Succeeded by: Not Replaced

British Plenipotentiary to France
- In office 1801–1802
- Preceded by: George Leveson-Gower
- Succeeded by: Charles Whitworth

Commander-in-Chief, India
- In office 1789–1793
- Preceded by: Sir Robert Sloper
- Succeeded by: Sir Robert Abercromby
- In office 1805–1805
- Preceded by: Gerard Lake
- Succeeded by: Gerard Lake

Constable of the Tower Lord Lieutenant of the Tower Hamlets
- In office 1771–1784
- Preceded by: John Berkeley
- Succeeded by: Lord George Lennox
- In office 1784–1805
- Preceded by: Lord George Lennox
- Succeeded by: Francis Rawdon-Hastings

Personal details
- Born: Charles Edward Cornwallis V 31 December 1738 Mayfair, London, England
- Died: 5 October 1805 (aged 66) Gauspur, Kingdom of Kashi-Benares (present-day in Uttar Pradesh, India)
- Party: Whig
- Spouse: Jemima Tullekin Jones (m. 1768; died 1779)
- Children: Mary (28 July 1769-26 May 1857); Charles (22 October 1774-9 August 1823)
- Education: Eton College; Clare College, Cambridge
- Occupation: Military officer, official
- Awards: Knight Companion of The Most Noble Order of the Garter

Military service
- Allegiance: Great Britain (1757–1801); United Kingdom (1801–1805)
- Branch/service: British Army; Presidency armies
- Years of service: 1757–1805
- Rank: General
- Commands: India; Ireland; South-East England
- Battles/wars: Seven Years' War; Battle of Minden; Battle of Villinghausen; Battle of Wilhelmsthal; Battle of Lutterberg; Siege of Cassell; American War of Independence; Battle of Sullivan's Island; New York and New Jersey campaign; Battle of Long Island; Battle of the Assunpink Creek; Philadelphia campaign; Battle of Brandywine; Battle of Germantown; Battle of Fort Mercer; Battle of Monmouth; Siege of Charleston; Battle of Camden; Battle of Cowpens; Battle of Guildford Court House; Battle of Yorktown; Third Anglo-Mysore War; Siege of Bangalore; Battle of Arakere; Siege of Seringapatam; Irish Rebellion of 1798; Battle of Ballinamuck; Anti-invasion preparations

General Charles Cornwallis, 1st Marquess Cornwallis (31 December 1738 – 5 October 1805) was a British Army officer, Whig politician and colonial administrator. In the United States and United Kingdom, he is best known as one of the leading British general officers in the American War of Independence. His surrender in 1781 to a combined Franco-American force at the siege of Yorktown ended significant hostilities in North America. Cornwallis later served as a civil and military governor in Ireland, where he helped to bring about the Act of Union; and in India, where he helped to enact the Cornwallis Code and the Permanent Settlement.

Born into an aristocratic family and educated at Eton College and the University of Cambridge, Cornwallis joined the British Army in 1757, seeing action in the Seven Years' War. Upon his father's death in 1762 he succeeded to his peerage and entered the House of Lords. From 1766 to 1805 he was colonel of the 33rd Regiment of Foot. Cornwallis next saw military action in 1776 in the American War of Independence. Active in the advance forces of many campaigns, in 1780 he inflicted a major defeat on the Continental Army at the Battle of Camden. He also commanded British forces in the March 1781 in a pyrrhic victory at Guilford Court House. Cornwallis surrendered his army at Yorktown in October 1781 after an extended campaign through the Southern colonies, marked by disagreements between him and his superior, Sir Henry Clinton.

Despite this defeat, Cornwallis retained the confidence of successive British governments and continued to enjoy an active career. Knighted in 1786, he was in that year appointed to be Governor-General and commander-in-chief in India. There he enacted numerous significant reforms within the East India Company and its territories, including the Cornwallis Code, part of which implemented important land taxation reforms known as the Permanent Settlement. From 1789 to 1792 he led British and Company forces in the Third Anglo-Mysore War to defeat the Mysorean ruler Tipu Sultan.

Returning to Britain in 1794, Cornwallis was given the post of Master-General of the Ordnance. In 1798 he was appointed Lord Lieutenant and Commander-in-chief of Ireland, where he oversaw the response to the 1798 Irish Rebellion, including a French invasion of Ireland, and was instrumental in bringing about the Union of Great Britain and Ireland. Following his Irish service, Cornwallis was the chief British signatory to the 1802 Treaty of Amiens and was reappointed to India in 1805. He died in India not long after his arrival.

== Early life and family ==
Cornwallis was born in Grosvenor Square in London. He was the eldest son of Charles Cornwallis, 5th Baron Cornwallis. His mother, Elizabeth, was the daughter of Charles Townshend, 2nd Viscount Townshend, and niece of Sir Robert Walpole, the first British prime minister. His uncle, Frederick, was Archbishop of Canterbury. Frederick's twin brother, Edward, was a military officer, colonial governor and the founder of Halifax, Nova Scotia. His brother William became an Admiral in the Royal Navy. His other brother, James, eventually inherited the earldom from Cornwallis's son, Charles.

The family was established at Brome Hall, near Eye, Suffolk, in the 14th century, and its members would represent the county in the House of Commons over the next three hundred years. Frederick Cornwallis, created a Baronet in 1627, fought for King Charles I, and followed King Charles II into exile. He was made Baron Cornwallis, of Eye in the County of Suffolk, in 1661, and by judicious marriages, his descendants increased the importance of his family.

== Early military career ==
Cornwallis was educated at Eton College and Clare College, Cambridge. While playing hockey at Eton, his eye was injured by an accidental blow from Shute Barrington, later Bishop of Durham. He obtained his first commission as Ensign in the 1st Foot Guards, on 8 December 1757. He then sought and gained permission to engage in military studies abroad. After travelling on the continent with a Prussian officer, Captain de Roguin, he studied at the military academy of Turin.

Upon completion of his studies in Turin in 1758, he travelled to Geneva, where he learned that British troops were to be sent to North America in the Seven Years' War. Although he tried to reach his regiment before it sailed from the Isle of Wight, he learnt upon reaching Cologne that it had already sailed. He managed instead to secure an appointment as a staff officer to Lord Granby.

A year later, he participated in the Battle of Minden, a major battle that prevented a French invasion of Hanover. After the battle, he purchased a captaincy in the 85th Regiment of Foot. In 1761 he served with the 12th Foot and was promoted to Brevet Lieutenant-Colonel. He led his regiment in the Battle of Villinghausen on 15–16 July 1761, and was noted for his gallantry. In 1762 his regiment was involved in heavy fighting during the Battle of Wilhelmsthal. A few weeks later they defeated Saxon troops at the Battle of Lutterberg and ended the year by participating in the siege of Cassel.

== Parliament, politics, and marriage ==
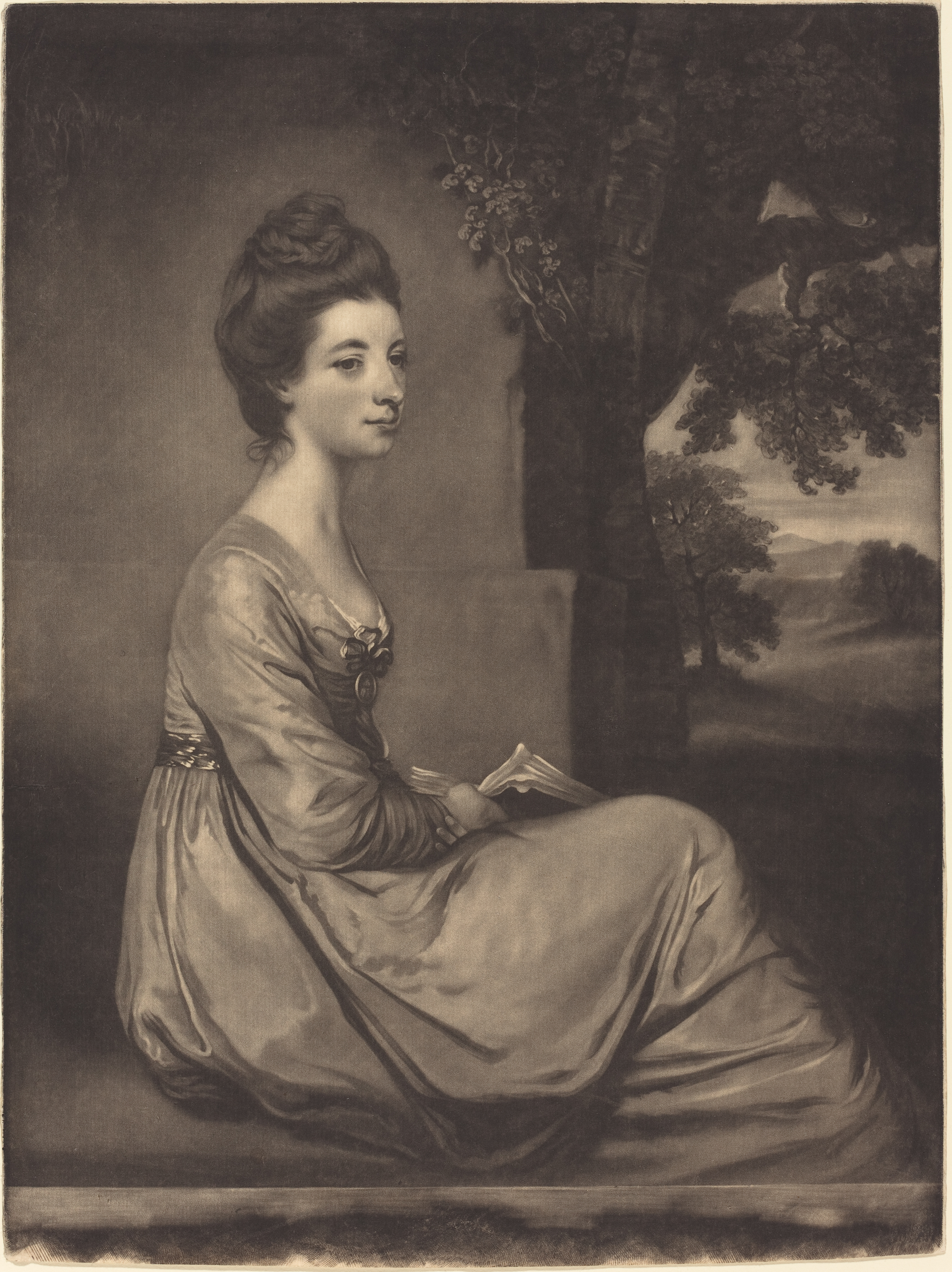
Jemima, Countess Cornwallis

In January 1760 Cornwallis became a member of Parliament, entering the House of Commons for the village of Eye in Suffolk. He succeeded his father as 2nd Earl Cornwallis in 1762, which resulted in his elevation to the House of Lords. He took his seat in the House of Lords on 25 November, 1762. He became a protege of the leading Whig magnate, the future prime minister Lord Rockingham.

He was one of five peers who voted against the 1765 Stamp Act out of sympathy with the colonists. In the following years he maintained a strong degree of support for the colonists during the tensions and crisis that led to the American War of Independence.

On 14 July 1768 he married Jemima Tullekin Jones, daughter of a regimental colonel. The union was, by all accounts, happy. They settled in Culford, Suffolk, where their children, Mary (28 June 1769 – 17 July 1840), and Charles Cornwallis, 2nd Marquess Cornwallis (19 October 1774 – 9 August 1823), were born. Jemima died on 14 February 1779.

== American War of Independence ==
During the postwar years, Cornwallis remained active in military matters. He became colonel of the 33rd Regiment of Foot in 1766. On 29 September 1775 he was promoted to major general. With the outbreak of the war in North America, Cornwallis put his previous misgivings aside and sought active service; proposing an expedition to the southern colonies.

=== Early campaigns ===
Promoted to lieutenant general in North America, he began his service in 1776 under General Sir Henry Clinton with the failed siege of Charleston. He and Clinton then sailed for New York City, where they participated in General William Howe's campaign for New York City. Cornwallis was often given a leading role during this campaign; his division was in the lead at the Battle of Long Island, and he chased the retreating George Washington across New Jersey after the city fell. Howe recognised the successful close of the campaign "much to the honor of his lordship and the officers and soldiers under his command."

General Howe granted Cornwallis leave in December 1776; however, it was cancelled after Washington launched his surprise attack on Trenton on 26 December. Howe ordered Cornwallis to return to New Jersey to deal with Washington. Cornwallis gathered together garrisons scattered across New Jersey and moved them towards Trenton. On 2 January 1777, as he advanced on Trenton, his forces were engaged in extended skirmishing that delayed the army's arrival at Washington's position on the Assunpink Creek until late in the day. Cornwallis was unable to dislodge Washington in the Battle of the Assunpink Creek that followed.

Cornwallis prepared his troops to continue the assault on Washington's position the next day, but critically failed to send out adequate patrols to monitor the Americans. During the night, Washington's forces slipped around Cornwallis's and attacked the British outpost at Princeton. Washington's success was aided by a deception: he had men maintain blazing campfires and keep up sounds of camp activity during his movement. Cornwallis spent the winter in New York and New Jersey, where the forces under his command were engaged in ongoing skirmishes with the Americans.

Cornwallis continued to serve under Howe on his campaign for control of the rebel capital, Philadelphia. Cornwallis was again often in an advance role, leading the flanking manoeuvre at the Battle of Brandywine, and playing key roles at Germantown and Fort Mercer. With the army in winter quarters in Philadelphia, Cornwallis finally returned home for leave. Upon his return in 1778, Howe had been replaced by Clinton as commander in chief, and Cornwallis was now second in command.

The entry of France into the war prompted the British leaders to redeploy their armed forces for a more global war, and Philadelphia was abandoned. Cornwallis commanded the rearguard during the overland withdrawal to New York City and played an important role in the Battle of Monmouth on 28 June 1778. After a surprise attack on the British rearguard, Cornwallis launched a counter-attack which checked the enemy advance. Even though Clinton praised Cornwallis for his performance at Monmouth, he eventually came to blame him for failing to win the day. In November 1778 Cornwallis once more returned to England to be with his ailing wife Jemima, who died in February 1779.

=== Southern theatre ===
Cornwallis returned to America in July 1779, where he was to play a central role as the lead commander of the British "Southern strategy" (which was to invade the south on the assumption that a significantly more Loyalist population would rise up and assist in putting the rebellion down). At the end of 1779, Henry Clinton and Cornwallis transported a large force south and initiated the second siege of Charleston during the spring of 1780, which resulted in the surrender of the Continental forces under Benjamin Lincoln. After the siege of Charleston and the destruction of Abraham Buford's Virginia regiments at Waxhaw, Clinton returned to New York, leaving Cornwallis in command in the south. The relationship between Clinton and Cornwallis had noticeably soured during the Charleston campaign, and they were barely on speaking terms when Clinton left.

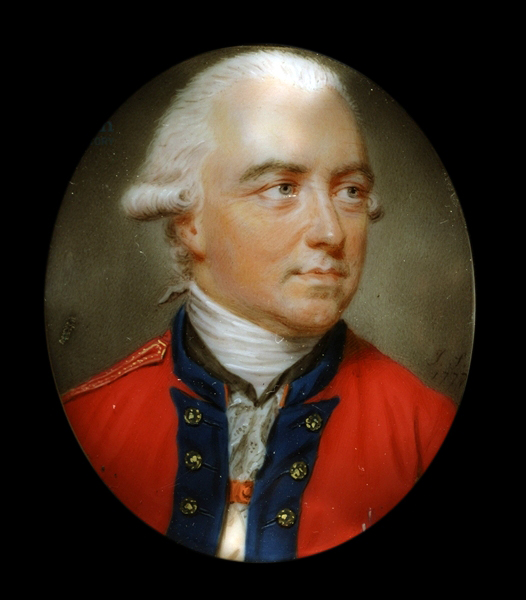
Portrait of Sir Henry Clinton by John Smart, c. 1777

The task Clinton left Cornwallis with was to, first and foremost, preserve the gains made by taking Charleston, and only then engage in offensive moves. Clinton's orders gave Cornwallis wide latitude in how to achieve the goal of pacifying both South and North Carolina, after which Clinton expected Cornwallis to move into Virginia. Clinton wrote, "I should wish you to assist in operations which will certainly be carried on in the Chesapeake as soon as we are relieve from our apprehension of a superior fleet and the season will admit ..."

Clinton provided Cornwallis with a relatively modest force of British, German, and provincial (Loyalist) regiments—about 3,000 men—with which to accomplish all of this. The forces he was given to accomplish this were limited by the necessity of keeping a large British force in New York under Clinton to shadow Washington. Cornwallis was expected to recruit more Loyalists, who were believed to be more numerous in the southern colonies.

Cornwallis established a series of outposts in South Carolina, but keeping communication and supply lines open was an ongoing challenge. Supplies not available locally (like uniforms, camp gear, arms, and ammunition) were delivered all too infrequently, supply ships were frequent targets of local privateers, and bad weather impeded the work. In order to help provide fresh food and forage for his troops, Cornwallis established two commissioners. The first was responsible for administering goods confiscated from Patriots (he avoided confiscating supplies from Loyalists since he depended on them for manpower and intelligence), and the second for administering land that was confiscated.

A chronic shortage of hard currency (another supply only infrequently delivered to Charleston) made it difficult to purchase supplies from any source, either Patriot or Loyalist. Cornwallis also attempted to reestablish civil authority under British or Loyalist oversight. Although these attempts met with limited success, they were continually undermined by Patriot activity, both political and military, and the indifferent abuses of British and Loyalist forces. Patriot militia companies constantly harassed Loyalists, small British units, and supply and communication lines.

In August 1780 Cornwallis's forces met a larger but relatively untried army under the command of Horatio Gates at the Battle of Camden, where they inflicted heavy casualties and routed part of the force. This served to keep South Carolina clear of Continental forces, and was a blow to rebel morale. The victory added to his reputation, although the rout of the American rebels had as much to do with the failings of Gates (whose rapid departure from the battlefield was widely noted) as it did the skill of Cornwallis. In London, Cornwallis was perceived as a hero, and was viewed by many there as the right man to lead the British forces to victory over the rebels.

As the opposition seemed to melt away, Cornwallis optimistically began to advance north into North Carolina while militia activity continued to harass the troops he left in South Carolina. Attempts by Cornwallis to rally Loyalist support were dealt significant blows when a large gathering of them was defeated at Kings Mountain, only a day's march from Cornwallis and his army, and another large detachment of his army was decisively defeated at Cowpens. He then clashed with the rebuilt Continental army under General Nathanael Greene at Guilford Court House in North Carolina, winning a Pyrrhic victory with a bayonet charge against a numerically superior enemy. In the battle he controversially ordered grape shot to be fired into a mass of combat that resulted in friendly casualties but helped to break the American line.

Cornwallis then moved his forces to Wilmington on the coast to resupply. Cornwallis himself had generally been successful in his battles, but the constant marching and the losses incurred had shrunk and tired out his army. Greene, whose army was still intact after the loss at Guilford Courthouse, shadowed Cornwallis toward Wilmington, but then crossed into South Carolina, where over the course of several months American forces regained control over most of the state.

Cornwallis received dispatches in Wilmington informing him that another British army under Generals William Phillips and Benedict Arnold had been sent to Virginia. Believing that North Carolina could not be subdued unless its supply lines from Virginia were cut, he decided to join forces with Phillips.

=== Virginia campaign ===
Upon his arrival in Virginia Cornwallis took command of Phillips' army. Phillips, a personal friend of Cornwallis, died one week before Cornwallis reached his position at Petersburg. He then sought to fulfil orders Clinton had given to Phillips, and raided the Virginia countryside, destroying American military and economic targets.

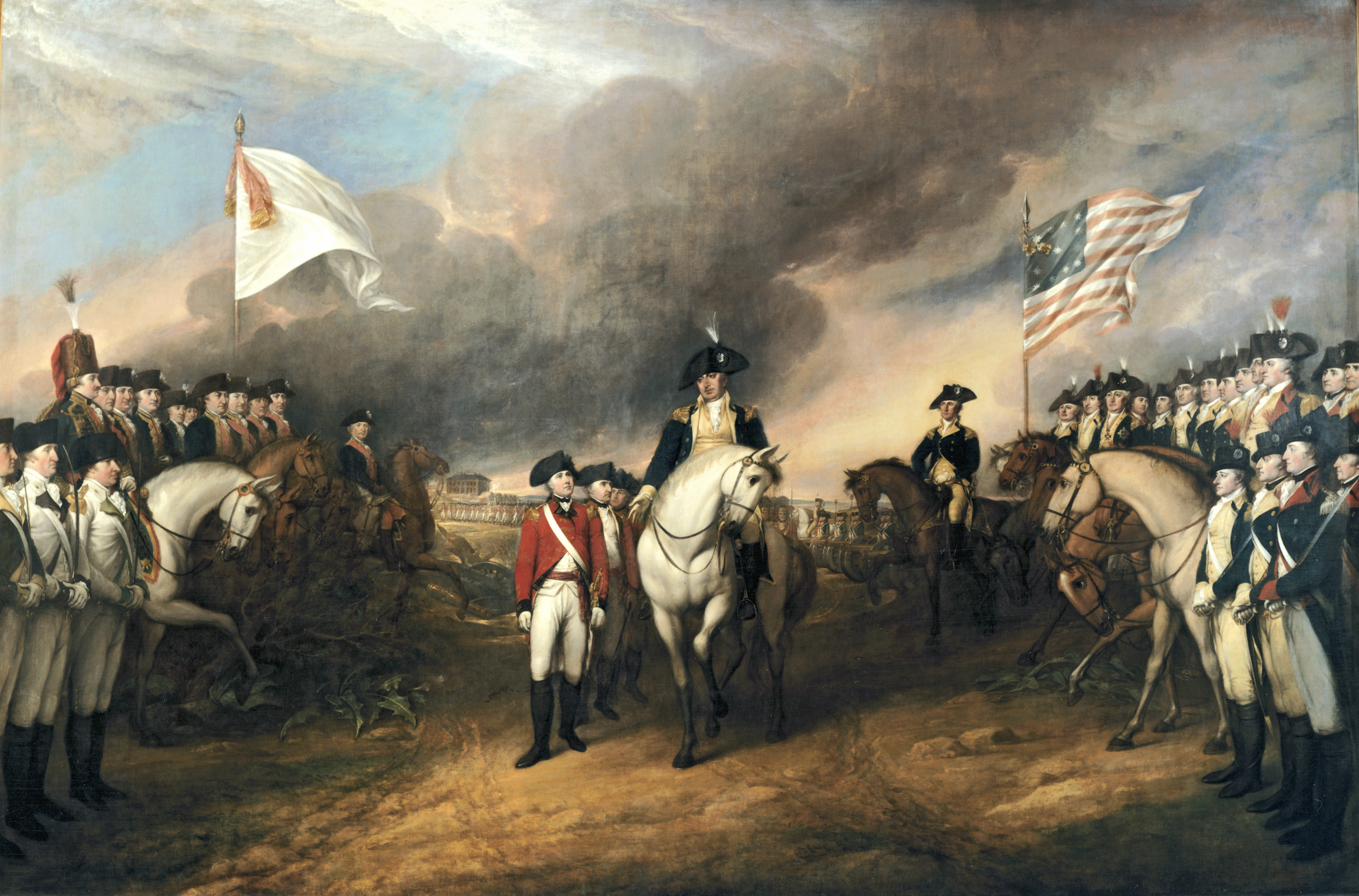
Surrender of Lord Cornwallis by John Trumbull

In March 1781, in response to the threat posed by Arnold and Phillips, General Washington dispatched the Marquis de Lafayette to defend Virginia. The young Frenchman had 3,200 men at his command, but British troops under Cornwallis's command totalled 7,200. Lafayette skirmished with Cornwallis, avoiding a decisive battle while gathering reinforcements. It was during this period that Cornwallis and Clinton exchanged a series of letters in which Clinton issued a number of confusing, contradictory, and not entirely forceful orders.

Cornwallis eventually received firm orders from Clinton to choose a position on the Virginia Peninsula—referred to in contemporary letters as the "Williamsburg Neck"—and construct a fortified naval post to shelter ships of the line. In complying with this order, Cornwallis put himself in a position to become trapped in the area of Yorktown. With the arrival of the French fleet under the Comte de Grasse and General Washington's combined French-American army, Cornwallis found himself cut off. After the Royal Navy fleet under Admiral Thomas Graves was defeated by the French at the Battle of the Chesapeake, and the French siege train arrived from Newport, Rhode Island, his position became untenable.

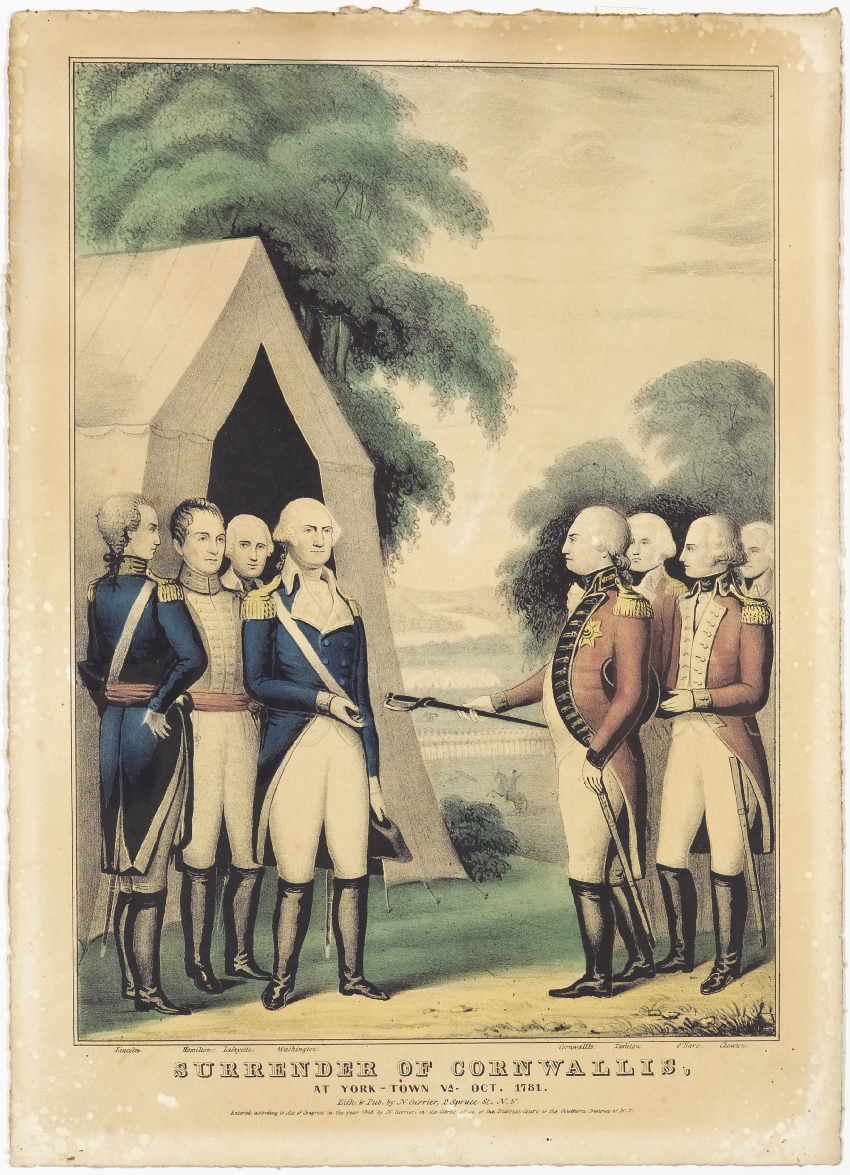
Surrender of Cornwallis. At York-town, VA Oct. 1781 by Nathaniel Currier (D'Amour Museum of Fine Arts)

He surrendered after about three weeks' siege to General Washington and the French commander, the Comte de Rochambeau, on 19 October 1781. Cornwallis, apparently not wanting to face Washington, claimed to be ill on the day of the surrender, and sent Brigadier General Charles O'Hara in his place to surrender his sword formally. Washington had his second-in-command, Major General Benjamin Lincoln, accept Cornwallis's sword.

=== Return to Britain ===
Cornwallis returned to Europe with Benedict Arnold, and they were cheered when they landed in Britain on 21 January 1782. His surrender did not mark the end of the war, though it ended major fighting in the American theatre. Because he was released on parole, Cornwallis refused to serve again until the war came to an end in 1783. An attempt failed to exchange him for Henry Laurens, an American diplomat who was released from the Tower of London in anticipation that Cornwallis would be freed from his parole.

His tactics in America, especially during the southern campaign, were a frequent subject of criticism by his political enemies in London, principally General Clinton, who tried to blame him for the failures of the southern campaign. This led to an exchange of pamphlets between the two men in which Cornwallis had much the better of the argument. Cornwallis also retained the confidence of George III and the Shelburne ministry, but he was placed in a financially precarious state by his inability to be on active duty.

In August 1785 he was sent to Prussia as an ambassador to the court of Frederick the Great to sound out a possible alliance. He attended manoeuvres along with the Duke of York where they encountered his old opponent Lafayette. In October 1785 Cornwallis wrote dismissively of Prussian military manoeuvres while in Hanover, writing that: ''Their manoeuvres were such as the worst General in England would be hooted at for practising; two lines coming up within six yards of one another, and firing in one another's faces till they had no ammunition left: nothing could be more ridiculous.''

== Governor-General of Fort William ==
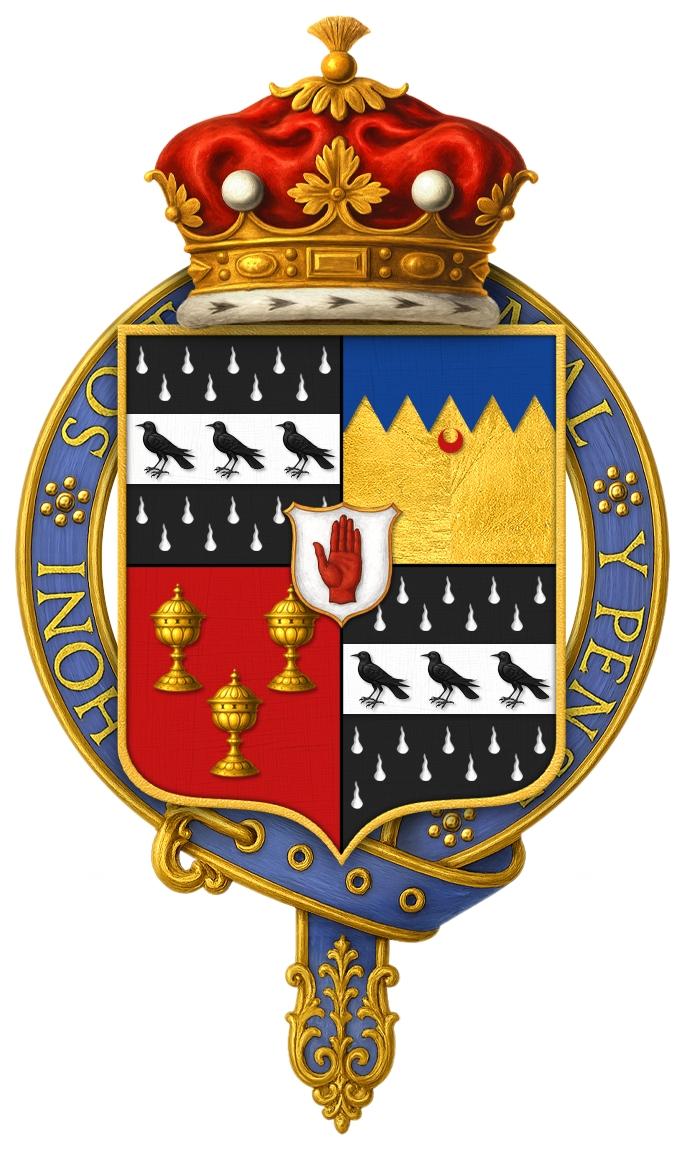
Quartered arms of Charles Cornwallis, 1st Marquess Cornwallis, KG, PC

In 1786 Cornwallis was made a Knight Companion of the Most Noble Order of the Garter. The same year he accepted appointment as Governor-General and commander in chief in India. He had in 1782 been offered the governor-generalship only, but refused the post until he also received military command as well.

=== Reforms ===
Cornwallis engaged in reforms of all types, that affected many areas of civil, military, and corporate administration. According to historian Jerry Dupont, Cornwallis was responsible for "laying the foundation for British rule throughout India and setting standards for the services, courts and revenue collection that remained remarkably unaltered almost to the end of the British era." He also enacted important reforms in the operations of the British East India Company. Cornwallis had been sent to India with instructions to avoid war in the sub-continent and was largely successful in this, though he had to abandon his non-interventionism to engage in war with the Kingdom of Mysore when they attacked British allies.

Prior to Cornwallis's tenure, company employees were allowed to trade on their own accounts and use company ships to send their own goods back to Europe. This practice was tolerated when the company was profitable, but by the 1780s the company's finances were not in good shape. Cornwallis eliminated the practice, increasing employee salaries in compensation. He also worked to reduce nepotism and political favouritism, instituting the practice of merit-based advancement.

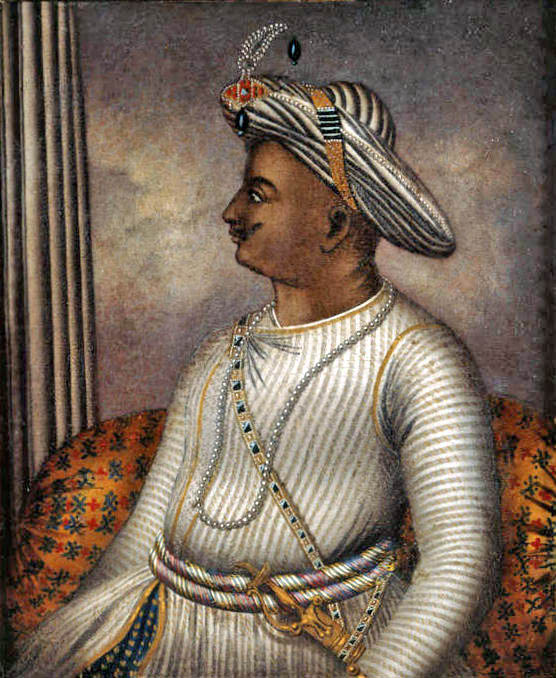
Tipu Sultan, ruler of the Kingdom of Mysore

Criminal and civil justice systems in the company's territories were a confusing overlay of legal systems, jurisdictions, and methods of administration. Cornwallis had the company take over the few remaining judicial powers of the Nawab of Bengal, the titular local ruler of much of the Bengal Presidency, and gave some judicial powers to company employees. In 1790 he introduced circuit courts with company employees as judges, and set up a court of appeals in Calcutta. He had the legal frameworks of Muslim and Hindu law translated into English, and promulgated administrative regulations and a new civil and criminal code in 1793, which became known as the Cornwallis Code.

Cornwallis also began a policy of excluding Indians from the senior administrative and military roles of British India; on 19 April 1791, he issued a standing order which stated that "No person, the son of a Native Indian, shall henceforward be appointed by this Court to Employment in the Civil, Military, or Marine Service of the Company." The American historian Franklin Bacon Wickwire argued that through this policy Cornwallis "institutionalized racism". He also prevented the sons of European fathers and Indian mothers from becoming army officers, writing that "as on account of their colour & extraction they are considered in this country as inferior to Europeans, I am of opinion that those of them who possess the best abilities could not command that authority and respect which is necessary in the due discharge of the duty of an officer."

Cornwallis's attitude toward the lower classes did, however, include a benevolent and somewhat paternalistic desire to improve their condition. He introduced legislation to protect native weavers who were sometimes forced into working at starvation wages by unscrupulous company employees, outlawed child slavery, and established in 1791 a Sanskrit college for Hindus that is now the Government Sanskrit College in Benares. He also established a mint in Calcutta that, in addition to benefiting the poor by providing a reliable standard currency, was a forerunner of India's modern currency.

Part of the Cornwallis Code was an important land taxation reform known in India as the Permanent Settlement. This reform permanently altered the way the company collected taxes in its territories, by taxing landowners (known as zamindars) based on the value of their land and not necessarily the value of its produce. In the minds of Cornwallis and its architects, the reforms would also protect land tenants (ryots) from the abusive practices of the zamindars intended to maximise production. Cornwallis, a landed gentleman himself, especially believed that a class of landed gentry would naturally concern themselves with the improvement of the lands, thus also improving the condition of its tenants. Nevertheless, the Permanent Settlement effectively left the peasants at the mercy of the landowners. While the Company fixed the land revenue to be paid by the landowners, the zamindars were left free to extract as much as they could from the peasantry

=== Diplomacy and war with Mysore ===
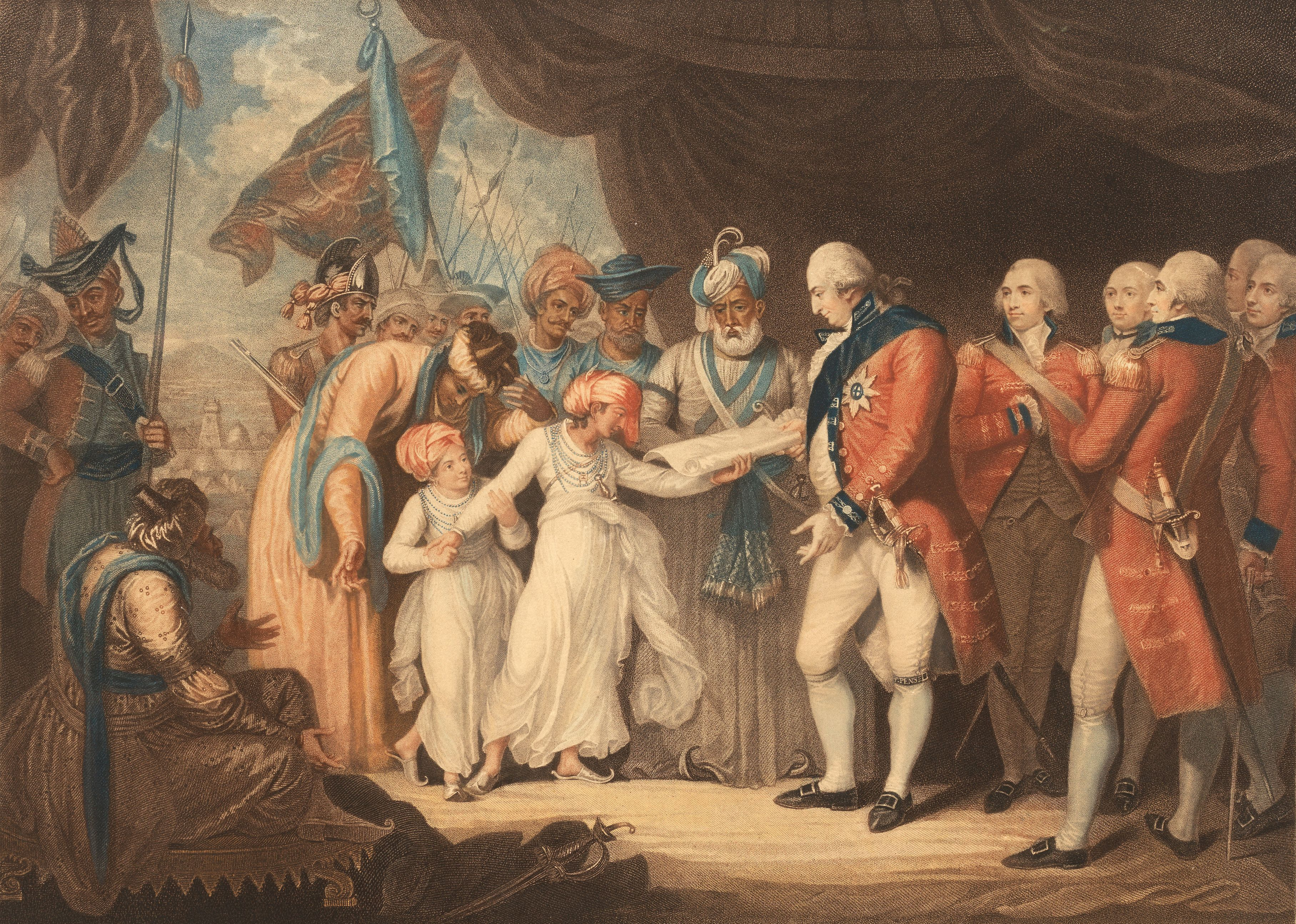
Cornwallis receiving Tipu Sultan's sons as hostages on 26 February 1792 at the end of the Third Anglo-Mysore War

Cornwallis had been sent to India with instructions to avoid conflict with the company's neighbours. Early in his tenure, he abrogated agreements with the Maratha Empire and the Nizam of Hyderabad that he saw as violating the 1784 Treaty of Mangalore that ended the Second Anglo-Mysore War. This ensured the company's non-involvement in the Maratha-Mysore War (1785–1787). He was, however, manoeuvred into the establishment of a new company based at Penang (in present-day Malaysia), where conflict was avoided when he agreed to pay a stipend to the local rajah for use of the base. Fort Cornwallis in Penang is named for Cornwallis.

The King of Nepal appealed to Cornwallis in 1792 for military assistance. Cornwallis declined the king's request, sending instead Colonel William Kirkpatrick to mediate the dispute. Kirkpatrick was the first Englishman to see Nepal; by the time he reached Kathmandu in 1793, the parties had already resolved their dispute.

The company was unavoidably drawn into war with Mysore in 1790. Tipu Sultan, Mysore's ruler, had expressed contempt for the British not long after signing the 1784 Treaty of Mangalore, and also expressed a desire to renew conflict with them. In late 1789 he invaded the Kingdom of Travancore, a company ally according to that treaty, because of territorial disputes and Travancore's harbouring of refugees from other Mysorean actions. Cornwallis ordered company and Crown troops to mobilise in response. The 1790 campaign against Tipu was conducted by General William Medows, and it was a limited success. Medows successfully occupied the Coimbatore district, but Tipu counterattacked and was able to reduce the British position to a small number of strongly held outposts. Tipu then invaded the Carnatic, where he attempted unsuccessfully to draw the French into the conflict. Because of Medows' weak campaigning, Cornwallis personally took command of the British forces in 1791.

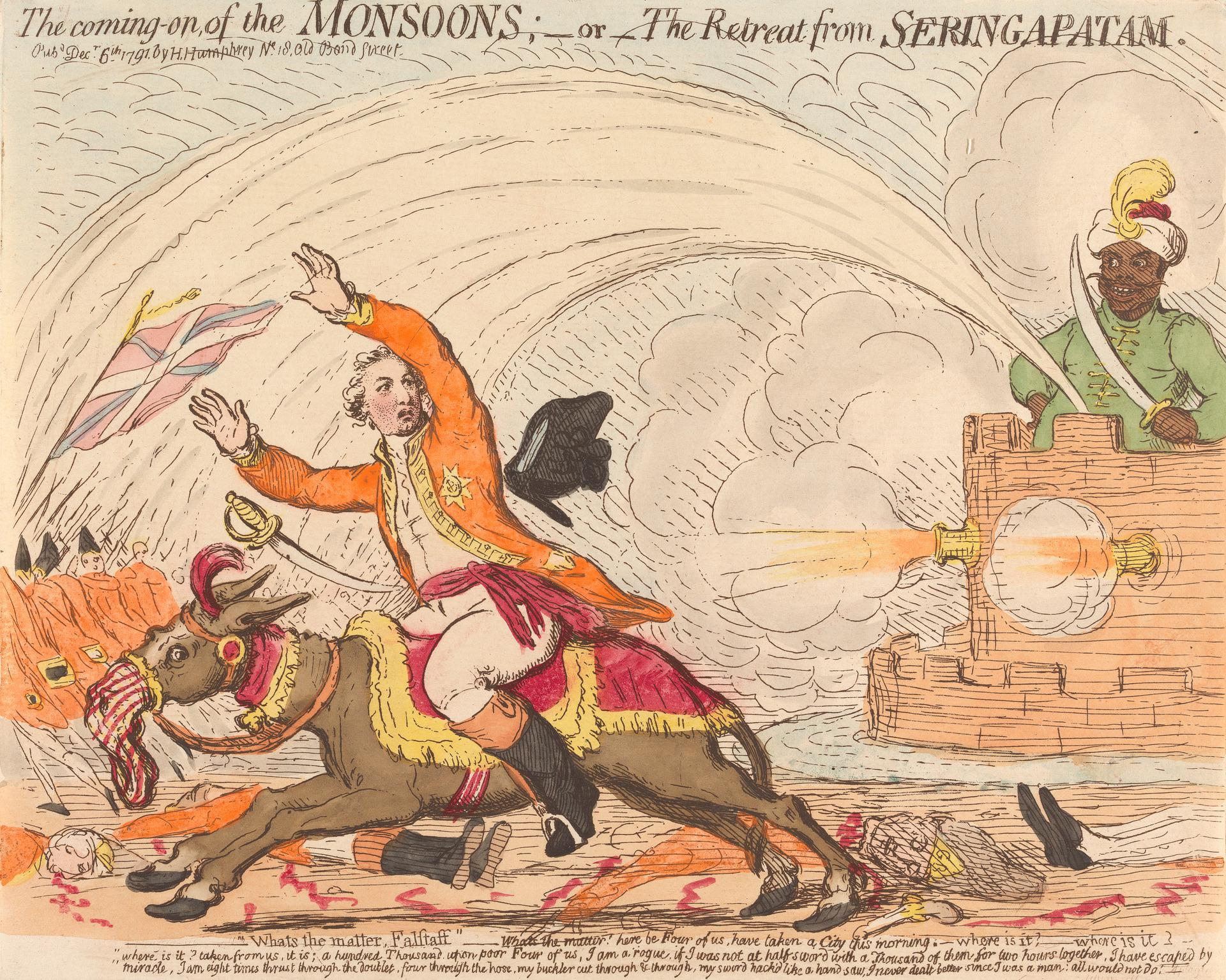
A political cartoon by James Gillray making fun of Cornwallis after his retreat from Seringapatam

When the war broke out, Cornwallis negotiated alliances with the Marathas and Hyderabad. Cornwallis ascended the Eastern Ghats to reach the Deccan Plateau in February 1791. After successfully besieging Bangalore, Cornwallis then joined forces with Hyderabadi forces that he described as "extremely defective in almost every point of military discipline", and their presence in the army ultimately presented more difficulties than assistance. These forces then marched toward the Mysorean capital at Seringapatam, compelling Tipu to retreat into the city at the Battle of Arakere on 15 May. Dwindling provisions, and exacerbated by Tipu's slash-and-burn tactics, forced Cornwallis to abandon the idea of besieging Seringapatam that season, so he retreated to Bangalore.

In January 1792, the army, now well-provisioned, set out for Seringapatam. Arriving before the city on 5 February, Cornwallis quickly eliminated Tipu's defensive positions outside the city, and then began siege operations. Tipu requested negotiations on 23 February, and peace was agreed on 18 March. Cornwallis and his allies demanded the cession of half of the Mysorean territory, much of which went to the allies. As a guarantee of Tipu's performance, two of his sons were delivered to Cornwallis as hostages. Cornwallis and other British commanders, in a move appreciated by their soldiers, donated prize money awarded them to be distributed among the rank and file.

For his success in conducting the war, Cornwallis was created Marquess Cornwallis in 1792, although he did not learn of it until the following year. He departed for England in October 1793, and was succeeded by Sir John Shore.

== Master of the Ordnance ==
Upon his return to Britain in 1794, he found it militarily engaged in the French Revolutionary Wars. After he was sent on an ultimately fruitless diplomatic mission to stop the fighting, he was appointed Master of the Ordnance, a post he held until 1798. In this position he was responsible for much of the British Army's military infrastructure, overseeing its storage depots and supply infrastructure, as well as commanding its artillery and engineering forces. He oversaw improvements to Britain's coastal defences, and was able to expand Woolwich Academy's artillery training program to address a significant shortage of qualified artillery officers. His attempts to significantly reform the military were hampered by the ongoing war.

== Lord Lieutenant of Ireland ==
In June 1798 he was appointed Lord Lieutenant of Ireland and Commander-in-Chief, Ireland. His appointment, which had been discussed as early as 1797, was made in response to the outbreak in late May of the Irish Rebellion of 1798. His appointment was greeted unfavourably by the Irish elite, who preferred his predecessor Lord Camden, and suspected he had liberal sympathies with the predominantly Catholic rebels. However, he struck up a good working relationship with Lord Castlereagh, whom he had appointed as Chief Secretary for Ireland.

In his combined role as both Lord Lieutenant and Commander-in-Chief of the Royal Irish Army Cornwallis oversaw the defeat of both the Irish rebels and a French invasion force led by General Jean Humbert that landed in Connacht in August 1798. Panicked by the landing and the subsequent British defeat at the Battle of Castlebar, Pitt despatched thousands of reinforcements to Ireland, swelling British forces there to 60,000. The French invaders were defeated and forced to surrender at the Battle of Ballinamuck, after which Cornwallis ordered the execution by lot of a number of Irish rebels. During the autumn Cornwallis secured government control over most of the island, and organised the suppression of the remaining supporters of the United Irish movement.

Cornwallis was also instrumental in securing passage in 1800 of the Act of Union by the Parliament of Ireland, a necessary step in the creation of the United Kingdom of Great Britain and Ireland. The process, which essentially required the buying of Parliamentary votes through patronage and the granting of peerages, was one that Cornwallis found quite distasteful: he wrote "My occupation is now of the most unpleasant nature, negotiating and jobbing with the most corrupt people under heaven. I despise and hate myself every hour for engaging in such dirty work, and am supported only by the reflection that without a Union the British Empire must be dissolved." Although Cornwallis recognised that the union with Ireland was unlikely to succeed without Catholic emancipation, he and William Pitt were unable to move King George on the subject. Pitt consequently resigned, and Cornwallis also resigned his offices, returning to London in May 1801.

== Treaty of Amiens ==
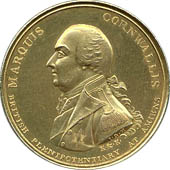
Medal commemorating Cornwallis's role in negotiating the Treaty of Amiens, 1802

Expecting an opportunity to relax at home, Cornwallis was instead despatched not long after his return to take command of Eastern District with orders to lead the defences of eastern Britain against a threatened French invasion. Cornwallis was then sent to France to finalise peace terms with Bonaparte. The peace negotiations were made possible in Britain by financial pressure brought on by the ongoing wars and by Bonaparte's desire to consolidate his hold on the Continent. Pitt's resignation brought Henry Addington to power, and he appointed Cornwallis as plenipotentiary minister to France.

The negotiations resulted in the Treaty of Amiens, which Cornwallis signed on behalf of the United Kingdom on 25 March 1802. The treaty ended the War of the Second Coalition, but the peace was short-lived. Actions by Bonaparte over the next year alarmed the other European powers, and the United Kingdom refused to withdraw forces from Malta as specified in the treaty. By May 1803 war was again declared. Cornwallis is often seen as being partially responsible for conceding too much in the negotiations, although much had already been granted to France in the preliminary negotiations.

== Death and legacy ==
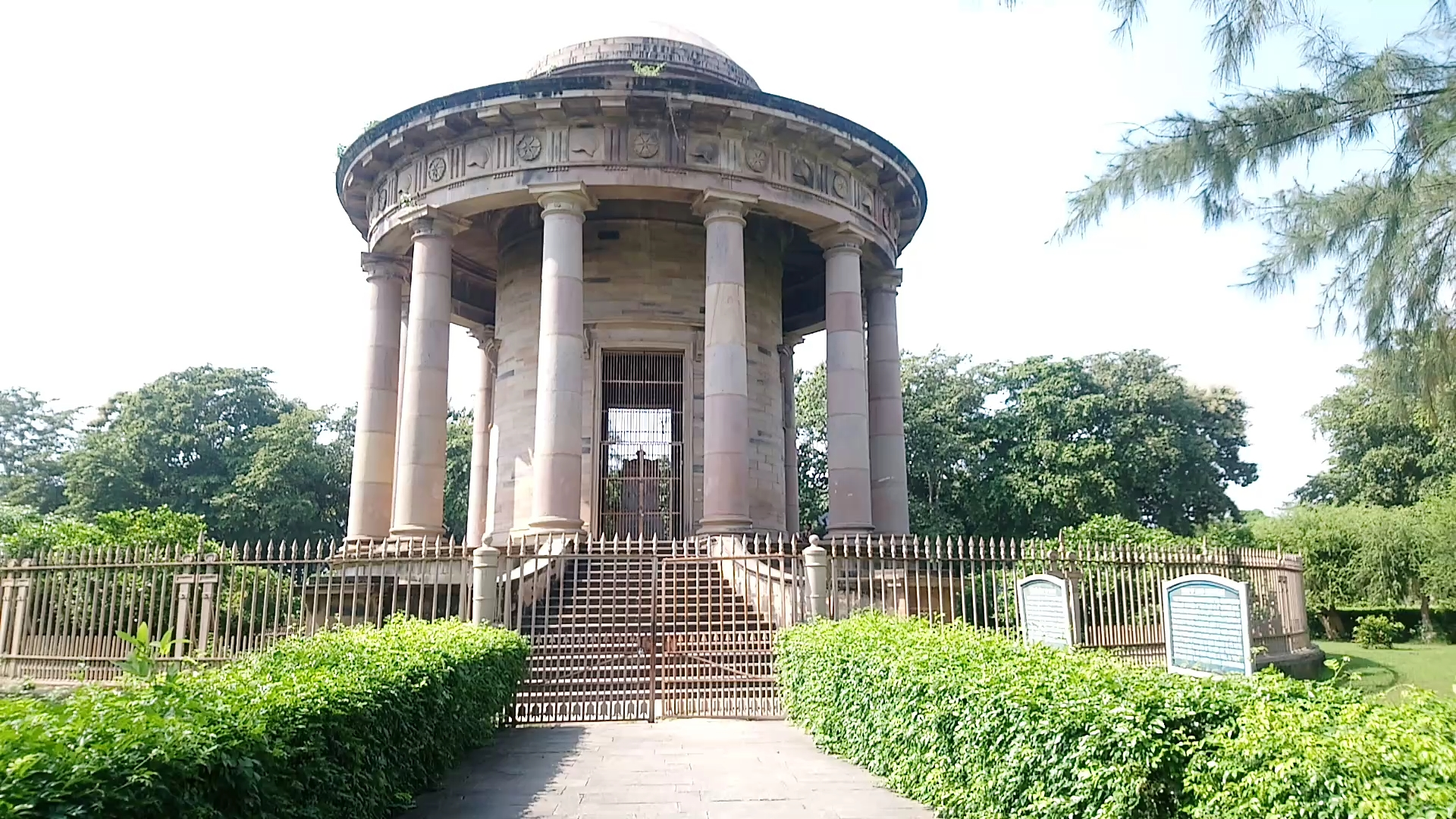
Cornwallis's Tomb in Ghazipur

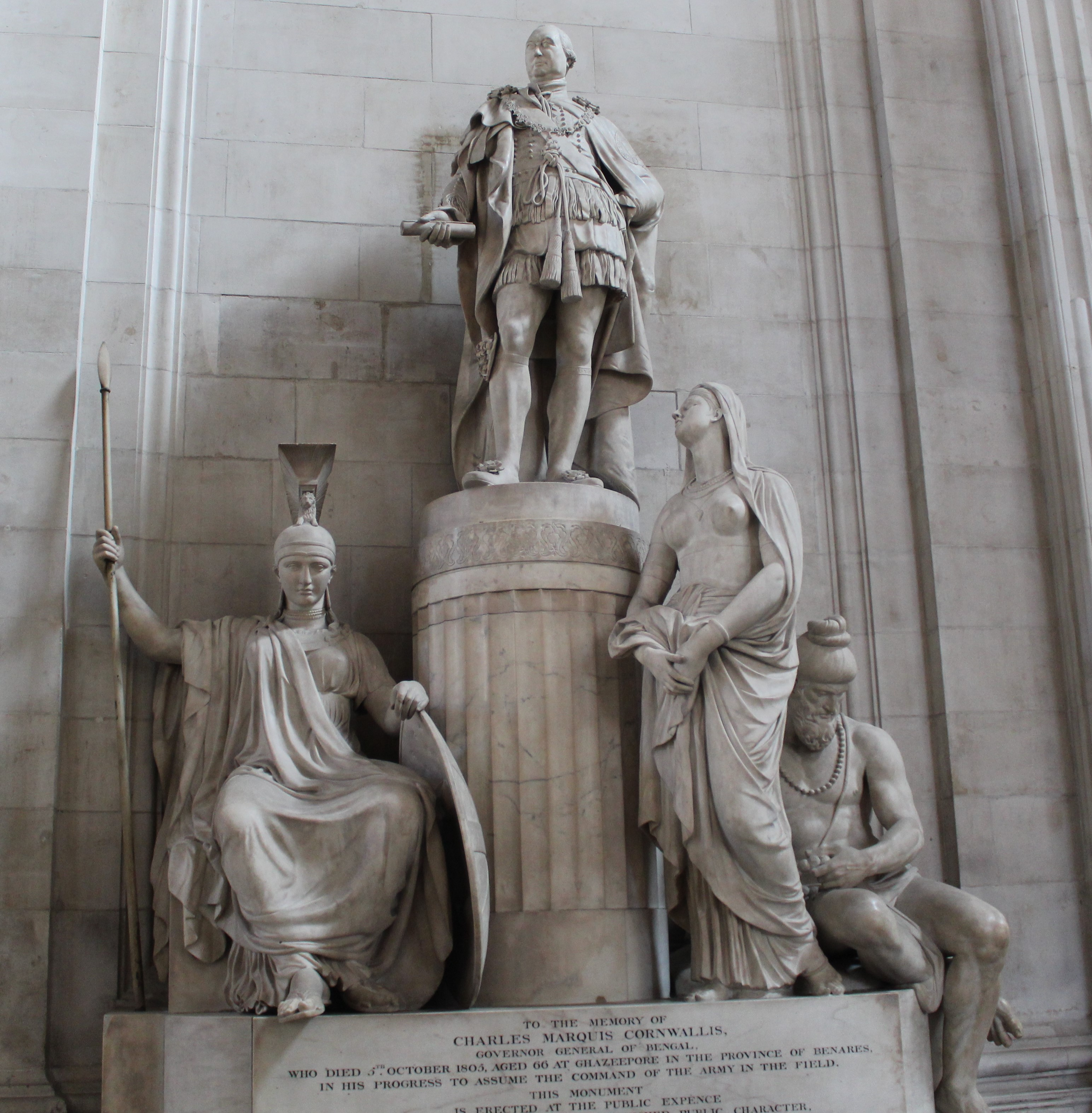
Cornwallis monument, St Paul's Cathedral

In 1805 Cornwallis was reappointed Governor-General of India by Pitt (who had again become prime minister), this time to curb the expansionist activity of Lord Wellesley (older brother of Colonel Arthur Wellesley, later the Duke of Wellington). He arrived in India in July 1805, and died on 5 October of a fever at Gauspur in Ghazipur, at that time in the Varanasi kingdom. Cornwallis was buried there, overlooking the Ganges River, where his memorial is a protected monument maintained by the Archaeological Survey of India. There is also a memorial to him in St Paul's Cathedral.

His son Charles became the 2nd Marquess. Having five daughters but no sons, the marquessate became extinct on his death, but he was succeeded in his remaining titles by his uncle, the brother of the general, the Right Reverend James Cornwallis.

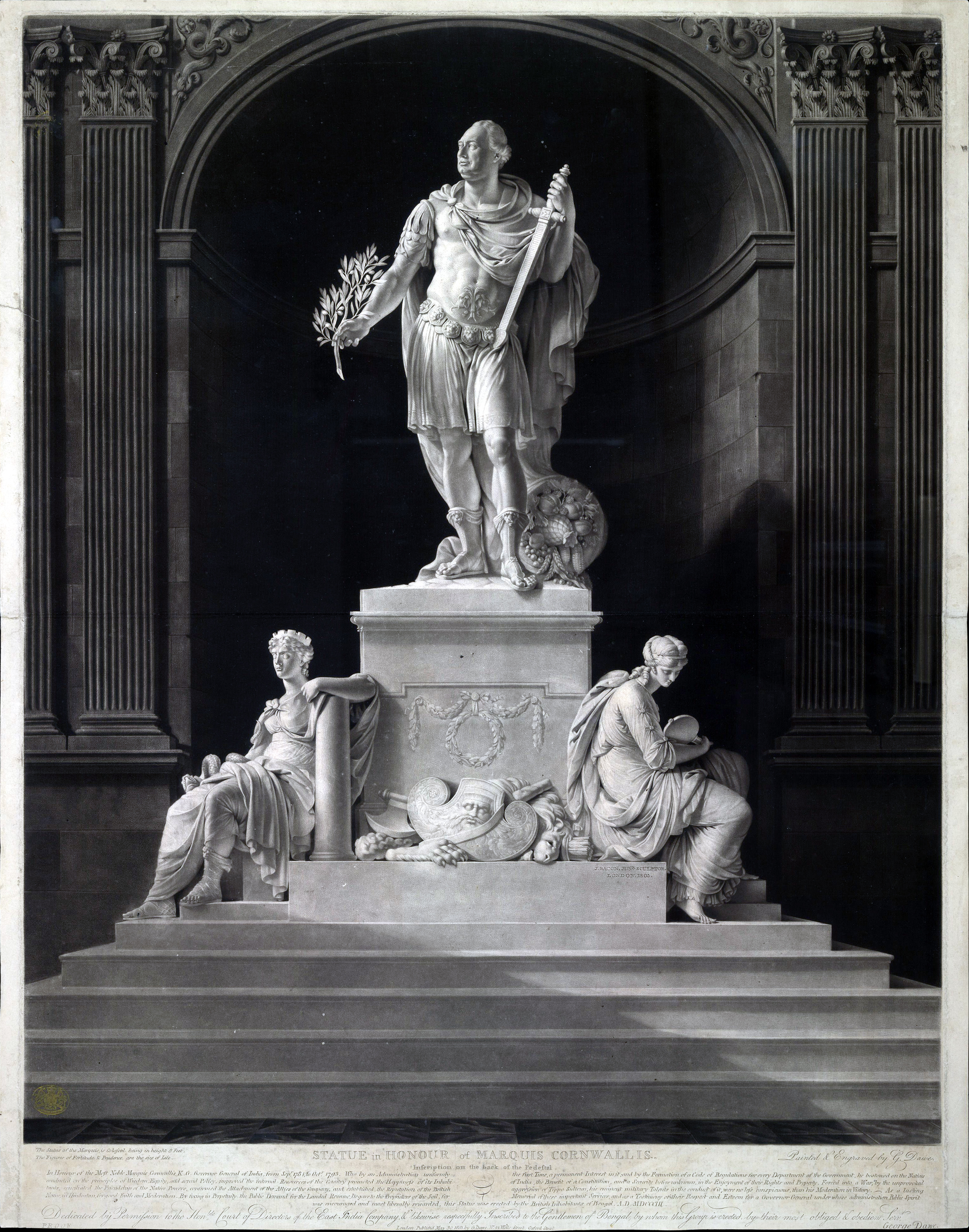
A statue of Cornwallis by John Bacon and John Bacon Jr. The statue now stands in the Victoria Memorial in Kolkata.

Cornwallis appears in the 1835 novel Horse-Shoe Robinson by John Pendleton Kennedy, a historical romance set against the background of the Southern campaigns in the American War of Independence, and interacts with the fictional characters in the book. He is depicted as courtly in manner, but tolerant, or even supportive, of brutal practices against those found deficient among his own forces, and against enemy prisoners. In the 2000 film The Patriot about the events leading up to Yorktown, Cornwallis was portrayed by English actor Tom Wilkinson. Cornwallis also appears in Harry Turtledove's Atlantis series of alternate history novels, taking part in variants of the French and Indian War and American Revolutionary War.

In Ireland his legacy also includes the Wicklow Military Road (now the R115) through the Wicklow Mountains. Fictional accounts of the rebellion, such as The Year of the French by Thomas Flanagan, feature Cornwallis. In India, he is remembered for his victory against Tipu Sultan in the Mysore war and his promulgation of revenue and judicial acts. Fort Cornwallis, founded in 1786 in George Town, Prince of Wales Island (now the island part of the Malaysian state of Penang), is named for him.

The coastal township of Cornwallis, New Zealand, was named after him by his nephew, William Cornwallis Symonds. A building is named after him at the University of Kent, as are boarding houses at the Royal Hospital School and Culford School in Suffolk. Statues of Cornwallis can be seen in St. Paul's Cathedral, London, Fort Museum, Fort St. George, Chennai, and in the Victoria Memorial, Kolkata. The public house "The Marquis of Cornwallis" in Layham, Suffolk, was named after him. Roads named after him include Cornwallis Street in Liverpool, Cornwallis Road in the London Borough of Islington, and Cornwallis Road in Oxford.

Cornwallis was the recipient of the first British commemorative statue sent to the Indian subcontinent. On his retirement in 1792, and in celebration of his victory over Tipu Sultan, the British residents of Madras (renamed Chennai in 1996) voted in May that year to commission a portrait in oils, and a statue, for their city. A request was sent, through Sir John Call, to the Council of the Royal Academy in London to hold a competition. Only one artist submitted a model, and that was Thomas Banks, RA. The statue was unveiled on the Parade Grounds of Fort St. George, Madras, on 15 May 1800, after being exhibited at the Royal Academy. The eight-foot-tall marble with its pedestal base depicts the children of Tipu Sultan being handed over to Cornwallis as part of the treaty to end the war. Cornwallis wears the robes of a Garter Knight. After Independence, the statue was moved to the Reading Room of the Connemara Library, Madras, before it was transferred to the entrance of the Fort Museum in 1948.

The first British statue to be erected in Calcutta, the capital of British India, was also to Cornwallis. The marble portrait statue, with figures of Fortitude and Truth on each side of the plinth's base, was completed by John Bacon Jr., and was a variant of the statue finished by John Bacon Sr. for East India House in London. In this work, Cornwallis appears as a hero wearing a Roman kilt and carrying a sheathed short sword. A cornucopia symbolising the abundance pouring into the coffers of the East India Company (EIC) is behind the left foot.

A third statue, for Bombay, was commissioned from the studios of John Bacon Jr. Bacon was paid £5250 for the standing figure, which portrayed Cornwallis wearing an officer's tailcoat, breeches, brocade and an immense cloak. The statue was covered by a protective cupola on Elphinstone Circle, before it was damaged in August 1965 and removed to the grounds of the Bhau Daji Lad Museum, Byculla, Bombay.

The last memorial erected to Cornwallis in British India was his mausoleum at Ghazipur, completed in 1824 and funded by a public subscription raised by the people of Bengal. Designed by Thomas Fraser, the free-standing marble cenotaph, topped by a funerary urn, was created by John Flaxman, RA. It was commissioned by the Court of Directors of the East India Company at a General Meeting held in February 1822. Flaxman completed the work in March 1824 and it was shipped to India in April. Flaxman received £525 for his portrait medallion of Cornwallis, carved in relief for two of the four panels. The two others have a figure of a Hindu and Muslim, heads bowed in mourning (a typical motif for Flaxman). The reverse has a figure of a British soldier and an Indian sepoy, also in mourning.

== Dates of rank ==
| Ensign, British Army | 1756 |
| Captain, British Army | 1759 |
| Lieutenant-Colonel, British Army | 1761 |
| Colonel, British Army | 1766 |
| Major-General, British Army | 1775 |
| Lieutenant-General, British Army | 1777 |
| General, British Army | 1793 |

== Arms ==
Coat of arms of Charles Cornwallis, 1st Marquess Cornwallis
| Coronet A Coronet of a Marquess Crest On a mount Vert a stag lodged regardant Argent attired Or, gorged with a chaplet of laurel Vert, and vulned on the shoulder Gules Escutcheon Quarterly: First and Fourth, sable guttée d'eau, on a fess Argent three Cornish choughs proper; Second, Or in the honour point a crescent Gules a chief indented Azure; Third, Gules three covered cups; over all, an inescutcheon Argent charged with the badge of an Irish baronet viz. a sinister hand couped Gules Supporters Two stags Argent attired and gorged as the crest Motto VIRTUS VINCET INVIDIAM (Latin for 'Virtue conquers envy') Orders Order of the Garter: HONI SOIT QUI MAL Y PENSE (Anglo-Norman for "Shamed be [the person] who thinks evil of it" or "Shame on him who thinks evil of it") |

== Ancestry ==
Ancestors of Charles Cornwallis, 1st Marquess Cornwallis

8. Charles Cornwallis, 3rd Baron Cornwallis
4. Charles Cornwallis, 4th Baron Cornwallis
9. Elizabeth Fox
2. Charles Cornwallis, 1st Earl Cornwallis
10. Richard Butler, Earl of Arran
5. Lady Charlotte Butler
11. Dorothy Ferrers
1. Charles Cornwallis, 1st Marquess Cornwallis
12. Horatio Townshend, 1st Viscount Townshend
6. Charles Townshend, 2nd Viscount Townshend
13. Mary Ashe
3. Hon. Elizabeth Townshend
14. Thomas Pelham, 1st Baron Pelham
7. Hon. Elizabeth Pelham
15. Elizabeth Jones

== Sources ==
- Bicheno H. (2003). Rebels and Redcoats: The American Revolutionary War. London: William Collins.
- Borick, Carl P. (2003). A Gallant Defense: the Siege of Charleston, 1780. Columbia, SC: University of South Carolina Press. ISBN 978-1-57003-487-9. OCLC 50511391.
- Buchanan, J (1997). The Road to Guilford Courthouse: The American Revolution and the Carolinas. New York: Wiley.
- Carrington, Henry Beebe (1876). Battles of the American Revolution, 1775–1781. New York: A. S. Barnes. p. 584. OCLC 33205321.
- Duffy, Christopher (1985). Frederick the Great: A Military Life. London: Routledge & Kegan Paul. ISBN 978-0689115486.
- Dupont, Jerry (2001). The Common Law Abroad: Constitutional and Legal Legacy of the British Empire. Littleton, CO: Wm. S. Hein. ISBN 978-0-8377-3125-4. OCLC 44016553.
- Ferling, John (1988). The World Turned Upside Down: The American Victory in the War of Independence. New York: Greenwood Press.
- Fewer, Michael (2007). The Wicklow Military Road: History and Topography. Dublin: Ashfield Press. ISBN 978-1-901658-66-8.
- Fischer, David Hackett (2004). Washington's Crossing. New York: Oxford University Press. ISBN 0-19-517034-2.
- Fortescue, John William (1902). A History of the British army, Volume 3. New York: Macmillan.
- Greene, Jerome (2005). The Guns of Independence: The Siege of Yorktown, 1781. New York: Savas Beatie. ISBN 1-932714-05-7. OCLC 60642656.
- Griffiths, Sir Percival (23 April 2019). The British Impact on India. Routledge. ISBN 978-0-429-61545-0.
- Harvey, R (2001). A Few Bloody Noses: The American War of Independence. London: John Murray.
- Harvey, R (2007). War of Wars: The Epic Struggle Between Britain and France 1789–1815. London: Constable.
- Johnston, Henry Phelps (1881). The Yorktown Campaign and the Surrender of Cornwallis, 1781. New York: Harper & Bros. p. 34. OCLC 426009.
- Lecky, William Edward Hartpole (1999) [First published 1892]. A History of Ireland in the Eighteenth Century. London: Longmans, Green. ISBN 978-1-4021-6724-9. OCLC 312999699.
- Middleton, Richard (2022). Cornwallis: Soldier and Statesman in a Revolutionary World. Yale University Press. ISBN 978-0-300-26550-7.
- Mill, James; Wilson, Horace Hayman (1858). The History of British India, Volume 5. London: Piper, Stephenson, and Spence. OCLC 3019507.
- Ooi, Keat Gin, ed. (2004). Southeast Asia: a Historical Encyclopedia, From Angkor Wat to East Timor, Volume 3. Santa Barbara, CA: ABC-CLIO. ISBN 978-1-57607-770-2.
- Pancake, John (1985). This Destructive War. University, AL: University of Alabama Press. ISBN 0-8173-0191-7.
- Piecuch, Jim (2006). The Battle of Camden: a Documentary History. Charleston, SC: The History Press. ISBN 978-1-59629-144-7. OCLC 70219827.
- Rohatgi, Pauline; Parlett, Graham (2009). "Indian Life and Landscape by Western Artists: Beginnings – The English East India Company". Chhatrapati Shivaji Maharaj Vastu Sangrahalaya. Archived from the original on 29 June 2010.
- Cornwallis, Charles (1859). Ross, Charles (ed.). Correspondence of Charles, First Marquis Cornwallis. Vol. 1. London: J. Murray. OCLC 1163639.
- Sen, Sailendra Nath (1994). Anglo–Maratha Relations, 1785–96. Delhi: Popular Prakashan. OCLC 1406688.
- Unger, H.G (2002). Lafayette. New York: John Wiley & Sons.
- Ward, Christopher (1952). War of the Revolution. New York: Macmillan. OCLC 214962727.
- Weintraub, Stanley (2005). Iron Tears, Rebellion in America 1775–1783. London: Free Press. ISBN 978-0-7432-2687-5.
- Wickwire, Franklin and Mary (1970). Cornwallis: The American Adventure. Boston: Houghton Mifflin. OCLC 62690.
- Wickwire, Franklin and Mary (1980). Cornwallis: The Imperial Years. Chapel Hill: University of North Carolina Press. ISBN 0-8078-1387-7.
- Wilbur, Marguerite Eyer (1945). The East India Company and the British Empire in the Far East. New York: R. Smith. OCLC 186486927.
- Whelpton, John (2005). A history of Nepal. Cambridge, UK: Cambridge University Press. ISBN 978-0-521-80470-7. OCLC 55502658.

Political offices
| Preceded by The Viscount Bolingbroke | Lord of the Bedchamber; 1765–1765 | Succeeded by Not replaced |
Parliament of Great Britain
| Preceded by Henry Townshend | Member of Parliament for Eye; 1760–1762; With: Courthorpe Clayton; Henry Cornwallis; Henry Townshend | Succeeded by Richard Burton |
Government offices
| Preceded by John MacPherson | Governor-General of India; 1786–1793 | Succeeded by The Lord Teignmouth |
| Preceded by The Duke of Richmond | Master-General of the Ordnance; 1795–1801 | Succeeded by The Earl of Chatham |
| Preceded by The Marquess Camden | Lord Lieutenant of Ireland; 1798–1801 | Succeeded by The Earl of Hardwicke |
| Preceded by The Marquess Wellesley | Governor-General of India; 1805 | Succeeded by Sir George Barlow, Bt |
Legal offices
| Preceded by The Lord Monson | Justice in Eyre; South of the Trent; 1767–1769 | Succeeded by The Lord Grantley |
Diplomatic posts
| Vacant due to the French Revolutionary Wars Title last held by The Marquess of Stafford | British Plenipotentiary to France; 1801–1802 | Succeeded by The Lord Whitworth |
Military offices
| Preceded by Sir Robert Sloper | Commander-in-Chief, India; 1786–1793 | Succeeded by Sir Robert Abercromby |
| Preceded by The Viscount Lake | Commander-in-Chief, Ireland; 1798–1801 | Succeeded by William Medows |
| Preceded by The Viscount Lake | Commander-in-Chief, India; 1805 | Succeeded by The Viscount Lake |
Honorary titles
| Preceded by The Lord Berkeley of Stratton | Constable of the Tower; Lord Lieutenant of the Tower Hamlets; 1771–1784 | Succeeded by Lord George Lennox |
| Preceded by Lord George Lennox | Constable of the Tower; Lord Lieutenant of the Tower Hamlets; 1784–1805 | Succeeded by The Earl of Moira |
Peerage of Great Britain
| New creation | Marquess Cornwallis; 1792–1805 | Succeeded by Charles Cornwallis |
| Preceded by Charles Cornwallis | Earl Cornwallis; 1762–1805 | Succeeded by Charles Cornwallis |
