= James Mann, 5th Earl Cornwallis =

British politician

James Mann, 5th Earl Cornwallis (20 September 1778 – 21 May 1852), known as James Cornwallis until 1814 and as James Mann between 1814 and 1823 and styled Viscount Brome between 1823 and 1824, was a British peer and Tory politician.

== Background and education ==
Born James Cornwallis, he was the only son of the Right Reverend James Cornwallis, 4th Earl Cornwallis, Bishop of Lichfield and Coventry, by Catherine, third daughter of Galfridus Mann, of Boughton Place, Boughton Malherbe, Kent, and sister of Sir Horatio Mann, 2nd Baronet. Charles Cornwallis, 1st Marquess Cornwallis, and Sir William Cornwallis were his uncles. He was educated at Eton and St John's College, Cambridge, where he received his M.A. in 1798.

== Political career ==
Cornwallis was returned to parliament as one of two representatives for Eye in 1798 (alongside his uncle Sir William Cornwallis), a seat he held until November 1806. He was re-elected for the same constituency again in January 1807, but this time only held the seat until May of the same year. After succeeding to the estates of his maternal uncle in 1814, he assumed by Royal licence the surname of Mann in lieu of Cornwallis. He became known by the courtesy title Viscount Brome in 1823 after his father succeeded in the earldom of Cornwallis. In the following year, he himself succeeded in the earldom and took his seat in the House of Lords.

== Family ==
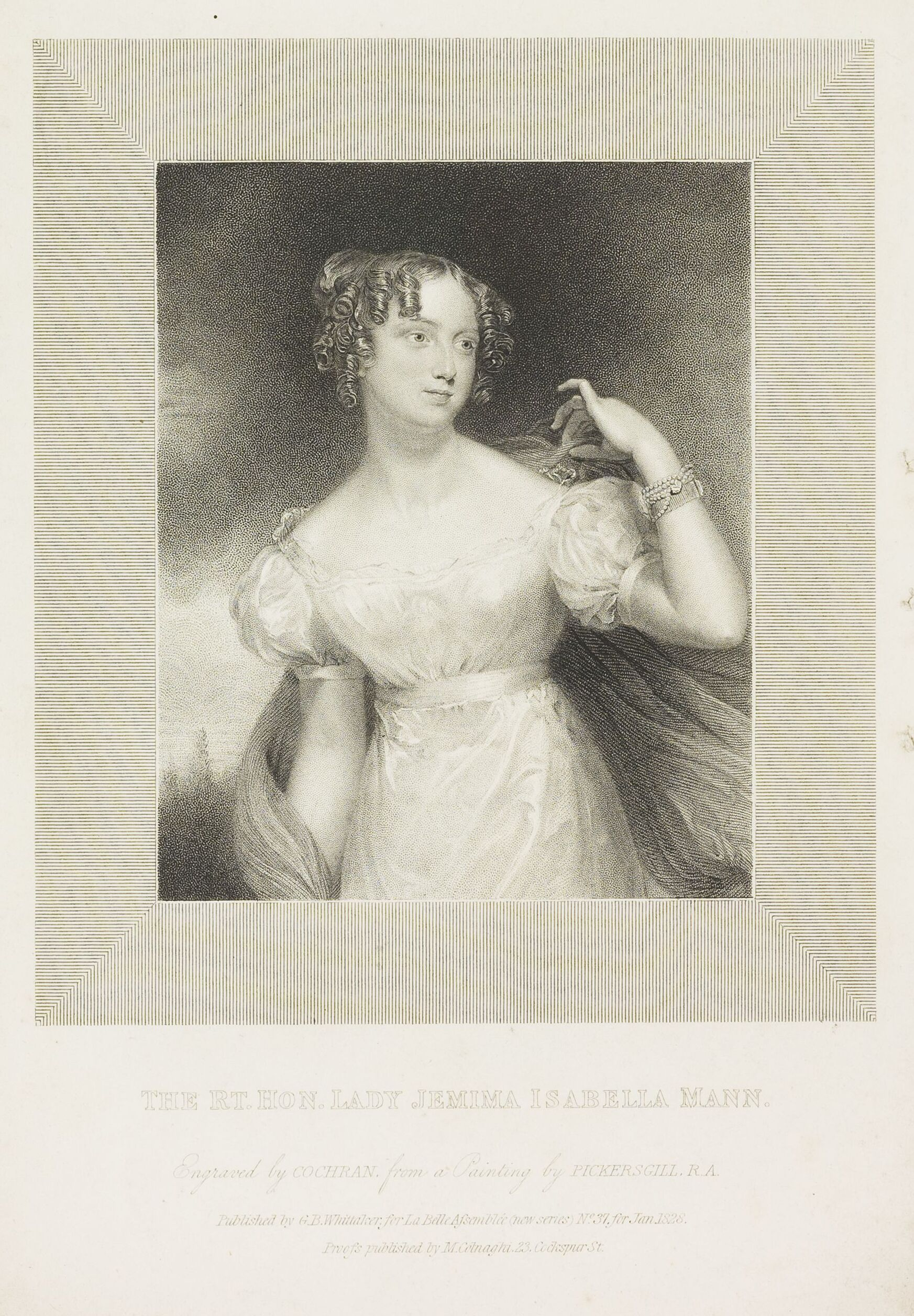
Daughter Jemima Isabella Mann

Lord Cornwallis was married three times. He married firstly Maria Isabella, daughter of Francis Dickens, in 1804. After his first wife's death, he married secondly Laura, daughter of William Hayes, in 1829. After his second wife's death, he married thirdly Julia, daughter of Thomas Bacon of Redlands House at Reading in Berkshire, in 1842. She was the niece of the industrialist, Anthony Bushby Bacon and the aunt of Admiral Reginald Bacon. There were children from the first and third marriages. Lord Cornwallis died in May 1852, aged 73. His only son had died unmarried at the age of 22 and the titles consequently became extinct on his death.

Cornwallis's daughter from his first marriage, Lady Jemima Isabella, married Charles Wykeham Martin. Their son Fiennes assumed the surname of Cornwallis in lieu of his family name in accordance with the will of Caroline Cornwallis. The Cornwallis title was revived in 1927 when Fiennes's son and namesake Fiennes Cornwallis was made Baron Cornwallis.

== See also ==
- Linton Park, his estate at Linton, Kent

Parliament of Great Britain
| Preceded by Hon. Sir William Cornwallis; Mark Singleton | Member of Parliament for Eye; 1799–1801; With: Hon. Sir William Cornwallis | Succeeded by Parliament of the United Kingdom |
Parliament of the United Kingdom
| Preceded by Parliament of Great Britain | Member of Parliament for Eye; 1801–1806; With: Hon. Sir William Cornwallis | Succeeded by Hon. Sir William Cornwallis; Marquess of Huntly |
| Preceded by Hon. Sir William Cornwallis; Marquess of Huntly | Member of Parliament for Eye; January–May 1807; With: Marquess of Huntly January–April 1807; Hon. Henry Wellesley April–May 1807 | Succeeded by Hon. Henry Wellesley; Mark Singleton |
Peerage of Great Britain
| Preceded by James Cornwallis | Earl Cornwallis; 1824–1852 | Extinct |
