= Charles Cornwallis, 4th Baron Cornwallis =

British politician (1675–1722)

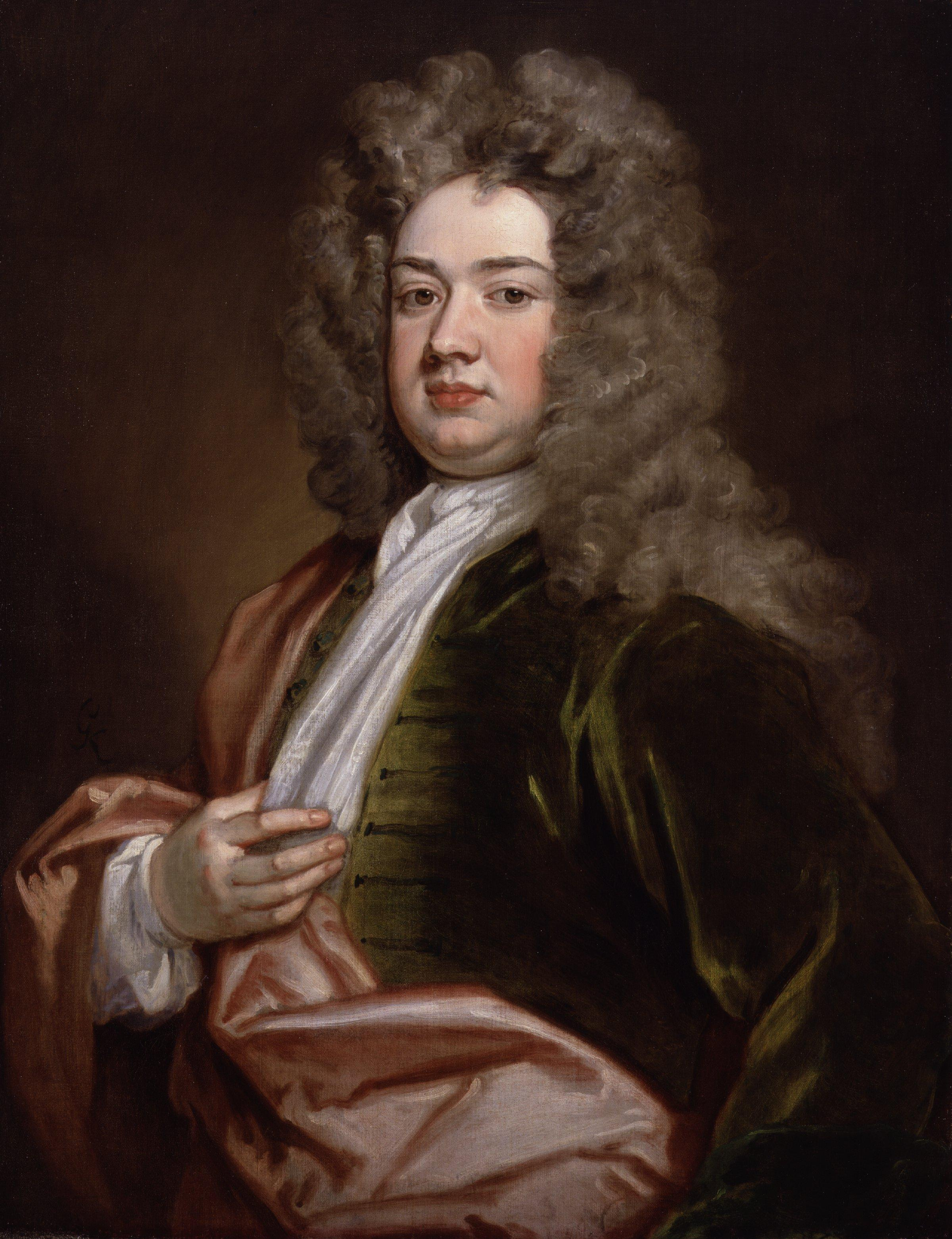
c. 1705–1715 portrait of Cornwallis by Sir Godfrey Kneller

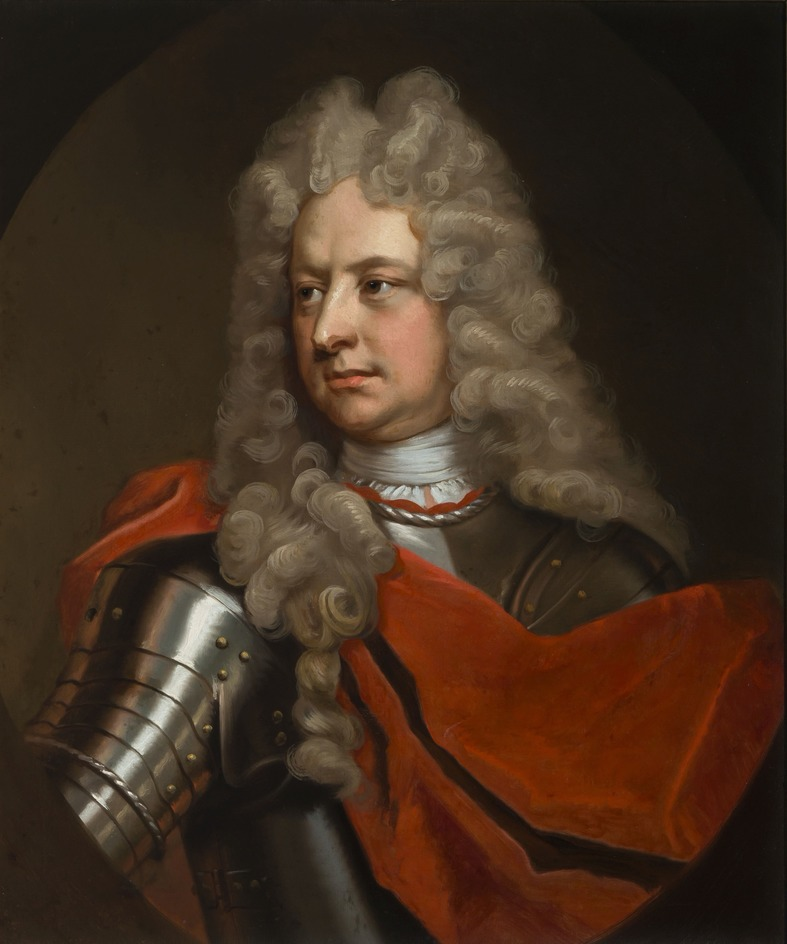
Possible portrait of Cornwallis by Michael Dahl

Charles Cornwallis, 4th Baron Cornwallis, PC (c. 1675–20 January 1722) was a British soldier, later a member of both Houses of Parliament. He served as Joint Postmaster-General and then Paymaster of the Forces. He was appointed to the Privy Council shortly before his death.

== Early life and family ==
Charles Cornwallis was born c. 1675, eldest son of Charles Cornwallis, 3rd Baron Cornwallis (c. 1655–1698) and Elizabeth Fox (c. 1654–1681). (Note: No record of birth or baptism has been found. The date of birth can be calculated from the 26 May 1699 application for a marriage licence where Cornwallis's age is given as 24. Assuming that the declared age is accurate, Cornwallis was born between 26 May 1675-25 May 1676.) He succeeded as Baron Cornwallis on the death of his father on 29 April 1698. On 6 June 1699, he married Charlotte Butler, daughter and sole heir of Richard Butler, 1st Earl of Arran and his second wife, Dorothy Ferrers. They had twelve children:

- Charles (29 March 1700–23 June 1762)
- James (16 September 1701–28 May 1727)
- Stephen (23 December 1702–12 May 1743)
- Charlotte (bap. 11 November 1704–22 April 1705)
- John (23 December 1705–9 June 1768)
- Richard (20 September 1708–10 February 1741)
- Elizabeth (24 March 1710–bur. 8 April 1710)
- Mary (23 June 1711–9 July 1756)
- Edward (5 March 1713–14 January 1776) and Frederick (5 March 1713–19 March 1783)
- William (12 March 1714–c. 1716)
- Henry (21 May 1715–bur. 28 February 1735)

Cornwallis died on 20 January 1722 from long-standing "Gout in his Stomach” at his London home in Bond Street. He was buried at St Mary's church at Culford Hall, Suffolk on 25 January 1722.

== Education and career ==
Charles Cornwallis was recorded as being at Eton in 1690.

By 1694, he was a Captain in the 4th Royal Irish Dragoon Guards leaving on 15 May 1697, thus taking part in the regiment’s contribution to the Nine Years' War. On 23 April 1697, he was granted a royal pension of £1,000 to be paid annually on Lady Day from 1701 for a period of 21 years. Between 1695 and 1698, he sat as Member of Parliament for Eye, generally allied with the Whig faction. He was elevated to the House of Lords on the death of his father (29 April 1698) and also occupied the office of Lord-Lieutenant of Suffolk from 14 June 1698 to 16 June 1703. He did not hold office during the reign of Queen Anne. He found favour on the accession of George I, being appointed Joint Postmaster-General (with James Craggs the Elder) on 9 March 1715. He was replaced as Postmaster-General in 1721 by Edward Carteret, becoming Paymaster of the Forces succeeding Robert Walpole, a post which he held until his death. He was made a Privy Councillor in June 1721, being sworn in at the same time as James Brydges, Duke of Chandos.

== Ancestry ==
Ancestors of Charles Cornwallis, 4th Baron Cornwallis

4. Charles Cornwallis, 2nd Baron Cornwallis
2. Charles Cornwallis, 3rd Baron Cornwallis
5. Margaret Playsted
1. Charles Cornwallis, 4th Baron Cornwallis
6. Sir Stephen Fox
3. Elizabeth Fox
7. Elizabeth Whittle

== Bibliography ==
- Mosley, Charles, ed. (2003). Burke's Peerage, Baronetage & Knightage. Vol. 1 (107th ed.). Genealogical Books.

Parliament of Great Britain
Preceded by Henry Poley; Thomas Davenant	Member of Parliament for Eye; 1695–1698; With: Thomas Davenant 1690–1695; Sir Joseph Jekyll 1697–1710	Succeeded by Sir Joseph Jekyll; Spencer Compton
Political offices
Preceded by Sir John Evelyn, Bt; Sir Thomas Frankland, Bt	Postmaster-General; 1715–1721; With: James Craggs the Elder	Succeeded by Edward Harrison; Edward Carteret
Preceded by Robert Walpole	Paymaster of the Forces; 1721– 1722	Succeeded by The Earl of Wilmington
Honorary titles
Preceded by The Lord Cornwallis	Lord Lieutenant of Suffolk; 1698–1703	Succeeded by The Earl of Dysart
Peerage of England
Preceded by Charles Cornwallis	Baron Cornwallis; 1698–1722	Succeeded by Charles Cornwallis
