= Elizabeth Richardson, 1st Lady Cramond =

English writer and noble

Elizabeth Richardson, 1st Lady Cramond (1576/77 – 1651) was an English writer and peeress. She is remembered for her collections of prayers.

== Biography ==
Born Elizabeth Beaumont, she was the eldest child of Sir Thomas Beaumont (brother of Huntingdon Beaumont) and his wife, Catherine. On 27 November 1594 she married John Ashburnham (knighted in 1604) at Stoughton, Leicestershire, and they had ten children including John Ashburnham (MP). Their daughter, Elizabeth, was the first wife of Frederick Cornwallis, 1st Baron Cornwallis.

Sir John's death in 1620 left the family in financial difficulty, but Lady Ashburnham was considerably influential at court due to Mary Villiers, Countess of Buckingham (mother of King James's favourite, George Villiers, 1st Duke of Buckingham) being her cousin. She procured a baronetcy for her son-in-law, Edward Dering, in 1627 and a letter to Buckingham, that year, indicates she enjoyed the company of his wife, Katherine, of Lady Carlisle and of Queen Henrietta Maria.

On 14 December 1626 Lady Ashburnham married Sir Thomas Richardson (later Lord Chief Justice of England and Wales) at St Giles in the Fields. Through his influence, she was created Lady Cramond in the Peerage of Scotland, on 29 February 1628 (with a special remainder to her stepson, Thomas and the issue of his body), an event which elicited 'many gibes and pasquinades...for the amusement of Westminster Hall'. On 9 September 1629, she was granted an annual pension of £300 for the duration of her life.

== Works ==
Lady Cramond wrote A Ladies Legacie to her Daughters, a collection of prayers in three parts, written in 1625, 1635, and 1645. She had originally started writing in 1606 when she wrote Instructions for my children or any other Christian.

== Family ==
Lady Cramond died in 1651 and was buried next to her first husband on 3 April that year, at St Andrew, Holborn. Her stepson having died in her lifetime, her title passed to his son, Thomas.

She was the grandmother of Charles Cornwallis, 2nd Baron Cornwallis.

== Notes and references ==
- Victoria E. Burke, Richardson, Elizabeth, suo jure baroness of [sic] Cramond (1576/7–1651), Oxford Dictionary of National Biography, Oxford University Press, 2004 accessed 18 November 2007

Peerage of Scotland
New creation	Lady Cramond; 1628–1651	Succeeded by Thomas Richardson
