= Thomas Davenant =

Thomas Davenant (died 1697), was an English Member of Parliament (MP).

He was a Member of the Parliament of England for Eye 1690 to 1697.
