= Charles Cornwallis, 2nd Marquess Cornwallis =

British politician

The Most Honourable The Marquess Cornwallis

Master of the Buckhounds
- In office 13 May 1807 – 9 August 1823
- Monarchs: George III; George IV
- Prime Minister: The Duke of Portland; Spencer Perceval; The Earl of Liverpool
- Preceded by: The Earl of Albemarle
- Succeeded by: The Lord Maryborough

Personal details
- Born: 19 October 1774
- Died: 9 August 1823 (aged 48)
- Spouse: Lady Louisa Gordon
- Education: St John's College, Cambridge

Charles Cornwallis, 2nd Marquess Cornwallis (19 October 1774 – 9 August 1823), styled Viscount Brome until 1805, was a British Tory politician. He served as Master of the Buckhounds between 1807 and 1823.

== Background ==
Cornwallis was the only son of General Charles Cornwallis, 1st Marquess Cornwallis, by his wife Jemima (née Jones). His mother died when he was four years old. He was educated at Eton and St John's College, Cambridge, receiving his M.A. in 1795.

== Career ==
In 1795 Cornwallis was returned to parliament as one of two representatives for Eye (alongside his uncle William Cornwallis), a seat he held until 1796. He then sat as a Knight of the Shire for Suffolk until 1805, when he succeeded his father in the marquessate and entered the House of Lords. In 1807 he was appointed Master of the Buckhounds, a post he held until his death fourteen years later.

On 26 May 1803 he was appointed Colonel of the East Suffolk Militia, and continued in command until his death.

== Family ==
Lord Cornwallis married Lady Louisa Gordon (27 December 1776–5 December 1850), daughter of Alexander Gordon, 4th Duke of Gordon, on 17 April 1797. They had five daughters, including Lady Jane Cornwallis, wife of Richard Griffin, 3rd Baron Braybrooke, and Lady Jemima Cornwallis, wife of Edward Eliot, 3rd Earl of St Germans. He died in August 1823, aged 48. The marquessate became extinct on his death while he was succeeded in his remaining titles by his uncle, the Right Reverend James Cornwallis.

Parliament of Great Britain
Preceded by Hon. William Cornwallis; Peter Bathurst	Member of Parliament for Eye; 1795–1796; With: Hon. William Cornwallis	Succeeded by Hon. William Cornwallis; Mark Singleton
Preceded by Sir John Rous, Bt; Sir Charles Bunbury, Bt	Member of Parliament for Suffolk; 1796–1801; With: Sir Charles Bunbury, Bt	Succeeded by Parliament of the United Kingdom
Parliament of the United Kingdom
Preceded by Parliament of Great Britain	Member of Parliament for Suffolk; 1801–1805; With: Sir Charles Bunbury, Bt	Succeeded by Sir Charles Bunbury, Bt; Thomas Gooch
Political offices
Preceded by The Earl of Albemarle	Master of the Buckhounds; 1806–1823	Succeeded by The Lord Maryborough
Peerage of Great Britain
Preceded by Charles Cornwallis	Marquess Cornwallis; 1805–1823	Extinct
Preceded by Charles Cornwallis	Earl Cornwallis; 1805–1823	Succeeded by James Cornwallis
