= Frederick Cornwallis, 1st Baron Cornwallis =

English peer

The Right Honourable The Lord Cornwallis Kt PC
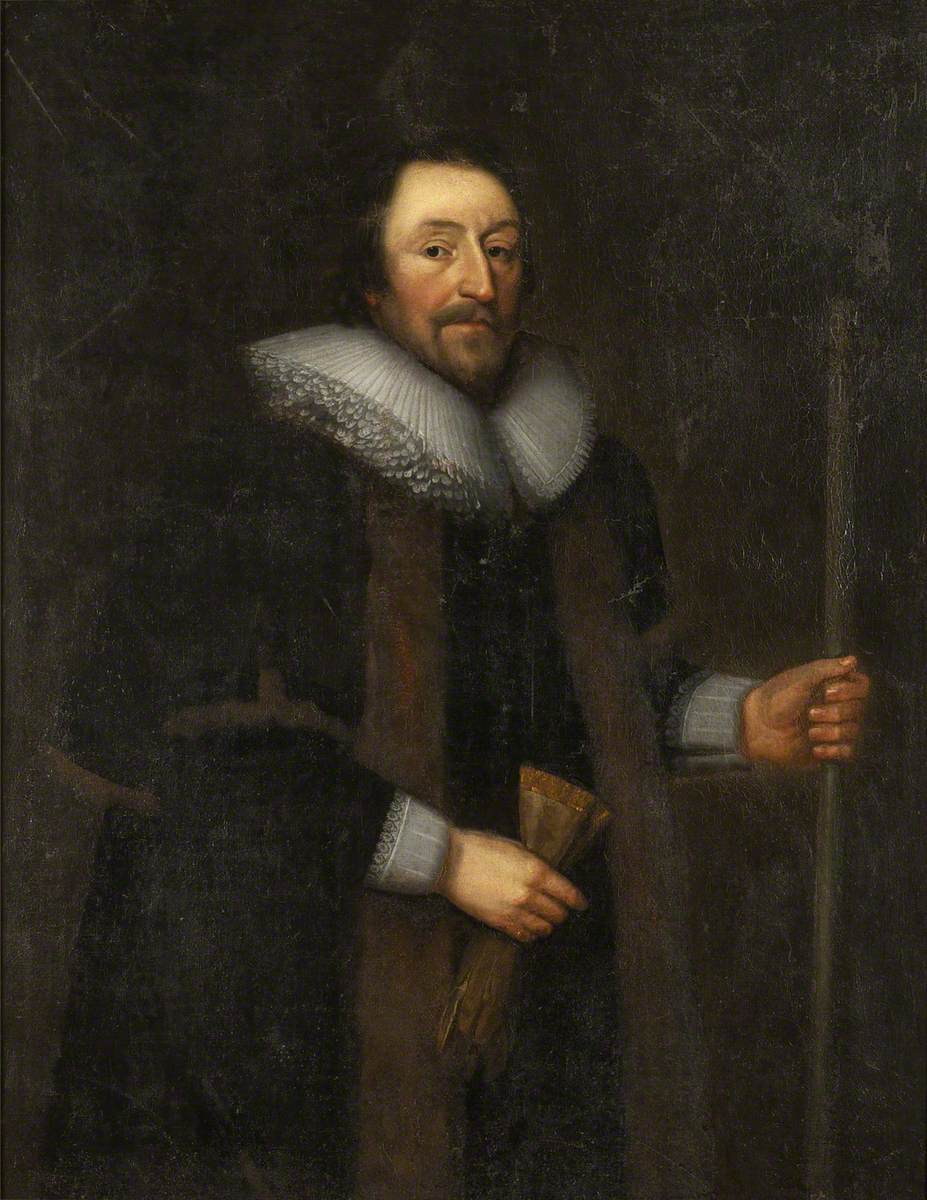

Treasurer of the Household
- In office 1660–1662
- Preceded by: Viscount Savile
- Succeeded by: Viscount Fitzhardinge

Privy Counsellor
- In office 9 September 1660 – January 1662

Personal details
- Born: 1610
- Died: January 1662 (aged 51–52)

Frederick Cornwallis, 1st Baron Cornwallis (14 March 1610/1 – January 1662) was an English peer, MP and Privy Counsellor. He was Treasurer of the Household 1660–1662. He was the eldest surviving son of Sir William Cornwallis of Brome, Suffolk, and his second wife, Jane. After his father's death, his mother married Sir Nathaniel Bacon.

== Family ==
Cornwallis married twice.

He married firstly: Elizabeth Ashburnham, the daughter of Sir John Ashburnham (of Ashburnham, Sussex) and Elizabeth Richardson, 1st Lady Cramond, with 3 sons and a daughter, of whom only Charles Cornwallis, 2nd Baron Cornwallis survived him.

After the wedding, in January 1631, King Charles I, Henrietta Maria and Susan Feilding, Countess of Denbigh wrote to congratulate his mother Jane, Lady Cornwallis Bacon, and ask her to forgive him for his disobedience and return him to her favour. Denbigh said Ashburnham was her cousin "though her family be unfortunate".

Elizabeth died c. February 1643.

He married secondly: Elizabeth Crofts, daughter of Sir Henry Crofts (of Little Saxham), with whom he had a daughter.

== Death and legacy ==
In January 1662, Cornwallis died suddenly of apoplexy. Samuel Pepys recorded his death in the famous Diary, and described him as a "bold, profane-talking man". Another contemporary source described him as "a man of so cheerful a spirit that no sorrow came next his heart, and of so resolved a mind that no fear came into his thoughts".

Parliament of England
Preceded by No Parliament	Member of Parliament for Eye; March 1640 – September 1642; With: Sir Roger North	Succeeded by Morris Barrow and Sir Roger North
Preceded by Nathaniel Bacon and Francis Bacon	Member of Parliament for Ipswich; 1660–1660; With: Francis Bacon	Succeeded by John Sicklemore and William Blois
Political offices
Vacant during English Republic Title last held by Viscount Savile	Treasurer of the Household; 1660 – January 1662	Succeeded by Viscount Fitzhardinge
Peerage of England
New creation	Baron Cornwallis; 1661 – January 1662	Succeeded by Charles Cornwallis
Baronetage of England
New creation	Baronet; 1627 – January 1662	Succeeded by Charles Cornwallis
