= Charles Cornwallis, 2nd Baron Cornwallis =

English landowner and politician

The Lord Cornwallis
- In office 1660–1662
- Preceded by: Frederick Cornwallis
- Succeeded by: Charles Cornwallis

Charles Cornwallis, 2nd Baron Cornwallis of Eye (1632 – 13 April 1673) was an English landowner and politician who sat in the House of Commons from 1660 to 1662 when he inherited the peerage as Baron Cornwallis.

== Early years ==
Cornwallis was born in Culford, Suffolk, the son of Sir Frederick Cornwallis, 1st Baron Cornwallis and his wife Elizabeth Ashburnham, daughter of Sir John Ashburnham and Elizabeth Richardson, 1st Lady Cramond, and was baptised on 19 April 1632. His uncle was John Ashburnham. His paternal grandparents were Sir William Cornwallis and Jane Meautys (died 1 July 1627). Cornwallis's parents lived much of the time in London, his father being a Royalist and an Equerry to Charles I, while his mother was a Lady-in-Waiting to the Queen.

With his parents busy at Court, Cornwallis and his three siblings were raised at Culford Hall by their grandmother, Lady Jane, who was by then married to her second husband, Sir Nathaniel Bacon. Their home, Culford Hall, had been built by Lady Jane's father-in-law, Sir Nicholas Bacon, 1st Baronet. It is through Lady Jane that Culford Hall eventually passed from Bacon to Frederick, becoming home to the Earls of Cornwallis.

== Career ==
In April 1660, Cornwallis was elected Member of Parliament for Eye in the Convention Parliament. He was created Knight of the Bath on 23 April 1661. In 1661 he was re-elected MP for Eye in the Cavalier Parliament and sat until 1662 when on the death of his father he inherited the peerage. He became J.P. in 1662 and as county magistrate, he was one of the appointees at the assize who oversaw a test of accused women in the Lowestoft Witch Trial.

Cornwallis died aged 41, and was buried at Culford.. His death was attributed to a gastric disorder. In the days before his death he was treated by a Mr Easton who had been recommended to Cornwallis. although Easton was not a physician. Later, an unnamed physician was consulted who disagreed with Easton’s course of treatment and took over Cornwallis’s treatment in his final hours which included bleeding shortly before Cornwallis died. Mr Easton felt that his professional competence had been maligned. Shortly afterwards, an anonymous account of the death was published "for common satisfaction. And for the necessary vindication of Mr. Easton, from those calumnies that are spread about the town". This gave a very detailed account of Cornwallis’s symptoms and their treatments in the last few days of his life.

== Family ==
At age 19, Cornwallis married Margaret Playsted (died 1668), daughter of Sir Thomas Playsted of Arlington, East Sussex. They had eleven children but, as their eldest two sons died young, their son Charles succeeded to the title. He is buried under a monument in St. Mary's Church, Culford. St. Mary's Church was built by their daughter-in-law Elizabeth's father, Sir Stephen Fox.

Parliament of England
Preceded by Not represented in Rump Parliament	Member of Parliament for Eye; 1660–1662; With: Sir George Reeve, 1st Baronet	Succeeded by Charles Cornwallis; Sir George Reeve, 1st Baronet
Peerage of England
Preceded by Frederick Cornwallis	Baron Cornwallis; 1662–1673	Succeeded by Charles Cornwallis
