= Frederick Cornwallis =

Archbishop of Canterbury from 1768 to 1783

The Most Reverend and Right Honourable Frederick Cornwallis
- Archbishop of Canterbury
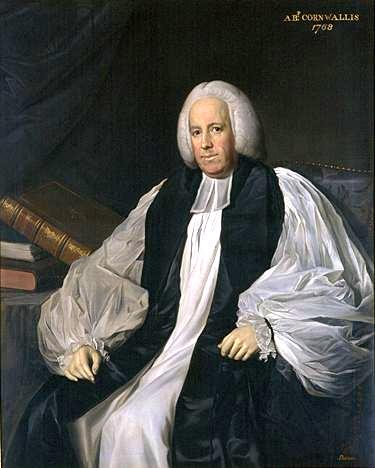
- Portrait by Nathaniel Dance-Holland
- Church: Church of England
- Diocese: Canterbury
- In office: 1768–1783
- Predecessor: Thomas Secker
- Successor: John Moore
- Previous post: Bishop of Lichfield (1750–1768)

Orders
- Consecration: 19 February 1750 by Thomas Herring

Personal details
- Born: 5 March 1713 London, England
- Died: 19 March 1783 (aged 70) Lambeth, London, England
- Buried: Church of St Mary-at-Lambeth
- Denomination: Anglican
- Education: Christ's College, Cambridge

Frederick Cornwallis (5 March 1713 – 19 March 1783) was a British clergy member who served as Archbishop of Canterbury after a career in the Church of England. He was born the seventh son of an aristocratic family.

== Early life and education ==
Cornwallis was born in London, England, the seventh son of Charles Cornwallis, 4th Baron Cornwallis. His twin brother, Edward Cornwallis, was born sixth. Charles was educated at Eton College and graduated from Christ's College, Cambridge. He was ordained a priest in 1742 and became a Doctor of Divinity in 1748.

== Career ==
Cornwallis was able to ascend quickly in the Church thanks to his aristocratic connections. In 1746, he was made chaplain to King George II and a canon of Windsor. In 1750, he became a canon at St Paul's Cathedral, and later that year became Bishop of Lichfield and Coventry thanks to the patronage of the Duke of Newcastle, who was Secretary of State. Cornwallis was also Dean of Windsor (1765–1768) and Dean of St Paul's (1766–1768).

On the death of Thomas Secker in 1768, Cornwallis's friendship with the prime minister, the Duke of Grafton, resulted in his translation to Archbishop of Canterbury. As archbishop, his sociability and geniality made him popular. He was a consistent supporter of the administration of Lord North and led efforts in support of Anglican clergy who were dispossessed of their livings in the Thirteen Colonies during the American Revolution. He was buried at St. Mary's Church, Lambeth.

On the whole, Cornwallis has generally been judged as a competent administrator but an uninspiring leader of the 18th-century church. He is considered a typical product of the time's latitudinarianism, whose lack of zeal paved the way for the differing responses of both the Evangelicals and the Oxford Movement in the early 19th century.

== Family ==
His twin brother, Edward Cornwallis, had a military career by becoming a general in the British Army; twice serving as a military governor of colonies; and founding Halifax, Nova Scotia, in 1749.

His nephew was Charles Cornwallis, 1st Marquess Cornwallis, a British general during the American Revolution who surrendered his forces at Yorktown, Virginia, and was later appointed Governor-General of India.

== Discovery of likely coffin ==
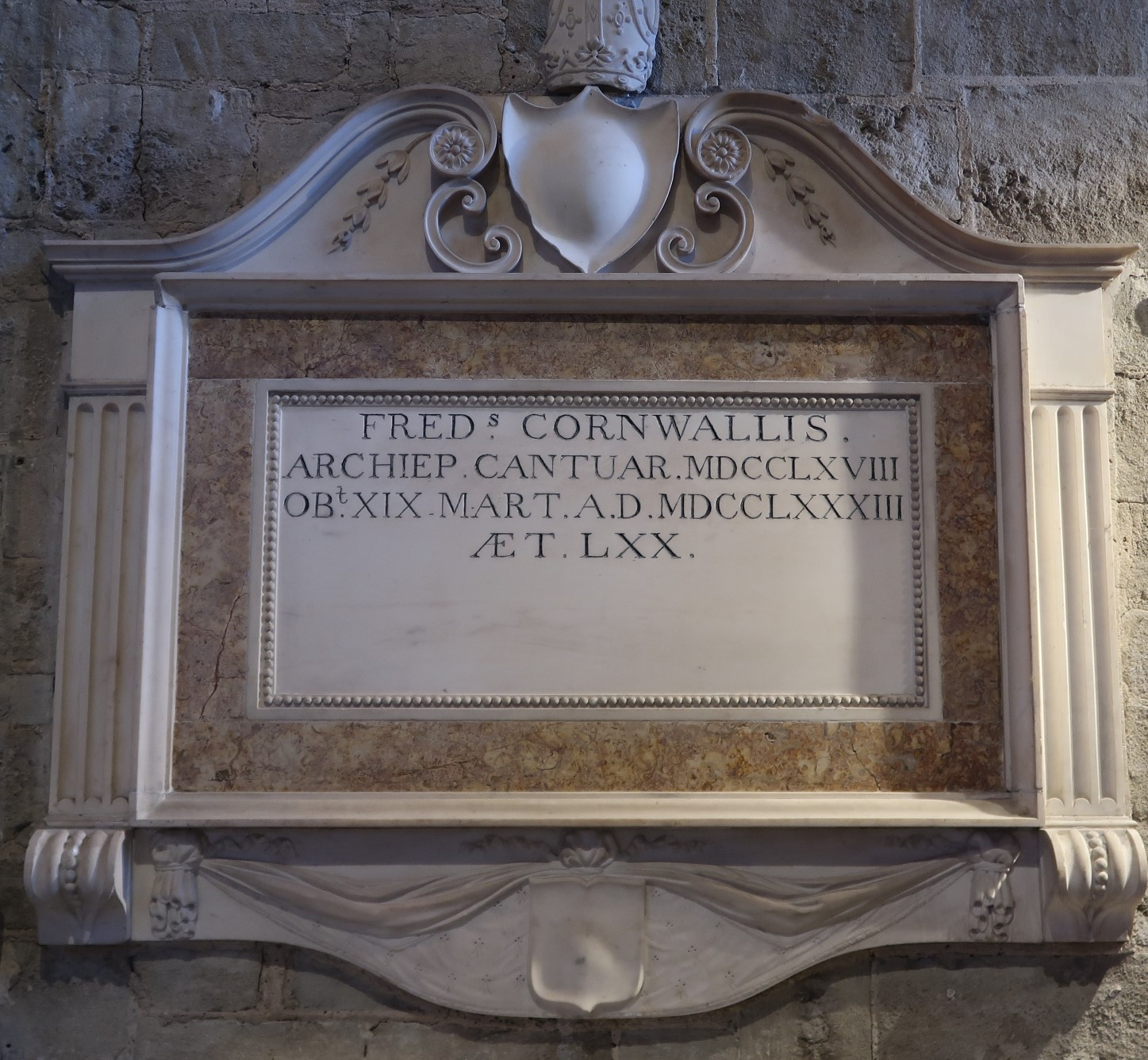
Wall plaque in the deconsecrated church of St Mary-at-Lambeth to Frederick Cornwallis, who was buried nearby

In 2016, during the refurbishment of the Garden Museum, which is housed at the medieval church of St Mary-at-Lambeth, 30 lead coffins were found under the church floor. One had an archbishop's red and gold mitre on top of it. Two archbishops were identified from nameplates on their coffins. Church records document that three additional archbishops, including Cornwallis, are likely to be buried in the vault.

== Arms ==
Coat of arms of Frederick Cornwallis

Escutcheon
Sable guttee d’eau on a fess Argent three Cornish choughs.
Motto
When Cornwallis was serving as a bishop his arms would be displayed impaled with the arms of the diocese and topped with a mitre.

Church of England titles
Preceded by Richard Smalbroke	Bishop of Lichfield; 1750–1768	Succeeded by John Egerton
Preceded by Thomas Secker	Archbishop of Canterbury; 1768–1783	Succeeded by John Moore
