= Charles Cornwallis, 3rd Baron Cornwallis =

British politician

Charles Cornwallis, 3rd Baron Cornwallis PC (28 December 1655 – 29 April 1698) was an English politician who served as First Lord of the Admiralty and Lord Lieutenant of Suffolk, in which capacity he personally served as Colonel of the Suffolk Militia Horse in 1692. He succeeded his father Charles Cornwallis, 2nd Baron Cornwallis as Baron Cornwallis in 1673. On 27 December that year, at Westminster Abbey, he married Elizabeth Fox (d. 28 February 1681 in Tunbridge Wells), daughter of Sir Stephen Fox. They had four sons:

- Charles, 4th Baron Cornwallis (1675–20 January 1722)
- William (?-9 May 1679)
- James (?-30 May 1680)
- John (?-before 1698) (Note: John Cornwallis is not mentioned in his father's will and thus it is probable that he had died before the will was written on 9 October 1697.)

After Elizabeth's death, on 6 May 1688 he married Anne Scott, 1st Duchess of Buccleuch, widow of James Scott, 1st Duke of Monmouth, with whom she later had three children: (Note: As the Duchess of Buccleuch. Lady Anne Scott was an heiress in her own right, so all of her children took her surname.)

- Lady Anne Scott (bap. 27 April 1690-buried 25 July 1690)
- Lord George Scott (23 September 1692–buried 27 May 1693)
- Lady Isabella Scott (27 April 1694-18 February 1748)

Cornwallis's financial situation on succeeding to the barony was dire. The situation was eased by the sale of properties at Waburne [Weybourne], Hemblington and Panxford in Norfolk and Little Bradley in Suffolk to his father-in-law, Sir Stephen Fox. As part of the marriage settlement granted by Sir Stephen on the marriage of his daughter, Elizabeth, to Cornwallis, on the death of Sir Stephen Fox these properties reverted to Charles Cornwallis, 4th Baron Cornwallis.

Cornwallis was tried by a panel of thirty-five of his peers on a charge of murder. It was alleged that, during a drunken altercation at the Palace of Whitehall in the early hours of 18 May 1679, Cornwallis’s companion, Charles Gerrard, had assaulted and killed a passing messenger boy, Robert Clerk, who had become involved in the altercation. Although Cornwallis had not struck Clerk, both Gerrard and Cornwallis had made threats to kill the sentry and had threatened him with their swords. It was alleged that Cornwallis was equally guilty because he had intended to carry through the murder as much as Gerrard intended to commit murder. His peers unanimously found him not guilty although six believed him guilty of manslaughter.

== Notes ==
Political offices
Preceded by The Earl of Pembroke and Montgomery	First Lord of the Admiralty; 1692–1693	Succeeded by The Viscount Falkland
Honorary titles
Preceded by The Duke of Grafton	Lord Lieutenant of Suffolk; 1689–1698	Succeeded by The Lord Cornwallis
Peerage of England
Preceded by Charles Cornwallis	Baron Cornwallis; 1673–1698	Succeeded by Charles Cornwallis
