= Oswald Cornwallis =

English cricketer and Royal Navy officer

Captain The Honourable Oswald Cornwallis OBE
- Born: 16 March 1894; Linton Park, Kent
- Died: 28 January 1974 (aged 79); Froxfield, Hampshire
- Military career
- Allegiance: United Kingdom
- Branch: Royal Navy
- Service years: 1911–1944
- Rank: Captain
- Commands: HMS Scarborough
- Awards: Officer of the Most Excellent Order of the British Empire

Oswald Wykeham Cornwallis OBE (16 March 1894 – 28 January 1974) was an English Royal Navy officer and amateur cricketer. He was born in 1894 at Linton Park in Kent, the third son of Mabel and Fiennes Cornwallis. His father was the Member of Parliament for Maidstone and would later become a peer. He served in both the First and Second World Wars.

Cornwallis served in the Navy in both world wars, rising to the rank of captain. He played first-class cricket for the Navy between 1920 and 1926.

== Naval career ==
Cornwallis was educated at Royal Naval College, Osborne and Royal Naval College, Dartmouth before being commissioned in the Royal Navy as a Midshipman in 1911. He served during the First World War, rising to the rank of lieutenant during the war, and was awarded an OBE in 1919 as a result of his war service on HMS Caroline in the 4th Light Cruiser Squadron. After the war he was promoted to lieutenant commander and then, in 1928, to commander and took command of HMS Scarborough between 1933 and 1935.

At the beginning of the Second World War, Cornwallis was serving in the Admiralty in Southampton as liaison officer for the Royal Naval Reserve and Merchant Navy. During the war he served as the deputy director of Naval Equipment, stationed at HMS President in London. He retired from the navy with the rank of captain in 1944.

== Cricket career ==
Oswald Cornwallis
Personal information
- Batting: Right-handed
- Relatives: Fiennes Cornwallis (Father); Stanley Cornwallis (Brother)

Domestic team information
- Years: Team
- 1920–1926: Royal Navy
- 1921: Hampshire

Career statistics
Competition	First-class
Matches	4
Runs scored	91
Batting average	15.16
100s/50s	0/0
Top score	31
Catches/stumpings	0/–
- Source: CricInfo, 13 December 2009

Cornwallis made his first-class cricket debut for the Royal Navy against the Army at Lord's in 1920. Cornwallis would play three matches for the Royal Navy, the last of which came against the Army, also at Lord's in 1926.

Cornwallis also represented Hampshire in one first-class match in 1921 against Kent, a match in which his brother Stanley Cornwallis played for Kent. In his only first-class match for the club Cornwallis was absent in both Hampshire's innings. His brother bowled in Hampshire's first innings, but was himself absent for both Kent's innings and Hampshire's second innings. Their absence was allowed following the death of their brother, Captain Fiennes Wykeham Mann Cornwallis who was killed in the Ballyturin House Ambush near Gort in County Galway during the Irish War of Independence by the Irish Republican Army. It is likely that Oswald never actually took to the field for Hampshire.

== Family and later life ==
Cornwallis was the son of Conservative politician and Member of Parliament for Maidstone Fiennes Cornwallis, 1st Baron Cornwallis. His brother Stanley Cornwallis served as a cavalry officer in the First World War and went on to captain Kent County Cricket Club from 1924 to 1926. His oldest brother, Fiennes Cornwallis, was killed in 1921 during the Irish War of Independence.

Cornwallis married Venetia Digby, the daughter of Edward Digby, 10th Baron Digby, in 1923. The couple had three children.

Cornwallis died in Froxfield, Hampshire on 28 January 1974.
