= George Fenner (Kent cricketer) =

English cricketer

Personal information
- Full name: George David Fenner
- Born: 15 November 1896; Linton, Kent
- Died: 14 September 1971 (aged 74); Linton, Kent
- Source: Cricinfo, 10 March 2017

George David Fenner (15 November 1896 – 14 September 1971) was an English cricketer and a prominent cricket coach. He played seven first-class cricket matches between 1925 and 1929 and was the senior professional for the Marylebone Cricket Club (MCC) between 1928 and 1934. He was the first man to be given the title of Head Coach by the MCC.

Fenner was born at Linton in Kent in 1896, the son of David and Ada Fenner. His father worked as a groom and Fenner played his early cricket at Linton Park, owned by the Cornwallis family which was associated with Kent County Cricket Club.

During World War I Fenner served in the Territorial Force as a member of the Royal Army Medical Corps. After the war he worked as a groundsman and was the professional at The Mote Cricket Club in Maidstone. His performances for The Mote brought him to the attention of Kent, and Fenner made his debut for the county's Second XI in 1923 before being employed at the club's Tonbridge Nursery between 1924 and 1927. He played regularly for the Second XI but only made two First XI appearances for Kent, one in each of 1925 and 1927. He also appeared once for H. D. G. Leveson Gower's XI in 1925 in a first-class match. His other four first-class matches were all played for MCC.

In 1928, Fenner was appointed Head Coach for the MCC at Lord's. He was considered one of the best cricket coaches of his day, working at the club until 1934 when he was succeeded by Archie Fowler. He suffered from polio, and the disease ended his professional career. Later in life he was confined to a wheel chair.

Fenner married Harriet Pryer in 1928. The couple had a daughter and a son, Maurice Fenner, who played 33 first-class matches for Kent and the Combined Services cricket team. George Fenner died in 1971 at Linton aged 74.

== Bibliography ==
- Carlaw, Derek (2020). Kent County Cricketers, A to Z: Part Two (1919–1939) (PDF). Cardiff: ACS.
