= Wykeham Cornwallis, 2nd Baron Cornwallis =

English cricketer and British Army officer (1892–1982)

Colonel The Right Honourable The Lord Cornwallis
Personal information
- Full name: Wykeham Stanley Cornwallis, 2nd Baron Cornwallis
- Born: 14 March 1892; Linton, Kent
- Died: 4 January 1982 (aged 89); Fordcombe, Kent
- Batting: Right-handed
- Bowling: Right arm fast

Domestic team information
- Years: Team
- 1919–1926: Kent

Career statistics
Competition	First-class
Matches	106
Runs scored	964
Batting average	11.75
100s/50s	0/1
Top score	91
Balls bowled	6,528
Wickets	118
Bowling average	32.45
5 wickets in innings	5
10 wickets in match	0
Best bowling	6/37
Catches/stumpings	35/–
- Source: CricInfo, 19 July 2009
- Military career
- Allegiance: United Kingdom
- Branch: British Army
- Service years: 1911–1968
- Rank: Colonel
- Unit: Royal Scots Greys
- Conflicts: First World War
- Awards: Knight Commander of the Royal Victorian Order; Knight Commander of the Order of the British Empire; Knight of the Order of St John; Military Cross

Colonel Wykeham Stanley Cornwallis, 2nd Baron Cornwallis KCVO KBE KStJ MC (4 March 1892 – 4 January 1982), was a British peer, cavalry officer and amateur cricketer. He served during the First World War and was later prominent in public life in the county of Kent, holding a range of public offices. He played first-class cricket for Kent County Cricket Club, captaining the team between 1926 and 1928 and succeeded his father Fiennes Cornwallis, 1st Baron Cornwallis as Baron Cornwallis in 1935.

He was Lord Lieutenant of Kent from 1944 to 1972.

== Early life and education ==
Cornwallis was born at Linton Park in Linton in Kent, the second son of Fiennes Cornwallis and his wife Mabel Leigh. He was educated at Ludgrove School, where he captained the cricket team, and at Eton College before going on to the Royal Military College, Sandhurst.

His father was Member of Parliament for Maidstone and later became Chairman of Kent County Council. The hereditary title of Baron Cornwallis was created for him in 1927.

== Military career ==
Cornwallis entered the Royal Military College, Sandhurst in 1910 after taking the Army qualifying exam at Eton College He was appointed as second lieutenant in the Royal Scots Greys in September 1911 and promoted to lieutenant in 1912. He has been described as being "passionate about horses" and won a number of regimental trophies. In the years before the First World War he was stationed at York.

At the start of World War I, the Greys mobilised and immediately departed for France, arriving on 17 August 1914. Cornwallis served with A squadron initially, first engaging the enemy on 22 August near Mons. He fought in the Battle of Mons and the subsequent retreat, during which his horse, White Knight, was killed. In mid-September 1914 Cornwallis was wounded whilst advancing at the First Battle of the Aisne. He was evacuated to England, rejoining his unit in December.

During 1915 Cornwallis was trained in the use of trench mortars and was appointed Bombing Officer. He saw action at the Battle of Neuve Chapelle in March and at the Second Battle of Ypres in April. In early 1916 the Greys were serving near Vermelles when Cornwallis was awarded the Military Cross for leading bombing arrangements whilst under heavy fire following the explosion of a mine at the front line. He was promoted to acting captain in late 1916 and later saw action in the Battle of Arras in 1917 before taking command of C squadron after its commanding officer was wounded.

In the autumn of 1917, Cornwallis was attached to 5th Cavalry Brigade headquarters, with his promotion to captain being confirmed on Christmas Day 1917. In July 1918 he was promoted to General Staff Officer Third Grade and served as a staff officer for the remainder of the war. After the Armistice, he served with the General Staff in Belgium and was appointed as aide de camp to Field Marshal Haig before being Mentioned in Dispatches in July 1919.

After the war, Cornwallis was an instructor at Sandhurst. He retired from the army in 1924, joining the Army Reserve. He succeeded his father as honorary colonel of the Thames and Medway Heavy Brigade, Royal Artillery, holding the appointment from 25 September 1937 until its disbandment in 1956, and was then Hon Col of 5th Battalion, The Buffs, between 1957 and 1967 and its successor, 8th Battalion, The Queen's Regiment, from 1967 to 1968.

== Public life ==
Cornwallis played a prominent role in public life in Kent throughout his life. He became a Justice of the Peace in 1926 and succeeded his father as Baron Cornwallis in 1935, his older brother having died in 1921 during the Irish War of Independence. He was vice-chairman of Kent County Council between 1931 and 1935, then chairman between 1935 and 1936, when he was elected a County Alderman. In 1944 he became Lord Lieutenant of Kent, a role he held until 1972, and was the first Pro-Chancellor of the University of Kent.

The Cornwallis family were closely associated with Freemasonry in Kent. Cornwallis succeeded his father as Provincial Grand Master of Kent in 1935 until the county was divided into East and West Kent in 1973. He then served as Provincial Grand Master of East Kent until his death in 1982. The organisation's main charity is named after the Cornwallis family and was established following the death of the first Baron in 1935. Cornwallis' son, Fiennes Neil Wykeham Cornwallis, 3rd Baron Cornwallis, was Pro Grand Master of United Grand Lodge of England between 1982 and 1992.

== Cricket career ==
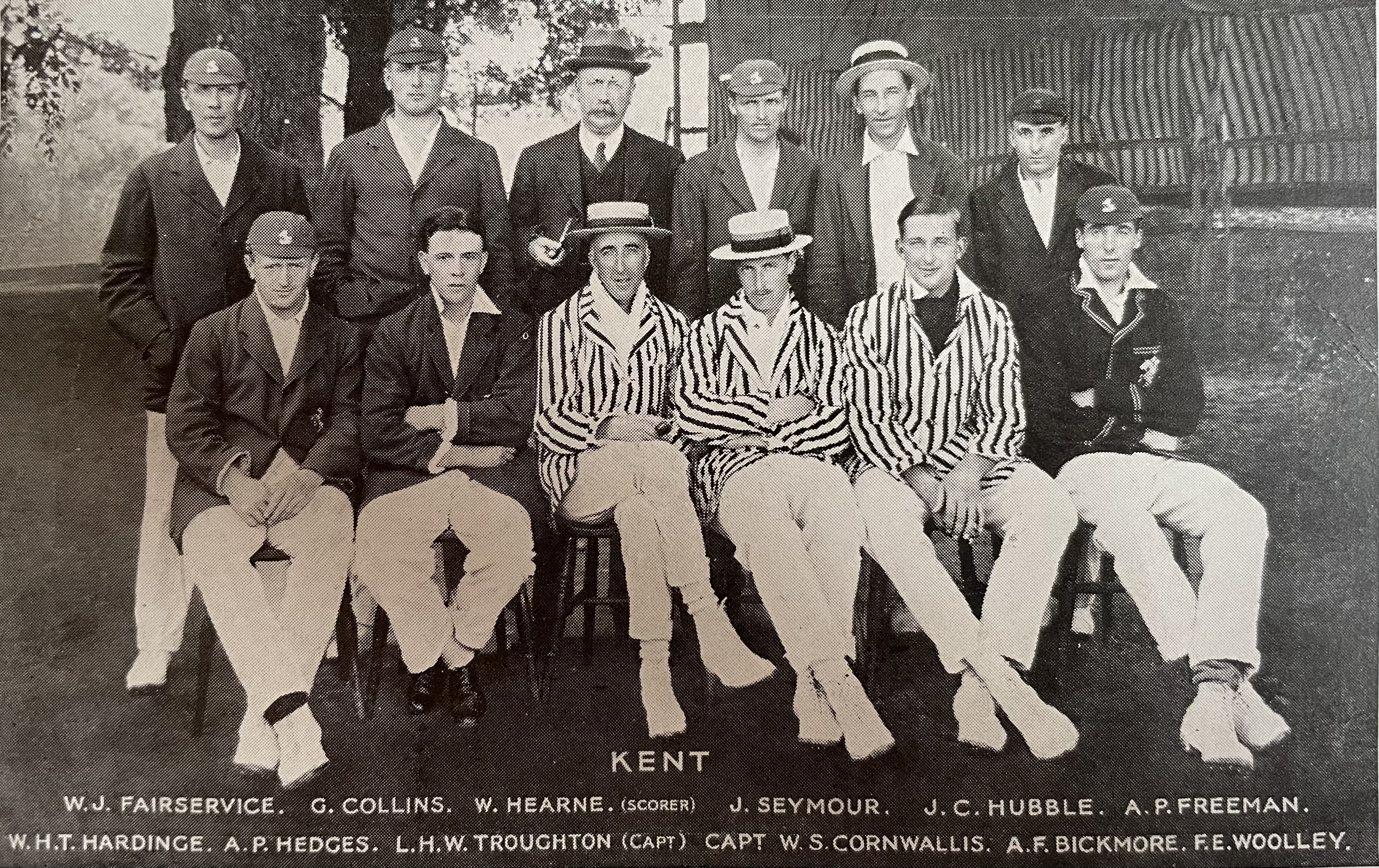
Cornwallis with the Kent team of about 1922

Cornwallis was serving under Field Marshal Haig when he played in a charity cricket match, taking a hat-trick. He was later invited by C. H. B. Marsham to play for Kent County Cricket Club against Sussex in the 1919 County Championship. Cornwallis, who had not played cricket since school, initially laughed off the invitation but was told by Haig to accept – being told it was "one of those things you have got to say you have done once, Cornie". He took a wicket in the match and went on to play several more times for Kent in 1919.

Cornwallis played first-class cricket fairly regularly for Kent between 1919 and 1923 as well as making one appearance for the Army in 1920. He was capped by Kent in 1923 and captained the team after his retirement from the Army between 1924 and 1926, playing much more regularly during this period. In total he made 105 first-class appearances for the county, taking 117 wickets.

Cornwallis was 27 when he made his first-class debut for Kent and, although he was "a genuinely fast bowler" his body was unable to withstand the rigours of consistent bowling. During his three years as Kent captain he was only able to bowl 560 overs, although his leadership abilities were strong enough to see the county to top-five finishes in the County Championship in each season. He was also considered a "good field" although "not normally regarded as a batsman". His highest score of 91, his only half-century, was made against Essex at Canterbury in 1926. This was his final year as captain and his last playing first-class cricket. He remained associated with Kent and was President of both the county club and MCC in 1948.

== Honours ==
Cornwallis was appointed Knight Commander of the Order of the British Empire (KBE) in 1945 and Knight Commander of the Royal Victorian Order (KCVO) in 1968. He was awarded an honorary doctorate Civil Law by the University of Kent and became a Knight of the Most Venerable Order of the Hospital of St. John of Jerusalem. He was also decorated with the award of the Knight Commander, Order of Dannebrog of Denmark.

== Family ==
Cornwallis was the second son of Fiennes Cornwallis and his wife Mabel Leigh. His oldest brother, Captain Fiennes Wykeham Mann Cornwallis, was killed by the Irish Republican Army in 1921 at the Ballyturin House Ambush near Gort in County Galway during the Irish War of Independence.

His younger brother, Oswald Cornwallis, served in the Royal Navy during the First and Second World Wars and played first-class cricket a few times for the Royal Navy. He also played one match for Hampshire in 1921 against Kent with the two brothers on opposing teams. The news of their older brother's death came during the match and both brothers were given leave to miss the majority of the match.

In 1917 Cornwallis returned to England from the Western Front to marry his first wife Cecily Etha Mary Walker, daughter of Captain Sir James Heron Walker, 3rd Baronet Walker of Sand Hutton at St Margaret's Church, Westminster. The couple had two children, Rosamond Cornwallis (15 May 1918 – 3 September 1960) and Fiennes Neil Wykeham Cornwallis (1921–2010). Their son succeeded Cornwallis as the Third Baron Cornwallis in 1982.

Cecily died in 1943 and Cornwallis married Lady Esme Walker in 1948. His second wife was the daughter of Montmorency d'Beaumont and widow of Sir Robert James Milo Walker, 4th Baronet Walker of Sand Hutton. They had no children. Esme died in 1969.

Cornwallis sold Linton Park in 1938. He died at his home Ashurst Park near Tunbridge Wells, where he had lived since 1970, in 1982 aged 89.

Peerage of the United Kingdom
Preceded by Fiennes Cornwallis	Baron Cornwallis; 1935–1982	Succeeded by Fiennes Cornwallis
Honorary titles
Preceded by The Marquess Camden	Lord Lieutenant of Kent; 1944–1972	Succeeded by The Lord Astor of Hever
Political offices
Preceded by ?	Chairman of Kent County Council; 1935–1936	Succeeded by ?
Academic offices
New university	Pro Chancellor of the University of Kent at Canterbury; 1960–1971	Succeeded by Sir Paul Chambers
Sporting positions
Preceded by Lionel Troughton	Kent County Cricket Club captain 1924–1926	Succeeded by John Evans
Masonic offices
Preceded by 1st Baron Cornwallis	Provincial Grand Master of Kent; 1935–1973	Succeeded by (Province divided)
New office	Provincial Grand Master of East Kent; 1973–1981	Succeeded by John Andrew Porter
