= George Fenner =

George Fenner may refer to:

- George Fenner (Cambridgeshire cricketer) (1799–1871), English cricketer
- George Fenner (Kent cricketer) (1896–1971), English cricketer
