= Sir Horace Mann, 1st Baronet =

British diplomat

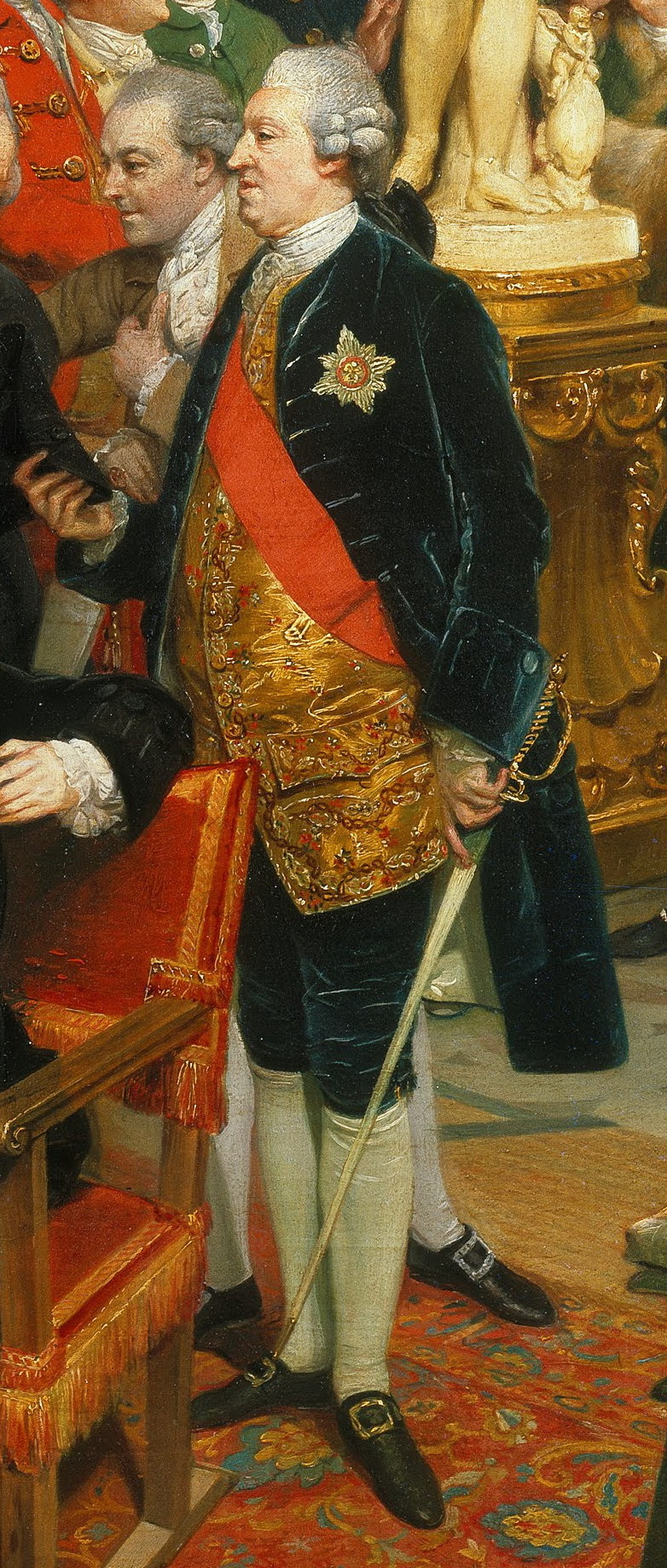
Sir Horace Mann, 1st Baronet

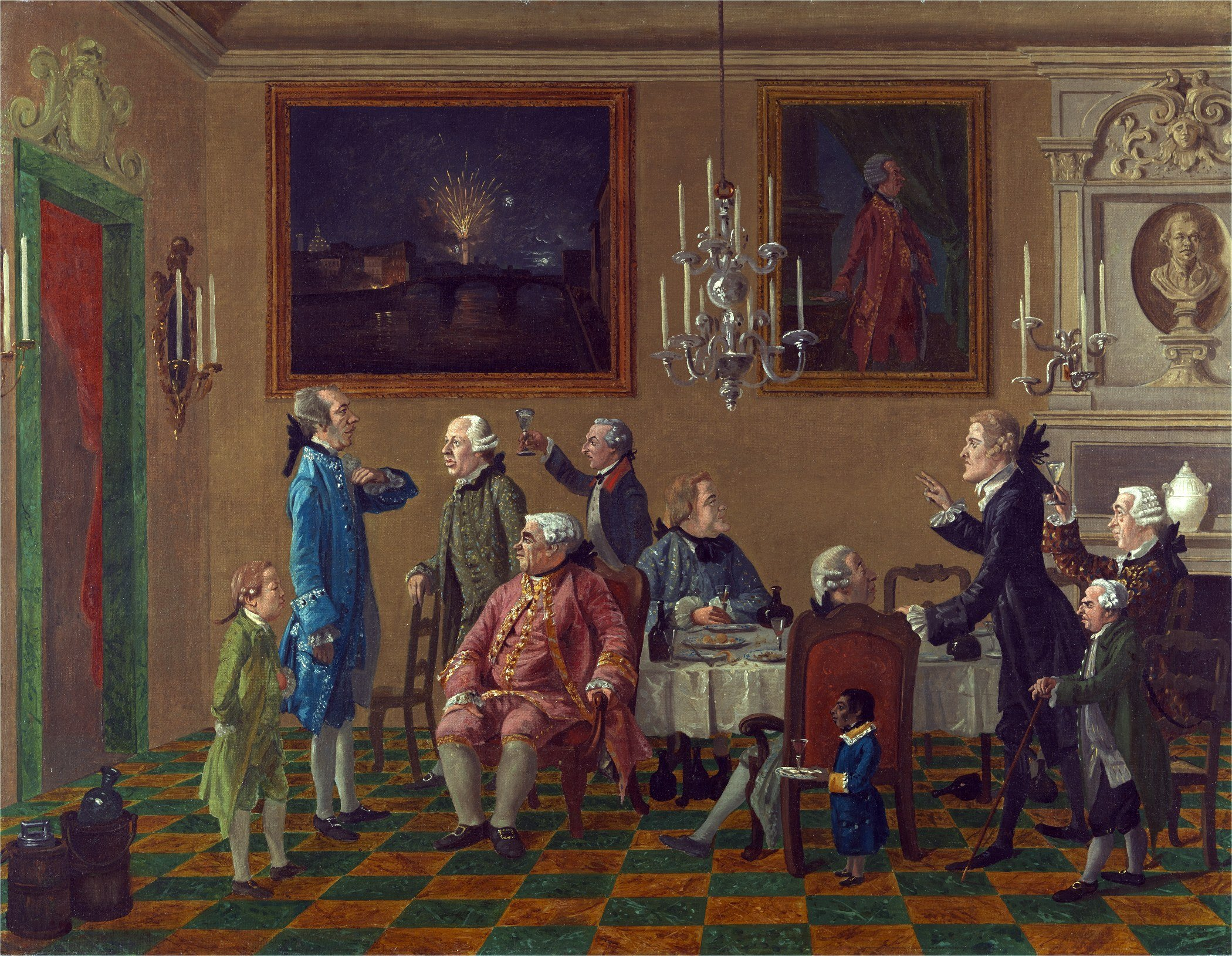
British Gentlemen at Sir Thomas Mann's's Home in Florence (circa 1765), including John Tylney, 2nd Earl Tylney, by Thomas Patch

Sir Horace Mann, 1st Baronet, KB (8 August 1706 – 6 November 1786) was a British diplomat in Florence.

== Life and career ==
Mann was the second son of Robert Mann (1678–1751), a successful London merchant, and his wife, Eleanor Guise Mann. He was baptised at St Martin's in the Fields, Middlesex, on 22 August 1706, brought up in Chelsea, and educated at Eton College and later, briefly, at Clare College, Cambridge. Suffering from poor health, he travelled on the continent in the 1730s.

In February 1737, he was appointed as secretary to Charles Fane, the British Minister at Florence. He then served as British diplomatic representative there to the Grand Dukes of Tuscany for the rest of his life.

In the course of his long diplomatic career, he was Chargé d'affaires in 1738-1740; Minister between 1740 and 1765; Envoy Extraordinary from 1767; and finally Envoy Extraordinary and Plenipotentiary from 1782 until his death.

As Great Britain had no diplomatic representation at Rome, Mann's duties included reporting on the activities of the exiled Stuarts, the Old Pretender and the Young Pretender.

Mann kept an open house for British visitors at Palazzo Manetti, Florence, inviting them for conversazione when there was no performance at the theatre. His generosity and kindness were well known, although his close friendship with the painter Thomas Patch (expelled from Rome after a homosexual incident) reflected on his reputation. He met Horace Walpole (to whom he was distantly related) in 1739, and conducted a now-renowned correspondence with him over forty years, though they last met in 1741. The correspondence was published by Lord Dover in 1833. There have been suggestions that the two Horaces entered into a sexual relationship. This is without foundation, although the two remained close throughout their lives.

In recognition of his service he was created a baronet on 3 March 1755, and made a Knight of the Bath on 26 October 1768, (when his nephew Horace stood proxy). In 1775, on the death of his elder brother, Edward Mann, Horace Mann inherited the Linton Park estate which his father had bought in Linton, Kent.

Mann died unmarried in Florence on 6 November 1786 and was buried in Linton on 17 February 1787. His nephew, Horace, inherited his baronetcy by special remainder and also acted as Chargé d'affaires until the arrival of his replacement.

Diplomatic posts
Preceded by Charles Fane	British Envoy to Tuscany; 1738–1786	Succeeded by Sir Horace Mann as Chargé d'affaires
Baronetage of Great Britain
New creation	Baronet (of Linton, Kent); 1755–1786	Succeeded by Horace Mann
