= Maurice Fenner =

English cricketer and military airman

Personal information
- Full name: Maurice David Fenner
- Born: 16 February 1929; Linton, Kent
- Died: 5 April 2015 (aged 86); Ashford, Kent
- Batting: Left-handed
- Role: Wicket-keeper

Domestic team information
- Years: Team
- 1949–1964: Combined Services
- 1951–1954: Kent

Career statistics
Competition	First-class
Matches	33
Runs scored	708
Batting average	14.75
100s/50s	0/2
Top score	77
Balls bowled	5
Wickets	1
Bowling average	1.00
5 wickets in innings	0
10 wickets in match	0
Best bowling	1/1
Catches/stumpings	47/13
- Source: Cricinfo, 4 May 2017

Maurice David Fenner (16 February 1929 – 5 April 2015) was an English military airman and amateur cricketer. He rose to the rank of Group Captain in the Royal Air Force, played first-class cricket for Combined Services and Kent County Cricket Club and was secretary of the county club in later life.

== Early life ==
Fenner was born in Linton in Kent in 1929 and attended Maidstone Grammar School. His father, George Fenner, had played first-class cricket and coached his son. On leaving school Fenner joined the Royal Air Force.

== Cricket career ==
Fenner played three times for Kent Second XI in 1946 and was offered a place on the Kent staff where his father was a coach. His trial noted that he was a "useful bat and wicket-keeper" and he generally played as a wicket-keeper throughout his career. He declined Kent's offer and joined the Royal Air Force, making his first-class cricket debut for Combined Services in August 1949 against Warwickshire. He continued to play for Kent Second XI in the Minor Counties Championship and for the RAF before making his County Championship debut for Kent in 1951 against Derbyshire.

Fenner played 14 times for Kent between 1951 and 1954, deputising for England wicket-keeper Godfrey Evans. He was awarded his Second XI county cap in 1952 and played as a batsman at times for the Second XI, captaining the team in the 1952 Minor Counties Championship Challenge Match. He made 19 first-class appearances for Combined Services until 1964 and played his final match for the RAF team in 1969 as a Squadron Leader. He captained both the Combined Services and RAF teams on occasions and kept wicket to bowlers such as Fred Trueman, Ray Illingworth and Fred Titmus who played for services teams whilst undertaking their National Service.

== Service career and later life ==
Fenner joined the Royal Air Force in 1947 and attended Royal Air Force College Cranwell as an officer cadet. He graduated in 1950 and trained as a navigator in 1951. He served in 101, 90 and 7 Squadrons before being promoted to Squadron Leader in 1959 and being transferred to the RAF Staff College, Bracknell. He served in the Air Ministry and with 100 Squadron in the 1960s and was promoted to Wing Commander in 1967. In 1970 he joined 44 Squadron at RAF Waddington before being promoted to Group Captain and serving on the staff at No 1 Group HQ at RAF Bawtry.

Fenner retired from the Royal Air Force with the rank of Group Captain. After his retirement he was secretary of Kent County Cricket Club between 1977 and 1982. He died at Ashford, Kent in 2015 aged 86.
