= Palazzo Manetti =

Coordinates: 43°46′07″N 11°14′52″E

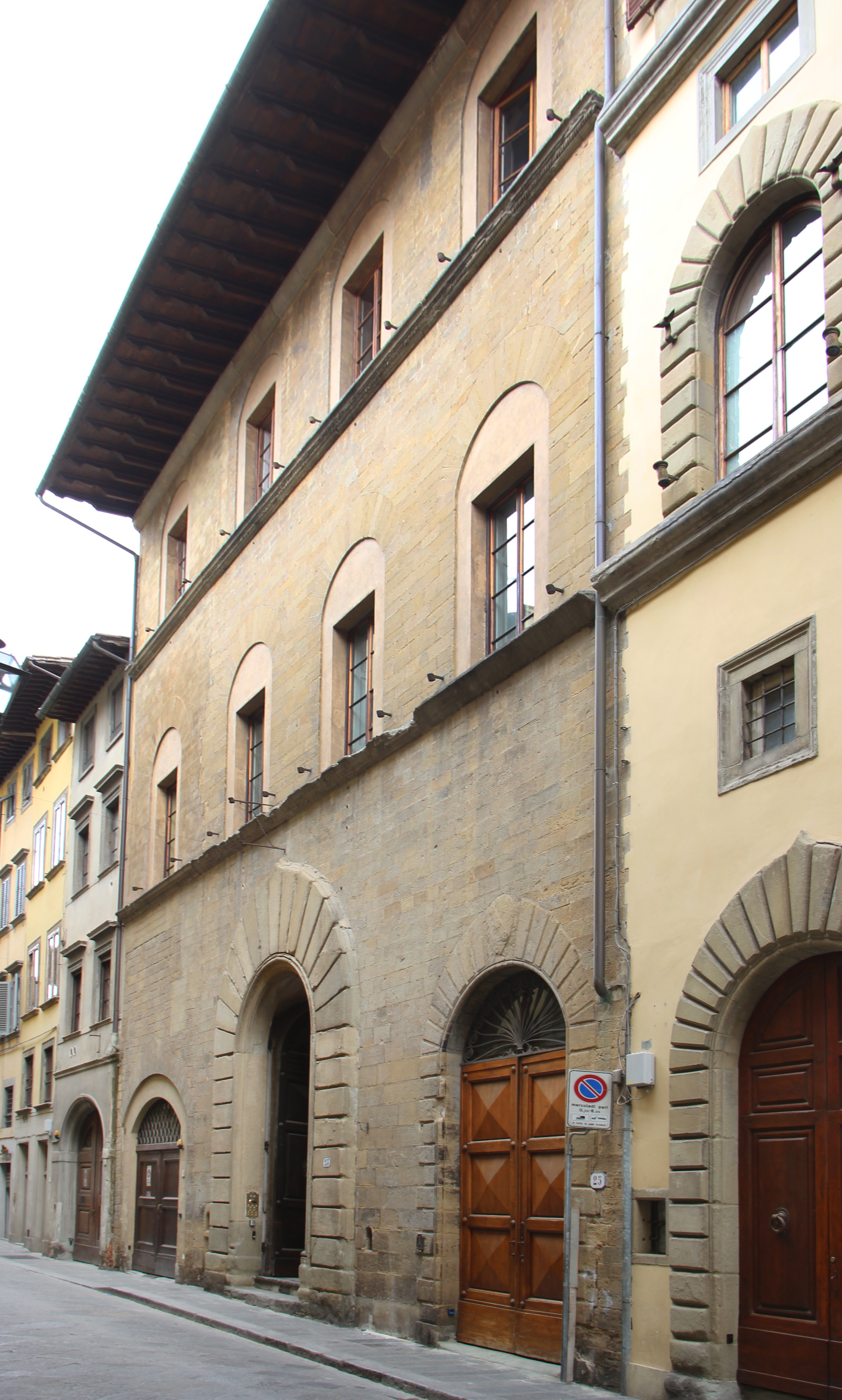
- Palazzo Manetti
- Interactive map of the Palazzo Manetti area

General information
- Location: Florence, Italy, Via Santo Spirito 23
- Opened: 15th century
- Client: Manetti family

Palazzo Manetti is a 15th Century Italian palazzo, located at Via Santo Spirito 23 in Florence.

== History and description ==
The palace was built in the early decades of the fifteenth century for the Manetti family, on properties owned by them since the second half of the fourteenth century. Among the prominent figures of the family was Giannozzo Manetti, a humanist and translator of Aristotle, who was disliked by Cosimo the Elder. Therefore, with the return of the pater patriae to Florence, he was forced to leave the city, first moving to Naples and then to Rome, where he initiated the collection of the Vatican Library.

The palace reached its peak in the eighteenth century when it was rented to the British diplomat Horace Mann, Resident Minister of the British Government, who opened the building to Florentine high society.

From 1737 onwards, there is an extensive correspondence with Horace Walpole, son of the Minister Sir Robert Walpole, in which he meticulously describes everything that happens in Florence, from the death of Gian Gastone de' Medici to that of the Electress Palatine (falling "ruining" the carnival), up to the arrival of the Lorraines. A painting by Thomas Patch entitled Gentlemen in the House of Horace Mann, once owned by the antiquarian Enrico Hughford, remains of that Florentine salon.

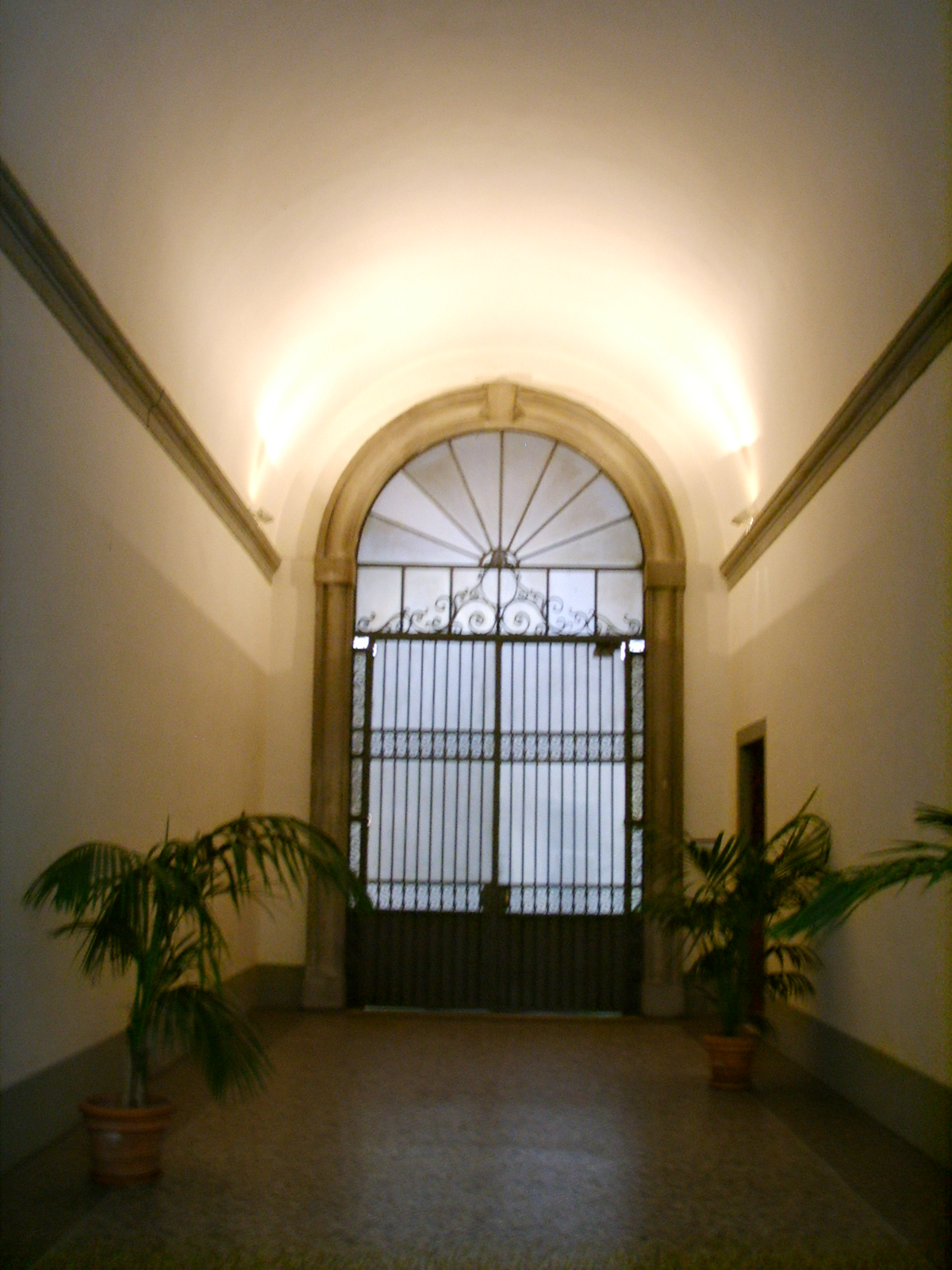
The atrium

The Manetti family owned the palace until the end of the eighteenth century, when it passed to the Gondis, the Fumagallis, and, at the beginning of the twentieth century, to the Cesaroni Venanzi family. The present appearance heavily reflects nineteenth-century interventions, which have altered both the facade and the interiors, especially in the part facing the garden.
