= Listed buildings in Linton, Kent =

Historic structure in Kent, England

Linton is a village and civil parish in the Borough of Maidstone of Kent, England It contains one grade I, one grade II* and 37 grade II listed buildings that are recorded in the National Heritage List for England.

This list is based on the information retrieved online from Historic England.

== Key ==
Grade	Criteria
I	Buildings that are of exceptional interest
II*	Particularly important buildings of more than special interest
II	Buildings that are of special interest

== Listing ==
Name	Grade	Location	Type	Completed (Note: The date given is the date used by Historic England as significant for the initial building or that of an important part in the structure's description.)	Date designated	Grid ref. (Note: The grid reference is based on the British national grid reference system, sometimes known as OSGB36, used by the Ordnance Survey.) Geo-coordinates	Notes	Entry number (Note: The "List Entry Number" is a unique number assigned to each listed building and scheduled monument by Historic England.)	Image	Wikidata
Flight of Steps About 20 Metres South of Linton Park	II				26 February 1987	TQ7580049923; 51°13′17″N 0°30′58″E		1250187	Upload Photo	Q26542253
Former Stables and Paved Yard About 70 Metres North East of Linton Park	II				23 May 1967	TQ7587850013; 51°13′20″N 0°31′02″E		1250217	Upload Photo	Q26542281
Ice House About 23 Metres North West of Former Stables at Linton Park	II				26 February 1987	TQ7587150063; 51°13′22″N 0°31′02″E		1250220	Upload Photo	Q96281929
Linton Cricket Club Cricket Pavilion	II				23 July 2015	TQ7591650553; 51°13′37″N 0°31′05″E		1427061	Upload Photo	Q26677326
Linton Park	I				25 July 1952	TQ7579749957; 51°13′18″N 0°30′58″E		1250171	Linton Park More images	Q12061172
Sundial About 33 Metres South of Flight of Steps to South of Linton Park	II				26 February 1987	TQ7580549888; 51°13′16″N 0°30′58″E		1250200	Upload Photo	Q26542266
North Lodge	II	Heath Road			26 February 1987	TQ7574150846; 51°13′47″N 0°30′56″E		1250222	Upload Photo	Q96282694
Barn About 16 Metres North of Hill Place	II	Linton Hill			26 February 1987	TQ7539350528; 51°13′37″N 0°30′38″E		1250309	Upload Photo	Q26542365
Church of St Nicholas	II*	Linton Hill			23 May 1967	TQ7545650144; 51°13′25″N 0°30′41″E		1250235	Church of St Nicholas More images	Q17545269
Forge Cottage and Miladys Forge House	II	Linton Hill			23 May 1967	TQ7539450203; 51°13′27″N 0°30′37″E		1263335	Upload Photo	Q26554130
Hill Place	II	Linton Hill			23 May 1967	TQ7541050500; 51°13′36″N 0°30′39″E		1250299	Upload Photo	Q26542355
K6 Telephone Kiosk	II	Linton Hill			4 February 1988	TQ7541550126; 51°13′24″N 0°30′38″E		1262894	Upload Photo	Q26553737
Linton Cottage	II	Linton Hill			23 May 1967	TQ7558849167; 51°12′53″N 0°30′46″E		1250333	Upload Photo	Q26542388
Monument About 2 Metres North of Chancel of Church of St Nicholas	II	Linton Hill			26 February 1987	TQ7547250151; 51°13′25″N 0°30′41″E		1263329	Upload Photo	Q26554125
Monument About 3 Metres South of Porch of Church of St Nicholas	II	Linton Hill			26 February 1987	TQ7545450127; 51°13′24″N 0°30′40″E		1263328	Upload Photo	Q26554124
Monument About 6.5 Metres North West of Tower of Church of St Nicholas	II	Linton Hill			26 February 1987	TQ7543350156; 51°13′25″N 0°30′39″E		1250296	Upload Photo	Q26542352
Monument Against North Wall of Tower of Church of St Nicholas	II	Linton Hill			26 February 1987	TQ7544250153; 51°13′25″N 0°30′40″E		1250295	Upload Photo	Q26542351
Monument of Margaret Avenell About 2.5 Metres North of Vestry of Church of St Nicholas	II	Linton Hill			26 February 1987	TQ7546950155; 51°13′25″N 0°30′41″E		1250253	Upload Photo	Q26542311
Monument to Caroline Cornwallis About 40 Metres South of Chancel of Church of St Nicholas	II	Linton Hill			26 February 1987	TQ7547350107; 51°13′23″N 0°30′41″E		1250258	Upload Photo	Q26542316
Monument to George Maytham About 6 Metres South of South Aisle of Church of St Nicholas	II	Linton Hill			26 February 1987	TQ7544550128; 51°13′24″N 0°30′40″E		1263358	Upload Photo	Q26554152
Monument to Richard Rich	II	Linton Hill			26 February 1987	TQ7546150131; 51°13′24″N 0°30′41″E		1263326	Upload Photo	Q26554122
Monument to Sophia De Brette About 23 Metres South East of Chancel of Church of St Nicholas	II	Linton Hill			26 February 1987	TQ7548850123; 51°13′24″N 0°30′42″E		1250274	Upload Photo	Q26542331
Monument to Stephen Dartnell About 5 Metres South of South Chapel of Church of St Nicholas	II	Linton Hill			26 February 1987	TQ7546650135; 51°13′24″N 0°30′41″E		1250260	Upload Photo	Q26542318
Monument to Thomas Paul About 6 Metres East of Chancel of Church of St Nicholas	II	Linton Hill			26 February 1987	TQ7547950144; 51°13′25″N 0°30′42″E		1250285	Upload Photo	Q26542341
Monument to Thomas Watkins About 2.5 Metres North of East End of North Aisle of Church of St Nicholas	II	Linton Hill			26 February 1987	TQ7545850156; 51°13′25″N 0°30′41″E		1250292	Upload Photo	Q26542348
Path Running Straight from Road to Within 1.5 Metres of West Doorway of Church of St Nicholas, with Curving Branch Running in Front of Almshouse	II	Linton Hill			26 February 1987	TQ7543750142; 51°13′25″N 0°30′40″E		1250228	Upload Photo	Q26542290
Ragstone	II	Linton Hill			26 February 1987	TQ7543150124; 51°13′24″N 0°30′39″E		1250297	Upload Photo	Q26542353
The Almshouses	II	1-5, Linton Hill			26 February 1987	TQ7542250176; 51°13′26″N 0°30′39″E		1250225	Upload Photo	Q26542287
The Bull Inn	II	Linton Hill			23 May 1967	TQ7539850175; 51°13′26″N 0°30′38″E		1263336	The Bull Inn More images	Q26554131
The Laurels	II	Linton Hill			26 February 1987	TQ7542950065; 51°13′22″N 0°30′39″E		1250327	Upload Photo	Q26542383
The Old Vicarage	II	Linton Hill			23 May 1967	TQ7541650085; 51°13′23″N 0°30′38″E		1250315	Upload Photo	Q26542371
Three Chimneys	II	Linton Hill			26 February 1987	TQ7547549467; 51°13′03″N 0°30′40″E		1263286	Upload Photo	Q26554082
Burford Farm House	II	Redwall Lane			26 February 1987	TQ7387449055; 51°12′51″N 0°29′17″E		1250335	Upload Photo	Q26542390
Court Lodge	II	Vanity Lane			23 May 1967	TQ7491850245; 51°13′29″N 0°30′13″E		1250337	Upload Photo	Q26542392
Rose Cottage and Stockyard Attached	II	Vanity Lane			26 February 1987	TQ7487050124; 51°13′25″N 0°30′10″E		1250370	Upload Photo	Q26542421
Rose Hill	II	Vanity Lane, ME17 4BP			26 February 1987	TQ7487250170; 51°13′26″N 0°30′11″E		1263313	Upload Photo	Q26554109
Folly, West End of North Walk, Linton Park, Kent Located At TQ 755 501	II				26 February 1987	TQ7549750099; 51°13′23″N 0°30′43″E		1263363	Upload Photo	Q26554157
Snoads Hall and Number 1 Snoads Hall	II	Westerhill Road			26 February 1987	TQ7421249948; 51°13′20″N 0°29′36″E		1250371	Upload Photo	Q26542422
Westerhill Farmhouse	II	Westerhill Road			23 May 1967	TQ7407050262; 51°13′30″N 0°29′29″E		1263284	Upload Photo	Q26554080

== See also ==
- Grade I listed buildings in Kent
- Grade II* listed buildings in Kent

== Sources ==
- Newman, John (2012) [1969], Kent: West and the Weald, The Buildings of England, New Haven and London: Yale University Press, ISBN 978-0-300-18509-6
