= Fiennes Cornwallis, 3rd Baron Cornwallis =

English peer (1921–2010)

The Lord Cornwallis
- Born: Fiennes Neil Wykeham Cornwallis; 29 June 1921
- Died: 6 March 2010 (aged 88)
- Education: Eton College
- Title: 3rd Baron Cornwallis
- Predecessor: 2nd Baron Cornwallis
- Successor: 4th Baron Cornwallis
- Spouse(s): Judith Lacy (née Scott); divorced Agnes Jean Russell (née Landale); her death Stephanie Coleman (her death)
- Children: 6 children

Fiennes Neil Wykeham Cornwallis, 3rd Baron Cornwallis, OBE, DL (29 June 1921 – 6 March 2010) was a British peer. He was the younger child, and the only son, of Wykeham Cornwallis, 2nd Baron Cornwallis and Cecily Etha Mary (née Walker). He had an elder sister, Rosamond Patricia Susan Anne Cornwallis (15 May 1918 – 3 September 1960).

He attended Eton College. Upon the death of his father in 1982, he succeeded him as the 3rd Baron Cornwallis.

== Biography ==
During World War II, Lord Cornwallis served with the Coldstream Guards between 1940 – 1944 when he was invalided out of the army. He was also a very senior Freemason, and served as Pro Grand Master of the United Grand Lodge of England from 1982 to 1992, having previously been Deputy Grand Master, and Pro First Grand Principal of the Supreme Grand Chapter of England and Wales from 1982 to 1992, having previously been Second Grand Principal.

He had been a stamp collector since his youth. His specialised collections of Australia, Gambia, Gibraltar, and Malta stamps were sold in 2011. He was a fellow of the Royal Philatelic Society London from 1988 and a member of the Royal Tunbridge Wells Philatelic Society.

== Family life ==
Lord Cornwallis married three times. His first wife was Judith Lacy (née Scott), daughter of Lt.-Col. Geffrey Lacy Scott. They married on 17 October 1942 and were divorced in 1948. They had two children: Anne Judy Cornwallis (13 November 1943 – 26 June 1966), and Fiennes Wykeham Jeremy Cornwallis (b. 25 May 1946), the 4th Baron Cornwallis.

He married, secondly, Agnes Jean Russell (née Landale), daughter of Captain Henderson Russell Landale, on 1 June 1951 with whom he had four children: Patrick Wykeham David Cornwallis (b. 28 May 1952), Cecily Mary Clare McCulloch (b. 23 October 1954), Vanessa Rachel Middleton (b. 27 July 1958), and Susan Patricia Rose Crolla (née Cornwallis) (b. 30 March 1963). Lady Cornwallis died on 15 March 2001. Lord Cornwallis married, thirdly, Stephanie Coleman, on 6 April 2002. She died on 4 December 2009.

== Bibliography ==
- Kidd, Charles; Williamson, David (editors). Debrett's Peerage and Baronetage (1990 edition).
  New York: St Martin's Press, 1990. ISBN 0-333-38847-X

Peerage of the United Kingdom
Preceded by Wykeham Cornwallis	Baron Cornwallis; 1982–2010	Succeeded by Jeremy Cornwallis
Masonic offices
Preceded by The Earl Cadogan	Pro Grand Master of the United Grand Lodge of England; 1982–1992	Succeeded by The Lord Farnham
