= St Nicholas Church, Linton =

Parish church in Kent, England

Coordinates: 51.223533°N 0.511256°E

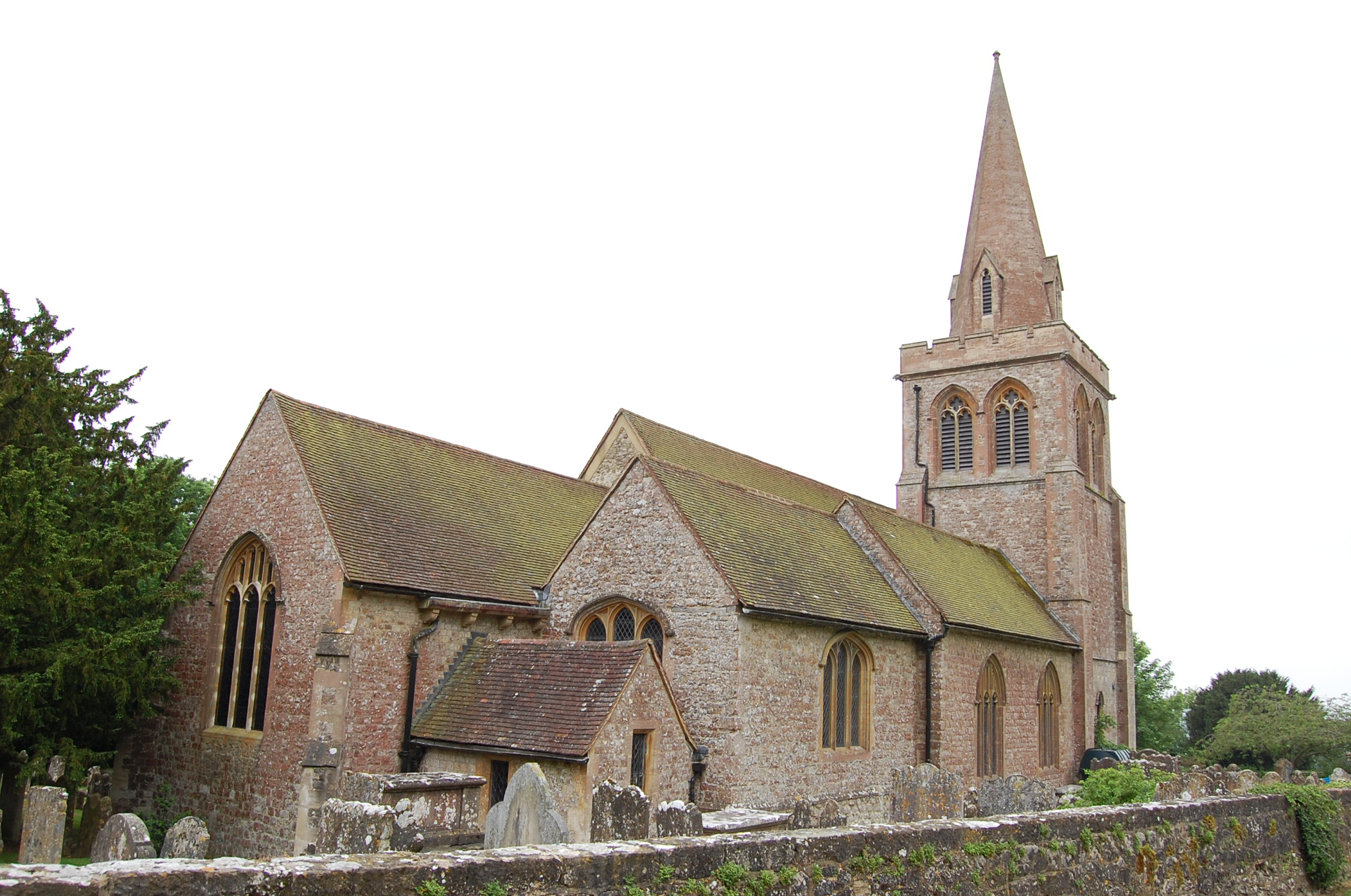

- Location within Kent
- OS grid reference: TQ 75456 50144
- Location: Linton, Kent
- Country: England
- Denomination: Anglican
- Website: unitedbenefice.church/linton

History
- Status: Parish church

Architecture
- Functional status: Active
- Heritage designation: Grade II*
- Designated: 23 May 1967
- Completed: Norman Era

Administration
- Province: Canterbury
- Diocese: Rochester
- Archdeaconry: Tonbridge
- Deanery: Paddock Wood
- Parish: Linton

St Nicholas Church is a parish church in the village of Linton, Kent, England. It is a Grade II* listed building.

== Building ==
St Nicholas Church is located adjacent to the A229 on Linton Hill.

The building is Grade II* listed, built of ragstone, with plain tile roof.

Some of the monuments in the church were sculpted by EH Baily, who was also sculpted the figure of Lord Nelson in Trafalgar Square.

== History ==
The church was originally a Norman Structure.

The church was most significantly reconstructed in the 1560s.

The church was last reconstructed in 1860, under architect R C Hussey.

== Gallery ==
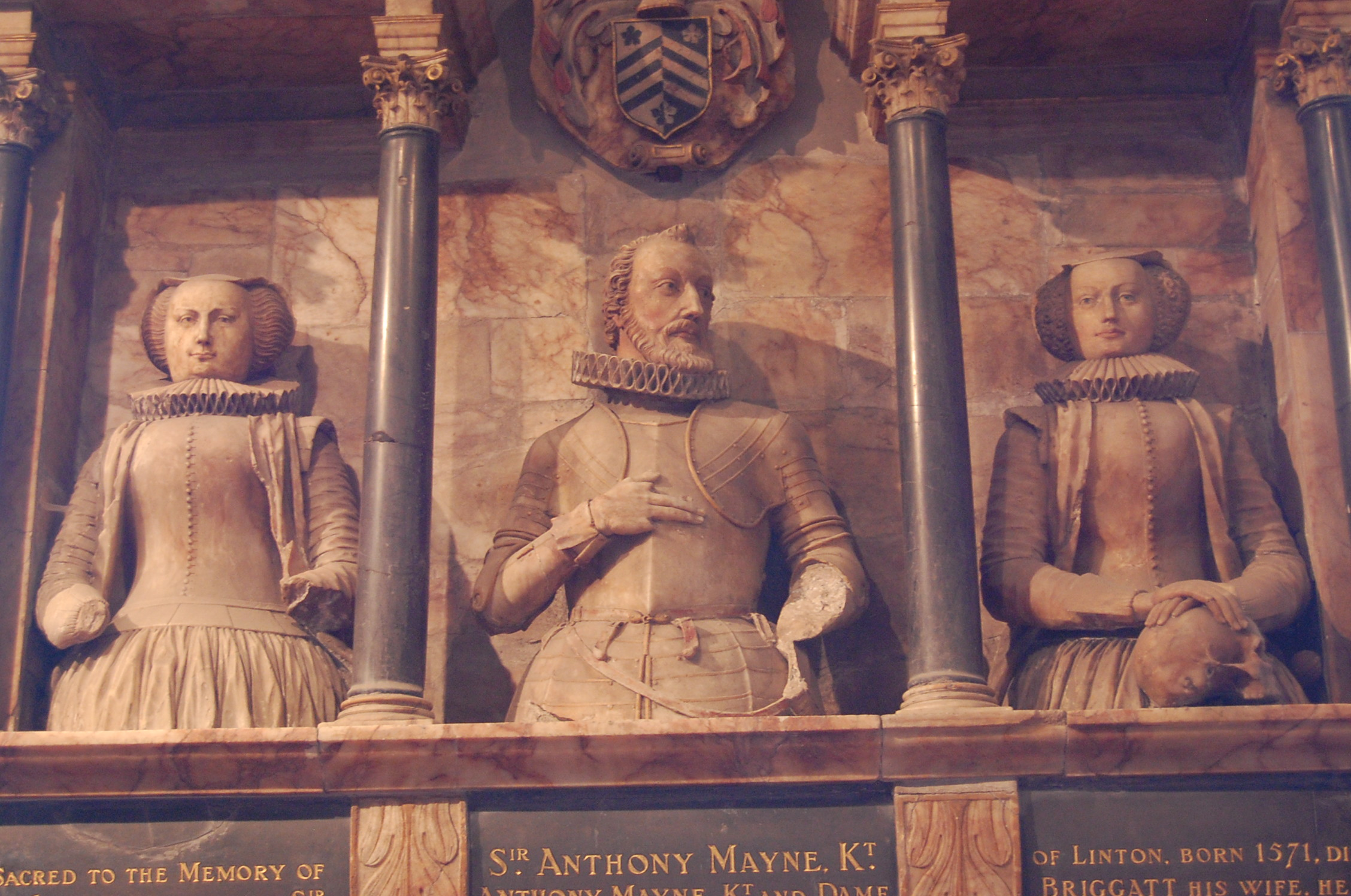
Memorial to Sir Anthony Mayne

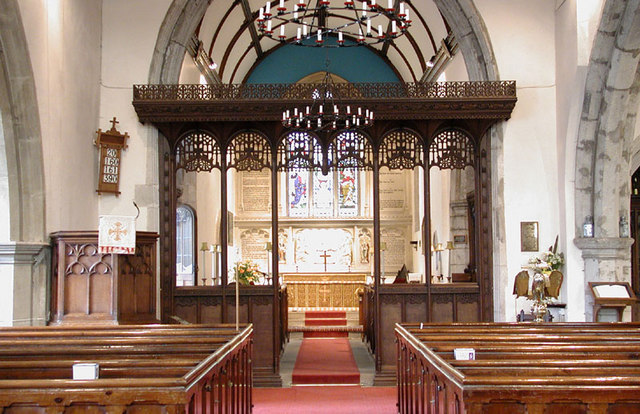
The east end of the church

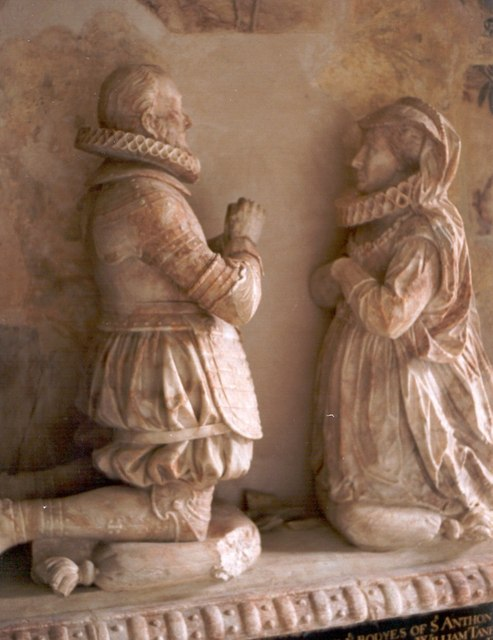
Effigies

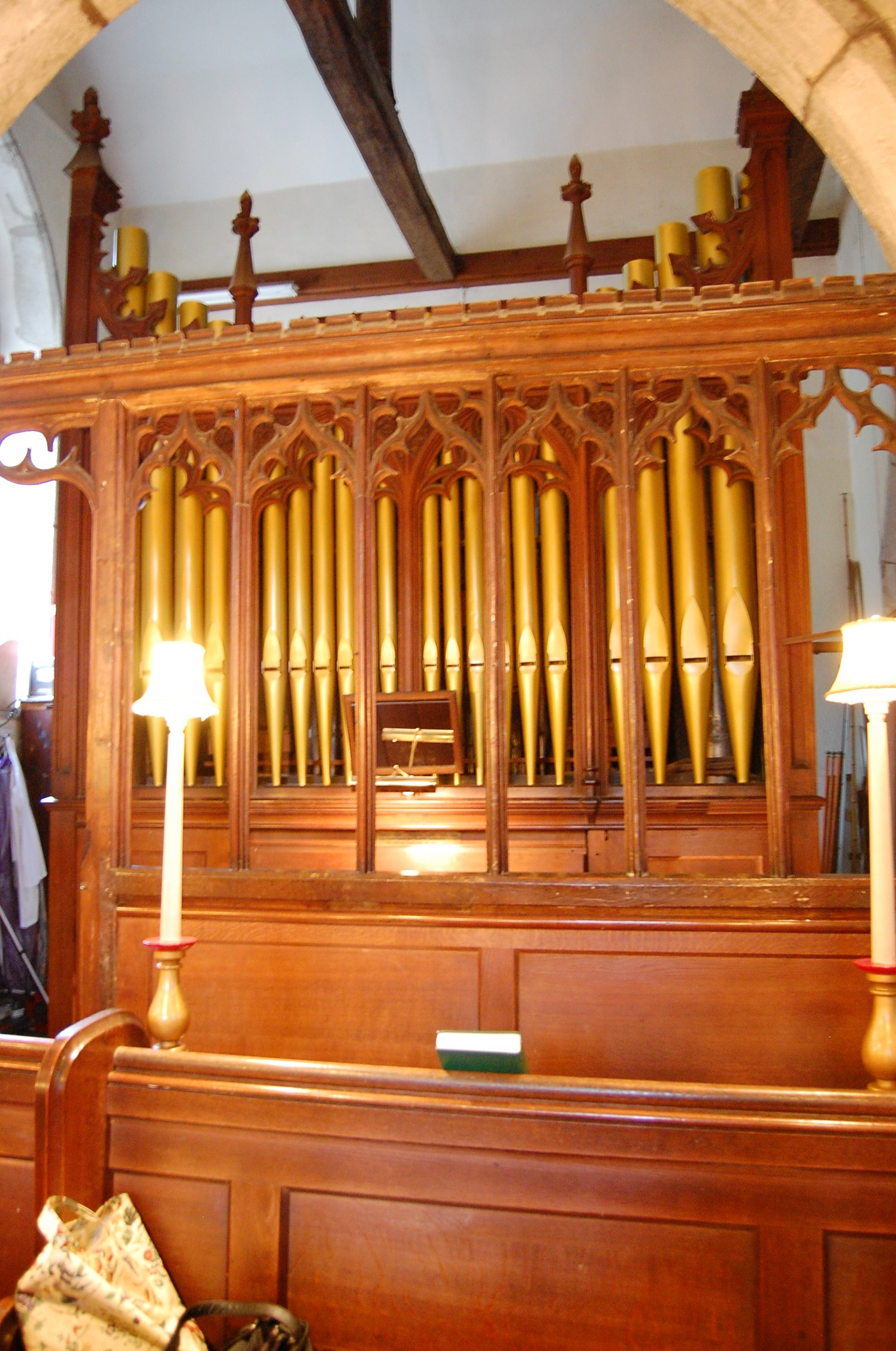
The church organ

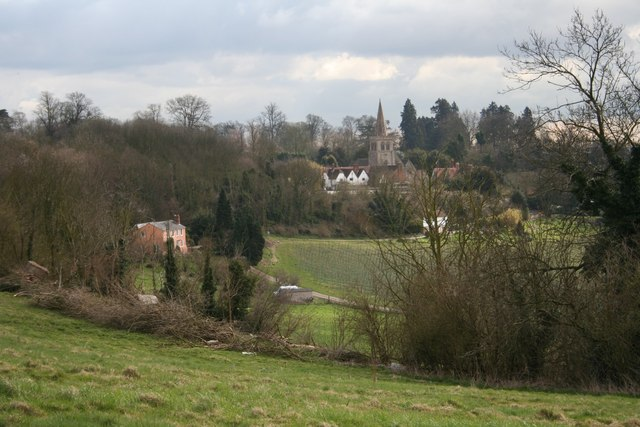
View of the church from the Greensand Way

== See also ==
- Linton, Kent
