= Thomas Patch =

English painter, printmaker and historian (1725-1782)

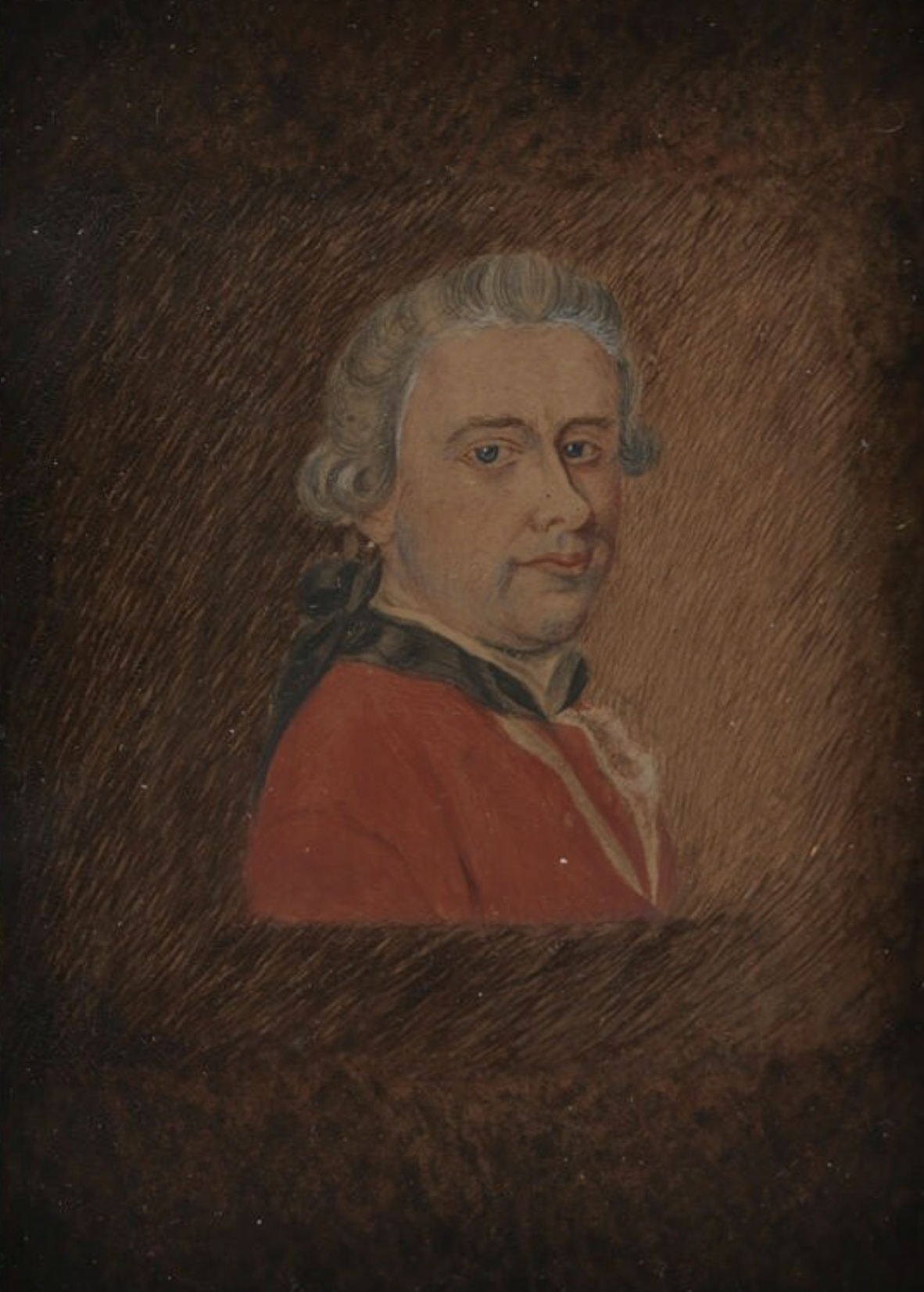
- Self-portrait, c. 1745
- Born: 13 March 1725; Exeter, England
- Died: 30 April 1782 (aged 57); Florence, Italy
- Education: Medicine
- Known for: Painter, Caricaturist

Thomas Patch (13 March 1725 – 30 April 1782) was an English painter, printmaker, physiognomist and historian. He made a living from painting views of Florence and Tivoli and appears to have sold a number of painted caricature groups to members of the Anglo-Florentine community and to young British men on the Grand Tour. The largest collection of his paintings and prints is in the Lewis Walpole Library in Farmington, Connecticut.

== Biography ==
Patch was born in Exeter in 1725. He was the son of a distinguished doctor and was expected to become an apothecary. He had not completed his medical studies when he journeyed to Rome in 1747 with Richard Dalton, who was to become the librarian to George III. In Rome he met Joshua Reynolds who was, at the time, producing a number of Caricature groups. Initially he worked for Joseph Vernet, creating landscapes of Tivoli and pastiches of Vernet's work.

In 1755, he was banished from Rome by the Tribunale della Santa Inquisizione, apparently for homosexual indiscretions. He fled to Florence where he remained for the rest of his life. He was assisted by his friendship with Sir Horace Mann, who was the British envoy and a point of contact with British tourists arriving in Florence.

In Florence, he completed a detailed study of human physiognomy which, to his great sadness, was stolen and burnt. Despite this there remains some evidence of his work in this field. In 1768 and 1769 he speedily produced a number of prints, some of which have been used to identify some of the figures in the twenty or so painted caricature groups he produced during the 1760s and early 1770s. These canvases are his best known works, though the sitters have been frequently misidentified.

In addition, Patch was amongst the first artists to study early Italian art seriously and he published series of prints that reproduce of work by Giotto, Masaccio, Ghiberti and Fra Bartolommeo. He may well have intended to produce many more. The volume about Fra Bartolommeo, published in 1772, was inscribed, The life of Frá Bartolommeo della Porta, a Tuscan painter, with his works, engraved from the original pictures, dedicated, to the Honourable Horace Walpole, an Intelligent Promoter of the fine Arts, by his most Obedient and most humble Servant Thomas Patch. Walpole, a relation of Horace Mann, the Prime Minister and a major art collector was an obvious and useful contact.

In addition, Patch, like many other expatriates, supplemented his income by supplying works of art for Grand Tourists. The most famous work with which he has been associated is a sculpture by Giambologna.

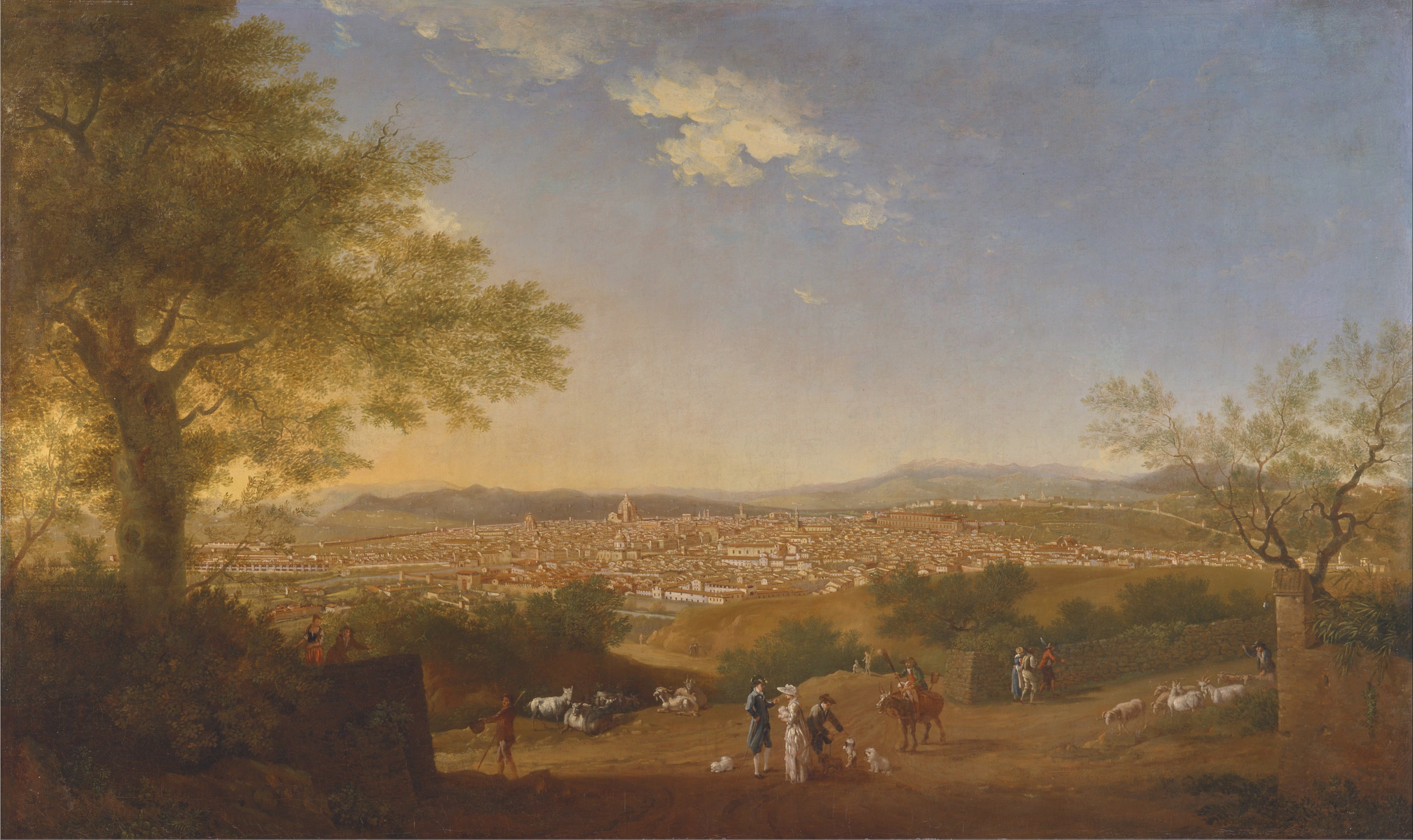
A panoramic view of Florence from Bellosguardo, 1775

In about 1763, Patch completed three views of Florence that are now part of the Royal Collection that were purchased by George III. 'Bridge-painting', as he called his views of Florence, must have been his most lucrative activity. Two canvases of Mount Vesuvius in the Uffizi in Florence have been attributed to him, but these have not been universally accepted as genuine.

Towards the end of his life his output of paintings slowed and he became disillusioned by his inability to complete projects. He suffered an attack of apoplexy at Mann's house 29 April 1782 and died in his own house across the street the next day.

== Likeness ==
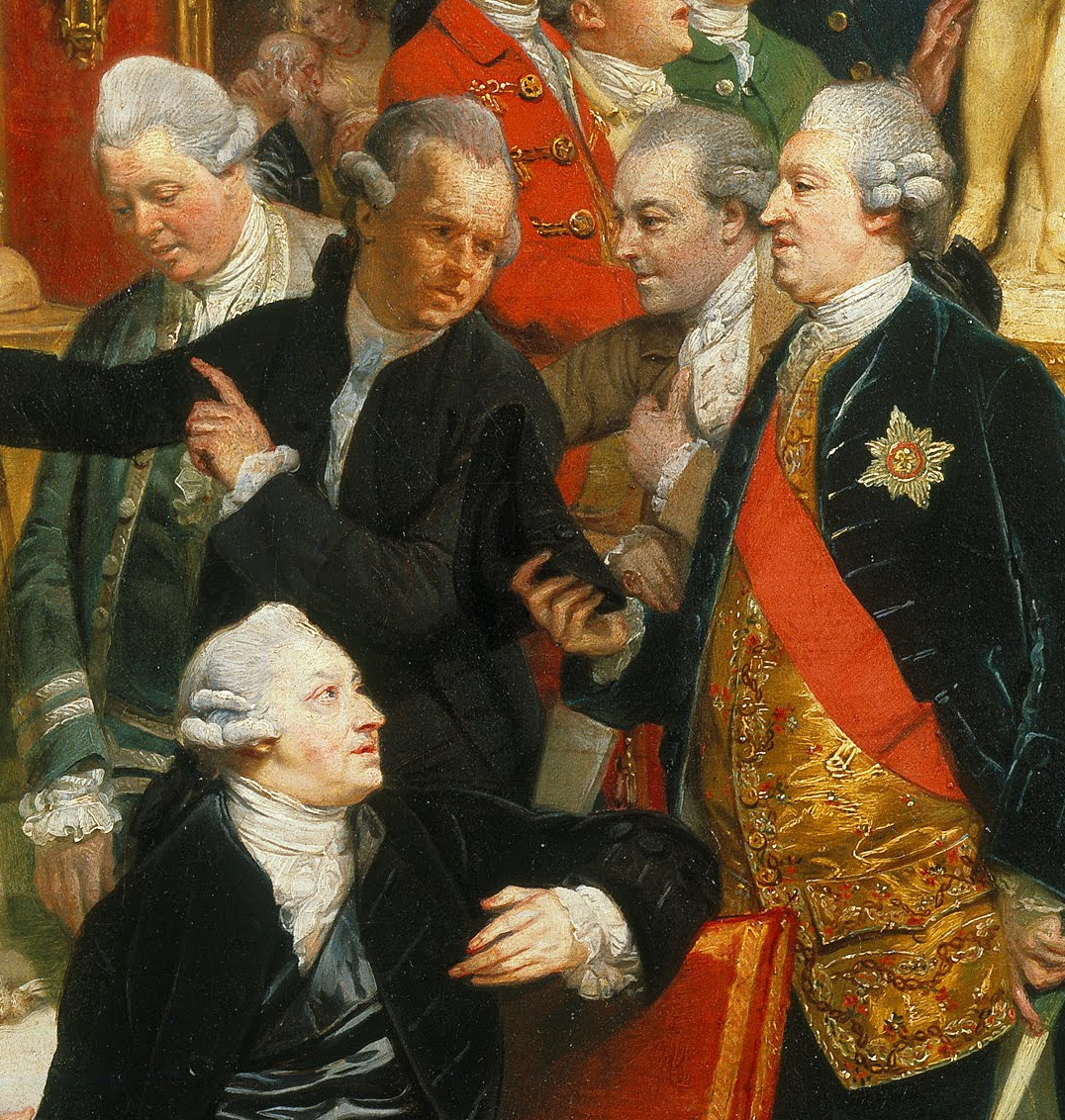
Detail from Tribuna of the Uffizi. From left to right (standing): Mr Gordon, Patch, Sir John Taylor Bt, Sir Horace Mann and in front Felton Hervey

Patch appears in Johann Zoffany's "The Tribuna of the Uffizi" where we see him engaged with Sir Horace Mann & company appraising the charms of the Venus of Urbino. Zoffany places Patch's right hand on the painting whilst wryly having him gesture towards a classical sculpture of nude wrestlers with his left.

Patch engraved himself twice, on one occasion his head is attached to the body of a bull, and he includes himself in several of his caricature groups. In his paintings in the Royal Albert Memorial Museum in Exeter and in the Yale Center for British Art in New Haven he is shown as a sculpted bust displayed on a wall sconce and in the twelve-foot long painting at the Lewis Walpole Library at Yale (another version is at Chatsworth, Derbyshire) of a party of Englishmen at Sir Horace's palazzo in Florence, "The Golden Asses," the artist sits astride the eponymous equine.

== Gallery ==
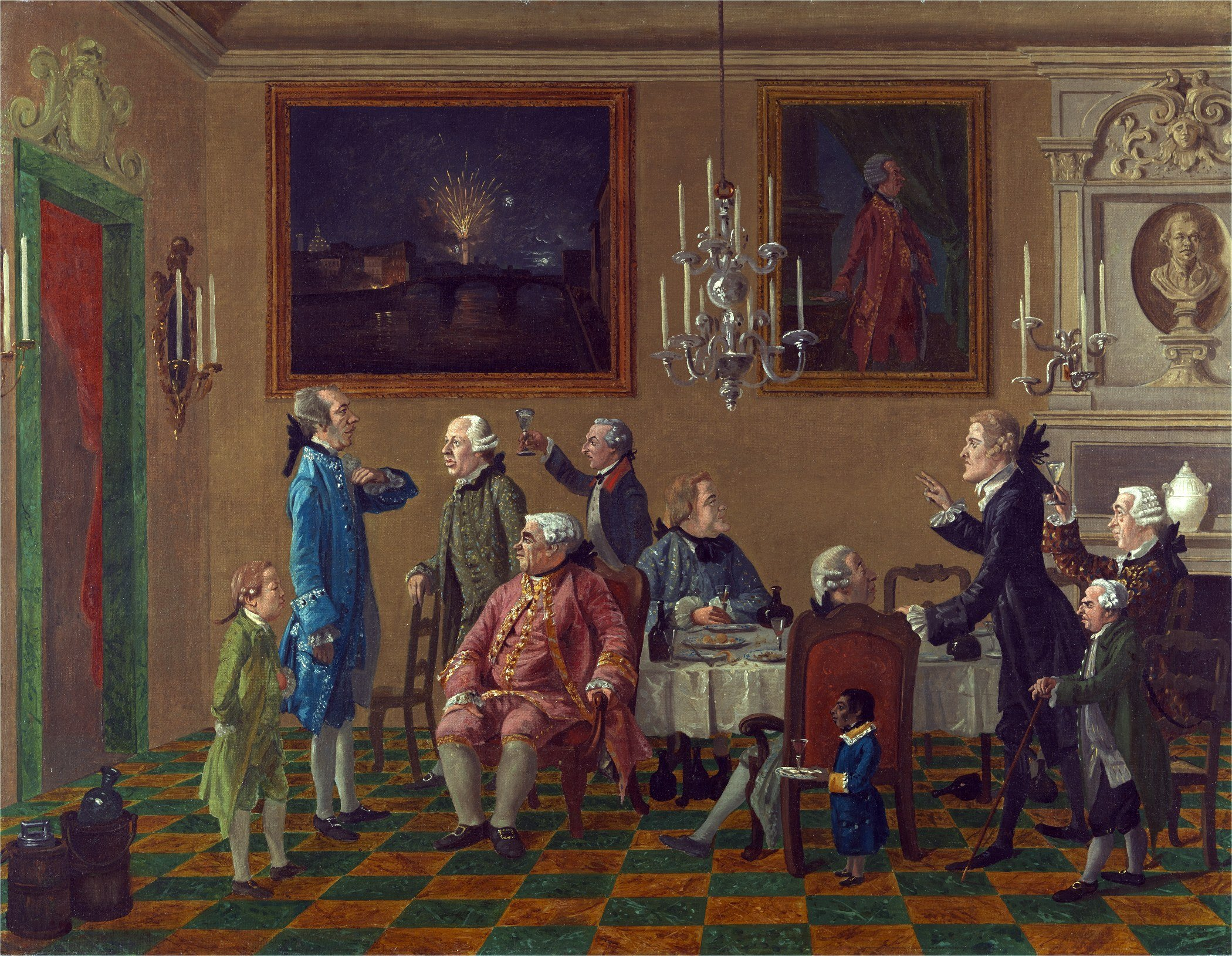
British Gentlemen at Sir Horace Mann's Home in Florence (circa 1765), including John Tylney, 2nd Earl Tylney; currently at the Yale Center for British Art, Paul Mellon Collection

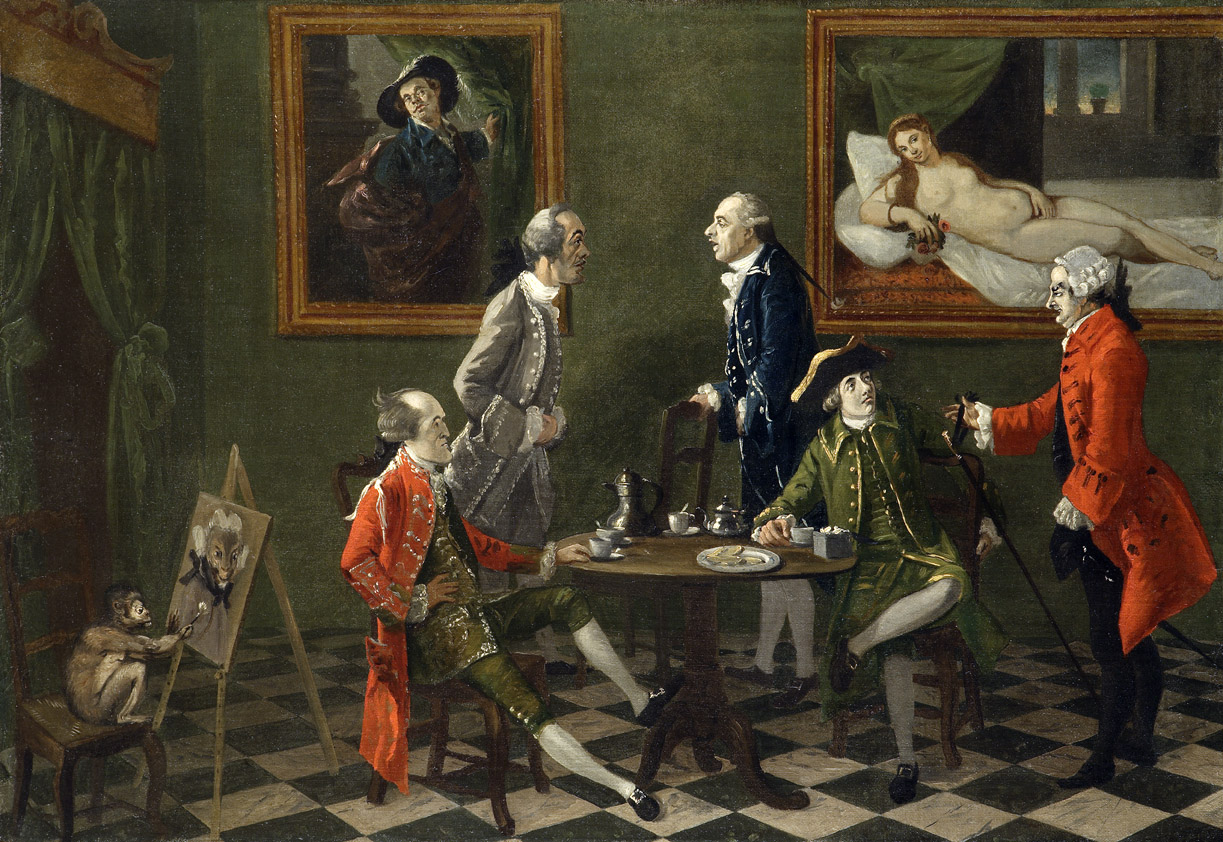
The Cognoscenti: including Captain Walcot, Mr Apthorpe and Thomas Patch (1757–59)

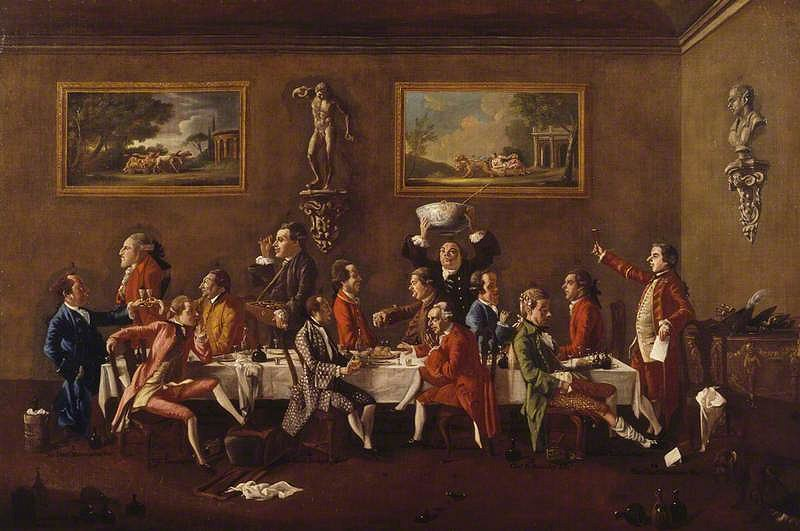
A Punch Party in Florence (1760)

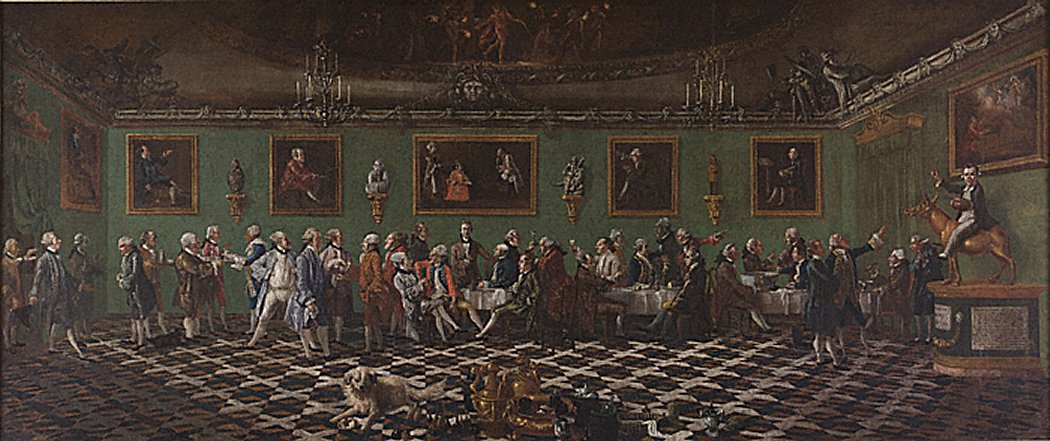
The Golden Asses (1761)

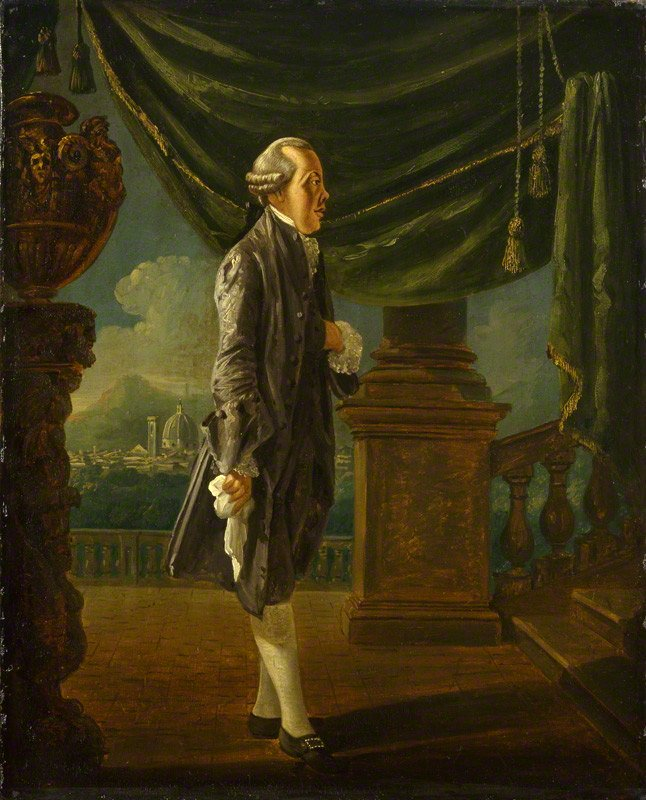
John Ker, 3rd Duke of Roxburghe (circa 1761)

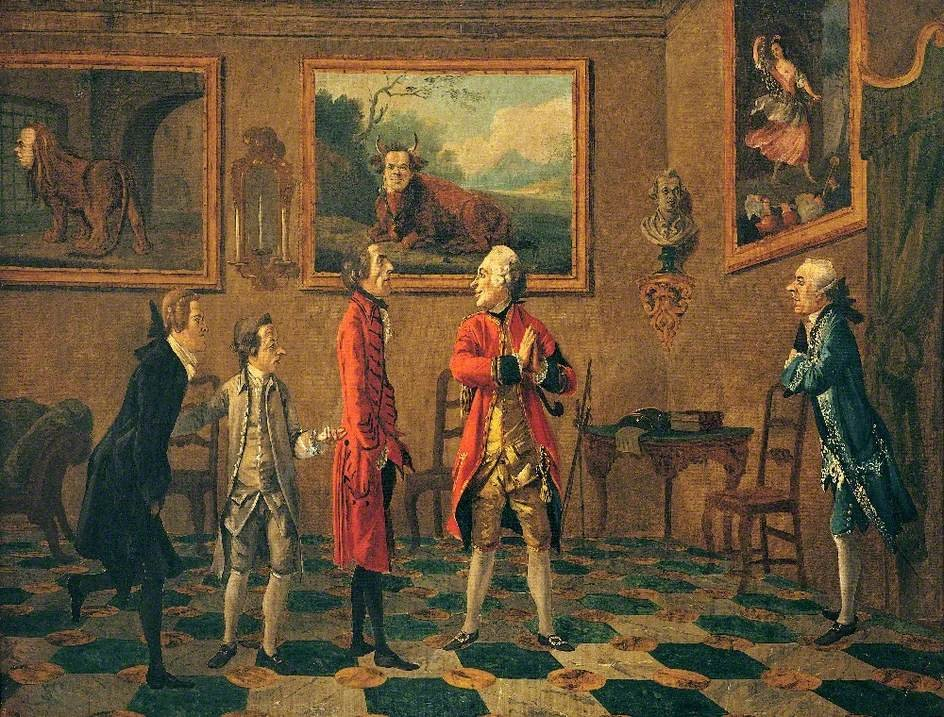
Skipwith conversation piece

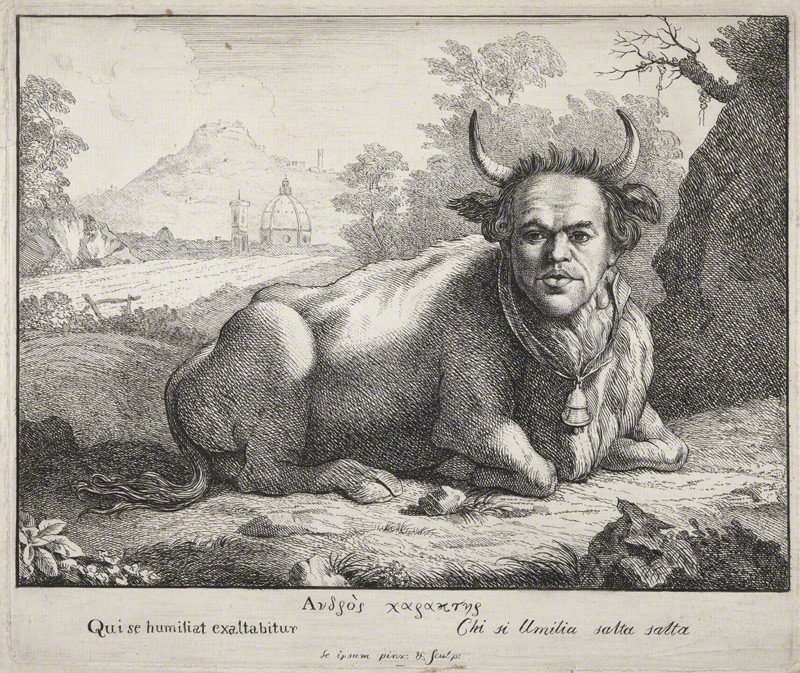
Self-portrait as Bull, etching (late 1760s)

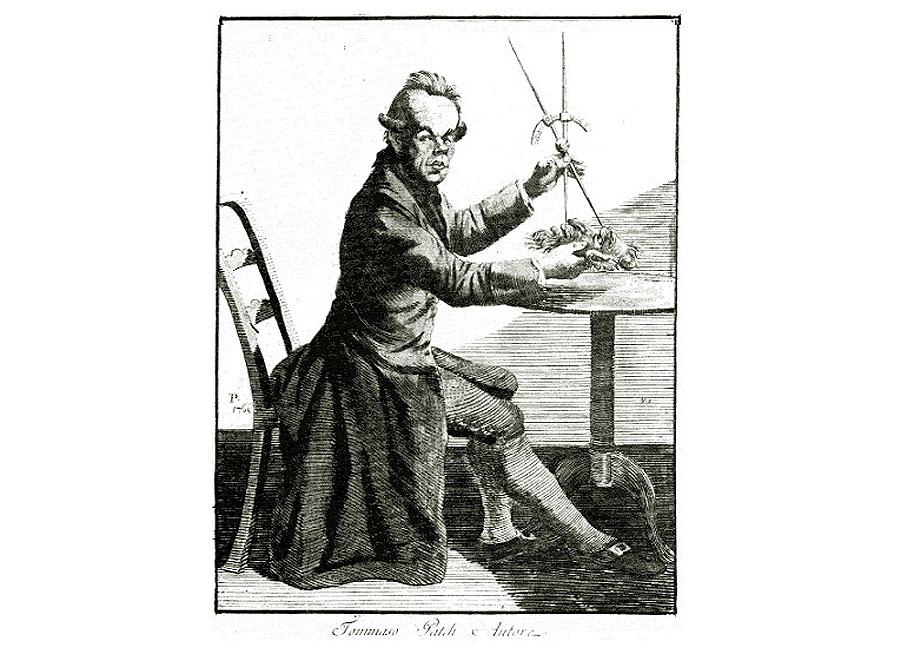
Self-portrait with Calipers (circa 1769)

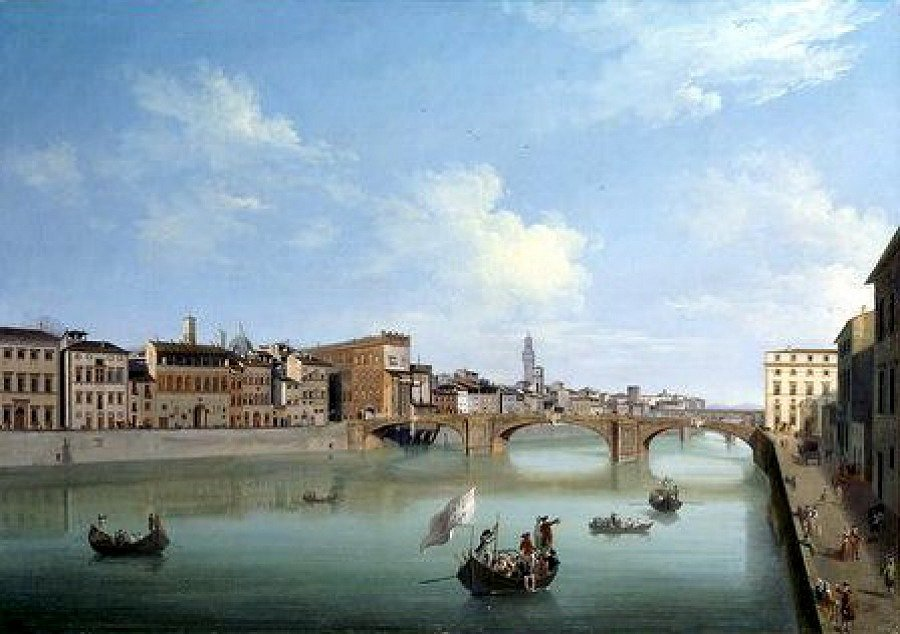
View of the Arno with the Ponte Santa Trinità, Florence (1769)

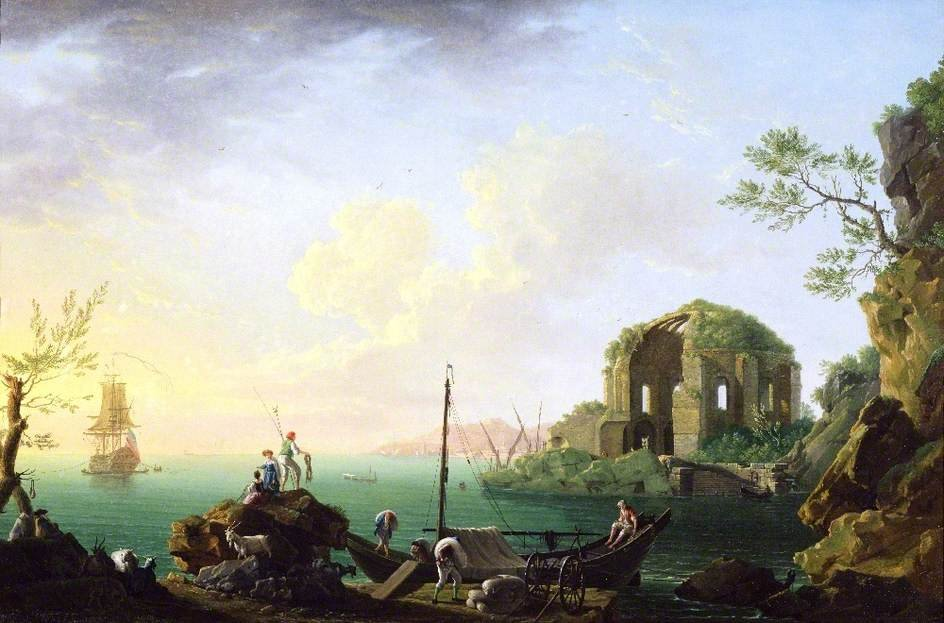
Italian Port Scene, Sunset (1770)

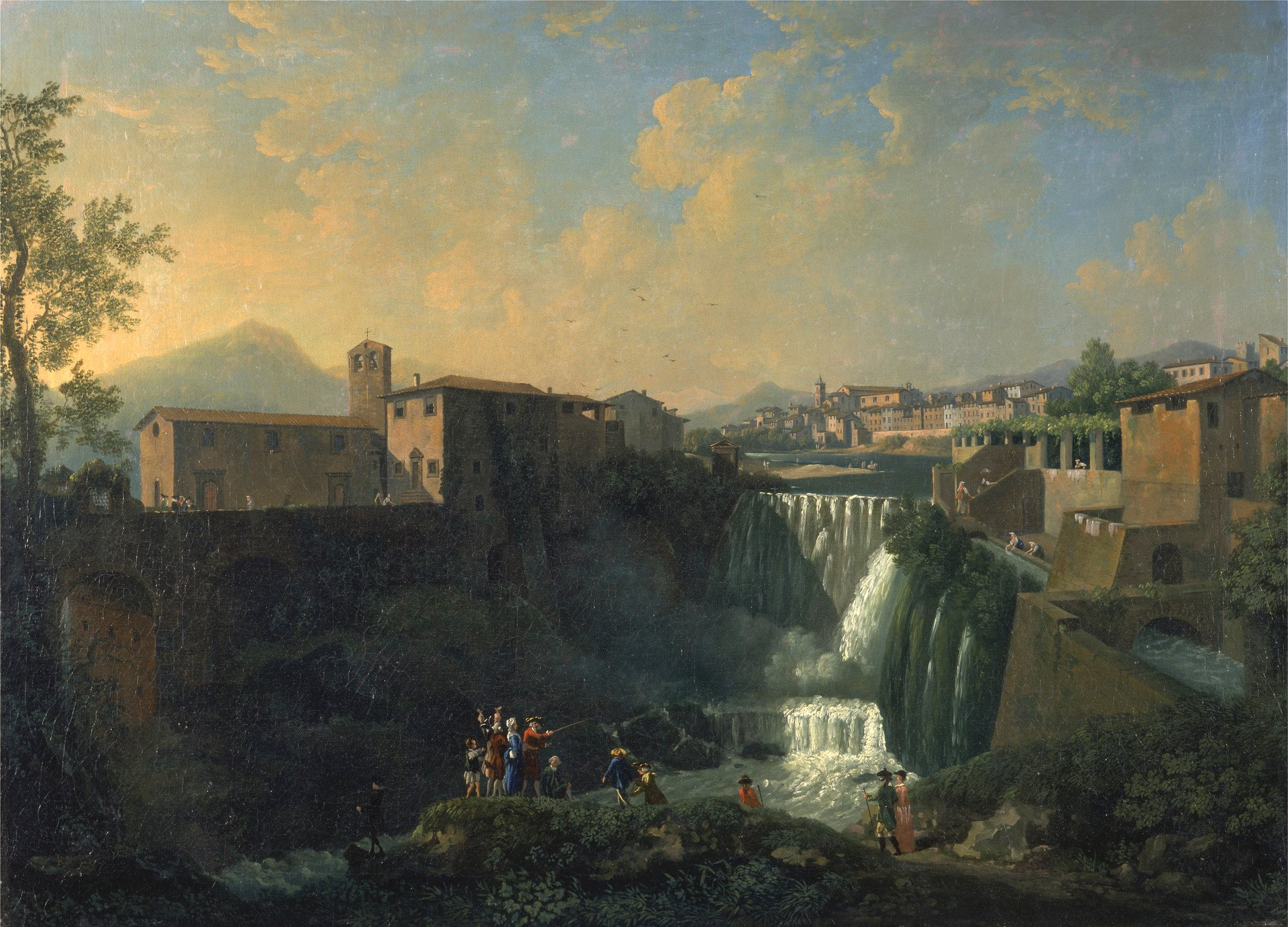
A View of Tivoli

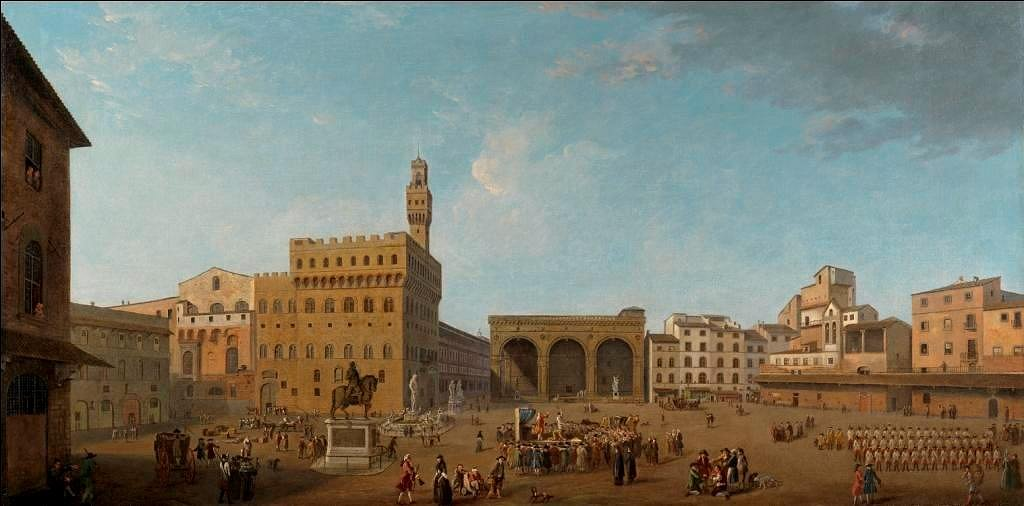
View of Piazza della Signoria

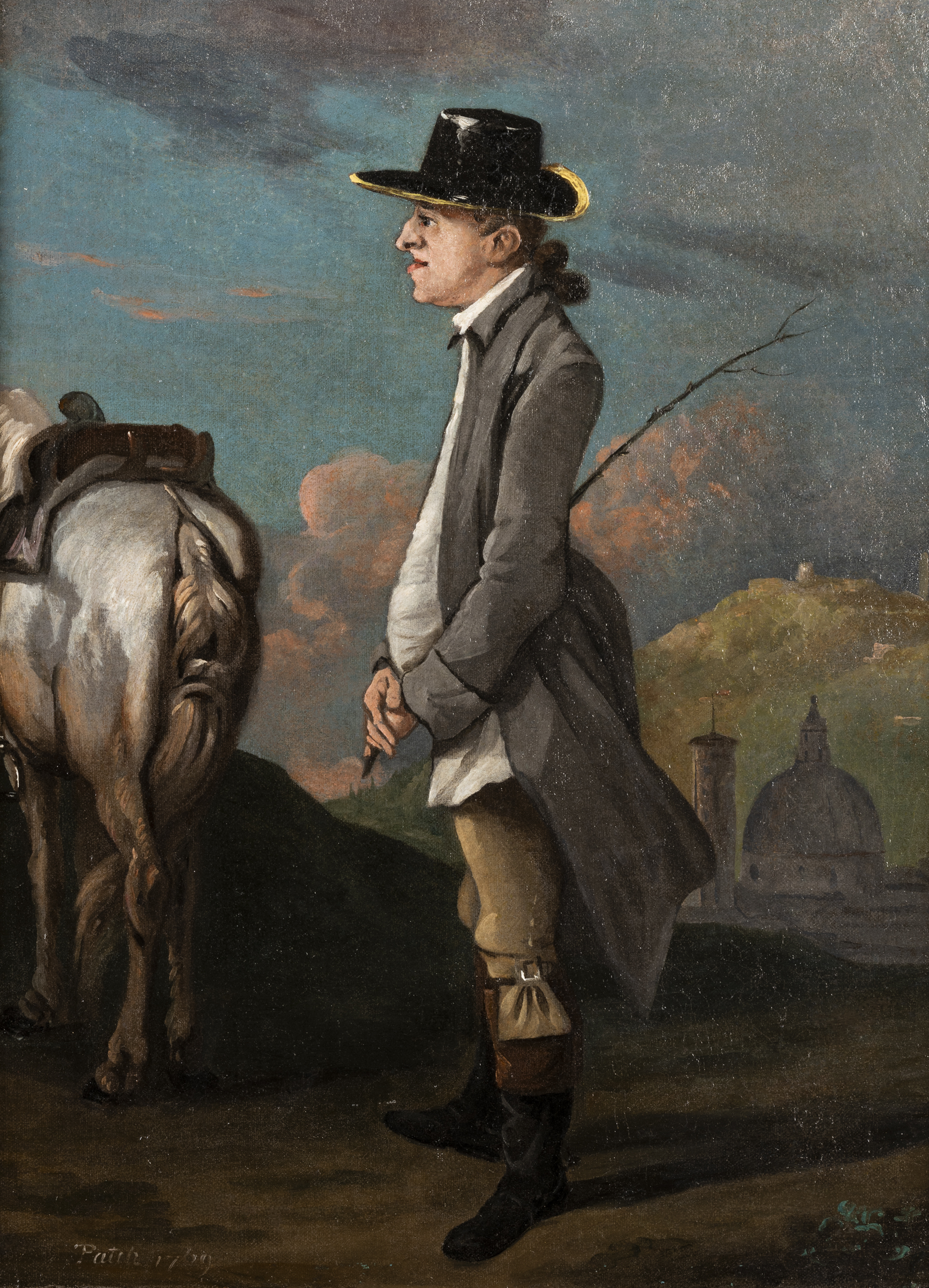
Portrait of a Gentleman on the Grand Tour (c. 1769)

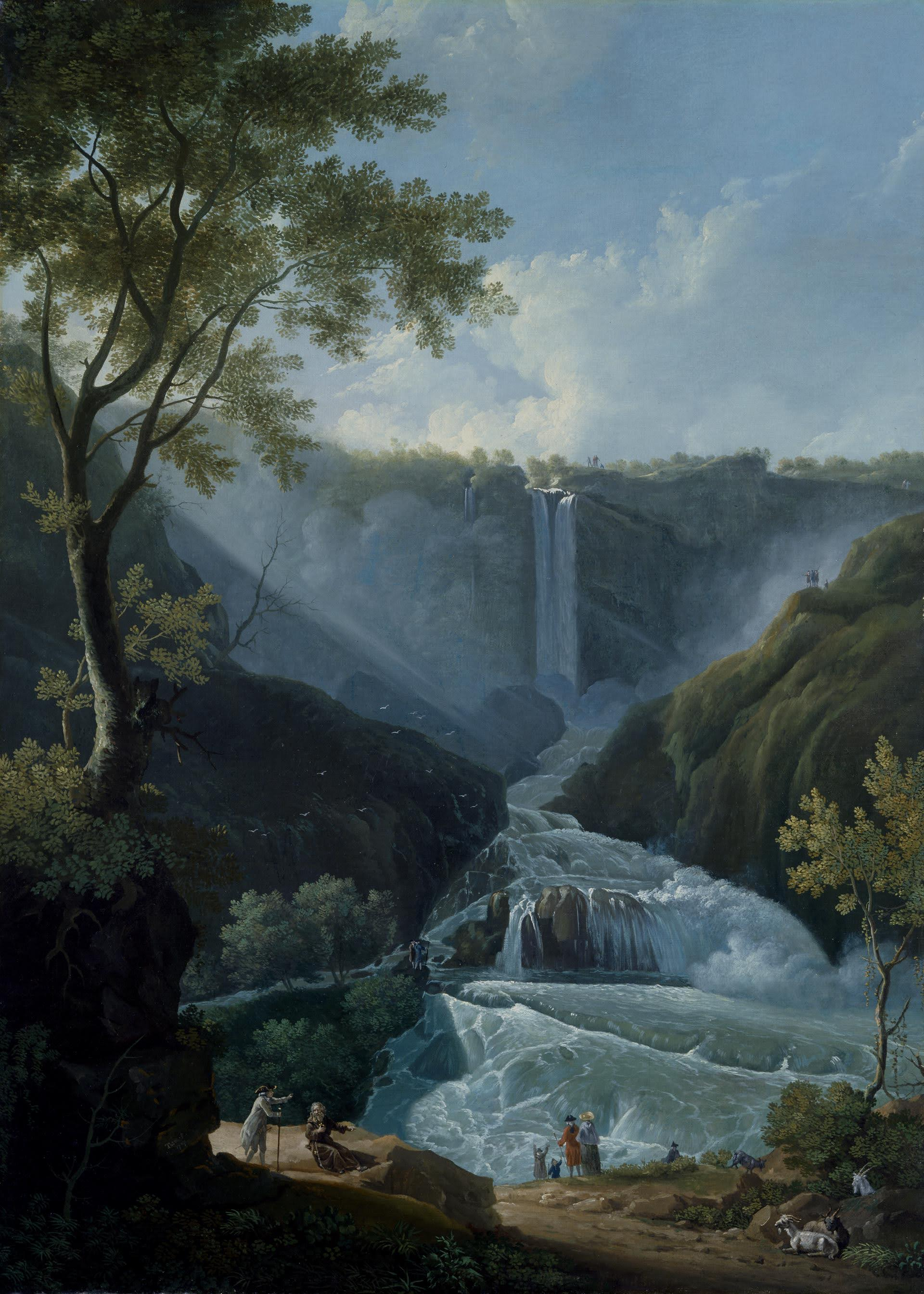
The Falls of Terni (1767)
