= Linton Park =

Grade I listed English country house

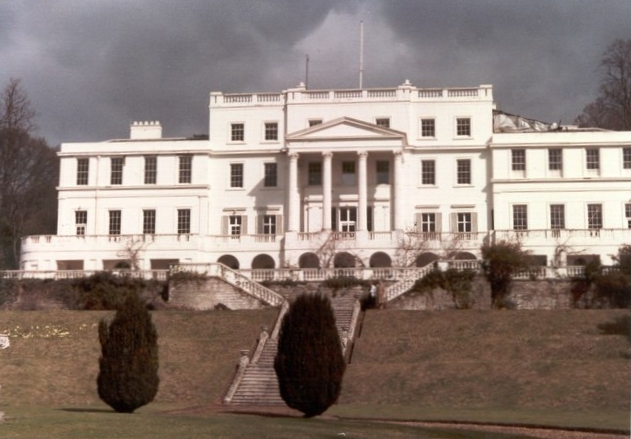
- Linton Park house from the south

- Location within Kent

General information
- Location: Linton, England
- Coordinates: 51.221739°N 0.516051°E

Linton Park, formerly Linton Place or Linton Hall, is a large 18th-century country house in Linton, Kent, England. Built by Robert Mann in 1730 to replace a much earlier building called 'Capell's Court', the estate passed through the ownership of several members of Mann's family before coming into the Cornwallis family. The house was enlarged to its current size in 1825.

The house sits in a prominent location, part way down a south-facing slope which provides excellent views of the grounds and the Weald beyond. Gardens close to the house contain formal walks laid out in 1825 with specimen trees planted then and later.

The house is a Grade I listed building and the garden and park is listed Grade II*. Other buildings and structures in the park are also listed.

From 1985, Linton Park was the corporate headquarters of Camellia Group, an international agricultural company.

== History ==
From the late 14th century, a house by the name of Capell's Court stood on the site of Linton Park. It took its name from a family of local landowners named de Capell who held the property from the late 14th century to the mid-15th century. It was then sold to the Baysden family who held it until the late 16th century, when it was sold to Sir Anthony Mayney. Mayney's grandson sold the estate to the judge Sir Francis Wythen. Wythen's daughter, Catherine, inherited the estate and, following her second marriage to Brigadier-General Sir George Jocelyn, the estate was sold to London merchant Sir Robert Mann.

Around 1730, Mann demolished Capell's Court and built the first part of the present house. On his death in 1751, the house passed to his son Edward Mann. Edward Mann died in 1775 without legitimate children and the house passed to his brother the diplomat Sir Horace Mann. Sir Horace had taken the name of the estate as his territorial designation when made a baronet in 1755, but was permanently resident in Florence. Sir Horace Mann was a friend and long-time correspondent of Horace Walpole. After a visit to Edward Mann at Linton Park in 1757, Walpole wrote to Sir Horace in Florence that: "the house is fine and stands like the citadel of Kent; the whole county is its garden." On the death of Sir Horace in 1786, the baronetcy and the house passed to his nephew, Sir Horatio Mann MP, of Boughton Place in nearby Boughton Malherbe.

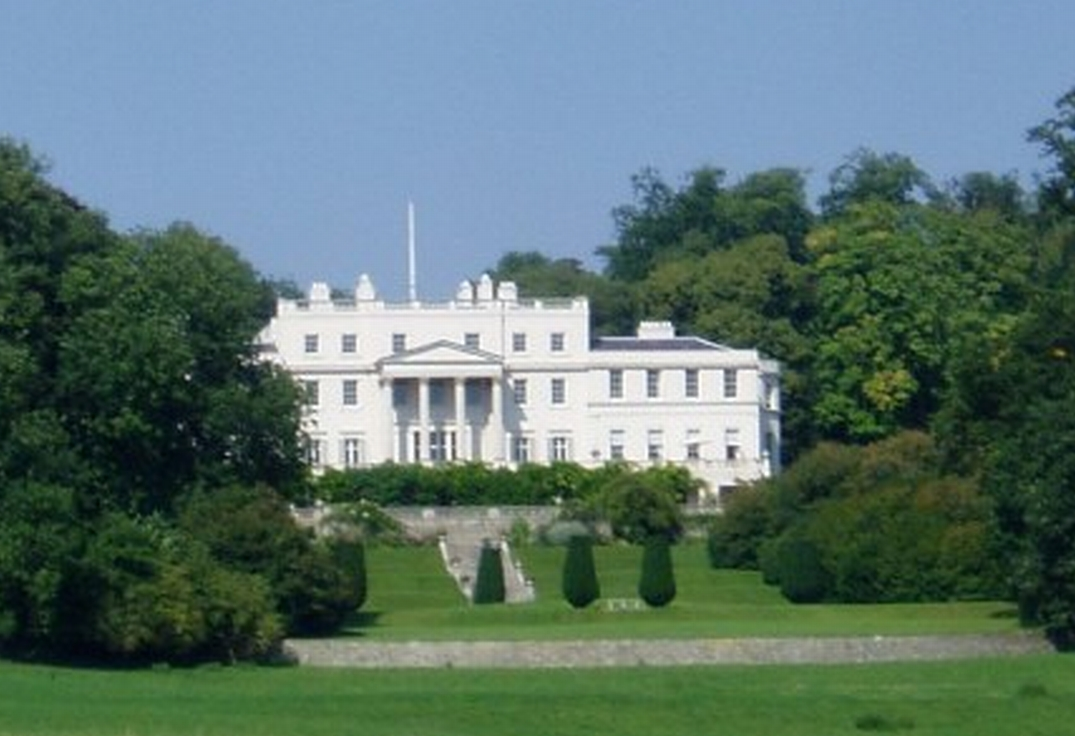
The house, seen from a distance

Sir Horatio died in 1814 and the house was inherited by James Cornwallis, Bishop of Lichfield, who was the widowed husband of Mann's older sister, Catherine. Cornwallis became the fourth Earl Cornwallis on the death of his nephew Charles Cornwallis, 2nd Marquess Cornwallis in 1823, but died himself in 1824. The estate passed to his son James, the fifth Earl. On the fifth Earl's death in 1852, the property was inherited by his daughter Julia. In 1862, she married William Amherst, Viscount Holmesdale (later, after her death in 1883, the third Earl Amherst).

By 1888, the estate was in the possession of Fiennes Stanley Wykeham Cornwallis MP (created 1st Baron Cornwallis in 1927), grandson of the fifth Earl Cornwallis's other daughter Jemima Isabella Mann. He owned the house until his death in 1935. His first son, Captain Fiennes Wykeham Mann Cornwallis MC, was killed in an IRA ambush near Gort, County Galway in 1921, and so the first baron was succeeded by his second son, Wykeham Stanley Cornwallis. The second baron sold the house in 1937 and it became the property of Olaf Hambro, a member of the Hambro banking family. Following the death of Hambro in 1961, the house was sold to the Daubeny family. The house and its nearest surrounding land were sold to the Freemasons in 1974 and were briefly operated as a school before passing into corporate ownership by Camellia Group plc in 1985.

In 2023, after extensive restoration, the house and estate were offered for sale for £32 million through agents Strutt & Parker.

== Buildings ==
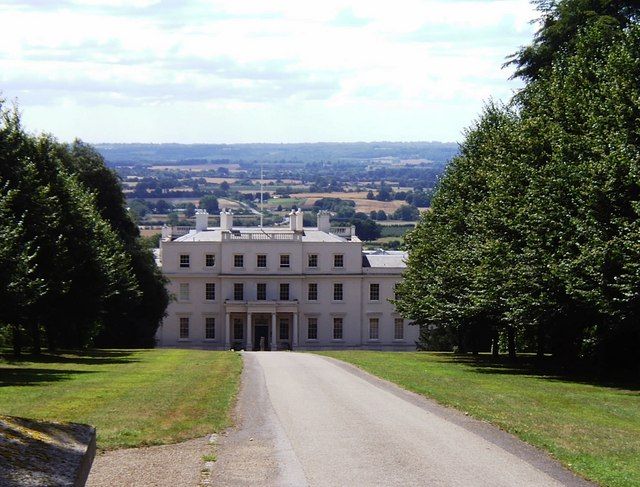
The north side of Linton Park house showing its position on an escarpment and the view beyond

Robert Mann's original 1730s house was a two-storey brick building seven bays wide with a break front. This was extended for the fifth Earl Cornwallis in 1825 by Thomas and William Cubitt. The Cubitts' alterations included adding a third storey to the original house and building two-storey wings four bays wide on each side. The house was also refinished with stucco render. Its hipped roof is covered with slates.

The entrance to the house is on the north side through a single storey portico. The north façade features tall sash windows on the ground and first floors of 12 panes; the second floor windows to the central section are shorter and of nine panes. moulded stucco cornices run above the ground and first floor windows. The east and west façades are five bays wide with a two-storey projecting bay on the east end and a single-storey projecting bay on the west end.

Due to the slope of the site, the south façade, which overlooks the main part of the grounds, stands on a raised and terraced platform with the ground floor raised to first floor level and the basement becoming the ground floor. Above the terrace, the façade has the same general arrangement as the north façade, but the wings project slightly past the central section, which has a two-storey pedimented portico. Each wing previously had a single-storey bay at its centre but these have been removed.

Internally, a number of rooms feature period wall and ceiling decorations including the entrance hall, which dates from the original 1730s building and features moulded panelling and cornices, a marble fireplace and ornamental plaster ceiling and an arabesque frieze. The stairwell is lit from above with a roof light and features a cantilevered stair with iron balusters from the 1825 adaptation with a later brass handrail.

To the north-east of the house is the estate's former stable building. This was built around the time of the fifth Earl's extension of the house and is aligned on a north–south axis. The building comprises three three-storey gable-fronted pavilions separated by a pair of two-storey wings. The façades are of brick, with the west façade painted white and the east unpainted. The roof is of slate with a clock tower in the centre of the east side of the central pavilion. Close to the stables is an underground brick-built ice house accessed by a vaulted tunnel. The ice house dates from 1788.

The main house is a Grade I listed building and the stables and the ice house are listed Grade II.

== Park ==
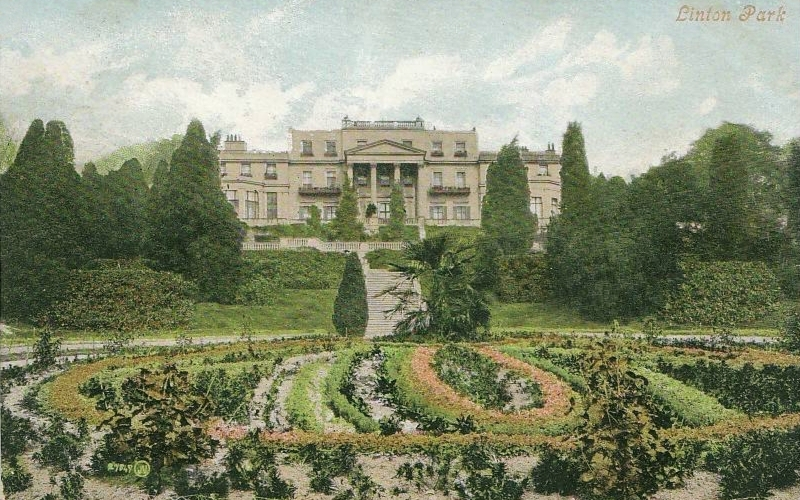
Formal gardens at Linton Park, 1906

Approached across parkland along a tree-lined drive from a lodge to the north, the house sits in a landscape of approximately 132 hectares (330 acres) of parkland, woodland and farmland part way down a south facing greensand slope overlooking the valley of the River Beult. Although now simplified without the intensive planting used in earlier centuries, elements remain of the formal gardens designed by John Claudius Loudon in 1825 that were previously arranged on the north, south-east, south and west sides of the house.

Immediately to the south of the house is a wide 100-metre (330 ft) long terrace with a stone balustrade. From the centre of this, aligned with the central portico of the house, stone steps descend in three flights over grass covered terraces to an oval lawn around the perimeter of which runs a gravel path and from which paths run to the east and west. In the centre of the lawn is a sundial. A wide lawn to the south-east of the house is ringed by paths and divided by another on a north–south axis. This is interrupted by flights of steps and a fountain pond. Two small temples are positioned amongst trees part way down the slope.

To the west of the house, Loudon laid out a flower garden. Later in the 1860s this was replanted with roses, but it is now lawns. At the south end of a walkway through this section of the garden is a water and rock garden known as "Jacobs Well". From the north end of the walk an avenue of giant sequoias planted in 1864 runs north-west towards the parish church of St Nicholas. Other Giant Sequoia are planted around the gardens. Close to the church, at the end of a paved walk is a small Gothic folly designed by Richard Bentley. South of the avenue is a grass amphitheatre cut into the slope. The southern perimeter of the formal garden is formed by a ha-ha. To the south, beyond the formal gardens, the steepness of the slope reduces and the estate continues as open parkland with a tree-fringed lake about 500 metres (1,600 ft) south of the house.

The gardens and parkland are listed Grade II*, with a number of features in the garden also individually listed for their group value with the house and park. The north lodge, the steps to the south of the house, the sundial on the oval lawn and the folly are all listed Grade II.

The estate is private property and is not open to the public, but the Greensand Way long-distance walk crosses the parkland east-west to the north of the house and a public footpath crosses the southern parkland close to the lake on a similar alignment.

== See also ==
- Grade I listed buildings in Maidstone
