= Fiennes Cornwallis, 1st Baron Cornwallis =

British politician (1864–1935)

Colonel The Right Honourable The Lord Cornwallis
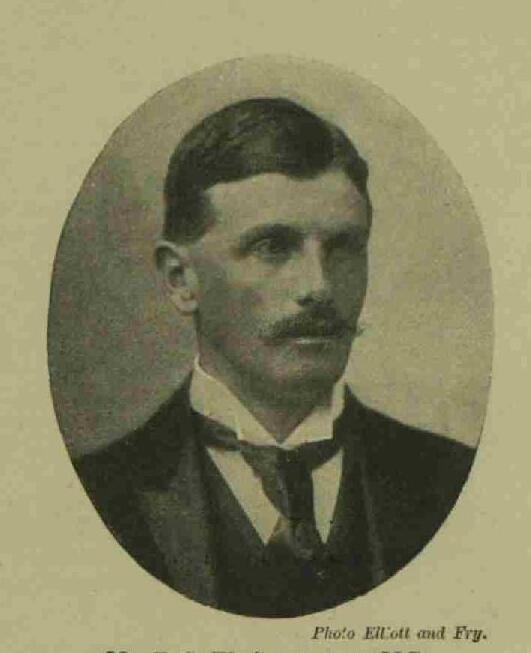
- Fiennes Cornwallis c. 1898
- Born: Fiennes Stanley Wykeham Cornwallis; 27 May 1864; Chacombe Priory, Banbury, Oxfordshire, England
- Died: 26 September 1935 (aged 71); Linton, Kent, England
- Education: Eton College
- Occupation: Politician
- Title: 1st Baron Cornwallis
- Successor: 2nd Baron Cornwallis
- Political party: Conservative
- Spouse(s): Mabel Leigh, Lady Cornwallis
- Children: 7

Colonel Fiennes Stanley Wykeham Cornwallis, 1st Baron Cornwallis, CBE, TD, JP, DL (27 May 1864 – 26 September 1935) was a British Conservative politician.

== Early life ==
Cornwallis was born 27 May 1864 at Chacombe Priory, Banbury, Oxfordshire, the eldest son of Fiennes Cornwallis, previously known as Fiennes Wykeham Martin, who had changed his name to Cornwallis after an inheritance, and his wife Harriet Elizabeth Mott. He was a grandson of Charles Wykeham Martin (born Charles Wykeham) and a great-grandson of James Mann, 5th Earl Cornwallis.

He had one brother and two sisters and was educated at Eton College.

== Political career ==
Cornwallis was elected to the House of Commons as Member of Parliament for Maidstone in 1888, a seat he held until 1895; he was elected again from 1898 until September 1900, when he was narrowly defeated by a Liberal, John Barker.

Cornwallis was vice-chairman of Kent County Council between February 1900 and May 1910, and then chairman until 1930.

In 1927 he was raised to the peerage as Baron Cornwallis, of Linton in the County of Kent, where his country house, Linton Park, was situated.

He was appointed Honorary Colonel of the Thames and Medway Heavy Brigade, Royal Artillery, on 11 March 1933.

At the time of his death, he was serving on a Royal Commission investigating tithe rent charges, which led to the Tithe Act 1936.

== Private life ==
Lord Cornwallis married Mabel Leigh, a daughter of Oswald Peter Leigh, in 1886. They had seven children, three sons and four daughters. His children were:-

- Lt. Fiennes Wykeham Mann Cornwallis, 1890–1921, who was killed in Ireland in May 1921 during the Irish War of Independence
- Wykeham Stanley Cornwallis, 1892–1982, who succeeded his father as the second Baron
- Captain Oswald Wykeham Cornwallis, R.N., 1894–1974
- Lady Julia Dorothy Cochrane, 1887–1971
- Lady Vere Mabel Steel (née Cornwallis), 1889–1964
- Hon. Yvonne Cecil 1896–1983
- Hon. Bridget Frances Kate Petherick born 1900

Lady Cornwallis died in 1957.

Cornwallis was a senior Freemason, serving as Provincial Grand Master of Kent and as Grand Warden in the United Grand Lodge of England. Stanley Wykeham Lodge was named after him.

== Notes ==
Parliament of the United Kingdom
Preceded by Alexander Henry Ross	Member of Parliament for Maidstone; 1888 – 1895	Succeeded by Sir Frederick Seager Hunt
Preceded by Sir Frederick Seager Hunt	Member of Parliament for Maidstone; 1898 – 1900	Succeeded by John Barker
Civic offices
Preceded by	Chairman of Kent County Council; 1910–1930	Succeeded by
Peerage of the United Kingdom
New creation	Baron Cornwallis; 1927–1935	Succeeded by Wykeham Cornwallis
Masonic offices
Preceded by Earl Amherst	Provincial Grand Master of Kent; 1905–1935	Succeeded by 2nd Baron Cornwallis
