= Baron Cornwallis =

Title in Peerages of England and UK

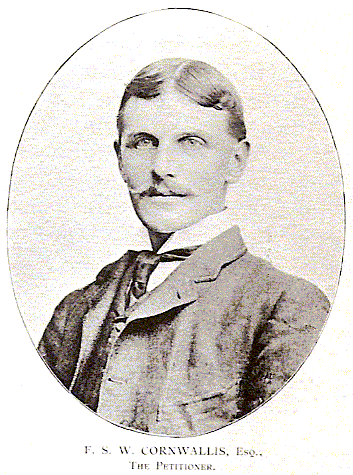
Fiennes Cornwallis, 1st Baron Cornwallis

Baron Cornwallis is a title that has been created twice, once in the Peerage of England and once in the Peerage of the United Kingdom. The holders of the first creation were later made Earl Cornwallis and Marquess Cornwallis, but these titles are now extinct. For information on the first creation, see the Earl Cornwallis.

The second creation came in the Peerage of the United Kingdom in 1927 when the Conservative politician Fiennes Cornwallis was created Baron Cornwallis, of Linton in the County of Kent. He had previously represented Maidstone in Parliament and served as chairman of the Kent County Council from 1910 to 1930. He was the son of Fiennes Cornwallis (who had been born Fiennes Wykeham-Martin but had assumed the surname of Cornwallis by Royal licence in 1859), son of Charles Wykeham-Martin and Lady Jemima Isabella, daughter of James Mann, 5th Earl Cornwallis. The first Baron's second but eldest surviving son, the second Baron, also served as chairman of the Kent County Council and was Lord Lieutenant of Kent. As of 2026 the title is held by the latter's grandson, the fourth Baron, who succeeded in March 2010. His late wife, Sara, served as Deputy Lieutenant of Perth and Kinross.

== Barons Cornwallis, First creation (1661) ==
- see Earl Cornwallis

== Barons Cornwallis, Second creation (1927) ==
- Fiennes Stanley Wykeham Cornwallis, 1st Baron Cornwallis (1864–1935)
- Wykeham Stanley Cornwallis, 2nd Baron Cornwallis (1892–1982)
- Fiennes Neil Wykeham Cornwallis, 3rd Baron Cornwallis (1921–2010)
- Fiennes Wykeham Jeremy Cornwallis, 4th Baron Cornwallis (born 1946)

The heir apparent is the present holder's son the Honourable Fiennes Alexander Wykeham Martin Cornwallis (born 1987).

== See also ==
- Earl Cornwallis
- Cornwallis (disambiguation)
