= Linton, Kent =

Village in Kent, England

Coordinates: 51.223447°N 0.510732°E

Linton
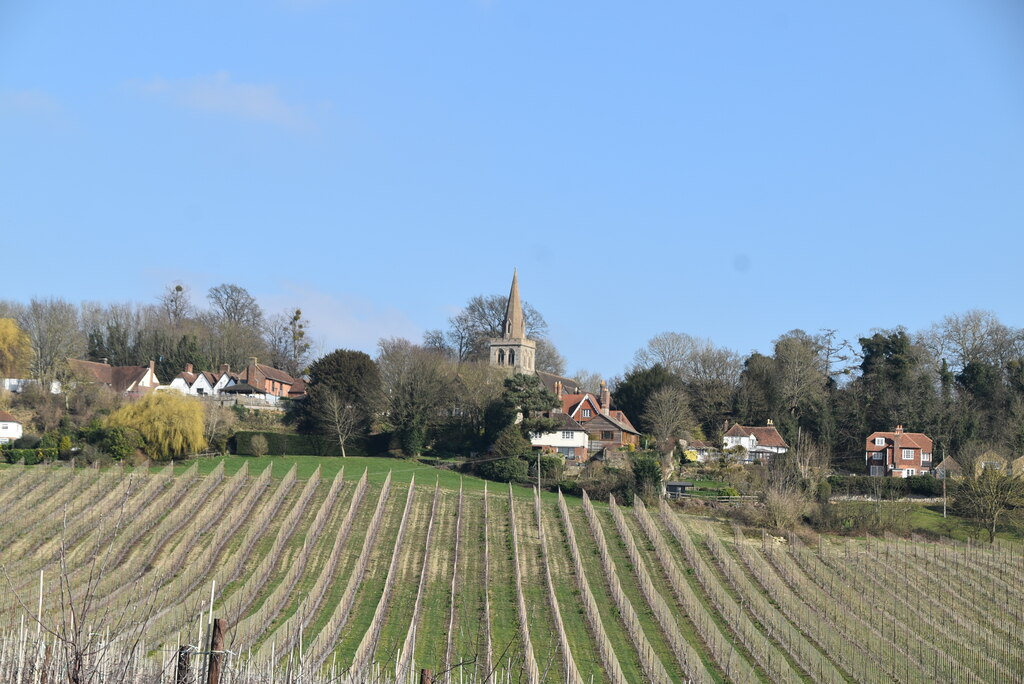
- View of Linton across the fields

- Location within Kent
- Population: 555 (2011 Census)
- OS grid reference: TQ 75418 50143
  - London: 34 miles (55 km)
- District: Maidstone
- Shire county: Kent
- Region: South East
- Country: England
- Sovereign state: United Kingdom
- Post town: Maidstone
- Postcode district: ME17
- Dialling code: 01622
- Police: Kent
- Fire: Kent
- Ambulance: South East Coast
- UK Parliament: Weald of Kent

Linton is a village and civil parish in the Maidstone District of Kent, England. The parish is located on the southward slope of the Greensand ridge, south of Maidstone on the A229 Hastings road.

The name Linton comes from Old English, probably meaning Lilla's village. The village has a population of about 500.

St Nicholas Church is a Grade II* listed building.

Linton Park is a Grade I listed mansion to the east of the village. Built in 1730 by Robert Mann, it was later home to Sir Horatio Mann, the fourth and fifth Earls Cornwallis and Fiennes Cornwallis, 1st Baron Cornwallis. It served as headquarters to the army encampment at neighbouring Coxheath during the late 18th and early 19th centuries.

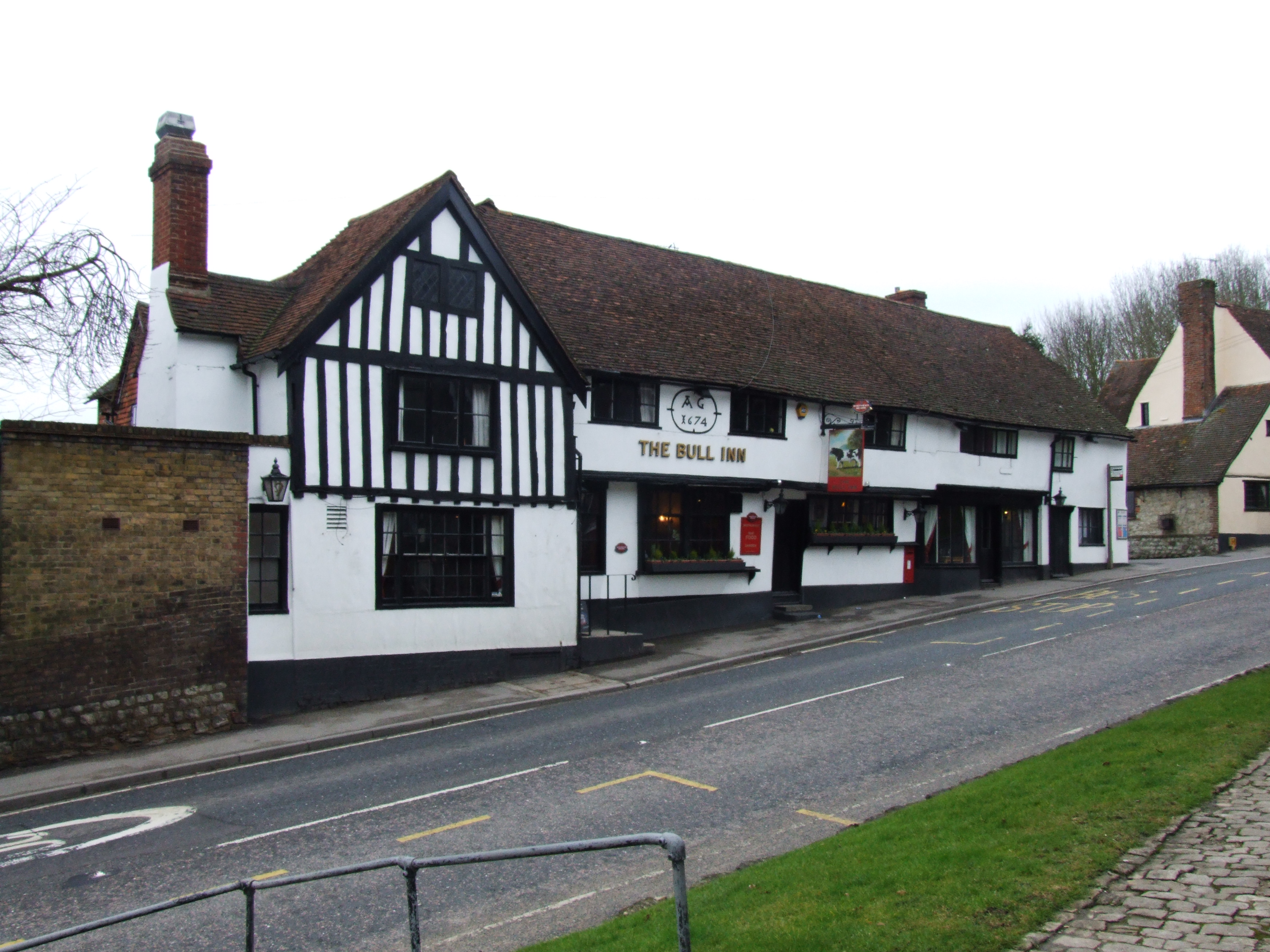
The Bull, Linton

There is one public house 'The Bull' which is opposite the church. There is a children's playground off a lane near the bottom of the hill which can be found at the end of a path just above the turning for Wheelers Lane. Cornwallis Academy is a secondary school in the village.

Linton Park Cricket Club play within the grounds of Linton Park country home. The team have won the National Village Cup on two occasions.

Linton is in a conservation area and most of the village has views across to the Weald of Kent.

== See also ==
- Listed buildings in Linton, Kent
