= Colonel Mordaunt's Cock Match =

Painting by Johann Zoffany

Colonel Mordaunts Cock Match
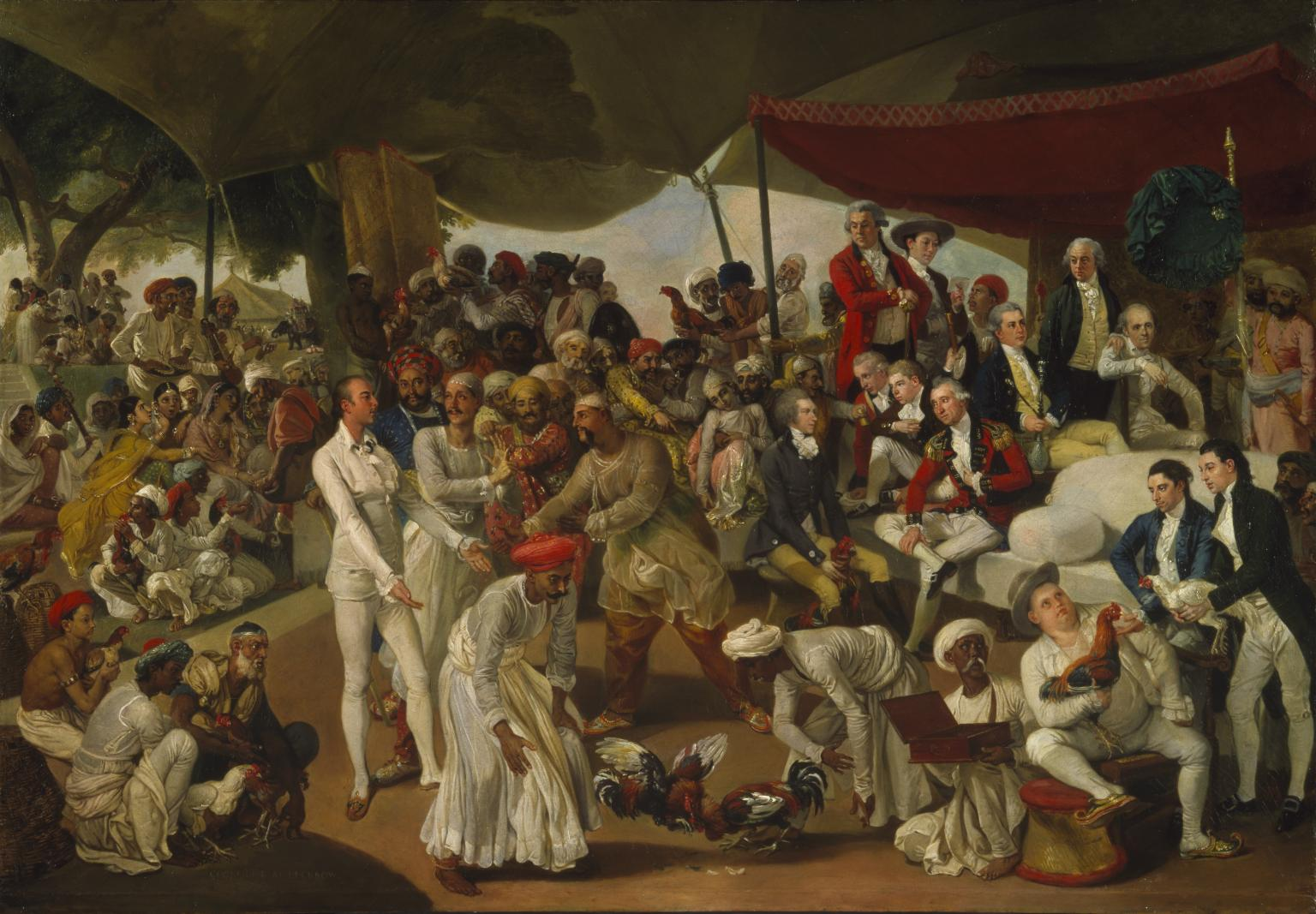
- Artist: Johan Zoffany
- Year: 1788
- Type: Oil painting
- Dimensions: 150 cm × 104 cm (59 in × 41 in)
- Location: Tate Britain, London

Colonel Mordaunt's Cock Match, sometimes called Colonel Mordaunt's Cock Fight, is a painting by the German British artist Johan Zoffany, from 1788. It records British colonial life in the Indian court of Asaf-Ud-Dowlah. The painting was completed in February 1788, four years after the event it records. The painting is part of the Tate Britain collection. A recent cleaning has revealed the original colours and made more apparent what appears to be an erection visible on the Nawab of Oudh, the central figure.

== History ==
Zoffany was a German-born painter who had become a successful portrait painter in London. Among his principal patrons were the royal family. Queen Charlotte had sent Zoffany to Florence where he had agreed to paint the Tribuna of the Uffizi. The agreed price was high and he was paid £300 a year. Zoffany stayed seven years. On his return, he brought for Queen Charlotte the painting of The Tribuna of the Uffizi that included within the body of the Uffizi a number of British residents in Florence. The painting received a cool reception because it included people who were not considered appropriate or desirable. Against advice, Zoffany had included people such as Sir Horace Mann, 1st Baronet, British consul at Florence, and the painter Thomas Patch. Patch had been expelled from Rome for a homosexual act; at this time homosexuality was illegal in the eyes of both the church and the state. One figure who was thought acceptable was George Clavering-Cowper, 3rd Earl Cowper, who is shown on the left of the painting contemplating the aesthetic virtues of the Niccolini-Cowper Madonna - which Zoffany eventually sold to him.

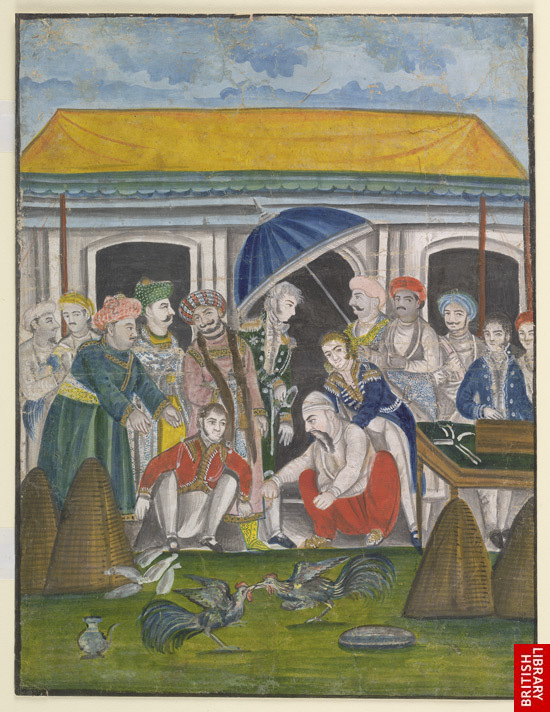
A watercolour which is thought to also show this cock fight, painted about 1830.

Zoffany had to leave the country as all of his usual commissions were no longer forthcoming. He never again got a royal commission. He had hoped to sail with Captain Cook, but as a second choice he elected to make the long journey to Lucknow. His fellow painter, Ozias Humphrey, was already painting portraits of the wealthy employees of the British East India Company and of Indian princes. He may have told Zoffany of the opportunities available in Lucknow.

In Lucknow, Zoffany met the main players at the court. The nominal head of Oudh State was Asaf-Ud-Dowlah, although the governor Warren Hastings was the British representative. He commanded the power of the British East India Company, and it was Hastings who commissioned the painting of the cockmatch by Zoffany. In time, Hastings was summoned back to England to face charges of corruption laid by Edmund Burke which took years to dismiss.

== Versions ==
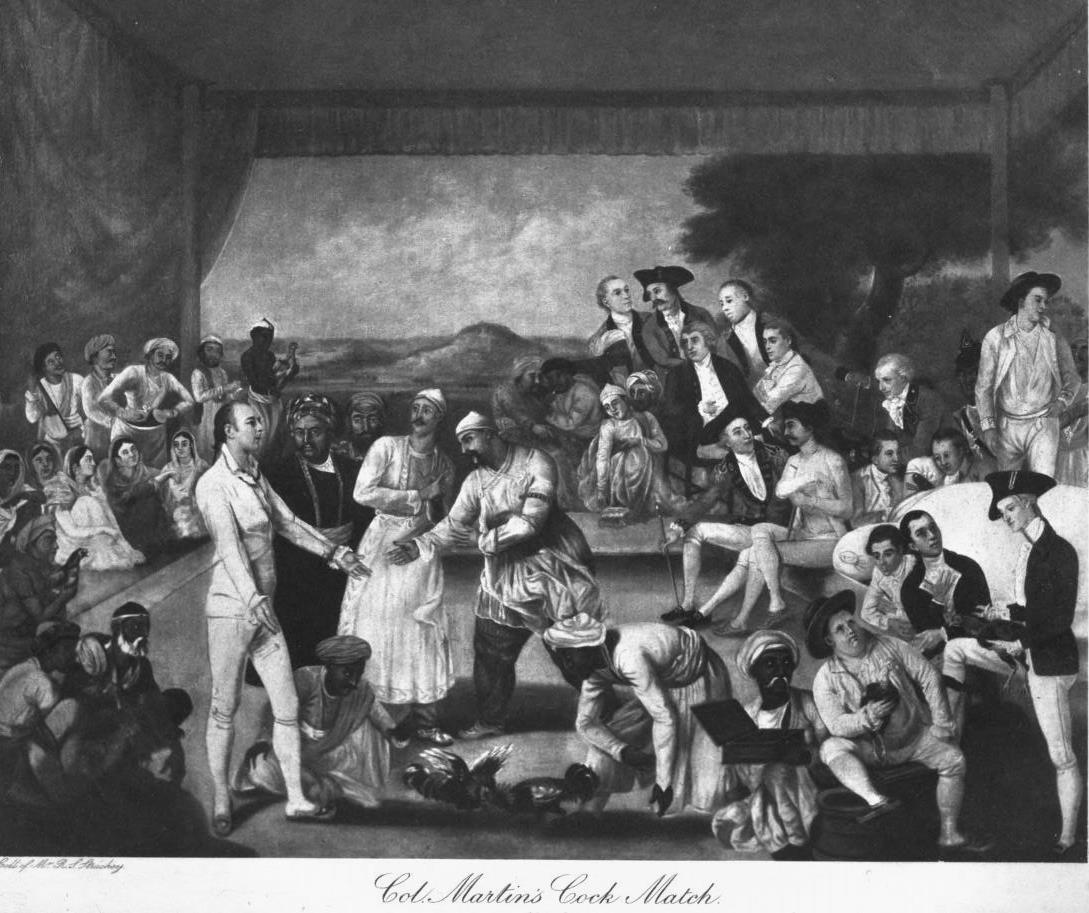
The Ashwick version – the original is lost.

There are at least two different versions of the painting of the cock match. The two attributed to Zoffany are the Daylesford version (above) and the Ashwick version. Both are clearly the same composition but the Daylesford version contains many more background figures and subtle variations. Different people are included and they are arranged in subtly different ways.

The Daylesford painting was sent back to England when it was complete. There is a story that the painting was lost at sea and recreated later by Zoffany but that is not now thought to be true. However there are other studies of the same subject. About 1790 a key was published which identifies many people in the painting. There is an engraving by Richard Earlom which is of the Daylesford version. Less well known is a painting from the Indian court which seems to show the same subject matter.

== People in the painting(s) ==
Both of Zoffany's versions of the painting show at their centre Asaf-Ud-Dowlah, the Nawab. This man was held in very low regard, but he was the nominal head of state. His favourites included Colonel John Mordaunt and Claude Martin. Mordaunt was the illegitimate and nearly illiterate son of the Earl of Peterborough. He had managed to be assigned to Warren Hastings and through him he was appointed head of security. His real role however included organising entertainments. Mordaunt and his employer were said to have shown the same low tastes in entertainment. Even at that time, cockfighting was not well regarded in British society. Mordaunt had arranged for British birds to be brought to India, where he used them to take on local cockerels.

Claude Martin was a Frenchman who had switched sides to the British. Clever and skilful, Martin is shown on the right sitting on a couch. Martin's contemporaries shown in both versions of the painting include the Frenchman Antoine Polier. Polier made his fortune in Lucknow which he eventually took back to France. He was unlucky enough to arrive in the middle of the French Revolution and he was stabbed to death at Poitiers for being a noble. Wombwell (on the right) was the local paymaster.

Zoffany is included in the painting, as is Ozias Humphrey, although in the Ashwick version Zoffany is more surreptitious and the figure of Humphrey has been thought to be a Lieutenant Humphrey. Both versions include a scene where a young Moslem boy is being publicly embraced by a Hindu man. A nearby spectator appears to be held back from expressing his indignation. Another detail is the sexual arousal of Asaf-Ud-Dowlah. This detail is said to be more obvious now that the painting has been cleaned. Some say this may be Warren Hastings' joke to show the Nawab of Awadh in this way. His homosexuality is well recorded. His favourite, Hasan Raza Khan, is the figure in the red turban who is at the centre of the scene. He is said to have hundreds of wives whom he ignored and he died without children.

Claude Martin, in a letter to Ozias Humphrey, made an interesting observation on Colonel Mordaunt's role:

Colonel Mordaunt is now at the vizier's court, hunting, fighting cocks and doing all he can to please the Nabob in the expectation of being paid the large sums due to him by the Prince... although the Prince has dark and sinister intentions, but I fear much of his success, as the vizier is not much willing to pay his debts particularly to Europeans for what I know of his character I think it such that if one could read in his heart then one would perceive it loaded with many dark and sinister intentions and as you know those that compose his court you then ought to know what man he is. A man that delight in Elephant and Cocks fighting would delight in something worse if he feared nothing.
