= Venus with a Satyr and Two Cupids =

Painting by Annibale Carracci

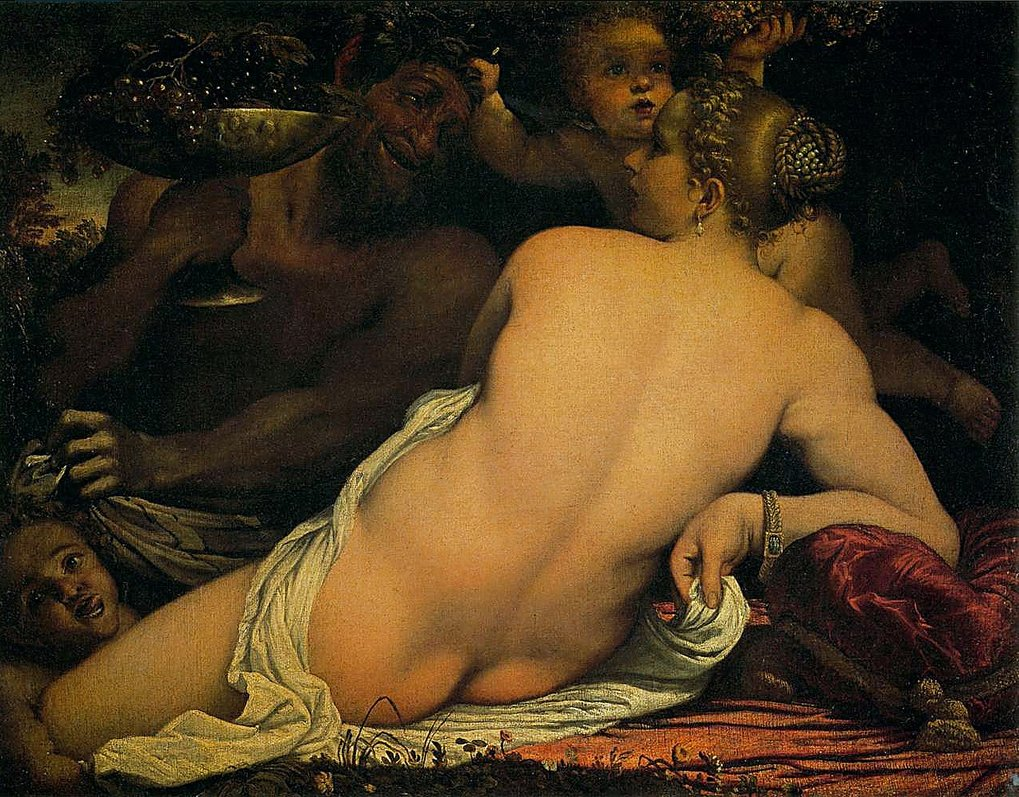
Venus with a Satyr and Two Cupids (ca. 1588–1590) by Annibale Carracci

Venus with a Satyr and Two Cupids or The Bacchante (La Baccante) is an oil painting on canvas executed ca. 1588–1590 by the Italian painter Annibale Carracci, now in the Uffizi in Florence. Its dating is based on its strong Venetian influence – the artist was briefly in the city at the end of the 1580s.

The work is first recorded in 1620, when the Bolognese gentleman Camillo Bolognetti sold it to an emissary from Cosimo II de' Medici, Grand Duke of Tuscany. It was then taken to Florence and remained in the Medici collections, displayed in the Tribuna of the Uffizi and appearing in the top left of Johann Zoffany's painting of the same name beside Guido Reni's Charity and directly above Raphael's Madonna della Seggiola. Because of its erotic charge, the painting was covered during the 18th century by another canvas and not uncovered until early in the 19th century.

== Description and analysis ==
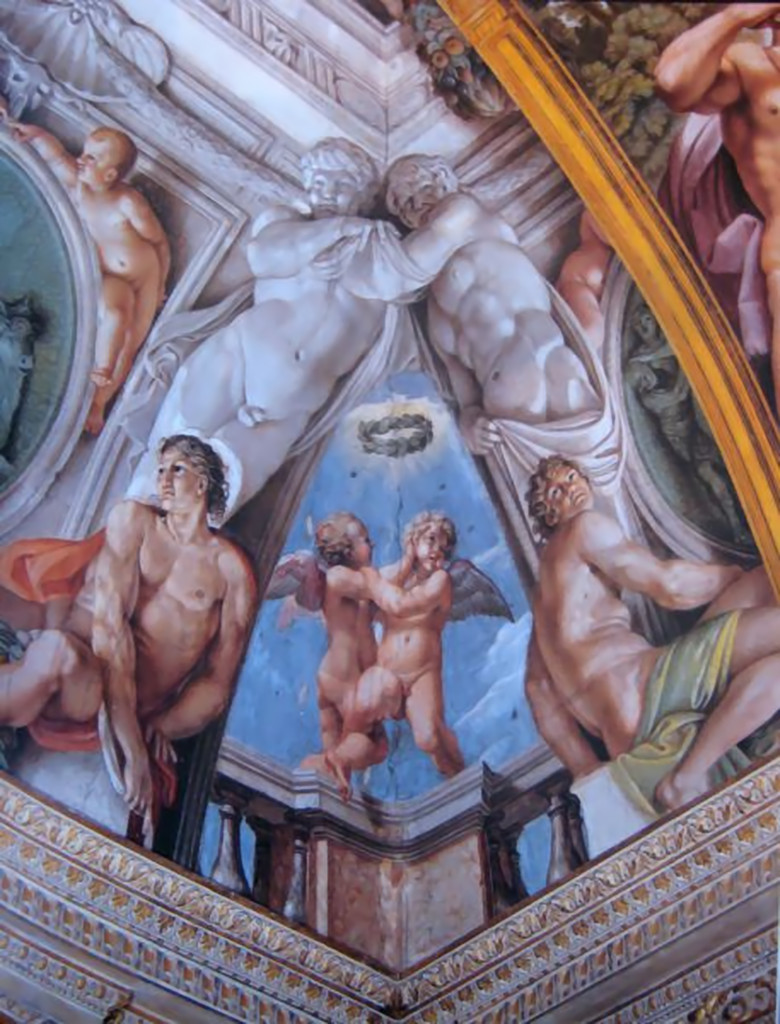
Annibale Carracci, Eros and Anteros, 1597–1601, Rome, Palazzo Farnese, part of the fresco cycle The Loves of the Gods

Given the explicit sensuality of the painting, a sexual allusion has been detected in the work, further underlined by the contrast between the opulent and pink forms of Venus with the dark ones of the satyr, in turn an emblem of erotic instinct, and by the satyr's offering to the goddess of a cup of grapes, the Dionysian fruit par excellence.

These are recurring themes in "chamber" paintings, intended for the strictly private spaces of stately homes and often characterised by themes of erotic content, for the delight of the master of the house.

Although it is hardly doubtful that the painting also has this value, at the same time, a moral subtext has been perceived in it. Indeed, it is noticeable that the goddess avoids the satyr's approach and instead modestly covers herself with a white cloth. But it is above all the action of the two putti that reveals this edifying aspect. The one on the bottom left grabs Venus' thigh – almost as if to support the satyr's attack – and sticks out his tongue in a lascivious (but also slightly comical) pose, the other, on the top right, arrives in flight and grabs the satyr by the horns, stopping his momentum.

The two putti, therefore, are none other than Eros and Anteros, in perpetual conflict with each other, as is the continuous struggle between the "low" instincts of the body and passions (Eros) and the high inspirations of spiritual and virtuous love (Anteros). As the morality of the time dictates, the palm of victory is destined for Anteros, who in fact is about to crown Venus with a garland.

The Venus in this painting may be understood as the "Celestial Venus", that is, that facet of the goddess who embodies the "noble" aspects of love – which ultimately refer to the love of God – as opposed to the "Earthly Venus" (or "Vulgar") which, on the contrary, symbolizes the "worse" aspects of this feeling: vanity, the transience of passions and lasciviousness.

== Stylistic references ==
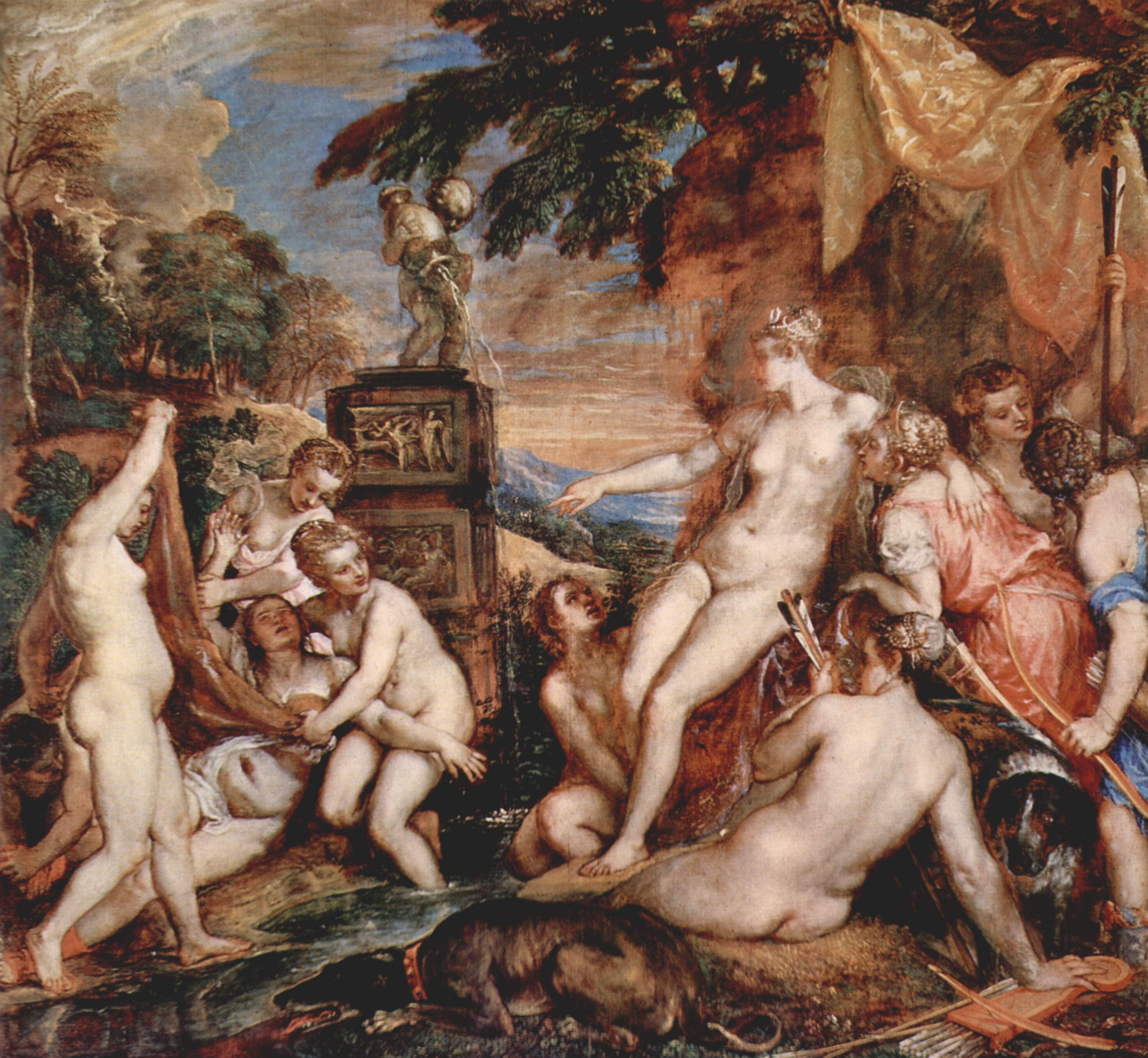
Tiziano, Diana and Callisto, 1559, Madrid, Museo del Prado

The Uffizi's Venus reveals the strong influence that Venetian painting had on Annibale Carracci in the period from the end of the 1580s until his move to Rome (in 1595).

The subject matter itself is proof of this, as the Venetian tradition of paintings of Venus (and other mythological figures) with their provocative nudity is extremely rich. The same can be said for the chromatic ranges of reds, browns, and golds, whose reaction to light produces distinctive tonal effects.

It has been hypothesized that the figure of Venus was taken from that of a nymph appearing (bottom right) in Titian's masterpiece Diana and Callisto (1559). Annibale certainly could not have had direct knowledge of this painting, which was sent to Spain the year it was executed. However, there is an engraving by Cornelis Cort, who may have been the model followed by Carracci. The painting adopts several of the details, such as Venus's hairdo, which features pearls, and the small patch of grass at the bottom, where daisies are sprouting.

The many known copies of this painting testify to the appreciation it received: among these, the one in the Chrysler Museum of Art, in Virginia, stands out, of such quality that some consider it to be an autograph replica by Annibale himself. This copy, moreover, bears the inscription "Annibale Carracci 1588" on the back. According to some authors, this circumstance would allow for an "ad annum" dating of the Uffizi canvas. Others, however, consider this fact compatible with the hypothesis, based on stylistic considerations, that it is from a few years later than that date.

Thematically related to the Uffizi canvas is an engraving by Carracci, from a few years later, depicting, according to two different interpretations, "Venus threatened by a satyr" or "Jupiter and Antiope".

== Gallery ==
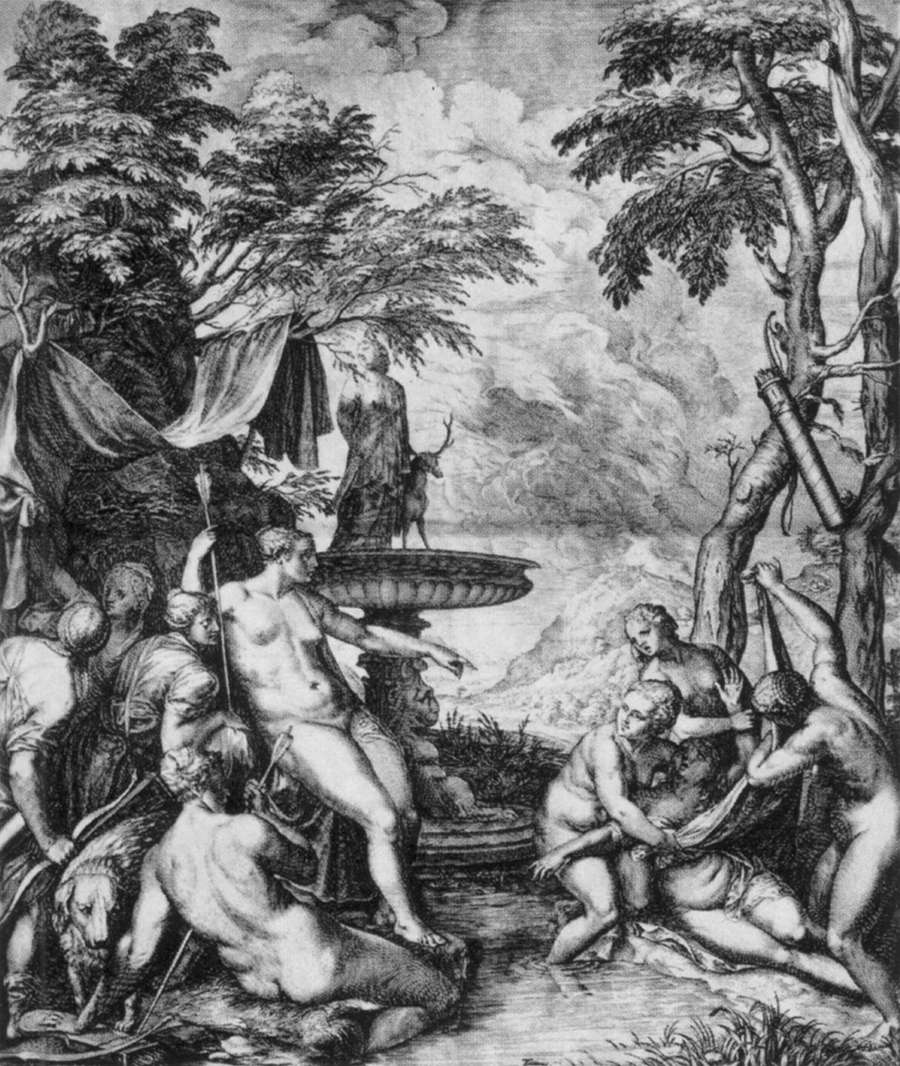
Cornelis Cort (after Titian), Diana and Callisto, 1566, British Museum, London

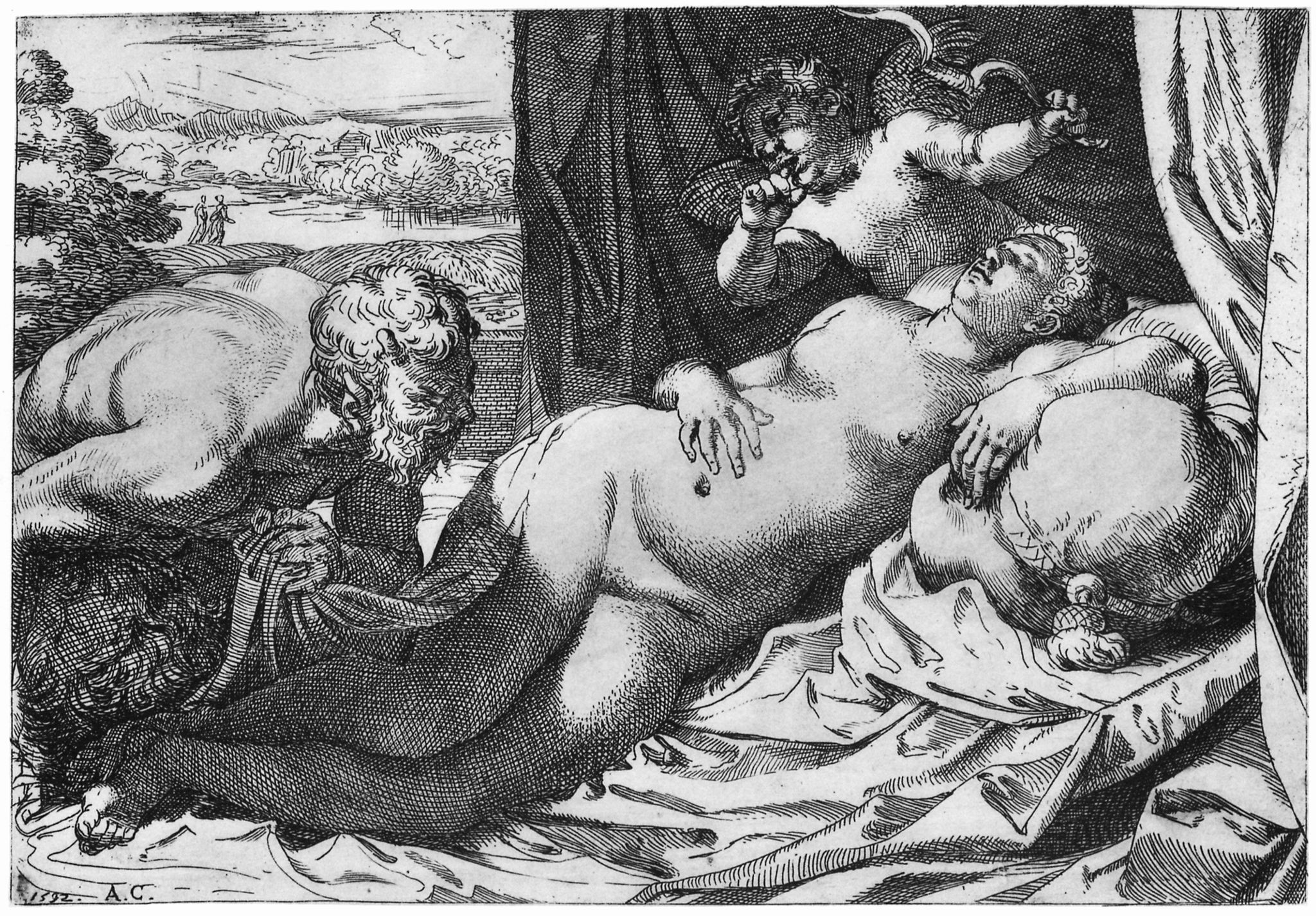
Annibale Carracci, Jupiter and Antiope or Venus Uncovered by a Satyr, 1592, Staatliche Kunsthalle Karlsruhe

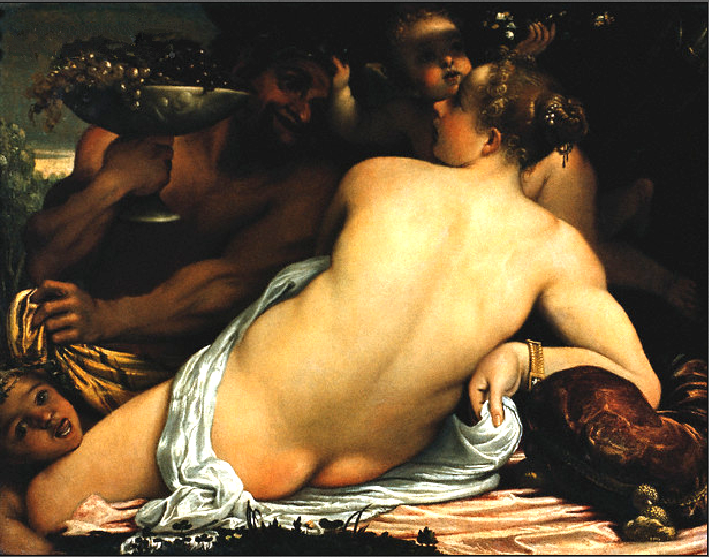
The Chrysler Museum copy or replica
