= Charles Loraine Smith =

British artist and politician (1751-1835)

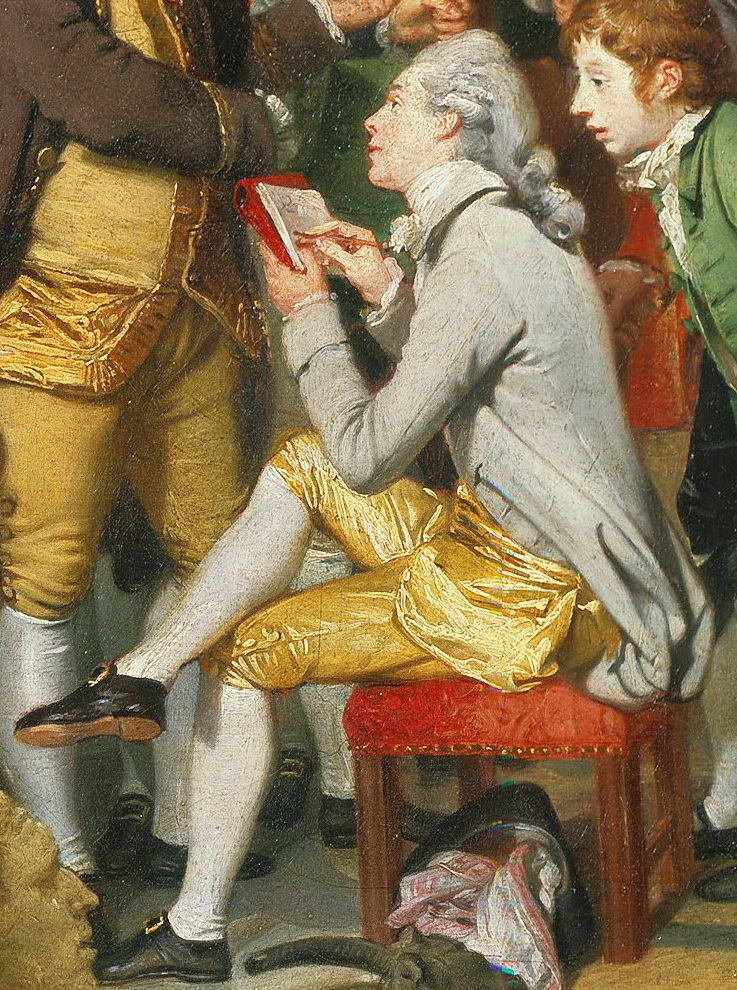
- Smith in The Tribuna of the Uffizi
- Born: 1 April 1751; Kirkharle, Northumberland, England
- Died: 24 August 1835 (aged 84)
- Spouse: Elizabeth Ann Skrine

Charles Loraine Smith (1 April 1751 – 24 August 1835) was a British artist and politician. He inherited his family seat in Enderby, Leicestershire while still a boy. He was a keen horseman and his paintings of animals are well regarded. He painted both parodies and more serious subjects. He served in the British parliament, was mentioned in a divorce case, met the pope and rose to be a High Sheriff of Leicestershire.

== Life ==
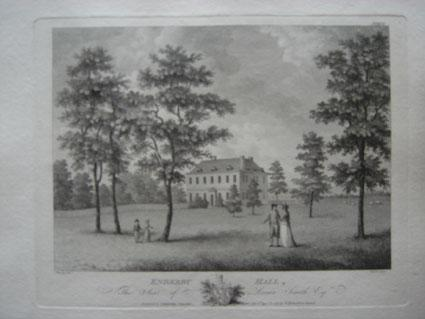
Enderby Hall by J. Throsby

Charles Loraine was born in 1751. His father was Sir Charles Loraine, the 3rd baronet of Kirk Harle, and his family's seat became Enderby Hall near Leicester when he gained an inheritance from his great uncle Richard Smith of Enderby. He took his great-uncle's name by an act of Parliament in 1762 whilst still a boy. Loraine attended Eton College and Christ's College, Cambridge.

Smith eloped with Frances Carpenter, Countess of Tyrconnel. This elopement was cited in the divorce of the Earl and Countess of Tyconnel in 1777.

When Smith was in Florence he posed for a painting by Johann Zoffany of The Tribuna of the Uffizi. Smith is shown in a group with Zoffany, who is showing a painting by Raphael now called the Niccolini-Cowper Madonna after Earl Cowper, who is also in the group. Zoffany's painting was a commission for Queen Charlotte, and Zoffany had decided to include quite a few British people who lived in or who were visiting Florence. Smith stood as a member of Parliament just once in 1784 for Leicester. He supported Pitt the Younger's plans for reform, and he gave a number of speeches on the subjects of India, Canada and against the receipts tax and the slave trade.

Smith and his wife Elizabeth's first child, Charles Crayle, was born in 1782 and died young. In 1783 Smith became the High Sheriff of Leicestershire. His other child was Loraine Smith born in 1784. That same year Smith sold the estate at Oddington which had been left to his wife by Crayle Crayle in 1780.

== Artist ==
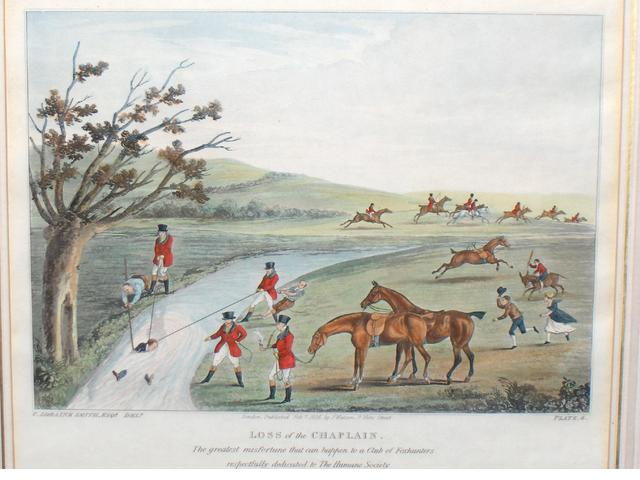
Loss of the Chaplain, a Charles Loraine Smith fox-hunt parody

The National Portrait Gallery has a copy of a print of a drawing by Smith, whilst Leicester Museums has an oil painting by Smith of the Billesdon Coplow Run. The Coplow run was a race on horseback for fox huntsmen that was celebrated in verse by the poetic bishop Robert Lowth.

Smith used his knowledge of fox hunting and his artistic skills to paint parodies. His titles included Loss of the Chaplain and his 1822 The Rendezvous of the Smoking Hunt at Braunstone. The latter parodies how fox hunting had become so fashionable that riders might smoke, even though this might prevent the dogs from finding the fox's scent. These paintings were produced as prints with engraving by J.Watson.

== Celebrity ==
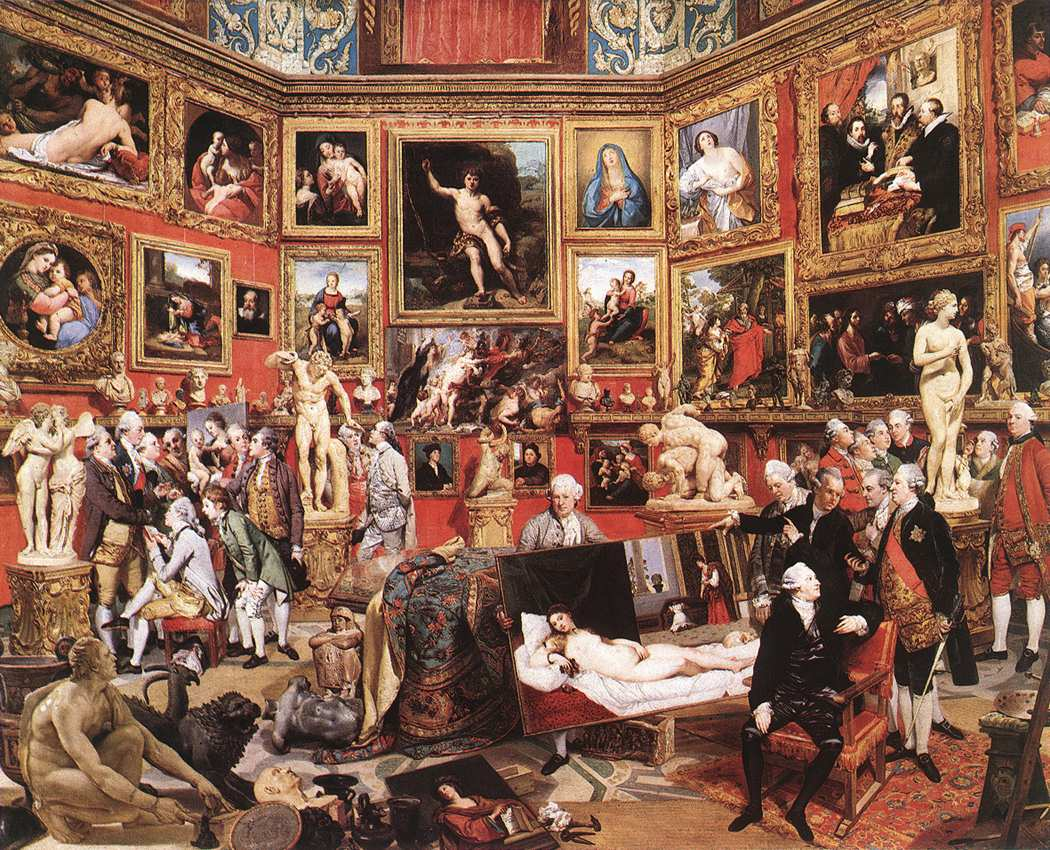
The Tribuna of the Uffizi by Johann Zoffany. Place cursor over artworks or persons to identify them.

Smith was a celebrity because of his interest in fox hunting. He was a good friend of Hugo Meynell, who was called "the first foxhunter in the kingdom". Meynell was the master of the Quorn Hunt and Smith was entrusted with that role in Meynell's absence. Smith wrote a self-deprecating poem on his skills, but there were several poems written and published about his exploits by others.

Loraine and Lord Maynard were there, and can tell
Who in Justice's scale holds the balance so well
As very good judges and justices too
The state of each horse, and what each man did do:
But if any one thinks he is quizzed in the song
And fancies his case stated legally wrong
To Enderby Hall let him go and complain
But he'll not mend his case, if he meets with Loraine.

His skills as a horseman enabled him to sell horses for large sums. He sold one horse for three hundred pounds.

== Death, resurrection and death ==
He was reputedly grateful for being in good health to his 85th year. Smith died on Sunday 23 August 1835 in his armchair. His celebrity was such that not only was a poem published in good humour about his imagined death many years before the event, but another poem which imagined his resurrection was written by Mr Heyrick in light-hearted reply.

Oh !how could you bury our neighbour so soon !
Why, his boots were just black'd, and his fiddle in tune.
As a staunch, steady sportsman, and quite orthodox.
He'd been taking a glass to the hounds and the fox :
In his moments of mirth, he would sometimes drink deep;
When you thought he was dead — he was only asleep!

Parliament of Great Britain
Preceded by Shukburgh Ashby; Booth Grey	Member of Parliament for Leicester; 1784–1790; With: John Macnamara 1784–1790	Succeeded by Samuel Smith; Thomas Parkyns
Honorary titles
Preceded by Sir John Palmer	High Sheriff of Leicestershire; 1783–1784	Succeeded by Charles Grave Hudson, 1st Baronet
