= Charity (Reni, Florence) =

Painting by Guido Reni

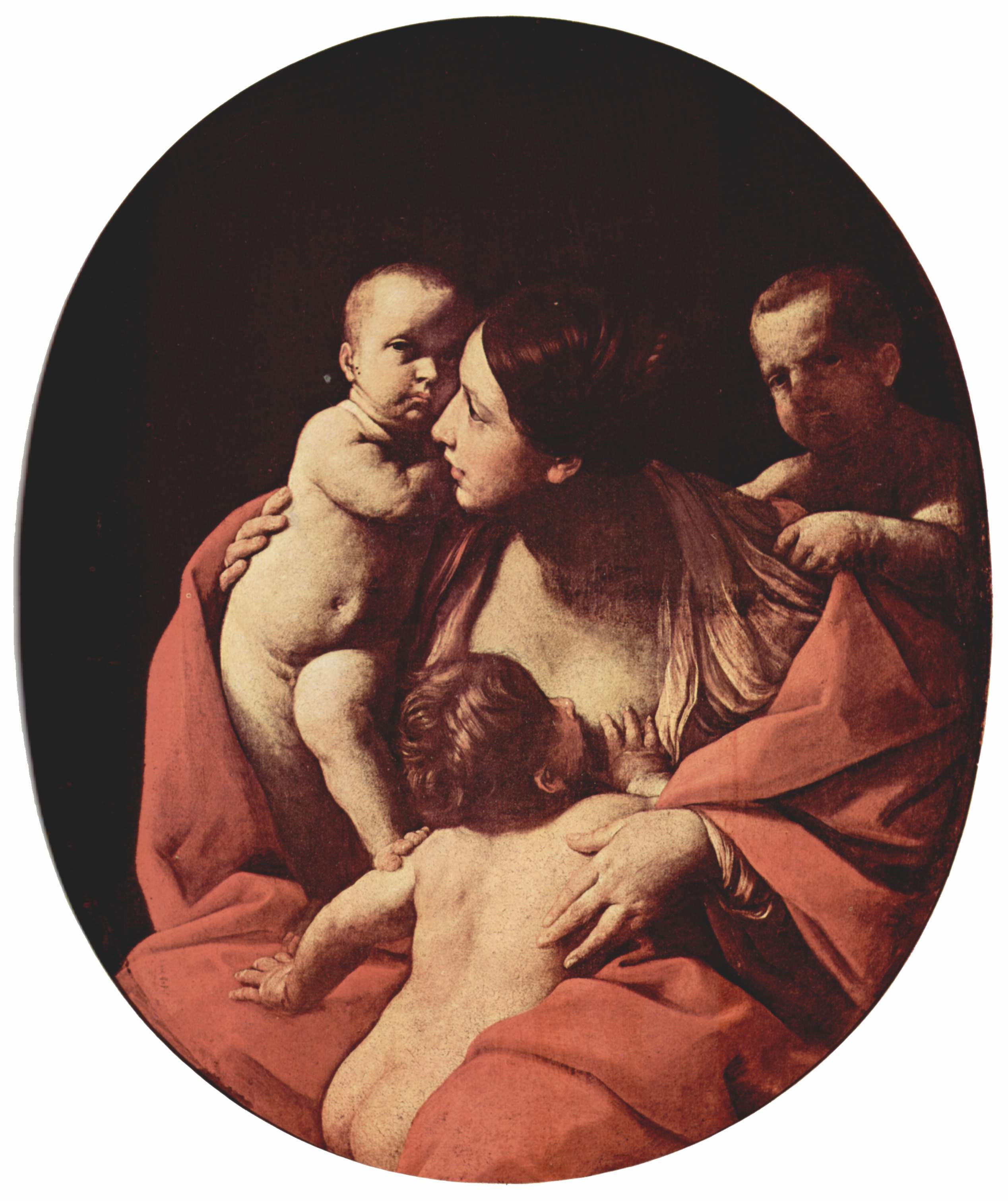
Charity (c. 1611) by Guido Reni

Charity is a c. 1611 oil on canvas painting by Guido Reni, now in the Galleria Palatina in Florence. It passed into the main Medici collections from that of cardinal Leopoldo de' Medici on his death in 1675. It appears at the top left of Johann Zoffany's Tribuna of the Uffizi (1772–1778).
