= Madonna and Child with Saint Catherine of Alexandria =

Painting by Titian's workshop

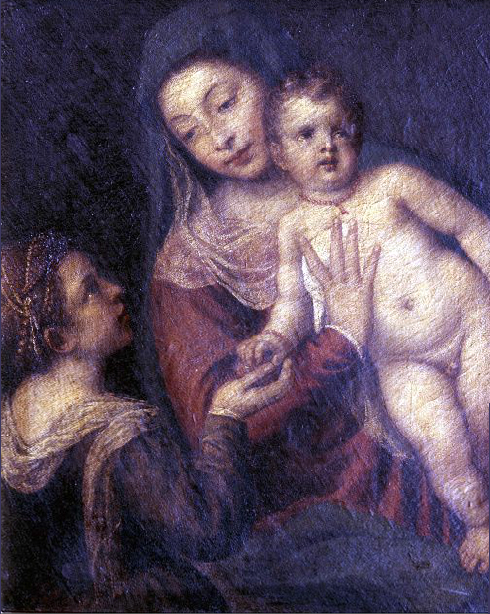

Madonna and Child with Saint Catherine of Alexandria is a c.1550 oil on panel painting by the studio of Titian, now in the Galleria degli Uffizi (catalogue number 949). It was restored around the end of the 18th century, when the present carved and gilded frame was probably added.

Titian often returned to this subject - one work each in the Hermitage Museum and the Museo nazionale di Capodimonte uses the same composition with Mary Magdalene in place of Saint Catherine. It is first recorded in cardinal-deacon Carlo de' Medici's collections and appeared in an inventory of goods made on his death in 1666, upon which it entered the Uffizi. It appears in Johann Zoffany's 1776 Tribuna of the Uffizi.

The art historians Crowe and Cavalcaselle attributed the work to Titian's nephew Marco Vecellio, whilst the 1926 Uffizi catalogue edited by Giovanni Poggi attributed to the school of Titian. Harold Wethey disagreed with both conclusions, arguing it was an early copy of a lost autograph work by Titian himself

== Bibliography ==
- (in Italian) in Grazia Agostini and others, Tiziano nelle Gallerie fiorentine / Comitato promotore per le manifestazioni espositive Firenze e Prato, Firenze, Centro Di, 1978, n. 50 (article by Mina Gregori)
- (in Italian) Gallerie degli Uffizi, Gli Uffizi: Catalogo generale, Firenze, Centro Di, 1980, p. 350 [1979]
- (in Italian) Lionello Puppi, Per Tiziano, Milano, Skira, 2004
- (in Italian) Neri Pozza, Tiziano, Costabissara, A. Colla, 2012
