= The Tribuna of the Uffizi (Zoffany) =

Painting by Johan Zoffany

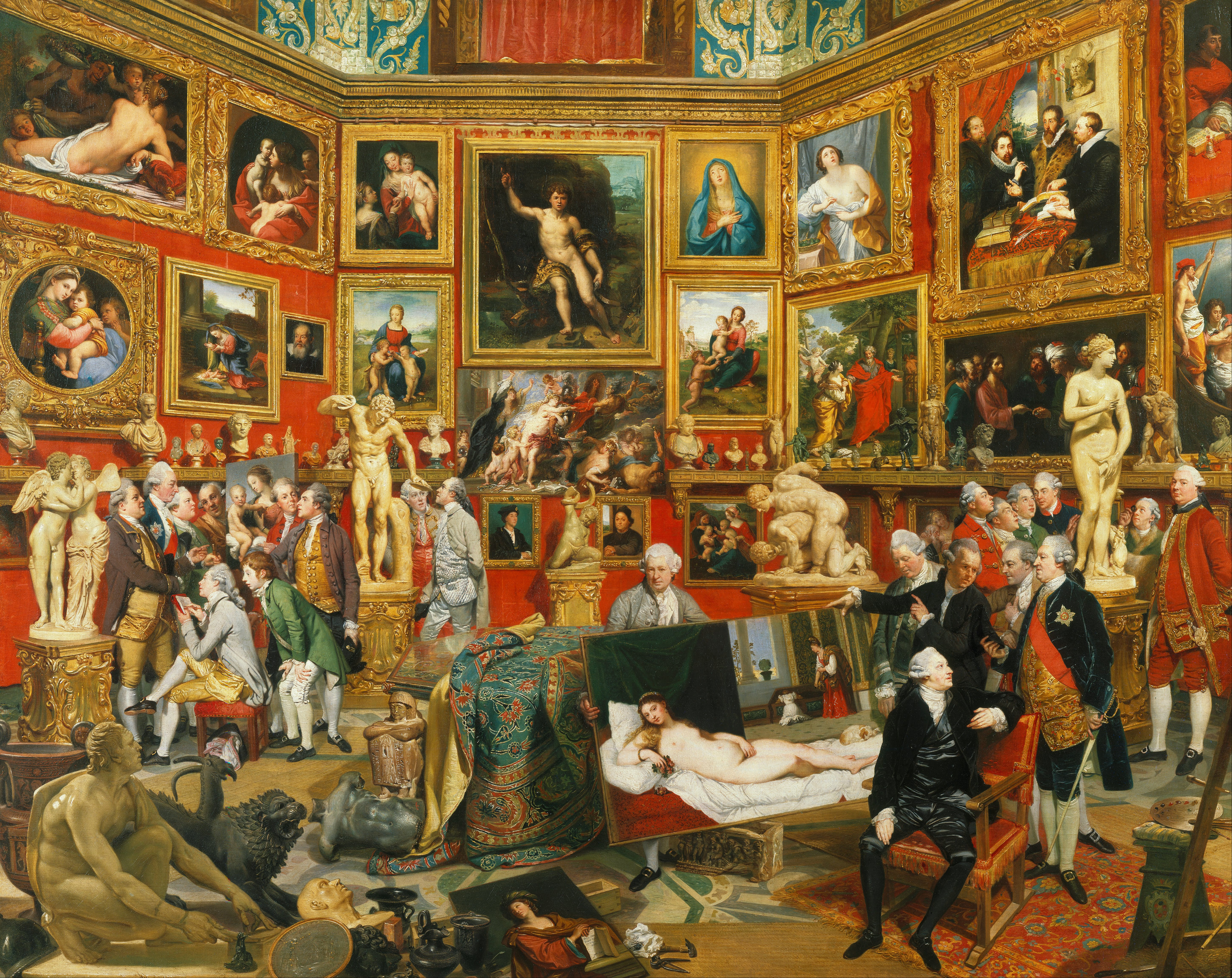
- Artist: Johan Zoffany
- Year: 1772–1778
- Catalogue: RCIN 406983
- Medium: Oil on canvas
- Dimensions: 123.5 cm × 155.0 cm (48.6 in × 61.0 in)
- Location: Royal Collection, Windsor Castle

The Tribuna of the Uffizi is an oil painting by German-British painter Johan Zoffany, created in 1772-1778. It depicts the north-east section of the Tribuna room in the Uffizi, in Florence, Italy. The painting is part of the Royal Collection.

== Production ==
Beginning in 1764, the German-born painter Johan Zoffany received numerous commissions from the Hanoverian King George III and his consort, Queen Charlotte. The queen ordered Zoffany to paint "the Florence Gallery" (the Galleria degli Uffizi), for which the artist would be paid £300. In the summer of 1772, Zoffany left London for Florence, where he met Felton Hervey, an art collector and friend of the king and queen, who figures prominently in the painting. Zoffany worked on the painting through late 1777 and returned to England in 1779. By this time Hervey had died. It was submitted to the Royal Academy Exhibition of 1780 at Somerset House.

The painting depicts the Tribuna of the Uffizi, an octagonal gallery designed by Bernardo Buontalenti in 1584. The most important ancient and Renaissance works were displayed in this gallery in the 18th century, making it an essential highlight of the Grand Tour.

== Artworks shown ==
Zoffany's picture is not a historical record of the works displayed in the tribuna in the 1770s. Rather, it is an epitome of the works in the Medici collections he felt to be most important. To accomplish that goal, several works from other rooms in the Uffizi and seven paintings from the Galleria Palatina in the Palazzo Pitti were transferred to the Tribuna. To accomplish this, Zoffany requested the assistance of George, 3rd Earl Cowper, who had emigrated to Florence and Sir Horace Mann, who served as British diplomatic representative in Florence to the Grand Dukes of Tuscany. Two pictures by Raphael which Earl Cowper owned and hoped to sell to George III, and the Earl are depicted in Zoffany's painting. The unframed Samian Sibyl on the floor, acquired for the Medici collection in 1777, was a pendant to Guercino's Libyan Sibyl, recently bought by George III, and its inclusion may have been intended as a compliment to him.

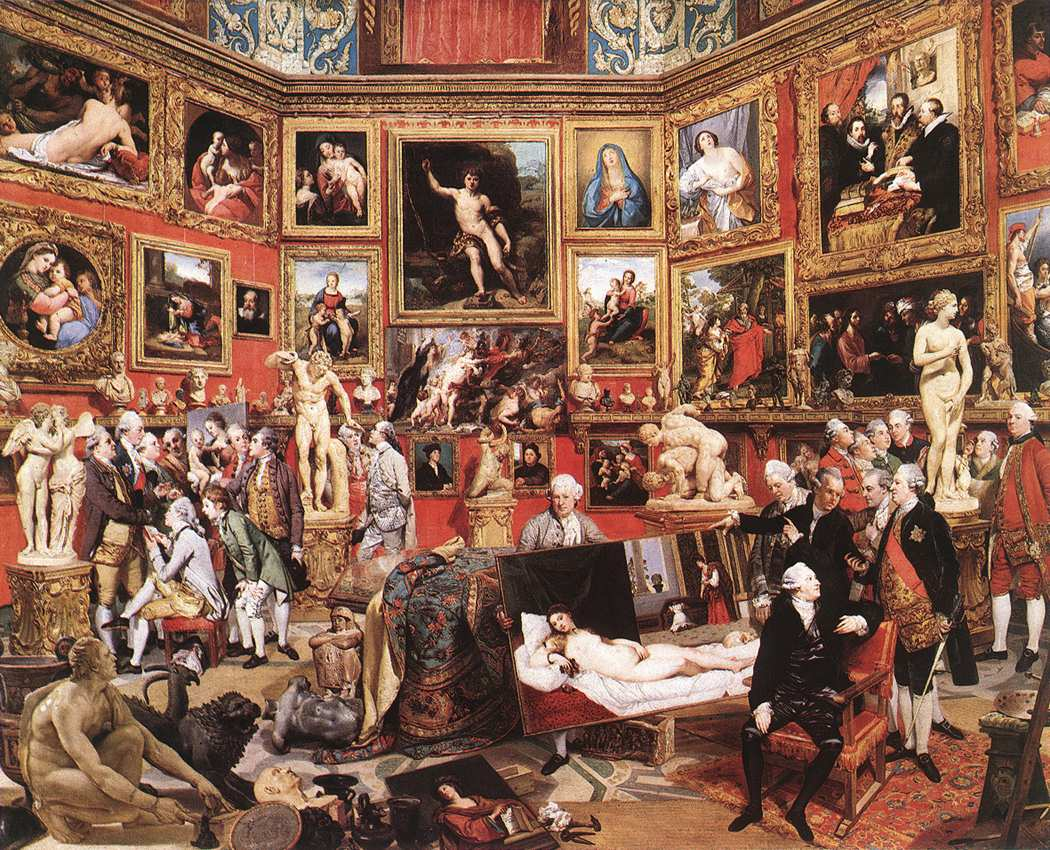
The Tribuna of the Uffizi by Johann Zoffany. Place cursor over artworks or persons to identify them.

=== Paintings ===
Zoffany's	Original	Author and title	Where	Current location
		Annibale Carracci, Venus with a Satyr and Two Cupids	Left wall	Uffizi, Florence
		Guido Reni, Charity	Left wall	Palatine Gallery, Palazzo Pitti, Florence
		Raphael, Madonna della seggiola	Left wall	Palatine Gallery, Palazzo Pitti, Florence
		Correggio, Adoration of the Christ Child	Left wall	Uffizi, Florence
		Justus Sustermans, Portrait of Galileo Galilei	Left wall	Uffizi, Florence
		After Rembrandt?, possibly a copy of the Holy Family with Saint Anne in the Louvre	Left wall	Unidentified
		Titian's workshop, Madonna and Child with Saint Catherine of Alexandria	Central wall	Uffizi, Florence
		Raphael and workshop, St John the Baptist	Central wall	Uffizi, Florence
		Guido Reni, Madonna	Central wall	private collection?
		Raphael, Madonna del cardellino	Central wall	Uffizi, Florence
		Peter Paul Rubens, Consequences of War	Central wall	Palatine Gallery, Palazzo Pitti, Florence
		Franciabigio (formerly attributed to Raphael), Madonna del Pozzo	Central wall	Uffizi, Florence
		?	Central wall between the legs of the Satyr	Unidentified
		Hans Holbein, Portrait of Sir Richard Southwell	Central wall	Uffizi, Florence
		Raphael, Portrait of Perugino	Central wall	Uffizi, Florence
		Perugino's workshop (Niccolò Soggi?), Madonna with Child, Saint Elizabeth and Saint John	Central wall	Uffizi, Florence, still in the Tribuna
		Guido Reni, Cleopatra	Right wall	Palatine Gallery, Palazzo Pitti, Florence
		Rubens, The Four Philosophers	Right wall	Palatine Gallery, Palazzo Pitti, Florence
		Raphael, Pope Leo X with Cardinals Giulio de' Medici and Luigi de' Rossi	Right wall	Uffizi, Florence
		Pietro da Cortona, Abraham and Hagar	Right wall	Kunsthistorisches Museum, Vienna
		Bartolomeo Manfredi, Tribute to Caesar	Right wall	Uffizi, Florence
		Cristofano Allori, Hospitality of Saint Julian	Right wall	Palatine Gallery, Palazzo Pitti, Florence
		?	Right wall right of the Wrestlers	Unidentified
		Roman Charity?	Right wall	Unidentified
		?	Right wall behind the Venus	Unidentified
		? (a golden frame behind the man in red at the very right)	Right wall	
		Raphael, Niccolini-Cowper Madonna (Note: This painting was owned by Zoffany at the moment: this explains its prominence.)	Lower part	National Gallery of Art, Washington
		Guercino's workshop, Samian Sibyl	Lower part	Deposits of the Palazzo Pitti, Florence
		Titian, Venus of Urbino	Lower part	Uffizi, Florence

=== Sculptures and other ===
Many of the ancient sculptures painted by Zoffany can be identified, although few remain on their 18th century locations today. The Medici's Roman statues stand in the main corridors of the Uffizi Gallery, except those which are still in the Tribuna room in the Uffizi. The smaller works are now in the collections of the National Archaeological Museum and the Bargello in Florence.

Zoffany's	Original	Author and title	Where	Current location
		Bust of a young woman, previously known as Plautilla	Left shelf	Uffizi Gallery, Florence
		Bust of a young man, previously known as Geta	Left shelf	Uffizi Gallery, Florence
		Bust of a woman	Left shelf	Museo degli Argenti, Florence
		Ancient Roman bust of a Julio-Claudian woman, previously known as Livia (?)	Left shelf	Villa Corsini a Castello, Florence
		Ancient Roman bust of Augustus	Left shelf	Museo degli Argenti, Florence
		Bust of Agrippina Minor	Left shelf	Uffizi Gallery
		Bust of Augustus	Left shelf	Museo degli Argenti, Florence
		Ancient Roman art, Venus of Aphrodisias	Left shelf	Villa Corsini a Castello, Florence
		Bust of a man in antique style	Left shelf	Museo degli Argenti, Florence
		Seated man (?)	Central shelf	
		Ancient Roman Seated God	Central shelf	National Archaeological Museum, Florence
		Bust of so-called Annius Verus	Central shelf	Uffizi Gallery (Vasari Corridor)
		Hardstone footed cup	Central shelf	
		Bust of a boy, previously known as the young Nero	Central shelf	Uffizi Gallery, Florence
		Ancient Roman small bust of an Augustus (?)	Central shelf	National Archaeological Museum, Florence
		Bust of Zeus-Serapis	Central shelf	Villa Corsini a Castello, Florence
		Bronze statuette	Central shelf	
		Bust of a man (?)	Central shelf	
		Cupid with the bow	Central shelf	Uffizi Gallery, Florence
		Ancient Roman bronze statuette of Heracles	Right shelf	National Archaeological Museum, Florence
		Bust of a man (?)	Right shelf	
		Canopic jar (?)	Right shelf	
		Bust of Nerva	Right shelf	Museo degli Argenti, Florence
		Bertoldo di Giovanni, Putto playing the lute	Right shelf	Bargello, Florence
		Ancient Roman statuette of Satyr	Right shelf	Villa Corsini a Castello, Florence
		Seated Concordia	Right shelf	National Archaeological Museum, Florence
		Ancient Roman bust of a Young Satyr	Right shelf	Villa Corsini a Castello, Florence
		Ancient Roman art after Lysippus, Heracles and the Nemean Lion	Right shelf	Hermitage, St. Petersburg?
		Seated Tyche of Anthioch	Right shelf	National Archaeological Museum, Florence
		Bust of Bacchus (?)	Right shelf	
		Ancient Roman art, Cupid and Psyche	Centre	Uffizi, Florence
		Ancient Roman art, Dancing Faun	Centre	Uffizi, Florence, still in the Tribuna
		Jacopo Antelli (Monicca) and Jacopo Ligozzi, Octagonal table with Pietre Dure mosaics	Centre	Uffizi, Florence, still in the Tribuna
		Ancient Roman art, Baby Hercules strangling the snake	Centre	Uffizi, Florence, still in the Tribuna
		Ancient Roman art, The Two Wrestlers	Centre	Uffizi, Florence, still in the Tribuna
		Cleomenes, Medici Venus	Centre	Uffizi, Florence, still in the Tribuna
		Baltimore Painter, Apulian krater with Amazonomachy	Lower part	National Archaeological Museum, Florence
		Etruscan bronze helmet with "button" on top	Lower part	National Archaeological Museum, Florence
		Ancient Roman art, Arrotino	Lower part	Uffizi, Florence, still in the Tribuna
		Etruscan (with 17th-century implements), Chimera of Arezzo	Lower part	National Archaeological Museum, Florence
		Andrea Briosco workshop, Lamp in the shape of a Twisting Man	Lower part	Bargello, Florence
		Plate (missorium) of F. Ardaburius Aspar', Roman, c.. 434 AD	Lower part	National Archaeological Museum, Florence
		Bust, previously known as Cicero	Lower part	Uffizi Gallery
		Florentine pseudo-antique art, second half of the 16th century, Bronze head of Antinous	Lower part	National Archaeological Museum, Florence
		Bronze lamp (?)	Lower part	
		Bucchero Etruscan krater	Lower part	National Archaeological Museum, Florence
		Bucchero Etruscan oinochoe	Lower part	National Archaeological Museum, Florence
		Bucchero Etruscan situla	Lower part	National Archaeological Museum, Florence
		Ancient Greek art, Livorno Torso	Lower part	National Archaeological Museum, Florence
		Ancient Egyptian art, Cube statue of Ptahmose	Lower part	National Archaeological Museum, Florence
		Etruscan funerary urn probably made in Volterra	Lower part, under the Venus of Urbino	National Archaeological Museum, Florence

== Persons shown ==
The Tribuna of the Uffizi combines aspects of the British 18th-century conversation piece, or informal group portrait, with that of the predominantly Flemish 17th-century tradition of Wunderkammer and gallery views. Thus, the figures populating Zoffany's painting are all identifiable as connoisseurs, diplomats and visitors to Florence. The inclusion of so many recognisable portraits was criticised by Zoffany's royal patrons, and by Horace Walpole, who called it "a flock of travelling boys, and one does not know nor care whom."

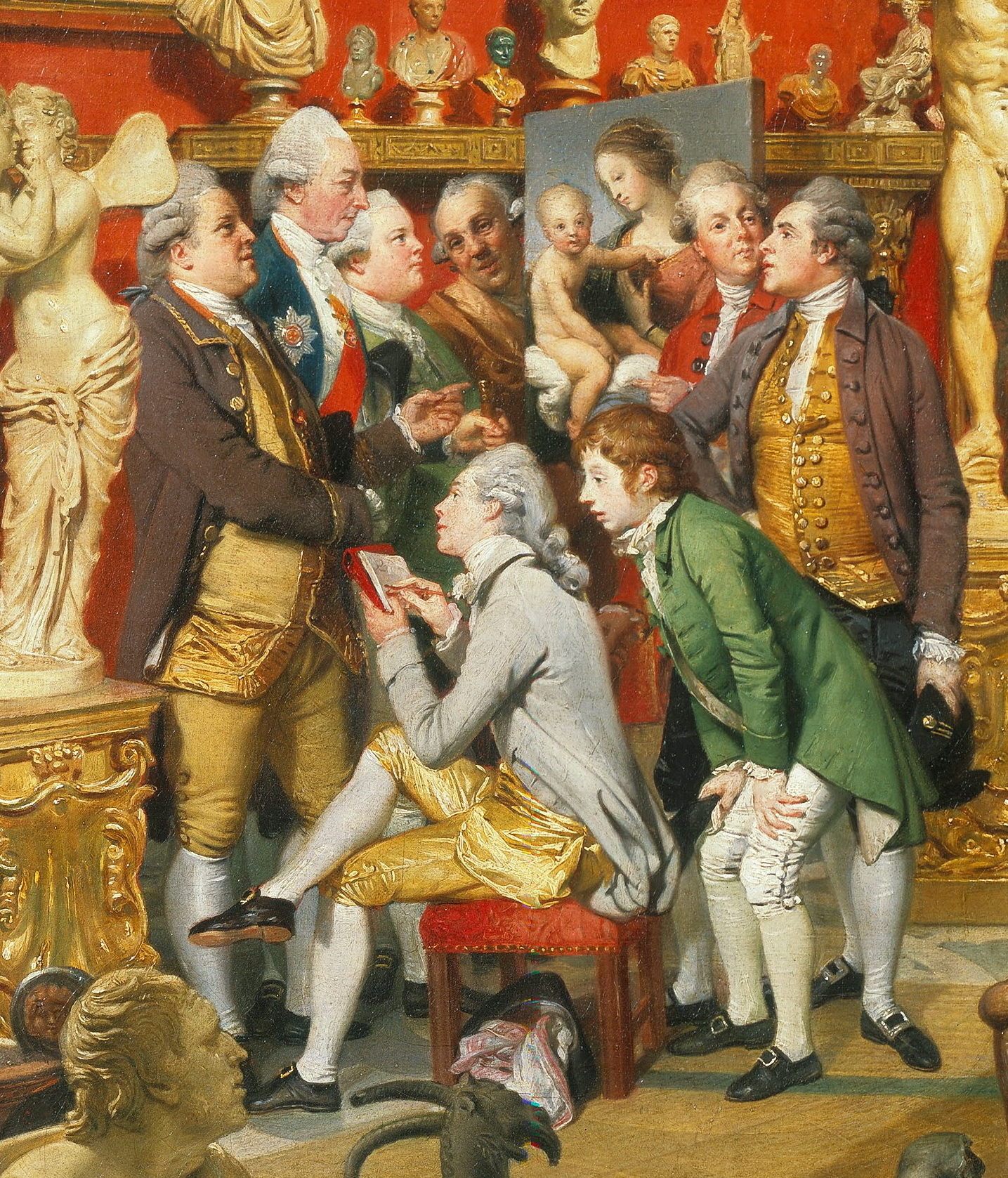

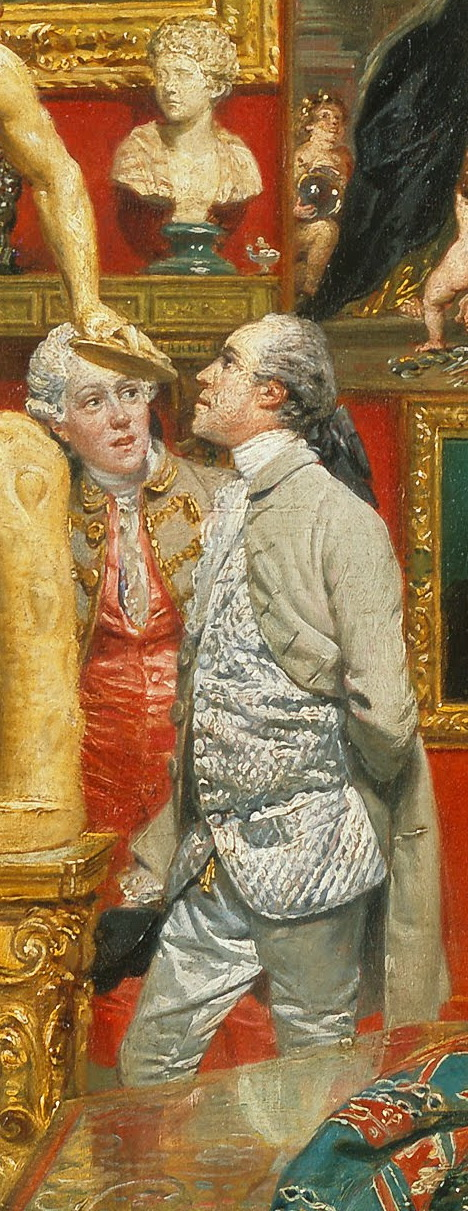

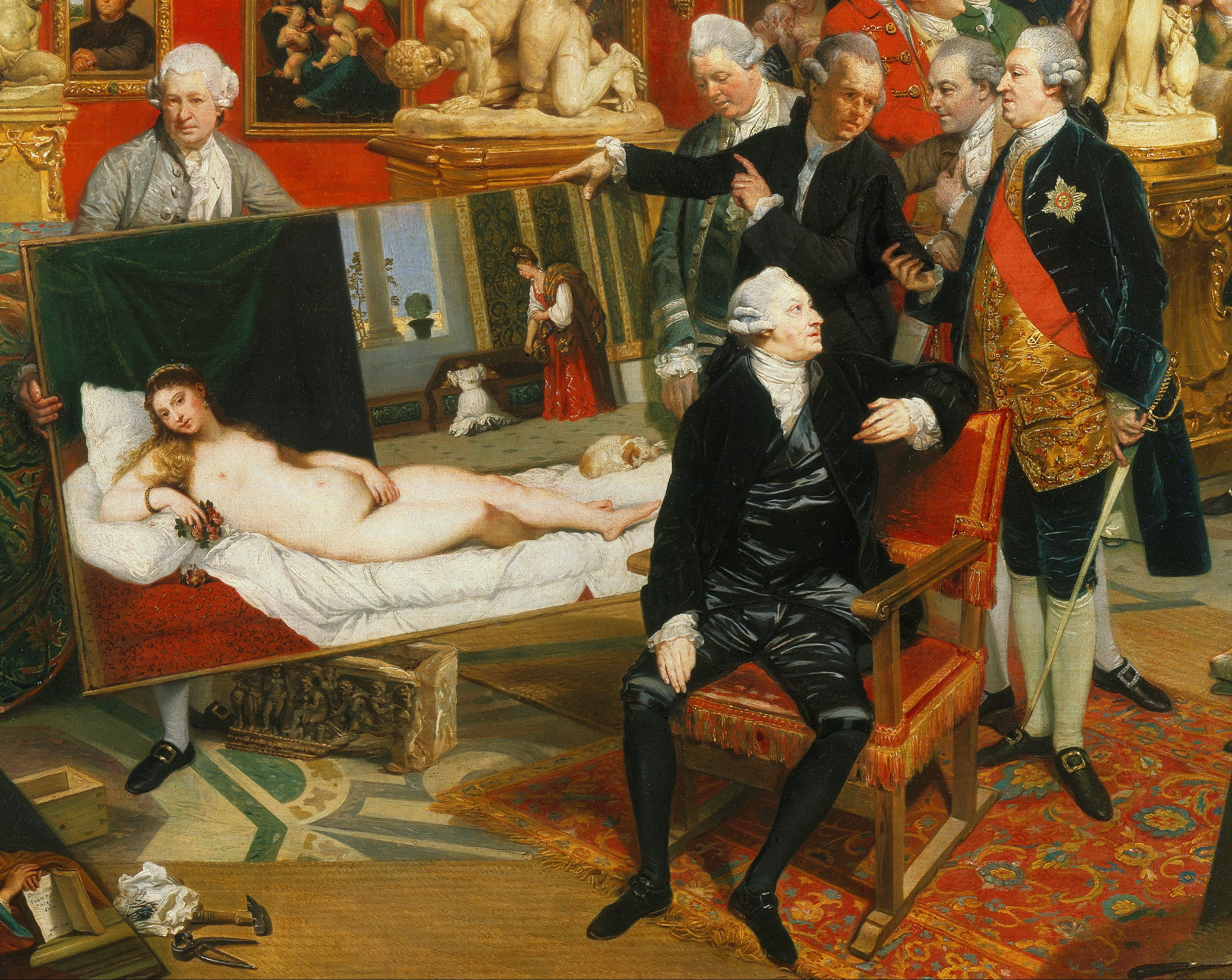

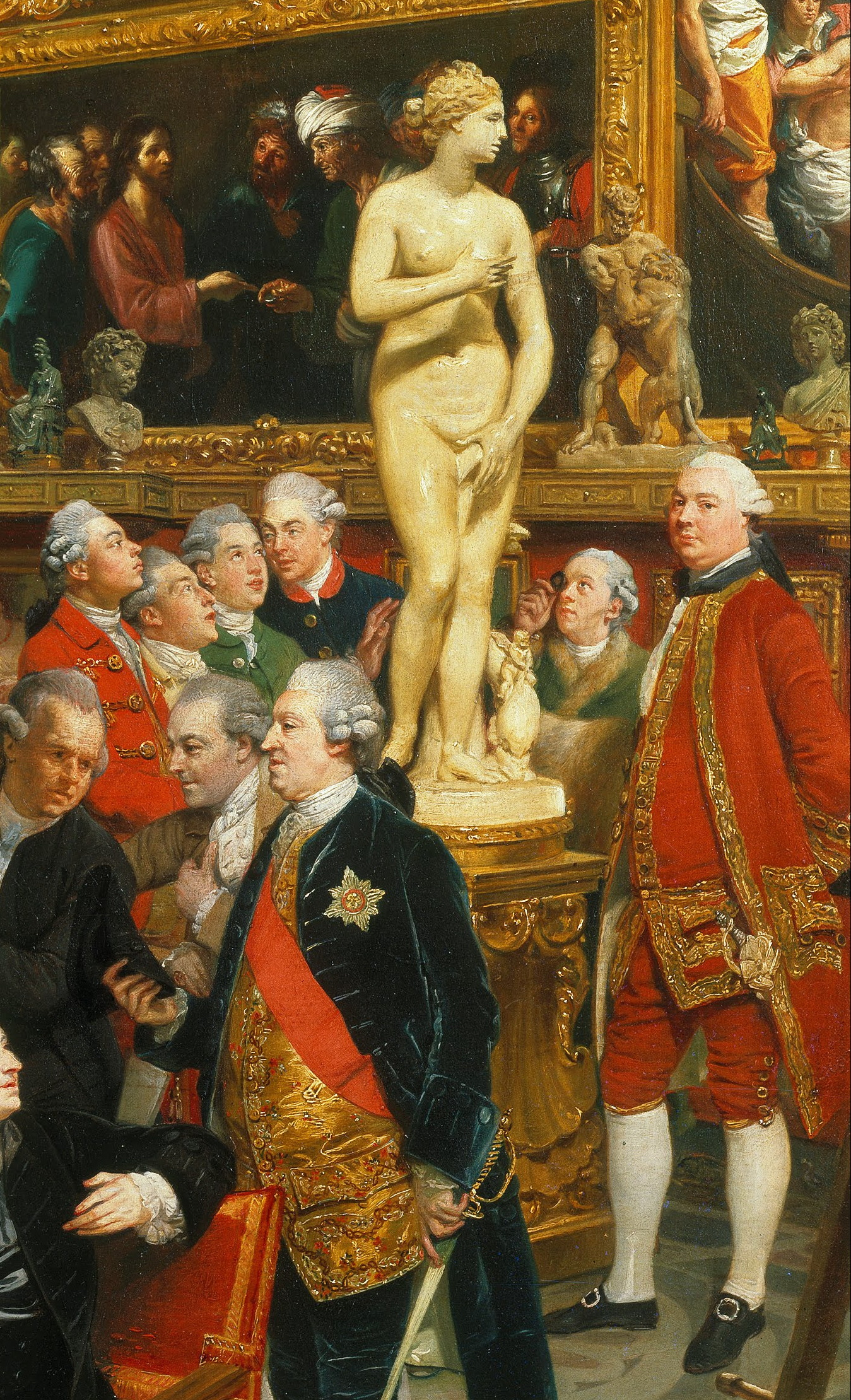

The first group of people is centred around the Niccolini Madonna by Raphael. From left, standing up, there are the picture's owner George Clavering-Cowper, 3rd Earl Cowper, Sir John Dick, 2nd Baronet, Other Windsor, 5th Earl of Plymouth and the painter himself Johan Zoffany, followed on the other side of the painting by Mr. Stevenson and his companion George Legge, 3rd Earl of Dartmouth, while sitting on a chair is Charles Loraine Smith and behind him, bended, Richard Edgcumbe.

Two more connoisseurs are near the Satiro. The first is reported to be Joseph Leeson, 2nd Earl of Milltown, even if his portrait does not match in age and resemblance those in the National Gallery of Ireland by Pompeo Batoni, and Valentine Knightley.

Further to the centre of the painting Pietro Bastianelli, curator of the Uffizi Gallery, shows the Venus of Urbino by Titian to John Gordon, (Note: Described in contemporary Italian newspapers as "Mr. Gordon, an English official".John Chambers wrote in 1829 that Rev. William Gordon of Saxlingham possessed several paintings "collected by John Gordon, who figured in Zoffany's picture of the Gallery of Florence".) Thomas Patch who is apparently the man touching the Venus, but pointing to the figure of a male nude (believed to be a reference to Patch's homosexuality), Sir John Taylor and Sir Horace Mann. The sitting man, looking back towards, is the Hon. Felton Hervey.

The group around the Medici Venus include John Finch, Mr. Wilbraham (one of the sons of Roger Wilbraham of Nantwich), Mr. Watts, Mr. Doughty and, on the other side, Thomas Wilbraham (the second son) and James Bruce.

Detail	Portrait	Name	Note
		George Clavering-Cowper, 3rd Earl Cowper	
		Sir John Dick, 2nd Baronet	
		Other Windsor, 5th Earl of Plymouth	
		Johann Zoffany	the author of painting (self-portrait)
		David Stevenson	tutor to Lord Lewisham
		George Legge, 3rd Earl of Dartmouth	
		Charles Loraine Smith	painter
		Richard Edgcumbe	
		Joseph Leeson, 2nd Earl of Milltown	is reported to be, even if his portrait does not match in age and resemblance those in the National Gallery of Ireland by Pompeo Batoni
		Valentine Knightley	also painter
		Pietro Bastianelli	curator of the Uffizi Gallery
		John Gordon	
		Thomas Patch	probably the man touching the Venus
		Sir John Taylor, 1st Baronet	
		Sir Horace Mann, 1st Baronet	
		Hon. Felton Hervey	
		John Finch, 9th Earl of Winchilsea	
		Roger Wilbraham	
		Mr. Watts	
		Mr. Doughty	
		Thomas Wilbraham	(brother of Roger Wilbraham, second son of Roger Wilbraham of Nantwich)
		James Bruce	

== See also ==
- A Modern Picture Gallery, an 1824 painting by William Frederick Witherington
