= Villa Corsini a Castello =

Coordinates: 43°48′58.02″N 11°13′56.87″E

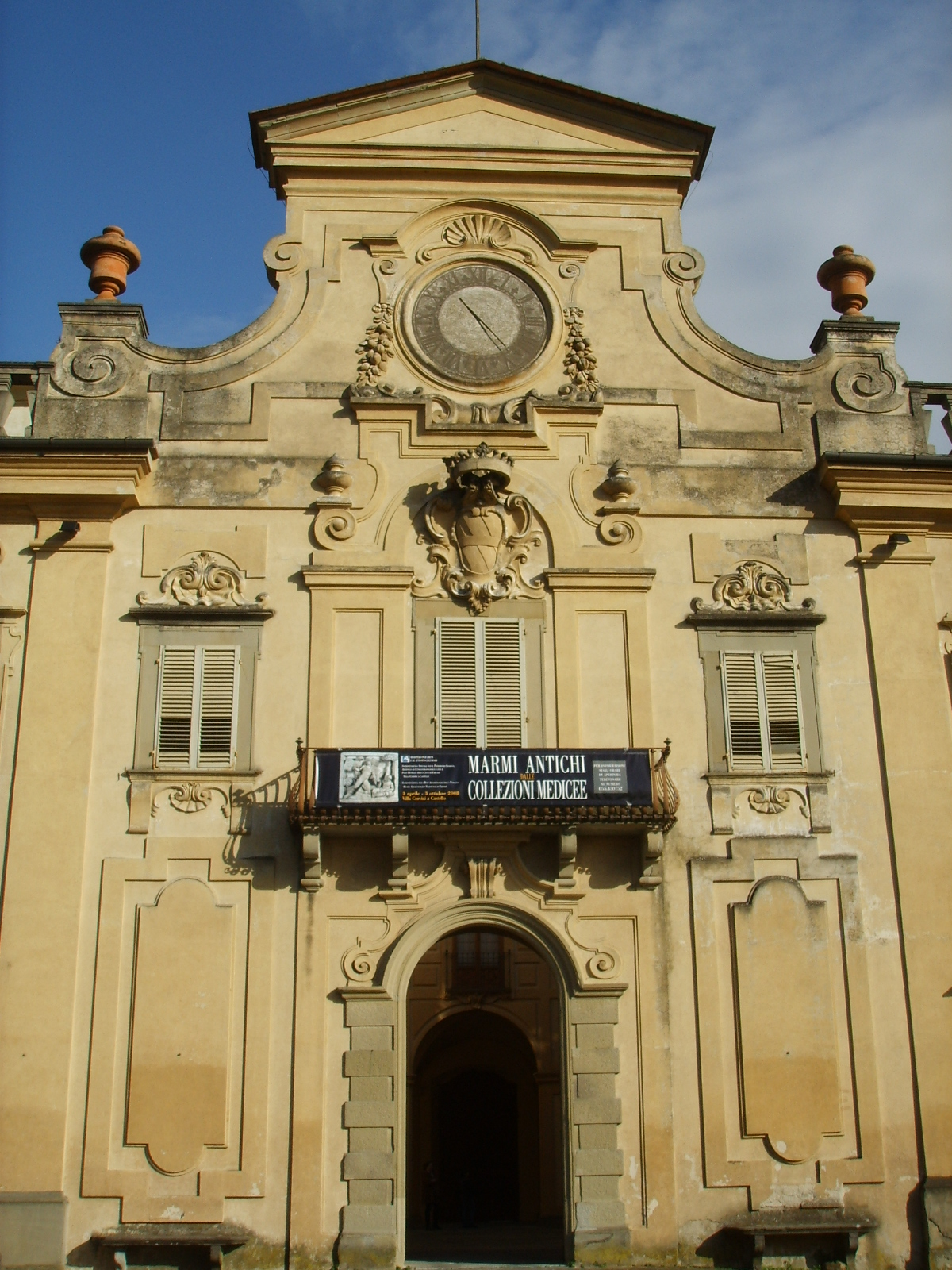
Main face

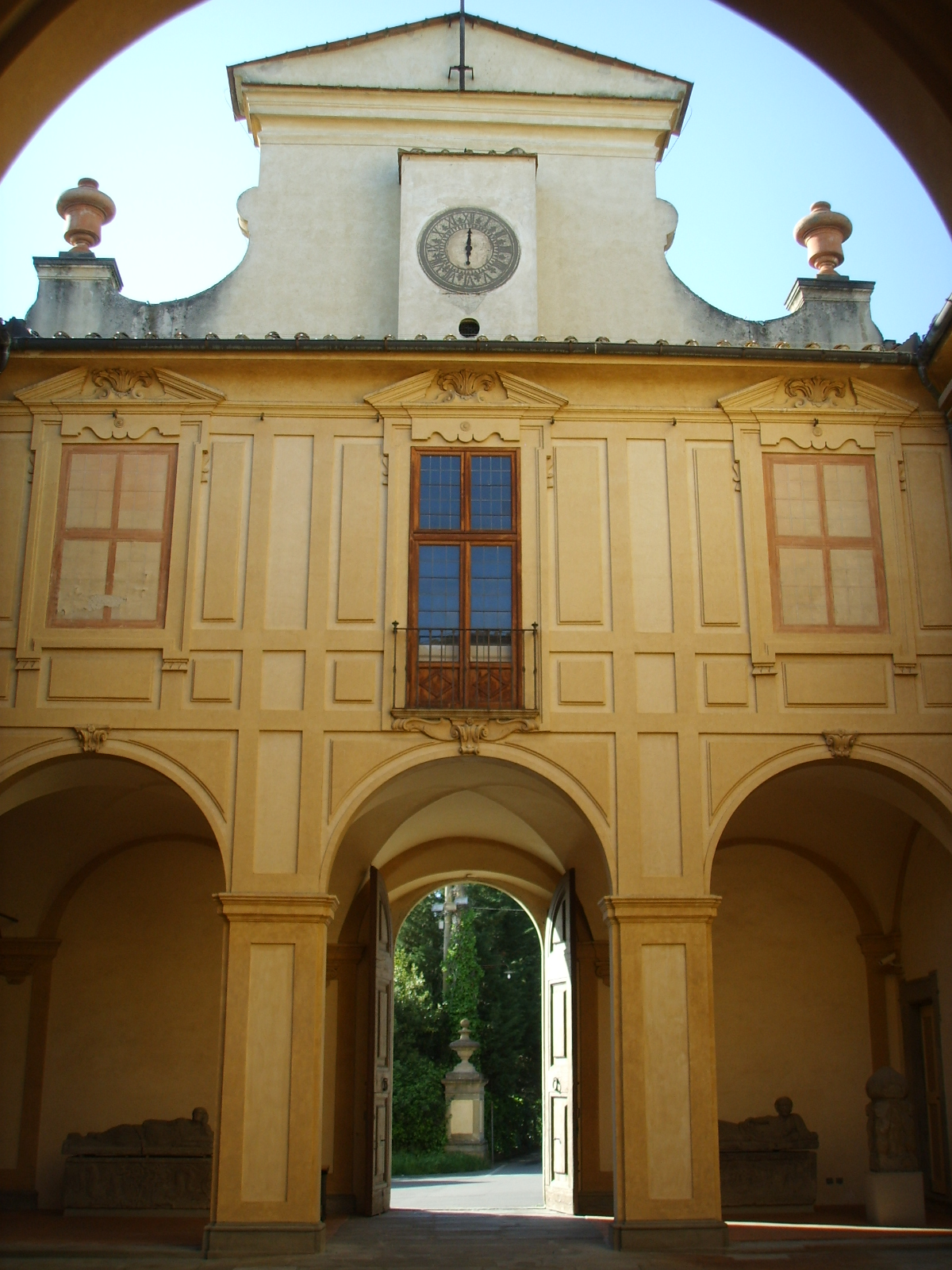
Back face from the courtyard

Villa Corsini a Castello is a suburban villa near Florence, Italy, located in via della Petraia.

== History ==
The origin of the building dates back to 15th century, when it was a rural mansion for the Strozzi family. Later on it was owned by the Rinieri family, and during the 16th century Niccolò Tribolo designed here his first garden, before Boboli.

In 1697, in part due its proximity to the Medici Villa La Petraia, the Corsini family bought the villa, and the property underwent to a complete renovation in a sober baroque style, designed by Giovan Battista Foggini. In 1950s it was acquired by the Italian State, and now it holds a separate section of the National Archaeological Museum of Florence.

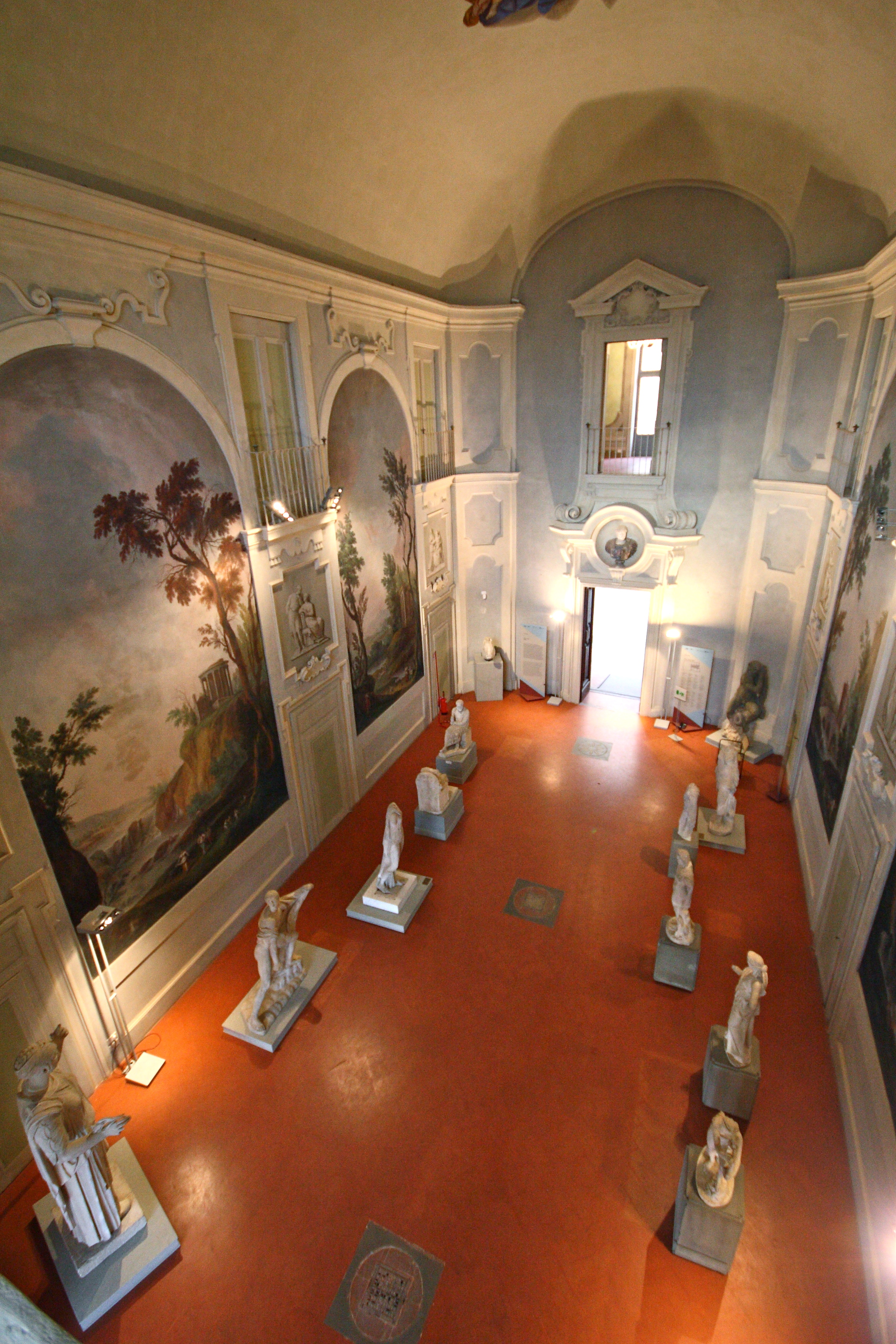
Interior

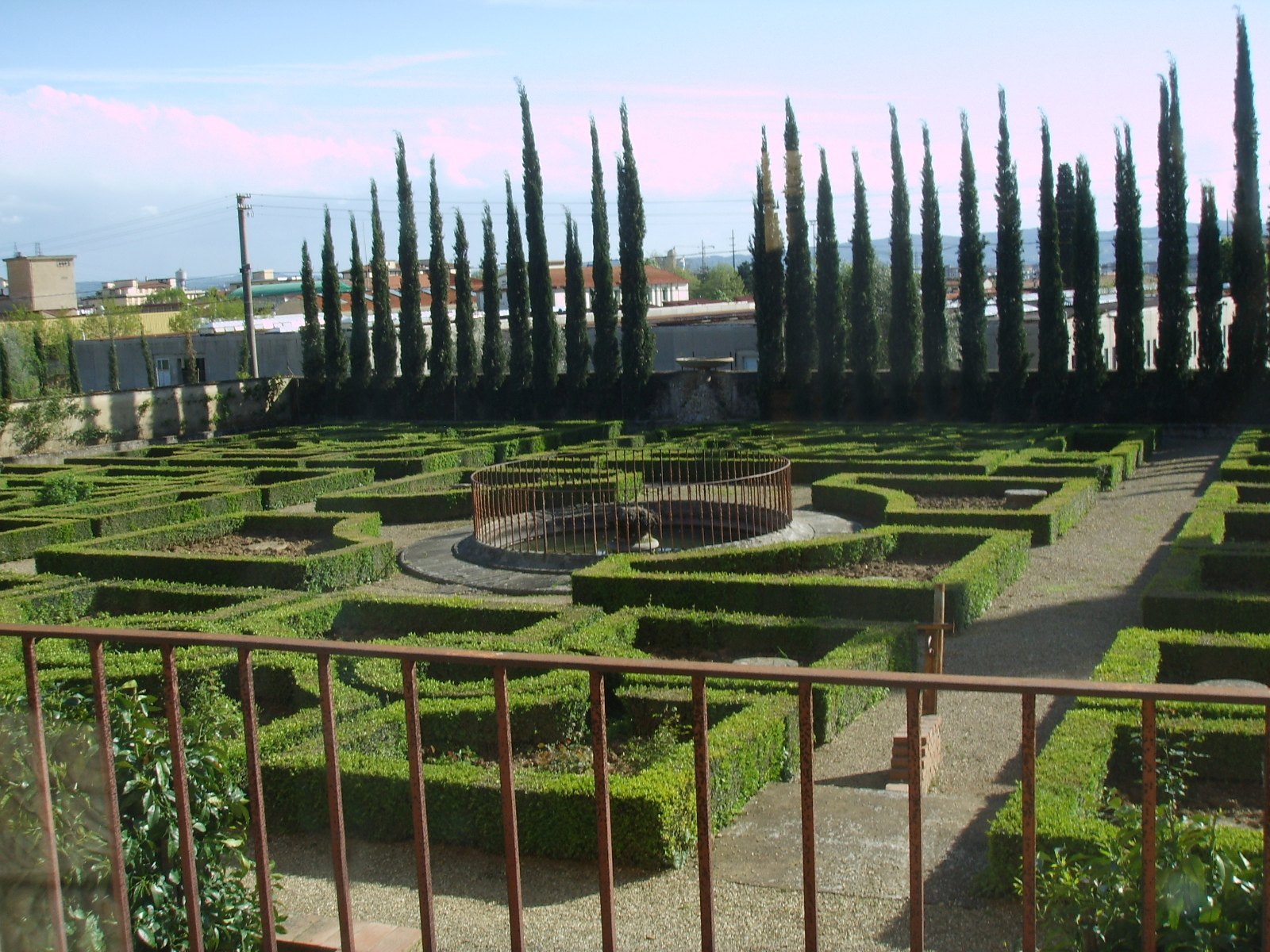
Gardens

== See also ==
- Villa Corsini, Rome
