= Tribuna of the Uffizi =

Octagonal room in the Uffizi Gallery, Florence, Italy

Coordinates: 43.7681°N 11.2557°E

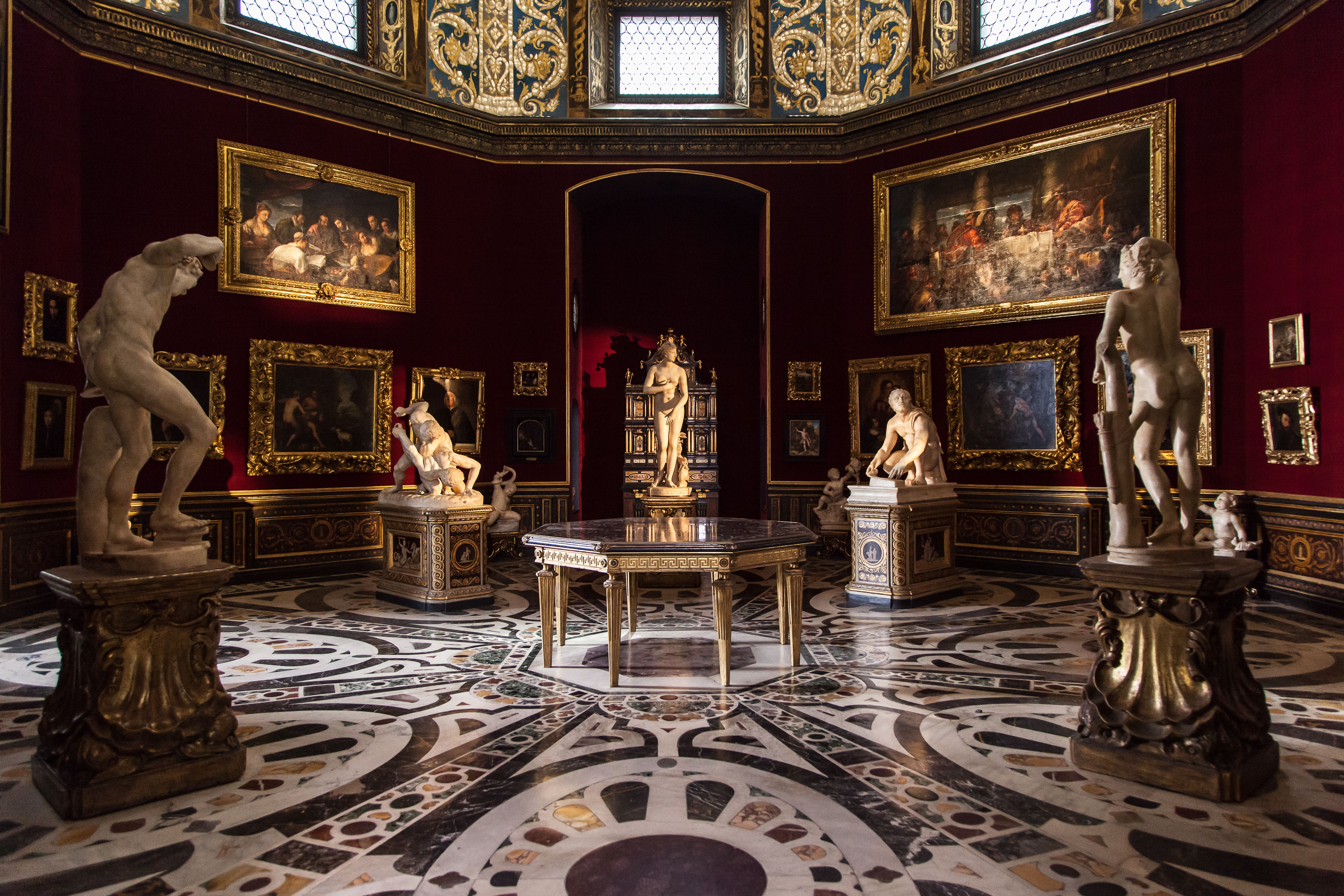
Tribuna degli Uffizi

The Tribuna of the Uffizi is an octagonal exhibition hall in the Uffizi Gallery in Florence, Italy. Designed by Bernardo Buontalenti for Francesco I de' Medici in 1584, the most important antiquities and High Renaissance and Bolognese paintings from the Medici collection were and still are displayed here. This collection was ceded in 1743 by Anna Maria Luisa de' Medici to the Tuscan government. By the 1770s, the Uffizi, and in particular the Tribuna, was the hub for Grand Tourists visiting Florence.

The octagonal plan of the room reflects the Renaissance association of architectural forms with the Christian numerological tradition, where eight is the number which draws near Heaven.

== Painting ==
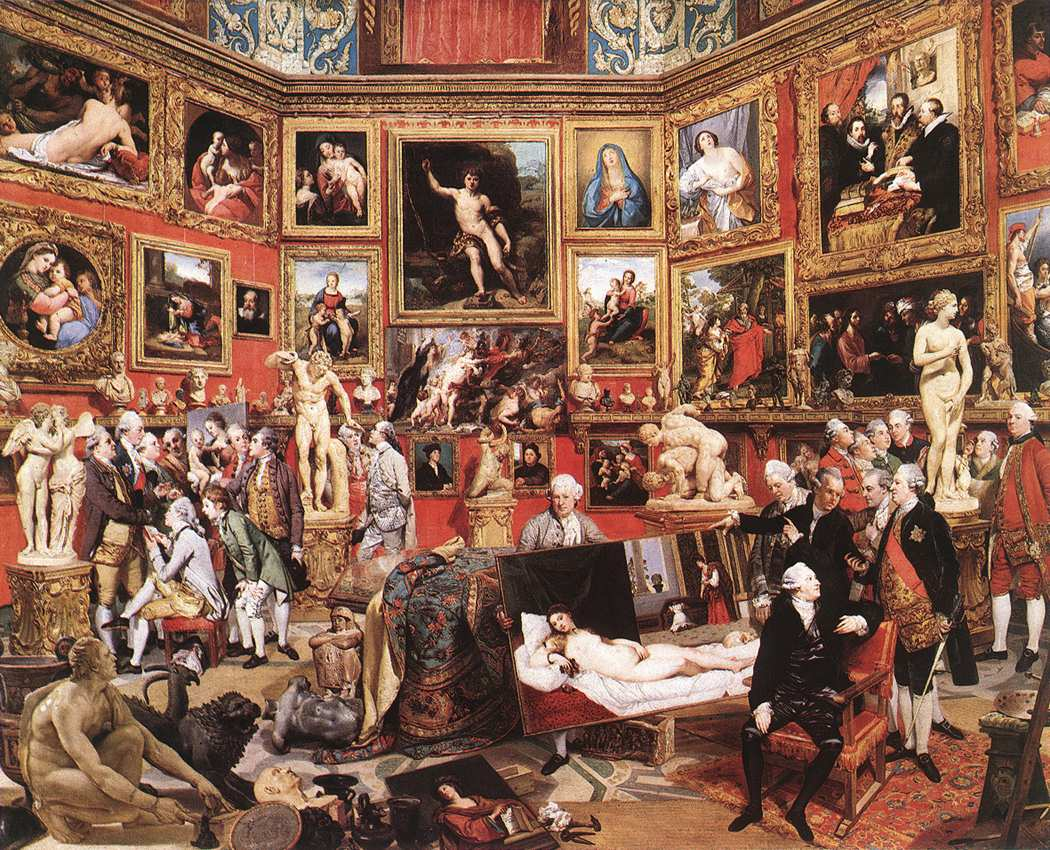
The Tribuna of the Uffizi by Johann Zoffany. Place cursor over artworks or persons to identify them.

Johan Zoffany's painting of the Tribuna, commissioned by Charlotte of Mecklenburg-Strelitz in 1772, portrays the northeast section but varies the arrangement and brings in works not normally displayed in the room, such as Raphael’s Madonna della Sedia. Admiring the works of art are connoisseurs, diplomats and visitors to Florence, all identifiable. The Tribuna degli Uffizi was restored between 2009 and 2012.
