= Niccolini-Cowper Madonna =

Painting by Raphael

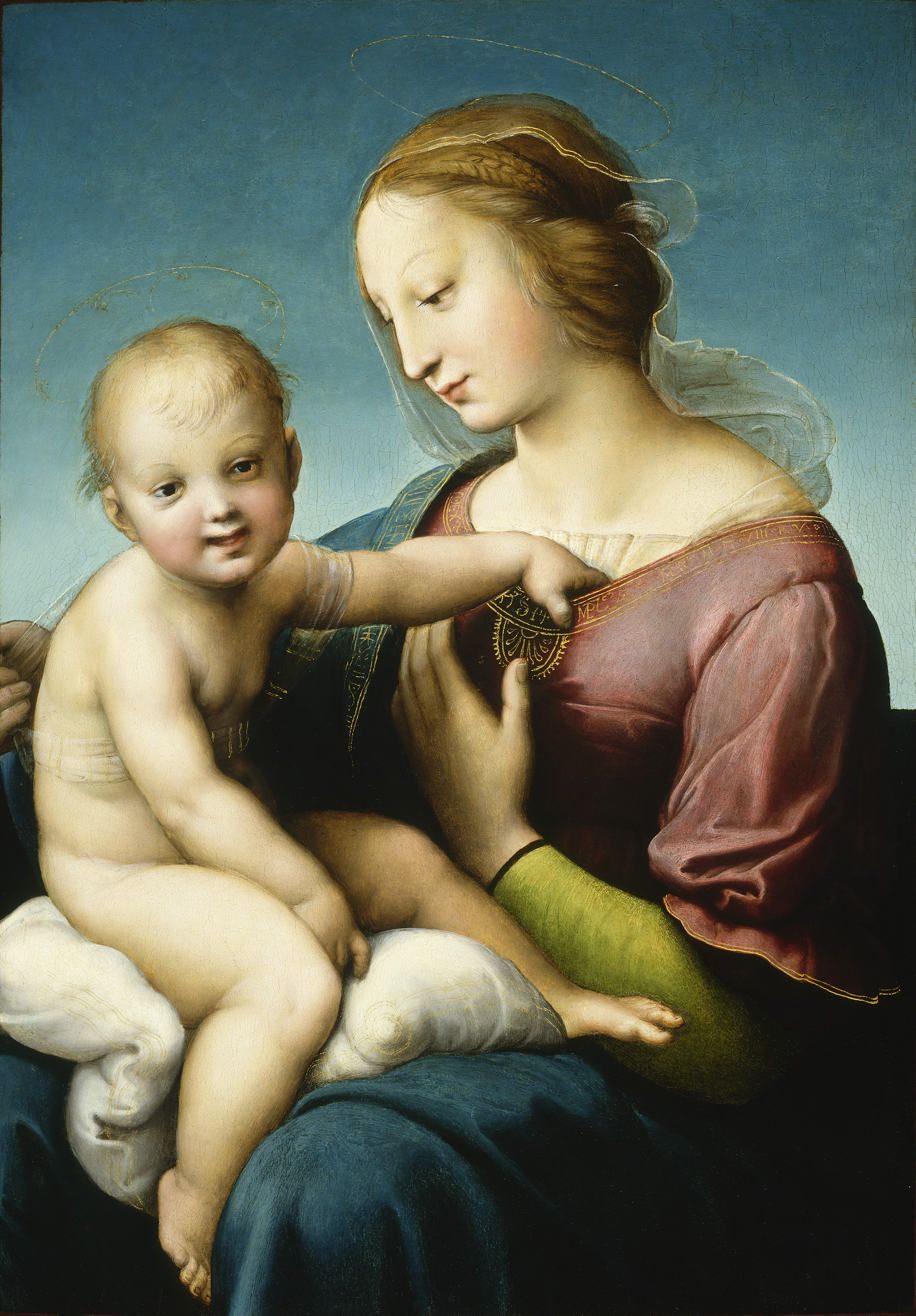
- Artist: Raphael
- Year: 1508
- Medium: Oil on panel
- Dimensions: 80.7 cm × 57.5 cm (31.8 in × 22.6 in)
- Location: National Gallery of Art, Washington, D.C.

The Niccolini-Cowper Madonna, also known as the Large Cowper Madonna, is a painting by the Italian High Renaissance artist Raphael, depicting Mary and Jesus Christ as the Christ Child, against a blue sky.

== The painting ==
The painting may have been the last of Raphael's Florentine paintings before he left for Rome. It is more complex than a similar painting the Small Cowper Madonna of a few years earlier. The Virgin and Child fill the canvas, creating an imposing effect. The two are more closely related, both by the positioning of their bodies and their intimacy. Raphael may have derived the talent for creating a natural intimacy through Leonardo da Vinci. The portrayal of the infant's energy is reminiscent of the works of Michelangelo. The compelling, playful Child reaches for the Madonna's top as if wanting to nurse. Both paintings bear the name of their former owners.

An inscription on the painting, center right on the border of Madonna's bodice: MDVIII.R.V.PIN tells that it was painted in 1508 by Raphael of Urbino.

== Provenance ==
- In the Niccolini family, Casa Niccolini, Florence, from 1677 or earlier to sometime after 1772,
- The artist Johann Zoffany (1733–1810) purchased the painting after 1772
- the painting came into the line of the Earls Cowper about 1775
  - sold first to George Clavering-Cowper, 3rd Earl Cowper (d. 1789), Panshanger, Hertford, England, and then subsequent inheritances,
  - George Clavering-Cowper, 4th Earl Cowper (d. 1799), Panshanger
  - Peter Clavering-Cowper, 5th Earl Cowper (d. 1837), Panshanger
  - George Cowper, 6th Earl Cowper (d. 1856), Panshanger
  - Francis Cowper, 7th Earl Cowper and 7th Baron Lucas (d. 1905), Panshanger and Wrest Park, Bedfordshire, England
  - Francis' widow, Katrine Cecilia Compton Cowper, Countess Cowper (d. 1913), Panshanger;
  - Ettie Grenfell, Baroness Desborough, granddaughter of the 6th Earl, Panshanger
- sold for $875,000 in 1928 to Duveen Brothers, London, New York, and Paris, who purchased The Small Cowper Madonna from Lady Desborough in 1913.
- sold for $1,166,000 in November 1928 to Andrew W. Mellon, Pittsburgh and Washington, D.C. (1855–1937)
- deeded 30 December 1930 to The A.W. Mellon Educational and Charitable Trust, Pittsburgh
- gifted in 1937 to the National Gallery of Art in Washington, DC

== Story ==
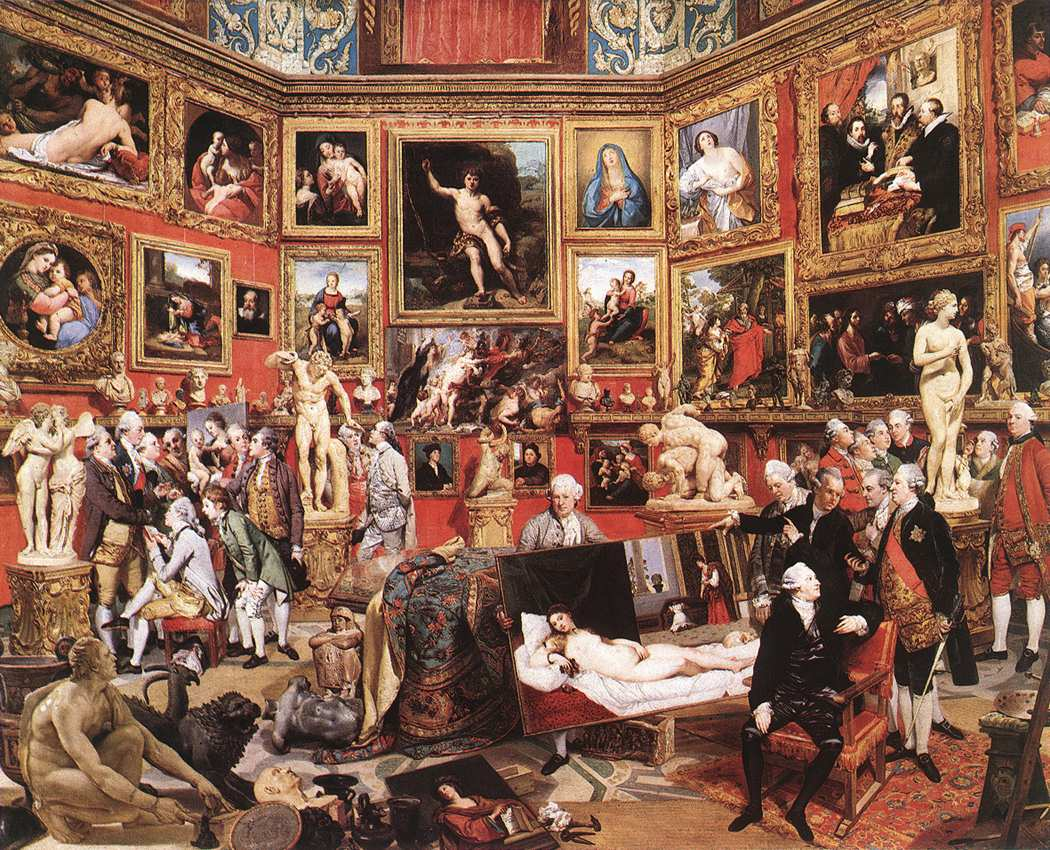
Cursor can be used to find the painting as Johann Zoffany attempts to sell it to George Clavering-Cowper, 3rd Earl Cowper.

Cowper's art collection absorbed a great deal of his time and money. His most notable possessions are probably the two Cowper Madonna paintings Raphael: Small Cowper Madonna and this painting, the Niccolini-Cowper Madonna. Tribuna of the Uffizi shows Cowper looking at the Niccolini-Cowper Madonna painting as it is offered by Johann Zoffany. Zoffany had purchased the painting from the Niccolini family in 1782 and sold it to Cowper in 1785.

== See also ==
- List of paintings by Raphael
