= Madonna della Seggiola =

Painting by Raphael

Madonna della seggiola
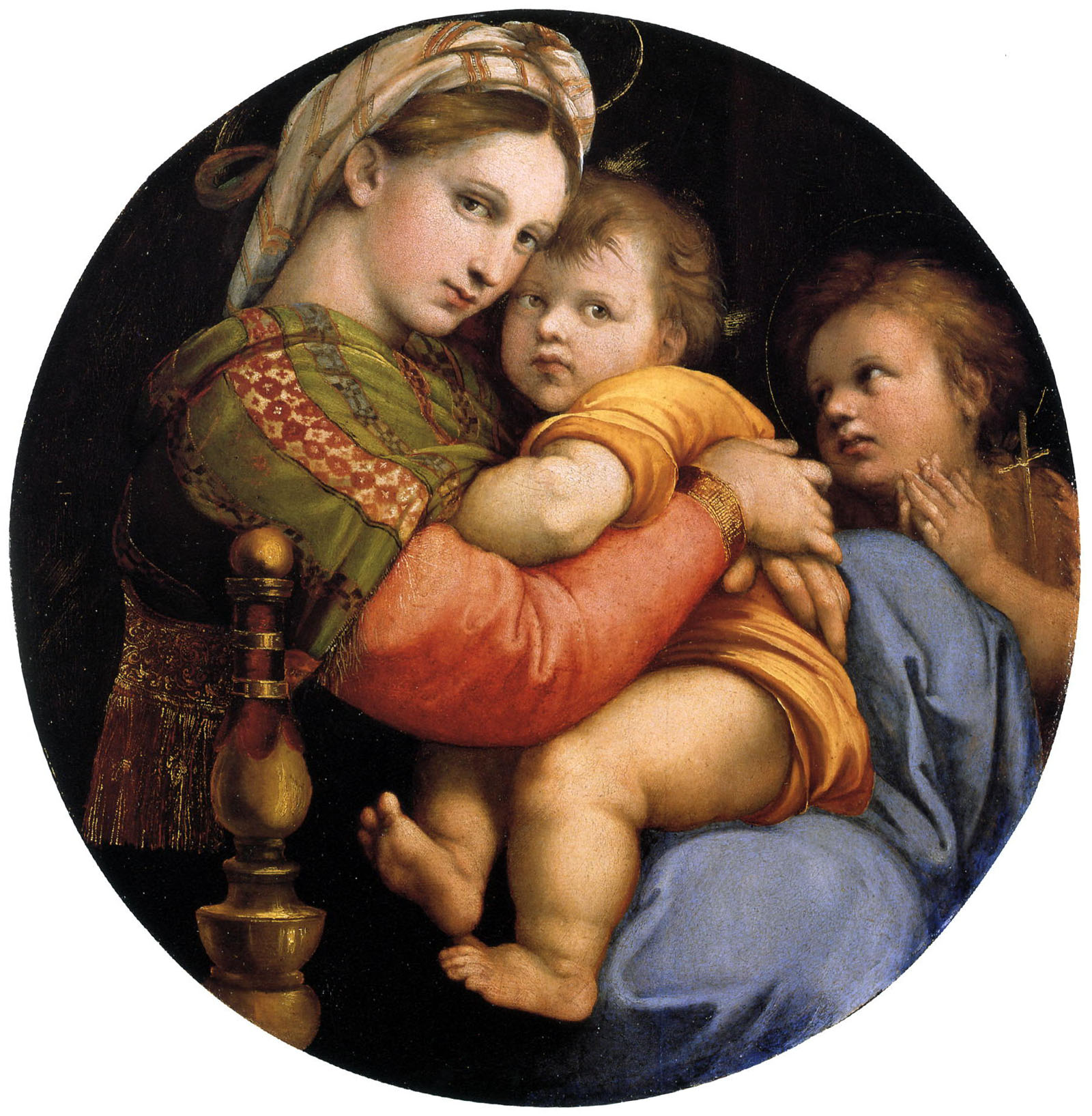
- Artist: Raphael
- Year: c. 1513–1514
- Medium: Oil on panel
- Dimensions: 71 cm × 71 cm (28 in × 28 in)
- Location: Palazzo Pitti, Florence

The Madonna della Seggiola or The Madonna della Sedia (28" in diameter (71 cm)) is an oil on panel Madonna painting by the High Italian Renaissance artist Raphael, executed c. 1513–1514, and housed at the Palazzo Pitti Collection in Florence, Italy. Although there is documentation on its arrival to its current location, Palazzo Pitti, it is still unknown who commissioned the painting; however, it has been in the Medici family since the 16th century.

It depicts Mary embracing the Christ Child while sitting in a chair as the young John the Baptist devoutly watches. The Madonna della Sedia is one of the single most important of Raphael's Madonnas. The painting also showcases Raphael's use of the tondo form and his naturalistic approach to depicting the Madonna.

== Description ==
The Madonna della Sedia is Raphael's most humanistic form of the Madonna. Throughout Raphael's life, this humanistic representation of the Madonna occupied his mind. The Madonna della Sedia is the incarnation of a realistic mother and child, representing human motherhood. Painted during his Roman period, this Madonna does not have the strict geometrical form and linear style of his earlier Florentine treatments of the same subject. The Madonna is portrayed subtly and naturalistically, including the drapery, her anatomy, and the movement of her body, as if it was a result of an immediate action. The Madonna della Sedia balanced simplification and detail with the treatment of her embroidered shawl, the directness of the figures and the touching of the two heads (Madonna and Christ child). Raphael dressed the Madonna in the Italian clothing of the time. Mary is depicted wearing a striped headdress, which falls down behind her back and compliments her richly colored ornamental dress with fringe.

The Madonna's image also shows less attention to careful selections, which takes the focus off refinement, and shifts it to more of a rapid representation of an observation or attitude. The Christ child and Mary are both in profile view in order to balance the composition, which resolved the issue of overcrowding. Mary is sitting in a position that is not easily replicated in reality, which allows the Christ child to sit comfortably, while balancing the figures in regards to the painting's round shape. The curvature of the two arms of Mary and Christ child in the foreground also lend themselves to a spherical form, which rounds out the composition. The chair dictates the outer limits of the composition and is the painting's namesake.

The colors play an important role in this painting, from the green embroidered garment to the cerulean blue or the juxtaposition of the Madonna's red sleeve with the Christ child's orange drapery, which adds an extra element of enrichment and a vibrancy to the color palette. The warmer colors seem to suggest the influence of Titian and Raphael's rival Sebastiano del Piombo.

== Provenance ==
Unfortunately, the Madonna della Sedia's commission is undocumented despite it being created while Raphael was spending a relatively well-documented period of twelve years in Rome. The painting was painted during the same time Raphael was working on the frescoes in the Vatican Stanze and loggia of the Vatican, including the paintings Incendio del Borgo, Battle of Ostia, and Coronation of Charlemagne. Most of Raphael's commissions for this period were under the strict guidance of Pope Leo X (Giovanni di Lorenzo de' Medici), who was known to be one of Raphael's biggest patrons at the time. While under Leo's patronage, Raphael rarely got commissions from outside of the pope's immediate circle. Leo X was also the successor to Pope Julius II (Giuliano della Rovere) who was another major patron of Raphael and a central contributor to the High Renaissance. However, it has been speculated that the painting was painted for Leo X, which also connects the painting to the Medici family during the sixteenth century while in Rome. The chair's finial in the Madonna della Sedia is evidence that supports the idea that the painting could have been commissioned for Pope Leo X. The finial takes on the form of a round ball, similar to the Medici's heraldic symbol, the palle, which is also seen in Leo's coat of arms. On the other hand, the chair's finial could also be a symbol for Pope Julius II and his family's symbol, the Della Rovere oak acorn, further adding to the mystery of the unidentified patron.

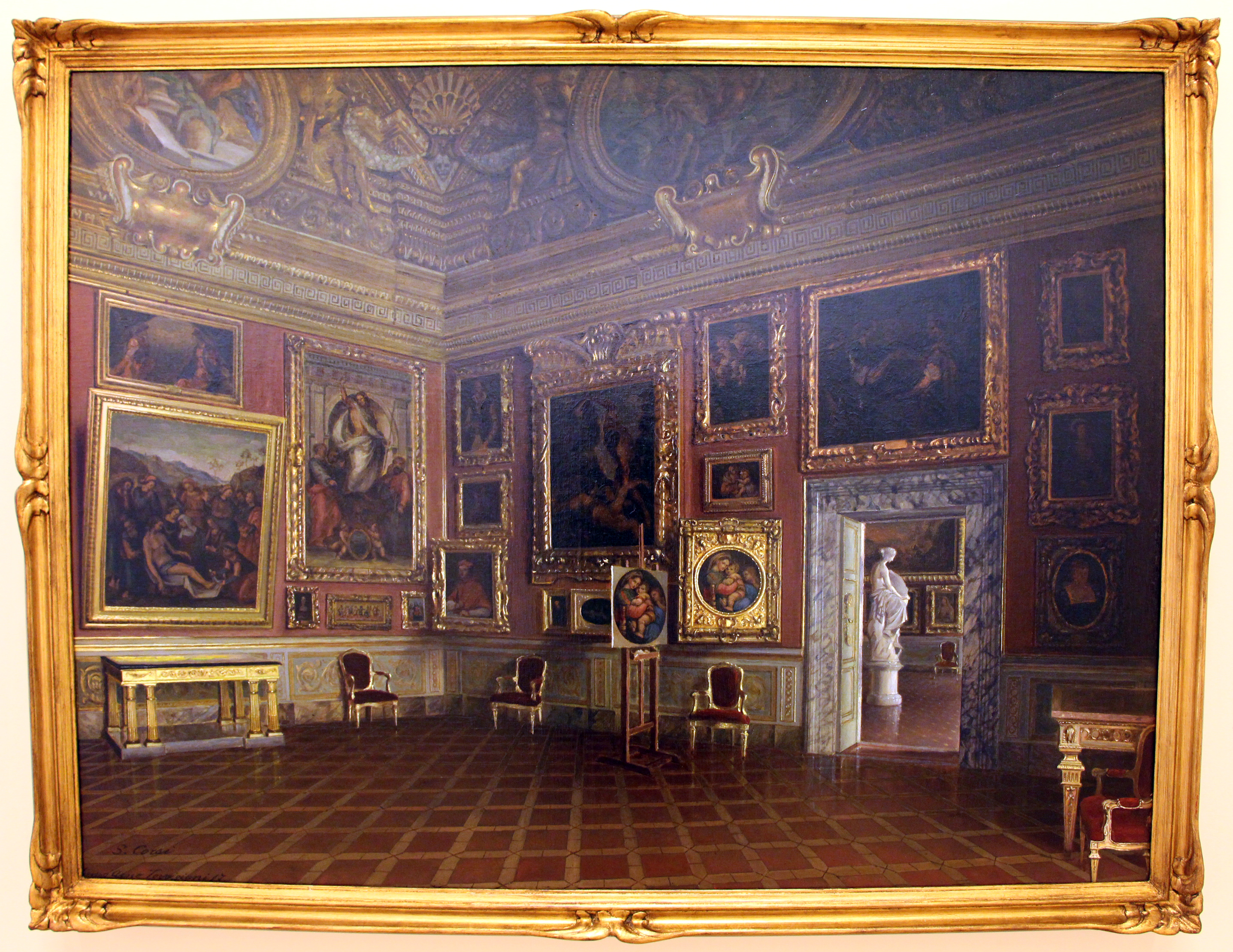
Sala di Saturno, Room of Saturn, at the Palazzo Pitti, 1920 ca. The Madonna della Sedia is to the left of the marble portal.

Already in the Gallerie Degli Uffizi, it was then moved to the Pitti Palace by the beginning of the eighteenth century. It was listed in inventories in 1723 and 1761 as being on display in the Grand Prince Ferdinando's bedroom. It was later moved throughout the Rooms of the Planets, starting with the Room of Jupiter (c. 1771) and later the Room of Mars (c. 1793), after the Leopoldine rearrangement of the picture gallery. Towards the end of the eighteenth century, it was taken during the Napoleonic looting of Florence and was in Paris from 1799 to 1815. Back in Florence, the painting has been in the Room of Saturn since 1882.

== Techniques ==
The Madonna della Sedia is the culmination of Raphael's use of the tondo form and influenced an equivalent singular male portrait, The Portrait of Baldassare Castiglione (c. 1514–1515). The painting is oil on panel, with St John the Baptist painted in a different key range. The painted black background is lacking the usual landscape, which typically would harmonize all the colors and figures. The composition is entirely from Raphael's hand, which was a result of him shuddering off the legacies of Leonardo da Vinci and Pietro Perugino, who early on had influenced his career and style substantially. The technical execution of the painting lies within its remarkable composition, which was originally envisioned as a rectangle. Raphael did not consider the circular shape during the preliminary sketches for this painting, even though it is a form he favored during and after his Florentine period. The figures' accommodation to the shape is skillful. The painting also revolutionized the Madonna format in the Renaissance style due to its departure from the pyramidal composition of the Madonna, Christ child, Saint Joseph, and by giving the painting a superficial background, which is radically different when comparing it to an earlier Madonna portrait, The Alba Madonna (c. 1510).

The painting also revolutionized singular portrait painting during the Renaissance by enlarging the figure's scale and how they compositionally occupy the entire plane. By radically changing the scale of the figures in this painting, allowing them to occupy most of the available space, the Christ child seems to be the basis of both the Madonna and Saint John the Baptist's proportions and relationship within the painting.

== Later influence ==
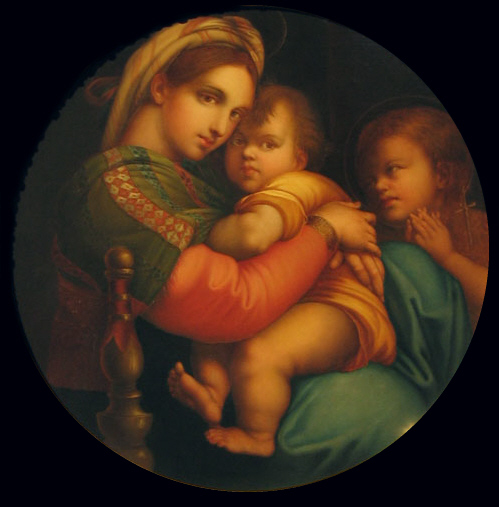
1880 copy seen next to the original Madonna della Sedia in the Room of Saturn at the Palazzo Pitti.

The Madonna della Sedia has been admired by many artists, poets, and engravers. It has been copied many times over and, historically, was considered one of the most revered of Raphael's Madonnas. There are a few enchanting legends connected to the Madonna della Sedia painting. One is about a beautiful Urbino peasant girl, Mary, who was as good as she was beautiful, charitable, and pious, who gave her assistance to an ill hermit she had stumbled upon. The hermit rewarded the girl by blessing her and stating that she would be painted as the mother of God. Many years later, on a sunny day holding her infant in the garden and with her toddler son playing at her knees, she was spotted by a handsome young man at her garden gate. That young man was Raphael Sanzio who immediately said he would like to paint her as she sat there with her two sons, later represented as the original Virgin, Christ child, and St. John.

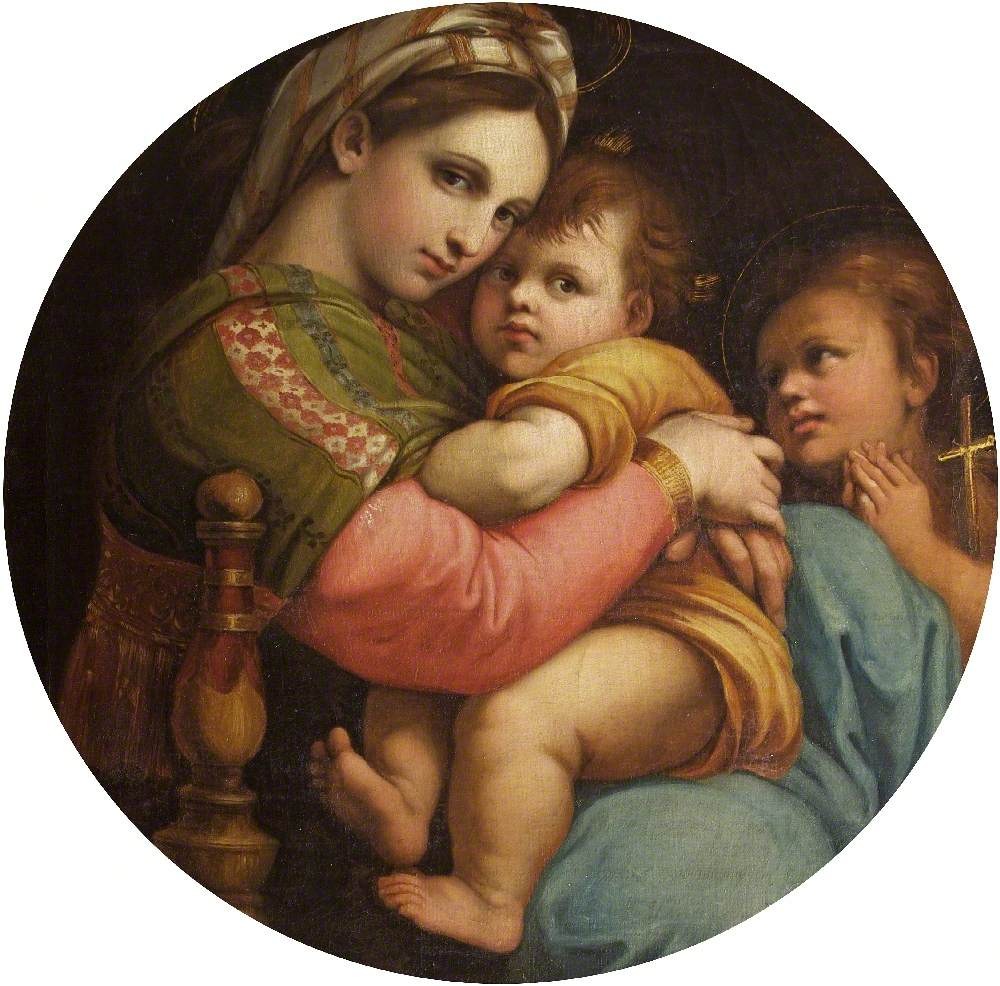
Prince Hoare the younger (1755-1834) - Madonna della sedia (copy after Raphael) - 732245 - National Trust

Because of the painting's roundness, it became the subject of another story in which a peasant girl saves a hermit, Father Bernado, from a pack of wolves in the branches of an oak, and the hermit prophesies that she will become immortalized for her good deed. Years later, the girl had two children, and the tree was made into wine barrels. Raphael happened upon the trio and used a barrel bottom to paint them. This scenario was the subject of an 1839 lithograph by August Hopfgarten and a painting by Johann Michael Wittmer.

Ingres greatly admired Raphael and paid tribute to him by including this painting in many of his works, such as in the background of Henri IV playing with his children and Raphael and La Fornarina on the table in front of the subject in his Portrait of monsieur Rivière. The image was worked into the carpet in Napoleon I on his Imperial Throne.

Johann Zoffany also included this painting along with many others in his 1770s painting of the Tribuna of the Uffizi.

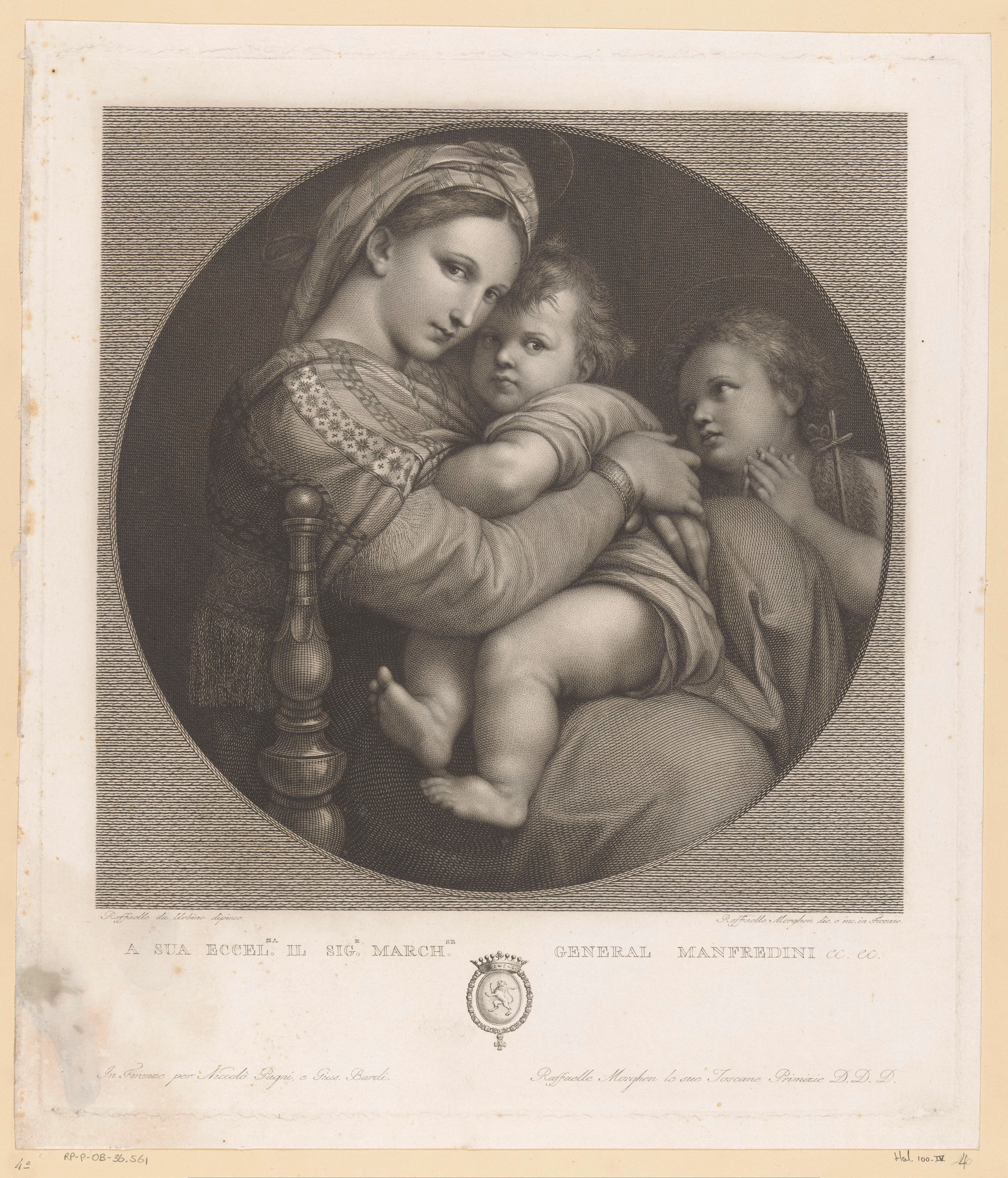
Madonna-St. John (Madonna della sedia copy), c. 1825, by Raphael Morghen, engraving RP-P-OB-36.561

In 1858, Nathaniel Hawthorne wrote that the painting was "the most beautiful picture in the world" after having seen it via "a hundred engravings and copies".

The depiction inspired Raphael Morghen and Niccolò De Antoni for a commission for Prince Consort for his Raphael Collection, which is conserved at the Royal Collection Trust.

== See also ==
- List of paintings by Raphael
- Madonna (art)
