= Cowdray =

Cowdray may refer to:

- Cowdray House, the ruins of one of England's great houses, outside the West Sussex town of Midhurst
- Cowdray Park, Gauteng, suburb of Johannesburg, South Africa
- Cowdray Park, West Sussex, country house at the centre of the 16,500-acre (67 km^{2}) Cowdray Estate
- Viscount Cowdray, of Cowdray in the County of Sussex, is a title in the Peerage of the United Kingdom
- Weetman Pearson, 1st Viscount Cowdray GCVO (1856–1927), engineer, oil industrialist, and owner of the Pearson conglomerate
- Weetman Pearson, 2nd Viscount Cowdray, DL (1882–1933), British peer and Liberal Party politician
