= Cowdray Park =

Cowdray Park refers to

- Cowdray Park, Gauteng, a suburb of Johannesburg, South Africa
- Cowdray Park, West Sussex, a country house and polo park in England
- Cowdray Park (constituency), district of the Parliament of Zimbabwe
