= Dunecht estate =

Private estate in Aberdeenshire, Scotland

Coordinates: 57°09′39″N 2°24′48″W

The Dunecht Estate is one of the largest private estates in Aberdeenshire, Scotland at 53,000 acres (210 km^{2}). It is owned by The Hon Charles Anthony Pearson, the younger son of the 3rd Viscount Cowdray. Dunecht's business interests include farming (in hand and let farms), forestry, field sports, minerals, let houses, commercial lets and tourism.

The main part of the estate lies between Banchory and Westhill, encompassing the village of Dunecht, the Loch of Skene and the stately home of Dunecht House. The estate grounds include a golf course and extensive areas of forestry and farming.

The estate also includes separate areas of land at Birse and Durris on Royal Deeside, Edinglassie in Strathdon and Dunnottar Castle near Stonehaven.

== Dunecht House ==
Built in 1820 as the family home of the Earl of Crawford and Balcarres, the house has a grand ballroom, chapel and observatory and is surrounded by extensive gardens. It also has an observatory, built by James Ludovic Lindsay, the 26th Earl of Crawford.

The house was sold by Charles Anthony Pearson, brother of the 4th Viscount Cowdray to the Scottish business entrepreneur Jamie Oag in 2012.

== Dunnottar Castle ==
Dunnottar Castle, a dramatic cliff top ruined fortress, is managed as a visitor attraction. The Castle is open to the public all year round. Dunnottar draws around 100,000 visitors each year since 2017.

== Forestry ==
The Estates' forestry business extends to 6,500 acres (26 km^{2}) of commercial woodland. Predominant tree species are scots pine, sitka spruce, Norway spruce, hybrid larch and Douglas fir. There are also substantial areas of native, semi-natural and plantation woodland where the primary management objective is conservation.

== Field sports ==
Field sports interests include grouse moors at Edinglassie, Forest of Birse and the Hill of Fare on Dunecht. An in-hand pheasant and partridge shoot is run at Dunecht while other Estates have low ground shooting tenants. The Estates have two salmon fishing beats on the River Dee, Lower Crathes/West Durris and Birse. The fishings at the former are let to Lax-a while the Birse lettings are managed direct. Other fishing interests include pike fishing on the Loch of Skene at Dunecht. Roe deer stalking is let by the week at Dunecht and Raemoir and Campfield.
