= Foster Barham Zincke =

Foster Barham Zincke

Foster Barham Zincke (5 January 1817 – 23 August 1893) was a clergyman, a traveller, and an antiquary. Zincke was born on 5 January 1817 at Eardley, a sugar estate in Jamaica. He was the third son of Frederick Burt Zincke, of Jamaica, by his wife, Miss Lawrence, a descendant of Henry Lawrence, president of Oliver Cromwell's council. He was fourth in descent from Christian Friedrich Zincke, the miniature and enamel painter. He entered Bedford School in 1828 and matriculated from Wadham College, Oxford, on 5 March 1835, graduating B.A. on 18 May 1839. He rowed in the Oxford boat at Henley in the same year. In 1840 he was ordained by Charles Richard Sumner, bishop of Winchester, to the curacy of Andover, and in 1841 he became curate of Wherstead and Freston, near Ipswich. In 1847, on the death of the vicar, George Capper, he was appointed vicar of Wherstead on the presentation of the Crown. Soon afterwards he began to contribute to Fraser's Magazine and the Quarterly Review, and in 1852 published Some Thoughts about the School of the Future (London, 8vo), in which he criticised with some severity the system of education pursued in the universities and public schools. Shortly afterwards he was appointed one of the queen's chaplains.

Zincke was a lover of travel. Immediately after leaving Oxford he visited France, and traversed a large part of Switzerland on foot. In September 1853 he went to Ireland, and convinced himself that the distressed state of the country was largely owing to past misrule. He spent the greater part of 1867 and 1868 in the United States of America, travelled eight thousand miles, and recorded his impressions and observations in Last Winter in the United States, being Table Talk collected during a Tour through the late Southern Confederation (London, 1868, 8vo). In 1871 he visited Egypt, and published The Egypt of the Pharaohs and of the Khedive (London, 8vo), which reached a second edition in 1873.

On 30 May 1865 Zincke was married at St Mary's, Bryanston Square, London, to Caroline Octavia, Lady Stevenson, daughter of Joseph Seymour Biscoe, and widow of Sir William Stevenson, K.C.B., governor of Mauritius. When in 1885 his stepson, Mr. Francis Seymour Stevenson, became liberal candidate for the Eye division of Suffolk (for which he sat till 1906), Zincke, who took a keen interest in politics, assisted in his victorious campaign. From that time until his death he continued to take an active part in local politics, and wrote a large number of pamphlets and addresses in support of his opinions, which were those of an advanced radical. He died at Wherstead on 23 August 1893, and was buried in the churchyard on 26 August. He left no children.

Besides the works already mentioned Zincke was author of:

- The Duty and Discipline of Extempore Preaching, London, 1866, 8vo; 2nd ed. 1866; American edition, New York, 1867, 8vo.
- A Month in Switzerland, London, 1873, 8vo.
- The Swiss Allmends … being a second Month in Switzerland, London, 1874, 8vo.
- A Walk in the Grisons, being a third Month in Switzerland, London, 1875, 8vo.
- The Plough and the Dollar, or the Englishry of a Century hence, London, 1883, 8vo.
- Materials for the History of Wherstead, Ipswich, 1887, 8vo; 2nd enlarged edit. London, 1893, 8vo; originally published in the Suffolk Chronicle.
- The Days of my Years, an autobiography, London, 1891, 8vo.
