= Annie Pearson, Viscountess Cowdray =

English philanthropist and suffragist

The Right Honourable The Viscountess Cowdray GBE
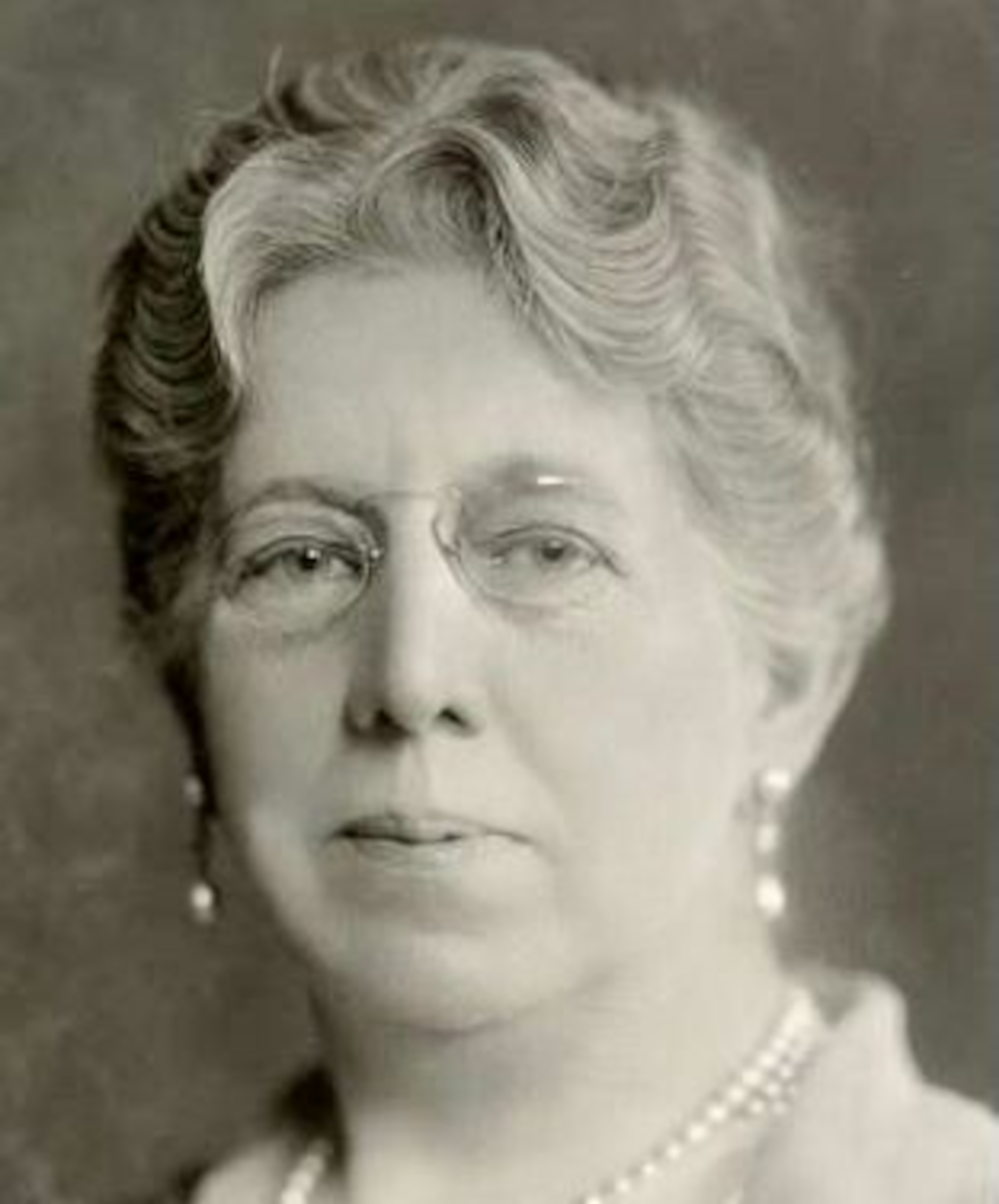
- Pearson during the First World War
- Born: Annie Cass; 4 June 1860; Bradford, Yorkshire, England
- Died: 15 April 1932 (aged 71); Paris, France
- Occupations: Philanthropist, suffragist
- Spouse: Weetman Pearson, 1st Viscount Cowdray (m. 1881; died 1927)
- Children: 4, including Harold Pearson, 2nd Viscount Cowdray, Clive Pearson and Gertrude Denman, Baroness Denman
- Parents: Sir John Cass (father); Hannah Gamble (mother)

Annie Pearson, Viscountess Cowdray, GBE (née Cass; 4 June 1860 – 15 April 1932) was an English philanthropist, suffragist and Liberal women's organiser. Nicknamed the "Fairy Godmother of Nursing", she was a major patron of nursing, supporting district nursing, the Royal College of Nursing, the Nation's Fund for Nurses and the Cowdray Club, a club for nurses and professional women.

Pearson also supported medical provision in Mexico, where Cowdray-backed nursing and hospital projects led to the Sanatorio Cowdray, later part of the Centro Médico ABC. She served as president of the Women's Liberal Federation from 1921 to 1923 and as honorary treasurer of the Liberal Women's Suffrage Union. In 1927 she became High Steward of Colchester, succeeding her husband, Weetman Pearson, 1st Viscount Cowdray; The Times reported that she was the first woman to hold the office. She was appointed Dame Grand Cross of the Order of the British Empire in 1932 for her benefactions to hospitals and nursing.

== Early life and family ==
Annie Cass was born in Bradford, Yorkshire, on 4 June 1860, the daughter of Sir John Cass and Hannah Gamble.

In 1881 she married Weetman Pearson, who built the family firm S. Pearson & Son into an international engineering and contracting business and later created the Mexican Eagle Petroleum Company. He was created a baronet in 1894, Baron Cowdray in 1910, and Viscount Cowdray in 1917.

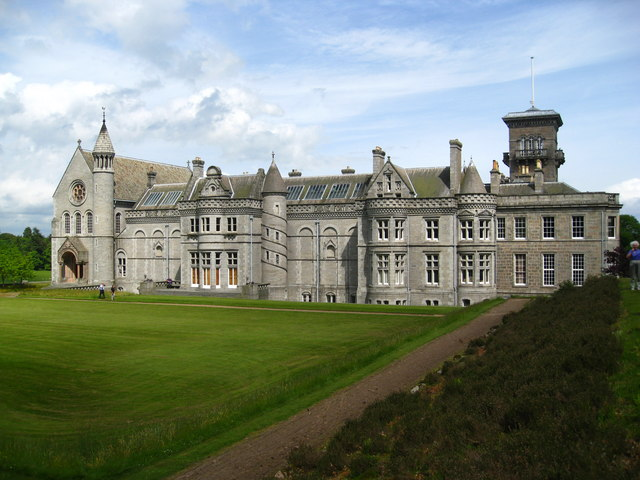
Dunecht House

The couple had four children:

- Harold Pearson, 2nd Viscount Cowdray
- Clive Pearson (1887–1965), who married Alicia, posthumous daughter of Baron Brabourne
- Francis Geoffrey Pearson (1891–1914), who served as a motorcycle courier in the Motor Transport Division of the British Expeditionary Force and died after being captured in France on 6 September 1914
- Gertrude Denman, Baroness Denman

Francis Geoffrey Pearson is buried at the British Cemetery at Montreuil-aux-Lions and is commemorated on the war memorial at Echt, Aberdeenshire.

Lord and Lady Cowdray moved into Dunecht House in 1919. Lord Cowdray died in 1927.

== First World War medical work ==
During the First World War, Pearson was involved in medical and welfare fundraising for wounded servicemen and nurses. A 1916 appeal poster for the Star and Garter Home asked women to send donations to Pearson as honorary treasurer of the British Women's Hospital Fund; the poster formed part of Punch's appeal for the Star and Garter Fund. The Imperial War Museums also identify her as treasurer of the Star and Garter Fund in its First World War women's war work portrait collection.

In 1926 the chapel at the Star and Garter Home was dedicated as a gift from Pearson, then president of the home, in memory of her son Francis Geoffrey Pearson.

In 1916 Alexander, Crown Prince of Serbia, then acting as regent, conferred on Pearson the Order of St. Sava Fourth Class for services connected with the Scottish Women's Hospital.

== Nursing philanthropy and the Cowdray Club ==
Pearson was closely associated with nursing philanthropy during and after the First World War. She was a patron of nursing and was associated with the Queen's Institute of District Nursing, helping to establish nursing services in rural parts of England and Scotland. The Royal College of Nursing also describes her as the "Fairy Godmother of Nursing".

When the College of Nursing, later the Royal College of Nursing, was established in 1916, Pearson became treasurer and chairman of the Tribute Fund Committee for the Nation's Fund for Nurses, which raised money for a benevolent fund for nurses and for the endowment of the college.

In 1920 Pearson bought 20 Cavendish Square, London, from H. H. Asquith and Margot Asquith to serve as a clubhouse for nurses. The building became the Cowdray Club, which opened in 1922, while a purpose-built College of Nursing building was added at the rear and formally opened in 1926.

The Survey of London states that Pearson bought 20 Cavendish Square to be a clubhouse for nurses, and that she funded the 1921–22 rebuilding along Henrietta Street to create a headquarters building for the College of Nursing. The redevelopment formed part of a phased building campaign by Sir Edwin Cooper.

In 1922 Pearson helped to establish the Cowdray Club, formally the Nation's Nurses and Professional Women's Club. The club gave nurses and other professional women social and professional space at a time when many London clubs excluded women. It also worked with charitable funds to support nurses and other women war workers who did not qualify for military pensions; some payments were described as pensions to recognise recipients' service and professional expertise. By 1923 the club had more than 3,000 members.

In 1932 Pearson established the Cowdray Scholarship Fund to support postgraduate study by trained nurses. On 2 June 1934, Queen Mary visited the College of Nursing to receive contributions towards a memorial to Pearson. The memorial appeal raised £6,054 0s. 2d. and was intended to endow the directorship of the education department and create a small bursary fund.

== Philanthropy in Mexico ==
Pearson's medical philanthropy in Mexico began before the construction of the Sanatorio Cowdray. Through the executive committee of the Lady Cowdray District Nursing Association, she opened a 14-bed clinic in Mexico City in 1911. The clinic served as a sanatorium until 1923 and treated employees of Lord Cowdray's companies and members of the British community in Mexico. Pearson brought nurses from England to provide home nursing in Mexico City.

Lord and Lady Cowdray also gave £100,000 towards the establishment of Cowdray Hospital in Mexico City. In July 1919 a site of 33,000 m^{2} (360,000 sq ft) was acquired through a donation of one million gold pesos from Lord and Lady Cowdray. The Sanatorio Cowdray, popularly known as the "English Hospital", was built there and opened on 11 November 1923. In 1941 it merged with the American Hospital to form the American British Cowdray Hospital, later part of the Centro Médico ABC.

== Suffrage and women's organisations ==
Pearson supported women's suffrage and Liberal women's organisation. She served as honorary treasurer of the Liberal Women's Suffrage Union. She was also a member of the Women's Liberal Federation and served as its president from 1921 to 1923.

During her presidency, the Women's Liberal Federation discussed issues including disarmament, free trade, temperance, housing, divorce law reform, education, electoral reform, and legislation affecting women and children. In 1921 she signed a petition calling for partial disarmament. During her presidency the federation also adopted a resolution calling for the release of Irish prisoners interned without trial and for investigation of official statements about their treatment.

Pearson was associated with several women's wartime and professional organisations, including the Women's Institute, the London Committee of the Scottish Women's Hospitals, the South London Hospital for Women and Children, and suffrage organisations. She was an early supporter of the Women's Engineering Society. Her granddaughter Anne Judith Denman studied engineering at Cambridge University in the 1920s.

== Civic philanthropy and public offices ==
Pearson served as a burgess in Aberdeen, where she and her husband donated Cowdray Hall to the city. Cowdray Hall forms part of the Aberdeen Art Gallery complex. Aberdeen's attempt to consolidate the city hospitals received a subscription of £25,000 from Pearson in 1927 and a matching subscription from Lord Cowdray.

In Colchester, Lord and Lady Cowdray helped to fund the purchase of Colchester Castle and the clearance of the entrance area used for the town's war memorial. The Imperial War Museums War Memorials Register records that the purchase of the castle and clearance costs were covered by a £10,000 donation from Lord and Lady Cowdray, and that they offered a further £10,000 towards the purchase of the Holly Trees Estate, which became part of Castle Park. Historic England records that the castle was purchased by the council with funds donated by Lord Cowdray, who also paid for the park entrance gates; the war memorial itself was paid for by public subscription and unveiled on 24 May 1923.

Lord Cowdray had served as Liberal member of parliament for Colchester. In 1927 Pearson was elected High Steward of Colchester, succeeding her husband. The National Portrait Gallery identifies her as High Steward of Colchester. The Times reported that she was the first woman to hold the office.

== Honours, portraits and death ==
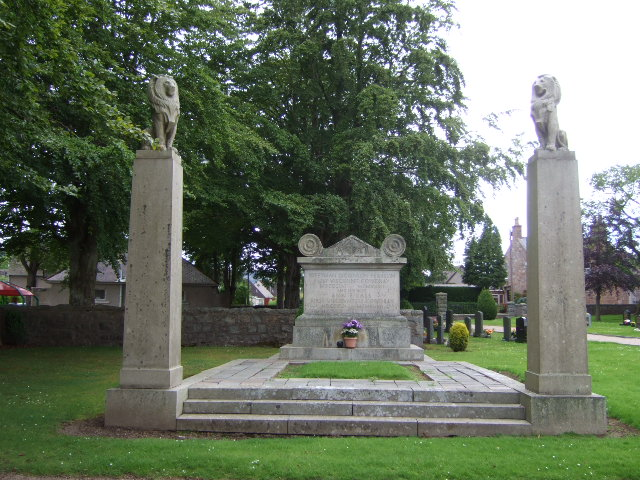
Family tomb of the Viscounts Cowdray

Pearson was appointed Dame Grand Cross of the Order of the British Empire in the 1932 New Year Honours. The London Gazette stated that the appointment recognised her benefactions, particularly those connected with hospitals and the nursing profession.

Pearson was an art collector and patron of the arts. She commissioned the painting The Red Ruin by James Pryde. She sat for several portraits, including photographs by Bassano Ltd held by the National Portrait Gallery, London. She was also painted by John Singer Sargent and William Orpen. Her portrait by Orpen, Annie Pearson, née Cass (1860–1932), Viscountess Cowdray, High Steward of Colchester, is held by Colchester and Ipswich Museums.

Pearson's great-grandson Iain Murray became the 10th Duke of Atholl. According to later accounts of the Atholl estate, Pearson helped to protect Blair Castle by paying bank debt and providing funds to her granddaughter Angela Pearson, Murray's mother, for the creation of the Blair Charitable Trust. Her role in preserving Blair Castle was also discussed in the BBC Two documentary The Last Dukes.

Pearson died on 15 April 1932 at the Hôtel Ritz Paris. She was buried at Saint-Germain-en-Laye and is commemorated on the Pearson memorial at Echt, Aberdeenshire.
