= Negatives (film) =

1968 British film by Peter Medak

- US film poster
- Directed by: Peter Medak
- Screenplay by: Peter Everett; Roger Lowry
- Based on: Negatives; 1961 novel by Peter Everett
- Produced by: Judd Bernard
- Starring: Peter McEnery; Diane Cilento; Glenda Jackson; Maurice Denham
- Cinematography: Ken Hodges
- Edited by: Barrie Vince
- Music by: Basil Kirchin
- Production companies: Kettledrum Films; Narizzano Productions; The Walter Reade Organization
- Distributed by: Crispin Films
- Release date: September 1968
- Running time: 98 minutes
- Country: United Kingdom
- Language: English

Negatives is a 1968 British erotic drama film directed by Peter Medak and starring Peter McEnery, Glenda Jackson and Diane Cilento. It is based on the 1961 novel of the same name by Peter Everett.

A couple act out their erotic fantasies by dressing up as an Edwardian murderer and his lover.

== Plot ==
Theo and Vivien are couple whose relationship is based on their fantasy role-playing: Theo is the wife-murderer, Dr. Crippen, and Vivien is both his wife Belle or his mistress Ethel. They meet Reingard, a German photographer who moves in with them. She encourages Theo in a new fantasy as German WW1 flying ace Manfred von Richthofen, also known as "The Red Baron". The fantasy becomes reality when they buy a real plane for Theo to fly.

== Cast ==
- Peter McEnery as Theo
- Diane Cilento as Reingard
- Glenda Jackson as Vivien
- Billy Russell as old man
- Norman Rossington as auctioneer
- Stephen Lewis as the dealer
- Maurice Denham as the father

== Critical reception ==
The Monthly Film Bulletin wrote:

A film about the games people play. Or rather, the film itself is the game, since screenwriter Peter Everett, adapting his own novel, and director Peter Medak, directing his first feature, keep the rules securely buried and only they, presumably, can distinguish the shifting levels of fantasy and reality that in the film are stylistically and thematically inseparable: a casual lack of discrimination that finally kills all interest in the proceedings, real or unreal. Negatives begins with Theo and Vivien in full mock-Edwardian battle dress – Theo's idea for a nice quiet afternoon on the roof in the sun spoilt by Vivien's constant need to harass and provoke him. The disorder in the air, the brittle tension between the two, is underlined by the messy roving of the camera: Vivien's sharp, bitchy remarks followed by long, hasty pans to Theo, standing or sitting, inert and morose. The same fussy technique, a fidgety choice of the odd camera angle or a sudden, swirling movement, only labours not so much the oddity, the tragic fantasy of this hermetic ménage a trois, as the perversity, the dramatic capriciousness that conveniently produces Reingard to provide Theo with a new part once the old one is hanging in tatters. By the film's end, with Theo sitting bolt upright in the plane, blood trickling from one corner of his mouth, it is reasonable to ask, but more difficult to care, whether this is intended to suggest actual suicide or merely the furthest extension of his fantasy, on a level with the tinted footage of dogfighting aircraft; or whether, having reached the extreme of his solitary male fantasy, Theo has symbolically 'died'.

In The New York Times, Vincent Canby found the film "so good in so many of its particulars that it is hard to believe that it finally goes so wrong with such a straight face ... It actually is quite a good movie until it is taken over by the fantasies – and by the anxious hand of a young (31 years old) director who wants to make a meaningful film. Negatives is the first feature by Peter Medak and much of what he does is excellent. The movie has the careful tempo of a minuet, which counterpoints its desperate eroticism. It is beautifully photographed with the same tactile quality that may have been the only really distinguishing feature of Blow-Up. and it is played by three performers who are always interesting to watch"

Dennis Schwartz wrote, "It's a fun watch because it's carried off with such glee, just don't expect any help from the story getting to any significant psychological meanings and be prepared to see how much you like the film when it turns ugly."

Leslie Halliwell said: "Smoothly done but impenetrable psychological poppycock: what is fact and what is fancy, only the author knows."
