= Last of the Long-haired Boys =

1968 British film by Peter Everett

The Last of the Long Haired Boys
- Richard Todd and Malcolm Tierney in the film
- Directed by: Peter Everett
- Written by: Peter Everett
- Produced by: Michael Pearson
- Starring: Richard Todd; Gillian Raine; Patrick Barr
- Cinematography: Ken Hodges
- Edited by: Paul Davies
- Music by: Ernest Berk
- Production company: Cupid Productions
- Release date: 1968
- Running time: 73 minutes
- Country: United Kingdom
- Language: English

Last of the Long-haired Boys (also known as Peter Everett's the Last of the Long Haired Boys) is a 1968 British drama film directed and written by Peter Everett and starring Richard Todd, Gillian Raine and Patrick Barr.

== Plot summary ==
After the end of the Second World War ex-RAF fighter pilot Trigg cannot adjust to civilian life. Obsessed by wartime memories he becomes increasingly delusional and lost in an internal world. On the verge of madness he puts on his wartime uniform and walks to a deserted airfield. His son meets him and steers him back to reality.

== Cast ==
- Richard Todd as Trigg
- Gillian Raine as Mara Trigg
- Patrick Barr as Conyers
- Malcolm Tierney as Jason Trigg
- Sonia Dresdel as Mrs. Dearborn
- Susan Jameson as Bimba
- David Markham as Brindle
- Peter Marinker as Jamie Dearborn
- Michael Bishop as wounded pilot

== Production ==
The film was made by a new company, Cupid Productions, financed by Michael Pearson. In his autobiography Richard Todd wrote that he loved the script calling it "a gripping, harrowing story", and that he agreed to make the film and let Everett direct, adding: "As soon as our location shooting started at Hawkinge in Kent, I began to doubt my wisdom. The first day was a nightmare of incompetence and chaos. Peter Everett obviously had little idea of how to get his story on to the cinema screen, and apparently no coherent schedule."

== Release ==
According to the BFI, "Release was planned for June 1969. Although unreleased commercially, undoubtedly some screenings did take place." The BBFC lists a release date of 1 July 1969, and has classified the film as an A certificate.
