= High Steward of Colchester =

The High Steward of Colchester is a ceremonial office awarded by Colchester City Council, Essex, England.

The stewardship was established by royal charter of Charles I dated 9 July 1635. The charter, naming all the officials and councillors of the Council, stipulated that:

"henceforth for ever there may be and shall be in the borough a High Steward to advise and direct the Mayor and Commonality in the chief business touching that borough which High Steward shall continue in the office of High Steward during his natural life."

The 1835 Municipal Corporation Act abolished most High Stewards and only allowed Colchester’s petition to retain a High Steward on condition that the wording of the Charter "...advise and direct..." be reduced to merely "...advise..."

The office was held by Professor Ivor Crewe until his resignation in July 2009 and remained vacant from 2009 to 2015.

Following his defeat at the 2015 UK General Election, former Colchester MP, Sir Bob Russell, was appointed to the position, which he currently holds. He held the seat for the Liberal Democrats for 18 years, from 1997 to 2015.

== Office holders ==
- Henry Rich, 1st Earl of Holland, 1635–at least 1641
- Christopher Monck, 2nd Duke of Albemarle, who lived in Jamaica at the time of his appointment, and never even visited the town. 1688
- Charles Crickitt, who duelled with a local member of the clergy.
- John Pitt, 2nd Earl of Chatham 1807–1818
- John Round 1818–1860, former Tory MP for Ipswich and Maldon.
- John Gurdon Rebow, of Wivenhoe House, MP for Colchester from 1865. 1861–1870
- George Henry Errington, banker and former High Sheriff of Essex 1870–1883
- Francis Cowper, 7th Earl Cowper
- Weetman Pearson, 1st Viscount Cowdray 1910–1927, industrialist and former MP for Colchester
- Annie Pearson, Viscountess Cowdray 1927–1932 in succession to her husband.
- Sir William Gurney Benham, three times mayor and local notable 1933–1944
- Archibald Wavell, 1st Earl Wavell, Viceroy of India 1947–1950.
- Sir Percy Saunders, businessman, former mayor and member of Colchester council for 30 years. 1950–1962.
- Cuthbert Alport, Baron Alport, former MP for Colchester. October 1967 – 1988. 21st High Steward
- Professor Ivor Crewe, 2003–2009. 22nd High Steward
- Sir Bob Russell, former MP for Colchester, 2015–present. 23rd High Steward
