= Michael Pearson, 4th Viscount Cowdray =

British peer and film producer (born 1944)

The Right Honourable The Viscount Cowdray
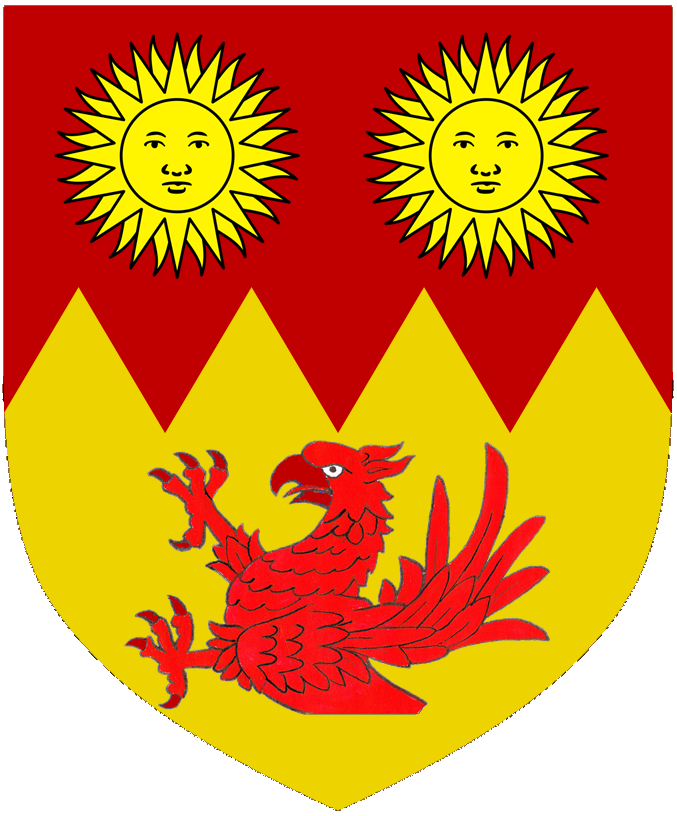
- Arms
- Born: 17 June 1944 (age 82)
- Spouses: Ellen Erhardt (m. 1977; div. 1984) Marina Rose Cordle (m. 1987; sep. 2025)
- Issue: 6, including Peregrine Pearson
- Heir: Peregrine Pearson
- Parents: Weetman Pearson, 3rd Viscount Cowdray; Lady Anne Pamela Bridgeman

Michael Orlando Weetman Pearson, 4th Viscount Cowdray, DL (born 17 June 1944) of Cowdray Park in West Sussex, is a landowner in West Sussex with 16,500 acres (6,700 ha) and is a major shareholder of the FTSE 100 company Pearson plc, the construction, now publishing, company founded by his ancestor in the 19th century.

== Early life ==
He is the eldest son and heir of Weetman Pearson, 3rd Viscount Cowdray (1910–1995) of Cowdray Park, Sussex and of Dunecht House, Aberdeenshire, by his first wife Lady Anne Pamela Bridgeman (1914-2009), a daughter of Orlando Bridgeman, 5th Earl of Bradford (1873–1957) and a first cousin of Princess Alice, Duchess of Gloucester. His parents separated when he was two years old.

== Career ==
He attended Gordonstoun, a boarding school in Elgin, Moray, Scotland, after which he served the British Army for two years, worked as a financier in the City of London and briefly as a farmer. In the late 1960s, he became a film producer, running Cupid Productions, a film production company. He produced Sympathy for the Devil, a film starring The Rolling Stones and directed by Jean-Luc Godard, and Vanishing Point in 1971. In 1985, he was listed in Debrett's Peerage as a resident of Le Schuylkill, a high-rise building in Monaco. Later in the 1980s, he returned to England. He was a director of the jewellers Theo Fennell Plc. He has served on the board of trustees of the Tibet House Trust for 20 years.

=== Cowdray Park estate ===
In 1995 he inherited his 16,500-acre (6,700 ha) paternal estate at Cowdray Park, in West Sussex, purchased by his great-grandfather in 1909, now containing the mansion house known as Cowdray Park, a polo club, a golf club, a dairy herd, forestry, 330 houses, several farms and much of the town of Midhurst. In and in 2011, he put the 16 bedroom mansion house up for sale via agents Knight Frank, at an asking price of £25 million, including two lakes, two swimming pools, six cottages, 12 flats, a bowling alley, cricket pitch, polo field, but with only 110 acres (45 ha) of the estate. In 2017 having failed to find a buyer for the house, he took it off the market and drew up plans to convert the two wings into 7 short-leasehold luxury apartments with the reception areas to be hired out for conferences, corporate events and weddings.

== Personal life and family ==
By his girlfriend Barbara Ray, he had a son out of wedlock:

- Sebastian William Orlando Pearson (born 1970)

In 1977, he married Ellen Erhardt, a daughter of Hermann Erhardt, of Munich. They divorced in 1984.

In 1987, he married Marina Rose Cordle, second daughter of John Cordle, a Conservative Member of Parliament, by whom he has five children:

- Hon. Eliza Anne Venetia Pearson (born 31 May 1988)
- Hon. Emily Jane Marina Pearson (born 13 December 1989)
- Hon. Catrina Sophie Lavinia Pearson (born 13 March 1991)
- Hon. Peregrine John Dickinson Pearson (born 27 October 1994), eldest legitimate son and heir;
- Hon. Montague Orlando William Pearson (born 17 May 1997).

== Filmography ==
=== As a producer ===
- Last of the Long-haired Boys (1968)
- Sympathy for the Devil (1968)
- The Legend of Spider Forest – AKA Venom (1971)

=== As an executive producer ===
- Vanishing Point (1971)

Peerage of the United Kingdom
Preceded by Weetman Pearson	Viscount Cowdray; 1995-present	Incumbent
