= Dunecht House =

Stately home in Aberdeenshire, Scotland

Coordinates: 57.1610°N 2.4131°W

Designations

Inventory of Gardens and Designed Landscapes in Scotland
- Official name: Dunecht House
- Designated: 1 July 1987
- Reference no.: GDL00153

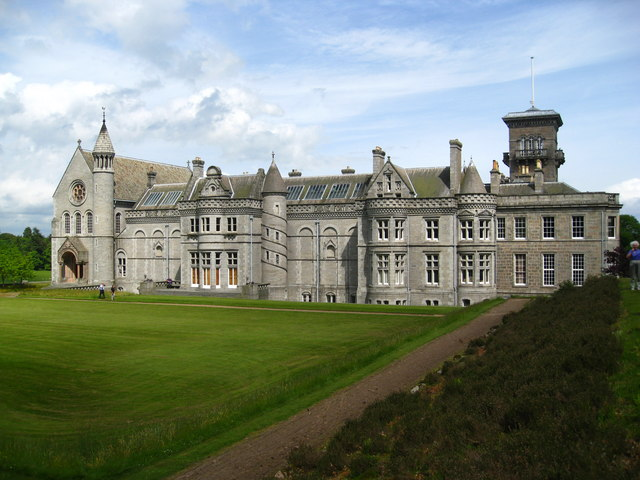
Dunecht House

Dunecht House is a stately home on the Dunecht estate in Aberdeenshire, Scotland. The house is protected as a category A listed building, and the grounds are included on the Inventory of Gardens and Designed Landscapes in Scotland, the national listing of significant gardens.

== History ==
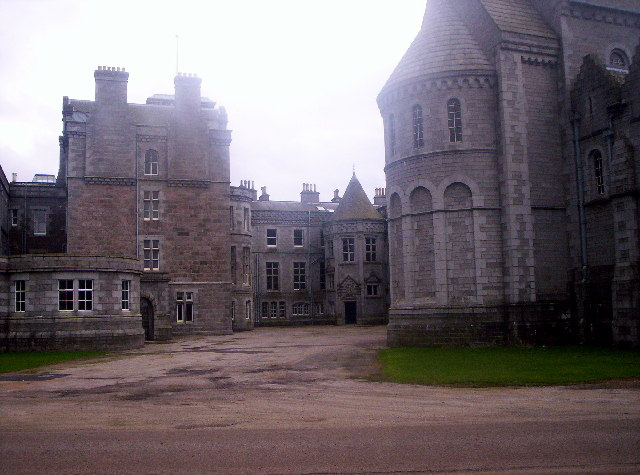

The barony of Echt had been owned by the Forbes family since 1469 and the original mansion house, built in 1705, was known as Housedale. The present mansion is located slightly to the south-west of it. In 1820 William Forbes commissioned the Aberdeen City Architect John Smith to design a replacement house in a basic two-storey Grecian-inspired style. The house and lands were sold to the 24th Earl of Crawford in 1845 for £117,000. His main family residence was Haigh Hall in Lancashire and it was under the instruction of the 25th Earl of Crawford, his eldest son who succeeded him in 1869, that further extensive additions were made to the Dunecht mansion. This phase of architectural work was undertaken by Smith's son William and spanned from 1855 to 1859.

Usually an annual ball was held at either Haigh Hall or the family's London home but in October 1871 it was hosted at Dunecht. Attendees included the Gordons from Cluny Castle, the Abercrombies from Forglen House, the Irvines from Drum Castle and many other dignitaries from throughout the north-east.

Additional internal renovations were commissioned around 1867 and undertaken by George Edmund Street. A fire in early November 1872 caused some damage to the four-storey north-west wing which housed servant quarters.

Alexander, 25th Earl of Crawford, died in 1880 and his body was stolen in 1881. His body had been removed from a burial vault within the private chapel but the removal of the body was not discovered until several months later after a note signed 'Nabob' was received. After extensive searches the body was eventually found on 18 July 1882 near a gravel pit close to the house. The body was later transported to Haigh Hall and buried again in the family vault.

The estate was offered for sale in 1886 but remained unsold until purchased by A. C. Pirie in 1900. Pirie added a new conservatory and dining room and also commissioned extra work on some of the estate buildings. The mansion was leased to the 1st Viscount Cowdray and his wife, Annie, Viscountess Cowdray, in 1907. Lord Cowdray bought the estate in 1912, going on to commission further significant extensions until 1920. These were undertaken by Sir Aston Webb. Internal changes were undertaken to commence from 1924. Lord Cowdray died in his sleep at the mansion on 1 May 1927 and is buried at Echt. He was succeeded by his son, the 2nd Viscount Cowdray, who continued the internal renovations that were completed by c. 1932.

It also has an observatory, built by the 26th Earl of Crawford in 1872. Later, in 1888 he gifted his extensive library and all the observatory contents to the nation, on condition that the government build a new Royal Observatory, Edinburgh, rather than close it down following the resignation of then-Astronomer Royal for Scotland, Charles Piazzi Smyth.

== Architecture ==
The original design for the mansion by John Smith in 1820 was constructed from granite, had a full basement, three main reception rooms.

Initial extensions designed by Smith's son built out to the west of the existing house. These incorporated a prominent Italianate tower in the style of Osborne House and canted bays on two gables. Large reception rooms were housed within these. The earlier part of the mansion had a new galleried staircase as well as other refurbishments made to it. A galleried staircase was added to the original part of the mansion and a porte-cochère in a Doric style graced the entrance.

The mansion formerly had a large chime of eight bells by John Warner and Sons hung in its tower. However these were sold in 1996, and since 1999, have served as the church bells of St Mary's, Haddington, in East Lothian.

== Gardens and wider estate ==
The Tower lodges and gates at Loch of Skene are also category A listed. Several other structures within the estate are designated category B including the lodges. The formal gardens are sited to the west and south of the mansion and feature two large terraces designed by Aston Webb in the early 20th-century.

== 21st-century ==
The house was owned by Charles Anthony Pearson, brother of the 4th Viscount Cowdray, although it was unoccupied from 1998 while remaining in his ownership. It was marketed for sale in 2012 and purchased by Jamie Oag, the owner of Spex Group and founder of Optima.

== Gallery ==
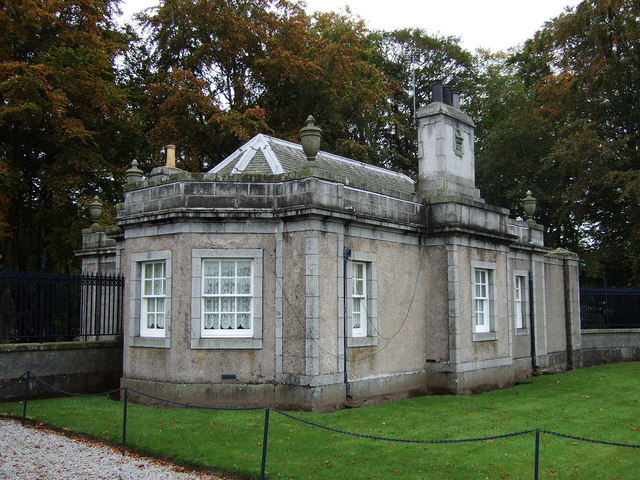

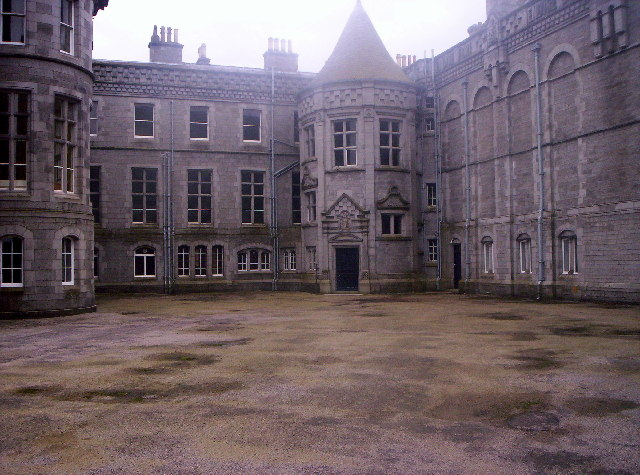
The inner courtyard

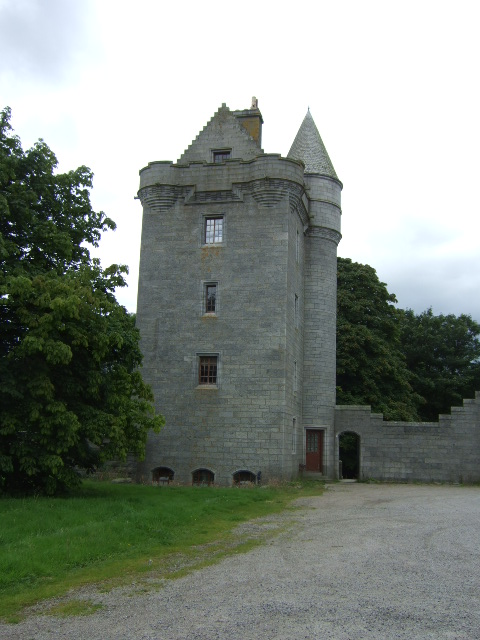

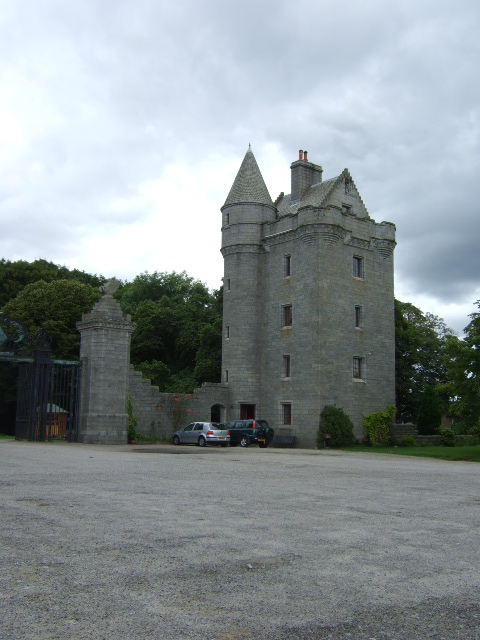

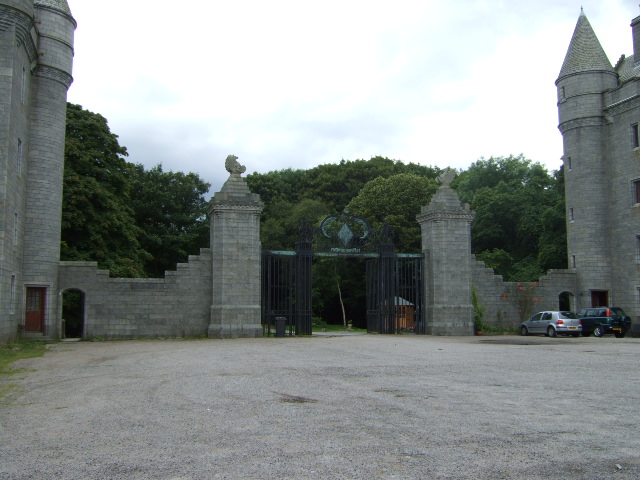

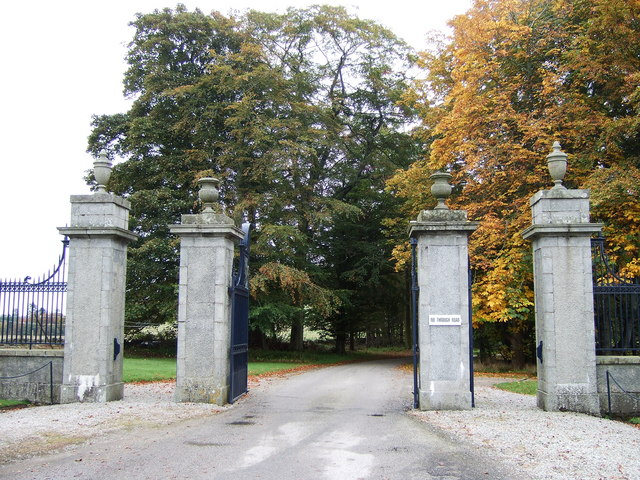

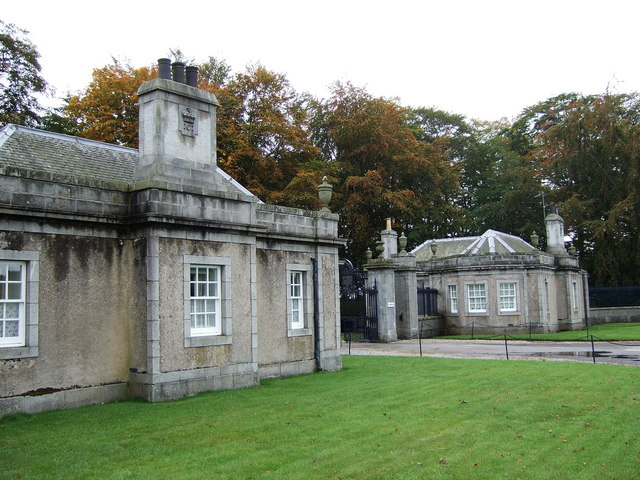

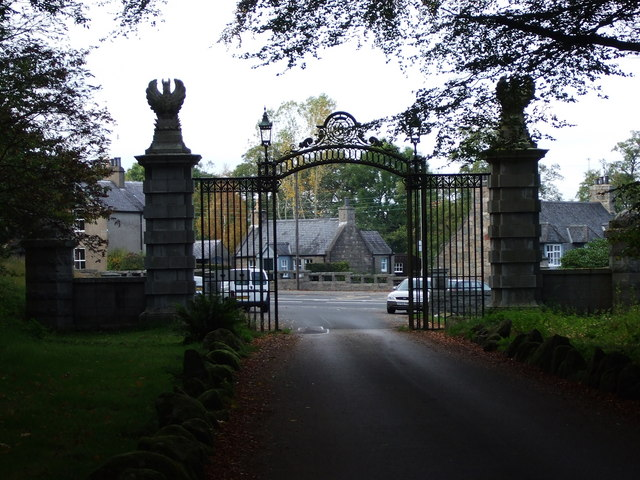

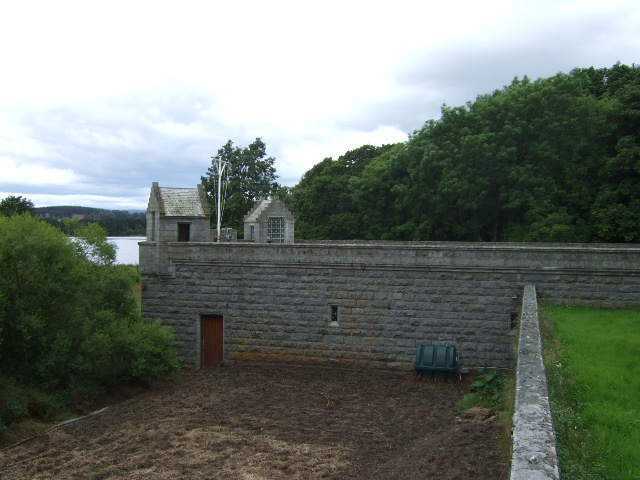

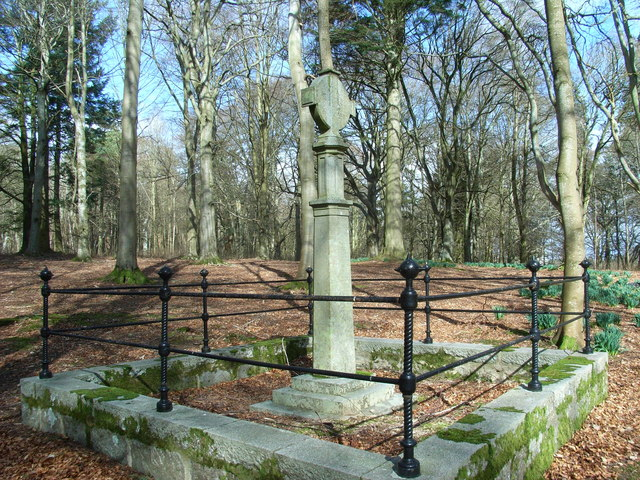
Memorial on the site of where the Earl's body was hidden
