= John Pearson, 3rd Viscount Cowdray =

British peer, businessman and polo player

The Viscount Cowdray
- Born: 27 February 1910
- Died: 19 January 1995 (aged 84)
- Spouses: Lady Anne Bridgeman (m. 1939; div. 1950) Elizabeth Mather-Jackson (m. 1953)
- Issue: 6, including Michael Pearson, 4th Viscount Cowdray
- Parents: Harold Pearson, 2nd Viscount Cowdray; Agnes Beryl Spencer-Churchill

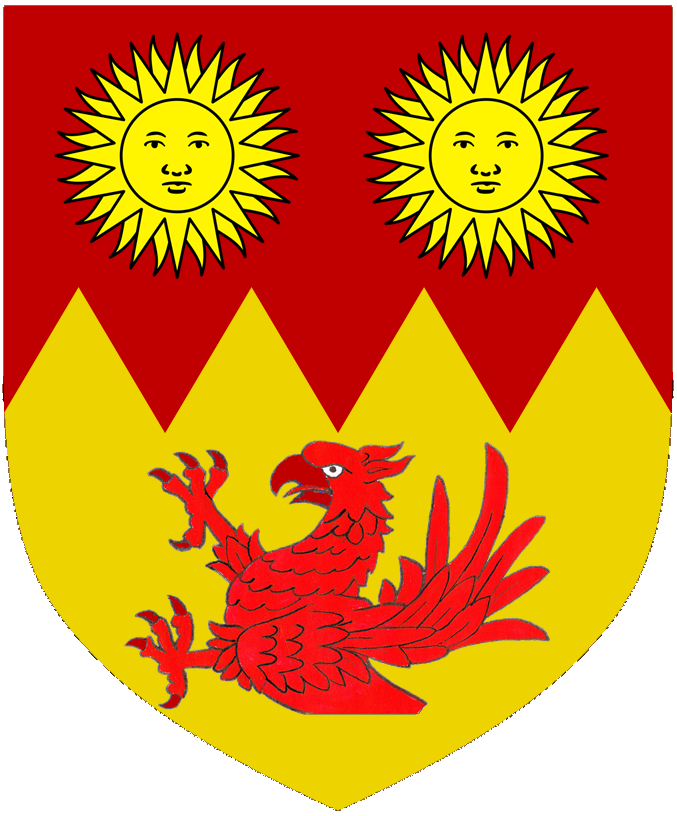
Shield of arms of The Viscount Cowdray

Lt Col (Weetman) John Churchill Pearson, 3rd Viscount Cowdray (27 February 1910 - 19 January 1995) TD DL was a British peer, businessman and polo player.

== Early life ==
Weetman John Churchill Pearson and his twin sister, Angela was born on 27 February 1910 in Whitehall. They had four sisters.

His father was Harold Pearson, 2nd Viscount Cowdray. His paternal grandfather was Weetman Pearson, 1st Viscount Cowdray.

His mother was Agnes Beryl Spencer-Churchill. His maternal great-grandfather was George Spencer-Churchill, 6th Duke of Marlborough.

He attended Eton College and graduated from Christ Church, Oxford. He resided in Cowdray Park in Midhurst, West Sussex.

== Career ==
=== Military career ===
Pearson fought in the Second World War, and his left arm was amputated as a result. He received the Territorial Decoration for his service. He attained the rank of lieutenant-colonel from 1940 to 1941 in the British Home Guard.

He served as parliamentary private secretary to the Under-Secretary of State for Air, Harold Balfour, 1st Baron Balfour of Inchrye, from 1941 to 1942.

=== Deputy lord lieutenant ===
He served as deputy lieutenant) of Sussex in 1945, during the tenure of Charles Wyndham, 3rd Baron Leconfield as the Lord Lieutenant of Sussex, which spanned 1917 to 1949.

=== Business career ===
He served as chairman of S. Pearson & Son Ltd from 1954 to 1977, and as president of Pearson PLC from 1983 to 1995.

=== Polo ===
When he went up to Oxford he played for four years with the Oxford polo team. In 1932 he captained the Oxford team which won the Tyro Cup, then still a Hurlingham tournament (now at Cowdray).

He was the main driving force for the revival of polo in England after the Second World War. He played polo despite having lost his arm at Dunkirk. He had an artificial limb fitted so he could continue to play.

In 1948 or 1949, he played with the English team in the Argentinian Open. In 1951 he revived the Coronation Cup and in 1956 he launched his own major trophy, the Cowdray Park Gold Cup, which remains to this day the main trophy for British Open Polo.

He served as steward and chairman of the Hurlingham Polo Association from 1947 to 1967.

== Marriages and children ==
Cowdray married Lady Anne Bridgeman, a daughter of Orlando Bridgeman, 5th Earl of Bradford, on 19 July 1939. They had three children:

- Hon Mary Teresa Pearson (born 3 June 1940)
- Hon Liza Jane Pearson (born 30 March 1942)
- Michael Orlando Weetman Pearson, 4th Viscount Cowdray (born 17 June 1944)

Viscount and Viscountess Cowdray divorced in 1950 and on 4 March 1953 Cowdray married Elizabeth Mather-Jackson, daughter of Sir Anthony Mather-Jackson, 6th Baronet. They also had three children:

- Hon Lucy Pearson (born 11 April 1954)
- Hon Charles Anthony Pearson (born 5 March 1956)
- Hon Rosanna Pearson (born 1 July 1959)

Cowdray died on 19 January 1995, at the age of eighty-four. Viscountess Cowdray died on 23 September 2011.

Peerage of the United Kingdom
Preceded by Harold Pearson	Viscount Cowdray; 1933–1995	Succeeded by Michael Pearson
