= Billy Russell (comedian) =

British comedian and character actor (1893–1971)

- Born: Adam George Brown; 16 July 1893; Birmingham, England
- Died: 25 November 1971 (aged 78); London, England
- Occupations: Comedian, actor
- Years active: 1900–1971

Adam George Brown (16 July 1893 – 25 November 1971), who used the stage name Billy Russell, was a British comedian and character actor.

== Biography ==
He was born in Birmingham, and first appeared on stage at the age of seven in 1900 in a theatrical show in Gloucester. He also worked in funfairs, and before the First World War as a child actor in the north of England, the Midlands and Wales, sometimes as part of a duo. He learned stagecraft from actors and music hall performers such as Bransby Williams and George Robey. A skilled visual artist, he sometimes appeared as "Baroni the Ambidextrous Cartoonist". He served in the South Staffordshire Regiment during the war, and entertained the troops as "The Trench Philosopher", performing monologues in the style of the character "Old Bill" devised by cartoonist Bruce Bairnsfather.

After the war he continued to perform the act as "Old Bill", with Bairnsfather's endorsement, initially in theatres run by his father in Hertfordshire. On realising that many in his audience did not want to be reminded of the war, he modified the act to become "Old Bill in Civvies", and was sometimes billed as "The Son of Toil". Stephen Dixon writes: "A walrus moustache covered his mouth and a good part of his chin. He dressed like a traditional workman from the 1920s, with a squashed and oil-grimed hat, hobnailed boots, collarless shirt with red handkerchief tied around the throat, moleskin trousers secured just below the knee with string. He would clear his throat and address the audience in a crackly Birmingham whine: 'On behalf of the working classes...'" He often improvised his performance in character, extemporising from the latest newspaper headlines and commenting on political events.

He toured widely, and appeared regularly on BBC Radio in the 1930s, becoming popular with tirades against "the establishment", as well as traditional mother-in-law jokes. He wrote his own material, mostly through observation. He said: "I used to get most of my material in pub tap rooms. I would go into a town when I was on tour and just listen to people’s conversation. Nobody knew me because my character and appearance on and offstage were completely different. I’d listen to people and then I’d twist it a bit." He appeared at Royal Variety Performances in 1933, 1947, and 1954. His performance at the Argyle Theatre in Birkenhead in November 1939 was recorded and issued by Regal Zonophone Records; the theatre was destroyed by bombing shortly after the recording. He also made minor film appearances in Take Off That Hat (1938) and as Hitler in Night Train to Munich (1940).

After the Second World War, Russell's appearances on variety stages became less frequent and he began to appear more as a character actor in films, on television and in the theatre. He appeared in the films The Man in the White Suit (1951) and Judgment Deferred (1952), appeared on television in episodes of The Good Old Days, and toured and recorded in Australia in the mid-1950s. In March 1964 he appeared on ATV's Sunday Night at the London Palladium. He featured in David Kossoff's television sitcom A Little Big Life in 1963, and then in several television series and plays, including United! (1965-66), Cold Comfort Farm (as Adam Lambsbreath, 1968), Dr. Finlay's Casebook (1969), and The Woodlanders (1970). In 1969, he appeared in David Storey's play The Contractor, when he insisted that the other actors rub dirt under their ] for authenticity, and he also appeared in the films Negatives (1968) and I Start Counting (1970).

From the 1930s, he lived at Caversham, Reading, Berkshire. He died in 1971, aged 78, in London, while waiting for his call in a television rehearsal room.
