= Gertrude Denman, Baroness Denman =

British suffragette

The Right Honourable The Lady Denman GBE
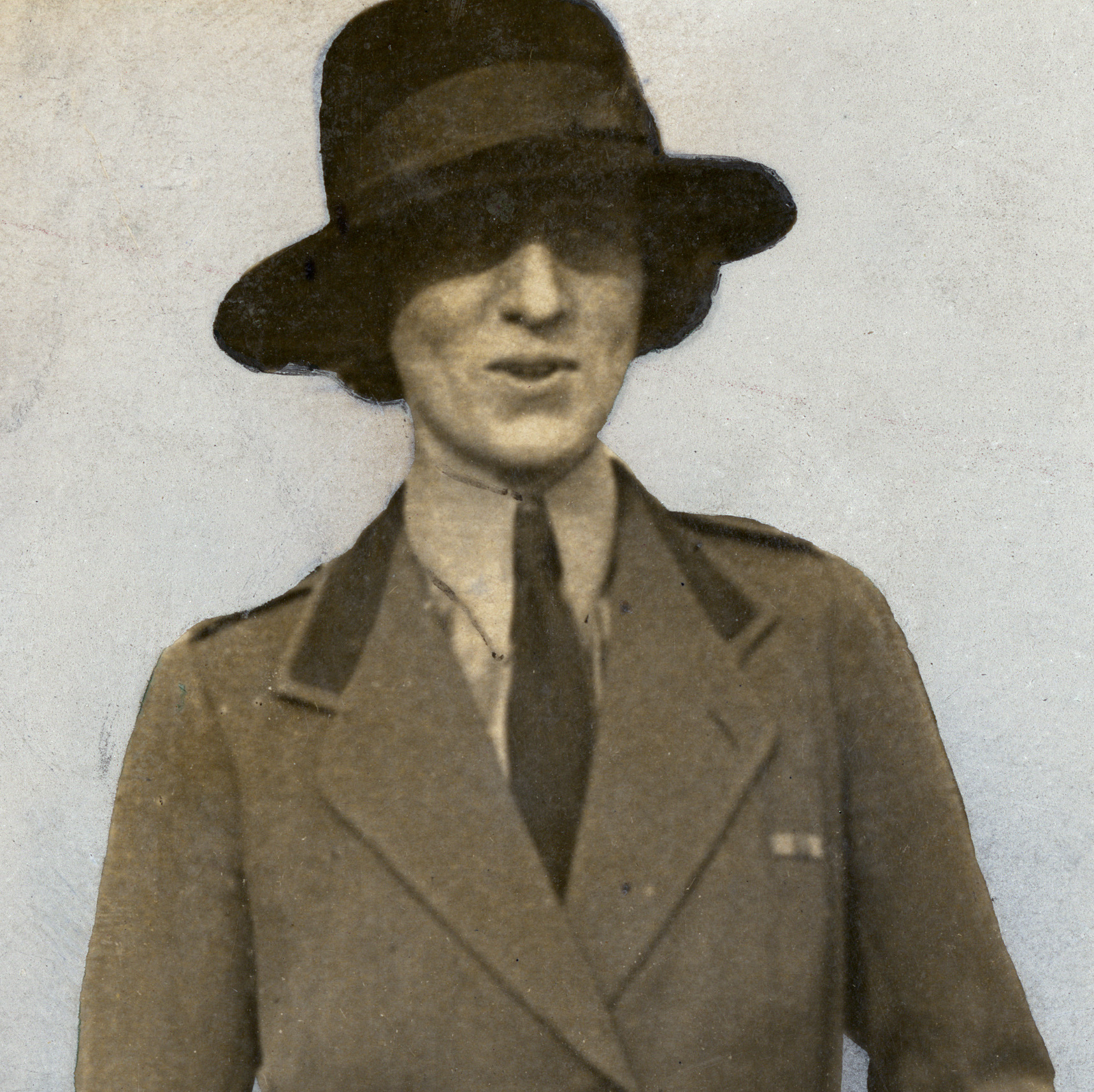
- Denman c. 1925

Spouse of the governor-general of Australia
- In office 31 July 1911 – 18 May 1914
- Monarch: George V
- Governor General: Lord Denman
- Preceded by: Countess of Dudley
- Succeeded by: Helen, Lady Munro Ferguson

Personal details
- Born: Gertrude Mary Pearson; 7 November 1884 Sussex, United Kingdom
- Died: 2 June 1954 (aged 69) London, United Kingdom
- Spouse: Thomas Denman, 3rd Baron Denman (m. 1903; died 1954)
- Children: 2
- Parent(s): Weetman Pearson, 1st Viscount Cowdray (father); Annie Pearson, Viscountess Cowdray (mother)
- Occupation: Female suffragette Vice-regal wife

Gertrude Mary Denman, Baroness Denman GBE (née Pearson; 7 November 1884 – 2 June 1954) was a British women's suffragist and politician. Her husband was Lord Denman, the 3rd Baron Denman, fifth Governor-General of Australia, and she officially named Australia's capital city Canberra in 1913.

== Early life ==
Nicknamed "Trudie", Pearson was the second child, and only daughter, of Weetman Pearson and Annie Pearson (née Cass, later Viscount and Viscountess Cowdray). Her father was a successful businessman, initially in engineering, and later in the development of oilfields in Mexico, the production of munitions for the First World War, building the Sennar Dam on the Nile, as well as coal mining and newspaper publishing.

Pearson's father was a staunch Liberal who supported causes such as free trade, Irish Home Rule and women's suffrage. Her mother was the daughter of a farmer from Bradford, Yorkshire and a feminist who was an active member of the executive of the Women's Liberal Federation. Annie, Viscountess Cowdray, was appointed GBE in 1932.

The Pearson family had just moved to London when Trudie was born; her brother Harold was two years old. Two younger brothers, Clive and Geoffrey, were born in 1887 and 1891, respectively. Due to the worldwide business interests of their father, the Pearson children saw little of their parents and spent their early years in the care of a nanny and a governess. In 1894, when Trudie was ten years old, her father was made a baronet and purchased Paddockhurst, a modern country house and estate in Sussex.

Trudie continued her education in London, both at a day school in Queen's Gate, and later at home in Carlton House Terrace with a series of governesses, while her brothers were educated away from home at boarding school. At the age of sixteen, Trudie completed her formal education at a finishing school in Dresden, Germany.

The poet, broadcaster and socialite Nadja Malacrida was her cousin.

== Marriage ==
In 1902, Trudie met Thomas Denman, 3rd Baron Denman, at a ball in London. A 28-year-old Liberal peer, Lord Denman was the son of a Sussex squire and had inherited his barony from his great-uncle Thomas Aitchison-Denman, 2nd Baron Denman, when he was 20. Denman had been wounded as an officer in the South African War and had returned home and entered political life.

Lord Denman courted the 18-year-old Trudie, who enjoyed his companionship; but when he proposed marriage she initially refused him. Under some pressure from her parents, the courtship continued, and in August 1903 the couple became engaged at Braemar Castle in Aberdeenshire. The couple was married by the Bishop of Chichester on 26 November 1903 at St. Margaret's, Westminster, with Trudie going by the name Lady Denman from then on.

In 1905, Gertrude Denman gave birth to her first child, Thomas. Later that year Sir Weetman bought Trudie her own country estate, Balcombe Place in Sussex which was to become Denman's home for the rest of her life. Her second child, Anne Judith, later to become Lady Burrell, was born at Balcombe Place in 1907. In 1977 the historian, Brian Harrison, interviewed Burrell about her mother as part of the Suffrage Interviews project, titled Oral evidence on the suffragette and suffragist movements: the Brian Harrison interviews.

== Women's suffrage ==
Lady Denman was elected to the Executive of the Women's Liberal Federation in May 1908. Her mother, Lady Pearson had been heavily involved in the organisation for some years, working alongside its President Lady Carlisle, Lady Aberconway and Mrs Mary Broadley Reid. The WLF concentrated on the question of women's suffrage throughout 1908 and into early 1909, but this was put on hold when the People's Budget presented by Lloyd George in April 1909 presented more pressing issues for the Liberals, including the subsequent constitutional crisis which precipitated the general election of January 1910.

With the election over, the Executive of the Women's Liberal Federation were able to turn again to the suffrage question. Denman was active in supporting the Executive's refusal to support Liberal parliamentary candidates who refused to answer the Executive's test questions on suffrage. At the Federation's 1910 Annual meeting, she was re-elected to the Executive with an increased vote and spoke in favour of a resolution to curtail the power of veto held by the House of Lords. By the end of 1910 it was clear that Lady Denman's life was about to change considerably; her husband Lord Denman, was to become the fifth Governor-General of Australia in succession to the Earl of Dudley.

== Australia ==
In 1911 Lord Denman was appointed Governor-General of Australia. The Denmans left London at the end of June and travelled to Marseille from where they set sail for Melbourne, arriving on 31 July. The Denman children arrived later, having been sent via the Cape to avoid the heat of the Red Sea. The Denmans received a favourable welcome despite the tendency of the Australian press to poke fun at the English, and Lord Denman formed a cordial relationship with the Labor Government leader Andrew Fisher and his Attorney-General Billy Hughes.

As well as the large number of official engagements that Lady Denman was required to attend as the wife of the Governor-General, she also found time to take an interest in the National Council of Women of each State. Lady Denman met the councils in all the States and encouraged them at their first interstate conference in 1912 to meet together annually so that all could work toward the same objectives. Another area in which Lady Denman took a particular interest was that of bush nursing. Bush nursing was a service to those living in remote and scattered areas far from doctors and hospital facilities. Lady Denman's predecessor, Lady Dudley, had promoted the idea of a self-supporting scheme in each state and had started raising funds for the project. When Denman arrived in 1911 just one nurse had been appointed; by the end of the year four nurses were at work. In 1912 she opened two new centres and the following year she presided at the Bush Nursing Association's annual meeting. By the time the Denmans left Australia, her interest and support had led to the establishment of almost twenty Bush Nursing Centres in Victoria alone.

Among her other interests were the arts; the Melbourne Repertory Theatre Club, founded by Gregan McMahon, which she supported by attending productions, entertaining the company at Government House, and aiding their efforts to raise funds; she opened the first exhibition of the national Australian Art Association at the Melbourne Athenaeum on 8 May 1913; and Denman also organised an exhibition of old furniture, silver and china at Government House in April 1914. She collected over 500 exhibits, many from her own collections and those of her friend Nellie Melba. The exhibition was a great success with over 20,000 people attending over ten days, and the profits split between the Theatre club and the Arts and Crafts Society.

On 11 March 1913 Lady Denman accompanied her husband and the rest of a Vice-Regal party to the Yass-Canberra district of New South Wales. The following day they were to perform the official opening ceremony of the new capital of Australia. The Minister for Home Affairs, King O'Malley, was determined that a start should be made on the new capital during the Labor government's term of office, and that a formal ceremony should be held, even though the participants would have to camp out in the bush. For some time before the ceremony itself, the name chosen for the new capital had been the subject of some controversy. Many names had been put forward, but the one chosen by the Cabinet was kept secret, even from the Governor-General, until the moment of its announcement.

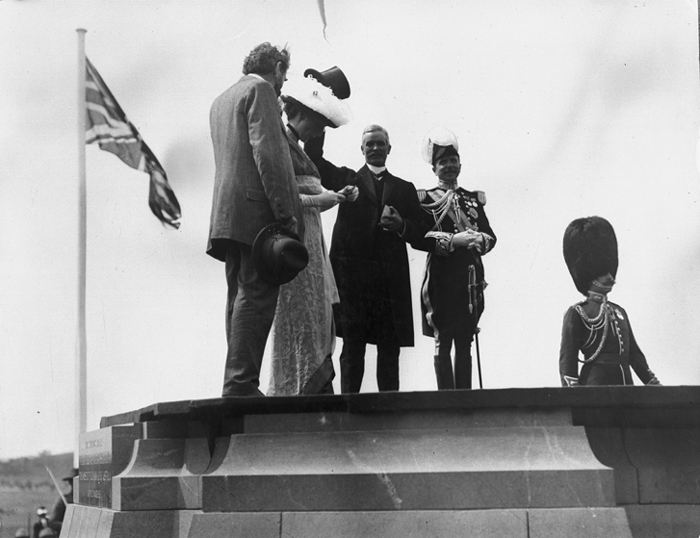
Lady Denman scans the slip of paper on which is written the name of Australia's capital, at a ceremony on 12 March 1913. The name had been kept a close secret until the ceremony. She then announced the name, Canberra. L-R: King O'Malley, Minister for Home Affairs; Prime Minister Andrew Fisher; and Lady Denman's husband, Governor-General Lord Denman

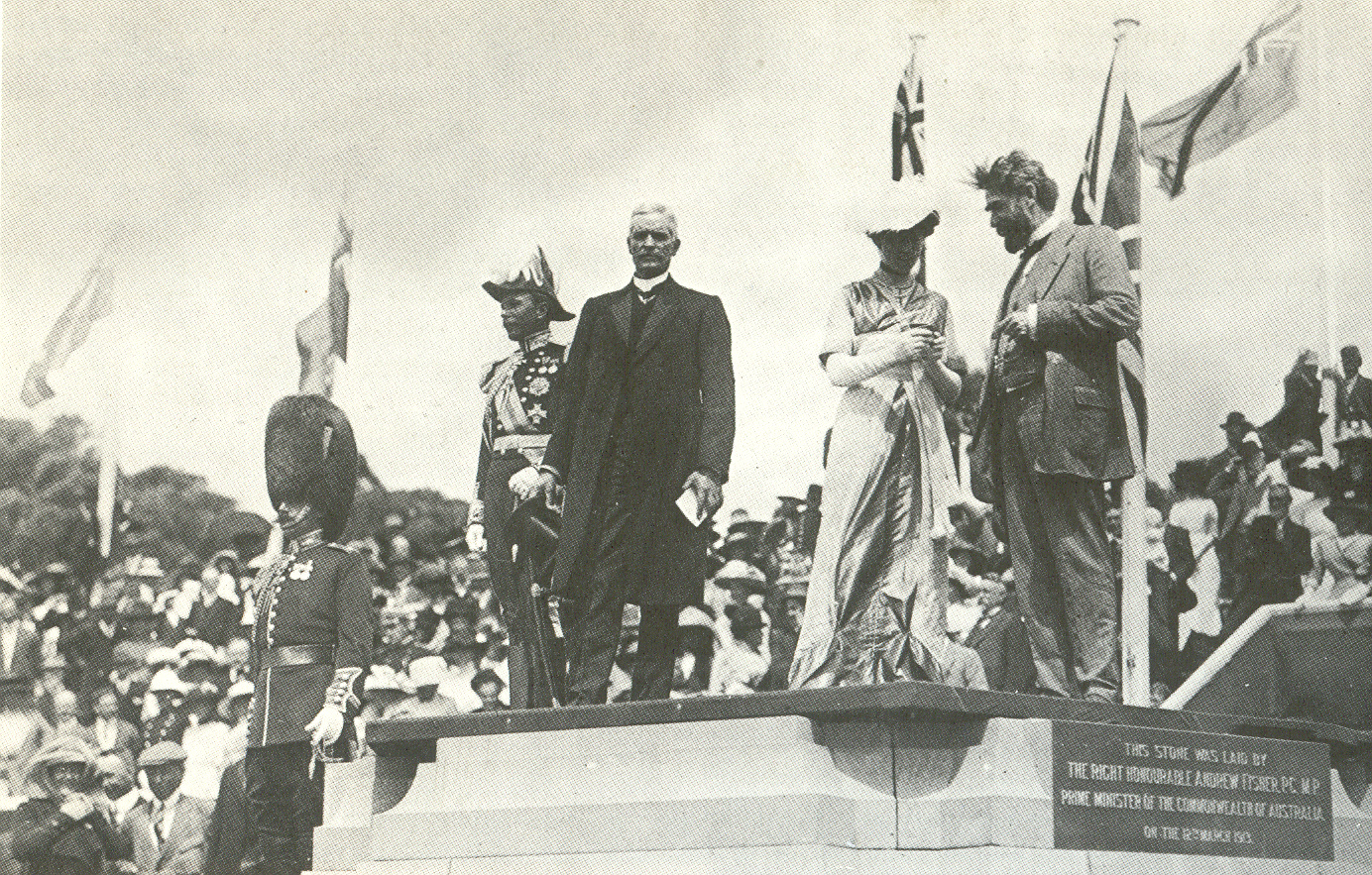
Lady Denman at the ceremony for the naming of Canberra in 1913. From the left; Lord Denman, Governor-General; Andrew Fisher, Prime Minister; Lady Denman; King O'Malley, Minister for Home Affairs

Five hundred official guests and almost 5,000 people travelled in special trains to witness the spectacle. Lord Denman laid the first foundation stone, the Prime Minister and O'Malley laid the second and third stones. The moment had arrived for the naming of the new capital. As well as the choice of name there had been much discussion in the Cabinet as to how the new name should be pronounced. It was decided that whatever pronunciation Lady Denman gave when she read out the name would be the one officially adopted. At noon, Mrs O'Malley presented to Lady Denman a gold case containing a card on which the chosen name was written. Amid a fanfare of trumpets and the bands playing 'All people that on earth do dwell', she made her way to a dais. The music ceased and Lady Denman said, "I name the capital of Australia Canberra." There were loud cheers, and while the artillery fired a twenty-one gun salute, the bands played "Advance Australia Fair" and "God Save the King". The date is now celebrated in the national capital as "Canberra Day".

While Lady Denman and her children accepted life in Australia, and made the most of the opportunities it had to offer, Lord Denman found it uncomfortable and his health was not good. He was frequently in bed with colds and asthma, and his hay fever was especially serious on account of the pollen laden blooms of Australia's national flower, the wattle. Denman had an affair with one of her husband's aides, John Arnold Cuthbert Quilter (1875–1915) during this time. Early in November 1913, Lord Denman announced to the Colonial Secretary Lord Harcourt his desire to resign. Eventually his request was accepted and the Denmans left Australia amid a barrage of laudatory farewell addresses in May 1914.

== World War I ==
As the Denmans returned to Britain in 1914, World War I was about to start. In August, war was declared and Lord Denman took command of a regiment of the County of London (Middlesex) Yeomanry. Lady Denman involved herself with a war charity, Smokes for Wounded Soldiers And Sailors Society. The "SSS" as it was commonly known, had Queen Alexandra as its patron, and an impressive committee with Field-Marshal Lord Grenfell and Admiral Lord Charles Beresford and the wives of other leading admirals and generals among its members. The Society operated from Denman's home at 4 Buckingham Gate, where she had turned the ballroom into a packing centre. The "SSS" voluntary workers met all the hospital trains and ships and supplied all the service hospitals with free smokes. Gertrude Denman became the chairman of the Society in 1916, and by the time she resigned due to other commitments in 1917, some 265 million cigarettes and other smoking materials had been distributed.

While Lady Denman devoted a great deal of her time to the SSS, in private her youngest brother Geoffrey had been one of the first casualties of the war when he was shot trying to escape from his captors during the First Battle of the Marne, and her marriage to Lord Denman continued to bring little happiness to either of them. She enquired into the possibility of divorce but abandoned it when John Quilter died in 1915 fighting in the First World War.

Trudie was delighted by the unexpected return from Kenya of her friend Nellie Grant (mother of Elspeth Huxley). Together they began a scheme to make use of food scraps and save food imports by encouraging the keeping of poultry. This was a popular endeavour, with families, hospitals and other institutions taking part, and resulted in Trudie becoming President of the Women's Section of the Poultry Association.

In the latter part of 1916, Lady Denman accepted the post of chairman of the Women's Institute Sub-Committee of the Agricultural Organisation Society. In 1917, the administration of the expanding Women's Institute movement was transferred to the Women's branch of the Board of Agriculture and Fisheries Food Production Department, which had been set up to form a Women's Land Army. Here she witnessed the organisational skills of Pollie Hirst Simpson, who also served as Assistant Secretary of the Soldiers' and Sailors' Families Association. Denman later invited Simpson to become the Midland Area organiser for the Women's Institute.

== Affiliations ==
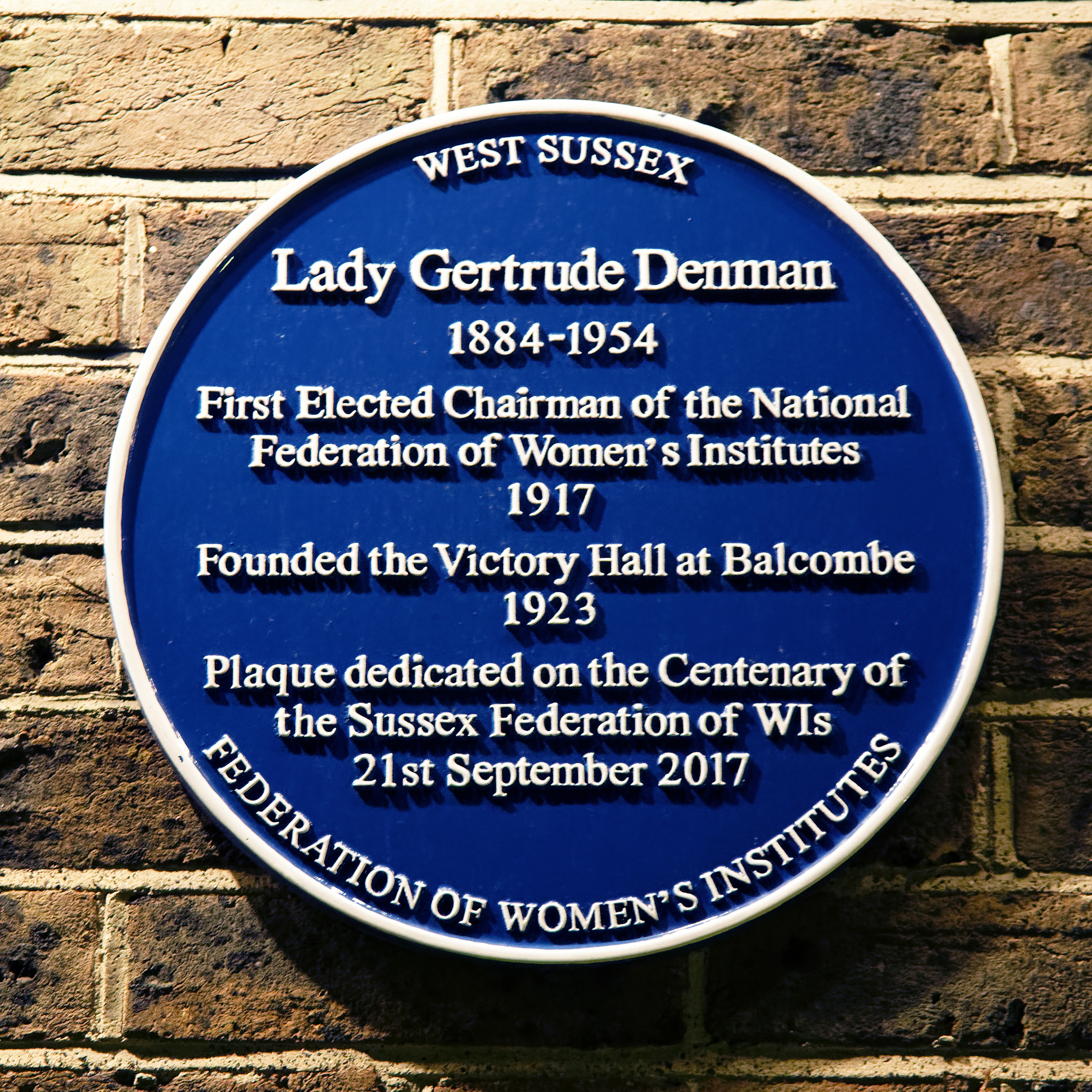
Gertrude Denman plaque at The Victory Hall, which she founded, in Balcombe, West Sussex, where she lived

In 1917, she became the first President of the National Federation of Women's Institutes, a post she held until 1946. She was the first Chair of the Family Planning Association, President of the Ladies Golf Union, a member of the executive committee of the Land Settlement Association, a Trustee of the Carnegie United Kingdom Trust, and a Director of the Westminster Press. In 1933 she was elected Vice President of the Royal College of Nursing, continuing her mother's support for the organisation. She served as one of the Royal College of Nursing representatives on the Cowdray Club, and was Chair of the Council of the Cowdray Club from 1937-1953.

== Women's Land Army ==
During World War II she was Director of the Women's Land Army.

== Damehoods ==
In 1933 Lady Denman was appointed a Dame Commander of the Order of the British Empire (DBE). She was advanced to Dame Grand Cross (GBE) in 1951; her mother, Viscountess Cowdray, had received the same honour in 1932. These entitled her to be known as Dame Gertrude Denman; however, as the wife of a peer, her existing title Lady Denman subsumed this.

== Death ==
Denman died on 2 June 1954, aged 69. Her husband died 22 days later, on 24 June 1954, although they had led almost separate lives for many years.

== Legacy ==
Sydney Ferries Limited named the Lady Denman ferry in her honour in 1911 and was used on Sydney Harbour until 1979. It is now the primary attraction at the Jervis Bay Maritime Museum at Huskisson, New South Wales where it was built. Other naming honours include: Lady Denman Drive, a major arterial road in Canberra and Denman College, the college of the National Federation of Women's Institutes. Denman Prospect, a Canberra suburb, was named in 2012 in honour of Lady Denman and Lord Denman.

== See also ==
- Spouse of the Governor-General of Australia
