= William Stevenson (colonial administrator) =

Governor of Mauritius

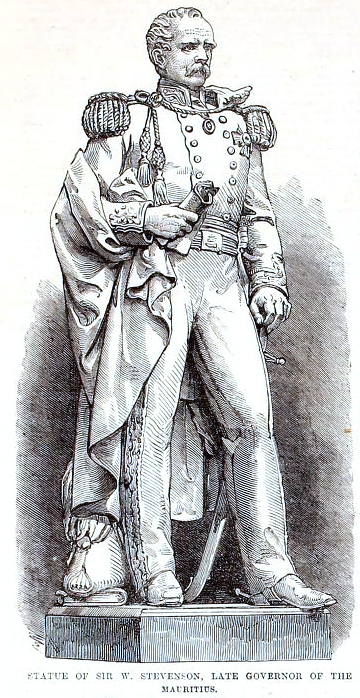
Engraving of the statue of Sir William Stevenson, located in front of Government House, Port Louis, Mauritius.

Sir William Stevenson KCB (1805 – 9 February 1863) was a Jamaican-born British colonial administrator who served as the 9th Governor of Mauritius from 20 September 1857 to 9 January 1863.

He was born to one of the oldest English families on Jamaica. He was the son of William James Stevenson of Kingston. His mother (née James) was descended from Colonel Richard James, who was the first person born of English parents in British Jamaica. Stevenson's grandmother (née Lawrence) was descended from Henry Lawrence, President of Cromwell's Council of State, whose son founded a plantation in Jamaica in the 17th century.

Stevenson was a barrister. He first served as superintendent of British Honduras from 1854–1857 before being appointed Governor of Mauritius in May 1857.

He was invested as a Knight Commander of the Order of the Bath in 1862.

== Family ==
- First marriage: Stevenson – on October 28, 1839, in Saint Catherine Parish, Jamaica – married a Mary Charlotte Allwood (1813–1850). They had a son, William Lawrence Stevenson, and three daughters, one being Kathleen Mary Stevenson (1840–1939) who, on July 18, 1860, married Colonel Sir Francis Marindin (1838–1900).
- Second marriage: Stevenson married again, to Caroline Octavia Biscoe (1819–1908), in 1852, and to them, a son was born, Francis Seymour Stevenson (1862–1938), M.P., Eye. Caroline, after William Stevenson's death, remarried, on May 30, 1865, in London, to Rev. Foster Barham Zincke (1817–1893).

== Death ==
Sir William Stevenson died of dysentery in 1863.

Government offices
Preceded by Sir James Macaulay Higginson	Governor of British Mauritius; 1857–1863	Succeeded by Sir Henry Barkly

== Bibliography ==
=== References ===
- Burke, Bernard (1898). A Genealogical and Heraldic History of the Landed Gentry of Great Britain & Ireland. Harrison & sons. p. 1406.
- London Gazette, The.
1. "No. 22000". The London Gazette. 12 May 1857. p. 1685.
2. "No. 22628". The London Gazette. 23 May 1862. p. 2672.
3. "No. 22647". The London Gazette. 25 July 1862. p. 3707.
- Smart, John Blythe (2005) [1st ed. 2003]. The Wow Factor: How Soccer Evolved Within the Social Web. Freshwater, Isle of Wight: Blythe Smart Publications. LCCN 2005-472886 (2005 2nd ed.); ISBN 0-9545-0172-1, 978-0-9545-0172-3 (2005 2nd ed.); OCLC 58828889 (all editions).
1. Via Internet Archive. Kahle/Austin Foundation (2nd ed.). 2005.
- Times, The (14 March 1863). "Death of Sir William Stevenson". No. 24506. p. 11 (column 6, middle).
1. Via Newspapers.com.
