= Teresa del Riego =

English composer, violinist and pianist

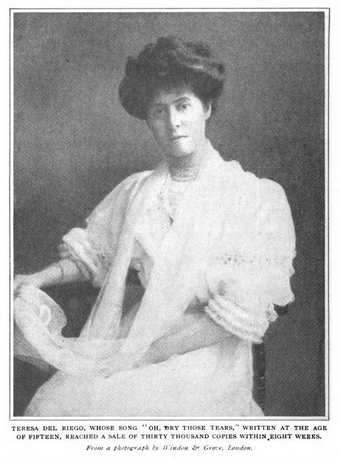
Teresa del Riego, from a 1908 publication.

Teresa Clotilde del Riego, later Teresa Leadbitter (7 April 1876 – 23 January 1968) was an English violinist, pianist, singer and composer of Spanish ancestry.

== Biography ==
Teresa Clotilde del Riego was born in Marylebone, central London to English mother Clara, from Devon, and Spanish father Miguel, a carpenter who had naturalised. She had a sister Agnes Manuela Teresa, a scoutmaster who founded the Women Signallers Territorial Corps, and a brother John Anthony, an actor under the stage name Philip Desborough. The family later moved to Cookham Road, Maidenhead, Berkshire.

Del Riego began playing the piano aged five and wrote her first song at the age of 12. She studied piano, violin, singing and composition at the Convent of the Sacred Heart and the West Central College of Music in London with Sir Paolo Tosti and Marie Withrow, and in Paris. Del Riego was heavily involved in World War I charity concerts. She married her husband, Francis John Graham Leadbitter, in 1908; he died in action in 1917. They had one son. She was a member of the Society of Women Musicians and of the Cowdray Club in Cavendish Square.

Del Riego composed throughout her life, including piano, chamber, and orchestral works, though her best known pieces were songs written in the first decade of the 20th century. She also taught singing and accompanying.

Her principal residence in later life was at 'Sycamore', Mundesley Road, Overstrand in Norfolk. Teresa del Riego died in London at the age of 91 and is buried in the cemetery at Overstrand. Nearby are the graves of her sister Agnes, the first woman scoutmaster and founder of the Women's Territorial Signalling Corps, and her brother, John Anthony del Riego (stage name Philip Desborough).

== Works ==
Del Riego wrote over 300 ballads and sacred pieces which were often performed by the best-known singers of the day, such as Emma Albani, Nellie Melba, Gervase Elwes, Clara Butt and Maggie Teyte. The most popular songs continued to be performed into the 1950s. O Dry Those Tears was first published in 1901 and sold twenty three thousand copies in the following six weeks. The King's Song was first sung by Ben Davies at the Royal Albert Hall Coronation Concert of Edward VII in 1902. Another song, Homing, was performed fifteen times at the Proms between 1918 and 1926. A tribute, 'Sixty Years of Song', was broadcast by the BBC Home Service in April 1954 to mark her 78th birthday.

Her song 'The Awakening', a setting of the poem by Ella Wheeler Wilcox, was first performed in London in January 1911, and was taken up by the suffrage societies, with 1,000 copies printed up to be sold in suffrage shops. It was revived for a BBC radio broadcast in September 2024.

Selected works include:

=== Instrumental compositions ===
- Air in E flat, originally for orchestra, arranged for cello (or violin) and piano (1930)
- In the Wilderness, for orchestra
- Lead Kindly Light, for orchestra (1909)
- Minuet in A, for
- Paquita, for piano (1913)
- A Southern Night, for orchestra
- The Unknown Warrior, for orchestra

=== Vocal compositions ===
- Ave Maria
- The Awakening (1911)
- Birthday Greeting
- The Cherry Tree (with an obbligato for violin or flute, text by A. E. Housman)
- Children's Pictures (song cycle)
- The Green Hills of Ireland (text by Maud Shields; music by Teresa del Riego
- Gloria, song cycle (1906, text by Stephen Coleridge)
- Happy Song (1903, composer's text)
- Harmony
- Homing [links to digitised score] (1917, text by Arthur Leslie Salmon)
- In Exile (c1916, composer's text)
- Invocation for solo voice, chorus and orchestra
- The King's Song (1902)
- O Dry Those Tears (1901)
- Life's Recompense (1914)
- Little Brown Bird (c1912, text by Helen M. Nightingale)
- Little Red Coat
- Love is a Bird
- My Gentle Child
- The reason (c1912, text by Ella Wheeler Wilcox)
- Red Clover
- Sink, Red Sun (c1909, text by Stephen Coleridge)
- Slave Song (1899)
- Spring Gardens
- A Star was His Candle
- Thank God for a Garden, vocal duet (1915, composer's text)
- Three Stuart Songs (1955, text by Radclyffe Hall)
- To Dianeme and To Electra (text by Robert Herrick)

== Recordings ==
- The Green Hills of Ireland ; sung by Richard Crooks; piano accompaniment, Frederick Schauwecker
- Joan Sutherland: Songs My Mother Taught Me, Dame Joan Sutherland, Decca 4833223 (1973)
- In Praise of Woman: 150 Years of English Female Composers, Anthony Rolfe Johnson (tenor), Graham Johnson (piano), Hyperion 5815546 (1994)
- The Golden Age of Brass, Vol.2, Mark Lawrence, American Serenade Band, Summit, ASIN: B0000038IT (1995)
- A Star Was His Candle, Lawrence Tibbett (baritone), Delos (1997)
- Dame Eva Turner - The Collected Recordings, Dame Eva Turner (soprano), La Scala Theatre Orchestra, Pearl, ASIN: B00004C8TK (2000)
- Great Singers: Rosa Ponselle, American Recordings 1939 and 1954, Rosa Ponselle (soprano), Naxos 8.111142 (2008)
- John McCormack Edition, Vol. 8: The Acoustic Recordings (1918-1920), John McCormack (tenor), Naxos 8.112056 (2010)
