= 1906 Eye by-election =

UK Parliamentary by-election

- 6 April 1906

Candidate	Pearson	Graham
Party	Liberal	Conservative
Popular vote	4,568	4,371
Percentage	51.1%	48.9%
MP before election
Francis Stevenson
Liberal
Subsequent MP
Harold Pearson
Liberal

Stevenson

The 1906 Eye by-election was held on 6 April 1906. The by-election was held due to the resignation of the incumbent Liberal MP, Francis Seymour Stevenson. It was won by the Liberal candidate Harold Pearson.

== Result ==
Eye by-election, 1906
Party	Candidate	Votes	%	±%
Liberal	Harold Pearson	4,568	51.1	N/A
Conservative	James Graham	4,371	48.9	New
Majority		197	2.2	N/A
Turnout		8,939	87.9	N/A
Liberal hold		Swing	N/A	
