= Angela Pearson =

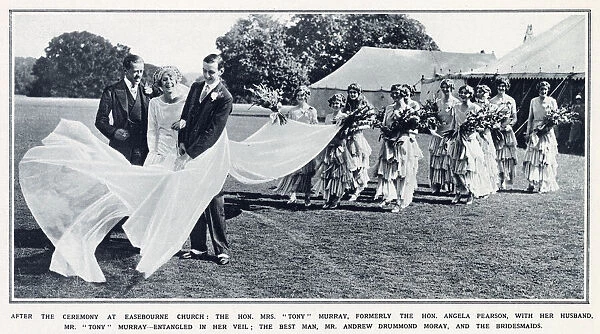
- The Marriage of the honourable Angela Pearson to Tony Murray in 1930
- Born: Angela Pearson; 27 February 1910; Westminster, London, England
- Died: 1981 (aged 70–71); Ardchattan and Muckairn, Scotland
- Occupation: businessperson
- Known for: managing
- Spouses: Lieutenant-Colonel George Anthony (Tony) Murray; Lieutenant-Colonel Robert (Bobby) Modan Thorne Campbell-Preston
- Children: a son and daughter

Hon. Angela Pearson became Angela Murray and Angela Campbell-Preston (27 February 1910 – 1981) was a British businessperson, landowner, and conservationist. She managed her families estates and houses, hospitals and newspapers. She was a supporter of the National Trust for Scotland.

== Life ==
Pearson was born in Whitehall in Westminster in 1910. Her mother was Agnes Beryl Spencer-Churchill (1881–1948) and her father was Harold Pearson, 2nd Viscount Cowdray (1882–1933). Her twin brother was John Pearson, 3rd Viscount Cowdray who at one point was said to be the sixth richest person in the world.

Pearson and her twin brother had three sisters and they were all raised at the family seat of Cowdray Park in West Sussex.

In 1930 she married Lieutenant-Colonel George Anthony (Tony) Murray and in 1933 she became the 23 year old chair of the South London Hospital for Women and Children. Within four years the hospital was opening a new south wing. She led the hospital during the war when an act of parliament was required to allow the hospital to treat men. The hospital was modified as underused spaces were converted into wards for casualties and new operating theatres. Her husband Tony was killed in Italy in 1945. Their only child to survive childhood became, in 1957, Iain Murray, 10th Duke of Atholl.

After the war she was a widow and she led the Lambeth group of hospitals for the newly formed National Health Service. In 1950 she married Lieutenant-Colonel Robert (Bobby) Modan Thorne Campbell-Preston and moved to his home, Ardchattan Priory, by Loch Etive in Argyllshire. Their daughter, Sarah, was born in 1951. She moved her focus from hospitals to the huge family business which included publishing. She joined the board of the Pearson company in 1953 and she was appointed chair of their Westminster Press which owned a number of British regional newspaper titles. She supported each of them in delivering local news to various cities like Oxford and Brighton and the readers of the Northern Echo.

Pearson had helped to manage Blair Castle in Perthshire since the 1930s when her grandmother had invested in the estate. She had lived there from 1945 when she became a widow. She had then supervised the appointment of a new management throughout the estate to bring it back into profitability. She had donated houses on the estate to the National Trust for Scotland after the war and she enjoying refurbishing small houses. In 1960 she gave he expertise as a member of the board of the National Trust for Scotland and in 1967 she led a working party for the King's Fund which looked at the optimum design of a standard hospital bedstead.

== Death and legacy ==
Pearson died in Ardchattan and Muckairn in 1981 survived by her husband. She had sat the year before for a painting by Bryan Organ. This painting is in the collection of Blair Castle where in 2023 her daughter, Sarah Troughton, was the chief trustee.
