= Charles Anthony Pearson =

The Honourable Charles Anthony Pearson
- Born: 5 March 1956
- Occupations: Landowner; Businessman
- Known for: Major Scottish Landowner and owner of Dunecht estate
- Spouse: Baroness Benedicte Blixen-Finecke
- Children: 2
- Parent(s): John Pearson, 3rd Viscount Cowdray; Elizabeth Mather-Jackson

The Hon. Charles Pearson (born 5 March 1956) is the younger son of the 3rd Viscount Cowdray and owner of Dunecht estate in Aberdeenshire.

== Early life and education ==
Charles Pearson is the younger son of the Third Viscount Cowdray and his wife Elizabeth (née Mather-Jackson) daughter of Sir Anthony Mather-Jackson, 6th Baronet. Charles Pearson was educated at Harrow School.

== Marriage and Family ==
In 1992 Charles Pearson married Baroness Benedicte Blixen-Finecke, daughter of Ifver Iuul. They have two children Carinthia (b 1993) and George (b 1995) and live in West Sussex and in Aberdeenshire.

== Business ==
Charles Pearson is a Director of The Dickinson Trust Ltd, The Cowdray Estate Trust Ltd and the Cabardunn Development Company Ltd.

He is the principal partner in the Dunecht Home Farms Partnership, a farming business operating over 3,000 acres (12 km^{2}) in Aberdeenshire. Enterprises on the farm include cereals, oilseed rape, beef cattle and sheep.

Charles Pearson and his immediate family are owners of Dunecht Estates, a diverse rural property based in Aberdeenshire and Kincardineshire. Dunecht Estates extends to 53,000 acres (210 km^{2}) and comprises seven estates – Dunecht Estate, Ramoir and Campfield Estate, Dunnottar Castle, Forest of Birse, Edinglassie Estate, West Durris Estate and Bucharn Estate. Interests on the Estates include farming, forestry, field sports, minerals, let houses, commercial property, tourism and development land. Dunecht House, the Category A listed building that is the centre piece of the Dunecht estate, was sold to the Scottish business entrepreneur Jamie Oag in 2012.

== Interests ==
Charles Pearson is President of the West Sussex Association for Disabled People. His leisure interests include shooting, fishing, walking and riding.

In 2009 Pearson and his family won a twelve-year battle against the Ramblers Association and West Sussex County Council to move rights of way at Pitshill House, Tillington, West Sussex which will allow restoration of this important Grade II* listed building and its surrounding listed parkland.
