= Gillian Raine =

British actress and singer (1926–2016)

- Born: Gillian Mary Lorraine; 28 December 1926; Colombo, Ceylon
- Died: 19 June 2018 (aged 91); London, England
- Occupations: Actress, singer
- Years active: 1946–2012
- Spouse: Leonard Rossiter (m. 1972; died 1984)
- Children: 1

Gillian Mary Lorraine (28 December 1926 – 19 June 2018), known professionally as Gillian Raine, was a British actress and singer. She was married to actor Leonard Rossiter from 1972 until his death in 1984; they had one daughter.

Raine appeared in repertory theatre, TV drama and film productions. Her theatre works included Hedda Gabler (as Juliana Tesman), 2005, at The Duke of York's Theatre, Richard Eyre's production of La Grande Magia for the National Theatre, Mike Bradwell's Mackerel Sky at the Bush Theatre and Bill Bryden’s production of A Month in the Country at the Yvonne Arnaud Theatre and in the West End at the Albery Theatre. Film work included Darling and A Night to Remember and on television Kiss Me Kate, Vanity Fair, A Very Peculiar Practice and Under the Hammer. She met Rossiter when they were both appearing in the play Semi-Detached in 1962 at the Belgrade Theatre, Coventry.

Leonard's marriage to Josephine Tewson had ended in 1961. During the play's second run at the Belgrade, in September 1963, Leonard and Gillian fell in love and started to live together, although they did not marry until 1972. Semi-Detached subsequently played briefly on Broadway in October 1963. She played the part of Phyllis Bennett in the 1987 TV Series, The Charmer starring Nigel Havers, and appeared as Harriet Longthorn in New Tricks (S5:E3, "A Face for Radio," 2008). She died in 2018 at the age of 91.

== Filmography ==
Year	Title	Role	Notes
1958	A Night to Remember	Passenger	Uncredited
1968	Last of the Long-haired Boys	Mara Trigg	
1974	Who Killed Lamb?	Miss Bennett	
2012	The Hour	Mrs. Goldman	(final appearance)
