= Cowdray Club =

The British Cowdray Club (originally known as The Nation's Nurses and Professional Women's Club) was founded in 1922 by Annie Pearson, Viscountess Cowdray and founding members of the Royal College of Nursing. The membership was to be made up of 55% nurses, 35% professional women, and 10% "suitable women".

The Club was based at 20 Cavendish Square, London, and remained in existence until 1974, when it merged with the Naval and Military Club in Piccadilly.

== History ==
The creation of the Cowdray Club is closely linked to the beginnings of the Royal College of Nursing, and both organisations shared a building through the duration of the Club's existence at 20 Cavendish Square. The previous owner of the building was H. H. Asquith. The freehold for 20 Cavendish Square was acquired for the club in 1920 after Rachael Cox-Davies shared a taxi journey with Lady Cowdray, in which time she lobbied for Cowdray to purchase the 'old Asquith house'. Lady Cowdray bought the freehold to the property for £20,000.

The Club was opened in June 1922 with 650 members. By the end of July that year the number had risen to 2000. By May 1923, membership was 3045. In this time the club held and provided 53,076 lunches, 25,705 teas and 17,910 dinners. The Westminster Gazette of 20 June 1922 reported that in the club were several themed rooms, including a 'French Room', a 'Writing Room', 'Silence Room' and 'Recreation Room'. In 1924 the club hosted a dinner for all eight women members of parliament, including the very first female MP, Lady Astor.

According to one source, around 1926 the club's cream and brown colored dining room held three marble plaques. One was dedicated to Florence Nightingale, likely as she was a celebrated nurse and social reformer who helped professionalise the nursing profession, partly by establishing the first secular nursing school at St. Thomas's Hospital in London, and one was dedicated to Edith Cavell, as she was a celebrated English nurse and to some extent a martyr to the English cause in WWI. The third plaque was dedicated to the club's founder Annie Pearson, likely for her role in helping to establish the Royal College of Nursing, and possibly to honour her efforts as a philanthropist and social reformer who served as honorary treasurer for the Liberal Women's Suffrage Union, and was instrumental in making old age pensions available for certain English citizens.

The popular name for the Club, "Cowdray", originates from the First Viscountess Cowdray, Annie Pearson, who was regarded as the "fairy Godmother of the nursing profession". Lady Cowdray wished for the club to provide "a centre for intercourse and recreation and which should also furnish some of those creature comforts which we associate with the word 'home'". Lady Cowdray often brought things for the Club from her own home "to place in positions where she felt they would be 'just right', and she took pleasure in deciding on and choosing furnishings.

Many of the club's papers are now held at the London Metropolitan Archives, including minutes of meetings, pamphlets, scrapbooks of news-clippings that mention the club, and guestbooks which feature the signatures of health ministers, the Queen of Sweden and many of the founding members of the Royal College of Nursing.

== Members ==
- Mary Frances Billington, English journalist and writer.
- Lady Violet Bonham Carter, close political ally of Winston Churchill.
- Gertrude Denman, Baroness Denman, active in women's rights issues, chairman of the Cowdray Club, 1937-1953.
- Canadian healthcare pioneer Eunice Henrietta Dyke used the club in 1923, staying for a month as part of her tour as a consultant on public health nursing.
- Rose Heilbron, British judge.
- Valerie Hobson, British actress.
- Amy Johnson, British aviator, first female pilot to fly solo from England to Australia in 1930. A 1938 portrait of Johnson by Cowan Dobson still hangs in the Naval and Military Club.
- Ballad composer Teresa del Riego listed the club as her London address in the 1935 and 1950 editions of Who's Who in Music.
- Mary Snell Rundle, British nursing reformer.
- Josephine Tey used the Cowdray as her London base, and many of the characters in her novels take their names from fellow members. Nicola Upson researched club records, and found a Grant, an Ashby, a Blair, a Farrar and a Marion Sharpe among the members.
- Dame Ninette de Valois, classical ballet dancer, teacher and choreographer, founder of the Royal Ballet.
