= Bob Russell (British politician) =

British politician

Sir Bob Russell
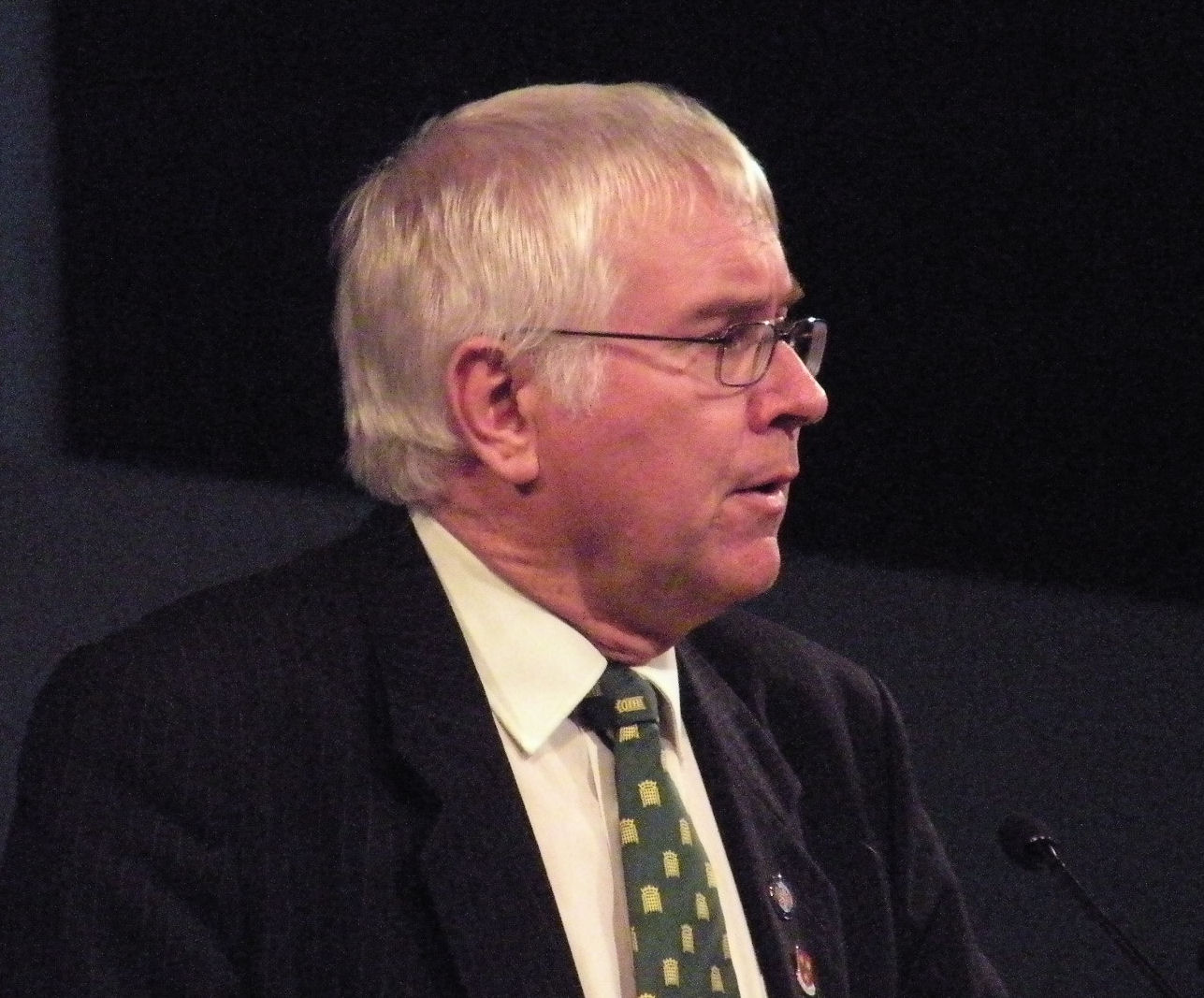

High Steward of Colchester
- Incumbent
- Assumed office 30 June 2015
- Monarch: Elizabeth II
- Preceded by: Sir Ivor Crewe

Member of Parliament for Colchester
- In office 1 May 1997 – 30 March 2015
- Preceded by: Constituency created
- Succeeded by: Will Quince
- Majority: 6,982 (15.1%)

Personal details
- Born: 31 March 1946 (age 80) London, England
- Party: Liberal Democrat (1988–present)
- Other political affiliations: Labour (1971–81); SDP (1981–88)

Sir Robert Edward Russell (born 31 March 1946) is a former Liberal Democrat politician in the United Kingdom who was the Member of Parliament for Colchester from 1997 to 2015. He was first elected at the 1997 United Kingdom general election and won subsequent re-election in 2001, 2005 and 2010; he was defeated in the 2015 United Kingdom general election by the Conservative candidate Will Quince.

Russell was knighted for public service in the 2012 New Year Honours. He holds the ceremonial position of High Steward of Colchester.

== Career ==
Prior to his first election to the House of Commons, Russell was a councillor representing New Town ward continuously from 1978 to 2002. He was originally elected as a Labour Party candidate before defecting to the Social Democratic Party in 1981, and then standing as a Liberal Democrat candidate from 1988 onwards. He held a dual mandate of Member of Parliament and councillor from 1997 to 2002.

He was leader of Colchester Borough Council until 1991, having previously served as Mayor of Colchester for the year 1986–87.

Prior to standing as parliamentary candidate for the Liberal Democrats, Russell stood unsuccessfully for Parliament for Colchester in 1979 as a Labour candidate.

Russell was the Liberal Democrats' spokesman on Culture, Media and Sport from 2002 to 2005, when he was replaced by Don Foster. He was a member of the Liberal Democrat Shadow Defence team until the formation of the Conservative – Liberal Democrat Coalition Government on 11 May 2010, at which point he became a backbencher.

At the 2010 general election Russell's majority was 6,982 votes (15.1%). In 2011, Russell was a member of the special Select Committee set up to scrutinise the Armed Forces Bill which was passed.

During his period in parliament, Russell was a member of the Beveridge Group, vice-chair of the All Party Parliamentary Flag Group and sat on the Defence Select Committee.

Following his defeat at the 2015 general election, he was appointed the High Steward of Colchester (also known as High Sheriff of Colchester), a position he currently holds. He stood at the 2017 general election as the Liberal Democrat candidate for his former seat, finishing in third place.

=== Causes ===
Russell is known for supporting unusual causes, such as petitioning the House of Commons for the return of Young's bitter to the Strangers' Bar. He spoke out against celebrity tax exiles, including Lewis Hamilton. He campaigned against the 1996 sale of Ministry of Defence housing to Annington Homes and for soldiers' housing to be improved.

=== Controversy ===
In December 2010, a reply that Russell wrote to a constituent who was concerned about the cost of the upcoming Royal Wedding of Prince William and Catherine Middleton was published. In it, Russell told the constituent to "get a life and stop whinging". In 2011, he followed this up with a contentious letter to a member of the public who had asked whether he would lend support to Colchester's new Visual Arts Facility (later to become Firstsite). Referring to alleged implications that he did not support the arts as "Rubbish[,] man!", Russell accused those in support of Firstsite as "expecting the council to fund their social life".

Russell caused further controversy in February 2012, when another letter he had written to a constituent appeared in the press. Russell responded to the constituent's query as to what would happen if sufficient funds for a new Royal yacht could not be raised by stating, “Are you serious? Don’t you have more important things in your life to be worried about without bothering me with this?"

=== Expenses ===
In 2012, Russell was found to have broken parliamentary expenses rules after claiming more than £70,000 over seven years for an office owned by a company in which he was a major shareholder. He was found to have acted in good faith, but was found to be in "clear breach" of the rules. Russell apologised, stating: "I have not personally made a financial gain from the arrangements. Rather I have made a significant personal contribution to provide an office which is fit for purpose at no additional cost to the public purse."

== Other interests ==
Russell is a former season ticket holder for Colchester United football club, and wrote the foreword for a history of the club.

== Sources ==
- LibDem website biography
- LibDem Shadow Ministerial Team
- www.publicwhip.org.uk

Parliament of the United Kingdom
New constituency	Member of Parliament for Colchester; 1997– 2015	Succeeded by Will Quince
