= Peregrine Pearson =

British aristocrat (born 1994)

The Honourable Peregrine Pearson
- Born: Peregrine John Dickinson Pearson; 27 October 1994 (age 31); United Kingdom
- Education: University of West London
- Parents: Michael Pearson, 4th Viscount Cowdray (father); Marina Rose Cordle (mother)

Peregrine John Dickinson Pearson (born 27 October 1994) is a British aristocrat and son of Michael Pearson, 4th Viscount Cowdray.

Pearson is the eldest son of Michael Pearson, 4th Viscount Cowdray, and his second wife, Marina, née Cordle. Marina is the second daughter of John Cordle, a Conservative Member of Parliament. He has three older sisters and a younger brother. Pearson has a degree in business, management, and marketing from the University of West London. Pearson works as the director of a property development company in London. He is an ambassador of Lafuma, a footwear company. From 2020 to 2023, he was in a relationship with Princess Maria-Olympia of Greece and Denmark, granddaughter of Constantine II of Greece and Anne-Marie of Denmark, who were the last King and Queen of the Hellenes.
