= Harold Pearson, 2nd Viscount Cowdray =

British peer and politician

The Right Honourable The Viscount Cowdray DL

Member of Parliament for Eye
- In office 6 April 1906 – 25 November 1918
- Preceded by: Francis Seymour Stevenson
- Succeeded by: Alexander Lyle-Samuel

Personal details
- Born: 18 April 1882
- Died: 5 October 1933 (aged 51)
- Party: Liberal Party
- Spouse: Agnes Beryl Spencer-Churchill (m. 1905)
- Children: 6, including Weetman Pearson, 3rd Viscount Cowdray
- Parent(s): Weetman Pearson, 1st Viscount Cowdray; Annie Cass

Weetman Harold Miller Pearson, 2nd Viscount Cowdray, DL (18 April 1882 – 5 October 1933), styled The Honourable Harold Pearson between 1910 and 1927, was a British peer and Liberal Party politician.

== Background ==
Cowdray was the son of Weetman Dickinson Pearson, 1st Viscount Cowdray, and his wife Annie, daughter of Sir John Cass.

== Political career ==
Cowdray was elected as Member of Parliament for Eye at a by-election April 1906, and held the seat until the 1918 general election, which he did not contest. In 1927 he succeeded his father in the viscountcy and entered the House of Lords. He was also a major in the Sussex Yeomanry and a Deputy Lieutenant of Sussex. He was the Chairman of the Hurlingham Club Polo Committee until his death.

== Polo ==
He learnt to play polo at Oxford University and his love of the sport resulted in the grounds being laid out at Cowdray House in 1910. Chukkas started in April, although most competitions coincided with the festival of racing at nearby Goodwood in late July - the principal cup being the Cowdray Park Challenge Cup, still played for today. When Harold acquired the estate in 1919, he renamed his 'Capron House' team (named after his former residence) to 'Cowdray Park' accordingly. The yellow of their team shirts was their signature colour to match the Liberal Party, which he and his father supported.

== Family ==
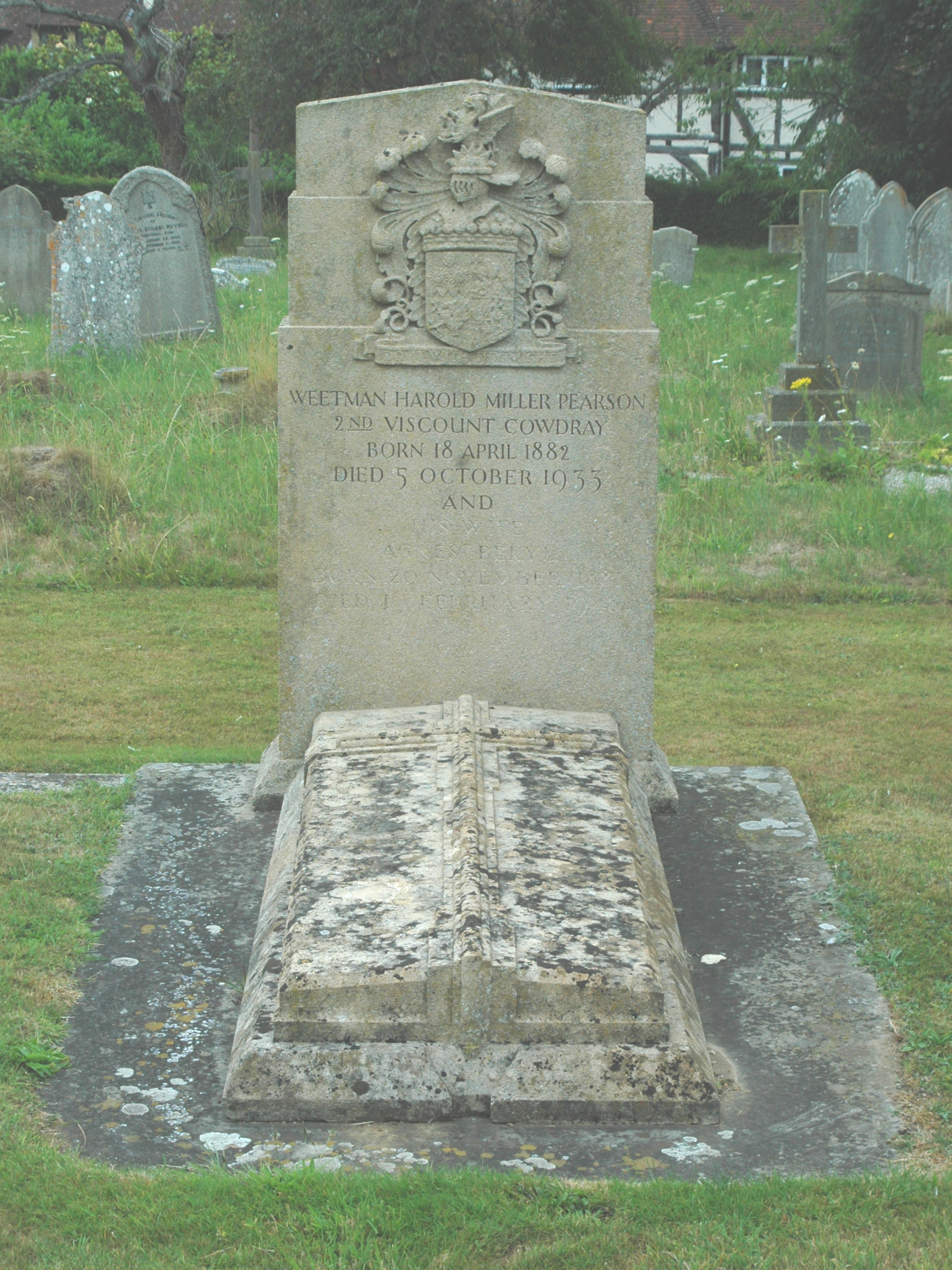
Harold Pearson's grave at St. Mary's parish church, Easebourne, West Sussex

Lord Cowdray married Agnes Beryl, daughter of Lord Edward Spencer-Churchill, in 1905. They had one son and five daughters who included Angela Pearson. He died in October 1933, aged 51, and was succeeded by his only son, Weetman. Lady Cowdray died in February 1948, aged 66.

Parliament of the United Kingdom
Preceded by Francis Seymour Stevenson	Member of Parliament for Eye; 1906–1918	Succeeded by Alexander Lyle-Samuel
Peerage of the United Kingdom
Preceded by Weetman Dickinson Pearson	Viscount Cowdray; 1927–1933	Succeeded by Weetman John Churchill Pearson
