= Jamie Oag =

Scottish entrepreneur (born 1966)

James George Oag is a Scottish business entrepreneur.

== Education ==
Oag was born in West Lothian in March 1966. He attended Armadale Academy then served an apprenticeship as a mechanic before attending Inverness College to study mechanical engineering. Further qualifications were achieved at the Robert Gordon University in Aberdeen and he gained a Master of Science degree in Instrument Analytical Science from the School of Applied Sciences in 1992.

== Career ==
After completing his education, Oag spent seven years working as a Field Engineer with Halliburton, leaving the firm to found his own company, Optima Solutions in 1999. By February 2008 Optima had a staff of more than fifty employees and a 55 per cent share of the company was sold to Northern Industries for an eight figure sum. Later that year Oag took delivery of a Bugatti Veyron. The £810,000 vehicle was purchased as an investment but sold a few years later as Oag said "it wasn't helpful when meeting clients." Oag has gained several industry awards and Optima Solutions was awarded the Queen's Awards for Enterprise in 2009 in the category for International Trade.

In mid 2010, Oag purchased a £1 million share of SPEX, another Aberdeen company, which had been founded in 2009. Oag retained a shareholding in SPEX and assumed the role of Chief Executive of the company in January 2014.

Optima was purchased by the American company Tetra Technologies in March 2012 for over £40 million. At that time Oag had a 42.3 per cent stake in the company.

Re-development of ideas gleaned from out of date patents has served Oag as an inspiration for innovative designs such as remote controls for domestic fire alarms.

== Personal life ==
Dunecht House, a Category A listed building in Aberdeenshire, was purchased from Charles Anthony Pearson at the end of 2012 for £1.2 million. Oag married Yulia Sarycheva, a Russian business student, in a ceremony at the mansion's chapel during November 2012.
