= Francis Seymour Stevenson =

British politician

Francis Seymour Stevenson

Francis Seymour Stevenson (24 November 1862 – 9 April 1938) was a British Liberal Party politician, author and scholar. He was elected at the 1885 general election as Member of Parliament (MP) for Eye in Suffolk, and held the seat until his resignation from the House of Commons on 19 March 1906 (after that year's general election) by becoming Steward of the Manor of Northstead.

== Life ==
Stevenson resided at Playford Mount, Suffolk, and at 5 Ennismore Gardens, London. He was born in British Mauritius, where his father, William Stevenson, was Governor, and baptized at Moka, Mauritius. He was educated at Lausanne, Harrow, and at Balliol College, Oxford where he matriculated on 29 January 1881 at age 18. He was an Exhibitioner from 1879 to 1884 (Honors: 2 Classical Mods. 1882, and 1st class Literary Humanities 1884) with Bachelor of Arts 1884 and was a student of Lincoln's Inn in 1883.

In Suffolk, Stevenson served as J.P and D.L, as well as M.P. for their Eye Division from 1885. He served as President of the Anglo-Armenian Association from 1892 and on the Civil List Committee in 1901. He was Parliamentary Charity Commissioner for England and Wales from 1894 to 1895. He also served as County Alderman for East Suffolk and was Knight Commander of the Greek Order of the Redeemer.

Stevenson scholarly works include Parish Councils (1892); Historic Personality (1893); The Case for the Armenians (1893); Life of Robert Grosseteste, Bishop of Lincoln (1899); Poems: In Various Moods for Various Ages (1911); A History of Montenegro (1912); November Sunsets: And Other Poems (1919); and Conflict and Quest (1926).

Parliament of the United Kingdom
| Preceded by Ellis Ashmead-Bartlett | Member of Parliament for Eye; 1885 – 1906 | Succeeded by Weetman Pearson |
Church of England titles
| Preceded by Sir Lees Knowles | Second Church Estates Commissioner; 1906 | Succeeded by Charles Hobhouse |
