= Cowdray Park, Gauteng =

Cowdray Park
- Location within Gauteng Location within South Africa
- Coordinates: 26°03′30″S 27°59′23″E
- Country: South Africa
- Province: Gauteng
- Municipality: City of Johannesburg

Area
  - Total: 0.36 km^{2} (0.14 sq mi)

Population (2001)
  - Total: 487
  - Density: 1,400/km^{2} (3,500/sq mi)
- Time zone: UTC+2 (SAST)
- PO box: 2060

Cowdray Park is a suburb of Johannesburg, South Africa. It is located in Region B of the City of Johannesburg Metropolitan Municipality.
