= Peter Everett (author) =

British novelist and author

Peter Everett (1 June 1931, in Hull, England – 2 December 1999) was an English novelist and author. He was born in Hull, East Riding of Yorkshire, and educated at the local grammar school. He began writing at the age of nineteen. His work appeared in Encounter and Botteghe Oscure. He also wrote scripts for the BBC Third Programme and was awarded an ATV prize for a play produced on Granada Television. His first novel Negatives won the 1965 Somerset Maugham Award. Everett had written the book in a mere three weeks.
