= Cowdray Park, West Sussex =

Country house in Midhurst, England

Coordinates: 50.98724°N 0.71619°W

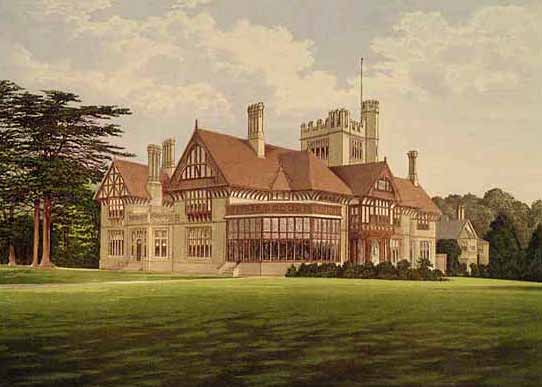
A picture of Cowdray Park published in 1880.

The park lies near Easebourne, West Sussex, in the South Downs National Park. The estate belongs to Viscount Cowdray, whose family have owned it since 1909. It has a golf course, and it offers clay pigeon shooting and corporate activity days, as well as the more traditional activities of agriculture, forestry and property lets.

The preserved ruins of Cowdray House an important Tudor era great house lie in the park and are open to visitors.

== History ==
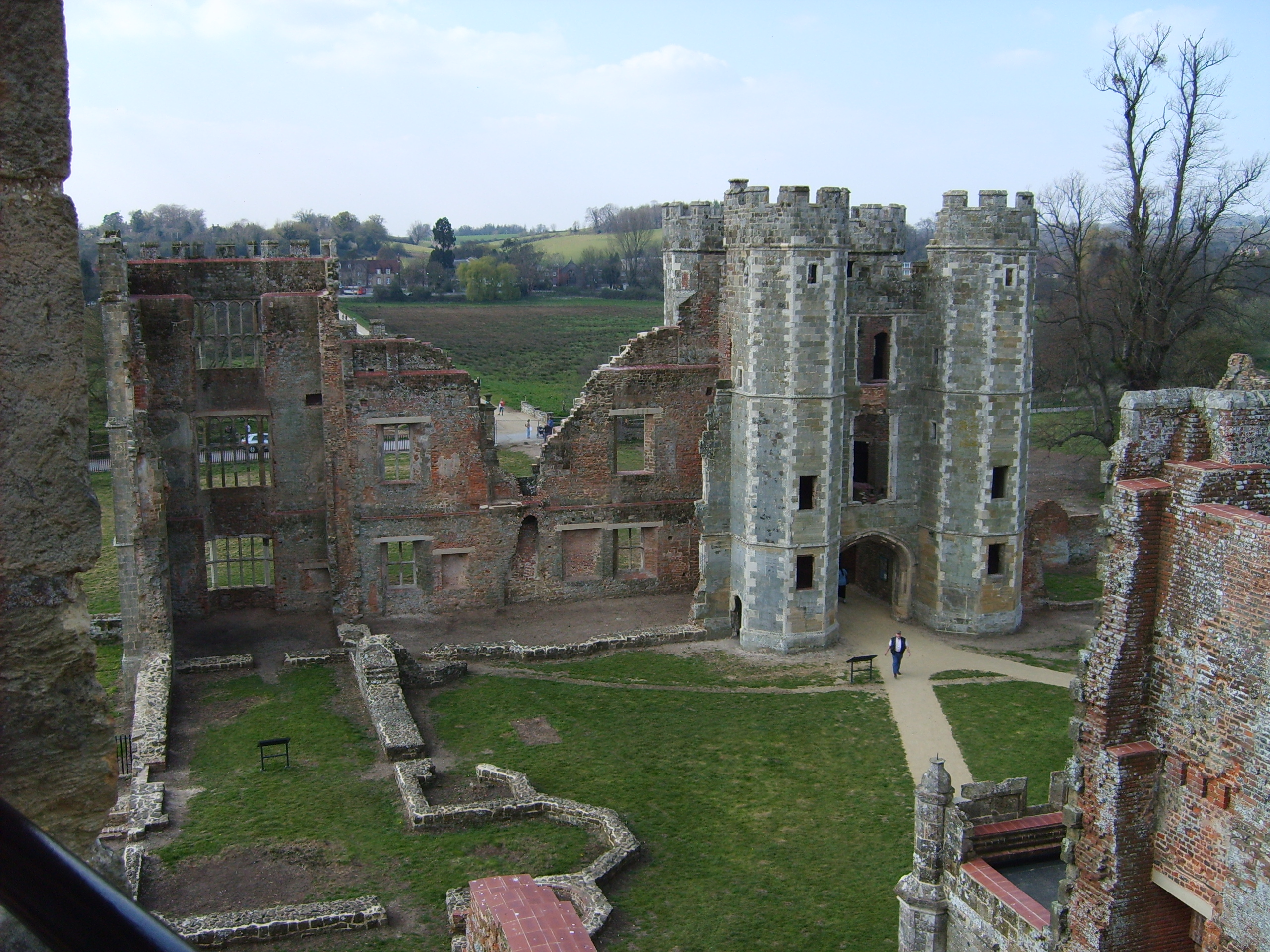
Ruins of Cowdray House

The estate was owned by the Bohun family from approximately 1185. Sir David Owen built Cowdray House in the 16th century. His son sold the estate to William FitzWilliam, 1st Earl of Southampton in 1529. His half-brother Sir Anthony Browne inherited the estate in 1542. Browne's son Anthony Browne, 1st Viscount Montagu inherited in 1548. The 7th Viscount employed Capability Brown to landscape the park in 1770. The park and gardens are Grade II* listed. On 25 September 1793, a fire destroyed Cowdray House, reducing it to its present ruined state. The ruins are Grade I listed.

The 7th Viscount's daughter married William Stephen Poyntz. On his death in 1840, the estate was purchased by George Perceval, 6th Earl of Egmont. The present house was built by his son Charles Perceval, 7th Earl of Egmont in the 1870s. It was purchased in 1909 by Weetman Pearson, later 1st Viscount Cowdray, who restored the house. His heir and his twin Angela Pearson were born in 1910 and they and their three sisters were brought up here. His heir made further alterations in 1927.

During the Second World War it was occupied by the Royal Army Service Corps. After the war, architect Percy Wheeler made alterations for John Pearson, 3rd Viscount Cowdray. The house was refurbished by Michael Pearson, 4th Viscount Cowdray from 1995. It is Grade II listed. Numerous other aspects of the estate are listed.

In 2005 the Heritage Lottery Fund awarded a grant of £2.7m towards the cost of stabilising the ruins and they were opened to the public on 31 March 2007. In May 2009 Lord Cowdray sought to turn the house into a country house hotel, but the project was abandoned when Cowdray failed to find a business partner. Cowdray moved to another family property at Fernhurst. The following year, in September 2010, the house was put on the market for £25 million, not including the rest of the estate. Lord Cowdray, claimed that he did not want his son to inherit the burden of maintaining the house.

The collection housed within Cowdray Park was auctioned in situ by Christie's over three days, between 13 and 15 September 2011. Among the objects sold were furniture, silver, paintings, tapestries and porcelain, with a portrait previously identified as Queen Elizabeth I (but now considered more likely to be Catherine Howard, née Carey, Countess of Nottingham) achieving the highest auction price of £325,250. In total, the auction raised £7.9 million.

== Cowdray Park Polo Club ==
The estate is home to the Cowdray Park Polo Club, which describes itself as the "Home of British Polo". The club was founded in 1910. The Cowdray Gold Cup tournament was inaugurated in 1956.
