= Viscount Cowdray =

Title in the Peerage of the United Kingdom

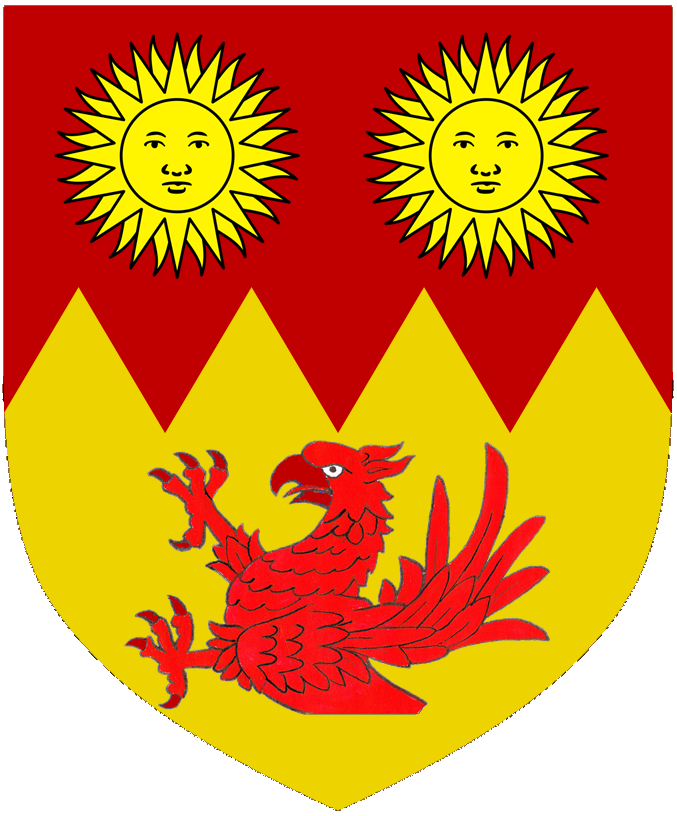
- Escutcheon of the Viscounts Cowdray
- Creation date: 3 January 1917; 109 years ago
- Created by: George V
- Peerage: Peerage of the United Kingdom
- First holder: Weetman Pearson, 1st Viscount Cowdray
- Present holder: Michael Pearson, 4th Viscount Cowdray
- Heir apparent: Peregrine Pearson
- Status: Extant
- Seat: Cowdray Park
- Motto: Do it with thy might

Viscount Cowdray, of Cowdray in the County of Sussex, is a title in the Peerage of the United Kingdom. It was created in 1917 for the industrialist Weetman Pearson, 1st Baron Cowdray, head of the Pearson conglomerate. He had already been created a Baronet, of Paddockhurst, in the Parish of Worth, in the County of Sussex, and of Airlie Gardens, in the Parish of St Mary Abbots, Kensington, in the County of London, on 26 June 1894, and Baron Cowdray, of Midhurst in the County of Sussex, in 1910. His son, the second Viscount, sat as a Liberal Member of Parliament for Eye. His son, the third Viscount, after serving in World War II where he lost an arm, was Chairman of the family firm of Pearson Plc from 1954 to 1977. The titles are held by the latter's son, the fourth Viscount, who succeeded in 1995.

The family seat is Cowdray Park, West Sussex, near Midhurst, Sussex, which the 4th Viscount put up for sale in 2011 and later proposed converting into apartments.

== Viscounts Cowdray (1917) ==
- Weetman Dickinson Pearson, 1st Viscount Cowdray (1856–1927)
- (Weetman) Harold Miller Pearson, 2nd Viscount Cowdray (1882–1933)
- Weetman John Churchill Pearson, 3rd Viscount Cowdray (1910–1995)
- Michael Orlando Weetman Pearson, 4th Viscount Cowdray (born 1944)

The heir apparent is the present holder's son Hon. Peregrine John Dickinson Pearson (born 1994).

Baronetage of the United Kingdom
Preceded by Glen-Coats baronets	Pearson baronets of Paddockhurst and Airlie Gardens; 26 June 1894	Succeeded by Austin baronets
