= Weetman Pearson, 1st Viscount Cowdray =

British politician

The Right Honourable The Viscount Cowdray GCVO PC
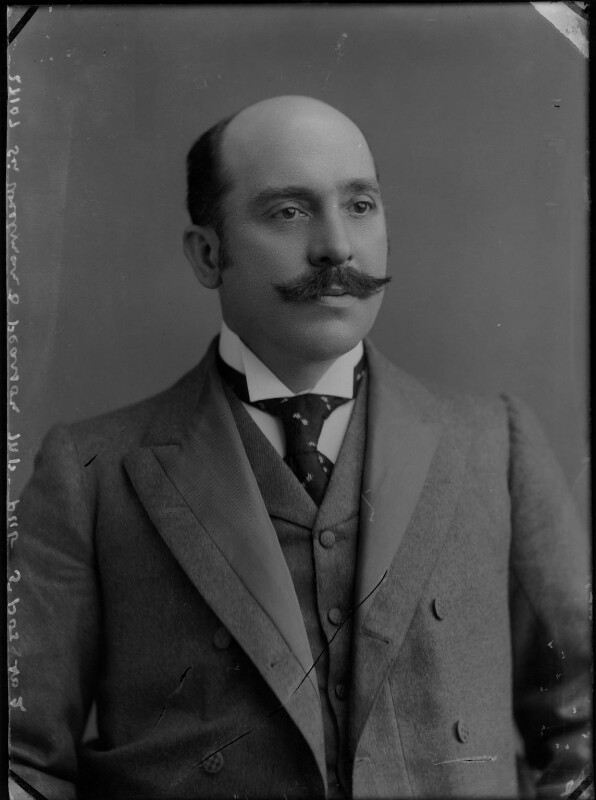

President of the Air Board
- In office 3 January 1917 – 26 November 1917
- Monarch: George V
- Prime Minister: David Lloyd George
- Preceded by: The Earl Curzon of Kedleston
- Succeeded by: The Lord Rothermere

Personal details
- Born: Weetman Dickinson Pearson; 15 July 1856 Shelley, Kirkburton, West Yorkshire, England
- Died: 1 May 1927 (aged 70) Dunecht House, Aberdeenshire, Scotland
- Party: Liberal
- Spouse: Annie Cass
- Children: Harold Pearson, 2nd Viscount Cowdray; Bernard Clive Pearson; Francis Geoffrey Pearson; Gertrude Denman, Baroness Denman
- Occupation: engineer, building contractor, politician
- Known for: engineering projects, oil companies, MP Colchester, philanthropy

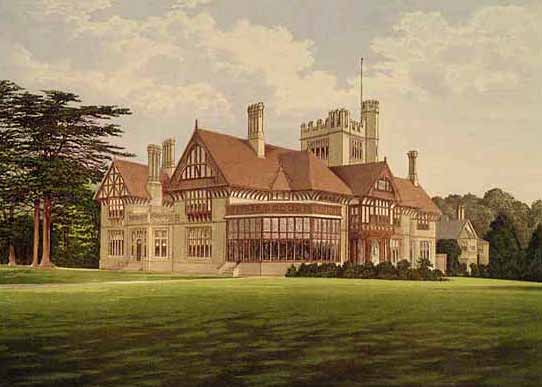
Cowdray Park, West Sussex, seat of 1st Viscount Cowdray. Purchased by him in 1909, house built in the 1870s by Charles Perceval, 7th Earl of Egmont

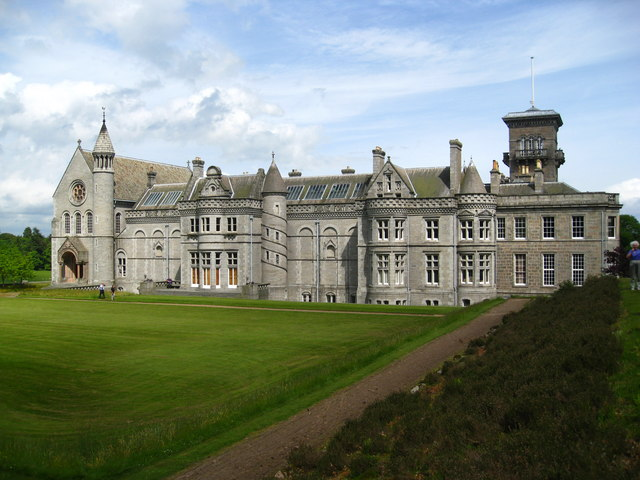
Dunecht House, Aberdeen, Scotland, a residence of 1st Viscount Cowdray and place of his death. Leased by him in 1907, purchased 1912. Built 19th century and extended 1912-20 by Pearson

Weetman Dickinson Pearson, 1st Viscount Cowdray, GCVO, PC (15 July 1856 – 1 May 1927), known as Sir Weetman Pearson, Bt between 1894 and 1910, and as Lord Cowdray between 1910 and 1917, was an English engineer, oil industrialist, benefactor and Liberal politician. He was the owner of the Pearson conglomerate.

== Background ==
Pearson was born on 15 July 1856 at Shelley, Kirkburton, West Yorkshire, the son of George Pearson (died 1899), owner of the manufacturing and contracting firm S. Pearson & Son, by his wife, Sarah Dickinson, a daughter of Weetman Dickinson, of High Hoyland, South Yorkshire.

== Business career ==
The family construction business S. Pearson & Son was founded in 1844 by his grandfather Samuel Pearson (1814–1884). Weetman Pearson took over the company in 1880 and later moved the headquarters from Yorkshire to London. An early proponent of globalization, S. Pearson & Son built the Admiralty Harbour at Dover, docks in Halifax, tunnels, railways and harbours around the world, and the Sennar Dam in Sudan.

In 1900, the company took over the construction of the Great Northern and City Railway in London and after completion in 1904 ran it for four years. In 1907 he established an investment company, Whitehall Securities Corporation Ltd which, under the direction of his son Clive Pearson, played an important role in the development of British airlines in the 1930s.

Today Pearson Plc is mainly engaged in the business of publishing.

=== Mexican Eagle Petroleum Company ===
In 1889, Porfirio Díaz, the President of Mexico, invited Pearson to his country to build a railroad—the Tehuantepec Railway—from the Atlantic to the Pacific Ocean. On one of Pearson's trips to Mexico, he missed a rail connection in Laredo, Texas, and was obliged to spend the night in the town which he described as "wild with the oil craze" from the recent discovery of oil at Spindletop. After doing some quick research that night about oil seepages in Mexico, Pearson began acquiring prospective oil lands in Laredo, thinking he could use discovered oil to fuel the Tehuantepec Railway he was building.

In 1902, after sulphur was found in the Isthmus of Tehuantepec, Pearson used a Texas drilling crew to drill Potrerillos, a rise of ground close to his railway. Well No. 4 confirmed the location of a salt dome at a depth of 709 feet. This was a good sign, since oil was found at Spindletop in 1901, alongside the edge of a salt dome. Well No 8 became Mexico's first commercial oil well. Pearson then brought in Anthony Lucas to help spot 20 drilling locations, developing areas at Jáltipan, Capacan, Tecuanapa, and Soledad. In 1908, Eagle built Mexico's first oil refinery, located at Minatitlán. In 1910, Potrero del Llano No. 4, came in as a real gusher. In 1921, Pearson added Mexican Eagle Petroleum Company (Cia. Mexicana de Petroleo el Aguila, S.A.) to the Shell-Royal Dutch merger.

In 1911, President Diaz was overthrown and the Mexican Revolution began. The associated violence and turmoil had a negative effect on foreign investors in Mexico's oil industry. In October 1918 Pearson sold a substantial portion of Mexican Eagle stock to Calouste Gulbenkian, on behalf of Royal Dutch Shell, which took over its management.

== Political career ==
Pearson was created a Baronet, of Paddockhurst, in the Parish of Worth, in the County of Sussex, and of Airlie Gardens, in the Parish of St Mary Abbots, Kensington, in the County of London, in 1894. He was first elected Liberal Member of Parliament for Colchester at a by-election in February 1895. He held the seat at the 1895 general election and retained it until 1910 when he was raised to the peerage as Baron Cowdray, of Midhurst in the County of Sussex. His time is connected with a number of developments, most notably the opening of Colchester Castle to the public. Under his leadership during World War I, the munitions factory HM Factory, Gretna and the tank assembly at Chateauroux were built.

In January 1917, he was sworn of the Privy Council and made Viscount Cowdray, of Cowdray in the County of Sussex. That same month, David Lloyd George requested that he become President of the Air Board. Cowdray agreed, provided that he receive no salary. Lord Cowdray worked diligently to improve the output of aircraft and produced a threefold increase in the number of aircraft under his tenure. Yet he was criticized after German bombing produced over 600 casualties on 13 June, and resigned the following November.

Following the war, he was active in Liberal politics and in philanthropic activities. He endowed a professorship in the Spanish department at the University of Leeds, and contributed to University College London, the League of Nations Union, the Royal Air Force Club and Memorial Fund, and to many public projects.

== Marriage and children ==
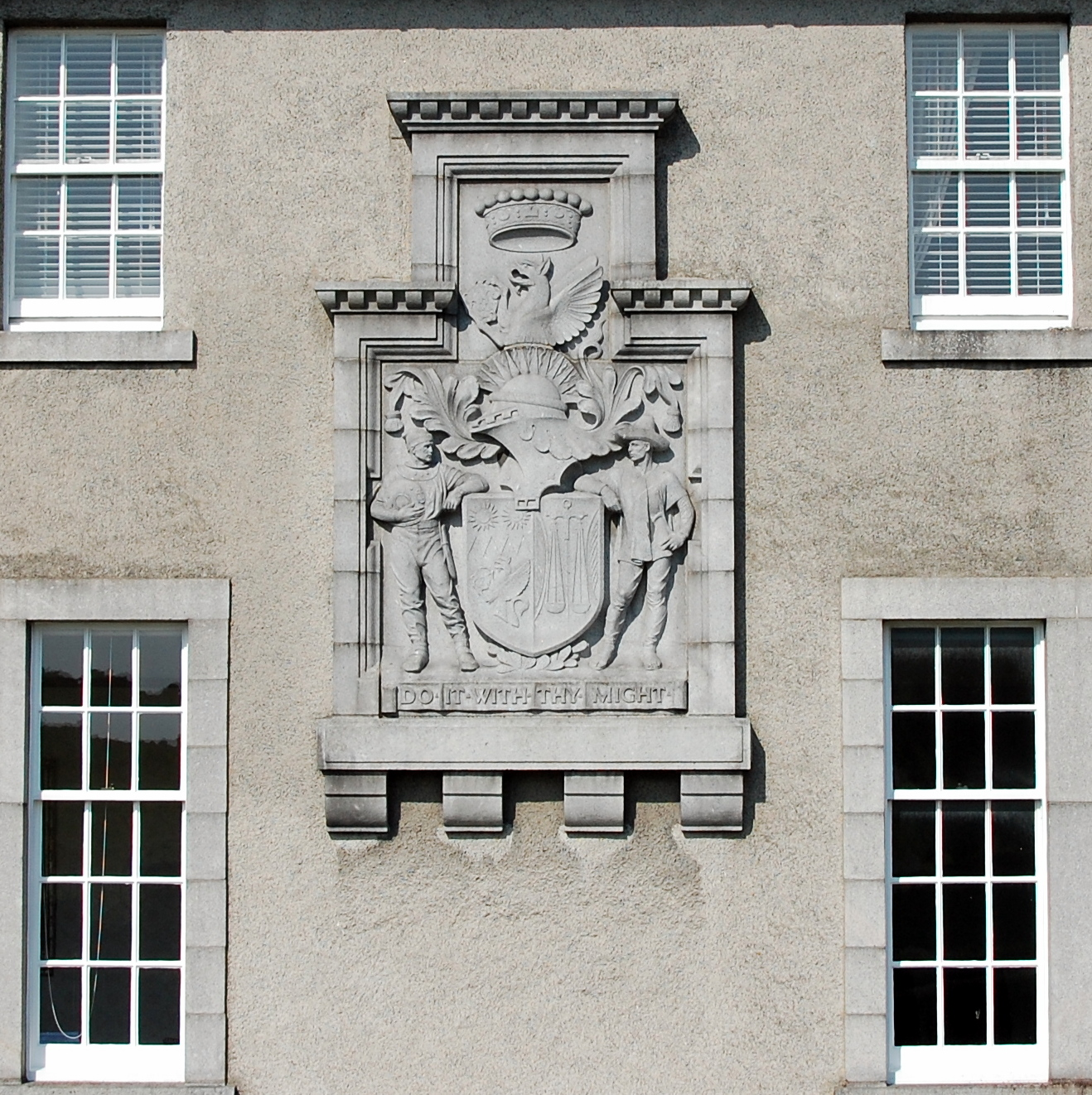
Arms of the 1st Viscount Cowdray, facade of Dunecht House

Lord Cowdray married Annie Cass, a daughter of Sir John Cass (1832–1898), of Bradford in Yorkshire, merchant and landowner, Justice of the Peace and Chairman of the Bradford Conservative Association, whose inscribed gravestone survives in Undercliffe Cemetery, Bradford. By his wife he had four children:

- Weetman Harold Miller Pearson, 2nd Viscount Cowdray
- Hon. Bernard Clive Pearson (12 August 1887 – 22 July 1965), who on 14 October 1915 married Hon. Alicia Mary Dorothea Knatchbull-Hugessen, daughter of Edward Knatchbull-Hugessen, 1st Baron Brabourne. They had three daughters.
- Hon. Francis Geoffrey Pearson (23 August 1891 – 6 September 1914), who on 6 August 1909 married Ethel Elizabeth Lewis, daughter of John J. Lewis, of Hove, Sussex. In August 1914, at the start of World War I, he joined the Motor Transport Division of the British Expeditionary Force as a motorcycle courier, with the rank of Staff Sergeant. Early in September as the Allied Armies were rolled back toward the River Marne during the German drive on Paris, he was captured near the town of Varreddes, and died on 6 September 1914 at age 23. He was buried at the Montreuil-aux-Lions British Cemetery. Reports surfaced later that he had been treated with unconscionable brutality by his captors, which directly caused his death. Great indignation was raised by these reports, one of many that were flooding out of Northern France at the time. The incident was referenced by Arthur Conan Doyle in his 1914 book "The German War" (Chapter VI, 'A Policy of Murder'), who called him "the gallant motor-cyclist, Pearson".
- Gertrude Mary Pearson (Gertrude Mary, Baroness Denman, GBE), who married Thomas Denman, 3rd Baron Denman, Governor-General of Australia.

The poet, broadcaster and socialite Nadja Malacrida was his niece.

== Death ==
Lord Cowdray died in his sleep at Dunecht House, Aberdeenshire on 1 May 1927, aged 70, leaving a fortune of £4m, but instead of following primogeniture it was evenly divided into 10 parts. He was succeeded by his eldest son Weetman Harold Miller Pearson, 2nd Viscount Cowdray.

== Arms ==
Coat of arms of Weetman Pearson, 1st Viscount Cowdray
Crest In front of a Demi Gryphon Gules holding between its claws a Millstone proper thereon Mill-Rind Sable a Sun in Splendour Escutcheon Per fess indented Gules and Or in chief two Suns in Splendour and in base a Demi-Gryphon couped all counterchanged Supporters Dexter: a Diver holding in his exterior hand his Helmet all proper; Sinister: a Mexican peon also proper Motto Do It With Thy Might

Parliament of the United Kingdom
Preceded by Sir Herbert Naylor-Leyland, Bt	Member of Parliament for Colchester; 1895–1910	Succeeded by Sir Laming Worthington-Evans, Bt
Political offices
Preceded by The Earl Curzon of Kedleston	President of the Air Board; January–November 1917	Succeeded by The Lord Rothermere as President of the Air Council
Academic offices
Preceded by Winston Churchill	Rector of the University of Aberdeen; 1918–1921	Succeeded by Sir Robert Horne
Peerage of the United Kingdom
New creation	Viscount Cowdray; 1917–1927	Succeeded by Weetman Harold Miller Pearson
New creation	Baron Cowdray; 1910–1927	Succeeded by Weetman Harold Miller Pearson
Baronetage of the United Kingdom
New creation	Baronet (of Paddockhurst and Airlie Gardens); 1894–1927	Succeeded by Weetman Harold Miller Pearson
