= Gawdy =

Gawdy may refer to:

- Bassingbourne Gawdy (died 1590), English member of parliament
- Bassingbourne Gawdy (died 1606) (1560–1606), English member of parliament
- Anthony Gawdy (died 1606), English member of parliament
- Framlingham Gawdy (1589–1654), English member of parliament
- Francis Gawdy (died 1605), English judge
- Henry Gawdy (c. 1553 – 1621), English member of parliament
- Philip Gawdy (1562-1617), English member of parliament
- Thomas Gawdy (died 1588), English lawyer and member of parliament
- Thomas Gawdy (died 1556), English member of parliament
- William Gawdy (1612–1669), 1st Baronet of the Gawdy baronets of West Harling (1663), English politician
- Gawdy baronets, either of two baronetcies created in the 17th century; both became extinct in the early 18th century
