= Thomas Bedingfield (MP for Eye) =

Member of the Parliament of England

Thomas Bedingfield (c. 1554 – 1635 or 1636) was an English lawyer and politician who sat in the House of Commons in 1586.

Bedingfield was the son of Thomas Bedingfield of Fleming’s Hall, Bedingfield, Suffolk and his wife Mary Methwold, daughter of William Methwold of Langford, Norfolk. He succeeded to the family estate on the death of his father in 1571. He matriculated from Christ's College, Cambridge in May 1571. He entered Furnival's Inn and was then admitted at Lincoln's Inn on 27 January 1575. In 1583 he was called to the bar and was a J.P. for Suffolk from 1584.

In 1586, Bedingfield was elected Member of Parliament for Eye. He was a pensioner of Lincoln's Inn from 1597 and was an associate of the bench in 1603. From April 1604 he was steward of duchy of Lancaster lands in Norfolk, Suffolk and Cambridgeshire.

Bedingfield bought an estate at Darsham from Edward Honing. He died between 28 September 1635 when he made his will and 26 November 1636 when it was proved. At the time of his death he was living at Darsham where he was buried.

Bedingfield married Dorothy Southwell, daughter of John Southwell of Barham, Suffolk and had three daughters and five sons including Philip who inherited the estate, Thomas who was a judge and Anthony.

Parliament of England
| Preceded by Bassingbourne Gawdy; George Brooke | Member of Parliament for Eye; 1586; With: Bartholomew Kemp | Succeeded by Edward Grimston; Sir Edmund Bacon |
