= Henry Bokenham =

English politician (c.1575 – 1638)

Sir Henry Bokenham (c.1575 – October 1638) was an English politician.

== Biography ==
Bokenham was the eldest son of Edmund Bokenham of Thelnetham, Suffolk and Mary Wiseman. He was educated at Emmanuel College, Cambridge, graduating in 1591. On 21 July 1601, he married Dorothy Walsingham. He was knighted on 23 October 1603, by which time he was recorded as a gentleman pensioner.

In 1604, Bokenham was elected as a Member of Parliament for Eye. He represented the seat for the duration of the parliament, until 1611. He made no recorded speeches and was appointed to only two committees. In 1612, Bokenham's father was imprisoned for debt and Bokenham himself was persuaded to spend some time overseas to avoid association with the case. By 1626, he had returned to England and the family fortunes had recovered sufficiently to be appointed a justice of the peace for Suffolk. In 1630 he served a term as High Sheriff of Suffolk.

Parliament of England
Preceded by Edward Honnyng; Anthony Gawdy	Member of Parliament for Eye; 1604–1611; With: Edward Honnyng (1604–1610); Sir John Kay (1610–1611)	Succeeded by Sir Robert Drury; Huntingdon Colby
