= Charles Cutler (disambiguation) =

Charles Cutler (1918–2006) was an Australian politician.

Charles Cutler may also refer to:

- Charles Cutler (English MP)
- Charles R. Cutler (1936–2020), American engineer
- Charles Cutler (wrestler) (1884–1952), American professional wrestler
