= John Kay (MP) =

Sir John Kay (July 1568 – 1624), of Hackney, Middlesex and the Tower of London, was an English Member of Parliament (MP) and gentleman of the Privy Chamber.

He was a Member of the Parliament of England for Eye 7 February 1610.

Parliament of England
Preceded by Edward Honnyng; Henry Bockenham	Member of Parliament for Eye; With: Henry Bockenham	Succeeded by Robert Drury; Huntingdon Colby
