= Thomas Gawdy =

Thomas Gawdy may refer to:

- Thomas Gawdy (died 1588), English barrister and judge, also member of parliament for Arundel and Norwich
- Thomas Gawdy (died 1556), English barrister and Recorder, at various times also a member of parliament for Norwich, Lynn, and Salisbury.
