= Nightingall =

Nightingall is a surname. Notable people with the surname include:

- Ken Nightingall (1928–2020), British sound engineer
- Miles Nightingall (1768–1829), British Army officer
- Walter Nightingall (1895–1968), British racehorse trainer
