= Bassingbourn (disambiguation) =

Bassingbourn is a village in Cambridgeshire, England.

Bassingbourn may also refer to:

- RAF Bassingbourn, a former airfield in Cambridgeshire, England
- Bassingbourn Barracks, an army base on the site of the airfield

== See also ==
- Bassingbourne Gawdy (disambiguation)
