= John Clench =

English judge

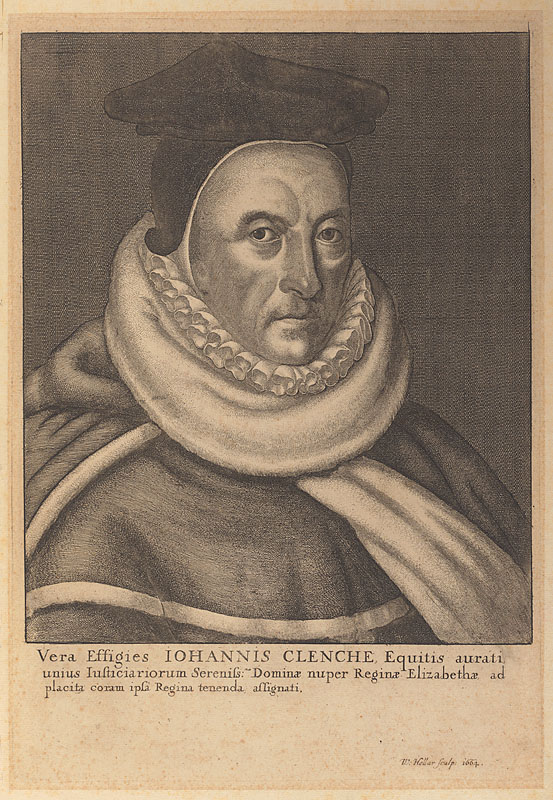
John Clench by Wenceslaus Hollar

John Clench (c. 1535 - 1607) was an English judge, a Serjeant-at-Law, Baron of the Exchequer and Justice of the Queen's Bench, of the late Tudor period. He established his family in south-east Suffolk, in the neighbourhood of Ipswich, where for many years he was the Town Recorder.

== Life ==
=== The path to distinction ===
Clench was the son of John Clench of Wethersfield, Essex and Joan, daughter of John Amias of the same county, and grandson of John Clench of Leeds, Yorkshire. He was admitted a student at Lincoln's Inn on 11 February 1555/56, and was chamber-fellow with Thomas Weekes, 'a learned gospeller', in 1558-59.

Walter Copinger relates that, when young, Clench was steward of the manors of Henry Crane (died 1586, of Chilton, near Sudbury, Suffolk). For his good services, Crane gave him the lease of an estate at Crowfield, Suffolk, for £100 less than its annual value, upon condition that he did not assign it elsewhere. Accordingly Clench resided at Crowfield. His eldest son Thomas was born around 1557, so he was by that time married to Katheryn, daughter of Thomas Almott of Creeting All Saints (one of the manors in the Creetings parishes of St Mary and St Peter), a little north from Ipswich beside the river Gipping. Almott had acquired that manor after 1560 from the Jermy family, and it passed into the Clench family by this union. In 1565 Clench raised a fine on the manor against John Almott. There were to be thirteen children.

John Clench, Reader at Furnival's Inn in 1566, was continued to 1568 to supply the invalid election of his successor: his readings concerning testamentary matters survive in manuscript. Called to the bar in 1568, he became bencher in 1570 following the expulsion of several members for failure to conform to religious statutes, whereupon he had "auncientye of all men, and the best studdye". He was elected Reader at Lincoln's Inn in Lent 1574, Keeper of the Black Book in 1576-1577, and Treasurer of Lincoln's Inn in 1578-1579. In 1573/74 he was appointed Recorder of Ipswich, the county town of Suffolk, as a freeman to solicit the town's causes in London, the first known holder of that office. He was appointed Serjeant-at-Law in Michaelmas term 1580, was appointed third baron of the exchequer in the following year (27 November), being assigned to the northern circuit, and on 29 May 1584 was translated to the court of Queen's Bench. Many of his judgements there can be read in the Reports of Sir George Croke.

=== Estate at Holbrook ===
In 1585 (soon after his appointment as Justice in 1584) he purchased the manor of Great Bealings, near Woodbridge, from Edmund Bedingfield. There he was neighbour to the Seckfords of Seckford Hall manor. His former benefactor Henry Crane of Chilton (who predeceased his father Robert Crane) appointed Clench sole supervisor of his will in 1586, leaving him a gelding. Clench developed his estate at Holbrook, Suffolk (below Ipswich beside the river Orwell), during the later 1580s. Having purchased lands "late Kinderslewes" at Holbrook, which lay intermingled with lands belonging to the town of Ipswich, in 1587 he offered them to the town in exchange for others, but on consideration the town did not like them. Instead, the town sold its own Holbrook lands (part of Edmund Daundy's charitable gift of 1515) to Clench for £600 in September 1588 by bargain, sale and feoffment, and in May 1589 the fine, concord and conveyance were issued by the bailiffs, burgesses and commonalty of the town under the common seal, and the Clench deeds were ordered to be kept with the deeds of Tooley's Foundation (a principal benefaction of the town's) in the Borough Chest.

In 1589 he purchased the manor of Holbrook from Sir Robert Southwell and his wife Elizabeth, and in that year and in 1591 fines were levied between Southwell and Thomas Clench, son and heir of the judge, to whom the Holbrook estate in due course descended. Thenceforth the judge resided at Holbrook. It is stated that Holbrook Park, described as a detached pleasure ground for Woolverstone Hall nearby, originated in the late 16th century as an independent park or garden surrounding John Clench's residence at Holbrook.

=== Later career ===
He was, with Francis Gawdy, Francis Wyndham and William Peryam, one of the four justices appointed to hear causes in Chancery in the six months which intervened between the death of the Lord Chancellor, Sir Christopher Hatton (20 November 1591), and the appointment of his successor, Sir John Puckering. He remained, however, attached to the northern circuit, apparently until his retirement. In August 1588 he and Francis Rodes, as justices of assize at Carlisle, set down orders for the maintenance of peace in disputes arising from the estates of the late Lord Dacre. A letter from the same judges dated 1588/89 instructs the deputy lieutenants of Lancashire to investigate and suppress the surplus alehouses of Manchester.

Clench took part in the hearings against Margaret Clitherow in 1586, and sought to help her to avoid her sufferings. In 1596 he took the Lincoln assizes with Chief Justice Anderson, the bulk of the criminal business consisting, as it would seem, of cases of ecclesiastical recusancy. The unknown writer of a letter preserved in John Strype's Annals observed:

"The demeanour of him (Anderson, a zealous high churchman) and the other judge, as they sit by turns upon the gaol (with reverence I speak it) in these matters is flat opposite; and they which are maliciously affected, when Mr. Justice Clinch sitteth upon the gaol, do labour to adjourn their complaints (though they be before upon the file) to the next assize; and the gentlemen in the several shires are endangered by this means to be cast into a faction."

Clench is said to have been an especial favourite with Elizabeth I. When, in their circuit of 1592, Justice Walmsley released certain indicted men on bail against the queen's direct command, the monarch was careful to express her displeasure towards Walmsley alone. Nevertheless, Clench was not knighted, nor in such ways honoured. In 1598 he was named (as assignor to the wardens of the Tooley Foundation) in the will of Ipswich benefactor William Smarte to be among the agents of his gifts and legacies. In 1600, while retaining the emoluments of his juridical office, he was released from daily attendance at court on account of age and infirmities, and three years later he was pensioned.

=== Death, monument and epitaph ===
John Clench died on 19 August 1607 at his seat at Holbrook, Suffolk and was buried in Holbrook Church, where his extensive monument with life-sized recumbent effigies is inscribed to his memory:

"In obitum Colendissimi sviq[u]e temporis antiquissimi Ivdicis Iohannes Clenche, qvi obiit xix die Avgvsti Anno Salvtis 1607
Ecce iacet secto venerandus Marmore ivdex
Terram terra petit, puluere corpus inest
Ast anima ad superos sum[m]iq[ue] palatia caeli
Fertum et æterni viuit in arce Dei."

("A memorial of the most worshipful and (in his time) the most Auncient Judge, John Clenche, who died on the 19th day of August in the year of Salvation 1607.
See, carved in marble lies the reverend judge:
Earth turns to earth, and flesh is cased in dust,
But, borne aloft to halls of highest heaven
The soul lives ever in God's citadel.")

Easily obscured due to its low profile, the front of the tomb of the female effigy bears an inscription in English:

"HERE LYETH MARGERIE CLENCHE LATE WIFE TO
THOMAS CLENCHE ESQUIER. ELDEST SONNE OF THE
JUDGE) AND DAUGHTER OF JOHN BARKER OF IPSWICH
ESQUIER WHO LYVED VERTUOUSLIE AND DIED
IN THE FAITHE OF CHRISTE THE 2^{D} DAYE OF
JULIE 1597."

The figure of the judge in scarlet robe and ermine-lined mantle supports himself as if in life, with open eyes, on his left elbow. He wears the coif, and a square cap, and (formerly) had a scroll in his hand. In front of the tomb-chest, at a lower level, reposes the figure of Margerie Clench, the judge's daughter-in-law, in a similar position, her elbow on an embroidered cushion to support her head, and a book in the right hand. "She wears a 'French hood', with pendant liripipe, in front of which the hair is drawn up or stiffened on supports in a sort of puff. The gown is well extended at the hips, and the sleeves set in with a puff at the shoulder." Four sons and eight daughters are shown as kneeling mourners beside the judge: beside his daughter-in-law only two boys and three girls appear.

The wall panel above the monument displays heraldry for Clench, and two impalements showing Clench impaling quarterly arms for Barker (of Ipswich). This probably denotes that the monument was set up by Thomas Clench, the judge's eldest son and heir, to whose first marriage this impalement refers. It is recorded that in November 1624, on the very day that the judge's son Thomas died, the right arm fell off the judge's effigy.

=== Heraldry ===
The Blois Manuscripts give the Clench heraldry as follows:

- Gules, six annulets Or, conjoined in pairs, two pairs in chief and one in base, a chief of the second.

The Suffolk Visitation of 1577 has:

- Gules, three gimmel rings and a chief Or

The Revett Pedigree represents the marriage of John Clench to Katheryn Almott:

- Clench, impaling Quarterly 1 and 4, Argent on a bend cotised Sable 3 escallops of the first: 2 and 3, Argent, a chevron between three mullets of 6 points Gules.

=== Portraits ===
A half-length portrait of Clench in his robes was long preserved at Harden Hall (the seat in the nineteenth century of Lord Alvanley) in Cheshire, but appears to have been among the works of art dispersed in 1815. An engraved portrait of Clench is one of the composite panel of images forming the frontispiece of The Conveyancers Light, a seventeenth-century book of precedents. A portrait of the judge was in the keeping of the town clerk of Ipswich in 1831: the engraving by Wenceslaus Hollar, said to be based on the Ipswich portrait, was published by Sir William Dugdale in the Origines Juridicales (1666). A miniature possibly representing John Clench was sold from the Merchiston Collection at Bonhams in 2009. A full-length portrait of him is said to have hung at Wilbraham Temple, Cambridgeshire, while it was in the possession of the Clench family.

== Family ==
Clench was married to Katheryn, daughter of Thomas Almott of Creeting All Saints, by whom he had issue five sons and eight daughters.

- His heir, Thomas Clench of Holbrook, M.P. (c. 1557-1624), married (1) Margery, daughter of John Barker, merchant and M.P., of Ipswich: she was the mother of his children. Margery died in 1597, and he next married (2), in 1601, Elizabeth, daughter of Thomas Revesby (Risby) of Lavenham, and relict of Henry Wingfield of Crowfield; and lastly (3), in c. 1609, he took to wife Ann, daughter of John Burd of Denston, Suffolk, and relict of Sir Anthony Wingfield of Goodwin's Place, Hoo, Suffolk. He was sheriff of Suffolk in 1616, and junior M.P. for the same county in 1621. His will is dated 5 November 1624.
- The judge's second son, John Clench of Bealings, married Joan, daughter of Robert Holmes of Wyverstone, Suffolk (and relict of John Pretyman of Bacton, Suffolk), by whom he had four sons. John and Joan have a mural monument with bust-length figures at Great Bealings in Suffolk. His will is dated 3 April 1628. One John Clench of Creeting was sheriff of Suffolk in 1630.
- Thomas Clench
- Robert Clench
- John Clench
- Margery Clench, married Edmund Dameron of Henley, Suffolk
- Joanne Clench, married (1) John Walker of Brundon, Essex, and (2) Walter Merser of Oxfordshire
- Lore Clench, married Thomas Bacon of Bramford, Suffolk, Gent.
- Katherin Clench, married John Truelove of Harkstead, Suffolk
- Elizabeth Clench, married Thomas Hall of Clopton, Suffolk
- Anne Clench, married John Geffray of Chevington, Suffolk
- Presila Clench, died unmarried
- Thomasin Clench, married Thomas Randolph, of Kent
