= Bassingbourne Gawdy =

Bassingbourne Gawdy may refer to:

- Bassingbourne Gawdy (MP for Eye), died 1590
- Bassingbourne Gawdy II (1560-1606), MP for Thetford and Norfolk, son of the preceding
