= Eye (constituency) =

Parliamentary constituency in the United Kingdom, 1801–1983

- Former county constituency for the House of Commons
- County: Suffolk
- Major settlements: Eye, Saxmundham

1885–1983
- Seats: One
- Replaced by: Central Suffolk and Suffolk Coastal

1571–1885
- Seats: Two until 1832, then one until 1885
- Type of constituency: Borough constituency

Eye was a parliamentary constituency, represented in the House of Commons of the Parliament of the United Kingdom, encompassing an area around the market town and civil parish of Eye, Suffolk.

== History ==
Eye was once the smallest borough in the country, its claim based on the 1205 Charter of King John. The Charter was renewed in 1408, then many more times by successive monarchs. However, in 1885, the Town Clerk of Hythe, 125 miles (201 km) south by land, proved that the original Charter belonged only to Hythe in Kent, the error having arisen from the similarity of their original Old English names, both building off a related root phrase (Hythe: landing place, Eye: land by water). The error was confirmed by archivists in the 1950s, but borough status was not discontinued until 1974 after government reorganization when Eye became a parish but retained a Town Council, a Mayor and the insignia.

From 1571 to 1707, the Parliamentary Borough of Eye elected two Members of Parliament (MPs) by the bloc vote system of election to the House of Commons of England, then from 1707 to 1800 to the House of Commons of Great Britain, and from 1801 to 1832 to the House of Commons of the United Kingdom. By the mid eighteenth century it tended to be seen as a pocket borough of Earl Cornwallis who could nominate the two MPs. The Reform Act 1832 reduced its representation to one MP, elected by the first past the post system. The parliamentary borough was abolished under the Redistribution of Seats Act 1885, and was reconstituted as one of five single-member county divisions of the Parliamentary County of Suffolk, becoming a county constituency from the 1950 general election.

This in turn was abolished for the 1983 general election when western areas, comprising the majority, became part of the new county constituency of Central Suffolk, with eastern areas forming part of the new county constituency of Suffolk Coastal.

The seat's main claim to fame was that it was the smallest town to have a parliamentary constituency named after it as the town of Eye had only approximately 1500 voters in 1981. It had been mostly a Liberal seat until 1951, after which it became a safe Conservative seat.

== Boundaries and boundary changes ==
=== 1885–1918 ===
- The Municipal Borough of Eye;
- The Sessional Divisions of Framlingham, Hartismere, and Hoxne; and
- Part of the Sessional Division of Blything.

Formed from parts of the abolished Eastern and Western Divisions of Suffolk and incorporating the abolished Parliamentary Borough of Eye. Apart from Eye, the main town was Saxmundham.

=== 1918–1950 ===
- The Municipal Borough of Eye;
- The Urban Districts of Halesworth, Leiston-cum-Sizewell, Saxmundham, and Stowmarket;
- The Rural Districts of East Stow, Hartismere, and Hoxne; and
- Parts of the Rural Districts of Blything and Plomesgate.

Gained southernmost part of the Lowestoft Division, including Halesworth, and a small area to the east of the abolished Stowmarket Division, including the town of Stowmarket itself.

=== 1950–1983 ===
- The Municipal Boroughs of Aldeburgh and Eye;
- The Urban Districts of Leiston-cum-Sizewell, Saxmundham, and Stowmarket;
- The Rural Districts of Blyth, Gipping, and Hartismere; and
- The Rural District of Deben parishes of Blaxhall, Boulge, Bredfield, Burgh, Campsey Ash, Charsfield, Chillesford, Clopton, Cretingham, Dallinghoo, Dallinghoo Wield, Debach, Eyke, Gedgrave, Grundisburgh, Hoo, Iken, Letheringham, Monewden, Orford, Otley, Pettistree, Rendlesham, Sudbourne, Swilland, Tunstall, Ufford, Wantisden, Wickham Market, and Witnesham.

Extended southwards to gain Aldeburgh and mainly rural areas from the northern part of the abolished Woodbridge Division of East Suffolk. Area previously transferred from Lowestoft (including Halesworth) now returned.

== Members of Parliament ==
=== Eye borough ===
==== MPs 1571–1660 ====
Parliament	First member	Second member
1571	Richard Bedell	Charles Cutler
1572	Charles Calthorpe	Charles Cutler
1584	Bassingbourne Gawdy	George Brooke
1586	Bartholomew Kemp	Thomas Bedingfield
1588	Edward Grimston	Sir Edmund Bacon
1593	Edward Honnyng, eldest son of William Honnyng	Philip Gawdy
1597	Anthony Gawdy	Edward Honnyng, eldest son of William Honnyng
1601	Edward Honnyng, eldest son of William Honnyng	Anthony Gawdy
1604	Edward Honnyng, eldest son of William Honnyng	Sir Henry Bockenham
1610	Sir John Kay	Sir Henry Bockenham
1614	Sir Robert Drury	Huntingdon Colby
1621–1622	Sir Roger North	Sir John Crompton
1624	Sir Henry Crofts	Francis Finch
1625	Francis Finch	Sir Roger North
1626	Francis Finch	Sir Roger North
1628	Francis Finch	Sir Roger North
1629–1640	No Parliaments summoned	
1640 (Apr)	Sir Frederick Cornwallis	Sir Roger North
1640 (Nov)	Sir Frederick Cornwallis	Sir Roger North
1645	Morris Barrow	Sir Roger North
1648	?	
1653	Eye not represented in Barebones Parliament	
1654	Eye not represented in 1st Protectorate Parliament	
1655	Eye not represented in 2nd Protectorate Parliament	
1659	Edward Dendy	Joseph Blisset

==== MPs 1660–1832 ====
Election	First member	First party	Second member	Second party
1660	Charles Cornwallis	Court Party	Sir George Reeve	Court Party
1661	Charles Cornwallis, senior		Sir George Reeve	Court Party
1675	Sir Robert Reeve		Sir George Reeve	Court Party
1678	Sir Robert Reeve		Sir Charles Gawdy	Tory
1679	Charles Fox	Tory	George Walsh	
1681	Sir Charles Gawdy	Tory	Sir Robert Reeve	
1685	Sir Charles Gawdy	Tory	Sir John Rous	Tory
1689	Thomas Knyvett	Tory	Henry Poley	Tory
1690	Thomas Davenant		Henry Poley	Tory
1695	Thomas Davenant		Charles Cornwallis	Whig
1697	Sir Joseph Jekyll	Whig	Charles Cornwallis	Whig
1698	Sir Joseph Jekyll	Whig	Hon. Spencer Compton	Tory
1701	Sir Joseph Jekyll	Whig	Hon. Spencer Compton	Whig
1710	Sir Joseph Jekyll	Whig	Thomas Maynard	Whig
1713	Edward Hopkins	Whig	Thomas Maynard	Whig
1715	Edward Hopkins	Whig	Thomas Smith	Whig
March 1722	Edward Hopkins	Whig	Hon. Spencer Compton	Whig
November 1722	Edward Hopkins	Whig	James Cornwallis	Whig
1727	Stephen Cornwallis	Whig	John Cornwallis	Whig
1743	Edward Cornwallis	Whig	John Cornwallis	Whig
1747	Edward Cornwallis	Whig	Roger Townshend	Whig
1748	Edward Cornwallis	Whig	Nicholas Hardinge	
1749	Courthorpe Clayton		Nicholas Hardinge	
1758	Courthorpe Clayton		Henry Townshend	
1760	Courthorpe Clayton		Viscount Brome	Whig
March 1761	Henry Cornwallis		Viscount Brome	Whig
December 1761	Henry Townshend		Viscount Brome	Whig
1762	The Viscount Allen		Richard Burton	
1768	The Viscount Allen		Hon. William Cornwallis	
1770	Richard Burton Phillipson		Hon. William Cornwallis	
March 1774	Richard Burton Phillipson		Francis Osborne, Marquess of Carmarthen	Tory
October 1774	Richard Burton Phillipson		John St John	
1780	Richard Burton Phillipson		Arnoldus Jones-Skelton	
1782	Richard Burton Phillipson		Hon. William Cornwallis	
1784	Richard Burton Phillipson		Peter Bathurst	Pittite
1790	Richard Burton Phillipson		Hon. William Cornwallis	
1792	Peter Bathurst	Pittite	Hon. William Cornwallis	
1795	Viscount Brome	Tory	Hon. William Cornwallis	
1796	Mark Singleton		Hon. William Cornwallis	
1799	James Cornwallis	Tory	Hon. William Cornwallis	
1806	Marquess of Huntly	Tory	Hon. William Cornwallis	
January 1807	Marquess of Huntly	Tory	James Cornwallis	Tory
April 1807	Hon. Henry Wellesley	Tory	James Cornwallis	Tory
May 1807	Hon. Henry Wellesley	Tory	Mark Singleton	
1809	Charles Arbuthnot	Tory	Mark Singleton	
1812	Sir William Garrow	Whig	Mark Singleton	
1817	Sir Robert Gifford	Tory	Mark Singleton	
1820	Sir Robert Gifford	Tory	Sir Miles Nightingall	Tory
1824	Sir Edward Kerrison, Bt	Tory	Sir Miles Nightingall	Tory
1829	Sir Edward Kerrison, Bt	Tory	Sir Philip Sidney, Bt	Tory
1831	Sir Edward Kerrison, Bt	Tory	William Burge	Tory
1832	Representation reduced to one member			

==== MPs 1832–1885 ====
Election	Member	Party
1832	Sir Edward Kerrison, Bt	Tory
1834	Sir Edward Kerrison, Bt	Conservative
1852	Edward Kerrison	Conservative
1866 by-election	Hon. George Barrington	Conservative
1880	Ellis Ashmead-Bartlett	Conservative
1885	Borough abolished – name transferred to county division	

=== Eye division of Suffolk ===
==== MPs 1885–1983 ====
Election	Member	Party
1885	Francis Seymour Stevenson	Liberal
1906 by-election	Harold Pearson	Liberal
1918	Alexander Lyle-Samuel	Liberal
1923	The Lord Huntingfield	Conservative
1929	Edgar Granville	Liberal
1931	Edgar Granville	Liberal National
1942	Edgar Granville	Independent
1945	Edgar Granville	Liberal
1951	Sir Harwood Harrison	Conservative
1979	John Gummer	Conservative
1983	constituency abolished: see Suffolk Central	

== Elections ==
=== Elections in the 1830s ===
General election 1830: Eye
Party	Candidate	Votes	%
Tory	Edward Kerrison	Unopposed	
Tory	Philip Sidney	Unopposed	
Tory hold			
Tory hold			

Sidney resigned, causing a by-election.

By-election, 14 March 1831: Eye
Party	Candidate	Votes	%
Tory	William Burge	Unopposed	
Tory hold			

General election 1831: Eye
Party	Candidate	Votes	%
Tory	Edward Kerrison	Unopposed	
Tory	William Burge	Unopposed	
Registered electors		c. 125	
Tory hold			
Tory hold			

General election 1832: Eye
Party	Candidate	Votes	%	±%
Tory	Edward Kerrison	Unopposed		
Registered electors		253		
Tory hold				

General election 1835: Eye
Party	Candidate	Votes	%	±%
Conservative	Edward Kerrison	Unopposed		
Registered electors		282		
Conservative hold				

General election 1837: Eye
Party	Candidate	Votes	%	±%
Conservative	Edward Kerrison	Unopposed		
Registered electors		301		
Conservative hold				

=== Elections in the 1840s ===
General election 1841: Eye
Party	Candidate	Votes	%	±%
Conservative	Edward Kerrison	Unopposed		
Registered electors		342		
Conservative hold				

General election 1847: Eye
Party	Candidate	Votes	%	±%
Conservative	Edward Kerrison	Unopposed		
Registered electors		322		
Conservative hold				

=== Elections in the 1850s ===
General election 1852: Eye
Party	Candidate	Votes	%	±%
Conservative	Edward Kerrison	Unopposed		
Registered electors		356		
Conservative hold				

General election 1857: Eye
Party	Candidate	Votes	%	±%
Conservative	Edward Kerrison	Unopposed		
Registered electors		359		
Conservative hold				

General election 1859: Eye
Party	Candidate	Votes	%	±%
Conservative	Edward Kerrison	Unopposed		
Registered electors		342		
Conservative hold				

=== Elections in the 1860s ===
General election 1865: Eye
Party	Candidate	Votes	%	±%
Conservative	Edward Kerrison	Unopposed		
Registered electors		339		
Conservative hold				

Kerrison resigned in order to contest the 1866 by-election in East Suffolk.

By-election, 27 July 1866: Eye
Party	Candidate	Votes	%	±%
Conservative	George Barrington	Unopposed		
Conservative hold				

General election 1868: Eye
Party	Candidate	Votes	%	±%
Conservative	George Barrington	Unopposed		
Registered electors		1,198		
Conservative hold				

=== Elections in the 1870s ===
General election 1874: Eye
Party	Candidate	Votes	%	±%
Conservative	George Barrington	Unopposed		
Registered electors		1,163		
Conservative hold				

Barrington was appointed Vice-Chamberlain of the Household, requiring a by-election.

By-election, 19 Mar 1874: Eye
Party	Candidate	Votes	%	±%
Conservative	George Barrington	656	63.0	N/A
Liberal	Charles Easton	386	37.0	New
Majority		270	26.0	N/A
Turnout		1,042	89.6	N/A
Registered electors		1,163		
Conservative hold		Swing	N/A	

=== Elections in the 1880s ===
General election 1880: Eye
Party	Candidate	Votes	%	±%
Conservative	Ellis Ashmead-Bartlett	540	53.0	N/A
Liberal	Charles Easton	478	47.0	N/A
Majority		62	6.0	N/A
Turnout		1,018	94.2	N/A
Registered electors		1,081		
Conservative hold		Swing	N/A	

Bartlett was appointed a Civil Lord of the Admiralty, requiring a by-election.

By-election, 2 Jul 1885: Eye
Party	Candidate	Votes	%	±%
Conservative	Ellis Ashmead-Bartlett	473	58.5	+5.5
Liberal	Mervyn Lanark Hawkes	336	41.5	−5.5
Majority		137	17.0	+11.0
Turnout		809	82.3	−11.9
Registered electors		983		
Conservative hold		Swing	+5.5	

Stevenson

General election 1885: Eye
Party	Candidate	Votes	%	±%
Liberal	Francis Seymour Stevenson	5,356	61.5	+14.5
Conservative	Benjamin Bridges Hunter Rodwell	3,360	38.5	−14.5
Majority		1,996	23.0	N/A
Turnout		8,716	79.3	−13.9
Registered electors		10,993		
Liberal gain from Conservative		Swing	+14.5	

General election 1886: Eye
Party	Candidate	Votes	%	±%
Liberal	Francis Seymour Stevenson	4,544	60.7	−0.8
Liberal Unionist	James Colquhoun Revell Reade	2,938	39.3	+0.8
Majority		1,606	21.4	−1.6
Turnout		7,482	68.1	−11.2
Registered electors		10,993		
Liberal hold		Swing	−0.8	

=== Elections in the 1890s ===
Holland

General election 1892: Eye
Party	Candidate	Votes	%	±%
Liberal	Francis Seymour Stevenson	4,701	57.8	−2.9
Conservative	Lionel Holland	3,431	42.2	+2.9
Majority		1,270	15.6	−5.8
Turnout		8,132	78.8	+10.7
Registered electors		10,321		
Liberal hold		Swing	−2.9	

General election 1895: Eye
Party	Candidate	Votes	%	±%
Liberal	Francis Seymour Stevenson	4,437	55.2	−2.6
Conservative	Frederick John Francis Wootton Isaacson	3,603	44.8	+2.6
Majority		834	10.4	−5.2
Turnout		8,040	77.8	−1.0
Registered electors		10,339		
Liberal hold		Swing	−2.6	

=== Elections in the 1900s ===
Harben

General election 1900: Eye
Party	Candidate	Votes	%	±%
Liberal	Francis Seymour Stevenson	4,664	61.3	+6.1
Conservative	Henry Harben	2,947	38.7	−6.1
Majority		1,717	22.6	+12.2
Turnout		7,611	74.9	−2.9
Registered electors		10,162		
Liberal hold		Swing	+6.1	

General election 1906: Eye
Party	Candidate	Votes	%	±%
Liberal	Francis Seymour Stevenson	Unopposed		
Liberal hold				

Pearson

1906 Eye by-election
Party	Candidate	Votes	%	±%
Liberal	Harold Pearson	4,568	51.1	N/A
Conservative	James Graham	4,371	48.9	New
Majority		197	2.2	N/A
Turnout		8,939	87.9	N/A
Registered electors		10,166		
Liberal hold		Swing	N/A	

=== Elections in the 1910s ===
General election January 1910: Eye
Party	Candidate	Votes	%	±%
Liberal	Harold Pearson	4,991	52.0	N/A
Conservative	James Graham	4,614	48.0	N/A
Majority		377	4.0	+1.8
Turnout		9,605	90.4	+2.5
Registered electors		10,621		
Liberal hold		Swing	+0.9	

General election December 1910: Eye
Party	Candidate	Votes	%	±%
Liberal	Harold Pearson	4,927	54.2	+2.2
Liberal Unionist	George Borwick, 2nd Baron Borwick	4,157	45.8	−2.2
Majority		770	8.4	+4.4
Turnout		9,084	85.5	−4.9
Registered electors		10,621		
Liberal hold		Swing	+2.2	

General Election 1914–15:

Another General Election was required to take place before the end of 1915. The political parties had been making preparations for an election to take place from 1914 and by the end of this year, the following candidates had been selected;

- Liberal: Harold Pearson
- Unionist:

General election 1918: Eye
Party		Candidate	Votes	%	±%
C	Liberal	Alexander Lyle-Samuel	10,072	61.3	+7.1
	Unionist	Frederick William French	6,362	38.7	−7.1
Majority			3,710	22.6	+14.2
Turnout			16,434	49.2	−36.3
Registered electors			33,399		
	Liberal hold		Swing	+7.1	
C indicates candidate endorsed by the coalition government.

=== Elections in the 1920s ===
General election 1922: Eye
Party	Candidate	Votes	%	±%
Liberal	Alexander Lyle-Samuel	10,556	60.0	−1.3
National Liberal	Gerald Howard	7,025	40.0	N/A
Majority		3,531	20.0	−2.6
Turnout		17,581	54.0	+4.8
Registered electors		32,579		
Liberal hold		Swing		

General election 1923: Eye
Party	Candidate	Votes	%	±%
Unionist	William Vanneck	11,172	47.7	New
Liberal	Alexander Lyle-Samuel	9,244	39.5	−20.5
Labour	Charles Wye Kendall	2,984	12.8	New
Majority		1,928	8.2	N/A
Turnout		23,400	70.9	+16.9
Registered electors		32,999		
Unionist gain from Liberal		Swing	N/A	

General election 1924: Eye
Party	Candidate	Votes	%	±%
Unionist	William Vanneck	13,450	53.3	+5.6
Liberal	Thomas Bethell	7,441	29.5	−10.0
Labour	Charles Wye Kendall	4,329	17.2	+4.4
Majority		6,009	23.8	+15.6
Turnout		25,220	74.5	+3.6
Registered electors		33,841		
Unionist hold		Swing	+7.8	

General election 1929: Eye
Party	Candidate	Votes	%	±%
Liberal	Edgar Granville	13,944	44.3	+14.8
Unionist	Arthur Gilstrap Soames	12,880	40.8	−12.5
Labour	Owen Aves	4,709	14.9	−2.3
Majority		1,064	3.5	N/A
Turnout		31,533	78.2	+3.7
Registered electors		40,340		
Liberal gain from Unionist		Swing	+13.7	

=== Elections in the 1930s ===
General election 1931: Eye
Party	Candidate	Votes	%	±%
National Liberal	Edgar Granville	Unopposed	N/A	N/A
National Liberal hold				

General election 1935: Eye
Party	Candidate	Votes	%	±%
National Liberal	Edgar Granville	21,606	73.95	N/A
Labour	Harry Leonard Self	7,613	26.05	New
Majority		13,993	47.90	N/A
Turnout		29,219	70.69	N/A
National Liberal hold		Swing	N/A	

=== Elections in the 1940s ===
General Election 1939–40:

Another General Election was required to take place before the end of 1940. The political parties had been making preparations for an election to take place from 1939 and by the end of this year, the following candidates had been selected;

- Liberal: Edgar Granville
- Labour: Harry Leonard Self
- British Union: Ronald Noah Creasy

General election 1945: Eye
Party	Candidate	Votes	%	±%
Liberal	Edgar Granville	11,899	38.46	
Conservative	Algernon Malcolm Borthwick	10,950	35.39	
Labour	B Collingson	8,089	26.15	+0.10
Majority		949	3.07	
Turnout		30,938	71.74	
Liberal hold		Swing		

=== Elections in the 1950s ===
General election 1950: Eye
Party	Candidate	Votes	%	±%
Liberal	Edgar Granville	17,755	37.27	−1.19
Conservative	Harwood Harrison	17,128	36.96	+0.57
Labour	Leslie George Emsden	12,474	26.19	+0.04
Communist	Lee Chadwick	271	0.58	New
Majority		627	0.31	−2.76
Turnout		47,628	83.8	+12.1
Liberal hold		Swing	−0.88	

General election 1951: Eye
Party	Candidate	Votes	%	±%
Conservative	Harwood Harrison	19,791	40.61	+4.65
Liberal	Edgar Granville	17,602	36.12	−1.15
Labour	Harold F Falconer	11,340	23.27	−2.92
Majority		2,189	4.49	N/A
Turnout		48,733	83.28	
Conservative gain from Liberal		Swing		

General election 1955: Eye
Party	Candidate	Votes	%	±%
Conservative	Harwood Harrison	21,317	45.04	+4.43
Labour	Edgar Granville	20,428	43.16	+19.89
Liberal	Inga-Stina Robson	5,582	11.79	−24.33
Majority		898	1.88	
Turnout		47,327	82.90	
Conservative hold		Swing		

General election 1959: Eye
Party	Candidate	Votes	%	±%
Conservative	Harwood Harrison	22,333	47.12	+2.08
Labour	Edgar Granville	19,849	41.88	−1.28
Liberal	Inga-Stina Robson	5,215	11.00	−0.79
Majority		2,484	5.24	
Turnout		47,397	84.04	
Conservative hold		Swing		

=== Elections in the 1960s ===
General election 1964: Eye
Party	Candidate	Votes	%	±%
Conservative	Harwood Harrison	21,555	45.74	
Labour	John Wilson Fear	16,129	34.23	
Liberal	Donald James Newby	9,437	20.03	
Majority		5,426	11.51	
Turnout		47,121	82.54	
Conservative hold		Swing		

General election 1966: Eye
Party	Candidate	Votes	%	±%
Conservative	Harwood Harrison	21,044	44.65	
Labour	Richard Wallis Speaight Pryke	17,431	36.98	
Liberal	Donald James Newby	8,661	18.37	
Majority		3,613	7.67	
Turnout		47,136	81.48	
Conservative hold		Swing		

=== Elections in the 1970s ===
General election 1970: Eye
Party	Candidate	Votes	%	±%
Conservative	Harwood Harrison	26,099	52.41	
Labour	Roy Ellison Manley	17,735	35.62	
Liberal	Ian Stanley Temple Senior	5,962	11.97	
Majority		8,364	16.79	
Turnout		49,796	78.12	
Conservative hold		Swing		

General election February 1974: Eye
Party	Candidate	Votes	%	±%
Conservative	Harwood Harrison	23,486	43.61	
Liberal	Denys Robinson	15,811	29.36	
Labour	Roy Ellison Manley	13,937	25.88	
PEOPLE	Edward Goldsmith	395	0.73	New
Independent Democratic Alliance	Albert Kingham	220	0.41	New
Majority		7,675	14.25	
Turnout		53,849	82.64	
Conservative hold		Swing		

General election October 1974: Eye
Party	Candidate	Votes	%	±%
Conservative	Harwood Harrison	22,387	44.01	
Liberal	Denys Robinson	14,530	28.57	
Labour	Ranken Bushby	13,948	27.42	
Majority		7,857	15.44	
Turnout		50,865	77.41	
Conservative hold		Swing		

General election 1979: Eye
Party	Candidate	Votes	%	±%
Conservative	John Gummer	28,707	51.96	
Labour	Paul Koppel	13,686	24.77	
Liberal	Peter Kemsley	12,259	22.19	
Independent	JJ Flint	324	0.59	New
Anti-Common Market Conservative	Norman Rogers	268	0.49	New
Majority		15,021	27.19	
Turnout		55,244	79.10	
Conservative hold		Swing		

== See also ==
- List of parliamentary constituencies in Suffolk
