= Bokenham =

Bokenham is an English surname. It is a variant of Buckenham. Notable people with the surname include:

- Henry Bokenham (c. 1575–1638), English politician
- Osbern Bokenham (c. 1393–c. 1463), English author and friar
- William Bokenham (died 1702), British naval officer and member of parliament for Rochester
