= Roger North (died 1651) =

English politician (1577–1651)

Sir Roger North (18 February 1577 – 17 June 1651) was an English politician who sat in the House of Commons at various times between 1621 and 1648.

North was the son of Sir Henry North of Mildenhall, Suffolk and his wife, Mary Knevit, daughter of Richard Knevit, the grandson of Sir William Knyvett (d. 1515). He was knighted on 16 June 1618.

In 1621, North was elected Member of Parliament for Eye. He was then elected MP for Suffolk in 1624. In 1625, he was re-elected for Eye and retained the seat in the 1626 and 1628 elections. He sat until 1629 when King Charles decided to rule without parliament for eleven years.

In April 1640, North was re-elected MP for Eye in the Short Parliament. He was re-elected MP for Eye in the Long Parliament in November 1640 and sat until 1648 when he was excluded under Pride's Purge. North died at the age of 74 on 17 June 1651.

== Marriages ==
North married, firstly, Elizabeth Gilbert, daughter of Sir John Gilbert of Great Finborough, Suffolk and had two sons and a daughter. Elizabeth died on 29 November 1612. He married, secondly, Thomasine, daughter of Thomas Clence of Holbrook. His son, Henry, succeeded him and became a Baronet.

Parliament of England
Preceded by Sir John Crompton; Sir William Croft	Member of Parliament for Eye; 1621–1622; With: Sir John Crompton	Succeeded by Henry Crofts; Francis Finch
Preceded by Sir Robert Crane, 1st Baronet; Thomas Clinch	Member of Parliament for Suffolk; 1624; With: Sir William Spring	Succeeded by Sir Edmund Bacon, 2nd Baronet; Thomas Cornwallis
Preceded by Henry Crofts; Francis Finch	Member of Parliament for Eye; 1625–1629; With: Francis Finch	Parliament suspended until 1640
Vacant Parliament suspended since 1629	Member of Parliament for Eye; 1640–1648; With: Sir Frederick Cornwallis 1640–1642; Morris Barrow 1645–1648	Not represented in Rump Parliament
