= Christian name =

Religious personal name given on the occasion of a Christian baptism

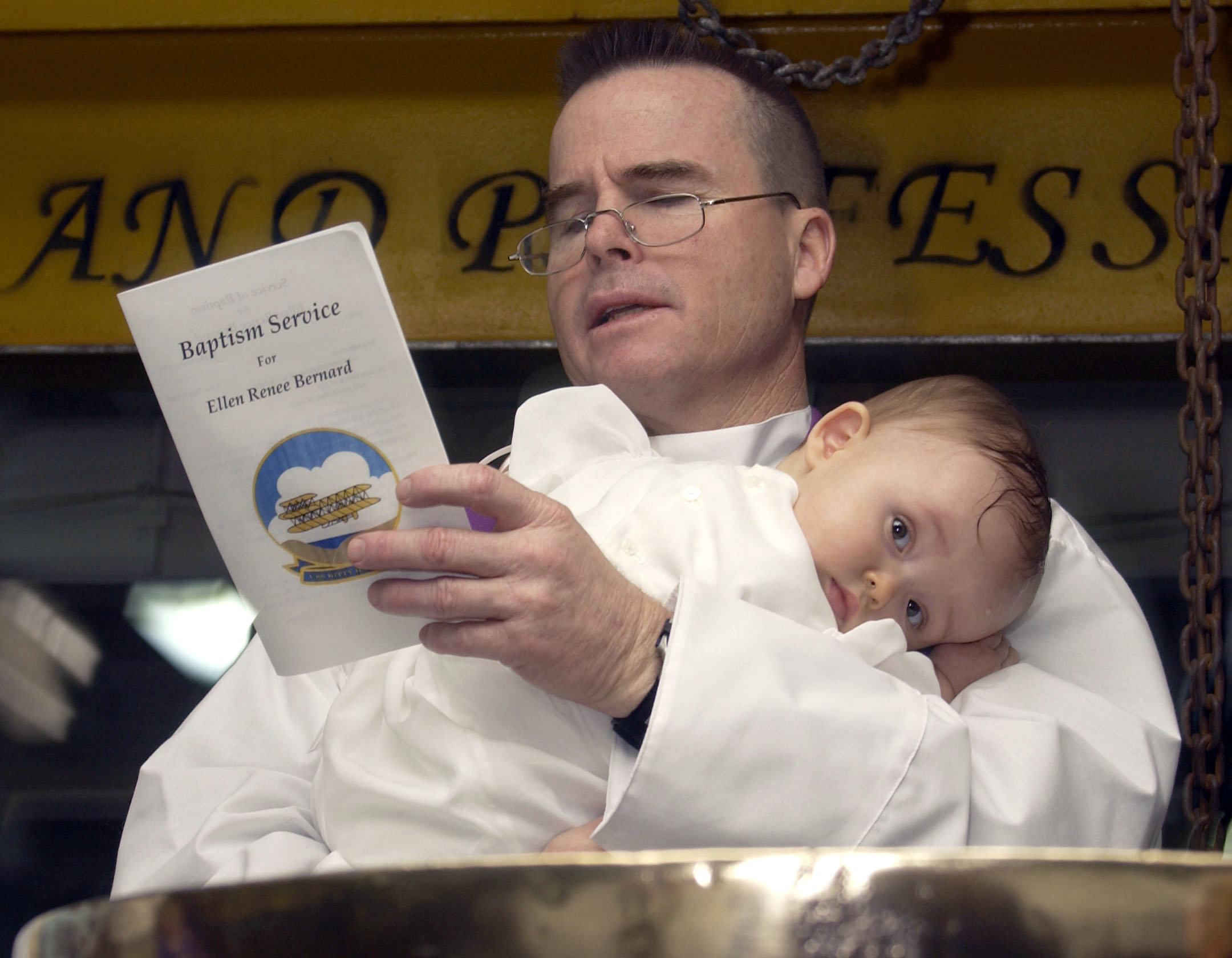
A baptism, at which Christian names are traditionally given

A Christian name, sometimes referred to as a baptismal name, is a personal name given on the occasion of a Christian baptism, though now most often given by parents at birth. In English-speaking cultures, a person's Christian name is commonly their first name and is typically the name by which the person is primarily known.

Traditionally, a Christian name was given on the occasion of Christian baptism, with the ubiquity of infant baptism in modern and medieval Christendom. In Elizabethan England, as suggested by William Camden, the term Christian name was not necessarily related to baptism, used merely in the sense of "given name": Christian names were imposed for the distinction of persons, surnames for the difference of families. In more modern times, the terms have been used interchangeably with given name, first name and forename in traditionally Christian countries, and are still common in day-to-day use.

Strictly speaking, the Christian name is not merely the forename distinctive of the individual member of a family, but the name given to the person (generally a child) at their christening or baptism. In pre-Reformation England, the laity was taught to administer baptism in case of necessity with the words: "I christen thee in the name of the Father, and of the Son, and of the Holy Spirit". To "christen" in this context is therefore to "baptise", and "Christian name" means "baptismal name".

== Origin ==
In view of the Hebrew practice of giving a name to the male child at the time of his circumcision on the eighth day after birth (Luke 1:59), it has been maintained that the custom of conferring a name upon the newly baptised was of Apostolic origin. For instance, the apostle of the Gentiles was called Saul before his conversion and Paul afterwards. But modern scholars have rejected this contention, since the baptism of St. Paul is recorded in Acts 9:18, but the name Paul does not occur before Acts 13:9 while Saul is found several times in the interval. There is no more reason to connect the name Paul with the Apostle's baptism than there is to account in the same way for the giving of the name Cephas or Peter, which is due to another cause. In the inscriptions of the Catacombs of Rome and in early Christian literature, the names of Christians in the first three centuries did not distinctively differ from the names of the pagans around them. A reference to the Epistles of St. Paul indicates that the names of pre-Christian gods and goddesses were used by his converts after their conversion as before. Hermes occurs in Romans 16:14, with a number of other purely pagan names, Epaphroditus in Phil. 4:18, Phoebe, the deaconess, in Romans 16:1.

== Change of name at baptism ==
In the Acts of St. Balsamus, who died AD 331, there is an early example of the connection between baptism and the giving of a name. "By my paternal name", this martyr is said to have declared, "I am called Balsamus, but by the spiritual name which I received in baptism, I am known as Peter." The assumption of a new name was fairly common amongst Christians. Eusebius the historian took the name Pamphili from Pamphilus, the martyr whom he especially venerated. Earlier still St. Cyprian chose to be called Cyprianus Caecilius out of gratitude to the Caecilius to whom he owed his conversion. Saint Dionysius of Alexandria (c. 260) declared, "I am of opinion that there were many of the same name as the Apostle John, who on account of their love for him, and because they admired and emulated him, and desired to be loved by the Lord as he was, took to themselves the same name, just as many of the children of the faithful are called Paul or Peter."

The assumption of any such new name would take place formally at baptism, in which the catechumen, then probably as now, had to be addressed by some distinctive appellation, and the imposition of a new name at baptism had become general. Every child had necessarily to receive some name or other, and when baptism followed soon after birth this allowed public recognition of the choice made.

In the thirtieth of the supposed Arabian Canons of Nicaea: "Of giving only names of Christians in baptism"; but the sermons of St. John Chrysostom assume in many different places that the conferring of a name, presumably at baptism, ought to be regulated by some idea of Christian edification, and he implies that such had been the practice of earlier generations. For example, he says: "When it comes to giving the infant a name, caring not to call it after the saints, as the ancients at first did, people light lamps and give them names and so name the child after the one which continues burning the longest, from thence conjecturing that he will live a long time" (Hom. in Cor., xii, 13).

Similarly he commends the practice of the parents of Antioch in calling their children after the martyr Meletius (P.G. 50, 515) and urges his hearers not to give their children the first name that occurs, nor to seek to gratify fathers or grandfathers or other family connections by giving their names, but rather to choose the names of holy men conspicuous for virtue and for their courage before God (P.G. 53, 179). There are other historic examples of such a change of name in adult converts.

Socrates (Hist. Eccl., VII, xxi) wrote of Athenais who married the Emperor Theodosius II, and who previously to marriage was baptized (AD 421) receiving the name Eudoxia.

Bede wrote that King Cædwalla went to Rome and was baptized by the Pope Sergius I who gave him the name of Peter. Dying soon afterwards he was buried in Rome and his epitaph beginning Hic depositus est Caedwalla qui est Petrus was pointed out (Bede, "Hist. Eccl.", V, vii).

Later Guthrum the Danish leader in England after his long contest with King Alfred was eventually defeated, and consenting to accept Christianity was baptized in 878, taking the name Æthelstan.

== Practice regarding names ==
Various Fathers and spiritual writers and synodal decrees have exhorted Christians to give no names to their children in baptism but those of canonized saints or of the angels of God, but at no point in the history of the Church were these injunctions strictly attended to.

They were not observed during the early or the later Middle Ages. In extensive lists of medieval names, such as those found in the indexes of legal proceedings which have been edited in modern times, while ordinary names without religious associations, such as William, Robert, Roger, Geoffrey, Hugh, etc. are common (around the year 1200, William was by far the most common Christian name in England), there are also a number of exceptional names which have apparently no religious associations at all. These include Ademar, Ailma, Ailward, Albreza, Alditha, Almaury, Ascelina, Avice, Aystorius (these come from the lists of those cured at the shrine of St. Thomas of Canterbury). A rubric in the official "Rituale Romanum" mandates that the priest ought to see that names of deities or of godless pagans are not given in baptism (curet ne obscoena, fabulosa aut ridicula vel inanium deorum vel impiorum ethnicorum hominum nomina imponantur).

A pronouncement from Bourges (1666) addressing parents and godparents urges: "Let them give to boys the names of male saints and to girls those of women saints as right order requires, and let them avoid the names of festivals like Easter (Pâques), Christmas (Noël), All Saints (Toussaint) and others that are sometimes chosen." Despite such injunctions "Toussaint" has become a common French Christian name and "Noël" has also found popularity abroad. The addition of Marie, especially in the form Jean-Marie, for boys, and of Josèphe (Marie-Josèphe), for girls, may be found in present-day France.

In Spain and Italy Marian festivals have also created names for girls: Concepción, of which the diminutive is Concha, as well as Asunción, Encarnación, Mercedes, Dolores etc. in Spanish, and in Italian Assunta, Annunziata, Concetta, etc. The name Mary has not always been a favourite for girls. In England in the 12th century, Mary as a Christian name was rare. The name George, often given in recognition of the Saint George the patron saint of England, was not common in the 13th and 14th centuries, though it grew in popularity after the Protestant Reformation.

In the registers of Oxford University from 1560 to 1621, the more common names used by the students in order of popularity were: John, 3826; Thomas, 2777; William, 2546; Richard, 1691; Robert, 1222; Edward, 957; Henry, 908; George, 647; Francis, 447; James, 424; Nicholas, 326; Edmund, 298. In Italy and Spain it has been common practice to call a child after the saint upon whose feast they are born.

== Confirmation names ==
The practice of adopting a new name was not limited to baptism. Many medieval examples show that any notable change of condition, especially in the spiritual order, was often accompanied by the reception of a new name. In the 8th century, the two Englishmen Winfrith and Willibald going on different occasions to Rome received from the Pope, along with a new commission to preach, the names respectively of Boniface and Clement. Emma of Normandy when she married King Ethelred in 1002 took the name Ælfgifu; while the reception of a new, monastic name upon entering a religious order remains almost universal.

At confirmation, in which the interposition of a godfather emphasizes the resemblance with baptism, it has been customary to take a new name, but usually, use made of it is infrequent. In the case of Henry III, King of France, godson of the English Edward VI had been christened Edouard Alexandre in 1551, the same French prince at confirmation received the name of Henri, and subsequently reigned under this name.

In England after the Reformation, the practice of adopting a new name at confirmation was still used, as Sir Edward Coke wrote that a man might validly buy land by his confirmation name, and he recalled the case of a Sir Francis Gawdye, late Chief Justice of the Common Pleas, whose name of baptism was Thomas and his name of confirmation Francis.

== See also ==
- List of biblical names
- Naming ceremony
- Papal name
- Religious name
