= Sancroft International =

British sustainability consultancy company

Sancroft International is a London-based international sustainability consultancy company founded in 1997 and chaired by former UK conservative MP John Gummer, now a member of the House of Lords (Lord Deben). Several other members of the Gummer family are involved in running the business.

Recently published reports have investigated topics including sustainable plastics, energy infrastructure, and modern slavery in public procurement.
