= Harwood Harrison =

British politician

Sir Harwood Harrison Bt

Member of Parliament for Eye
- In office 25 October 1951 – 7 April 1979
- Preceded by: Edgar Granville
- Succeeded by: John Gummer

Personal details
- Born: 6 June 1907 Bugbrooke, Northamptonshire, England
- Died: 11 September 1980 (aged 73) Ipswich, Suffolk, England
- Party: Conservative
- Spouse: Peggy Stenhouse
- Education: Northampton Grammar School; Trinity College, Oxford

Sir James Harwood Harrison, 1st Baronet (6 June 1907 – 11 September 1980) was a British Conservative Party politician. He was the Member of Parliament (MP) for the constituency of Eye in Suffolk from 1951 to 1979, having first contested it in 1950.

Harrison was the eldest son of the Rev'd E W Harrison and E E Tribe of Bugbrooke, Northamptonshire where his family had owned land since the eighteenth century. The family home, Bugbrooke Hall, was later owned by the Jesus Army. He was educated at Northampton Grammar School and Trinity College, Oxford and worked as a company director for a feeding-stuffs manufacturer. He served as an Ipswich Borough Councillor from 1935 to 1946 and served during World War II with The Suffolk Regiment, commanding the 4th Battalion. He was taken prisoner in Singapore and spent time on the Burma Railway.

Harrison won Eye at the 1951 general election, defeating Edgar Granville. He was Harold Macmillan's Parliamentary Private Secretary when Macmillan was Housing Secretary. He served as a Government Whip as a Lord of the Treasury from 8 April 1956 to 16 January 1959, and Comptroller of the Household between 1959 and 1961. He subsequently chaired backbench Conservative committees. He was created a Baronet on 6 July 1961.

On his retirement as MP for Eye at the 1979 general election, the seat was contested by another Conservative, John Gummer, elected with a majority of 27%.

He married Peggy Stenhouse, daughter of Lt Col V D Stenhouse in 1932 and had two children, Sir Michael James Harwood Harrison, 2nd Baronet, and Joanna Kathleen Sanders.

He is buried in the churchyard of St Michael and All Angels', Bugbrooke, Northamptonshire.

Parliament of the United Kingdom
Preceded by Edgar Granville	Member of Parliament for Eye; 1951 – 1979	Succeeded by John Gummer
Political offices
Preceded by Edward Wakefield	Comptroller of the Household; 1959–1961	Succeeded by Robin Chichester-Clark
Baronetage of the United Kingdom
New creation	Baronet (of Bugbrooke); 1961–1980	Succeeded by Michael James Harwood Harrison
