= Joseph Blisset =

Joseph Blisset (fl. 1658–1659), was an English Member of Parliament (MP).

He was a Member of the Parliament of England for Eye 1658–1659.
