= Charles Cornwallis (d. 1675) =

English Member of Parliament (died 1675)

Charles Cornwallis was one of the two MPs for Eye between 1662 and 1675.
