= William Vanneck, 5th Baron Huntingfield =

British Conservative Party politician (1883–1969)

The Right Honourable The Lord Huntingfield KCMG
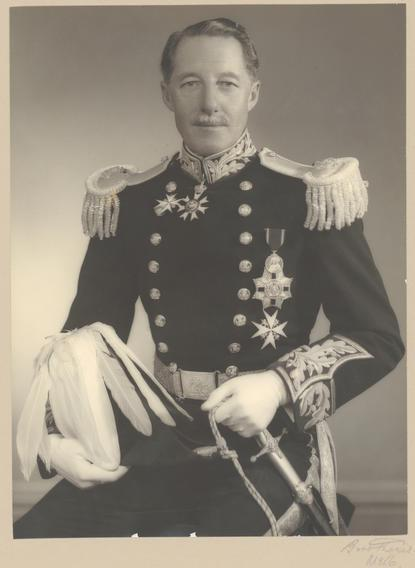

17th Governor of Victoria
- In office 14 May 1934 – 4 April 1939
- Monarchs: George V (1934–1936); Edward VIII (1936); George VI (1936–1939)
- Preceded by: Lord Somers
- Succeeded by: Sir Winston Dugan

Member of Parliament for Eye
- In office 6 December 1923 – 10 May 1929
- Preceded by: Alexander Lyle-Samuel
- Succeeded by: Edgar Granville

Personal details
- Born: 3 January 1883 Gatton, Queensland
- Died: 20 November 1969 (aged 86) Hove, East Sussex, England
- Education: Wellington College

William Charles Arcedeckne Vanneck, 5th Baron Huntingfield, KCMG (3 January 1883 – 20 November 1969) was a British Conservative Party politician, Governor of Victoria, and Administrator of Australia. He was the first Australian-born governor of an Australian state.

== Early life ==
Born in Gatton, Queensland, Vanneck was the son of Hon. William Arcedeckne Vanneck and Mary Armstrong, sister of William Drayton Armstrong (a Member of the Queensland Legislative Assembly and its Speaker for many years). Vanneck grew up near Gatton (now the modern locality of Adare) until he was 14 years old when he went to England. He was educated at Wellington College, Berkshire, whereafter he joined the 13th/18th Hussars, reaching the rank of captain. He succeeded his uncle in 1915 as the 5th Baron Huntingfield of Heveningham Hall and 7th Baronet Vanneck of Putney.

Vanneck married on 21 December 1912 American-born Margaret Eleanor Crosby, the daughter of Ernest Howard Crosby, a descendant of Declaration of Independence signer William Floyd, and Fanny Kendall Schieffelin. From her paternal grandmother Margaret Evertson Givan, Crosby was descendant from Dutch, French Canadian and Scandinavian ancestors who settled in North America.

They had four children:

- Hon. Sara Carola Vanneck (25 September 1913 – 2001), married Major David Arthur Peel in Melbourne, Australia on 14 April 1936. He was a grandson of Arthur Peel, 1st Viscount Peel and died in action in the Second World War in September 1944.
- Gerard Vanneck, 6th Baron Huntingfield (1915–1994)
- Hon. Anne Margaret Theodosia Vanneck (20 May 1918 – 2000), married Peter Moro, the architect, on 2 March 1940 and had issue; divorced in 1984.
- Hon. Sir Peter Vanneck (1922–1999)

== Political career ==
Between 1923 and 1929 Vanneck was member for Eye, Suffolk in the Parliament of the United Kingdom. He was successively Parliamentary Private Secretary to the Parliamentary Under-Secretary of the Home Office 1926–27, and then to the President of the Board of Trade between 1927 and 1928.

== Governorships ==
In 1934 Huntingfield became the Governor of Victoria, Australia, being the first Australian-born governor of an Australian state (although he was always considered British). (Despite this, Victoria was the last of the states to appoint an Australian as governor, Sir Henry Winneke in 1974.) His term expired in 1939. He served as Administrator of Australia between March and September 1938.

Although Vanneck was offered the post of Governor of Southern Rhodesia in 1942, he did not take up the position due to ill health.

== Freemasonry ==
Vanneck was a freemason. He was initiated to the craft in 1919, in the United Lodge No. 1629. He became a member of the United Service Lodge No. 330 in Victoria as a Past Master in 1934. Shortly after that, in 1935, he became Grand Master of the Grand Lodge of Victoria. After his return to England, in 1940, he was appointed Senior Grand Warden of the United Grand Lodge of England.

== Honours and later life ==
Vanneck was invested as a Knight Commander of the Order of St Michael and St George in 1934. He was Colonel of the 58th Battalion, Company of London Home Guard during the Second World War. He was given the rank of Honorary Air Commodore in No. 21 (City of Melbourne) Squadron, Royal Australian Air Force. Finally, he was invested as a Knight of Grace Order of St. John of Jerusalem.

== Arms ==
Coat of arms of William Vanneck, 5th Baron Huntingfield
Crest A bugle horn Gules between two wings elevated Argent tipped Or. Escutcheon Argent three bugle horns two and one Gules stringed Or and in the fess point a torteau. Supporters Two greyhounds Ermine each gorged with a collar paly of six Gules and Or and chained Gold. Motto Droit Et Loyal Orders Order of St.Michael and St.George (Knight Commander - KCMG)

Parliament of the United Kingdom
Preceded by Alexander Lyle-Samuel	Member of Parliament for Eye; 1923–1929	Succeeded by Edgar Granville
Government offices
Preceded by The Lord Somers	Governor of Victoria; 1934–1939	Succeeded by Sir Winston Dugan
Peerage of Ireland
Preceded by Joshua Vanneck	Baron Huntingfield; 1915–1969	Succeeded by Gerard Vanneck
Masonic offices
Preceded by William Kerr	Grand Master of the United Grand Lodge of Victoria; 1935–1939	Succeeded by William Byrne
