= Henry Crofts =

English politician

Sir Henry Crofts (June 1590 – March 1667) was an English politician who sat in the House of Commons at various times between 1624 and 1660.

Crofts was the eldest son of Sir John Crofts of Little Saxham and West Stow and his wife Mary Shirley, daughter of Sir Thomas Shirley of Wiston, Sussex. He was knighted on 3 February 1611. In 1624, he was elected Member of Parliament for Eye. In 1626 he was elected MP for Derby He succeeded his father to his estates in about 1628.

Crofts was a strong Anglican and was not active during the English Civil War although he was named as commissioner of array for Suffolk in 1642. In 1646 the sequestrators required him to surrender a portion of the estate due to his daughter, who had married without her father's consent to Sir Frederick Cornwallis, a Royalist. This was returned when the sequestration was lifted in 1648.

In April 1660, Crofts was elected MP for Bury St Edmunds in the Convention Parliament in a double return, but was seated on the merits of the election. He became J.P. in July 1660 and became Deputy Lieutenant and commissioner for assessment in August 1660, holding all roles until his death.

Crofts died at the age of 77 and was buried at Little Saxham on 31 March 1667.

Crofts married firstly, according to a settlement on 1 November 1610, Elizabeth Wortley, the daughter of Sir Richard Wortley of Wortley, Yorkshire. They had five sons and five daughters. Elizabeth died on 1 October 1643 and he married secondly Margaret and had another son. Margaret died on 26 May 1674.

Three of his sons went into exile with Charles II and the eldest, William, was raised to the peerage in 1658. One son was killed in France in the duel by queen's famous dwarf Jeffrey Hudson on 16 October 1644.

A daughter Elizabeth Crofts married Frederick Cornwallis, 1st Baron Cornwallis in 1643.

His sister Cecilia Crofts married Thomas Killigrew.

Parliament of England
Preceded by Sir Roger North; Sir John Crompton	Member of Parliament for Eye; 1624; With: Francis Finch	Succeeded by Sir Roger North; Francis Finch
Preceded by Timothy Leeving; Edward Leeche	Member of Parliament for Derby; 1626; With: John Thoroughgood	Succeeded by Philip Mainwaring; Timothy Leeving
