= Henry Gawdy =

English politician

Sir Henry Gawdy (c. 1553 – 1621), of Claxton, Norfolk, was an English politician.

Gawdy was the eldest son of Thomas Gawdy and was born around 1553. He was educated at Trinity College, Cambridge and the Inner Temple in 1571.

Gawdy served as a justice of the peace for Suffolk from 1593 and was appointed High Sheriff of Norfolk for 1592–1593 and 1607–1608. He was elected a member of parliament (MP) for Norfolk in 1597 and 1601 and was knighted in 1603.

Gawdy married twice: firstly Elizabeth, the daughter of Robert Warner of Norwich, with whom he had six sons and a daughter, and secondly Elizabeth Barnardiston, widow of Charles Framlingham. He died before 12 March 1621, the date his will was proved.

Parliament of England
Preceded by Edward Coke; Nathaniel Bacon	Member of Parliament for Norfolk; 1597–1604; With: John Townsend 1597–1601; Bassingbourne Gawdy	Succeeded by Nathaniel Bacon; Charles Cornwallis
