= Sir Edward Kerrison, 1st Baronet =

General Sir Edward Kerrison Bt GCH KCB
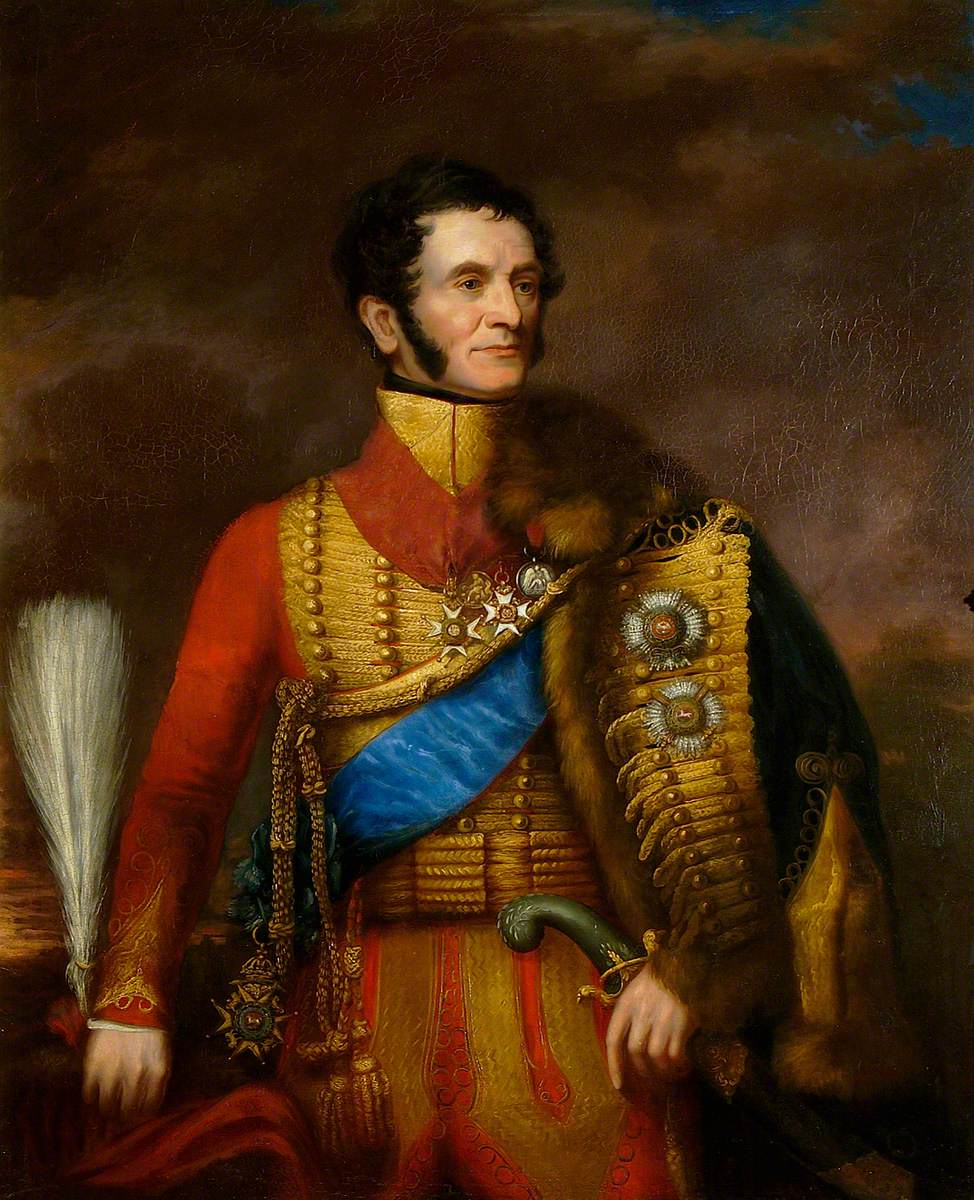
- Portrait by Robert Mendham
- Born: 30 July 1776; Staithe House, Bungay, Suffolk
- Died: 9 March 1853 (aged 76); 13 Great Stanhope Street, London
- Burial place: Hoxne Hall
- Spouse: Mary Ellice (m. 1813–1853)
- Children: 4, including Edward
- Military career
- Allegiance: United Kingdom
- Branch: British Army
- Service years: 1796–1853
- Rank: General
- Commands: 7th Light Dragoons
- Conflicts: French Revolutionary Wars; Anglo-Russian Invasion of Holland; Battle of Bergen; Battle of Alkmaar; Battle of Castricum; Napoleonic Wars; Peninsular War; Battle of Benavente (WIA); Battle of the Nive; Battle of Sauveterre; Battle of Orthez (WIA); Battle of Toulouse; Hundred Days; Battle of Waterloo (WIA); Siege of Cambrai
- Awards: Army Gold Medal; Military General Service Medal

General Sir Edward Kerrison, 1st Baronet, GCH, KCB (30 July 1776 – 9 March 1853) was a British Army officer and politician.

Kerrison was a lieutenant-colonel in the 7th Light Dragoons, saw service during the Peninsular War and commanded his regiment at the Battle of Waterloo.

Along with Charles Wetherell, he petitioned parliament over electoral malpractice in the parliamentary elections for Shaftesbury, Dorset.

Kerrison was the only son of Matthias Kerrison (1742–1827), who was a prosperous merchant and property investor, and his wife, Mary née Barnes. He was born at his father's property, Hoxne Hall, near Bungay, Suffolk, on 30 July 1776.

== Marriage and issue ==
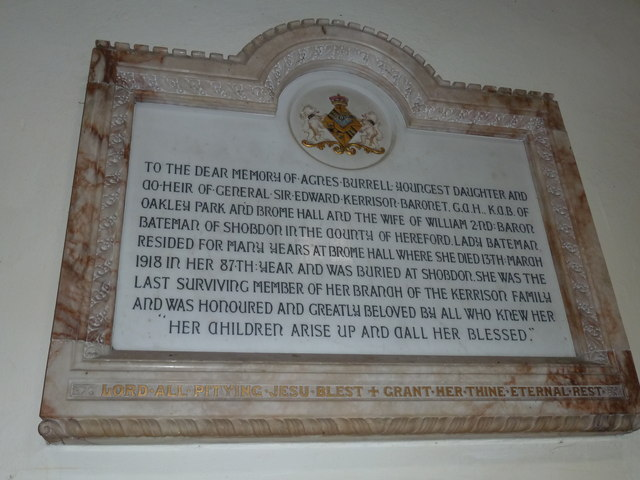
Monument in Hoxne Church to Agnes-Burrell Kerrison (Lady Bateman), youngest daughter and co-heiress of Sir Edward Kerrison and wife of William Bateman-Hanbury, 2nd Baron Bateman, who was "the last surviving member of her branch of the Kerrison family"

At St George's Church, Hanover Square, London, on 20 Oct 1810, Edward Kerrison married Mary Martha Ellice, a daughter of Alexander Ellice, a merchant who had made a fortune in the North American fur trade and transatlantic slave trade. Thus he had as a brother-in-law Edward Ellice, merchant and politician in Earl Grey's government. He had the following issue:

- Sir Edward Kerrison, 2nd Baronet, son and heir;
- Anna Kerrison, who married John Henniker-Major, 4th Baron Henniker in 1836.
- Emily-Harriet Kerrison, who married Philip Stanhope, 5th Earl Stanhope in 1834.
- Agnes-Burrell Kerrison, who married William Bateman-Hanbury, 2nd Baron Bateman on 13 May 1854.

== Notes ==
Parliament of the United Kingdom
Preceded by Richard Bateman-Robson and Hudson Gurney	Member of Parliament for Shaftesbury; 1813–1818; With: Charles Wetherell	Succeeded by John Morritt and Henry Shepherd
Preceded by William Bateman and Earl Compton	Member of Parliament for Northampton; 1818–1820; With: Earl Compton	Succeeded by Sir George Robinson, Bt and William Maberly
Preceded by Sir Robert Gifford and Sir Miles Nightingall	Member of Parliament for Eye; 1824–1852; With: Sir Miles Nightingall to 1829; Philip Sidney 1829–31; William Burge 1831–32 (one member from 1832)	Succeeded by Sir Edward Kerrison, Bt
Baronetage of the United Kingdom
New creation	Baronet (of Hosne and Brome, Co. Suffolk); 1821–1853	Succeeded by Edward Kerrison
