= John Crompton (MP) =

English politician

Sir John Crompton was an English politician who sat in the House of Commons from 1614 to 1622.

Crompton was possibly the son of Sir Thomas Crompton MP for Radnor. He was knighted at Newmarket on 25 March 1608. In 1614, he was elected Member of Parliament for Brecon. He was elected MP for Eye in 1621.

Parliament of England
Preceded by Sir Henry Williams	Member of Parliament for Brecon; 1614	Succeeded by Sir Walter Pye
Preceded by Sir Robert Drury; Huntingdon Colby	Member of Parliament for Eye; 1621–1622; With: Sir Roger North	Succeeded by Sir Henry Crofts; Francis Finch
