= Anthony Gawdy =

Anthony Gawdy (died 1606), of Norwich and Castle Acre, Norfolk, was an English Member of Parliament (MP).

He was a Member of the Parliament of England for Eye in 1597 and 1601. His father, Thomas Gawdy, was MP for Salisbury, Lynn and Norwich. His half=brother, Bassingbourne Gawdy, was also an MP for Eye
