= William Burge =

British politician and lawyer (1786–1849)

William Burge (1786 – 12 November 1849) was a British lawyer and Privy Councillor.

== Biography ==
William Burge matriculated at Wadham College, Oxford in 1803 and was admitted to the Inner Temple being called to the bar in 1808. He then joined the Colonial Service, being stationed to Jamaica, where he served for 12 years as Attorney General. Burge received compensation for slaves he and his wife owned upon the abolition of slavery in the British Empire.

He was involved in a case that was to be overturned by the British Government. Louis Celeste Lecesne and John Escoffery were arrested on 7 October 1823 under the Alien Act by a warrant of the Duke of Manchester, the Governor of Jamaica. They were considered by Burge to be of a dangerous character and to be aliens as they were thought to be Haitians. They had time to raise a writ of Habeas Corpus in the Supreme Court of Jamaica.

The two were later rearrested and exiled. They travelled to London and had the case overturned. In the course of this action Burge wrote a letter (more like a book) which put forward his view and the facts to the Secretary of State for the Colonies, George Murray.

Subsequently, Burge was in practice in London and served as Agent for Jamaica. While claiming to "hate slavery" Burge supported Jamaican Assemblymen who opposed abolition.

He became influential in jurisprudence through his book Commentaries on Colonial and Foreign Laws which went through many editions between 1838 and 1907.

He was Member of Parliament (MP) for Eye from 1831 to 1832. After that borough was reduced to one seat under the Reform Act 1832, he stood at the 1832 general election in Oldham, but did not win a seat.

Burge remained Agent for Jamaica until the position was abolished in 1847. He was then trialed for bankruptcy, 1847-8, and as a result imprisoned until his release on 26 April 1849. He died at home in York Street, London, on 12 November 1849.

== Private life ==
Burge's first wife was from a Jamaican family. Helen Grace Murray Ludford, died in 1839. He was then able to marry Margaret Anne Forbes Alison (1798–1881) in 1841. She was the daughter of the Revd Archibald Alison and Dorothea Gregory.

== Works ==
- Letter to the Right Honorable Sir George Murray Relative to the Deportation of Lecesne and Escoffery from Jamaica], William Burge, 1829
- Commentaries on Colonial and Foreign Laws, 1838 (and new editions to 1907)

Parliament of the United Kingdom
Preceded by Sir Edward Kerrison and Sir Philip Sidney	Member of Parliament for Eye; 1831–1832; With: Sir Edward Kerrison	Succeeded by Sir Edward Kerrison
