= Edgar Granville, Baron Granville of Eye =

British politician

The Right Honourable The Lord Granville of Eye
- Edgar Granville

Member of Parliament for Eye
- In office 30 May 1929 – 5 October 1951
- Preceded by: The Lord Huntingfield
- Succeeded by: Sir James Harwood Harrison

Personal details
- Born: Edgar Louis Granville; 12 February 1898
- Died: 14 February 1998 (aged 100)
- Party: Liberal (until 1931; 1945–1952); Liberal National (1931–1942); Independent (1942–1945; 1970s–1998); Labour (1952–1970s)
- Occupation: Politician

Military service
- Allegiance: Australia; United Kingdom
- Branch/service: Australian Army; British Army (1939–1940)
- Unit: First Australian Imperial Force (Australian Light Horse); Royal Artillery
- Battles/wars: World War I

Edgar Louis Granville, Baron Granville of Eye (12 February 1898 – 14 February 1998) was a British politician.

Edgar Granville was born in Reading, the son of Reginald and Margaret Granville. His year of birth is sometimes incorrectly given as 1899, but his birth record states the actual year as 1898 (according to The Times, it was only the delivery of a telegram from Buckingham Palace on his 100th birthday that confirmed he was "a year older than had generally been thought"). He was educated in High Wycombe and in Australia, where he lived for some years. He served in the First World War with the Australian Imperial Force in Gallipoli, Egypt, and France. He was a scout with the Australian Light Horse and was wounded with the 4th Light Horse at Gallipoli. He was later president of the Gallipoli Association.

Granville was elected as Liberal Member of Parliament (MP) for Eye in Suffolk in 1929. He played a wide role within the Liberal Party, becoming at various stages chair of their Agricultural Group, secretary of the Foreign Affairs Group and vice-president of the Young Liberals. Becoming a Liberal National for the 1931 general election, he served as Parliamentary Private Secretary to then Home Secretary, Sir Herbert Samuel, then to Sir John Simon, Foreign Secretary, in the National Governments of the 1930s.

Granville served in the Royal Artillery as an officer in the Second World War, resigning his commission in August 1940. In 1942, he left the Liberal Nationals to form a "People's Movement" with his fellow MP Captain Alec Cunningham-Reid, who had been deprived of the Conservative Party whip after campaigning for the Independent candidate W. J. Brown in the Rugby by-election earlier that year. Attempts at popularising the Movement quickly foundered, however, and after three years sitting as an Independent Granville rejoined the Liberals in 1945. He stood for the party in Eye in that year's general election, facing both Conservative and Labour opposition, and managed to scrape out a win by 949 votes. He won again in 1950 with an even smaller majority – 627 – but could not overcome the Conservatives in the 1951 election and lost his seat.

In 1952 Granville joined the Labour Party, and stood once again for Eye in 1955, losing by just 898 votes despite the fact that Labour had previously been a distant third. He was elevated to the House of Lords as a life peer on 12 September 1967, with the title Baron Granville of Eye, of Eye in the County of Suffolk. Initially sitting as a Labour member, in the 1970s he moved to the crossbenches. He later swung even further rightwards, reportedly describing Margaret Thatcher as "the best Prime Minister since Churchill." He is one of the few peers to have celebrated their 100th birthday, although he died just two days later.

He was managing director of E. L. Granville & Co. Ltd, chair and furniture manufacturers, of High Wycombe. He also wrote two novels, The Peking Pigeon and The Domino Plan (1975).

He was survived by his wife Elizabeth and a daughter, Linda Gounalakis.

Coat of arms of Edgar Granville, Baron Granville of Eye

Crest
In front of a mount Vert thereon a beech tree Proper a chaplet of roses Argent barbed and seeded Proper.
Escutcheon
Tierced in pairle Vert Purpure and Azure in chief two sea gulls volant Proper and in base a sun in splendour charged with an eye and on a bordure Or eight beech leaves Proper in aestival and autumnal tints alternately.
Supporters
Dexter a bay horse, sinister a kangaroo, Proper.
Motto
Pariter Opus Perseverantia

== Bibliography ==
- Entry by Dr Malcolm Baines in Dictionary of Liberal Biography, Brack et al. (eds.), Politico's (1998)

Parliament of the United Kingdom
Preceded by The Lord Huntingfield	Member for Eye; 1929–1951	Succeeded by Sir James Harwood Harrison
