= Alexander Lyle-Samuel =

British politician

Alexander Lyle-Samuel (10 August 1883 – 19 November 1942) was a businessman from Birmingham and Liberal member of the House of Commons. He represented the constituency of Eye in East Suffolk from 1918 until 1923 and was involved in a difficult court case when he was forced to defend himself against a series of allegations made by a defeated political opponent.

== Family and education ==
Lyle-Samuel was the son of the Reverend George Samuel, a Baptist Minister of Christ Church, Aston in Birmingham. He was educated at King Edward's School, Birmingham and Trinity Hall, Cambridge. He married his first wife Eva, a lady from Antigua in 1906. For whatever reason, this marriage was not a happy one, with financial difficulties causing the couple to separate. Eva Samuel also suffered with mental health problems and died in what was described in reports of the day as a 'pauper lunatic asylum'. Lyle-Samuel assumed the additional name of Lyle by deed poll upon his second marriage with Julia G. Lyle of Springwood, Tenafly, New Jersey. Mrs Lyle had apparently been a nurse at a New York hospital where she had cared for an elderly millionaire. They married and Mrs Lyle soon became a rich widow. Lyle-Samuel had three children. One son, Winstone, died in a bobsleighing accident at St. Moritz in 1929 aged 23.

== Career ==
At the age of 15, in 1898, Lyle-Samuel started work as a clerk at Lloyds Bank. He remained with the bank until 1902. He was then employed as assistant organizer to a temperance movement at the City Temple. However he worked there for only a few months and then returned to Birmingham where he was employed on two newspapers until 1905. He then went into business first opening a hotel bureau and later began publication of a women's magazine but both these enterprises failed.

Lyle-Samuel had ambitions to be a lawyer and studied law at Cambridge. He was admitted to the Middle Temple in January 1908. He travelled extensively in America, residing there from 1913–15. He returned to Britain to serve in the First World War but was several times rejected for service. However he was later accepted and served as a Lieutenant until 1917, when he was invalided out. The following year Lyle-Samuel was appointed as Hon Secretary of the English Speaking Union soon after its establishment in 1918.

== Politics ==
=== 1918 general election ===
Lyle-Samuel was adopted as Liberal candidate for the Eye constituency of East Suffolk. The campaign in Eye was obviously difficult. Lyle-Samuel was first nominated as a Liberal against Colonel F W French who was described as a Coalition Conservative. However just a couple of weeks later, French seems to have lost his Coalition backing and was being described in the national press as an Independent Conservative. Lyle-Samuel then picked up the Coalition mantel and held the seat for the Liberals, beating French in a straight fight by a majority of 3,710 votes and 61% of the poll.

=== 1922 general election ===
At the 1922 general election Lyle-Samuel stood as an Independent Liberal, not associating himself with the National Liberal organisation that Lloyd George had set up, first to support his Coalition government with Conservatives and then to contest the 1922 general election once the Coalition had fallen. In fact Lyle-Samuel was involved in a straight fight with a National Liberal, Stephen Howard, who was presumably supported, if only tacitly, by the Conservatives in Eye. It is not clear exactly when or why Lyle-Samuel fell out with the Coalition Liberals, although it was reported that his speech in Parliament in June 1921 objecting to the Safeguarding of Industries Bill, an anti-Free Trade measure, delighted Independent Liberals. He held his seat with a majority of 3,531.

=== Political stance and main appointments ===
Lyle-Samuel described himself more than once in Parliament as a classical Liberal free-trader. He was also a supporter of the traditional policy of Irish Home Rule. He was elected as Master of the Worshipful Company of Glass Sellers in 1922. In Parliament, he was appointed in 1923 to serve as a member of the Select Committee on the Taxation of Bets.

=== 1923 general election ===
Lyle-Samuel contested Eye again at the 1923 general election. This time he faced a three-cornered fight against Conservative and Labour opponents, giving the Tories hope that they would gain the seat. Lyle-Samuel had by this time built a reputation as a respected local MP but his Unionist challenger was also a popular character. Lord Huntingfield, holder of an Irish peerage, was a well-known county figure. Generations of his family had resided at Heveningham Hall, Saxmundham and farmed around 700 acres (2.8 km^{2}) in the area, which made him attractive to the agricultural community. He was also known as a good public speaker. The Liberal Party nationally, reunited after the splits in the party between the supporters of Lloyd George and H H Asquith since 1916, and fighting on the traditional Liberal policy of Free Trade, made a revival at the 1923 general election. However the intervention of a Labour candidate muddied the political waters in Eye and Lord Huntingfield took the seat from Lyle-Samuel by a majority of 1,928 votes with Labour man, C W Kendall, in third place with 2,984 votes.

=== Later political contests ===
Lyle-Samuel seems to have been in uncertain health. It was noted in the press over the years that he had been advised by doctors to take breaks for the sake of his health and in March 1924 he was reported to have been ordered abroad by his medical adviser. As a result, he told the Eye Liberals that he was reluctantly compelled to withdraw as their candidate. However by the time of the 1924 general election his health had recovered sufficiently for him to stand as a candidate again elsewhere. At first he was selected to fight the seat of Crewe in Cheshire. Crewe had a mostly Liberal tradition up to the time of the 1922 general election when it narrowly went Labour. In 1923 the Conservatives made it a three-cornered contest and the Liberal candidate fell to the bottom of the poll. This may have been a contest therefore which Lyle-Samuel felt required only his name but in the event he withdrew as Liberal candidate leaving the election as a straight fight between the sitting Labour MP Edward Hemmerde and his Tory opponent Ernest Craig, from which Craig emerged the victor.

Lyle-Samuel switched his political interest to the seat of Grantham, Lincolnshire. Grantham had had a Liberal MP as recently as 1922 but like Eye the seat had been lost to the Tories at the 1923 general election against the national trend. In a three-cornered contest, Lyle-Samuel held second place for the Liberals but the share of the vote declined. He did not stand for Parliament again.

== Court case of 1919–1920 ==
The political fight in Eye at the 1918 general election was clearly contested with a ferocious degree of intensity. During the campaign Lyle-Samuel was the subject of a number of allegations which went beyond the usual cut and thrust of democratic politics. Consequently, as a result of unspecified but allegedly scandalous allegations against him, Lyle-Samuel had issued writs against the National News and against both his Conservative opponent, Colonel French and his agent, Mr Alfred Pretty. The accusations against the National News later surfaced in court. Lyle-Samuel complained that the paper had reported that he had married his first wife solely for her money, that he had then tricked her of her money, deserted her, driven her mad and left her to die in a lunatic asylum (sic). It was also alleged that he had married his second wife also for her money and that he had then engaged in a company promoting transactions of a dishonest character. The newspaper had relied on an unnamed informant to source their story and the legal precedents of the day gave the papers a lot of leeway as to how far they were required to verify such disclosures. In a judgment which made it plain that the newspaper probably should have checked the source more closely, the judges in the Court of Appeal nevertheless found that they had not acted outside the law and dismissed Lyle-Samuel's appeal. Lyle-Samuel appealed again to the High Court.

The case came back to court in December 1919, the Lord Chief Justice hearing the matter sitting with a special jury. The judgment of the Lord Chief Justice was that the defendants had had no evidence to substantiate their allegations against Lyle-Samuel or to claim that was unfit to be a Member of Parliament. He also found that French and Pretty had made no effort to enquire into the truth of the charges they had heard against Lyle-Samuel before arranging for them to be published in the press. The jury found for Lyle-Samuel, awarding damages in the sum of £500. However one of the jurors wished it to be recorded that he had had great difficulty arriving at a verdict. The office of the Lord Chief Justice was at the time of trial held by Lord Reading. Reading was a former Liberal MP and Cabinet Minister, close to Prime Minister David Lloyd George. There is no evidence that he approached the Lyle-Samuel case, the action of a political colleague, with anything other than the proper judicial detachment. The publishers, who were by now in different ownership than at the time of publication, later withdrew their pleas of justification, i.e. their claim that what they had published was true and agreed to pay Lyle-Samuel £525 to cover costs.

== Later life ==
Lyle-Samuel's fortunes did not improve after he left Parliament. He had always had close connections with the USA and he now went to live in New York City. In 1928 debts he had built up in Britain got so large that his affairs were put into the hands of the Official Receiver. At this time he was described as residing at a hotel on East 54th Street and of being without occupation or in possession of any assets in Britain. As noted above, his personal life was also filled with tragedy when his son, Winstone, was involved in a bobsleighing accident in Switzerland and died of his injuries at the age of 23 years.

Lyle-Samuel died in New York in 1942, aged 59.

Parliament of the United Kingdom
| Preceded by Weetman Harold Miller Pearson | Member of Parliament for Eye; 1918–1923 | Succeeded by William Vanneck |
