= Richard Bedell =

Richard Bedell (died 1572), of Leighton, Huntingdonshire, was an English Member of Parliament (MP).

He was a Member of the Parliament of England for Eye in 1571 and Weymouth and Melcombe Regis in 1572.
