= 1874 Eye by-election =

UK Parliamentary by-election

The 1874 Eye by-election was fought on 17 March 1874. The by-election was fought due to the incumbent Conservative MP, George Barrington, becoming Vice-Chamberlain of the Household. It was retained by the incumbent.

Eye by-election, 1874
Party	Candidate	Votes	%	±%
Conservative	George Barrington	656	62.9	N/A
Liberal	L Easton	386	37.0	New
Majority		270	25.9	N/A
Turnout		1,042	89.6	N/A
Conservative hold		Swing	N/A	
