= John Gummer =

British politician (born 1939)

The Right Honourable The Lord Deben PC FRASE
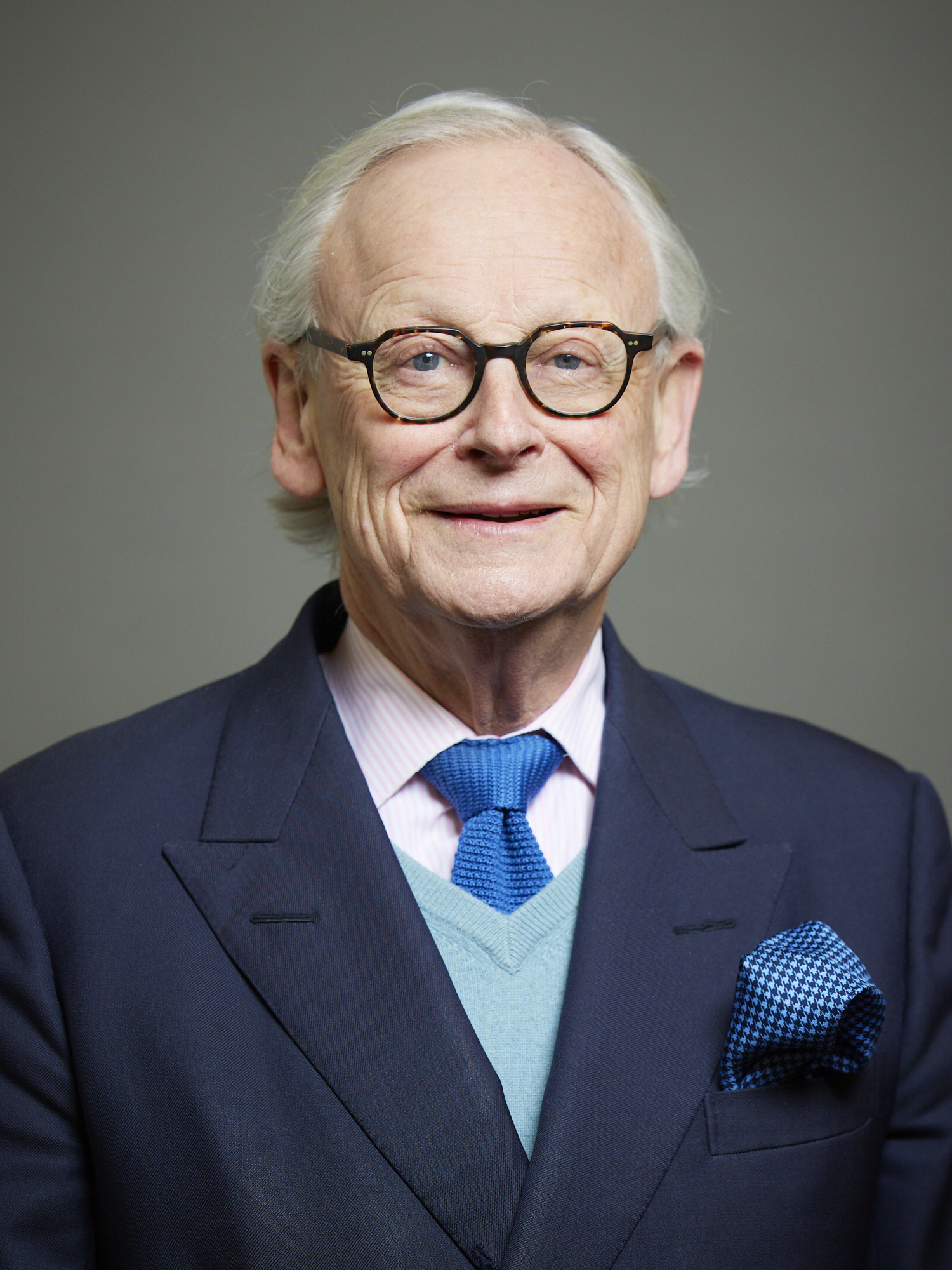
- Official portrait, 2023

Chairman, Climate Change Committee
- In office 2012–2023
- Preceded by: Adair Turner, Baron Turner of Ecchinswell
- Succeeded by: Piers Forster

Shadow Secretary of State for the Environment
- In office 2 May 1997 – 11 June 1997
- Leader: John Major
- Preceded by: Frank Dobson
- Succeeded by: Norman Fowler (Environment, Transport and the Regions)

Secretary of State for the Environment
- In office 27 May 1993 – 2 May 1997
- Prime Minister: John Major
- Preceded by: Michael Howard
- Succeeded by: John Prescott (Environment, Transport and the Regions)

Minister of Agriculture, Fisheries and Food
- In office 24 July 1989 – 27 May 1993
- Prime Minister: Margaret Thatcher; John Major
- Preceded by: John MacGregor
- Succeeded by: Gillian Shephard

Paymaster General
- In office 11 September 1984 – 1 September 1985
- Prime Minister: Margaret Thatcher
- Preceded by: Cecil Parkinson
- Succeeded by: Kenneth Clarke

Chairman of the Conservative Party
- In office 11 June 1983 – 2 September 1985
- Leader: Margaret Thatcher
- Preceded by: Cecil Parkinson
- Succeeded by: Norman Tebbit

Member of the House of Lords
- Lord Temporal
- Life peerage 21 June 2010

Member of Parliament
- In office 3 May 1979 – 12 April 2010
- Preceded by: Harwood Harrison
- Succeeded by: Thérèse Coffey
- Constituency: Eye (1979–1983); Suffolk Coastal (1983–2010)
- In office 18 June 1970 – 8 February 1974
- Preceded by: James Dickens
- Succeeded by: Christopher Price
- Constituency: Lewisham West

Personal details
- Born: 26 November 1939 (age 86) Stockport, Cheshire, England
- Party: Conservative
- Spouse: Penelope Gardner
- Children: 4, including Ben
- Relatives: Peter Gummer (brother)
- Education: Selwyn College, Cambridge

John Selwyn Gummer, Baron Deben, PC FRASE (born 26 November 1939) is a British Conservative Party politician, formerly the Member of Parliament (MP) for Suffolk Coastal and Lewisham West, now a member of the House of Lords. He was Chairman of the Conservative Party from 1983 to 1985 and held various government posts including Secretary of State for the Environment from 1993 to 1997.

Gummer stood down from the House of Commons at the 2010 general election and was appointed to the House of Lords as Lord Deben.

Lord Deben was Chairman of the UK's independent Climate Change Committee. He also chairs the sustainability consultancy Sancroft International, recycler Valpak, and PIMFA (Personal Investment & Financial Advice Association). He is a director of The Catholic Herald and the Castle Trust – a mortgage and investment firm. He is a trustee of climate change charity Cool Earth, alongside the ocean conservation charity, Blue Marine Foundation.

== Early life ==
Gummer was born in Stockport, Cheshire. He is the eldest son of a Church of England priest, Canon Selwyn Gummer, and his younger brother is Peter Gummer, Baron Chadlington, a PR professional.

After being educated at King's School, Rochester, Gummer studied history at Selwyn College, Cambridge. Whilst there, as chairman of the Cambridge University Conservative Association and later president of the Cambridge Union Society, he was a member of what became known as the Cambridge Mafia – a group of future Conservative Cabinet ministers, including Leon Brittan, Michael Howard, Kenneth Clarke, Norman Lamont, and Norman Fowler.

== Public life ==
=== Elections ===
First elected to Parliament at the 1970 general election, in which he defeated sitting MP James Dickens in Lewisham West, Gummer had previously contested Greenwich in 1964 and 1966. He was unseated in February 1974 by Labour's Christopher Price – who achieved a 3.4% swing compared with a 1.3% swing to Labour nationally – and decided not to stand for the seat in the second election that year.

In 1979, he returned to the House of Commons, securing Eye in Suffolk, following the retirement of veteran Tory MP Harwood Harrison. He held the constituency and its successor Suffolk Coastal until his retirement from the Commons in 2010.

=== In government ===
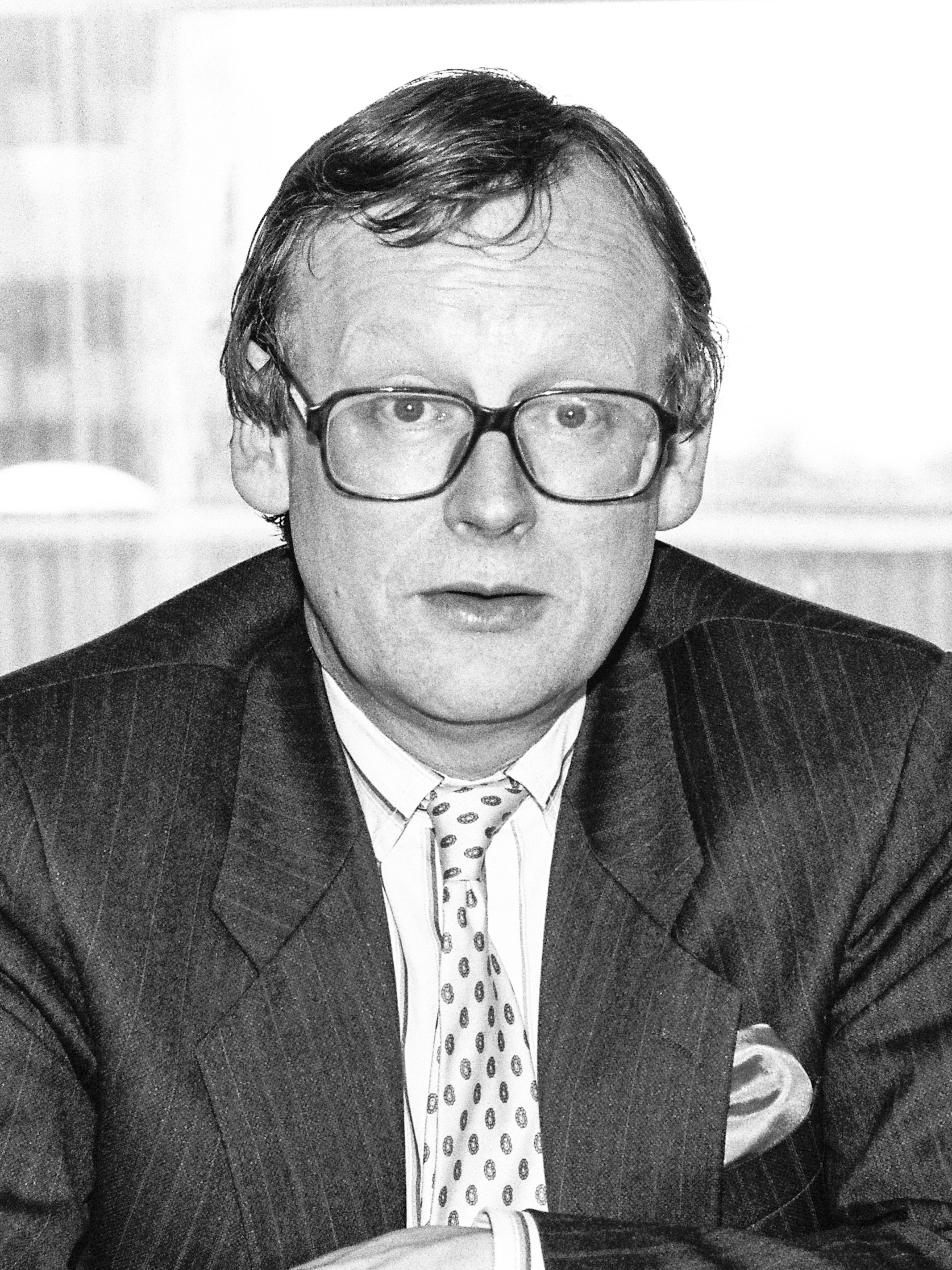
Gummer in 1991

Gummer was Parliamentary Private Secretary to the minister of agriculture in Edward Heath's government, before being appointed Conservative Party Vice-Chairman – a position he held until the government's fall in 1974. Following his return to the House in the 1979 election, he held various government posts and was Conservative Party Chairman from 1983 to 1985 – an office he held at the time of the Brighton hotel bombing during the 1984 Conservative Party conference. He joined the Cabinet in 1989 as Minister of Agriculture, Fisheries and Food, moving to become Secretary of State for the Environment under John Major in 1993.

As environment secretary he introduced the Environment Act 1995 and the Landfill Tax, which was the first such environmental tax in the UK. The BBC Wildlife magazine described Gummer as the "Environment Secretary against which all others are judged", placing him as one of its top ten environmental heroes. In 1997, he was also awarded the Royal Society for the Protection of Birds Medal, and was described by Friends of the Earth as "the best Environment Secretary we've ever had".

He had responsibility for food safety during the mad cow disease epidemic in 1989–90 which eventually claimed 178 British lives. At the height of the crisis in May 1990, he attempted to refute the growing evidence for BSE/Creutzfeldt–Jakob disease by offering his four-year-old daughter Cordelia a burger in front of press cameras, which she declined but he consumed during a constituency event.

Gummer opposed the reduction of beds at the Aldeburgh Cottage Hospital in July 2005.

=== In opposition ===
Gummer managed to retain his seat in the 1997 Labour landslide victory, albeit with a much-reduced majority of 3,254. He subsequently became a backbencher and chairman of the All-Party Group on Architecture and Planning. During this time he pursued environmental causes, introducing an Early Day Motion on global warming to Parliament along with Michael Meacher and Norman Baker. He was also instrumental in the passing of the Climate Change Act 2008.

Because of his environmental credentials, in 2005 David Cameron asked Gummer to chair the Quality of Life Policy Group with Zac Goldsmith as his deputy.

In 2009, Gummer was involved in the United Kingdom parliamentary expenses scandal, after claiming £36,000 for gardening over four years, as a parliamentary expense. Although the claims were encouraged and initially approved by the Parliamentary Fees Office, rules state claims should only be made on expenses essential to parliamentary duties. He repaid £11,538 for gardening and household bills and donated £11,500 to charity, saying that he was paying above the minimum required in order to demonstrate "corporate social responsibility" for the expenses system. Subsequently, the Legg Report showed that 343 MPs had been asked to repay some money with Gummer paying the seventh highest figure.

=== House of Lords ===
It was announced that Gummer would be awarded a peerage in the 2010 Dissolution Honours List. On 21 June he was created a Life Peer as Baron Deben, of Winston in the County of Suffolk. He takes his title from the River Deben. He was introduced in the House of Lords the same day, supported by his brother, Lord Chadlington, and the composer Lord Lloyd-Webber.

As a pro-European moderate, Lord Deben supported Kenneth Clarke's leadership bids.

In September 2012, Lord Deben was confirmed as Chairman of the UK's independent Committee on Climate Change, succeeding Lord Turner. The committee advises the UK Government on setting and meeting carbon budgets and on preparing for the impacts of climate change. He was due to step down at the end of June 2023.

== Personal life ==
Lord Deben has been married to Penelope Gardner since 1977, and lives at Winston Grange, a Grade II–listed property in Stowmarket, Suffolk. They have four children, including Ben Gummer, who was MP for Ipswich from 2010, until he lost his seat in 2017.

He converted to the Catholic Church in 1992, having previously been a practising Anglican and a member of the General Synod of the Church of England. He has supported the creation of the Personal Ordinariate of Our Lady of Walsingham for former Anglicans who have, like him, joined the Catholic Church, including serving as an honorary vice-president of the Friends of the Personal Ordinariate of Our Lady of Walsingham. In July 2018 he was awarded the honorary degree of Doctor of Science (D.Sc.) from the University of East Anglia.

== Arms ==
Coat of arms of John Gummer
Crest A cock wings elevated and addorsed Or beaked and combed jelloped and legged Gules grasping in the dexter claws a lily of the valley Argent slipped and leaved Or. Escutcheon Gules a cross potent nowy quadrate Argent between four escallops fukes inwards Or. Motto Duc In Altum (Put Out Into The Deep)

== See also ==
- River Deben

== Bibliography ==
- 1966: When the Coloured People Come, by John Gummer, Oldbourne, ISBN 0-356-01199-2
- 1969: To Church with Enthusiasm, by John Gummer
- 1971: The Permissive Society: Fact or Fantasy?, by John Selwyn Gummer, Cassell, ISBN 0-304-93821-1
- 1974: The Christian Calendar, by Leonard W. Cowie and John Selwyn Gummer, Weidenfeld & Nicolson, ISBN 0-297-76804-2
- 1987: Faith in Politics: Which Way Should Christians Vote?, by John Gummer, Society for Promoting Christian Knowledge, ISBN 0-281-04299-3
- 1990: Christianity and Conservatism, by John Gummer
- 1997: Green Buildings Pay, edited by B. W. Edwards, foreword by John Gummer, Spon Press, ISBN 0-419-22730-X
- 1998: From Earth Summit to Local Agenda 21: Working Towards Sustainable Development, edited by William Laffery, Katarina Eckerberg, William M. Laffery, foreword by John Gummer, Earthscan Publications, ISBN 1-85383-547-1
- 1998: Precision Agriculture: Practical Applications of New Technologies, by John Gummer and Peter Botschek, The International Fertiliser Society, ISBN 0-85310-062-4
- Weekly columnist in Estates Gazette magazine

Parliament of the United Kingdom
Preceded by James Dickens	Member of Parliament for Lewisham West; 1970 – February 1974	Succeeded by Christopher Price
Preceded by Harwood Harrison	Member of Parliament for Eye; 1979–1983	Constituency abolished
New constituency	Member of Parliament for Suffolk Coastal; 1983–2010	Succeeded by Thérèse Coffey
Political offices
Preceded by Cecil Parkinson	Chairman of the Conservative Party; 1983–1985	Succeeded by Norman Tebbit
Preceded by Cecil Parkinson	Paymaster General; 1984–1985	Succeeded by Kenneth Clarke
Preceded by John MacGregor	Minister of State for Agriculture, Fisheries and Food; 1989–1993	Succeeded by Gillian Shephard
Preceded by Michael Howard	Secretary of State for the Environment; 1993–1997	Succeeded by John Prescott as Secretary of State for the Environment, Transport and the Regions
Orders of precedence in the United Kingdom
Preceded by The Lord Liddle	Gentlemen; Baron Deben	Followed by The Lord Kennedy of Southwark
