= Francis Gawdy =

English judge

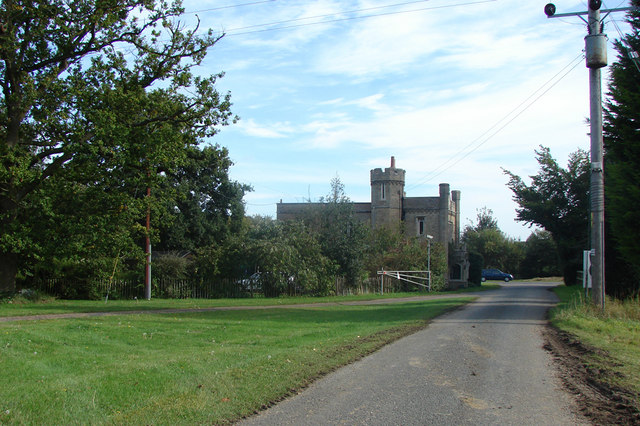
The gatehouse of Wallington Hall in Norfolk. Gawdy's wife inherited the hall which today is in a 580-acre estate.

Sir Francis Gawdy (died 15 December 1605) was an English judge. He was a Justice of the King's Bench, and Chief Justice of the Common Pleas. His country seat and estates were in Norfolk.

== Career ==
=== Family and name ===
Gawdy was the third son of Thomas Gawdy, and was baptised Thomas Gawdy, as were his two elder half-brothers, Thomas Gawdy (d.1556) and Thomas Gawdy (d.1588). Francis then had his name changed at his confirmation, establishing legal precedent that a name given at baptism could be changed at confirmation.

=== Legal education and progress ===
Gawdy may have studied at Trinity Hall, Cambridge, matriculating in 1545, but this might be Francis's half-brother, the Thomas Gawdy who died in 1588. He was called to the bar at Inner Temple in 1549, becoming a bencher in 1558 and treasurer in 1571. He was reader at Lyon's Inn in 1561 and at the Inner Temple in 1566 and 1571. He had an unremarkable parliamentary career, elected to represent Morpeth for the 1571 election, but focused mainly on his legal career. He was made Serjeant-at-law in 1577 and Queen's Serjeant in 1582, and as Queen's Serjeant opened the prosecution against Mary, Queen of Scots.

=== Marriage and estates ===
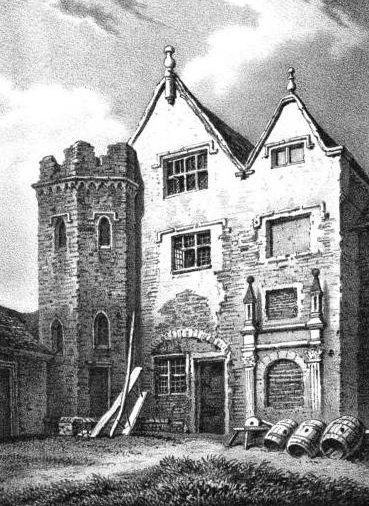
Fincham Hall – one of the Norfolk houses Gawdy possessed.

In 1563 Gawdy married Elizabeth, daughter of Christopher Coningsby. Through this marriage he also obtained Fincham Hall (Fincham, Norfolk) and Wallington Hall (Runcton Holme, Norfolk), which had belonged to Elizabeth's father, Christopher Coningsby, the son of William Coningsby. Coningsby had been the Recorder in King's Lynn.

=== Later career ===
Gawdy succeeded his elder brother, the middle Thomas Gawdy, as a justice of the King's Bench in 1588. With John Clench, Francis Wyndham and William Peryam, he was one of the four justices appointed to hear causes in Chancery in the six months which intervened between the death of his kinsman the Lord Chancellor, Christopher Hatton (20 November 1591), and the appointment of his successor, John Puckering.

Gawdy took part in many of the major trials of this period, including that of Sir Walter Raleigh in 1603, and Gawdy was knighted the same year. Gawdy apparently expected to succeed William Peryam as Lord Chief Baron of the Exchequer, but James I informed him he was being saved for a more senior position when it became available, and appointed Thomas Fleming to that position instead.

=== Raising his granddaughter ===
The sole issue of Gawdy's marriage was his daughter Elizabeth. In 1589, at Holdenby, she married William Newport (a nephew and heir of Hatton's), who changed his name to William Hatton (1560–1597): it was an occasion upon which Christopher Hatton demonstrated his celebrated predilection for dancing. Elizabeth died during her father's lifetime leaving no male issue, but an only daughter, Frances (1590–1623), who was brought up by Gawdy.

In February 1605, without her grandfather's approval, Frances was married to Robert Rich, who became Earl of Warwick in 1619, and after this marriage Gawdy broke off relations between himself and his granddaughter.

In August 1605, Gawdy was appointed Chief Justice of the Common Pleas, a position he did not live to enjoy, dying of apoplexy on 15 December at Serjeant's Inn.

=== Death and burial ===
After his death, Gawdy's body was brought from London to Wallington; it is said that they could find no place to bury his body as he was refused space locally. (Gawdy had depopulated the town around his hall and converted the church to a dog kennel or hay store.) As the smell of the body became offensive, he was eventually buried without ceremony at North Runcton church, and only paving stones were used to cover the grave. The parish register at North Runcton records that he was buried in the chancel by the local parson on 27 February.

Legal offices
Preceded by Sir Edmund Anderson	Chief Justice of the Common Pleas; 1605	Succeeded by Sir Edward Coke
Parliament of England
Preceded by Unknown	Member of Parliament for Morpeth; 1571	Succeeded by Unknown
