= Thomas Gawdy (died 1588) =

English politician and justice

Sir Thomas Gawdy SL (died 5 November 1588) was an English justice and Member of Parliament. He was a member of the Norfolk family of Gawdy (or Gaudy), of whom many were lawyers during the 16th and 17th centuries. He was Recorder of Norwich for 16 years. His seat was at Gawdy Hall, Harleston, a grand mansion which, in its final state, was demolished in 1939.

== Career ==
=== Family and name ===
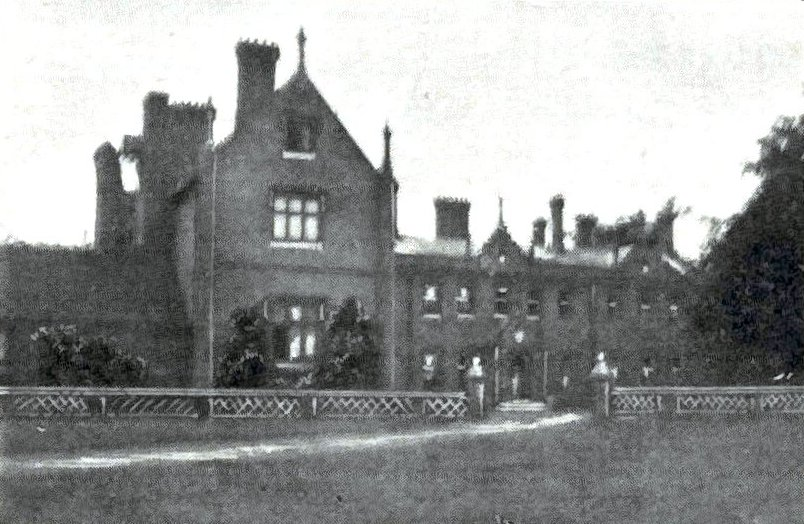
Gawdy Hall, the family home, which Thomas bought from relatives in 1567

He was the second of three sons of Thomas Gawdy, all by different wives and all baptised Thomas. (The younger half-brother changed his name to Francis Gawdy, at his confirmation). The mother of this Thomas was Anne Bennett. All three brothers were lawyers. His elder half-brother Thomas Gawdy was created a Serjeant-at-law in 1552 before dying in 1556, whereas his younger brother, Francis, served as Chief Justice of the Common Pleas from August 1605 until December of that year.

=== Legal profession ===
A member of the Inner Temple, Thomas was called to the bar in 1550, appointed a reader of his Inn in 1560 and treasurer in 1562. He was issued a writ to be called as a Serjeant-at-law in October 1558, but it lapsed on the death of Mary I. He was excluded from the list of Elizabeth I, possibly on his own request, but was renominated in 1567. In 1574 he was made a justice of the Court of King's Bench and in 1578 he was knighted.

As a lawyer Gawdy made much of his connections in East Anglia; at a young age he had come under the patronage of the Earl of Arundel, representing him in Parliament as the member for Arundel in 1553. However, the main focus of his activities was the city of Norwich, for which he sat in Parliament, as the member for Norwich, in 1557 and served as Recorder between 1558 and 1574.

=== Marriages and property ===
In 1548, he married Etheldreda or Audrey, daughter of William Knightley of Norwich. Her dowry and property was used to expand his own land. A year after she died in 1566 he married Frances Richers, and used the money from that marriage to buy more land and property, including Gawdy Hall (Harleston), the family seat, and land at Redenhall and Harleston. He died at Gawdy Hall on 5 November 1588, and was buried at Redenhall Church.

=== Children ===
By his first wife he had issue two sons:

- Henry Gawdy, who survived him, was high sheriff of Norfolk in 1593, and was created a Knight of the Bath by James I in 1603. Many letters of Sir Henry Gawdy to his cousin Sir Bassingbourne and others are calendared in the report on the Gawdy MSS. issued by the Historical Manuscripts Commission
- Thomas Gawdy, who matriculated from Trinity Hall, Cambridge Easter 1571, and married Anne Bushell

The judge also left three daughters,

- Frances Gawdy. Frances married Sir Edmund Moundeford of Mundford and Hockwold, Norfolk, the grandson of Francis Mountford, and was the mother of Sir Edmund Moundeford
- Isabell Gawdy
- Julian Gawdy. Juliana (d.1673) married Sir Richard Berney, Sheriff of Norfolk in 1610, and was the mother of Sir Richard Berney, 1st Baronet

Parliament of England
Preceded by Unknown	Member of Parliament for Norwich; 1557	Succeeded by Unknown
