= Ken Nightingall =

British sound engineer

Ken Nightingall (1928 – 19 May 2020) was a British sound engineer, popularly known as Pink Shorts Boom Guy after an image surfaced in 2015 of him working as a boom operator on Star Wars in 1976 wearing only pink shorts. He had a long career in the film industry, including many James Bond films, and was part of the sound team that won the Academy Award for Best Sound and the BAFTA Award for Best Sound for Star Wars.

== Career ==
Ken Nightingall was born in 1928. Over his career, he worked on over 47 films. Among these are the James Bond films For Your Eyes Only (1981), Octopussy (1983), A View to a Kill (1985) and The Living Daylights (1987), as well as other popular films like Alfie (1966), Funeral in Berlin (1966), The Boys from Brazil (1978) and Supergirl (1984). He also worked in television, for shows such as Top Secret.

His career began in generally low-budget British films, including The Deadly Bees, which went on to become a classic Mystery Science Theater 3000 parody. In his early works he was normally uncredited, but built a steady reputation for being a consistently high-quality boom operator. The A.V. Club says this reputation is likely how he was noticed by director George Lucas when Lucas was forming his Star Wars crew.

He recorded sound on set for Star Wars (1977), which won the Academy Award for Best Sound and BAFTA Award for Best Sound; he was not named in the award citations and his work was uncredited. However, he was included when the Academy Award winners were invited to a celebratory lunch with the British royal family at Buckingham Palace. His first film was Paranoiac in 1963, (Note: Nightingall was the boom operator for another 1963 film, Kiss of the Vampire, which bears a 1962 copyright.) and his last credited work was Lost in Space in 1998. He retired in the early 2000s.

=== Pink Shorts Boom Guy ===
Nightingall (center right in pink shorts) on the set of Star Wars in Tunisia. The original Reddit caption was: "Next time you watch Star Wars, I need you to remind yourself that all the dialogue you hear was recorded by a man in pink short shorts".

The nickname "Pink Shorts Boom Guy" was applied to Nightingall in 2015. A photograph that had been taken during the filming of Star Wars in 1976 was published on Reddit and subsequently became popular on the internet due to its depiction of Nightingall, working as a boom operator, dressed only in pink shorts. The photograph was taken in Tunisia where the crew was shooting scenes of Tatooine with actors Alec Guinness and Mark Hamill. Nightingall explained that Tunisia was very hot and so he chose to dress in only shorts. Roger Christian, who worked on the film's production design, agreed that "the heat was more than enough to warrant pink shorts".

He developed cult status among Star Wars and film fans because of the unusual choice. The outfit quickly inspired comic con costumes, as well as receiving merchandise based on Nightingall in custom Star Wars action figures and Lego minifigures. A guide to making a Pink Shorts Boom Guy costume was created by 2019, indicating that the pink shorts should be made of terry towelling, with a Facebook group also set up for ideas on alternatives to a real boom pole.

== Death ==
Nightingall died at his home near London on 19 May 2020 at the age of 92. He is survived by his wife and two children. His son, Terence, also works in the film industry. His death was announced on 21 May by the Association of Motion Picture Sound, and came in the same week as the death of Star Wars publicist Charles Lippincott and the 40th anniversary of the release of The Empire Strikes Back. Clayton Sandell, who interviewed Nightingall and his son in 2019, tweeted that he had died from COVID-19 during the COVID-19 pandemic in England.

Multi-Oscar-winning sound engineer Chris Munro led the tributes to Nightingall; he wrote: "I first met Ken when I entered the industry over 50 years ago. He was immensely supportive of me as I carved my early career as a young sound mixer. 'Legend' is the word that springs to mind when I try to describe him. He will be sadly missed by our film community but his is a life and career that should be celebrated."
