= Bartholomew Kemp =

16th-century English politician

Bartholomew Kemp (fl. 1584–1589), of London, was an English politician.

He was a Member (MP) of the Parliament of England for Shaftesbury in 1584, for Eye in 1586 and for Castle Rising in 1589.
