= Charles R. Cutler =

American industrial engineer (1936–2020)

Charles R. Cutler (1936 – March 16, 2020) was an American engineer who specialized in the field of advanced process control. He was an elected member of the National Academy of Engineering.

https://www.aiche.org/sites/default/files/styles/ache_portrait_no-up-scale_nocrop/public/aiche-proceedings/people/P160948_0.jpg?itok=_AtSOM8T

== Biography ==
Charles held BS and Ph.D. degrees in Chemical Engineering. He started working as an engineer for Shell Oil Co. in 1961. There, he developed the Dynamic Matrix Control Algorithm DMC, which made it possible to control and optimize the processes in the refinery. He was eventually given management oversight of all the control systems at Shell, and DMC became the standard method of controlling complex processes at Shell during the late 1970s and early '80s. In 1984, Cutler founded DMC Corporation that he sold to Aspen Technology in 1996. After two years of working as a Senior Consultant at Aspentech,in 1999, he founded a second company called the Cutler Technology Corporation. Some control engineering applications that have brought a competitive edge to the current Oil and Gas industry, namely Dynamic Matrix Control (DMC) and Real Time Optimization (RTO) were conceived by Cutler. In 2000, he was elected a member of the National Academy of Engineering for his contributions to inventing, developing, and commercialization of a new class of advanced process control technology. He has been called by some a pioneer of advanced process control, who created a new class of jobs in this sector by his contributions to this field.

Distinguished Adjunct Professor of Chemical and Biomolecular Engineering| University of Houston

Cutler died on March 16, 2020.

== Honors ==
- 1998 AICHE CAST division’s Best Practice’s Award, by the American Control Conference’s Engineering Practice Award
- 2000 elected to the National Academy of Engineering NAE for invention, development, and commercial implementation of a new-generation digital process control technology.
- 2003 Control Magazine’s Hall of Fame
