= Morris Barrow =

Morris Barrow (fl. 1640), was an English Member of Parliament (MP).

He was a Member of the Parliament of England for Eye in 1640.
