= Charles Cutler (English MP) =

English Member of Parliament (died 1582)

Charles Cutler (died 1582), of Eye, Suffolk, was an English Member of Parliament (MP).

He was the son of Nicholas Cutler, MP for Liverpool. He was a Member of the Parliament of England for Eye in 1571 and 1572.
