= Miles Nightingall =

General Sir Miles Nightingall KCB
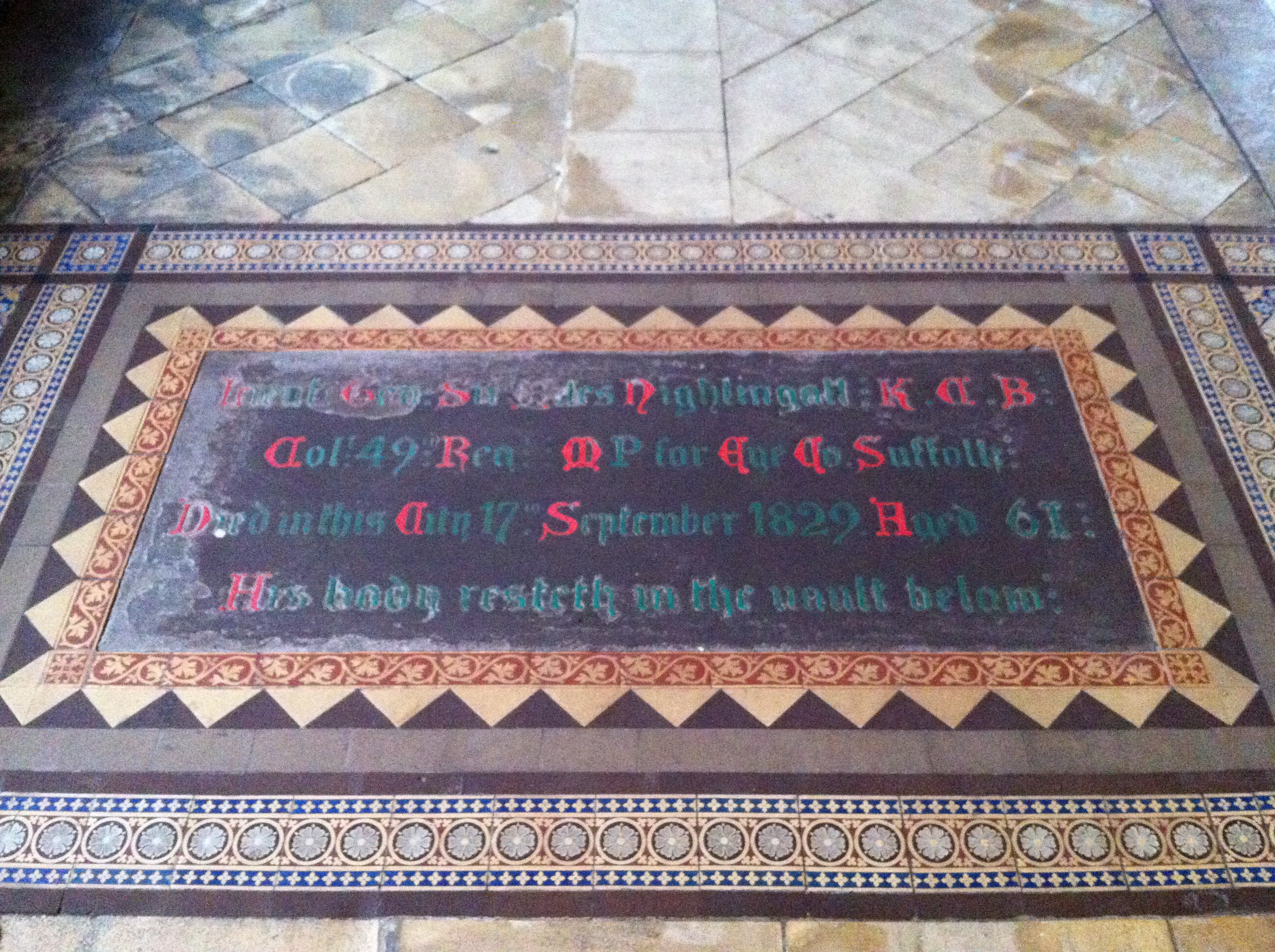
- Memorial to General Sir Miles Nightingall in Gloucester Cathedral
- Born: 25 December 1768
- Died: 12 September 1829
- Military career
- Allegiance: United Kingdom
- Branch: British Army
- Rank: General
- Commands: Bombay Army
- Awards: Knight Commander of the Order of the Bath

General Sir Miles Nightingall KCB (25 December 1768 – 12 September 1829) was a British Army officer. He sat in the House of Commons as a Tory from 1820 to 1829.

== Military career ==
Nightingall entered the army in 1787. He served in India and in England with Lord Cornwallis and was at Puerto Rico with Ralph Abercromby in 1797 and at the San Domingo with Thomas Maitland in December 1797. He arranged the evacuation of Port-au-Prince. He commanded the 4th Battalion in Ireland during Cornwallis' Viceroyalty, and was on the staff when the latter went as Ambassador-Extraordinary to France in 1802. He was also Military Secretary during Cornwallis' Viceroyalty in India.

In the mid-1800s he was stationed in the British penal colony of New South Wales, where he commanded the 73rd Regiment. In 1809 he declined an offer to become Governor. Instead in 1811 he took command of the 1st Division in the Anglo-Portuguese Army in the Peninsular War before going again to India, where he was the Commander-in-chief of the Bombay Army from 24 February 1816 to 9 October 1819. He returned to England in 1819 and was elected at the 1820 general election as a Member of Parliament (MP) for Eye, and held the seat until his death in 1829, aged 60.

Military offices
Preceded by John Abercromby	C-in-C, Bombay Army; 1816–1819	Succeeded by Sir Charles Colville
Preceded by Sir Alexander Maitland, 1st Baronet	Colonel of the 49th (Princess of Wales's Hertfordshire) Regiment; 1820–1829	Succeeded by Sir Gordon Drummond
Parliament of the United Kingdom
Preceded by Mark Singleton; Sir Robert Gifford	Member of Parliament for Eye; 1820 – 1829; With: Sir Robert Gifford to 1824; Sir Edward Kerrison, Bt from 1824	Succeeded by Sir Philip Sidney, Bt; Sir Edward Kerrison, Bt
