= George Brooke (MP) =

George Brooke (c.1544-1600), of Aspall and Belstead, Suffolk, was an English Member of Parliament (MP).

He was a Member of the Parliament of England for Eye in 1584.
