= Edward Honing =

16th-century English politician

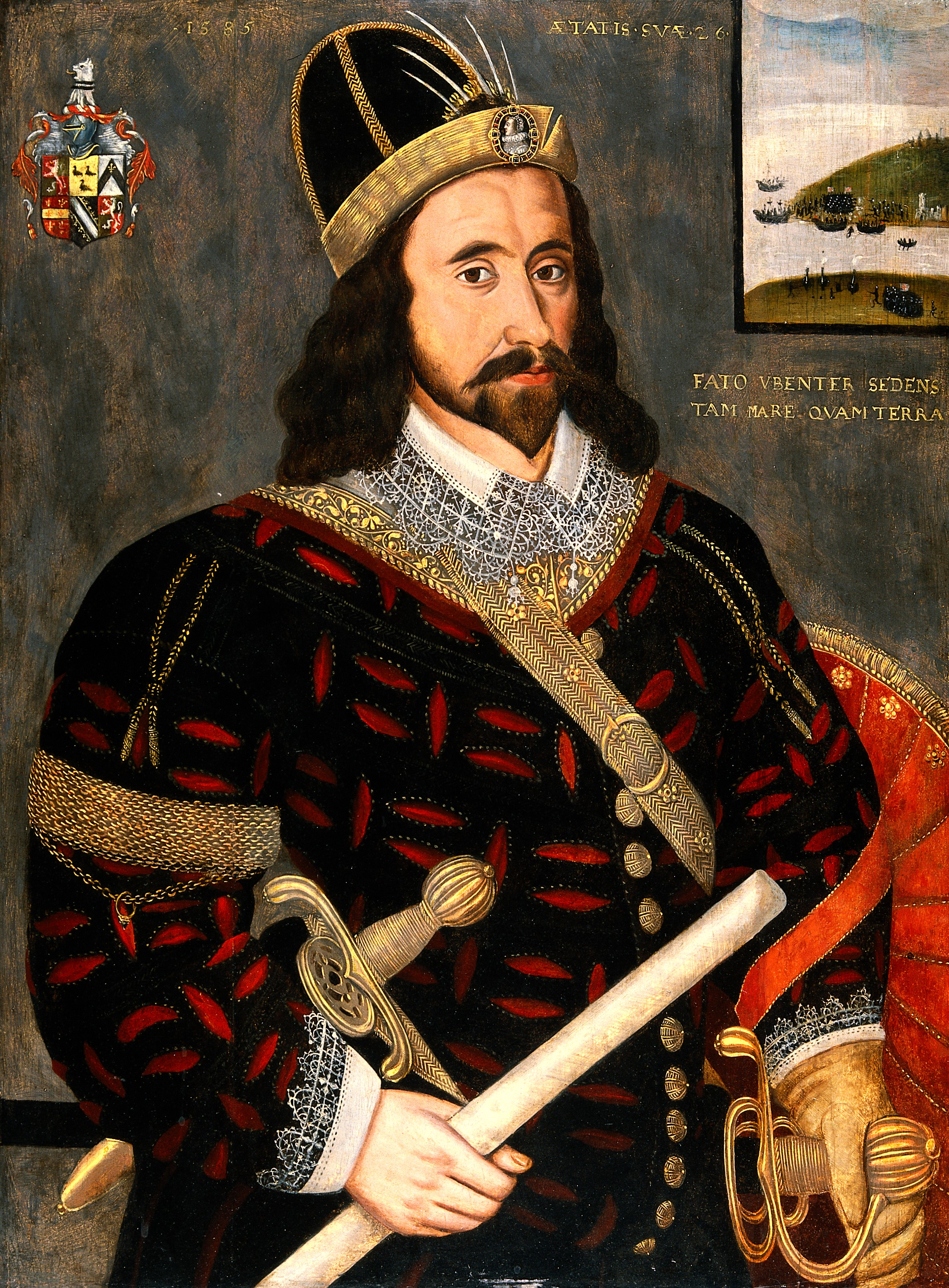
- Born: 1550
- Died: 1609 (aged 58–59)
- Burial place: Eye, Suffolk
- Occupation: MP
- Spouse: Ursula Wingfield
- Parent(s): William Honnyng and Frances Cutler

Edward Honing (1550–1609), of Darsham, Suffolk, was an English Member of Parliament (MP). He was a Member of the Parliament of England for Dunwich in 1589 and for Eye in 1593, 1597, 1601 and 1604. He was the son of William Honing, MP for Winchester and Orford.

== Early life ==
The Honing (or Honnyng, Honning, Hunnings) family came originally from the Holland district of South Lincolnshire. The eldest child of William Honnyng MP and Frances née Cutler, Edward was born in 1550, in Eye, Suffolk - his mother’s home village

In 1569, when Edward was only 19 his father died, and he was made a ward of his mother until he reached maturity.

== Career ==
In October 1567 Edward matriculated to Christ’s College Cambridge, where his uncle Thomas had been in 1550. He was later made a Fellow-Commoner at Christ’s College. In 1570, after his father had died, Edward was admitted to Gray’s Inn. Following the death of his mother in October 1571, Edward inherited extensive lands and properties, centred around his estates in Suffolk. He built Darsham Hall in 1579, in the Suffolk village of Darsham.

Honing was elected to Parliament in 1589, returned as MP for Dunwich on the Suffolk coast, followed by four periods representing Eye, Suffolk in 1593, 1597, 1601 and 1604 - the first Parliament of James I. He was appointed a Justice of the Peace in 1596, and was granted the Receivership of Exchequer revenues for Suffolk and Cambridgeshire.

== Marriage and children ==
Honing married Ursula Wingfield, the daughter of Anthony Wingfield, one of Queen Elizabeth’s Ushers of the Black Rod, and granddaughter of Sir Anthony Wingfield, by Catherine Blennerhassett. They had nine children, of whom only six survived into adulthood:

- Frances (born c. 1582) who married John Archdale of Darsham, from who the family of Archdale of Fermanagh are descended.
- Katherine (born 1584), who married Cordell Saville or Clerkenwell.
- Ursula (born 1587), who married Isaac Thomson.
- Mary (born 1588), who married John Gray of Thrandeston, Suffolk.
- Elizabeth (born 1592), who married John Jermyn of Brightwell, Suffolk.
- Wingfield (born 1590).

== Death ==
Honing died in 1609, and was buried in Eye Church on 6 May. He died intestate, which left his widow and children with lengthy legal battles for the next 24 years before they received administration of Edward’s extensive estate. A lengthy court battle arose, as Edward Honning had left no will, and his son Wingfield Honning was mentally disabled; most of the wealth was gradually lost as the family fought moves by the unscrupulous lawyer John Cusacke and Baron Sotherton.

== References and further reading ==
- Archdale, Henry Blackwood, Memoirs of the Archdales, Enniskillen, 1925, page 11
- Herald’s Visitation of Suffolk in 1577
- Barry, T. Life and Family History of William Honnyng, London, 2008
- Bindoff, S (editor), History of Parliament, London 1982
- Collectanea Topographica et Genealogica (CT&G), vol vii
- Foster, W E, Hunnings Families, Pollard & Co, Exeter, 1912
