= Huntingdon Colby =

Huntingdon Colby (1587-by 1618), of London, was an English Member of Parliament (MP).

He was a Member of the Parliament of England for Eye in 1614.
