= Thomas Gawdy (died 1556) =

English politician

Thomas Gawdy (by 1509 – 1556), of Shotesham and Redenhall, Norfolk, was Serjeant-at-law, an English barrister, Recorder, and member of parliament.

== Career ==
=== Family and name ===
There were three sons of Thomas Gawdy of Harleston, Norfolk, by three different wives, each of whom received the baptismal name of Thomas. There was the present Thomas Gawdy (d.1556), and Thomas Gawdy (d.1588), and Francis Gawdy, who was baptised Thomas but changed his name at confirmation. The subject of this article was the eldest one, by his father’s first wife Elizabeth Hellows.

=== Legal and parliamentary career ===
Apart from his distinguished legal career, Gawdy was a Member of Parliament for Salisbury in 1545, Lynn in 1547, and Norwich in October 1553.

Sir Nicholas Hare, who married Katherine Bassingbourne, the sister of Gawdy's first wife Anne, was an influential friend of his.

=== Marriages ===
By 1530 he had married Anne, daughter and coheiress of John Bassingbourne of Woodhall, Hatfield, Hertsfordshire, by his wife Audrey Cotton. Anne Bassingbourne's paternal grandparents were Thomas Bassingbourne and his wife Katherine Say, the daughter of Sir John Say and his wife Elizabeth Cheney, and the sister of Anne Say and Elizabeth Tilney. Thomas Gawdy married secondly Elizabeth, daughter of John Harris of Radford, the widow of Walter Staynings of Honeycott, Somerset. He married thirdly by settlement dated 9 July 1554, Katherine (d.1564), the daughter of Robert Lestrange and sister of Sir Thomas Lestrange, the widow of Sir Hugh Hastings of Elsing in Norfolk.

He had several children. With his first wife Anne Bassingbourne, he had the children:

- Thomas Gawdy of Gawdy Hall in the parish of Redenhall in Norfolk, who married Honour, daughter of Walter Staynings of Honycott in county Somerset. Thomas Gawdy, Esq. bought the manor of Holebrook in Redenhall from Edward Bacon (b.1552), son of Robert Bacon of Specteshall (d.1558) and ward of the Queen’s Majesty at the time of Visitations. Edward Bacon (b.1552) later married his daughter Katherine at Redenhall on 16 October 1569. They had the children Honour Bacon, baptised 23 May 1574, Robert Bacon, baptised 20 October 1577, Nicholas Bacon, buried 4 November 1585 and Cecily, buried 2 February 1586. The other children of Thomas Gawdy and Honour Staynings were Thomas Gawdy of Waybred in Suffolk, who married Ursula, daughter of Francis Bolton of Burston in Norfolk, and had Henry Gawdy, who married a daughter Rushbrook of Suffolk, and lived in Ireland, Owen Gawdy, who married Frances, daughter of Francis Bolton of Burston and had two daughters, Rafe Gawdy, ob. s.p., and Mary. Thomas Gawdy of Gawdy Hall in the parish of Redenhall in Norfolk sold many properties, including Claxton, to his uncle Thomas Gawdy (d.1588). His uncle remainded long in his debt.
- Bassingbourne (d.1590), and through him he was the grandfather of Sir Bassingbourne Gawdy
- Katherine, who married Henry Everard of Lynsted in Suffolk

By his second wife Elizabeth Harris he had the son:

- Anthony Gawdy, also a member of parliament, who died unmarried, but was very close to his two nephews, the sons of Bassingbourne.
