= Philip Gawdy =

English landowner and letter writer (1562–1617)

Philip Gawdy (13 July 1562 – 27 May 1617) was an English landowner, politician, and letter writer.

== Career ==
Gawdy was the son of Bassingbourne Gawdy, senior, and Anne Wotton. He was the younger brother of Bassingbourne Gawdy.

Gawdy studied law in London, and looked for opportunities at the royal court. He wrote to his parents with news including the appointment of Amias Paulet as a commissioner for peace in the Netherlands, and competition for the shrievalties of Norfolk and Suffolk, and news of the conflict in Ireland. He wrote of fabrics and fashion at court to his sister-in-law-Anne.

Gawdy was a Member of Parliament (MP) for Thetford in 1589, Eye in 1593, Thetford in 1597, Sudbury in 1601, and Dunwich in 1604 and 1614.

In 1591, Gawdy joined the crew of the Revenge commanded by Richard Grenville in a small fleet under Thomas Howard. After encountering the Spanish at the Battle of Flores, Gawdy was captured and imprisoned in Lisbon at São Jorge Castle. He was released after undertaking to pay £200 in an exchange of prisoners.

Gawdy's relatives in Norfolk asked him to commission clothes in the latest London fashion for them, including hats and a farthingale.

In later years, Gawdy mostly lived at West Harling. In 1605 his nephew, Bassingbourne's son, Framlingham Gawdy, had an unsuitable affair or involvement with a Mistress Havers, according to the report of Elizabeth Kitson. Gawdy took him to London, showing him the lions at the Tower of London, the royal tombs at Westminster Abbey, and the court, where his "cousins" Mary Gargrave and Elizabeth Southwell, the latter from nearby Woodrising, Norfolk, were maids of honour to Anne of Denmark.

Gawdy married Bridget (died 1609), daughter of Bartholomew Strangman of Hadleigh, Essex. He died in London on 27 May 1617.

== Letters and papers ==
Gawdy's letters are held by the British Library. There are extensive archives of the Gawdy family.
