= Francis Wyndham (judge) =

English politician

The monument to Francis Wyndham in the church of St Peter Mancroft, Norwich

Francis Wyndham (died 1592), of Norwich, Beeston and Pentney, Norfolk, was an English judge who once sat in parliament.

He was a member of parliament (MP) for Norfolk in 1572.
