= Bassingbourne Gawdy (MP for Eye) =

English politician

Bassingbourne Gawdy (d. 20 January 1590), of West Harling, Norfolk, was an English landowner, magistrate and member of parliament (MP).

Gawdy was the second son of Thomas Gawdy (d.1556) of Shotesham and Redenhall, Norfolk, by his father's first wife, Anne, daughter and coheiress of John Bassingbourne of Woodhall, Hatfield, Hertfordshire. He was educated at Trinity Hall, Cambridge, matriculating in 1545, and trained in the law at the Inner Temple.

Gawdy was appointed a justice of the peace for Suffolk from about 1573 and for Norfolk from around 1583, and was High Sheriff of Norfolk for 1578–1579. In 1584 he was elected an MP for Eye, Suffolk.

Gawdy was buried on 25 January 1589/90 at West Harling.

== Family ==
Gawdy married twice.

Gawdy's first wife was Anne, the daughter of John Wootton of North Tuddenham, Norfolk. They were married on 26 September 1558. Through her, Bassingbourne obtained property in West Harling. She was buried at West Harling on 9 June 1587. They had two sons: Bassingbourne Gawdy II and Philip Gawdy

Gawdy's second wife was Margaret, the daughter of Eustace Sulyard, and widow of Thomas Darcy of Tolleshunt D'Arcy, Essex. They married in December 1588: she died within two years, and was buried on 15 August 1590.
