= Bassingbourne Gawdy II =

English politician

Sir Bassingbourne Gawdy (1560 – 17 May 1606), of West Harling, Norfolk, was an English lawyer and judge, knight, and member of parliament.

== Biography ==
Gawdy was the son of Bassingbourne Gawdy of West Harling, Norfolk, and Anne (died 1587), daughter of John Wootton of North Tuddenham in Norfolk. He was a brother of Phillip Gawdy (1562–1617).

Having trained for the law at the Inner Temple, he was appointed a justice of the peace for Norfolk by 1591 and High Sheriff of Norfolk for 1593–94 and 1601–02. He also served as a deputy lieutenant for Norfolk in 1605. He was a member of parliament (MP) for Norfolk in 1601. Later, Gawdy became the MP of Thetford from 1593 to 1604.

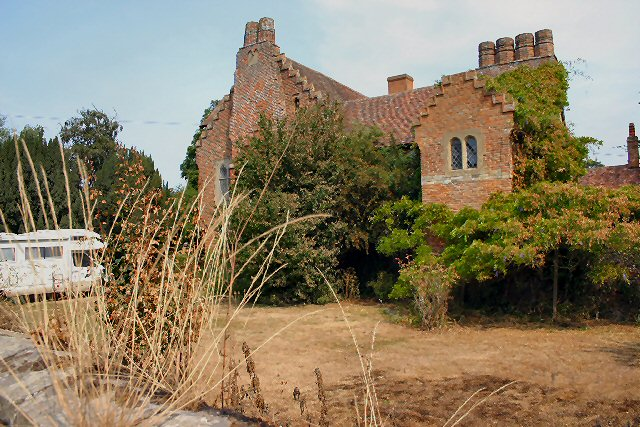
Bardwell Hall

Gawdy succeeded his father in 1590 (inheriting his lands at West Harling and nearby Bardwell Hall, Suffolk) and was knighted in 1597.

Gawdy died on 17 May 1606. He was succeeded by his eldest son, Framlingham Gawdy.

== Family ==
Gawdy first married Anne daughter of Charles Framlingham of Crow's Hall, Debenham in Suffolk. Gawdy's second wife was Dorothy the daughter of Nicholas Bacon of Redgrave, Suffolk.

Dorothy was the mother of Anne Gawdy. She was popular in court circles, and King James visited Nicolas Bacon's house from Newmarket Palace to see her in January 1618.
