= 1984 Pulitzer Prize =

Awards for journalism and related fields

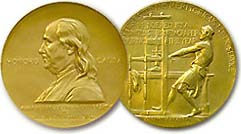
The gold medal awarded for Public Service in Journalism.

The Pulitzer Prize is awarded to the best in journalism and the arts for pieces of exceptional quality. In 1984, the recipients were:

== Journalism ==
- Public Service:
  - Los Angeles Times, for an in-depth examination of southern California's growing Latino community by a team of editors and reporters.
- Local General or Spot News Reporting:
  - Newsday team of reporters, for their enterprising and comprehensive coverage of the Baby Jane Doe case and its far-reaching social and political implications.
- Local Investigative Specialized Reporting:
  - Kenneth Cooper, Joan Fitzgerald, Jonathan Kaufman, Norman Lockman, Gary McMillan, Kirk Scharfenberg and David Wessel of The Boston Globe, for their series examining race relations in Boston, a notable exercise in public service that turned a searching gaze on some the city's most honored institutions including The Globe itself.
- National Reporting:
  - John Noble Wilford of The New York Times, for reporting on a wide variety of scientific topics of national import.
- International Reporting:
  - Karen Elliott House of The Wall Street Journal, for her extraordinary series of interviews with Jordan's King Hussein which correctly anticipated the problems that would confront the Reagan administration's Middle East peace plan.
- Feature Writing:
  - Peter Mark Rinearson of The Seattle Times, for "Making It Fly," his account of the new Boeing 757 jetliner.
- Commentary:
  - Vermont Royster of The Wall Street Journal
- Criticism:
  - Paul Goldberger of The New York Times, for architectural criticism.
- Editorial Writing:
  - Albert Scardino of Georgia Gazette (Savannah), for his series of editorials on various local and state matters.
- Spot News Photography
  - Stan Grossfeld of The Boston Globe, for his series of unusual photographs which reveal the effects of war on the people of Lebanon.
- Feature Photography
  - Anthony Suau of The Denver Post, for a series of photographs which depict the tragic effects of starvation in Ethiopia and for a single photograph of a woman at her husband's gravesite on Memorial Day.

== Letters, Drama, and Music ==
- Fiction:
  - Ironweed by William Kennedy (Viking)
- Drama:
  - Glengarry Glen Ross by David Mamet (Grove)
- History:
  - No award
- Biography or Autobiography:
  - Booker T. Washington: The Wizard of Tuskegee, 1901–1915 by Louis R. Harlan (Oxford University Press)
- Poetry:
  - American Primitive by Mary Oliver (Atlantic-Little)
- General Nonfiction:
  - The Social Transformation of American Medicine by Paul Starr (Basic Books)
- Music:
  - "Canti del Sole" for Tenor and Orchestra by Bernard Rands (Universal Edition)

== Special Citations and Awards ==
- Letters:
  - Theodor Seuss Geisel, Special citation to Theodor Seuss Geisel (pen name "Dr. Seuss"), for his special contribution over nearly half a century to the education and enjoyment of America's children and their parents.
