= Marvin's Room =

Marvin's Room may refer to:

- "Marvins Room", a song by Drake from the album Take Care
- Marvin's Room (play), by Scott McPherson
- Marvin's Room (film), 1996 adaptation of the play, directed by Jerry Zaks
- Marvin's Room (studio), formerly Marvin Gaye Studios
- Marvin's Room (radio show), a Canadian radio show devoted to rhythm and blues music
- "Marvin's Room", a song by Lil Wayne from the mixtape Sorry 4 the Wait
