= Rishi Bhat =

American actor and internet entrepreneur

- Born: May 19, 1984 (age 42); Chicago, Illinois, U.S.
- Occupations: Entrepreneur, former child actor
- Years active: 1994–2000

Rishi Bhat (born May 19, 1984) is an American former child actor and internet entrepreneur.

== Personal life ==
Bhat is of Indian descent. His parents are immigrants to the United States. His father Shrikant is a metallurgical engineer. Bhat's interest in computers began when he received his first computer at the age of three years. Bhat is an alumnus of the University of Pennsylvania, where he obtained both bachelor's and master's degrees in computer science/mathematics, in a total of 4 years.

== Career ==
=== Actor ===
Bhat held the role of Patrick, co-starring alongside Hal Scardino and Litefoot in the 1995 film The Indian in the Cupboard, for which he received a Young Artist Award nomination.

=== Software entrepreneur ===
Between the fall of 1999 and spring of 2000, Bhat sold two internet startups, SiegeSoft.com and myEDesk.com, to a Canadian software firm.

SiegeSoft was written by Bhat during the summer of 1999, while a sophomore at the University of Chicago Laboratory School. When a summer pre-calculus class he wished to take was canceled, he instead spent the time writing SiegeSoft as an anonymity software program to allow users to surf the internet without leaving a trail.

Originally sold online, SiegeSoft hides subscribers' identities when they use the internet and scrambles records of sites visited. Though competing software began to materialize online, SiegeSoft was determined to be both more secure and easier to use than existing software. Rocca Resources, a Vancouver-based mineral-exploration company, purchased SiegeSoft from Bhat for $40,000 cash, 1.5 million shares of Rocca stock, plus shares in Rocca's first two years of profits in exchange for Bhat's continued work on refining the program. Rocca later purchased the startup MyEdesk.com from Bhat and his partner Chaitanya Mehra, with each receiving 110,000 shares of Rocca stock.
