= Albert Scardino =

American journalist

- Born: 1948 or 1949 (age 77–78); Baltimore, Maryland, U.S.
- Education: Columbia University (BA); University of California, Berkeley (MA)
- Spouse: Marjorie Scardino (m. 1974)
- Children: 3, including Hal
- Awards: Pulitzer Prize for Editorial Writing (1984)

Albert Scardino (born 1948 or 1949) is an American journalist and former publisher of The Georgia Gazette who is known for winning the Pulitzer Prize for Editorial Writing in 1984.

== Early life and education ==
Scardino was born in Baltimore, Maryland, and grew up in Savannah, Georgia, where his father, Dr. Peter Scardino, practiced medicine. He graduated from Savannah Country Day School. After receiving his Bachelor of Arts from Columbia College in 1970, he went on to get his Master of Arts in journalism at the University of California at Berkeley. At Columbia, he was night editor of the Columbia Daily Spectator.

== Career ==
On April 10, 1978, he started The Georgia Gazette with his wife Majorie on $50,000 raised among family and friends and the two managed the daily operations of the newspaper as publishers and maintained a staff of around twenty. The newspaper was famous for its investigative journalism that exposed the corruption of Sam Caldwell, who was later convicted of fraud conspiracy. He won the Pulitzer Prize in 1984 for his editorials exposing the corruption and ineptitude of local and state governments. However, their style of journalism did not appeal to many locals, and the paper occasionally met resistance from the officials, including then mayor John Rousakis. Circulation of the newspaper was meager and hovered between 2,500 and 4,000. Eventually, financial constraints forced the couple to shut down the newspaper in 1985.

Scardino was later hired by The New York Times as an editor and worked there until 1990, when he was hired by mayor David Dinkins as his press secretary, a role he served until his resignation 1991.

He later moved to the United Kingdom with his wife after she was promoted to the CEO of the Economist Group and worked as a journalist and executive editor of The Guardian from 2002 to 2004. He also served as a governor of The Royal Shakespeare Company, a director of Media Standards Trust, and judge on the Orwell Prize jury in 2008.

Outside of his journalism career, he owned Notts County F.C., the world's oldest professional association football club, in a futile attempt to help it get out of debt.

== Personal life ==
In 1974, he married Marjorie Scardino (née Morris), who was raised in Texas and received her BA from Baylor University and JD from the University of San Francisco. She became the first female CEO of a FTSE 100 Index company when she was appointed as the chief executive of British publisher Pearson plc in 1997. The couple has three children, including Hal Scardino, who was a child actor known for playing the protagonist in The Indian in the Cupboard and two films: Searching for Bobby Fischer (1993) and Marvin's Room (1996).
