= Patrick Gibson, Baron Gibson =

British publishing executive and arts administrator (1916–2004)

The Right Honourable The Lord Gibson
- Gibson photographed by Lord Snowdon in 1988
- Born: Richard Patrick Tallentyre Gibson; February 5, 1916; Kensington, London, England
- Died: April 20, 2004 (aged 88); Penn's Rocks, near Groombridge, East Sussex, England
- Education: Eton College; Magdalen College, Oxford
- Occupations: Publishing executive and arts administrator
- Employer(s): Pearson plc; Financial Times Ltd; Arts Council of Great Britain; National Trust
- Known for: Chair of the Arts Council of Great Britain and the National Trust; chairman of Pearson plc
- Title: Life peer as Baron Gibson
- Spouse: Dione Pearson (m. 1945–2004)
- Children: 4 sons
- Military career
- Allegiance: United Kingdom
- Branch: British Army
- Unit: Middlesex Yeomanry
- Conflicts: North African campaign; Italian campaign

Member of the House of Lords
- Lord Temporal
- Life peerage 31 January 1975 – 20 April 2004

Personal details
- Party: Crossbench

Richard Patrick Tallentyre Gibson, Baron Gibson (5 February 1916 – 20 April 2004) was a British publishing executive, arts administrator and life peer. After wartime service in North Africa, imprisonment in Italy, escape after the Italian Armistice and later work with the Special Operations Executive, he became a senior figure in the Pearson group. He chaired the Arts Council of Great Britain from 1972 to 1977 and the National Trust from 1977 to 1986. In business he was group chairman of Pearson plc from 1978 to 1983 and chairman of Financial Times Ltd from 1975 to 1977. He sat in the House of Lords as a Crossbench peer from 1975 until his death.

== Early life and war service ==
Gibson was educated at Eton and Magdalen College, Oxford. His parents were both accomplished singers, his father a former professional baritone and his mother a lieder recitalist, and he later said he would have liked to be an orchestral conductor.

He joined the Middlesex Yeomanry in 1939 and served in the North African campaign, being taken prisoner at Derna in Libya in April 1941. He was held for two years in prisoner-of-war camps in northern Italy, including at Fontanellato near Parma. Camp PG 49 at Fontanellato occupied a former orphanage and held about 500 Allied officers and 100 other ranks.

After the Italian Armistice in September 1943 the commandant of Camp PG 49, Colonel Eugenio Vicedomini, warned that German forces were approaching and told the prisoners to leave; the inmates then dispersed into the countryside. Vicedomini was later sent to a German concentration camp for opening the gates of the camp.

Gibson travelled south with Edward Tomkins and Hugh Cruddas. Local civilians supplied food, shelter and clothing despite the risks of German reprisals. In one village, a shopkeeper saw the inscription from Gibson's mother on his watch, refused to accept the watch as payment and supplied food without charge. Gibson, Tomkins and Cruddas moved south from the Po valley, crossed the Apennines and German lines, and reached Allied territory after 81 days. Gibson later recalled reaching Allied lines on the Sangro in the Abruzzi as one of the defining moments of his life.

Back in Allied hands, he returned to Britain and was seconded to the Italian section of the Special Operations Executive. From 1944 to 1945 he served in Italy supporting partisan operations, and from 1945 to 1946 he worked in the Foreign Office's Political Intelligence Department.

== Pearson and the Financial Times ==
After the war, Gibson joined the Pearson family's Westminster Press group in 1947, toured its provincial newspapers and became a director in 1948. He later joined the boards of the Financial Times, The Economist and Pearson plc. His marriage to Dione Pearson, granddaughter of Weetman Pearson, 1st Viscount Cowdray, connected him to the Pearson family, but obituaries also stressed his operational experience within the group. He chaired Pearson Longman from 1967 to 1979, chaired Financial Times Ltd from 1975 to 1977, and was group chairman of Pearson plc from 1978 to 1983.

As Pearson's group chairman, he supported the Financial Times's first overseas printing operation. The Frankfurt European edition began on 2 January 1979, making Frankfurt the paper's first print site outside Britain.

Within Pearson he backed diversification into visitor attractions. Shortly before becoming group chairman he supported the takeover of Madame Tussauds and placed Chessington Zoo under the same management; in 1979 Pearson also took a stake in a United States theme-park operator, a step that preceded the group's later ownership of Alton Towers.

During the industrial conflicts of the 1970s he opposed a journalists' closed shop, leading to a six-month strike at the Northern Echo. The Daily Telegraph later described his Pearson style as strategic and unobtrusive, noting that he ran the group "from an eyrie in the Millbank Tower" and was sometimes called "Cowdray's Viceroy".

== Arts Council of Great Britain ==
Gibson was appointed chair of the Arts Council of Great Britain in 1972, succeeding Arnold Goodman under the Conservative government of Edward Heath. Contemporary accounts linked his selection to the arts brief held by Lord Eccles. His tenure coincided with high inflation, pay pressures, pressure for wider regional access to arts funding and continuing debate over subsidy for major national institutions. A later assessment in the Financial Times characterised the central problem of the period as "insufficient funds to sustain the national 'centres of excellence' just as it came under pressure to increase funding for the regions".

Working with Labour arts minister Hugh Jenkins from 1974 to 1976, the Council backed a stronger role for the Regional Arts Associations. Jenkins told the House of Commons in 1974 that the Arts Council would "continue to give a high priority" to supporting the associations. In a 1977 House of Lords debate Gibson reviewed the period, identifying progress on touring and regional funding followed by financial constraint after the 1973–74 economic crisis and high inflation. The wider arts-policy context also included arguments over public access to national collections: in March 1974 Jenkins told the House of Commons that he was working with trustees on ending museum admission charges.

The Council also considered proposals to rationalise major companies. Press coverage at the time recorded Treasury interest in merging the Royal Opera House and English National Opera; the Council maintained support for both. Gibson defended continued public funding for established institutions while also supporting wider access to arts provision outside London.

In November 1973 the Council established a Community Arts Working Party, chaired by Professor Harold Baldry, to review support for participatory and locally based activity. Following its report, the Council created a Community Arts Committee in April 1975 "for a two-year experimental period", with much of the support routed through the Regional Arts Associations. The 1976–77 report stated that community arts had "proved their worth" and deserved continuing support at a higher level of subsidy.

Gibson's chairmanship ended in 1977. By then the regional framework had been strengthened, a community arts committee was in place and the Council was restating the principle of arm's-length funding: public money for the arts should pass through an intermediary body exercising independent judgement rather than direct ministerial patronage.

== National Trust ==
Gibson chaired the National Trust from 1977 to 1986. Before becoming chair he had served on the Trust's executive committee from 1963 and sat on Sir Henry Benson's 1968 review of the Trust's management and responsibilities. Membership passed the one million mark in 1980 and continued to rise during his chairmanship. Major properties coming to the Trust during the period included Studley Royal Park, Belton House, Calke Abbey and parts of The Argory estate; obituaries also credited him with helping to secure places such as Ightham Mote, Kinder Scout and Wenlock Edge.

A major controversy during his chairmanship concerned proposed Ministry of Defence works at Naphill and Bradenham in the Chilterns, associated with RAF High Wycombe. The scheme affected land connected with the Trust's Bradenham estate and raised questions about the Trust's treatment of land declared inalienable. In a House of Lords debate in March 1982 Gibson said that, if the scheme amounted to the destruction of the Chilterns landscape, the Trust would be "derelict in its duty" if it did not oppose it. He also defended the Trust's statutory power of inalienability, describing it as "an asset uniquely conferred on the trust by Parliament" and "the basis of the trust's whole existence".

In 1983 Gibson chaired an extraordinary general meeting at Wembley requisitioned by members who opposed granting a lease of underground rights beneath the Bradenham estate. After debate, a large majority endorsed the Council's policy; press accounts recorded an attendance of about 8,000. The controversy led Gibson to conclude that the Trust's Council should in future involve itself in all decisions about the use of inalienable land.

== Peerage and other public roles ==
Gibson was created a life peer as Baron Gibson, of Penn's Rocks in the County of East Sussex, in 1975. He sat as a Crossbench peer from 31 January 1975 until his death on 20 April 2004.

He served as chairman of the advisory council of the Victoria and Albert Museum, as a director of the Royal Opera House, as a trustee of Glyndebourne, as a member of the executive committee of the National Art Collections Fund, and as an adviser to the Calouste Gulbenkian Foundation.

== Style and reputation ==
Obituaries emphasised Gibson's quiet authority as a chairman. Martin Drury described him in The Independent as having "a steely impatience with bluster or humbug" and a gift for steering meetings and defusing tension. Andrew Roth wrote in The Guardian that his success at the National Trust owed much to a "non-confrontational human touch". His musical background also shaped his public interests: he was a lifelong concert-goer and maintained close links with opera and Glyndebourne.

== Personal life ==
In 1945 Gibson married Dione Pearson, granddaughter of Weetman Pearson, 1st Viscount Cowdray. They had four sons. He took his title from his home, Penn's Rocks in East Sussex, where he died on 20 April 2004. A Daily Telegraph obituary also noted his second home, an 18th-century villa at Asolo near Venice. He attended Der Rosenkavalier with his family in the week before he died and was still skiing in his eighties.

== Arms ==
Coat of arms of Patrick Gibson, Baron Gibson
Crest A stork rising Argent between two acorns slipped and leaved and holding in the beak an acorn slipped all Proper. Escutcheon Per pale Azure and Argent three acorns slipped and leaved in fess between as many storks rising all counterchanged. Supporters Two nightingales each holding in the beak a scroll of music Proper. Motto Per Ardua Ad Alta

Preceded by Arnold Goodman	Chair of the Arts Council of Great Britain; 1972–1977	Succeeded by Kenneth Robinson
