= Shackelia Jackson =

Jamaican human rights activist (born 1982)

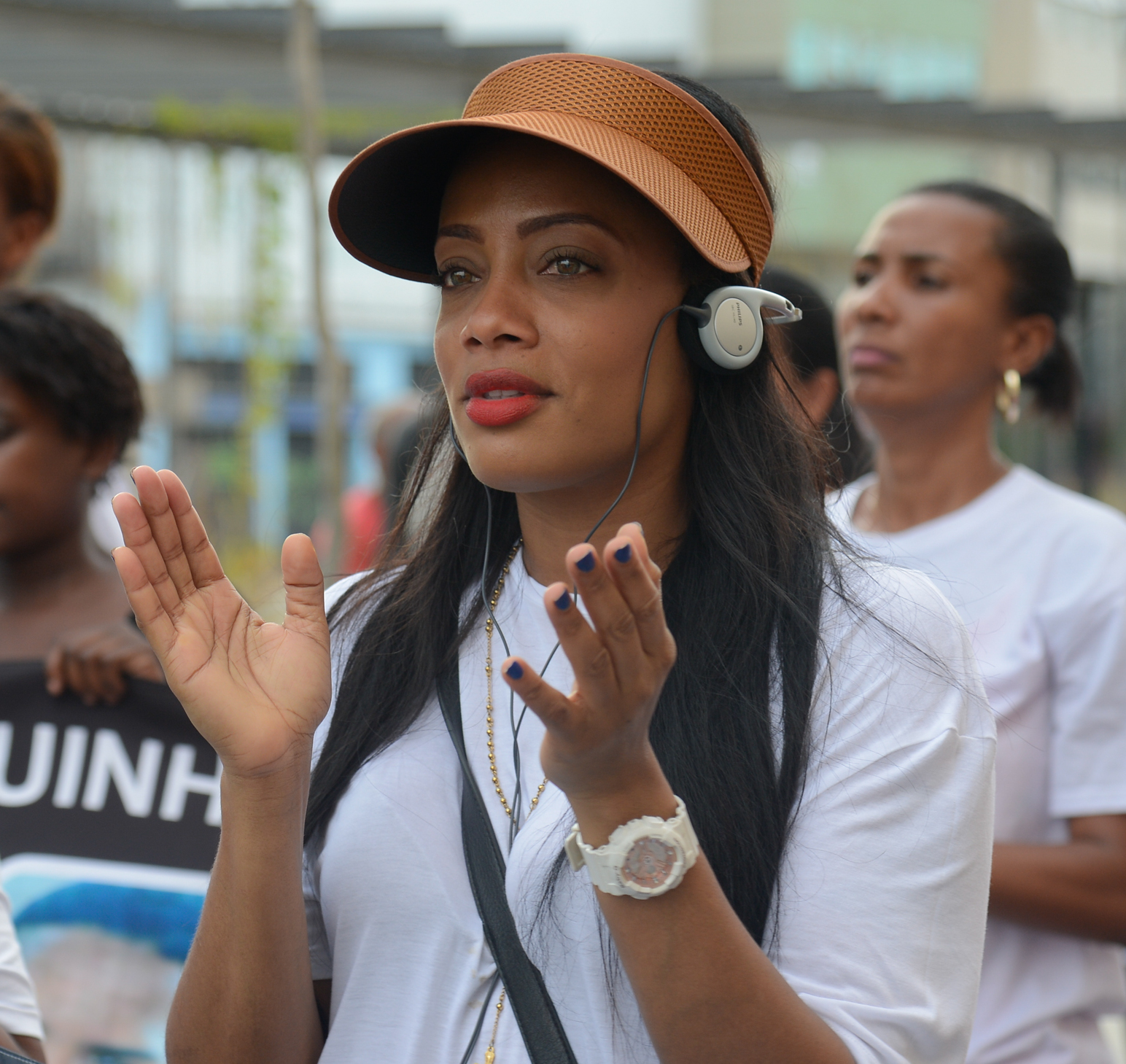
- Shackelia Jackson protesting in Rio de Janeiro
- Born: 27 September 1982; Jamaica
- Known for: Human rights activist

Shackelia Jackson (born 27 September 1982) is a Jamaican human rights activist who has campaigned for justice following her brother's death in 2014.

== Killing of Nakiea Jackson ==
Jackson's brother, Nakiea, was shot dead in 2014 by the Jamaican police in their hometown, Kingston.

Aged 29, Nakiea worked in a restaurant and was known around the Orange Villa community for his cooking skills. On the morning of 20 January 2014, eyewitnesses reported that Nakiea was cooking a large lunch order of fried chicken for the local branch of the National Blood Bank when a police officer came into his shop and shot him twice. He was dragged by his feet and left on a pavement before being thrown in the back of a police car and taken to hospital where he died. The autopsy determined he had died from two gunshot wounds.

When the shooting occurred, Nakiea's sister, Shackelia Jackson, had heard people shouting his name outside her house and she ran to the small restaurant. She first noticed all the food being prepared, as normal. And then she noticed one of Nakeia's slippers on the floor and water dragging blood marks. "My heart stopped. My life stopped that day," she said. Shackelia locked the shop to preserve the crime scene.

Police reported that a robbery was committed in the area and they had attempted to accost the man when he pointed a gun at them. The police officers had been looking for a "Rastafarian-looking" man with dreadlocks. Nakiea fitted that description. The police reported that a 9mm pistol was recovered. Some witnesses said Nakiea was unarmed at the time of the shooting.

The case against the police officer who shot Nakiea was dismissed in July 2016. One of the key witnesses had refused to appear in court. According to Amnesty International, he was too afraid of what might happen afterward.

As of 2017, the Jackson family are appealing the decision.

Shackelia Jackson said:

"The system is broken... We should at least have the opportunity to go to trial, to have a jury hear the case. I want to have the opportunity to see all the evidence and defend my case. I only want justice. This is not an equal fight, but I'm too much of an optimist and will continue in my fight for what is right."

Since 2000, in attempting to fight the country's crime rate with a tough approach, police in Jamaica have allegedly killed more than 3,000 people - mostly young men. In 2017, the recorded number of fatalities at the hands of Jamaican law enforcement officers was 168 people; an average of three people a week in a nation of 2.8 million.

== Campaigning ==
Since Nakiea's death, Shackelia has advocated for human rights and criminal-judicial reform in Jamaica, focusing especially on young men from inner-city low-income neighbourhoods. She took a year off school and spoke for change through the Jamaican courts in terms of how a crime is processed and how police officers are treated after being charged with a crime: "we need legislative changes that are there, on the books, to ensure accountability and transparency. The police have the same training as they did in the 1960s and it needs to evolve to suit 21st century society."

Jackson has stated that:

"I like to say activism chose me. I was set on a life-altering path to bring about the legislative and policy changes that will secure justice for all and end state violence and terrorism in Jamaica, so that future lives can be saved. And despite relentless attempts by the Jamaican authorities to stop me succeeding in this, I am undeterred, and I refuse to give up."

Hannah Chapman in the Northern Echo wrote that:

"Last century’s suffragettes are today’s women human rights defenders. Every day they continue to harness their loud and passionate voices to empower communities, protect the vulnerable and create a fairer, more equal world... Right now, Shackelia Jackson is fighting for justice after her brother was shot dead by police in Jamaica."

In January 2018, Jackson told the Huffington Post that she had received over 6,000 letters, tweets and emails from people across the UK in support of her campaigning as part of Amnesty International's Write for Rights campaign.
