= Westminster Press (Pearson subsidiary) =

Defunct British regional newspaper group owned by Pearson

- Company type: Subsidiary
- Industry: Regional newspapers
- Founded: 1921
- Defunct: 1997
- Fate: Sold to Newsquest
- Area served: United Kingdom
- Key people: Weetman Dickinson Pearson, 1st Viscount Cowdray; Patrick Gibson, Baron Gibson; Weetman Harold Miller Pearson, 2nd Viscount Cowdray; Iain Murray, 10th Duke of Atholl
- Products: Daily and weekly provincial newspapers
- Parent: Pearson plc

Westminster Press was a British group of regional and local newspapers within S. Pearson and Son and later Pearson plc. The company was formed in 1921 and took its name from the London Westminster Gazette. Its origins lay in Liberal newspaper interests associated with the Rowntree family and Weetman Dickinson Pearson, 1st Viscount Cowdray, but it developed into a commercial provincial newspaper group.

Westminster Press became one of the leading publishers of weekly newspapers in the United Kingdom and ran centres in Darlington, Oxford and Brighton. Its best-known titles included The Northern Echo, the Oxford Mail and the Evening Argus. The company was also involved in major debates about chain ownership, local editorial identity and industrial relations in the provincial press. Pearson agreed to sell the group to Newsquest for about £305 million in August 1996; completion followed in 1997 after competition clearance.

== Origins ==
Westminster Press was formed in 1921 from newspaper interests that had been associated with Liberal politics. Rachel Matthews describes the group as growing out of titles linked to the Joseph Rowntree Social Service Trust and the North of England Newspaper Company, including the Birmingham Gazette, Yorkshire Observer, Northern Echo and Nottingham Journal. Weetman Pearson, 1st Viscount Cowdray, made what Matthews calls a "massive" £250,000 investment in the titles before the creation of Westminster Press.

The company took its name from the Westminster Gazette, which was part of the original group. The Westminster Gazette ran from 1893 to 1928. It switched to morning publication on 5 November 1921 and merged with the Daily News on 1 February 1928 to form the Daily News and Westminster Gazette. After the London title closed and its successor shareholding was sold, Westminster Press had no London newspaper holdings; Matthews notes that the group paid its first dividend in 1935, after the Westminster Gazette had closed and after it had rationalised its holdings, including the sale of the Sheffield Independent Company to Allied Newspapers in 1931.

The group expanded by acquiring provincial titles and became part of the wider consolidation of provincial newspaper ownership in the twentieth century.

== Ownership and leadership ==
Pearson family interests directed Westminster Press for most of the twentieth century. Weetman Dickinson Pearson, 1st Viscount Cowdray, is linked to the group’s origins through his ownership of the Westminster Gazette and development of allied provincial holdings.

Senior figures connected with the group included Patrick, Lord Gibson, who joined the Oxford Mail in 1947 and became a Westminster Press director in 1948, and Iain Murray, 10th Duke of Atholl, who served as chairman from 1974 to 1993.

William Gibson, son of Patrick Gibson and Dione Pearson, was chairman and chief executive of Westminster Press from 1995 to 1996, the period in which Pearson prepared the sale of the business.

== Business model and operations ==
Westminster Press ran regional publishing houses that produced a daily newspaper and associated weekly titles. Production and printing were increasingly centralised in publishing houses serving multiple titles.

Matthews treats Westminster Press as an example of the corporatisation of the provincial press. In evidence to the 1977 Royal Commission on the Press, the company argued that group ownership helped newspapers survive in markets with different levels of advertising strength. It said advertising revenue per household could vary by "as much as 60%" between regions, with weaker areas including the North-West and North-East, and that group membership gave divisions access to training, management services and transferred plant.

The company also defended group ownership as compatible with local identity. It argued that local papers needed "each major community to be covered specifically, under separate editors" and that newspaper groups differed from the "uniformity of multiple retailing". Matthews contrasts this claim with the disruption caused when titles moved between large groups.

In 1977 Westminster Press Ltd was one of three wholly owned subsidiaries of Pearson Longman Limited, alongside the Financial Times Ltd and Longman Penguin Ltd. Matthews records that Westminster Press then published one morning newspaper, ten evening newspapers and an extensive range of weekly and free newspapers.

On industry measures Westminster Press ranked first among weekly provincial publishers in the 1960s and 1970s. In 1961, it had 50 titles with weekly circulation of 603,000. By 1974, this had grown to 94 titles and 1,234,000 weekly circulation, according to data derived from the Royal Commission on the Press.

The Stamford Mercury illustrated the effect of chain ownership on individual local titles. Westminster Press Provincial Newspapers bought the paper in 1929, after which, according to the paper's later historians quoted by Matthews, "its future was inextricably interwoven" with other newspapers owned by the parent company. Westminster Press later placed the paper under the management of the rival Lincolnshire Chronicle and moved printing away from Stamford before selling the title to EMAP in 1951.

== Journalism ==
The Northern Echo was Westminster Press’s best-known daily. Under editor Harold Evans from 1961 to 1967 it ran campaigns on air pollution on Teesside and on cervical cancer screening that drew national attention. Evans also pursued the Timothy Evans miscarriage-of-justice case while at the paper, which helped bring him to national attention.

The paper gave Westminster Press a national reputation for campaigning local journalism. Evans later became editor of The Sunday Times and then The Times.

== Industrial relations, 1977–1978 ==
In 1977 journalists at Westminster Press's Darlington centre began a dispute over a post-entry closed shop clause. A closed shop is an agreement under which employees must be members of a specified trade union as a condition of employment. The immediate trigger was the appointment of Josephine Kirk Smith as a sub-editor on the Darlington & Stockton Times. She refused to rejoin the National Union of Journalists and joined the Institute of Journalists instead. The NUJ chapel voted to strike by 44 votes to 34.

The dispute affected the Northern Echo, the Evening Despatch, the Darlington & Stockton Times and the Durham Advertiser series. It became part of a national argument about press freedom, trade union power and employment rights in journalism. In May 1977 Lord Gibson, a Westminster Press director and later chairman of Pearson, told the House of Lords that he had worked on Westminster Press for about 15 years after the war and argued that if newspaper managements conceded the NUJ closed shop, "possession of the NUJ card would amount to a licence to write in the Press".

The union side also presented the dispute as a question of bargaining power and pay. The Spectator reported that some striking journalists earned £40 a week and some trainees £30 a week, and quoted one striker saying: "We're fighting for bargaining power, nothing more." In the House of Commons, supporters of the closed shop argued that Westminster Press was one of the largest newspaper chains and that the dispute involved 108 NUJ members at North of England Newspapers.

By 1 December 1977 The Times reported that the stoppage had "lasted nearly six months" and that the papers had not been published for about four months after printing workers refused to cross NUJ picket lines. Before Christmas the Northern Echo appeared with a skeleton staff and "was produced by four executives and a district reporter" while "106 journalists" remained on strike. On 6 January 1978 The Times reported that "the original demand for a closed shop will not be conceded". Reuters then reported a vote to end the 32-week stoppage and accept a new pay deal at the Northern Echo and three sister papers.

== Sale to Newsquest ==
Pearson began a sale process in June 1996. At the time, The Independent described Westminster Press as a "chain of 60 newspapers, including the Northern Echo, the Brighton Evening Argus and the Oxford Mail" and reported that it could fetch up to £300 million. Pearson finance director John Makinson said: "When we looked around the group, trying to decide which links with other Pearson assets made sense, Westminster Press did not really fit."

On 5 August 1996 Newsquest announced that it had bought Westminster Press for £305 million. Contemporary coverage noted that Newsquest was backed by KKR, with Cinven taking a significant minority stake after closing. The Monopolies and Mergers Commission later decided that the acquisition would not be expected to operate against the public interest, and completion followed in 1997.

Matthews places the sale within a wider period of consolidation in regional newspapers: Thomson sold its English newspapers to Trinity in 1995, Reed Regional Newspapers became Newsquest through a management buyout, Newsquest later acquired Westminster Press, and by 2006 the four largest regional newspaper groups owned 65 per cent of titles. In 1999 Newsquest was bought by Gannett.

== Titles ==
The following list summarises selected titles documented under Westminster Press. It is not exhaustive.

Title	Place	Type	Founded	In Westminster Press	One-line history or notable episode	Ref.
The Northern Echo	Darlington, County Durham	Morning daily	1870	Listed among Westminster Press titles in 1996 sale reporting	Known for campaigning reporting under Harold Evans in the 1960s; affected by the 1977–78 closed-shop dispute	
Evening Despatch	Darlington, County Durham	Evening daily	—	Named among titles affected in the 1977 dispute at the Darlington centre	Publication suspended during the 1977–78 stoppage	
Darlington & Stockton Times	Darlington/North Yorkshire	Weekly	1847	Named among titles affected in the 1977 dispute	The appointment of Josephine Kirk Smith as sub-editor triggered the 1977–78 dispute	
Durham Advertiser series	County Durham	Weekly series	1814	Named among titles affected in the 1977 dispute	Part of the Darlington group during the closed-shop dispute	
Evening Argus	Brighton, East Sussex	Evening daily	1880s	Listed among Westminster Press titles in 1996 sale reporting	Principal evening paper for Brighton and Hove	
Oxford Mail	Oxford, Oxfordshire	Daily	1928	Listed among Westminster Press titles in 1996 sale reporting	Patrick Gibson joined the title as a trainee journalist in 1947 before becoming a Westminster Press director	
Stamford Mercury	Stamford, Lincolnshire	Weekly	1695	Bought in 1929; later sold in 1951	Management centralised to the Lincolnshire Chronicle; printing moved; sold to EMAP	
Lincolnshire Chronicle	Lincoln, Lincolnshire	Weekly	1832	In group by early 1950s	Acted as managerial centre over the Stamford Mercury before its sale	
Slough Evening Mail	Slough, Berkshire	Evening daily	1969	Joint launch with Thomson; counted half to each group in 1974 data	One of the late-1960s new evening papers around London	
Telegraph & Argus	Bradford, West Yorkshire	Evening daily, later daily	1868	Identified with Westminster Press portfolio	Key title in Yorkshire; associated weeklies in the Bradford district	

== Sources and archives ==
Company records are held at The National Archives under "Westminster Press Ltd" and "Westminster Press Provincial Newspapers Ltd". A company booklet, The Westminster Press: Provincial Newspapers (1952) by A. P. Duncum, provides a primary-source overview.
