= Sam Pearson =

Sam Pearson may refer to:

- Sam Pearson (Emmerdale)
- Sam Pearson (footballer)

== See also ==
- Samuel Pearson, English entrepreneur and founder of Pearson plc
