= John Hyslop Bell =

Scottish journalist, newspaper owner and editor

John Hyslop Bell (c. 1833–1920) was a Scottish journalist, newspaper owner and editor.

== Life ==
Born in Scotland, he made his name as proprietor and editor of the South Durham Mercury in Hartlepool, which was at the time, County Durham's only morning newspaper. In 1870, at the request of the powerful Pease family in Darlington, he founded The Northern Echo, ostensibly to counter the rhetoric of rival papers, the Darlington & Stockton Times and the Darlington Mercury.

A stalwart Liberal and Gladstonian, and a formidable journalist in his own right, he gained prominence within the Liberal Party through his tireless efforts for the causes of industrial arbitration and education, and was an early advocate of Irish Home Rule.

Arguably, Bell's greatest contribution to journalism lay in his discovery of W. T. Stead, whom he installed as editor of The Northern Echo in 1871 at the age of just 22. When Stead left to join the Pall Mall Gazette in 1880, Bell's search for a suitable replacement was only partially successful and, perhaps frustrated by this, or troubled by discontent within the Liberal Party itself, he severed ties with the Echo in 1889. Thereafter, he seems to have hit on hard times, and in 1894, a £3000 fund was raised for him by the Liberal Party in appreciation of his "great public services during his long connection with journalism in the North of England."

In 1897, Bell became coroner for Stockton-on-Tees, He died in 1920.
