= John Fallon (businessman) =

British businessman

- Born: John Joseph Fallon; August 1962 (age 62)
- Education: University of Hull
- Occupation: Business executive
- Title: CEO, Pearson plc
- Term: 2013-2020
- Predecessor: Marjorie Scardino
- Children: 2 daughters

John Joseph Fallon (born August 1962) is a British businessman. He was the chief executive officer (CEO) of Pearson plc from 2013, succeeding Marjorie Scardino, until 2020. Pearson is one of the world's largest education brands.

== Early life ==
John Joseph Fallon was born in August 1962. He graduated from the University of Hull in 1983, with a bachelor's degree in economics, politics and sociology.

== Career ==
Fallon started his career as a researcher for Labour politician John Prescott in 1988. He was the director of corporate affairs at Powergen, now known as E.ON UK, from 1992 to 1997.

He became the director of communications of Pearson in 1997. He was on the board of directors of Interactive Data Corporation from 2000 to 2007. In 2010, he became the international education chief executive. He has been the CEO of Pearson since 2013, replacing Marjorie Scardino. In 2013, he decided to close the adult education unit in the UK, Pearson in Practice, which provided apprenticeships to put adults back to work, as it was unprofitable. Fallon undertook a significant restructuring during his tenure at the head of Pearson.

Fallon announced plans to retire in 2020 after a successor had been appointed. Andy Bird was selected as the new CEO, he took over on 19 October. Fallon remains an advisor to Pearson.

== Personal life ==
Fallon is married and has two daughters.
