= The Georgia Gazette =

18th Century newspaper in Georgia, US

- Type: Alternative newspaper
- Owner(s): Marjorie Scardino and Albert Scardino
- Founded: 1978
- Ceased publication: 1985
- Language: English
- City: Savannah, Georgia
- ISSN: 0730-1138
- OCLC number: 7949651

The Georgia Gazette was a weekly alternative newspaper in Savannah, Georgia, which took its name from Georgia's first newspaper, also founded in Savannah, in 1763. Its owners and publishers were Marjorie Scardino and Albert Scardino. It was awarded a Pulitzer Prize for Editorial Writing in 1984, the first time in twenty years that such a prize had been bestowed on a weekly newspaper. Despite this recognition, however, the newspaper became financially infeasible to publish and closed in 1985. Albert Scardino went on to write for The New York Times, and Marjorie Scardino later became CEO of Pearson PLC.
