= Darlington & Stockton Times =

Weekly newspaper in North Yorkshire, Durham and Tees-side

- Darlington & Stockton Times front page
- Type: Regional weekly newspaper
- Format: Compact
- Owner(s): Gannett Company
- Founder(s): George Brown
- Editor: Hannah Chapman
- Founded: 1847; 178 years ago in Barnard Castle
- Language: English
- Headquarters: Priestgate, Darlington
- City: Darlington
- Country: UK
- Circulation: 7,690 (as of 2024)
- Website: Official website

The Darlington & Stockton Times is a British, regional, weekly, paid for, newspaper covering the Richmond - Darlington - Stokesley - Thirsk - Leyburn area. It is published in Darlington by Newsquest Media Group Ltd, a subsidiary of Gannett Company Inc. Three separate editions are published for County Durham, North Yorkshire and Cleveland.

A substantial proportion of Darlington & Stockton Times readers live in rural areas, and it contains information and news relating to farming issues.

It was one of the last UK newspapers to devote its front page entirely to adverts; a practice that persisted until 1997. Compact format replaced broadsheet in 2009.

== History ==
=== Title ===
The Darlington & Stockton Times was first published with four broadsheet pages, on a single sheet, in 1847 as the:

Darlington & Stockton Times and Barnard-Castle, Richmond, Auckland, Middlesbrough, Hartlepool, Teesdale and Swaledale Journal.

That was soon changed to:

Darlington & Stockton Times and Barnard-Castle, Richmond, Auckland, Middlesbrough, Hartlepool, Teesdale and Swaledale Journal and South Durham and North Yorkshire Advertiser

before in 1894, the full title became:

Darlington & Stockton Times and Barnard-Castle, Richmond, Auckland, Middlesbrough, Hartlepool, Teesdale and Swaledale Journal and South Durham and North Yorkshire Advertiser and Ripon and Richmond Chronicle.

=== Objectives ===
Before publication, Brown advertised the newspaper would

..labour to promote the diffusion of liberal principles, and the progress of peaceful and enlightened measures for the removal of national Abuses, and for securing the just Rights and Privileges of all men and the safety and welfare of the Country... Our views are in favour of Peace, Temperance, a reformed criminal code, thorough Sanitary Regulations, and the Extension of unfettered Education to all.

— George Brown, 1847

In the event, page one of the first edition contained only auction news, insurance and general advertisements. Meetings of the Darlington Abstinence Society and Stockton Institute of Literature and Science filled page two, but it sold out.

=== Ownership ===
1847	Liberal philanthropist and barrister, George Brown established the newspaper, with printer Henry Atkinson, in Barnard Castle. He employed Henry King Spark as a compositor, and subsequently moved the newspaper to the better connected and larger market of Darlington.
1849	George Brown moved back to Barnard Castle and sold his newspaper to property developers Robert and William Thompson.
1864	The Thompsons' business failed and their newspaper was purchased by the now wealthy Henry King Spark. He used it in his bids to establish Darlington as a parliamentary borough, and be its first mayor and member of parliament. Darlington became a borough and Spark embarrassed the powerful, liberal Pease family but he was not elected to either position. In 1870, liberals, including the Pease family, established the Northern Echo to counter the Darlington & Stockton Times' influence in Darlington.
1878	Spark was declared bankrupt and title passed to the rival, liberal faction led by Northern Echo publisher John Hyslop Bell, and the Pease family.
c. 1885	Mirroring a split in the Liberal Party, the newspaper's directors disagreed over its position on home rule for Ireland. Those favouring home rule were bought out by the unionist Arthur Pease's faction. The Darlington & Stockton Times supported Pease's 1895 campaign to become Tory aligned Liberal Unionist MP for Darlington. Pease ousted the Northern Echo supported Liberal Theodore Fry from the seat.
1914	Arnold Rowntree and Charles Starmer controlled, liberal aligned and Northern Echo owning, North of England Newspaper Company Ltd purchased the Darlington & Stockton Times. The newspaper retained its unionist voice.
1921	North of England Newspapapers Company Ltd purchased by Charles Starmer and Pearson's, King and Hutchings Ltd. King and Hutchings Ltd subsequently renamed Westminster Press Ltd.
1937	Pearson take complete control of Westminster Press Ltd.
1969	Pearson plc floated on the London Stock Exchange.
1995	Westminster Press Ltd sold by Pearson plc to Newsquest Media Group Ltd.
1999	Newsquest Media Group Ltd purchased by Gannett Company Inc.
2019	GateHouse Media purchased Gannett Company Inc, and subsequently took the name of its acquisition.

=== Location ===
1847	Horsemarket, Barnard Castle	54.5440°N 1.9245°W
1848	Bennett House / Central Hall, Darlington	54.5240°N 1.5547°W
1866	Purpose built premises in Salt Yard, Darlington	54.5263°N 1.5580°W
1931	Priestgate, Darlington	54.5259°N 1.5529°W

=== Circulation ===
Weekly ABC circulation for second half of year:

1923		25,927
2011		22,369
2012	▼	21,117
2013	▼	20,072
2014	▼	18,743
2015	▼	17,341
2016	▼	15,538
2017	▼	14,214
2018	▼	13,117

== ISSN ==
The Darlington & Stockton Times regional edition ISSN codes are:

- 1470-4305, North Yorkshire
- 1470-4307, County Durham
- 1470-4323, Cleveland
