= Daniel Sotomayor =

Gay political cartoonist in the United States

- Born: August 30, 1958
- Died: February 5, 1992 (aged 33); Chicago, Illinois
- Cause of death: AIDS complications
- Resting place: Rosehill Cemetery, Chicago, Illinois
- Education: Columbia College Chicago
- Occupations: cartoonist, activist
- Known for: cofounder of ACT-UP/Chicago
- Partner: Scott McPherson

Daniel Sotomayor (August 30, 1958 — February 5, 1992) was the first openly gay political cartoonist in the United States for various newspapers throughout the country, such as Chicago's Windy City Times, and the cofounder of the AIDS Coalition to Unleash Power organization's branch in Chicago (ACT-UP/Chicago).

== Personal life ==
With Mexican and Puerto Rican parents, Daniel grew up in Humboldt Park, Chicago. Though he faced a turbulent childhood, he was surrounded by creativity and art from an early age. Once he moved out, he studied acting at the Center Theatre and enrolled in the American Academy of Art College. He appeared in a handful of plays, including a rendition of "It's A Wonderful Town". After acting, he enrolled at Columbia College Chicago where he obtained a degree in graphic design which he used to start his career as an artist. However, in 1988, he was diagnosed with AIDS at 30 years old. Thus began his venture into politics and activism as he worked with various organizations, news outlets, and key political members to spread education/awareness about the AIDS epidemic.

He was partnered to playwright Scott McPherson, who wrote the off-Broadway play “Marvin’s Room" which was later adapted into a feature film.

Sotomayor was hospitalized in January 1992. After a long battle with AIDS complications, he died on February 5, 1992, at the Illinois Masonic Hospital. He was surrounded by friends and family; notably McPherson, the activist Michael Petrelis, and his caregiver/fellow activist Lori Cannon who say he fought until his last breath. Sotomayor was interred at Rosehill Cemetery following a mass of Christian burial; close friends held a private memorial a few weeks later in accordance with his wishes.

== Career ==
=== ACT-UP/Chicago ===
In 1988, Daniel joined the Chicagoans for AIDS Rights which eventually led to his involvement with ACT UP, an organization founded in New York with a goal to spread awareness about the AIDS crisis. Being at the head of ACT-UP's Chicago branch, he phoned government officials to enact lasting changes, advertisement networks to get them to promote his team's sexual education posters, and community leaders to organize marches.

During Sotomayor's time with ACT-UP/Chicago, he orchestrated many "zaps" in which he would call out public figures and advocate for safer sex education for the youth. In 1990, his most notable "zap" consisted of making his way to the top of Chicago's Cook County Building and displaying a flag that read "We Demand Equal Healthcare Now". He was arrested for this stunt and lost his job at the news publication (Windy City Times) he had been producing cartoons for.

Tension started to arise within the ACT-UP/Chicago as members believed that Sotomayor was taking too much credit and gaining too much power in the organization. He protested with calling out the organization's lack of focus on AIDS; he claimed they were becoming too broad by focusing on many human right's issues all at once leading to no lasting change. Sotomayor stated in an interview that ACT-UP/Chicago had placed AIDS activism's importance, "after racism, sexism, and homophobia". He quit in 1990.

=== Political cartoons ===
Soon after his entry into the activist scene and coupled with his continued love for drawing, journalist/activist Paul Adams helped him land a regular position as a cartoonist for Windy City Times. He quickly became divisive and highly talked about in the political sphere surrounding the Chicago area, even beyond. This national praise and interest in his politics led him to have featured spots in other gay news sources throughout New York and California. He became, according to journalist and founder of The Legacy Project Chicago Victor Salvo, "the first (and only) openly gay and openly HIV-positive political cartoonist in the United States, possibly the world."

He produced over 150 cartoons for various editorials.

His cartoons consisted of sarcastic tones embedded in caricatured versions of public officials, community leaders, and government members. He criticized health departments, the law, insurance companies, and even the LGBT+ community (specifically their tendency to fight with one another when the battle, to Sotomayor, required unity).

In one of his earliest cartoons made in 1989, which propelled him into a higher echelon of political importance, he calls out George Bush (the President of the United States at the time). In the cartoon, the President is reading a newspaper with the headline "100,000 Diagnosed with AIDS in the U.S." The First Lady, Barbara, asks him if there is anything important in the paper. Bush replies with, "nope." This sparked a lot of controversy and many were shocked at his audacity to call out the President of the United States.

His last cartoons, made during 1990–1991, focused more on the looming threat of death, for both himself and his peers. There were cartoons detailing his anger at unsupportive families of gay men in Shame (1990), the ignorance behind the only available treatment medication AZT and its negative (plus deadly) effects on people with AIDS in Genocide (1990), and the LGBTQ+ youth's incomprehension towards the damage AIDS was still continuing to pose in Same Old Excuses (1991).

=== Cure AIDS Now ===
After parting with ACT UP, he joined the direct-action group Cure AIDS Now which solely concerned AIDS awareness and safer sex education. He continued to demand government officials to act on various AIDS-related legislature and strived to feature safe-sex posters in mainstream outlets.

In 1991, he planned and carried out a stunt at the Impact Gala, an LGBT Rights PAC. At this particular event, the mayor of Chicago, Richard M. Daley, was to be in attendance. Daniel gathered a group, including members working for security, to help him infiltrate into the hotel and run up to Daley. He quickly flashed a handmade sign reading "DALEY TELL THE TRUTH ABOUT AIDS" while his picture was taking by someone working with him. He was rushed out of the building by security but the statement had been successfully made.

== Awards and recognition ==
While Daniel was at the hospital in February 1992, he was awarded the Alongi Award for his never-ending, fierce activism.

Sotomayor was inducted, posthumously, into the Chicago LGBT Hall of Fame in 1992.

He was added to the AIDS Memorial Quilt in 1992, which remembers key figures in the fight against AIDS

In 2017, The Legacy Project remembered Daniel Sotomayor and his story in a documentary titled Short Fuse: The Story of AIDS Activist Daniel Sotomayor.

The Smithsonian Museum honored his legacy in their 2022 exhibition "Presente! A Latino History of the United States" with photographs of him.

"The Outrage of Danny Sotomayor" premiered in November 2023 on the WTTW program Chicago Stories.
