= Andy Bird =

British executive (born 1964)

Andy Bird CBE (born 3 January 1964) is a British executive and chairman of FuboTV. He was chairman of Walt Disney International until 2018. Bird was the CEO of Pearson plc from October 2020 until 8 January 2024.

== Early life ==
Bird was born and raised in Warrington, Lancashire, England and was educated at King's School, Macclesfield. In 1985, Bird gained a Bachelor of Arts degree in English language and literature at Newcastle University.

== Career ==
Bird first started his career in broadcasting as one of Timmy Mallett's helpers on Manchester's Piccadilly Radio. He produced the breakfast show. He later moved to London working for Richard Branson's Virgin Broadcasting, working on their music television channel Music Box and satellite radio station 'Radio Radio'. Next was British Satellite Broadcasting's The Power Station channel.

In 1990, Bird and Chris Evans formed company Big and Good that made programmes for TVam.

Bird joined Time Warner in 1994 as senior vice president and general manager of Turner Entertainment Networks Limited. In 2000, he became president of TBS International and was responsible for all TBS broadcasting outside of the United States.

=== Disney ===
In 2004, Bird joined The Walt Disney Company and has since overseen the acquisition of Hungama TV in India and investment in India's UTV. He also localizes content and has reorganized Disney's international structure and leadership ranks.

Bird was appointed Commander of the Most Excellent Order of the British Empire (CBE) in the 2012 Birthday Honours for services to UK media and entertainment.

=== Pearson ===
Bird was selected as CEO of Pearson plc to replace the retiring John Fallon and had been with the company since October 2020. He retired in January 2024, and was replaced by Omar Abbosh.

=== FuboTV ===
In 2026, Andy Bird became chairman of FuboTV, an American streaming service.

== Personal life ==
Bird is married and has two sons.
