= Emilie Peacocke =

British journalist

- Born: Emilie Marshall; 26 March 1882; Darlington
- Died: 25 January 1964 (aged 81); Kensington
- Known for: first women reporter at the Daily Express, top woman at The Daily Telegraph

Emilie Hawkes Peacocke, born Emilie Marshall (26 March 1882 – 25 January 1964), was a British journalist. She was the first woman reporter at the Daily Express and later, top woman editor at The Daily Telegraph.

== Life ==
Peacocke was born in 1882 in Darlington. Her parents were Mildred and John Marshall and she was their first child. The house was devoted to journalism. Her mother was from a journalist family as her mother's father edited the Newcastle Chronicle. Emilie's father was co-proprietor and editor of the Northern Echo. In time she would have five siblings.

The Northern Echo was a liberal paper and her upbringing was liberal. She was taught at home and she was allowed free rein in choosing her own reading. Her hero was Jessie White Mario whom she knew due to connections from her family. By the age of fifteen she was proofreading the Northern Echo using her skills. She was promoted and she later recorded how she was smug as she cycled home at three in the morning knowing that she knew the news that others would not know until the read the paper she had helped to create.

In 1903 the family were in London when her father died. He had lost his job in Darlington when he refused to support the newspaper's line in support of the war in South Africa. The family were short of money and she was obliged to find work. She had failed to find work because she was a woman in Darlington and the prejudice continued in London. Newspapers employed women but usually just one and they could not see why they might need two. Peacocke became a reporter for the Church Family Newspaper where her gender still caused issues as women were not allowed into some church meetings.

She became the first woman reporter at the Daily Express where she was paid the same as a man. She won a pay rise after she gained a scoop by obtaining a copy of the new hymn book. The book contained new hymns and controversially excluded some well known hymns.

In 1929 she led the "women's department" at The Daily Telegraph. That January she was invited to a dinner to honour Lady Rhondda which included many of the leading women in Britain at that time. Other invitees were Vera Brittain, Rebecca West, Edith Shackleton, and Cicely Hamilton.

In 1936 she wrote Writing for Women.

She worked at the Telegraph until 1941.

== Death and legacy ==
Peacocke died at her home in Kensington which she shared with her daughter Marguerite D. Peacocke who was also a leading journalist. Her life story was featured in a BBC Radio 4 dramatisation of her life in 1999.
