= Scott McPherson =

American playwright (1959–1992)

- Born: October 13, 1959; Columbus, Ohio, U.S.
- Died: November 7, 1992 (aged 33); Chicago, Illinois, U.S.
- Education: Ohio University
- Occupation: Playwright

Scott McPherson (October 13, 1959 Columbus, Ohio – November 7, 1992 Chicago) was an American playwright. He was influential as one of the first openly gay playwrights when AIDS was severely impacting the nation.

== Early life ==
McPherson, whose father died in a car accident when he was two, was raised by his mother, who worked part-time in a department store, in a predominantly Roman Catholic home in Columbus, Ohio. Many of Mcpherson's plays were influenced by his experiences in his youth caring for ill and dying family members, which revolved around the inevitability of dying, but he transformed his experiences into comedic and eloquent works.

== Life ==
He graduated from Ohio University. In 1981, he moved to Chicago, where he acted in The House of Blue Leaves and "The Normal Heart", where he met actor and Pulitzer Prize-nominated playwright Steven Drukman with whom he lived for three years. He joined the play writing group Chicago New Plays. His partner at the time of his death was activist and cartoonist Daniel Sotomayor. He died of complications from AIDS on November 7, 1992, aged 33.

Ohio University named a new theater space for him. The Goodman Theatre and the Victory Gardens Theater have established an annual playwriting award in his name.

== Family ==
The son of Leo McPherson and Peggy Sansbury, he had the following siblings: Bret and Mark McPherson, Steve Sansbury, Hugh Sansbury, Susan MacDowell, Ellen Oatney and Cathy Hargett.

== Awards ==
- 1991 Whiting Award
- 1992 Drama Desk Award for Outstanding Play
- Oppenheimer Award
- Obie Award
- Outer Critics Circle Award
- Induction into the Chicago Gay and Lesbian Hall of Fame (in 1992).

== Works ==
- Til the Fat Lady Sings Ohio University
- Scraped Organic Theatre 1986
- Marvin's Room Goodman Theatre 1990

=== Screenplay ===
- Marvin's Room (film, 1996)
- Legal Briefs
