= Arnold Goodman, Baron Goodman =

British lawyer and political adviser (1913–1995)

The Right Honourable The Lord Goodman CH
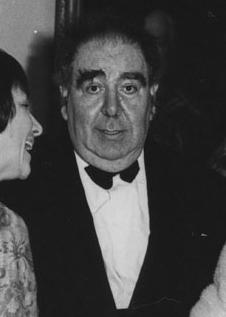
- Lord Goodman, 1974

Chairman of the Arts Council of Great Britain
- In office 1965–1972
- Preceded by: The Lord Cottesloe
- Succeeded by: Patrick Gibson

Member of the House of Lords Lord Temporal
- In office 20 July 1965 – 12 May 1995; Life Peerage

Personal details
- Born: Aby Goodman; 21 August 1913 London, England
- Died: 12 May 1995 (aged 81) London, England
- Party: None (crossbencher)
- Education: University College London; Downing College, Cambridge
- Occupation: Lawyer and political adviser
- Known for: Chairman of the Arts Council of Great Britain; Master of University College, Oxford

Arnold Abraham Goodman, Baron Goodman, CH (21 August 1913 – 12 May 1995) was a British lawyer and political adviser. In addition to his work as a lawyer in London, he served as chairman of the Arts Council of Great Britain from 1965 until 1972. He was master of University College, Oxford from 1976 to 1986.

== Early life and education ==
Arnold Goodman was born at Hackney, London, son of Jewish parents Joseph Goodman (1879/80–1940), a master draper, and Bertha (1887–1959), daughter of Joseph Mauerberger, owner of a Stepney drapery business. His first name was given on his birth certificate as "Aby", which was later corrected by his father to Abraham in 1931; Goodman himself took the name Arnold as his first name during the Second World War. The Goodman family were comfortably prosperous, as Goodman described in profiles. He was educated at Hackney Downs School (formerly The Grocers' Company School), a boys' school run by London County Council. He studied law at University College London, graduating with a second class honours Bachelor of Laws (LLB) degree in 1933. He later undertook further studies in Roman law and Roman-Dutch law at Downing College, Cambridge.

== Career ==
=== Legal career ===
He qualified as a solicitor, and became a leading London lawyer as Senior Partner in the law firm Goodman, Derrick & Co (subsequently Goodman Derrick LLP and now RWK Goodman LLP).

Publisher Rupert Hart-Davis was a client when Goodman was a partner in Rubenstein Nash; Goodman reached an agreement with Winston Churchill and Lord Beaverbrook over G. M. Young's life of Stanley Baldwin in 1952, though it required the "hideously expensive" job of removing and replacing seven leaves with revised wording in 7,580 copies of the book. In 1963, Goodman (now in his own firm, Goodman Derrick) arranged for Granada Television to take over Hart-Davis's loss-making publishing firm and Hart-Davis "wasn't surprised when he became a leading trouble-shooter for the government". After hearing details of the firm's finances for ten or fifteen minutes Goodman dictated everything back to his secretary: "the most amazing feat of mental agility I've ever seen or heard of".

=== Public service ===
Lord Goodman was chairman of the Arts Council of Great Britain from 1965 until 1972, succeeded by Lord Gibson. As chair of the Arts Council, Goodman managed the organisation's 'golden age' with the establishing of the South Bank Centre and adoption of the only UK government bill for the Arts while the Council began regular funding for a number of galleries and theatre companies in the English regions. He was also chairman of British Lion Films, the Committee of Inquiry into Charity Law, the Committee on London Orchestras, the Housing Corporation, the National Building Agency, the Newspaper Proprietors' Association, and The Observer Trust, as well as being Director of the Royal Opera House and Sadler's Wells, Governor of the Royal Shakespeare Theatre, a member of the Planning Committee for the Open University and President of the Theatrical Advisory Committee. He was a Senior Fellow of the Royal College of Art and an Honorary Fellow of the Royal College of Art. He was also a founder and patron of the Next Century Foundation. He was awarded an Honorary Degree (Doctor of Laws) by the University of Bath in 1976. On 7 November of the same year, he formally opened the British Music Information Centre (BMIC).

In 1977, Goodman founded the Motability scheme for disabled motorists with Jeffrey Sterling.

=== Academic career ===
Later in his career, Lord Goodman was Master of University College, Oxford, succeeding Lord Redcliffe-Maud in 1976. He retired from the post in 1986.

=== House of Lords ===
On 20 July 1965, Goodman was created a life peer as Baron Goodman, of the City of Westminster. He was introduced to the House of Lords on 21 July 1965. He sat in the Lords as a crossbencher. He made his maiden speech on 9 December 1965 during a debate on the Law Commission's First Programme.

== Personal life ==
He died from pneumonia on 12 May 1995.

== Criticisms ==
After Goodman's death one of his wealthy clients, Lord Portman, alleged that Goodman stole funds worth £10 million from his family's trust over a 30-year period and made donations to the Labour Party. Portman commenced legal proceedings for recovery but the claim was never substantiated, and the research of Goodman's biographer concluded that it had no substance.

Goodman was often portrayed by Private Eye as a sinister "power behind the throne" exerting huge influence on the British establishment. Private Eye often referred to him as Lord "Two Dinners" Goodman, a reference to his girth.

According to a documentary made by Richard Bond for Channel 4, The Gangster and the Pervert Peer, screened on 16 February 2009, Goodman, who never married, was one of the chief parties responsible for suppressing investigations by journalists which exposed how Lord Boothby and others were responsible for protecting the Krays from justice. Official MI5 records declassified on 22 October 2015 revealed that the association between the bisexual Boothby and the Kray twins had been the subject of an MI5 investigation in 1964.

== Honours ==
Goodman was created a life peer in the 1965 Queen's Birthday Honours. He was made a Member of the Order of the Companions of Honour (CH) in the 1972 Queen's Birthday Honours; this is a senior honour limited to a maximum of 65 members.

== Arms ==
Coat of arms of Arnold Goodman, Baron Goodman

Coronet
That of a Baron
Crest
On a cap of maintenance Gules turned up Ermine two hands couped at the wrists and clasped Proper.
Escutcheon
Azure a chevron wavy Argent between in chief two lyres and in base a torch enflamed Proper.
Supporters
Dexter a carrier pigeon, sinister a seagull, Proper about the neck of each a chain suspended therefrom a lyre Or.
Motto
Tout Comprendre C'Est Tout Pardonner (To Understand All Is To Pardon All)

== Publications ==
- Not For the Record selected speeches and writings (1972).
- Tell Them I'm On My Way memoirs (1993).

== Offices held ==
Government offices
Preceded by Lord Cottesloe	Chair of the Arts Council of Great Britain; 1965–1972	Succeeded by Lord Gibson
Academic offices
Preceded by John Redcliffe-Maud	Master of University College, Oxford; 1976–1986	Succeeded by Kingman Brewster

== Sources ==
- The Oxford Dictionary of National Biography (includes photograph)
- Goodman's obituary in the Galton Institute
- Criticism of Goodman
- Goodman's obituary in The New York Times
- Goodman allegations, The Guardian
- Goodman commentary, Times Higher Education
