= Arts Council of Great Britain =

UK official body to support the arts

The Arts Council of Great Britain was a non-departmental public body dedicated to the promotion of the fine arts in Great Britain. It was divided in 1994 to form the Arts Council of England (now Arts Council England), the Scottish Arts Council (later merged into Creative Scotland), and the Arts Council of Wales. At the same time the National Lottery was established and these three arts councils, plus the Arts Council of Northern Ireland, became distribution bodies.

== History ==
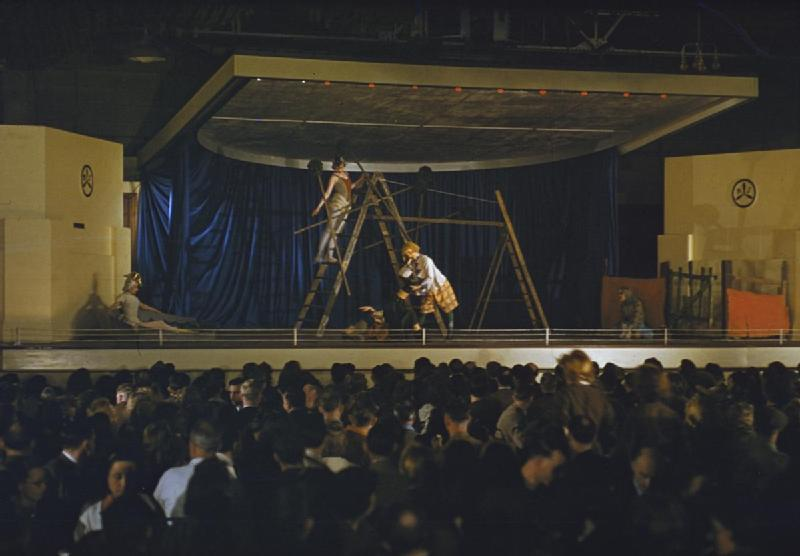
Dancers from the Ballet Rambert under the auspices of CEMA perform Peter and The Wolf at an aircraft factory in the Midlands during World War II

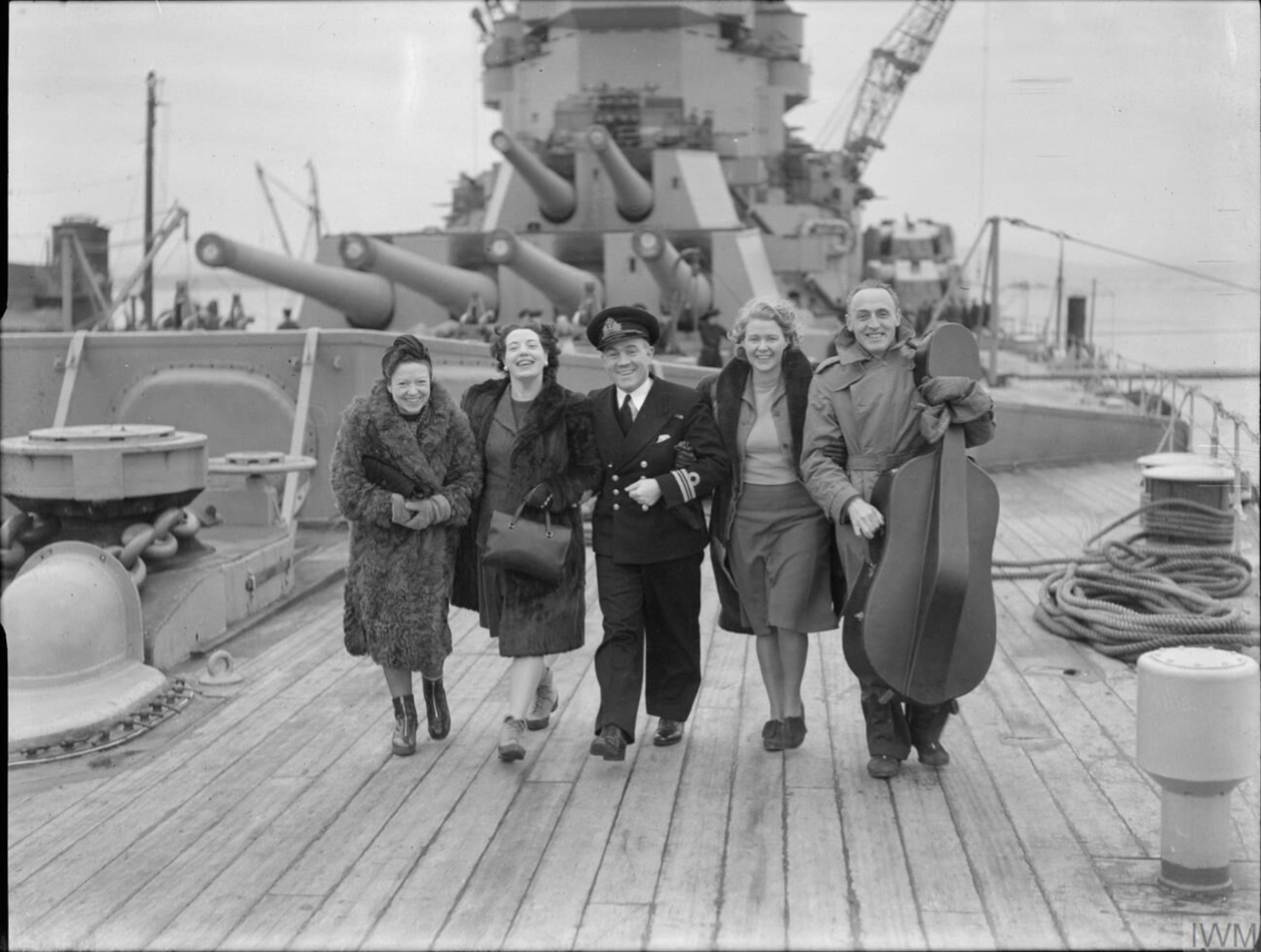
CEMA performers and Royal Navy officer aboard HMS Duke of York during World War II

In January 1940, during the Second World War, the Council for the Encouragement of Music and the Arts (CEMA) was appointed to help promote and maintain British culture. Chaired by Lord De La Warr, President of the Board of Education, the council was government-funded and after the war was renamed the Arts Council of Great Britain. Reginald Jacques was appointed musical director, with Sir Henry Walford Davies and George Dyson also involved. John Denison took over after the war.

A royal charter was granted on 9 August 1946, after Keynes's death, followed by another in 1967. The latter provided for functions in Scotland and Wales to be conducted by two committees known as the Scottish and Welsh Arts Councils – the basis for the later Scottish Arts Council and Arts Council of Wales.

Sir Ernest Pooley became chairman in 1946. The council's intended first chairman was John Maynard Keynes who used his influence in government to secure a high level of funding despite Britain's poor finances. The majority of this funding was directed to organisations with which Keynes had close ties such as the Royal Opera House and was restricted to Central London. Keynes used his political influence to ensure that the Arts Council reported directly to the Treasury rather than an arts minister or the education department as had been the case with CEMA, establishing the principle of an 'arms length' relationship between UK arts policy and the government of the day.

After Keynes' death in April 1946 government funding was reduced but the Arts Council received wide recognition for its contribution to the Festival of Britain thanks to Sir Kenneth Clark who became chairman in 1953. Artworks commissioned by the council for the festival were retained to form the basis of the Arts Council Collection. The Arts Council commissioned 12 sculptors and 60 painters, who made large paintings, 114 by 152 centimetres (45 by 60 in) or more, to be displayed at the festival. Ultimately the works were to be given to new hospitals, libraries, schools, and health centres that emerged after the war. There were five cash prizes awarded: Robert Adams's Apocalyptic Figure, Elinor Bellingham-Smith's The Island, Lucian Freud's Interior near Paddington, William Gear's Autumn Landscape, and Robert MacBryde's Figure and Still Life.

Under the Harold Wilson government of 1964–70 the Arts Council enjoyed a Golden Age thanks to the close relationship between chairman Arnold Goodman and the arts minister Jennie Lee. This period saw the council establish a network of arts organisations across the country as regular client organisations and a programme of touring exhibitions and performances. To support the council’s responsibilities in relation to the visual arts, it opened the Hayward Gallery on London's South Bank in 1968 as a home for its major exhibitions and the base for the Arts Council Collection. Since 1987, the gallery has been independently managed by the South Bank Centre. In 2003 sculpture in the collection was moved to a base in Yorkshire.

During the 1970s and 1980s the Arts Council came under attack for being elitist and politically biased, in particular from the prominent Conservative Party minister Norman Tebbit. The government grant to the council was capped effecting a real-terms reduction in funding, though it was argued that any shortfall would be made up by increased sponsorship from the private sector. The secretary-general from 1975 to 1983, Roy Shaw, the last secretary-general to be knighted, faced the difficult task of reconciling the needs of arts organisations with the restricted funding. William Rees-Mogg was a political appointment as chairman and proposed slimming down the council's responsibilities. This led to a series of clashes with prominent figures from the arts such as Peter Hall, who resigned from the council in protest. In 1987 the restructure inspired by Rees-Mogg cut by half the number of organisations receiving Arts Council funding. During the same period the Arts Council began encouraging a greater level of corporate sponsorship for the arts.

On 1 April 1994 it was replaced by the Arts Council of England, the Scottish Arts Council, and the Arts Council of Wales, each with their own new Royal Charter; the Arts Council of Northern Ireland already existed as a distinct body. At the same time, the National Lottery was established and the Arts Council of England became one of the distribution bodies. For the first year after the change in organisation, the Arts Council of England acted to follow through on the final plans of the Arts Council of Great Britain.

== Chairpersons of the Arts Council ==
Chairman	Served
John Maynard Keynes, 1st Baron Keynes	1946
Sir Ernest Pooley	1946–1953
Sir Kenneth Clark	1953–1960
The 4th Baron Cottesloe	1960–1965
Baron Goodman	1965–1972
Patrick Gibson (created Baron Gibson in 1975)	1972–1977
Sir Kenneth Robinson	1977–1982
Sir William Rees-Mogg	1982–1989
Peter Palumbo (created Baron Palumbo in 1991)	1989–1994
