= Marjorie Scardino =

American-born British businesswoman (born 1947)

Dame Marjorie Scardino DBE FRSA
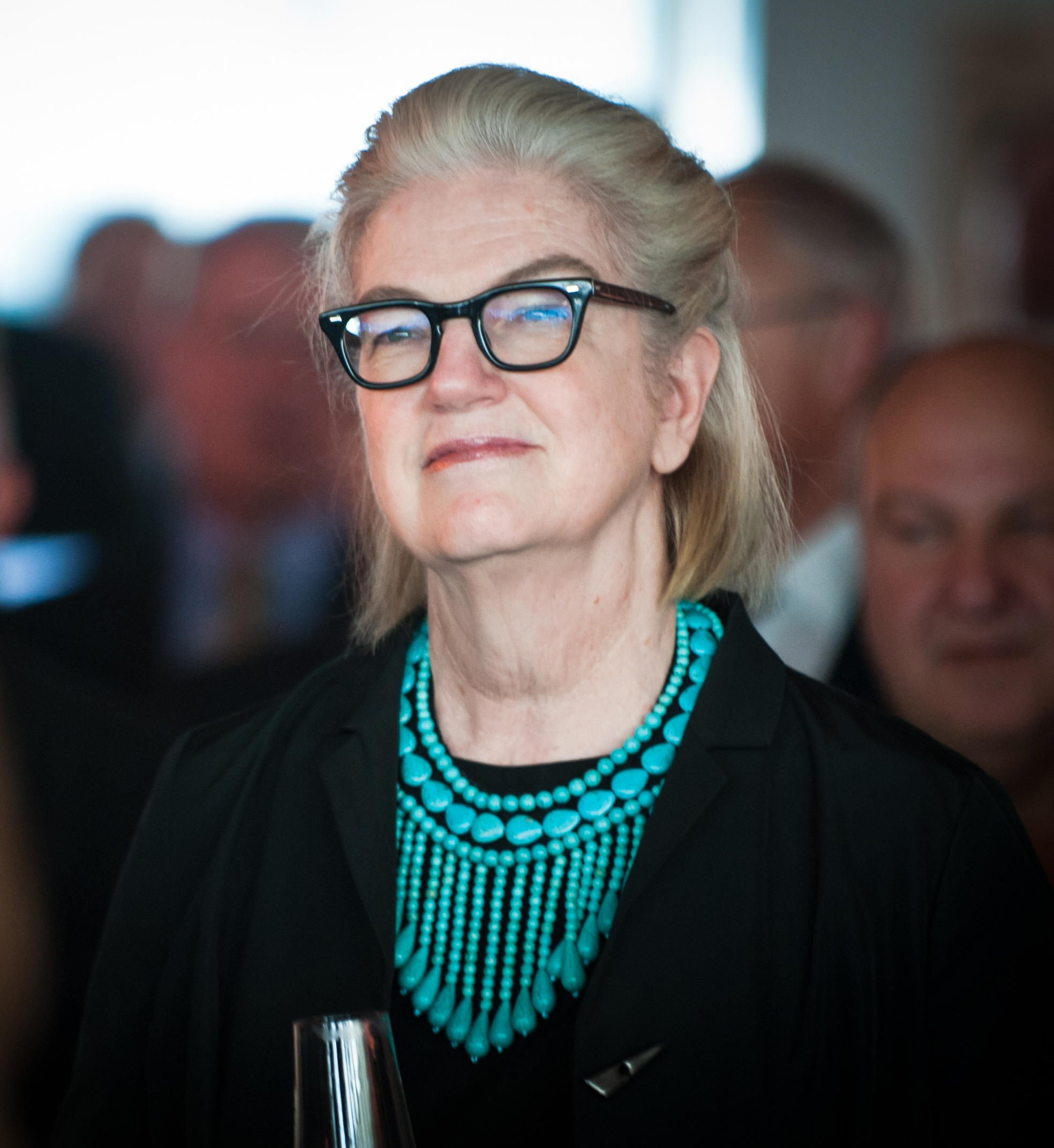
- Scardino in 2013
- Born: Marjorie Morris; 25 January 1947 (age 79); Flagstaff, Arizona, U.S.
- Citizenship: British
- Education: Baylor University; University of San Francisco School of Law
- Occupation: Chief executive
- Employer: Pearson plc
- Spouse: Albert Scardino
- Children: 3, including Hal Scardino
- Awards: Benjamin Franklin Medal

Dame Marjorie Scardino (née Morris; born 25 January 1947) is an American-born British business executive. She is a former CEO of Pearson PLC. Scardino became a trustee of Oxfam during her tenure at Pearson.

She was criticized by Private Eye magazine because, while Oxfam campaigns against corporate tax avoidance as part of the IF Coalition, Pearson was "a prolific tax haven user ... routing hundreds of millions of pounds through an elaborate series of Luxembourg companies (and a Luxembourg branch of a UK company) to avoid tax". She became the first female Chief Executive of a FTSE 100 company when she was appointed CEO of Pearson in 1997. She is also a non-executive director of Nokia and former CEO of the Economist Group. During her time at Pearson, Pearson's profits tripled, to a record £942m.

In December 2013, she joined the board of Twitter, Inc. as its first female director, after a controversy involving a lack of diversity on the Twitter board.

== Early life and education ==
Scardino was born in Flagstaff, Arizona, in 1947, and grew up in Texarkana, Texas. While living in Texas she participated in rodeo riding as a teenager. Scardino is a graduate of Baylor University with a B.A. degree in French and psychology in 1969. She began law school at George Washington University but dropped out to become a journalist at Associated Press in Charleston, West Virginia, and later obtained her J.D. degree from the University of San Francisco School of Law.

== Career ==
Before 1985, Scardino was the publisher of The Georgia Gazette.

She is the board chair of the MacArthur Foundation and a board member of the Carter Center. She is an Honorary Fellow of the Royal Society of Arts. She also won the 2002 Benjamin Franklin Medal.

In 2007, she was listed 17th on the Forbes list of the 100 most powerful women in the World.

On 3 October 2012, it was announced that Scardino would step down as CEO of Pearson, to be replaced by John Fallon.

Scardino served on Twitter's board from December 2013 until December 2018. She was the company's first female director.

== Personal life ==
Scardino is married to Albert Scardino, with whom she worked during her time at The Georgia Gazette and later a media reporter for The New York Times. She has three children, Adelaide, Will and Hal (producer and former child actor).

Although she was born in the United States, she has taken British citizenship.

== Awards and honors ==
Scardino received honorary doctorate from Brunel University in 1999, Heriot-Watt University in 2001, and the University of Roehampton in 2014.

She was named a Dame Commander of the Order of the British Empire (DBE) in February 2002, one month after she had adopted British citizenship.
