= Marvin's Room (film) =

1996 American drama film

- Theatrical release poster
- Directed by: Jerry Zaks
- Screenplay by: Scott McPherson; John Guare
- Based on: Marvin's Room by Scott McPherson
- Produced by: Scott Rudin; Jane Rosenthal; Robert De Niro
- Starring: Meryl Streep; Leonardo DiCaprio; Diane Keaton; Robert De Niro; Hume Cronyn; Gwen Verdon; Hal Scardino
- Cinematography: Piotr Sobociński
- Edited by: Jim Clark
- Music by: Rachel Portman
- Production companies: Scott Rudin Productions; Tribeca Productions
- Distributed by: Miramax Films
- Release dates: December 18, 1996 (Limited); February 28, 1997 (United States)
- Running time: 98 minutes
- Country: United States
- Language: English
- Budget: $23 million
- Box office: $30 million

Marvin's Room is a 1996 American drama film directed by Jerry Zaks. The script was written by John Guare and based on the 1990 play of the same name by Scott McPherson, who died in 1992. McPherson had completed a screenplay for a film version before he died; however, Guare was hired to update it when the film eventually started production.

It stars Meryl Streep, Leonardo DiCaprio, Diane Keaton, Robert De Niro, Hume Cronyn, Gwen Verdon and Hal Scardino. Original music for the film was composed by Rachel Portman. Carly Simon wrote and performed the theme song "Two Little Sisters", with Meryl Streep adding background vocals.

Marvin's Room was released by Miramax Films on December 18, 1996. The film was only modestly successful financially, grossing $30 million against a $23 million budget. However, it fared better critically. For her performance, Keaton received nominations for the Academy Award for Best Actress, the Critics' Choice Movie Award for Best Actress and Screen Actors Guild Award for Outstanding Performance by a Female Actor in a Leading Role. Streep was also nominated for the Golden Globe Award for Best Actress in a Motion Picture – Drama.

== Plot ==
Marvin, a man who had a stroke twenty years ago, is incapacitated and bedridden. He has been given care by his sister Ruth and his daughter Bessie in their Florida home, and ignored by his other daughter Lee, who moved to Ohio twenty years ago and has not contacted her family since.

Lee's 17-year-old son Hank, missing his father and angry with his mother, sets fire to some photos and burns down the house. Hank becomes sectioned in a mental institution. Lee visits but explains to the psychiatrist she does not have a good relationship with her son.

Bessie's doctor has informed her she has leukemia (the same disease from which her and Lee's mother died) and needs a bone marrow transplant, so she turns to her sister Lee for help. Lee believes her sons Charlie and Hank may be a match, so she goes to get Hank. He apologizes to her for burning down the house, and they leave for Florida to stay with Bessie.

When they arrive, Hank refuses to get out of the car and the initial meeting with Marvin goes badly. Hank refuses to be tested to see if he is a bone marrow match. He accuses Bessie of wanting to stay away from the family, so Bessie tries to build a relationship with him. She gifts to Hank her father's tools from his bedroom, and he takes her on a drive along the beach. He eventually confides in her about what went on in the institution and agrees to be tested. When Lee learns she may have to take over her father's care, she begins shopping for nursing homes, fearing she will have to uproot her life. Bessie begs Lee to move to Florida permanently, and the boys are tested to see if they are a bone marrow match.

As the days pass, the family begins to grow closer. Lee restyles Bessie's wig and serves dinners for the family. The following day, they all head to Disney World. Lee confides to Hank that his dad would abuse him, and that he was not the perfect father Hank remembers. During the afternoon, in the crowd and with the heat, Bessie begins to feel unwell, which scares the family.

Testing reveals the boys are not a match as bone marrow donors, and Bessie's condition begins to deteriorate. Lee comes to terms with it now being up to her to take care of her family. She familiarizes herself with her father's medications and walks into his room with his lunch to see Bessie flashing sunlight off the mirror that often makes Marvin smile.

== Cast ==
- Meryl Streep as Lee, Hank and Charlie's mother
- Leonardo DiCaprio as Hank, Lee's 17-year-old son
- Diane Keaton as Bessie, Lee's sister
- Robert De Niro as Dr. Wally
- Hume Cronyn as Marvin, father of Lee and Bessie
- Gwen Verdon as Ruth, Marvin's sister
- Hal Scardino as Charlie, Lee's 10-year-old son
- Dan Hedaya as Bob, Wally's brother
- Cynthia Nixon as the Retirement Home Director
- Margo Martindale as Dr. Charlotte
- Joe Lisi as Bruno

== Production ==
=== Pre-production ===
Marvin's Room originated as a stage play by Scott McPherson, which was first developed by the Goodman Theatre and Victory Gardens Theater in Chicago before being produced by Hartford Stage Company. Drawing in part on McPherson's experiences with older relatives who lived in Florida, as well as his experiences caring for his partner, cartoonist and activist Daniel Sotomayor, during the HIV/AIDS epidemic, the play explored the reciprocal nature of caregiving and the ways in which acts of love could transcend suffering. The play subsequently transferred to Off-Broadway, opening at Playwrights Horizons in 1991, where it earned critical acclaim and established McPherson as a prominent young playwright. McPherson also completed a screenplay adaptation of the play before his death from complications related to HIV/AIDS in 1992, at the age of 33.

Despite its critical success on stage, Marvin's Room was initially regarded as an unlikely candidate for a film adaptation because of its intimate, highly theatrical nature. In 1990, Jane Rosenthal saw the play and believed it could be successfully adapted for the screen. Rosenthal became the driving force behind the project, encouraging Tribeca Films partner Robert De Niro to become involved and working for several years with directors, writers, and producers to develop the screenplay and production. De Niro credited Rosenthal and, later, Scott Rudin with much of the work that brought the project into shape, following several ups and downs during development. Rudin, who had been impressed by the stage production himseld, recalled that he initially thought a film adaptation was "a ridiculous idea" after learning that the rights had been acquired. Nevertheless, the project eventually secured financial backing, with Rudin joining the production as a producer.

=== Casting ===
Among the first people sent McPherson's screenplay, was Meryl Streep, who agreed to play Bessie after seeing the play with her son Henry in 1990. At the time, the film rights were held by a woman who also expressed an interest in directing the adaptation, despite having no previous directing experience in film or television; De Niro's Tribeca Films was attached solely as the production company. Anjelica Huston was subsequently cast as Lee. Streep later withdrew from the project, explaining that she had become apprehensive about the material and its delicate balance between tragedy and comedy, which she feared would take too heavy an emotional toll, as well as reservations about the prospective director's lack of experience. As the project faced prolonged pre-production and financing difficulties, Huston also departed after deciding to direct a film of her own.

After De Niro and producer Scott Rudin secured the film rights and began revamping the project, Streep rejoined the production. By then, however, she no longer wanted to play Bessie, having recently portrayed several maternal and sympathetic characters, particularly in Barbet Schroeder's Before and After (1996). Instead, she chose to play Lee and suggested Diane Keaton for the role of Bessie, whom she had not previously worked with and wanted to collaborate with. De Niro subsequently brought in Leonardo DiCaprio to play Hank, having previously worked with him on Michael Caton-Jones's biographical coming-of-age drama This Boy's Life (1993). Although De Niro initially intended to remain behind the scenes to avoid appearing in films produced by his own company, Rosenthal, Rudin, and Harvey Weinstein persuaded him to take a supporting role. Sigourney Weaver down an offer to co-star in the film.

=== Filming ===
Principal photography for Marvin's Room took place largely in Central Florida between August 14 and October 28, 1995, with much of the late-summer filming centered in Rockledge, Florida. The Space Coast Film Commission assisted the production in scouting locations throughout Brevard County. The filmmakers ultimately selected a flat-roofed house on South Fernwood Drive in Rockledge, near the river and surrounded by trees, to serve as the family's home in the film. Other filming locations included the Florida Manor nursing home in Orlando, Orange World in Osceola County, and a soundstage at Disney-MGM Studios. Several days of filming also took place at Walt Disney World in Orlando, including scenes shot at Magic Kingdom's Swiss Family Treehouse and Liberty Square. According to The Orlando Sentinel, the production kept the Disney shoot largely unpublicized and prohibited park guests from taking photographs. Around 200 extras, hired by Ellen Jacoby Casting International in Miami, were used to portray tourists, while Disney cast members helped secure the filming areas.

=== Post-production ===
During development, the filmmakers adjusted the play's broader comedic elements. De Niro noted that the humor was toned down during editing to make the characters and situations more believable, particularly the eccentric doctor played in the film.

== Release and reception ==
The film had a limited U.S. theatrical release on December 18, 1996, followed by a wide U.S. theatrical release on February 28 1997. In Australia, the film was released theatrically during May 1997, while in the United Kingdom, it was released on June 20, 1997. In February 1997, it screened at the Berlin International Film Festival, before receiving a German theatrical release in June 1997. It also screened at the Moscow International Film Festival in July 1997, where it won the Golden St. George award.

It grossed $12.8 million in the United States and Canada, and $30 million worldwide.

=== Critical response ===
Marvin's Room holds an 83% approval rating on review aggregator Rotten Tomatoes, based on 48 reviews, with an average rating of 6.7/10. The website's critical consensus reads: "Marvin's Room rises above the pack of dysfunctional family dramas thanks to an impeccable cast that includes Meryl Streep, Diane Keaton, and Leonardo DiCaprio." Metacritic gave the film a score of 68 out of 100, based on 20 critical reviews, indicating "generally favorable" reviews. Audiences polled by CinemaScore gave the film an average grade of "C+" on a scale of A+ to F.

== Accolades ==
Award	Category	Nominee(s)	Result	Ref.
Academy Awards	Best Actress	Diane Keaton	Nominated	
Blockbuster Entertainment Awards	Favorite Actress – Drama	Meryl Streep	Nominated	
Camerimage Awards	Golden Frog	Piotr Sobocinski	Nominated	
Chlotrudis Awards	Best Movie		Nominated	
Chlotrudis Awards	Best Director	Jerry Zaks	Nominated	
Chlotrudis Awards	Best Supporting Actor	Leonardo DiCaprio	Won	
Chlotrudis Awards	Best Supporting Actress	Meryl Streep	Nominated	
Christopher Awards	Motion Pictures		Won	
Critics' Choice Awards	Best Actress	Diane Keaton	Nominated	
Golden Globe Awards	Best Actress in a Motion Picture – Drama	Meryl Streep	Nominated	
Kyiv International Film Festival	Best Full-Length Fiction Film	Jerry Zaks	Nominated	
Moscow International Film Festival	Golden St. George	Jerry Zaks	Won	
National Board of Review Awards	Special Recognition for Excellence in Filmmaking		Won	
Screen Actors Guild Awards	Outstanding Performance by a Cast in a Motion Picture	Hume Cronyn, Robert De Niro, Leonardo DiCaprio, Dan Hedaya, Diane Keaton, Hal Scardino, Meryl Streep, and Gwen Verdon	Nominated	
Screen Actors Guild Awards	Outstanding Performance by a Female Actor in a Leading Role	Diane Keaton	Nominated	
Screen Actors Guild Awards	Outstanding Performance by a Female Actor in a Supporting Role	Gwen Verdon	Nominated	

== Home media ==
In the United States, Miramax Home Entertainment released the film on VHS on June 10, 1997, followed by a LaserDisc release on June 18, 1997. The film also received a LaserDisc release in Japan on July 31, 1997, and a LaserDisc release in Hong Kong in August 1997. A U.S. DVD release followed on February 9, 1999.

In 2010, Miramax was sold by The Walt Disney Company (their owners since 1993), with the studio taken over by private equity firm Filmyard Holdings that same year. Filmyard sublicensed the home media rights for several Miramax titles to Echo Bridge Entertainment. On January 27, 2013, Echo Bridge released the film on Blu-ray. Marvin's Room was one of the more notable Miramax titles Filmyard licensed to Echo Bridge, with Filmyard licensing most of Miramax's high-profile titles to Lionsgate Home Entertainment.

Filmyard Holdings sold Miramax to Qatari company beIN Media Group during March 2016. In April 2020, ViacomCBS (now known as Paramount Skydance) acquired the rights to Miramax's library after buying a 49% stake in the studio from beIN. Marvin's Room is among the 700 titles Paramount acquired in the deal.

Paramount Home Entertainment reissued the film on Blu-ray on July 27, 2021, as one of many Miramax titles they reissued around this time. Paramount also made it available on their subscription streaming service Paramount+, as well as on their free streaming service Pluto TV.
