= The Indian in the Cupboard (film) =

1995 film by Frank Oz

- Theatrical release poster
- Directed by: Frank Oz
- Screenplay by: Melissa Mathison
- Based on: The Indian in the Cupboard by Lynne Reid Banks
- Produced by: Kathleen Kennedy; Frank Marshall; Jane Startz
- Starring: Hal Scardino; Litefoot; Lindsay Crouse; Richard Jenkins; Rishi Bhat; David Keith
- Cinematography: Russell Carpenter
- Edited by: Ian Crafford
- Music by: Randy Edelman
- Production companies: Paramount Pictures; Columbia Pictures; The Kennedy/Marshall Company; Scholastic Productions
- Distributed by: Paramount Pictures (Note: Split distribution between Paramount Pictures and Columbia Pictures. Paramount handles the North American theatrical and pay television and international free television and home media release through CIC Video, while Columbia handles the international pay television and theatrical through Columbia TriStar Film Distributors International and North American free television and home media release through Columbia TriStar Home Video.)
- Release date: July 14, 1995
- Running time: 96 minutes
- Country: United States
- Language: English
- Budget: $45 million
- Box office: $35.7 million

The Indian in the Cupboard is a 1995 American family fantasy drama film directed by Frank Oz and written by Melissa Mathison, based on the 1980 children's book by Lynne Reid Banks. The story revolves around a boy who receives a cupboard as a gift on his ninth birthday. He later discovers that putting toy figures in the cupboard, after locking and unlocking it, brings the toys to life. The film stars Hal Scardino as Omri, Litefoot in his film debut as Little Bear, Lindsay Crouse as Omri's mother, Richard Jenkins as Omri's father, Rishi Bhat in his only film as Omri's friend Patrick and David Keith as Boone the Cowboy.

Although it received positive reviews from critics, the film was a box office bomb, earning only $35.7 million against a $45 million budget. It achieved success on home video, earning it a cult following.

== Plot ==
On his ninth birthday, New York City boy Omri receives an old cupboard from his 14-year-old brother Gillon and a toy Native American from his best friend Patrick. Omri gets a special key from his mom, which she got from her grandmother, and locks the toy in the cupboard. The next morning, he hears a small tapping noise coming from the cupboard, and finds that the toy has magically come to life. Frightened by Omri's size, the tiny man pulls out a dagger and points it at Omri. Omri closes and locks the cupboard and decides to keep it a secret.

The next day, the living toy eventually reveals himself as an English-speaking, 18th-century Iroquois (specifically Onondaga) man named Little Bear who was fighting in the French and Indian War on the side of the British. During Little Bear's stay with Omri, Omri learns a lot about the Iroquois, and the two develop a friendship. Omri also learns that Little Bear is a widower.

When Omri brings to life another Native American figure (resembling a Mohawk chieftain), saying Little Bear can have the chieftain's longbow, the chieftain suffers a heart attack out of fear after looking at Omri. Omri's shocked reaction causes Little Bear to realize that Omri really is a child, and not a spirit.

Eventually, Omri reveals his secret to Patrick, who immediately wants to bring to life a toy of his own, which becomes a cowboy from 1879 called "Boohoo" Boone. Boone and Little Bear are initially hostile toward one another, but are forced to behave themselves when Omri and Patrick bring them to school.

That night, Omri and Patrick, along with Little Bear and Boone, watch a program on TV, the movie The Last of His Tribe that shows a relentless slaughter of Yana people by cowboys. Boone is enthusiastic at the sight of his "boys" killing the helpless Native Americans, while Little Bear watches in horror at the sight. Upon hearing Boone fire his gun into the air with delight, Little Bear becomes confused and shoots an arrow into Boone's chest.

The key to the cupboard is lost, and Little Bear goes under the floor to retrieve it, nearly getting killed by an escaped pet rat in the process. With the key back, Omri brings a World War I medic toy to life to treat Boone's wounds. Omri realizes it is time to return Little Bear and Boone to their respective time periods. Later that night, as Patrick sleeps, Omri goes to bring a female Native American toy to life, but Little Bear realizes what Omri is doing and stops him. Omri says he does not want Little Bear to be alone in his own time, but Little Bear dissuades him from going through with it, reasoning that the woman may have a family of her own.

The next morning, Omri and Patrick say their goodbyes to the two tiny men before locking them back in the cupboard and sending them home. Just before saying goodbye, Omri has a vision of a life-sized Little Bear accepting him as his nephew. At school, Omri ends his report concluding that he is glad to have sent Little Bear back to his own people, and that he may start his own family.

== Cast ==
- Hal Scardino as Omri
- Litefoot as Little Bear
- David Keith as Boohoo Boone
- Lindsay Crouse as Jane
- Richard Jenkins as Victor
- Rishi Bhat as Patrick
- Steve Coogan as Tommy Atkins
- Sakina Jaffrey as Lucy
- Vincent Kartheiser as Gillon
- Nestor Serrano as Teacher
- Michael Papajohn as a Cardassian
- Frank Welker as Special Vocal Effects

== Production ==
Litefoot was discovered after performing a rap concert in Rome organized by the American Indian College Fund, who recommended him to the producers. When he joined the film, Litefoot convinced the filmmakers to hire an Onondaga adviser, Jeanne Shenandoah, instead of the Mohawk adviser they had, and the adviser helped make his character Little Bear culturally authentic: "From the bottom of my feet to the top of my bald head, all the tattooing, the dropped earlobes, the leggings, the moccasins, were all Onondaga in 1761." On each day of shooting, it took 3 1/2 to 4 1/2 hours to apply his tattoos with permanent markers.

The filming was marred by the death of technician Pat Tanner, who fell while riding a motorized hoist used to lift scenery on the sound stage at Sony Pictures in Culver City. Tanner's death led to a change in motion picture safety rules on IATSE union film sets to prevent similar accidents.

According to Frank Oz, Bill Murray reportedly auditioned for an unspecified role in the film.

== Reception ==
=== Critical response ===
On Rotten Tomatoes, The Indian in the Cupboard holds a score of 70% based on reviews from 24 critics, with an average rating of 6.4/10. The site's consensus states: "The Indian in the Cupboard gussies up its classic source material in modern effects without losing sight of the timeless themes at the heart of the story." On Metacritic, the film has a weighted average score of 58 out of 100, based on 25 critics, indicating "mixed or average reviews". Audiences polled by CinemaScore gave the film an average grade of "A−" on an A+ to F scale.

Kenneth Turan of the Los Angeles Times applauded the film for its themes of trust and cooperation, writing that it "is intent on teaching lessons [...] with a welcome lack of pretension." In a review for The New York Times, Janet Maslin praised Scardino's acting, but felt that the impact of his role was lessened by the film's use of close-ups. She also criticized the minor status of the character of Omri's mother: "Really wasted here is Lindsay Crouse, who [...] never says much more than 'Boys, time for bed.'" Roger Ebert of the Chicago Sun-Times reviewed the film negatively, describing it as "not exhilarating or exciting or funny in the ways that E.T. was," and predicted that children would find the story "depressing." Rafael Munsi of Common Sense Media gave the film five stars, with the summary "Classic, heartwarming fantasy will rivet kids." Brian Lowry of Variety Magazine said it is "one of the most over-scored movies in recent memory, with Randy Edelman's soundtrack swelling to huge crescendos in even the smallest moments." He also said that the visual effects "cleverly capture the little-guy-in-big-room scenario, though the standard apparently hasn't advanced much since The Incredible Shrinking Man.'" He concluded that it is "yet another example that Hollywood can make movies in which critics of sex and violence can find nothing to complain about. It's also a reminder that 'family values' can be, well, kind of boring." Bob McCabe of Empire gave this film two stars out of five, saying that the film "benefits greatly from the casting of the young Scardino who brings a distinct freshness to the role with his unconventional looks that diverts a good deal of the film's saccharine potential." He also said that the special effects were the movie's strong point." Marc Savlov of the Austin Chronicle rated the film three stars out of five, saying that the special effects "bring the character to life wonderfully, though much of the credit here goes to the remarkably well-chosen cast from Litefoot (in his acting debut) on down." Overall, he said the film is "surprisingly well-done nearly all the way around, [and] neither plays down to its target audience, nor fumbles the inherent childhood fantasy of the story."

In 2015, DVD Talk's William Harrison, reviewing the film for 20th anniversary Blu-ray release, called it "clunky and repetitive" and that it "hits a few dramatic high notes, but lacks an adventurous spark to make it truly memorable."

=== Box office ===
The movie debuted at number six at the North American box office. The film made only $35 million against a production budget of $45 million. It would later become a success on home media releases

== Video game ==
A video game tie-in was released by Viacom New Media in 1995 for MS-DOS, Microsoft Windows and Macintosh. The game got a near positive reception from critics.

== See also ==
- List of films featuring miniature people
