= Hal Scardino =

American actor and producer (born 1984)

- Born: December 25, 1984 (age 41); Savannah, Georgia, U.S.
- Education: Columbia University
- Occupations: Actor, producer
- Years active: 1993–1996 (as actor); 2015–present (as producer)
- Parent(s): Albert Scardino (father); Marjorie Scardino (mother)

Albert Henry Hugh "Hal" Scardino (born December 25, 1984) is an American-British producer and former child actor best known for appearing in the 1995 film The Indian in the Cupboard. He also starred in Searching for Bobby Fischer, Marvin's Room, and The Show.

Scardino appeared in the play Saltonstall's Trial by Michael Cormier in October 2019 in Beverly, MA.

== Biography ==
Born in the United States of America in Savannah, Georgia, Scardino grew up in the London district of Knightsbridge. He is the youngest of three children born to Marjorie Morris Scardino, chief executive officer of media group Pearson, and Albert Scardino, a Pulitzer Prize-winning journalist. His current living relatives include Juliet Eliana Scardino and Brian Paul Scardino.

He was educated at Winchester College, an independent school for boys in England. He graduated in 2008 from Columbia University, where he competed on the Columbia Lions fencing team.

== Filmography ==
- Searching for Bobby Fischer (1993) as Morgan Pehme
- The Indian in the Cupboard (1995) as Omri
- Marvin's Room (1996) as Charlie
- The Show (2015) as Ethan (also producer)
