= Litefoot =

American actor and musician

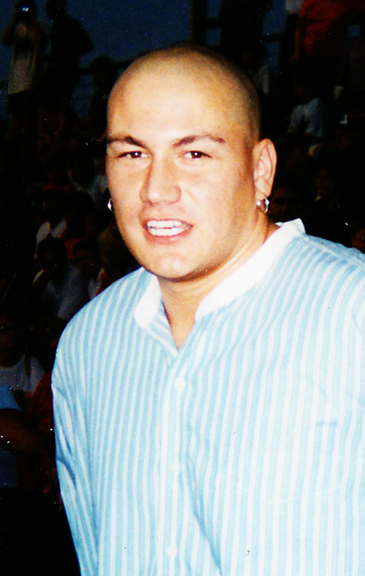
- Litefoot in Tahlequah (1995)

Background information
- Born: Gary Paul Davis; September 11, 1968 (age 58); Upland, California, U.S.
- Origin: Tulsa, Oklahoma, U.S.
- Genre: Hip hop
- Occupations: Rapper; actor; singer; songwriter; businessman
- Years active: 1989–present
- Label: Red Vinyl
- Website: www.litefoot.com

Gary Paul Davis (born September 11, 1968), better known professionally as Litefoot, is a Native American (Cherokee Nation) rapper, actor, and businessman. He is the executive director of the Native American Financial Services Association (NAFSA), CEO of Davis Strategy Group and a member of the Forbes Finance Council. As an actor, he is known for his roles as Little Bear in the movie The Indian in the Cupboard, and Nightwolf in Mortal Kombat Annihilation.

== Early and personal life ==
Litefoot was born in Upland, California, was raised in Tulsa, Oklahoma, and has lived in Seattle, Washington since 1997. He is of Cherokee descent on his father's side and of Chichimeca (northern Mexican Indigenous) descent on his mother's side. He is married to Carmen Davis, who serves as president of the Reach The Rez effort and is of the Makah, Yakama, and Chippewa Cree tribes. They have three sons, Quannah, Sequoyah, and Qwnuseia.

== Career ==
=== Business ===
Before being appointed as executive director of NAFSA, Davis served as president and CEO of the National Center for American Indian Enterprise Development (NCAIED) and as a member of the NCAIED’s Board of Directors. He has served as vice-president of native affairs for the Triple Five Group, owners of the world’s largest retail shopping malls; the Mall of America and the West Edmonton Mall and he previously served as co-chair of the National Indian Gaming Association’s, American Indian Business Network.

Davis owns and operates the Davis Strategy Group and has facilitated an array of cross sector business opportunities in Indian Country ranging from energy, acquisitions, casino gaming, hospitality, land development, health and pharmaceutical initiatives. He also owns the Native Style Clothing brand and Red Vinyl Records.

=== Entertainment ===
Davis is a successful musician and feature film and television actor with eight award winning albums and starring roles in such films as The Indian in The Cupboard (in which he played the title character) and television programs such as House of Cards. Although Litefoot is not the first Native American performer of hip hop music, he is among the first Native American hip hop artists to be an enrolled member of a federally recognized tribe. He has won six Native American Music Awards, his most recent for Artist of The Year.

Since 2005, he has hosted and produced his own nationally-distributed hip hop and R&B radio show called Reach the Rez Radio, which broadcasts weekly through Native Voice One Satellite Network. Litefoot produces several clothing lines the best known being the "Native Style" brand. He annually spends months of his time working on various reservations across the United States and Canada. His most recent music and speaking tour was the "Reach the Rez Tour". This annual project lasted one year, 54,000 miles and 211 events across the United States.

=== Philanthropy ===
Davis has traveled throughout the United States delivering messages of hope and empowerment to over 450 American Indian communities. As the spokesperson of the "Reach The Rez Project", Davis has raised nearly $1.5 million to ensure the success of the effort.

=== Public speaking ===
Davis regularly delivers motivational speeches to tribal, educational and corporate audiences as a public speaker. He has provided keynotes and business trainings for corporations and tribes and lectured at a variety of colleges and universities across North America.

== Awards and recognition ==
Davis is a recipient of the prestigious Sevenstar Award from the Cherokee Nation Historical Society, presented to a Cherokee who is accomplished in a chosen field, brought honor to the Cherokee people and serves as an inspiration to others. He has also received the Department of Commerce Minority Business Development Agency National Director Special Recognition Award was appointed as an Ambassador of the Department of Energy’s Minorities in Energy initiative and was also appointed to the United States Small Business Administration’s Council on Underserved Communities. Mr. Davis was recognized as one of the "Fifty Faces of Indian Country" by Indian Country Today Media Network.

== Discography ==
- 1992 - The Money EP
- 1994 - Seein' Red
- 1996 - Good Day To Die
- 1998 - The Clown Kutz
- 1998 - The Life & Times
- 1998 - Red Ryders Vol. 1
- 1999 - Red Ryders Vol. 2
- 1999 - Rez Affiliated
- 1999 - The Lite Years 1989–1999 - The Best of Mr. Foot
- 2001 - Tribal Boogie
- 2002 - The Messenger
- 2003 - Native American Me
- 2004 - Redvolution
- 2008 - Relentless Pursuit

== Filmography ==
- 1995 - The Indian in the Cupboard - Little Bear
- 1995 - Showbiz Today - episode - July 13-1995 - Himself
- 1997 - The Song of Hiawatha
- 1997 - Mortal Kombat Annihilation - Nightwolf
- 1997 - Kull the Conqueror - Ascalante
- 1998 - Angel on Fire
- 2001 - The Pearl - Juan Tomas
- 2001 - Any Day Now episode "No More Forever" - July 22-2001 - Charley Majors
- 2002 - Adaptation - Russell
- 2022–2024 - Spirit Rangers - Qamash, Stone Cold, Catfish Spirit, Construction Worker, Stinky, Mark, Huck
