= American Primitive =

Play written by William Gibson

- Written by: William Gibson
- Subject: John and Abigail Adams; American Revolution
- Genre: Verse drama

Premiere
- Date: 1969
- Place: Berkshire Theatre Festival
- Directed by: Frank Langella

American Primitive is a play by William Gibson about the lives of John and Abigail Adams. Gibson used the correspondence of John and Abigail Adams to create a verse drama about the period of the American Revolution.

American Primitive debuted, unsuccessfully, at the Berkshire Theatre Festival in 1969. The production, directed by Frank Langella, starred Anne Bancroft as Abigail Adams.
