= Samuel Pearson =

Founder of Pearson plc

- Born: 1814; England, UK
- Died: 1884 (aged 69–70); Scholes, West Yorkshire, England
- Known for: Owner of Pearson plc
- Relatives: Weetman Pearson (grandson)

Samuel Pearson (1814–1884) was an English entrepreneur and founder of Pearson plc, a leading education (originally construction) company listed on the London Stock Exchange.

== Career ==
After working as a labourer, Pearson set up his own brickmaking and contracting business in Bradford in 1844. In 1856, he brought his son, George, into the business and in 1857 the business won an important contract for extension and refurbishment work on the Lancashire and Yorkshire Railway. By 1861 it was employing 9 men and a farmer. He retired in 1879 and died in Scholes in 1884.

== Sources ==
- Garner, Paul (2011). British Lions and Mexican Eagles: Business, Politics and Empire in the Career of Weetman Pearson in Mexico, 1889-1919. Stanford University Press. ISBN 978-0804774451.
