= Marvin's Room (play) =

Play written by Scott McPherson

- Original language: English
- Written by: Scott McPherson
- Subject: Family, cancer, death, sisters, humor
- Setting: 1990s Florida, USA

Premiere
- Date: 1990
- Place: Goodman Theatre, Chicago

Marvin's Room is a play by the American writer Scott McPherson. It tells the story of Bessie and her estranged sister, Lee, who confront a family crisis.

== Background ==
The play is based upon McPherson's experiences with older relatives who lived in Florida. McPherson cared for his partner, the cartoonist and activist Daniel Sotomayor, who died from AIDS. His experiences living in the darkest days of the AIDS epidemic influenced his writing. McPherson himself died in 1992 of AIDS at age 33.

== Synopsis ==
Bessie, a strong-willed woman, takes care of her bedridden father and eccentric Aunt Ruth. After Bessie is diagnosed with leukemia, her estranged sister, Lee, comes to visit and to be tested as a possible bone marrow donor for her sister. The reunion between the sisters is initially uncomfortable, aggravated by the difficult behavior of Lee's two sons. The two women eventually confront their shortcomings as sisters, reach out to each other, and arrive at an understanding about the importance of family.

== Casts of major productions ==
Character	1990 Goodman Theatre cast	1990 Hartford Stage cast	1991-92 Off-Broadway cast	1992 West End cast	1994 Los Angeles cast	2017 Broadway cast
Bessie Wakefield	Laura Esterman	Laura Esterman	Laura Esterman	Alison Steadman	Mary Steenburgen	Lili Taylor
Lee Wakefield Lacker	Lee Guthrie	Janet Zarish	Lisa Emery	Phyllis Logan	Jean Smart	Janeane Garofalo
Hank	Mark Rosenthal	Mark Rosenthal	Mark Rosenthal	Aiden Gillen	-	Jack DiFalco
Aunt Ruth	Jane MacIver	Mary Louise Burke	Alice Drummond	Carmel McSharry	Jane Cecil	Celia Weston

== Productions ==
Marvin's Room premiered at the Goodman Theatre Studio in Chicago in 1990, directed by David Petrarca.

It played at The Hartford Stage, opening November 1990.

It ran Off-Broadway at Playwrights Horizons, opening on November 15, 1991, and closing on February 23, 1992. The play re-opened Off-Broadway at the Minetta Lane Theater in March 1992 and closed on September 6, 1992, directed by David Petraca.

It played at the Kennedy Center for the Performing Arts in Washington, DC, from September 1992 to October 1992, directed by David Petrarca.

It was performed at the Hampstead Theatre in London in 1993 and transferred to the West End at the Comedy Theatre for a short-run.

It played in Los Angeles at the Tiffany Theater in 1994.

A Broadway production ran at the Roundabout Theatre Company at the American Airlines Theatre from June 8 to August 27, 2017. It was directed by Anne Kauffman. The cast included Janeane Garofalo, Lili Taylor, Jack DiFalco, and Celia Weston.

== Film adaptation ==
The play was adapted as a film also called Marvin's Room by John Guare in 1996. Diane Keaton was nominated for the Academy Award for Best Actress for her performance as Bessie.

== Awards and nominations ==
- 1991-1992 Obie Award for Distinguished Performance by an Actress - Laura Esterman (winner)
- 1992 Drama Desk Award for Outstanding Play - (winner)
- 1992 Drama Desk Award for Outstanding Actress in a Play - Laura Esterman (winner)
- 1992 Drama Critics' Circle Award Runner-Up, Best American Play (nomination)
