= The Northern Echo =

Newspaper in England

- A Northern Echo front page from 2007
- Type: Daily newspaper
- Format: Broadsheet (1870–2007); Compact (2007–present)
- Owner: USA Today Co.
- Founder(s): John Hyslop Bell and the Pease family
- Publisher: Newsquest
- Editor: Gavin Foster
- Founded: 1870
- Political alignment: Independent
- Language: English
- Headquarters: Darlington, County Durham
- Circulation: 7,528 (as of 2024)
- Sister newspapers: Darlington & Stockton Times; The Advertiser
- ISSN: 2043-0442
- Website: thenorthernecho.co.uk

The Northern Echo is a regional daily morning newspaper based in the town of Darlington in North East England, serving mainly southern County Durham and northern Yorkshire. The paper covers national as well as regional news. In 2007, its then-editor claimed that it was one of the most famous provincial newspapers in the United Kingdom. Its first edition was published on 1 January 1870.

Its second editor was W. T. Stead, the early pioneer of British investigative journalism, who earned the paper accolades from the leading Liberals of the day, seeing it applauded as "the best paper in Europe." Harold Evans, one of the great campaigning journalists of all time, was editor of The Northern Echo in the 1960s and argued the case for cervical smear tests for women. Evans agreed with Stead that reporting was "a very good way of attacking the devil".

== History ==
The Northern Echo was started by John Hyslop Bell with the backing of the Pease family, largely to counter the conservative outpourings of rival newspapers, the Darlington & Stockton Times and the Darlington Mercury. The paper enjoyed early success under its second editor, W. T. Stead, an early pioneer of investigative journalism, who brought the paper international notoriety during the Bulgarian Atrocities agitation in 1876. Leading Liberals such as Gladstone and Joseph Chamberlain became great admirers, and the historian E. A. Freeman went so far as to declare the Northern Echo, as "the best paper in Europe."

However, the loss of Stead to the Pall Mall Gazette in 1880 and the resignation of founder Bell in 1889 took a heavy toll on the Echo and its sales slumped to a critical low for decades after. The collapse of the Pease dynasty and increased competition from rival newspapers added to the Echo's troubles and, by the time it limped into the twentieth century, led by John Marshall, it was on the verge of bankruptcy. The Echo employed the editor's daughter Emilie Marshall, and she would become a leading journalist after her father was sacked.

The paper was saved from ruin in 1903, when it was acquired by the North of England Newspaper Company, a group owned by chocolatiers Rowntree. An acquisition by Westminster Press, a subsidiary of S. Pearson and Sons, in 1921 secured the Echo's future.

In 1936 Edward Pickering begun his apprenticeship at the Echo, eventually rising to the position of district reporter and sub-editor, before leaving to sub-edit the Daily Mirror. He eventually became editor of the Daily Express before rising to the position of executive vice-chairman at News International.

For five years Harold Evans (former deputy editor of the Manchester Evening News) was editor of the paper, which was a time he "loved". One of his campaigns resulted in a national programme for the detection of cervical cancer. He also campaigned against air pollution on Teesside and for the floodlighting of Durham Cathedral. When Evans left the Echo in 1967, he moved to London as editor of The Sunday Times. Evans has said of his time at the Echo:

It has 99,000 circulation when I went there; when I left it had 114,000. It spread over a very large area; two English counties and a couple of cities. It was a morning paper competing against nine national dailies produced in London and Manchester, three regional morning [papers] and two or three evening [papers], so [it had] intense competition in the North East of England, where most of the readers were coal miners and industrial workers, but in the south a belt of farmers and gentry, so it was a fascinating social market to reach. I took from my American experience a zest for investigative journalism, and campaigned about air pollution and many other things, the most interesting one in a way was that I campaigned for an inquiry into a man who had been hanged for a murder he didn't do, the famous John Christie case ... After a year of campaigning from the North East of England I got a national inquiry into the Evans hanging.

== Recent events ==
Today, The Northern Echo is owned by Newsquest (Yorkshire and North East) Ltd. According to the Audit Bureau of Circulations during the second half of 2010, The Northern Echo sold on average approximately 42,000 copies daily. It has four editions covering Darlington, county Durham, North Yorkshire and Teesside. In June 2008, the newspaper announced it would reduce the number of editions to two.

Although traditionally a broadsheet, since 26 February 2007 the newspaper has been published in a compact (tabloid) format. The newspaper transformed itself from a broadsheet to a compact in a one-year transition process, beginning with Saturday editions on 14 January 2006.

The Northern Echo has a number of sister publications, including the weekly Darlington & Stockton Times and the free Advertiser series.

In recent years, the web edition has used a paywall - allowing a limited number of articles to be viewed free.

== Editors ==
- John Copleston: editor 1870–71
- William Thomas Stead: editor 1871–80
- John Marshall (lived c. 1856–c. 1903)
- Reggie Gray
- Mark Barrington-Ward: editor 1960–61
- Sir Harold Evans: editor 1963–67
- Don Evans
- Allan Prosser 1982–89
- Peter Sands 1989–93
- David Flintham (now David Kernek) 1993–96
- Andrew Smith 1997–99
- Peter Barron 1999–2016
- Andy Richardson 2016–2018
- Hannah Chapman 2018–2020
- Karl Holbrook 2020–2022
- Gavin Foster 2022-

== Former journalists ==
- Mike Amos, long-serving writer for the paper, author of countless columns, including Gadfly
