= Pearson plc =

British education and assessment company

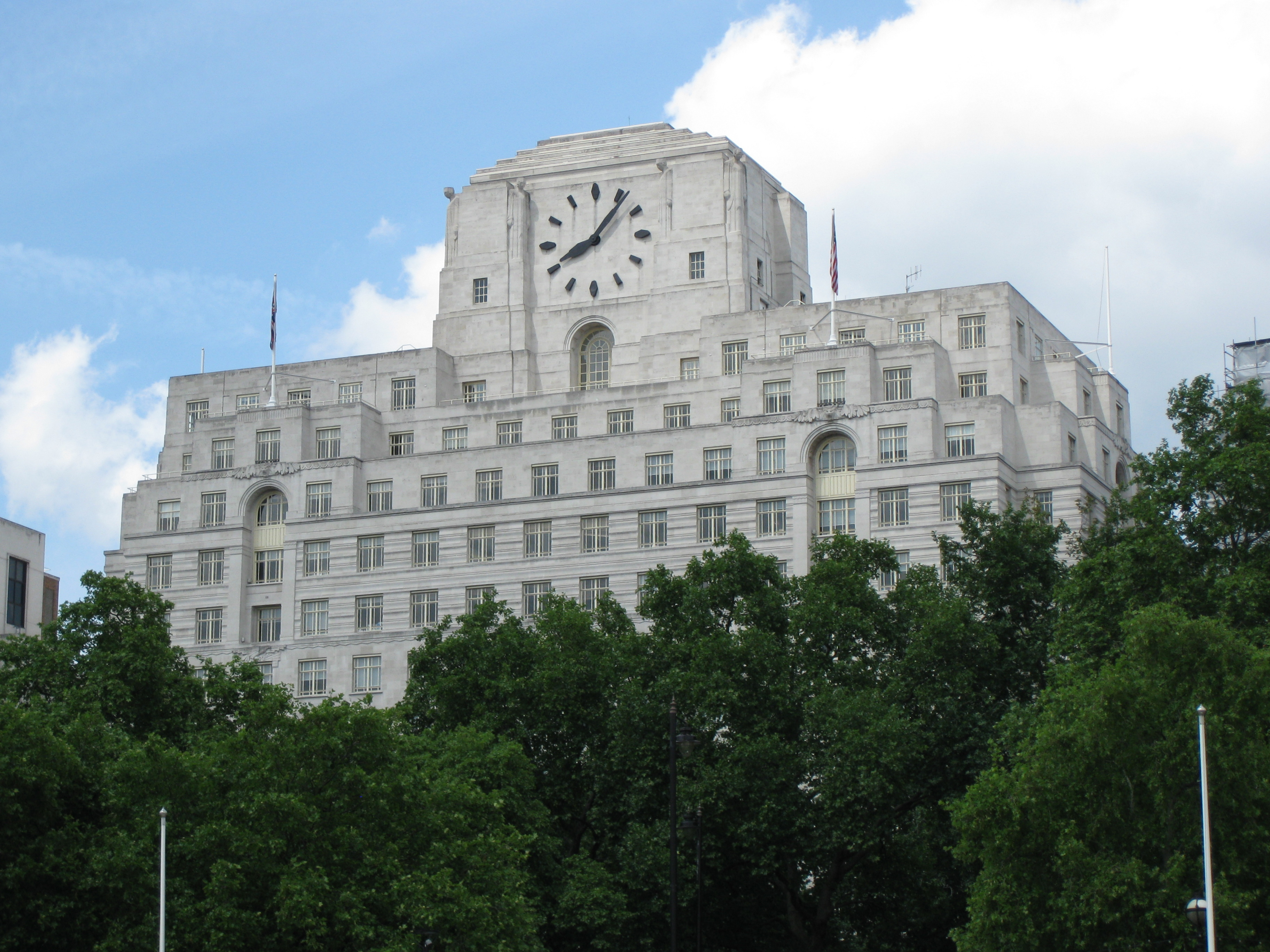
- Eighty Strand, Pearson's headquarters in London
- Formerly: S. Pearson & Son plc
- Type: Public
- Traded as: LSE: PSON; NYSE: PSO; FTSE 100 component
- ISIN: GB0006776081
- Industry: Education
- Founded: 1844; 182 years ago
- Founder: Samuel Pearson
- Headquarters: Shell Mex House, London, England
- Key people: Omid Kordestani (chairman); Omar Abbosh (CEO)
- Products: Educational materials, assessments, qualifications, digital learning products
- Services: Educational assessment; virtual learning; English-language learning; higher education; enterprise learning and skills
- Revenue: ▲£3,577 million (2025) (2025)
- Operating income: ▼£507 million (2025) (2025)
- Net income: ▼£336 million (2025) (2025)
- Total assets: ▼£6,458 million (2025) (2025)
- Total equity: ▼£3,663 million (2025) (2025)
- Number of employees: 17,062 average (2025)
- Subsidiaries: Pearson Education; Edexcel
- Website: plc.pearson.com

Pearson is a British multinational education and assessment company headquartered in London. It provides learning materials, assessments, qualifications, virtual learning, English-language learning, higher-education products and enterprise learning and skills services. The company is listed on the London Stock Exchange, is a constituent of the FTSE 100 Index, and has a secondary listing on the New York Stock Exchange through American depositary receipts. In 2025, Pearson reported revenue of £3.6 billion and had an average of about 17,000 employees.

The company originated as S. Pearson & Son, a Yorkshire building and civil-engineering contractor founded in the nineteenth century. Under Weetman Pearson, 1st Viscount Cowdray, it became one of the world's largest engineering contractors and developed interests in Mexican oil, electricity, finance, coal, aviation and publishing. In the twentieth century Pearson shifted towards publishing and media, acquiring the Financial Times and a stake in The Economist in 1957, Longman in 1968 and Penguin Books in 1970. The company changed its name from S. Pearson & Son plc to Pearson plc in 1984.

Under chief executive Marjorie Scardino, Pearson increasingly focused on education, forming Pearson Education in 1998 after acquiring the education businesses of Simon & Schuster. Between 2015 and 2020 Pearson sold the Financial Times, its stake in The Economist, and its remaining stake in Penguin Random House, leaving education, assessment and learning technology as its core businesses.

Pearson is organised around five business units: Assessment & Qualifications, Virtual Learning, English Language Learning, Higher Education, and Enterprise Learning and Skills. It owns Edexcel, one of the main GCSE and A-level examination boards in England. Omar Abbosh has been chief executive since January 2024. Pearson has faced criticism and regulatory action over its role in education policy, exam security, qualification standards, data-breach disclosure and executive pay.

== History ==
=== Civil engineering businesses 1844–1925 ===
In 1844 Samuel Pearson became an associate partner in a small brickmaking and contracting civil engineering company in Huddersfield, West Yorkshire. In 1856 Pearson's eldest son George entered the business, which became known as S. Pearson & Son, described as "sanitary tube and brickmakers and contractors for local public works in and around Bradford". In 1880 control passed to Samuel's grandson Weetman Dickinson Pearson, who moved the headquarters to London in 1884 and expanded the business into one of the world's largest civil-engineering contractors.

Under Weetman Pearson the firm developed a reputation for difficult infrastructure works, especially tunnels, docks, harbours, drainage schemes and other wet-ground engineering. Its projects included the Blackwall Tunnel in London, the Admiralty Harbour at Dover, the Halifax Dry Dock in Canada, the East River Tunnels in New York City, the Gran Canal del Desagüe in Mexico, the Tehuantepec Railway, and railways and harbours around the world.

Another prominent Pearson engineer was Ernest William Moir, who after working on tunnels in New York City became the contractor's agent for construction of the Blackwall Tunnel under the River Thames between 1892 and 1897.

In November 1915, during the First World War, the firm began construction of HM Factory, Gretna, the largest cordite factory in the United Kingdom. The construction business was wound down during the 1920s. Its final major projects included construction of the Silent Valley Reservoir in Northern Ireland, awarded in 1923, and completion of the Sennar Dam in Sudan in 1925.

=== Manufacturing businesses 1856–1993 ===
In 1856, S. Pearson & Son advertised itself as manufacturing sanitary tubes and bricks in Yorkshire. Manufacturing later expanded beyond sanitary tubes and bricks to include nuts and bolts, specialist glass, pottery, porcelain, fine china and related products.

After the Second World War the Pearson group built a substantial ceramics interest. In 1951 Whitehall Securities purchased the Lawley Group, a china and glassware retailer and pottery owner, while the Pearson group already owned Booths and Colcloughs and other ceramic businesses. Pearson acquired Allied English Potteries, including Royal Crown Derby, in 1964, and bought Doulton & Co. in November 1971, merging the ceramics interests.

Pearson purchased the Fairey Group in 1980, and its engineering operations were merged with Doulton's industrial ceramics engineering. Pearson sold Doulton Glass Industries Ltd in 1982. The Fairey Group became independent of Pearson in 1986 through a management buy-out. As Pearson concentrated on publishing and media, it divested Royal Doulton, its remaining fine china division and last major manufacturing asset, in 1993.

=== Electricity businesses 1900–1960 ===
The conglomerate entered the electrification market in 1900, when Weetman Pearson was asked to electrify Mexico's tramway system and then the general electrical supply in the city of Vera Cruz and elsewhere. The group later repeated this model in Chile. These electrical interests were consolidated into Whitehall Electric Investments Ltd in 1922.

In 1929 the electricity businesses in Mexico and Chile were sold, while similar electricity utilities were developed in south-west England until they were nationalised in 1948. Pearson's remaining overseas electricity utility businesses, which had spread to Greece, were closed by 1960.

=== Oil businesses 1901–1989 ===
While building the Tehuantepec National Railway in Mexico for President Porfirio Díaz, Weetman Pearson learned of oil deposits in Mexico and south Texas and in 1901 began buying prospective oil lands. Pearson founded the Mexican Eagle Petroleum Company in 1909 to hold the group's Mexican oil interests.

In 1919 the Royal Dutch Shell Group acquired a large share of, and managerial control over, Mexican Eagle. Pearson then formed Whitehall Petroleum Corporation Ltd to take over residual Pearson oil interests and prospect globally for oil. The same year it established the Amerada Corporation in the United States. Amerada was compulsorily acquired by the British government in 1941 during the Second World War; Pearson reacquired a small interest in 1945.

In the 1950s Pearson expanded its North American oil and gas interests, and in the 1970s expanded exploration activities more widely. In 1989, as part of its focus on publishing and media, Pearson divested its oil and gas exploration activities and sold Whitehall Petroleum.

=== Holding companies, banking and financial services 1907–1999 ===
Whitehall Securities was created in 1907 as a holding company for Pearson's non-contracting industries. The growth of Mexican oil and overseas infrastructure encouraged the Pearson group to separate construction, finance and investment activities within a broader holding-company structure. In 1919 Pearson founded Whitehall Trust Ltd as a finance and issuing house.

After Weetman Pearson's death in 1927, his son Bernard Clive Pearson chaired S. Pearson & Son from 1927 to 1954. When Clive Pearson retired, his nephew Weetman John Churchill Pearson, 3rd Viscount Cowdray became chairman. The Science Museum Group describes the company at that point as still family-owned and in a difficult position after the nationalisation of its main aviation activities, coal mines and electric utilities; it retained a controlling interest in Lazard Brothers, Westminster Press and other financial and industrial investments.

In 1919 Pearson also acquired a 45% stake in the London branch of merchant bankers Lazard Brothers. During the depression years Pearson's holding increased to about 80% after the 1931 rescue of Lazard Brothers, whose London house had been weakened by large concealed foreign-exchange losses at its Brussels office.

In 1976 Pearson acquired a stake in Embankment Trust Ltd. By 1990 Pearson's stake in Lazard Brothers had been reduced to 50% following Lazard's internationalisation to Paris and New York, and Pearson acquired 10% stakes in the two overseas branches. In 1999, as Pearson refocused on education, publishing and media, it sold its Lazard holdings for £410 million.

=== Coal businesses 1921–1947 ===
Beginning in 1921 Pearson partnered with Dorman Long to form a coal-mining business, incorporated in 1922 as Pearson & Dorman Long Ltd. The company developed and operated collieries, including in the Kent coalfield, and was affected by the post-war nationalisation of the coal industry.

=== Publishing businesses 1921–1997 ===
In 1921 Pearson purchased a number of local daily and weekly newspapers in the United Kingdom and combined them to form the Westminster Press group.

In the post-war newspaper business, Angela Murray (née Pearson) became a director of the Pearson group and chair of Westminster Press in 1953, whose local newspapers included the Oxford Mail, The Northern Echo and the Brighton Evening News.

Under Weetman John Churchill Pearson, 3rd Viscount Cowdray, who chaired the company from 1954 to 1977, Pearson shifted further towards publishing and media. The group bought the Financial Times and acquired a 50% stake in The Economist in 1957, purchased Longman in 1968, became a public company in 1969, and acquired Penguin Books in 1970 and Ladybird Books in 1972.

Patrick Gibson, Baron Gibson, who married into the Pearson family, joined Westminster Press in 1947 and became a director in 1948. He later chaired Pearson Longman from 1967 to 1979, chaired Financial Times Ltd from 1975 to 1977, and was group chairman of Pearson plc from 1978 to 1983.

Michael Hare, 2nd Viscount Blakenham, a grandson of Weetman Harold Miller Pearson, 2nd Viscount Cowdray, and a great-grandson of Weetman Pearson, 1st Viscount Cowdray, became chairman in 1983. Contemporary reporting described Pearson under Blakenham as narrowing a formerly sprawling conglomerate towards chosen core areas, with disposals including Château Latour, building products, sanitary ware, film production, glass and engineering.

In 1984 the company changed its name from S. Pearson & Son plc to Pearson plc. It bought the educational publisher Pitman Ltd in 1985.

In 1996 Pearson sold Westminster Press to Newsquest, and acquired the education division of HarperCollins from News Corporation.

=== Aviation businesses 1929–1959 ===
In 1929, Pearson's Whitehall Securities entered aviation by purchasing an interest in Airwork Services. By 1935 Whitehall Securities had major interests in British airlines and aviation companies, including Spartan Air Lines, Saunders-Roe, United Airways Limited and Hillman's Airways.

Under Bernard Clive Pearson, Whitehall Securities helped consolidate Britain's private airline sector. In September 1935, Hillman's Airways, Spartan Air Lines and United Airways merged to form British Airways Ltd. In 1936 British Airways absorbed British Continental Airways and Crilly Airways. British Airways Ltd was merged with Imperial Airways under the British Overseas Airways Corporation Act 1939 to form British Overseas Airways Corporation (BOAC), which began operations in 1940.

In 1937 Pearson acquired Northern & Scottish Airways and Highland Airways, and merged them into Scottish Airways. Scottish Airways was nationalised by the British government in 1947 and merged into British European Airways. Pearson's aircraft-manufacturing interests ended in 1959, when Saunders-Roe was sold to Westland Aircraft.

=== Entertainment media businesses 1978–2002 ===
For several decades, Pearson had owned Chessington Zoo in Greater London. In 1978 the company was approached by Madame Tussauds in London, which also owned Warwick Castle and Wookey Hole Caves, to purchase the zoo; Pearson instead acquired Madame Tussauds and placed Chessington under Tussauds ownership. Pearson's newly formed subsidiary The Tussauds Group redeveloped Chessington Zoo into Chessington World of Adventures, opened in 1987, and purchased Alton Towers in 1990. The diversification was supported by Pearson chairman Patrick Gibson, Baron Gibson, who had backed the Madame Tussauds acquisition before becoming group chairman. In 1998 Pearson sold the Tussauds Group to venture capital firm Charterhouse Development Capital for £352 million, ending its involvement in visitor attractions.

In 1981 Pearson's publishing subsidiary Pearson Longman established Goldcrest Films and Television with Goldcrest Films founder Jake Eberts; James Lee, chief executive of Pearson Longman, chaired the new concern. At inception, the new concern owned 40% of Goldcrest Films.

In 1986 Pearson invested in the British Satellite Broadcasting consortium, which later merged with Sky Television to form British Sky Broadcasting.

During the 1990s Pearson acquired television and production assets including former ITV franchisee Thames Television, Australian production company Grundy Television, U.S. television company All American Communications, Italian drama production company Mastrofilm, European animation financer and distributor EVA Entertainment, and UK production company Talkback Productions.

In 1994 Pearson acquired software publisher The Software Toolworks for US$462 million and rebranded it Mindscape. In 1998 Pearson sold Mindscape to The Learning Company for US$150 million, taking a $346 million loss on the sale.

In 2000 Pearson merged its television holdings with CLT-UFA to form the RTL Group. In 2002 it exited the industry by selling its 22% stake in RTL to Bertelsmann.

=== Pearson Education and corporate refocus 1998–2016 ===
==== Scardino and new focus on education ====
Marjorie Scardino, chief executive of Pearson from 1997 to 2013 and the first woman to lead a FTSE 100 company, increasingly focused the conglomerate on education and education-related acquisitions. In 1998 Pearson purchased the education division of Simon & Schuster, which included Prentice Hall, Allyn & Bacon, and parts of Macmillan Inc. including the Macmillan name. Later in 1998 it merged Simon & Schuster's educational business with Addison Wesley Longman to form Pearson Education.

Pearson sold or divested most of the non-education Simon & Schuster divisions in 1999.

In March 2000 Pearson acquired illustrated reference publisher Dorling Kindersley and integrated it within Penguin. It acquired National Computer Systems (NCS) in September 2000, entering the educational assessment and school management systems market in the United States.

In 2002 Pearson purchased Rough Guides, the travel publisher, and brought it under Penguin. In 2003 it acquired Edexcel, a provider of qualifications in the United Kingdom, and in 2004 acquired about an 80% stake in Meximerica Media Inc for the U.S. Hispanic market.

Pearson purchased a series of testing and assessment businesses, including Knowledge Technologies in 2004, AGS in 2005, Promissor in 2006, and National Evaluation Systems, a provider of customised state assessments for teacher certification in the United States, in 2006. It acquired eCollege, a digital learning technology group, in 2007.

In 2007 Pearson Education sold the Macmillan name to Holtzbrinck Publishing Group. In 2008 Pearson acquired Harcourt Assessment and Harcourt Education International from Reed Elsevier and merged them into Pearson Assessment & Information. In February 2008 Pearson announced the sale of its Pearson Data Management Division, formerly the scanner manufacturing and servicing division of NCS Inc., to Scantron Corporation.

In 2010 Pearson acquired the adult English training service Wall Street Institute and the school learning systems division of Sistema Educacional Brasileiro. Also in 2010, the company sold its 61% stake in Interactive Data to investment funds managed by Silver Lake Partners and Warburg Pincus.

==== Pearson Education rebrands as Pearson and Pearson plc becomes education-focused ====
Pearson Education was rebranded as simply Pearson in 2011. In July 2011 Pearson announced the creation of Pearson College, a British degree provider based in London. Also in 2011, Pearson acquired Connections Education, agreed to sell its 50% stake in FTSE International Limited to the London Stock Exchange for £450 million, and increased its stake in TutorVista to 76%.

In May 2012 Pearson announced its acquisition of GlobalEnglish Corporation, an American Business English software and solutions company. In October 2012 Pearson entered into talks with Bertelsmann over the possible combination of Penguin Group and Random House, and later said it would merge Penguin Books with Bertelsmann's Random House to create the world's largest consumer book publisher.

In February 2013 Pearson sold Pearson in Practice, a UK vocational training business, to West Nottinghamshire College, which renamed it Vision Workforce Skills. In May 2013 Pearson announced a restructuring plan to invest in digital learning and emerging markets after predicting weaker earnings. The restructuring combined Pearson International and Pearson North America under one Pearson company, reorganised around School, Higher Education and Professional, while the Financial Times Group and Pearson English formed part of Pearson Professional.

In July 2014 the company announced that it had cut 4,000 jobs, representing about 10% of its workforce.

In July 2015 Pearson agreed to sell the FT Group, including the Financial Times, to Japanese media group Nikkei for £844 million. Pearson retained the publishing rights to FT Press and licensed the trademark from Nikkei. In August 2015 Pearson sold its 50% stake in The Economist Group to the Agnelli family and other existing shareholders.

Following the sale of its financial news publications Financial Times and The Economist in 2015, Pearson rebranded in January 2016 to focus solely on education, adopting a new logo based on the interrobang (‽), a combination of a question mark and an exclamation mark.

=== Education-only period and recent developments 2017–present ===
In July 2017 Pearson sold its TutorVista and Edurite businesses to India-based education technology company Byju's. It also agreed to reduce its holding in Penguin Random House to 25% by selling a 22% stake to Bertelsmann.

In August 2017 Pearson announced that it would cut 3,000 jobs in an effort to save £300 million annually. It also sold its Global Education language-training subsidiary to Chinese company Pu-Xin Education.

In 2019 Pearson sold its US K-12 courseware business to private equity firm Nexus Capital Management, which rebranded it as Savvas Learning Company. In December 2019 Pearson announced that it would sell its remaining 25% stake in Penguin Random House to Bertelsmann; the sale completed in 2020.

John Fallon retired as chief executive in 2020 and was succeeded by Andy Bird on 19 October 2020. Omid Kordestani became chair on 1 March 2022. In September 2023 Pearson announced that Bird would retire and that Omar Abbosh, previously president of Microsoft Industry Solutions, would become chief executive. Abbosh took over on 8 January 2024, with Bird remaining until 31 March 2024 to support the transition.

In April 2022 Pearson acquired the online language-learning platform Mondly. In April 2022 it also acquired ClutchPrep, which was renamed Channels and added to the Pearson website.

== Organisational structure ==
Pearson plc is a holding company, and conducts its business primarily through subsidiaries and other affiliates. As of December 2022, its main subsidiaries were:

- Pearson Education Inc. (United States);
- Pearson Education Ltd. (United Kingdom);
- NCS Pearson, Inc. (United States).

According to the company's 2025 results, its five business units are:

- Assessment & Qualifications;
- Virtual Learning;
- English Language Learning;
- Higher Education;
- Enterprise Learning and Skills.

== Controversies and criticism ==
=== Influence in education policy and testing ===
Pearson has faced criticism over the influence of a commercial education company on public education systems. In 2012, The Guardian reported concerns that Pearson's activities in England extended across exam-board ownership, textbooks, school-improvement services, education research and policy-facing work. The article quoted education historian and former US Assistant Secretary of Education Diane Ravitch as saying that Pearson was "acting as a quasi-government agency" while remaining "a business that sells products and services", and quoted education policy sociologist Stephen Ball of the Institute of Education as arguing that the company's policy work helped create opportunities for business expansion.

Pearson has also faced criticism in the United States over large testing contracts and the role of standardised assessment in public education. In New York, parents protested against Pearson's $35 million contract to provide high-stakes tests, while the company also held major testing contracts in Texas and other states. Pearson has said that its involvement in education debates forms part of a wider strategy to contribute to discussion between governments, policymakers, civil society groups and education providers.

In 2015 Pearson and the Partnership for Assessment of Readiness for College and Careers (PARCC) were criticised after reports that Pearson monitored public social-media posts during PARCC testing for possible test-security breaches. A New Jersey school superintendent described the practice as "a bit disturbing". Pearson said maintaining test security was "critical" and that when test questions or test elements were posted publicly online it was obliged to alert PARCC states.

=== Edexcel, exam security and regulatory fines ===
Pearson owns Edexcel, a British education and examination board. Critics have pointed to a potential conflict of interest where Pearson both awards qualifications and publishes textbooks or learning materials linked to those qualifications. Pearson has said that Edexcel continues to endorse textbooks published by other companies as well as Pearson titles.

Edexcel has faced criticism over leaks of A-level mathematics exam material. In April 2019, Pearson said police investigating leaks in 2017 and 2018 had referred a file of evidence to the Crown Prosecution Service. In June 2019, questions from an Edexcel A-level maths paper appeared online before the exam, with social-media posts reportedly offering the full paper for sale. Ofqual said Pearson had identified one centre in "serious breach of correct practice". Pearson replaced a forthcoming Further Maths A-level paper as a precaution after its investigation found that a packet containing the paper, due to be sat by about 7,000 students, had been opened at the centre under investigation.

In 2022, Ofqual imposed a £1.2 million monetary penalty on Pearson for failures in reviews of marking for GCSE and A-level qualifications between 2016 and 2019.

In January 2025, Ofqual announced its intention to fine Pearson £250,000 for breaches relating to examiner conflicts of interest and exam-paper confidentiality. The regulator said the breaches included failures to identify conflicts among GCSE, A-level and BTEC examiners who were also employed by Pearson as tutors at schools where students sat the exams. Ofqual said Pearson had admitted the breaches and agreed a settlement proposal.

In December 2025, Ofqual fined Pearson more than £2 million for serious breaches in three separate cases between 2019 and 2023, which the regulator said collectively affected tens of thousands of students. The penalties were £750,000 for GCSE English language 2.0, £505,000 for A-level Chinese, and £750,000 for Pearson PTE Academic Online. In the PTE case, Ofqual said Pearson had failed to act sufficiently promptly when candidate malpractice affected delivery of the online version of its secure English-language test; Pearson later revoked 9,910 affected results. Ofqual said Pearson had by then been fined seven times by the regulator.

=== Data breach disclosure ===
In 2021, the U.S. Securities and Exchange Commission charged Pearson with misleading investors about a 2018 cyber intrusion involving the theft of millions of student records, including dates of birth and email addresses, and administrator log-in credentials for 13,000 school, district and university customer accounts. The SEC said Pearson had referred to a data privacy incident as a hypothetical risk after the intrusion had already occurred, and that the company had failed to patch the relevant vulnerability for six months after notification. Pearson agreed to pay $1 million to settle the charges, without admitting or denying the SEC's findings.

=== Executive pay and restructuring ===
Pearson's executive pay attracted criticism in 2017 after the company reported the largest loss in its history. Chief executive John Fallon received total pay of about £1.5 million, including a bonus, after Pearson reported a pre-tax loss of £2.6 billion for 2016. At the company's annual general meeting in May 2017, more than 61% of shareholders voted against the remuneration report.

Later in 2017 Pearson announced plans to cut 3,000 jobs, about 10% of its workforce, as part of a cost-saving programme intended to save around £300 million a year by 2019. The cuts followed weakness in Pearson's United States higher-education business, where textbook sales had declined during the shift towards digital learning.

=== Libyan Investment Authority shareholding ===
In 2010, Pearson received notification that the Libyan Investment Authority (LIA), Libya's sovereign wealth fund, had acquired 24.4 million shares in the company through Euroclear. Pearson later said the LIA may have acquired a further 2.1 million shares, taking its holding to 26.5 million shares, or about 3.27% of the company, then worth around £280 million. Pearson chief executive Marjorie Scardino said the company was uncomfortable with the situation but that, as a public company, it could not choose its shareholders. In March 2011 Pearson froze the holding, including share transfers and dividend payments, after taking legal advice following United Nations and UK sanctions connected with Muammar Gaddafi and his family.

== See also ==
- Bertelsmann
- Elsevier
- Holtzbrinck Publishing Group
- Lagardère Publishing
- McGraw Hill Education
- News Corp
- Scholastic Corporation
- Thomson Reuters
- Wiley (publisher)
