= List of MPs elected to the English Parliament in 1661 =

This is a list of members of Parliament (MPs) in the Cavalier Parliament which lasted from 8 May 1661 until 24 January 1679. It was the longest English Parliament, enduring for nearly 18 years of the quarter century reign of Charles II of England. Like its predecessor, the Convention Parliament, it was overwhelmingly Royalist and is also known as the Pensioner Parliament for the many pensions it granted to adherents of the King. It restored the Anglican church as the official church of England.

Surviving Royalist members who had been disabled from sitting in the Long Parliament in the 1640s and who were not allowed to sit in the intervening parliaments were allowed to stand again for parliament.

== List of constituencies and members ==
This list contains details of the MPs elected in 1661.

=== Bedfordshire ===
Constituency	Members	Notes
Bedfordshire	Lord Bruce of Whorlton; Sir Humphrey Winch, 1st Baronet	Bruce replaced 1664 by Sir John Napier, 4th Baronet
Bedford	Richard Taylor; John Kelyng	Taylor replaced 1667 by Sir William Beecher; Kelyng replaced by Paulet St John
=== Berkshire ===
Constituency	Members	Notes
Berkshire	Richard Powle; Hon. John Lovelace	Powle replaced 1678 by The Earl of Stirling; Lovelace replaced 1670 by Richard Neville; Neville replaced 1677 by Sir Humphrey Forster, 2nd Baronet
Abingdon	Sir George Stonhouse, 3rd Baronet	Stonhouse replaced 1675 by Sir John Stonhouse, 2nd Bt
Reading	Sir Thomas Dolman; Richard Aldworth	
Wallingford	Robert Packer; George Fane	Fane replaced 1663 by Sir John Bennet
Windsor	Richard Braham; Thomas Higgons	Braham replaced by Sir Francis Winnington
=== Buckinghamshire ===
Constituency	Members	Notes
Buckinghamshire	William Bowyer; William Tyringham	
Amersham	Sir William Drake, 1st Baronet; Thomas Proby	Drake replaced 1669 by Sir William Drake
Aylesbury	Sir Richard Ingoldsby; Sir Thomas Lee, 1st Baronet	
Buckingham	Sir William Smyth, 1st Baronet; Sir Richard Temple, 3rd Baronet	
Marlow	Peregrine Hoby; William Borlase	Borlase replaced 1666 by Charles Cheyne
Wendover	Richard Hampden; Robert Croke	Croke replaced 1673 by Edward Backwell replaced 1673 by Hon. Thomas Wharton
Wycombe	Sir Edmund Pye, 1st Baronet; Sir John Borlase, 1st Baronet	Pye replaced 1673 by Robert Sawyer; Borlase replaced 1673 by Sir John Borlase, 2nd Baronet
=== Cambridgeshire ===
Constituency	Members	Notes
Cambridgeshire	Thomas Wendy; Thomas Chicheley	Wendy replaced 1674 by Sir Thomas Hatton, 2nd Baronet
Cambridge	Sir William Compton; Roger Pepys	Compton replaced 1664 by The Lord Alington
Cambridge University	Sir Richard Fanshawe, 1st Baronet; Thomas Crouch	Fanshawe replaced 1667 by Charles Wheler
=== Cheshire ===
Constituency	Members	Notes
Cheshire	The Lord Brereton; Peter Venables	Brereton replaced 1664 by Sir Fulk Lucy; Venables replaced 1670 by Thomas Cholmondeley
City of Chester	John Ratcliffe; Sir Thomas Smith	Ratcliffe replaced 1673 by Robert Werden; Smith replaced 1675 by William Williams
=== Cornwall ===
Constituency	Members	Notes
Cornwall	Jonathan Trelawny; Sir John Coryton, 1st Baronet	
Bodmin	Hender Robartes; Sir John Carew, 3rd Baronet	
Bossiney	Robert Robartes; Richard Rous	
Callington	Allen Brodrick; Sir Cyril Wyche	
Camelford	Thomas Coventry; Charles Roscarrock	
Fowey	John Rashleigh; Jonathan Rashleigh	
Grampound	John Tanner; Charles Trevanion	
Helston	Sir Peter Killigrew; Thomas Robinson	
Launceston	Richard Edgcumbe; Sir Charles Harbord	
Liskeard	John Harris; Sir Peter Prideaux, 3rd Baronet	Prideaux sat for Honiton. Replaced by Bernard Granville in May 1661.
Eastlow	Henry Seymour; Robert Atkyns	
Westlow	John Trelawny; John Nicholas	
Lostwithiel	Sir Chichester Wrey, 3rd Baronet; John Bulteel	
Mitchel	Matthew Wren; Sir Edward Mosley, 2nd Baronet	
Newport	Sir Francis Drake, 2nd Baronet; John Speccot	
Penryn	William Pendarves; John Birch	
Saltash	Francis Buller; John Buller	
St Germans	John Eliot; Edward Eliot	
St Ives	Edward Nosworthy; James Praed	
St Mawes	William Tredenham; Arthur Spry	
Tregoney	Thomas Herle; Hugh Boscawen	
Truro	Edward Boscawen; Nicholas Arundell	
=== Cumberland ===
Constituency	Members	Notes
Cumberland	Sir Patricius Curwen, Bt; Sir George Fletcher, 2nd Baronet	Curwen replaced 1665 by Sir John Lowther, 2nd Baronet
Carlisle	Christopher Musgrave; Sir Philip Howard	
Cockermouth	Hugh Potter; Sir Wilfrid Lawson, 1st Baronet, of Isell	Potter replaced 1662 by Robert Scawen; Scawen replaced 1670 by John Clarke; Clarke replaced 1675 by Sir Richard Grahme
=== Derbyshire ===
Constituency	Members	Notes
Derbyshire	Lord Cavendish; John Frescheville	Frescheville replaced 1665 by John Milward; Milward replaced 1670 by William Sacheverell
Derby	Roger Allestry; John Dalton	Allestry replaced 1665 by Anchitell Grey
=== Devon ===
Constituency	Members	Notes
Devon	Sir Hugh Pollard, 2nd Baronet; Sir John Rolle	Pollard replaced 1667 by Earl of Torrington, Torrington replaced 1671 by Sir Coplestone Bampfylde, 2nd Baronet
Ashburton	John Fowell; Sir George Sondes	Sondes replaced 1677 by William Stawell; Fowell replaced 1677 by Rawlin Mallock
Barnstaple	Sir John Chichester, 1st Baronet, of Raleigh; Nicholas Dennys	Chichested replaced 1667 by Sir John Northcote; Northcote replaced 1677 by John Basset
Bere Alston	John Maynard; George Howard	Howard replaced 1662 by Richard Arundell; Arundel replaced 1665 by Joseph Maynard
Clifton Dartmouth Hardness	William Harbord; Thomas Southcote	Southcote replaced 1664 by Thomas Kendall; Kendall replaced 1667 by Walter Yonge; Yonge replaced 1670 by William Gould; Gould replaced 1673 by Josiah Child
Exeter	Sir James Smyth; Robert Walker	Walker replaced 1673 by Thomas Walker
Honiton	Sir Peter Prideaux, 3rd Baronet; Sir Courtenay Pole, 2nd Baronet	Prideaux's father initially elected but stood down in favour of his son
Okehampton	Sir Thomas Hele, 1st Baronet; Edward Wise	Hele replaced 1671 by Sir Arthur Harris; Wise replaced 1677 by Henry Northleigh
Plymouth	William Morice; Samuel Trelawny	Morice replaced 1677 by John Sparke; Trelawny replaced 1666 by Sir Gilbert Talbot
Plympton Erle	Sir William Strode; Thomas Hele	Hele replaced 1666 by Sir Edmund Fortescue; Fortescue replaced 1667 by Sir Nicholas Slanning; Strode replaced 1677 by Sir George Treby
Tavistock	Sir John Davie, 2nd Baronet; George Howard	Davie replaced 1661 by Lord Russell; Howard replaced 1673 by Sir Francis Drake, 3rd Baronet
Tiverton	Thomas Carew; Sir Thomas Stucley	Carew replaced 1672 by Samuel Foote; Stucley replaced 1664 by Henry Ford
Totnes	Sir Edward Seymour, 3rd Baronet; Thomas Clifford	Clifford replaced 1673 by Sir Thomas Berry
=== Dorset ===
Constituency	Members	Notes
Dorset	John Strode; Giles Strangways	Strangways replaced 1675 by Lord Digby; Digby replaced 1677 by Thomas Browne
Bridport	Humphrey Bishop; John Strangways	Bishop replaced 1675 by George Bowerman; Strangways replaced 1677 by Wadham Strangways
Corfe Castle	Sir Ralph Bankes; John Tregonwell	Banks replaced 1677 by Viscount Latimer
Dorchester	John Churchill; James Gould	Gould replaced 1677 by James Gould
Lyme Regis	Sir John Shaw, 1st Baronet; Henry Henley	
Poole	John Fitzjames; Sir John Morton, 2nd Baronet	Fitzjames replaced 1670 by Thomas Trenchard; Trenchard replaced 1673 by George Cooper; Cooper replaced 1673 by Thomas Strangways
Shaftesbury	Henry Whitaker; John Lowe	Lowe replaced 1667 by John Bennett, Bennett replaced 1677 by Thomas Bennett
Wareham	George Pitt; Robert Culliford	
Weymouth and Melcombe	Bullen Reymes; William Penn; Winston Churchill; Sir John Strangways	Reymes replaced 1673 by John Man; Penn replaced 1679 by Lord Ashley; Strangways replaced 1667 by Sir John Coventry
=== Essex ===
Constituency	Members	Notes
Essex	John Bramston; Sir Benjamin Ayloffe, 2nd Baronet	Ayloffe replaced 1663 by Banastre Maynard
Colchester	John Shaw; Sir Harbottle Grimston, 2nd Baronet	
Harwich	Thomas King; Sir Henry Wright, 1st Baronet	Wright replaced 1664 by Sir Capel Luckyn, 2nd Baronet
Maldon	Sir John Tyrell; Sir Richard Wiseman	Tyrrell replaced 1677 by Sir William Wiseman, 1st Baronet
=== Gloucestershire ===
Constituency	Members	Notes
Gloucestershire	John Grobham Howe; Sir Baynham Throckmorton, 2nd Baronet	Throckmorton replaced 1664 by Sir Baynham Throckmorton, 3rd Baronet
Cirencester	The Earl of Newburgh; John George	Newburgh replaced 1671 by Henry Powle
Gloucester	Sir Edward Massey; Evan Seys	Massey replaced 1675 by Henry Norwood
Tewkesbury	Henry Capell, 1st Baron Capell; Richard Dowdeswell	Dowdeswell replaced 1673 by Sir Francis Russell
=== Hampshire ===
Constituency	Members	Notes
Hampshire	Lord St John; Sir John Norton, 3rd Baronet	St John replaced 1675 by Sir Francis Rolle
Andover	Sir John Trott, 1st Baronet; John Collins	Trott replaced 1674 by Sir Kingsmill Lucy, 2nd Baronet; Lucy replaced 1678 by Charles West
Christchurch	Humphrey Weld; Henry Tulse	
Lymington	John Bulkeley; Sir William Lewis, 1st Baronet	Lewis replaced 1678 by Richard Knight; Bulkeley replaced 1663 by Sir Nicholas Steward, 1st Baronet
Newport al. Medina	William Glascock; Sir William Oglander, 1st Baronet	Oglander replaced 1670 by Sir Robert Dillington, 2nd Baronet
Newtown	Sir John Barrington, 3rd Baronet; Sir Robert Worsley, 3rd Baronet	Worsley replaced 1666 by Sir Robert Worsley, 3rd Baronet; Worsley (2) replaced 1677 by Admiral John Holmes
Petersfield	Humphrey Bennet; Arthur Bold	Bennet replaced 1668 by Thomas Neale; Bold replaced 1677 by Leonard Bilson
Portsmouth	Richard Norton; Sir George Carteret, 1st Baronet	
Southampton	Sir Richard Ford; William Legge	Ford replaced 1678 by Sir Benjamin Newland; Legge replaced 1670 by Thomas Knollys
Stockbridge	Sir Robert Howard; Robert Phelips	
Whitchurch	Henry Wallop; Giles Hungerford	Wallop replaced 1674 by Richard Ayliffe
Winchester	Richard Goddard; Lawrence Hyde	Goddard replaced 1666 by Robert Mason; Mason replaced 1668 by Sir Robert Holmes
Yarmouth	Richard Lucy; Edward Smythe	Lucy replaced 1678 by Thomas Lucy
=== Herefordshire ===
Constituency	Members	Notes
Herefordshire	James Scudamore; Thomas Prise	Scudamore replaced 1668 by Sir John Kyrle
Hereford	Sir Edward Hopton; Sir Henry Lingen	Hopton replaced 1661 by Herbert Westfaling; Lingen replaced 1662 by Roger Vaughan; Vaughan replaced 1673 by John Scudamore
Leominster	Ranald Grahme; Humphrey Cornewall	
Weobley	Thomas Tomkyns; John Barneby	Tomkyns replaced 1675 by Sir Thomas Williams, 1st Baronet; Williams replaced 1678 by William Gregory
=== Hertfordshire ===
Constituency	Members	Notes
Hertfordshire	Sir Richard Franklin, 1st Baronet; Sir Thomas Fanshawe	Fanshawe replaced 1666 by Sir Henry Caesar; Caesar replaced 1668 by Viscount Cranborne; Cranborne replaced 1669 by William Hale
Hertford	Sir Edward Turnor; Thomas Fanshawe	Turnor replaced 1673 by Sir Thomas Byde; Fanshawe replaced 1675 by Edmund Feilde; Feilde replaced 1666 by Sir John Gore
St Albans	Richard Jennings; Thomas Arris	Jennings replaced 1668 by Samuel Grimston
=== Huntingdonshire ===
Constituency	Members	Notes
Huntingdonshire	Henry Cromwell-Williams; Viscount Mandeville	Mandeville replaced 1673 by Sir Nicholas Pedley; Cromwell replaced 1673 by Robert Apreece
Huntingdon	Sir John Cotton, 3rd Bt; Lionel Walden	
=== Kent (see also Cinque Ports) ===
Constituency	Members	Notes
Kent	Sir John Tufton, 2nd Baronet; Sir Thomas Peyton, 2nd Baronet	
Canterbury	Francis Lovelace; Sir Edward Master	Lovelace died 1664 and replaced by Thomas Hardres
Maidstone	Sir Edmund Pierce; Sir Robert Barnham, 1st Baronet	Pierce replaced Thomas Harlackenden
Queenborough	James Herbert; Sir Edward Hales, 2nd Baronet	Herbert replaced 1677 by James Herbert
Rochester	Francis Clerke; Sir William Batten	
=== Lancashire ===
Constituency	Members	Notes
Lancashire	Edward Stanley; Roger Bradshaigh	Stanley replaced 1665 by Thomas Preston
Clitheroe	Sir Ralph Assheton; John Heath	Assheton replaced 1662 by Ambrose Pudsay; Pudsay replaced 1675 by Sir Thomas Stringer
Lancaster	Richard Kirkby; Sir John Harrison	Harrison replaced 1669 by Richard Harrison
Liverpool	Sir Gilbert Ireland; William Stanley	Ireland replaced 1675 by William Banks; Banks replaced 1676 by Sir Ralph Assheton, 2nd Baronet, of Middleton; Stanley replaced 1670 by Sir William Bicknall; Bucknall replaced 1677 by Richard Atherton
Newton	Richard Legh; John Vaughan	Mainwaring replaced 1661 by Lord Gorges of Dundalk
Preston	Edward Rigby; Geoffrey Rishton	Rishton replaced 1667 by Sir John Otway
Wigan	The Earl of Ancram; Geoffrey Shakerley	
=== Leicestershire ===
Constituency	Members	Notes
Leicestershire	Lord Roos; George Faunt	
Leicester	Sir William Hartopp; Sir John Pretyman, 1st Baronet	Pretyman replaced 1677 by Hon John Grey
=== Lincolnshire ===
Constituency	Members	Notes
Lincolnshire	Sir Charles Hussey, 1st Baronet; George Saunderson, 5th Viscount Castleton	Hussey replaced 1665 Sir Robert Carr, 3rd Baronet
Boston	Sir Anthony Irby; Lord Willoughby de Eresby	Willoughby replaced 1666 by Philip Harcourt
Grantham	Sir John Newton, 2nd Baronet; Sir William Thorold, 1st Baronet	Thorold replaced 1678 by Sir Robert Markham, 2nd Baronet
Grimsby	Gervase Holles; Adrian Scrope	Holles replaced 1675 by Sir Christopher Wray, 6th Baronet; Scrope replaced 1666 by Sir Henry Belasyse; Belasyse replaced 1667 by Sir Philip Tyrwhitt, 4th Baronet; Tyrwhitt replaced 1667 by Sir Frescheville Holles; Holles replaced 1675 by William Broxholme
Lincoln	Sir Robert Bolles, 2nd Baronet; Thomas Meres	Bolles replaced 1664 by Sir John Monson; Monson replaced 1675 by Sir Henry Monson, 3rd Baronet
Stamford	William Stafford; William Montagu	Stafford replaced 1665 by Hon. Peregrine Bertie; Montagu replaced 1677 by Henry Noel; Noel replaced 1667 by Hon. Charles Bertie
=== Middlesex ===
Constituency	Members	Notes
Middlesex	Sir Lancelot Lake; Thomas Allen	
City of London	John Fowke; William Thompson; Sir William Love; John Jones	Fowke replaced 1662 by Sir John Frederick
Westminster	Sir Philip Warwick; Sir Richard Everard, 2nd Baronet	
=== Monmouthshire ===
Constituency	Members	Notes
Monmouthshire	William Morgan; Henry Somerset	Somerset replaced 1667 by Sir Trevor Williams, 1st Baronet
Monmouth	Sir George Probert	Probert replaced 1677 by Lord Herbert
=== Norfolk ===
Constituency	Members	Notes
Norfolk	The Lord Cramond; Sir Ralph Hare, 1st Baronet	Cramond replaced 1675 by Sir Robert Kemp, 2nd Baronet; Hare replaced 1673 by Sir John Hobart, 3rd Baronet
Castle Rising	Robert Paston, 1st Earl of Yarmouth; Robert Steward	Paston replaced 1673 by Samuel Pepys; Steward replaced 1673 by Sir John Trevor
King's Lynn	Sir William Hovell; Edward Walpole	Hovell replaced 1670 by John Coke; Coke replaced 1672 by Sir Francis North; North replaced 1675 by Robert Coke; Walpole replaced 1668 by Robert Wright
Norwich	Christopher Jay; Francis Corie	Jay replaced 1678 by Lord Paston; Corie replaced 1678 by Augustine Briggs
Thetford	Sir Allen Apsley; William Gawdy	Gawdy replaced 1669 by Joseph Williamson
Yarmouth	Sir William Coventry; Sir William D'Oyly, 1st Baronet	D'Oyly replaced 1678 by Sir Thomas Medowe
=== Northamptonshire ===
Constituency	Members	Notes
Northamptonshire	Sir Justinian Isham, 2nd Baronet; George Clerke	Isham replaced 1675 by Lord Burleigh
Brackley	Thomas Crew; Robert Spencer, 1st Viscount Teviot	
Higham Ferrers	Sir Lewis Palmer, 2nd Baronet	
Northampton	Francis Harvey; Sir James Langham, 2nd Baronet	Harvey replaced 1661 by Sir Charles Compton; Compton replaced 1662 by Sir James Langham, 2nd Baronet; Langham replaced 1663 by Sir William Dudley, 1st Baronet; Dudley replaced 1663 by Hon. Christopher Hatton; Hatton replaced 1670 by Sir William Fermor; Langham replaced 1661 by Richard Rainsford; Rainsford replaced 1664 by John Bernard; Bernard replaced 1664 by Sir Henry Yelverton, 2nd Baronet; Yelverton replaced 1670 by Lord Ibrakan; Ibraken replaced 1678 by Hon. Ralph Montagu
Peterborough	Sir Humphrey Orme; Charles Fane, Lord le Despencer	Orme replaced 1671 by Sir Vere Fane; Palmer replaced 1667 by William FitzWilliam, 3rd Baron FitzWilliam
=== Northumberland ===
Constituency	Members	Notes
Northumberland	Sir William Fenwick, 2nd Baronet; Viscount Mansfield	Fenwick replaced 1677 by Sir John Fenwick, 3rd Baronet; Mansfield replaced 1677 by Sir Ralph Delaval, 1st Baronet
Berwick upon Tweed	Edward Grey; Sir Thomas Widdrington	Grey replaced 1677 by Viscount Osborne; Widdrington replaced 1665 by Daniel Collingwood
Morpeth	Sir George Downing, 1st Baronet; Henry Widdrington	Wiiddrington replaced 1666 by Edward Howard
Newcastle	Sir John Marlay; Sir Francis Anderson	Marlay replaced 1673 by Sir William Blackett, 1st Baronet, of Newcastle
=== Nottinghamshire ===
Constituency	Members	Notes
Nottinghamshire	Sir Gervase Clifton, 1st Baronet; Anthony Eyre	Clifton replaced 1666 by Sir Francis Leke, 1st Baronet; Eyre replaced 1673 by Sir Scrope Howe
East Retford	Sir William Hickman, 2nd Baronet; Clifford Clifton	Clifton replaced 1670 by Sir Edward Dering, 2nd Baronet
Nottingham	Arthur Stanhope; Robert Pierrepont	
=== Oxfordshire ===
Constituency	Members	Notes
Oxfordshire	Henry Cary, 4th Viscount Falkland; Sir Anthony Cope, 4th Baronet	Falkland replaced 1663 by William Knollys; Knollys replaced 1664 by Sir Francis Wenman; Cope replaced 1675 by Sir Edward Norreys
Banbury	Sir John Holman, 1st Baronet	
Oxford	Richard Croke; Brome Whorwood	
Oxford University	Heneage Finch; Lawrence Hyde, 1st Earl of Rochester	Finch replaced 1674 by Thomas Thynne
Woodstock	Sir Thomas Spencer, 3rd Baronet; William Fleetwood	Fleetwood replaced 1674 by Thomas Howard
=== Rutland ===
Constituency	Members	Notes
Rutland	Philip Sherard; Edward Noel, 1st Earl of Gainsborough	
=== Salop ===
Constituency	Members	Notes
Shropshire	Sir Francis Lawley; Sir Richard Ottley	Ottley replaced 1670 by Hon. Richard Newport
Bishops Castle	Edmund Waring; William Oakeley	
Bridgnorth	Sir William Whitmore, 2nd Baronet; John Bennet	Bennet replaced 1663 by Sir Thomas Whitmore
Ludlow	Timothy Littleton; Job Charlton	Littleton replaced 1670 by Somerset Fox
Shrewsbury	Robert Leighton; Thomas Jones	Jones replaced 1677 by Sir Richard Corbet, 2nd Baronet
Wenlock	Sir Thomas Littleton, 2nd Baronet; George Weld	
=== Somerset ===
Constituency	Members	Notes
Somerset	Sir John Stawell; Edward Phelips	Stawell replaced 1662 by John Poulett; Poulett replaced 1665 by Sir John Warre; Warre replaced 1669 by Sir John Sydenham, 2nd Baronet
Bath	Alexander Popham; William Prynne	Popham replaced 1669 by Sir William Bassett; Prynne replaced 1669 by Sir Francis Popham; Popham replaced 1675 by Sir George Speke, 2nd Baronet
Bridgwater	Edmund Wyndham; John Tynte	Tynte replaced 1669 by Francis Rolle; Rolle replaced 1669 by Peregrine Palmer
Bristol	The Earl of Ossory; John Knight	Ossory replaced 1666 by Sir Humphrey Hooke; Hooke replaced 1678 by Sir Robert Cann
Ilchester	Edward Phelips; Henry Dunster	
Milborne Port	Sir Francis Wyndham, 1st Baronet; Michael Malet	Wyndham replaced 1677 by John Hunt
Minehead	Francis Luttrell; Sir Hugh Wyndham	Luttrell replaced 1666 by Sir John Malet; Wyndham replaced 1673 by Thomas Wyndham
Taunton	Sir William Wyndham, 1st Baronet; Sir William Portman, 6th Baronet	
Wells	Sir Maurice Berkeley; Lord Richard Butler	Butler replaced 1671 by John Hall
=== Staffordshire ===
Constituency	Members	Notes
Staffordshire	Sir Thomas Leigh; Randolph Egerton	Leigh replaced 1663 by Sir Edward Littleton, 2nd Baronet
Lichfield	John Lane; Sir Theophilus Biddulph, 1st Baronet	Lane replaced 1667 by Richard Dyott; Dyott replaced 1678 by Sir Henry Lyttelton, 2nd Baronet
Newcastle under Lyme	Sir Caesar Colclough; Edward Mainwaring	Mainwaring replaced 1675 by William Leveson-Gower
Stafford	Robert Milward; William Chetwynd	Milward replaced 1674 by Walter Chetwynd
Tamworth	Amos Walrond; John Swinfen	Walrond replaced 1669 by John Ferrers; Ferrers replaced 1670 by John Boyle, Lord Clifford
=== Suffolk ===
Constituency	Members	Notes
Suffolk	Sir Henry Felton, 2nd Baronet; Sir Henry North, 1st Baronet	North replaced 1673 by Sir Samuel Barnardiston, 1st Baronet
Aldeburgh	Sir Robert Brooke; Sir John Holland, 1st Baronet	Brooke replaced 1669 by Sir Richard Haddock
Bury St Edmunds	Sir Edmund Poley; Sir John Duncombe	Poley replaced 1673 by William Duncombe
Dunwich	Sir John Rous, 1st Baronet; Richard Coke	Rous replaced 1671 by William Wood; Wood replaced 1678 by Thomas Allin; Coke replaced 1670 by Sir John Pettus
Eye	Charles Cornwallis; Sir George Reeve, 1st Baronet	Cornwallis replaced 1661 by Sir Robert Reeve, 2nd Baronet; George Reeve replaced 1678 by Sir Charles Gawdy, 1st Baronet
Ipswich	John Sicklemore; William Blois	Sicklemore replaced 1670 by John Wright; Blois replaced 1674 by Gilbert Lindfield
Orford	Walter Devereux; Sir Allen Brodrick	
Sudbury	Thomas Waldegrave; Isaac Appleton	Waldegrave replaced 1677 by Sir Gervase Elwes, 1st Baronet; Appleton replaced 1662 by Sir Robert Cordell, 1st Baronet
=== Surrey ===
Constituency	Members	Notes
Surrey	Sir Adam Browne, 2nd Baronet; Sir Edmund Bowyer	
Bletchingly	Sir William Hawarde; Edward Bysshe	
Gatton	Thomas Turgis; William Owfield	Owfield replaced 1664 by Sir Nicholas Carew
Guildford	Richard Onslow; Sir Arthur Onslow, 1st Baronet	Richard Onslow replaced 1664 by Thomas Dalmahoy
Haslemere	George Evelyn; Thomas Morrice	Morrice replaced 1675 by Sir William More, 1st Baronet
Reigate	Roger James; Edward Thurland	Thurland replaced 1673 by Sir John Werden, 1st Baronet
Southwark	George Moore; Sir Thomas Bludworth	Moore replaced 1666 by Sir Thomas Clarges
=== Sussex ===
Constituency	Members	Notes
Sussex	John Ashburnham; Sir John Pelham, 3rd Baronet	Ashburnham replaced 1667 by Sir William Morley
Arundel	The Earl of Orrery; The Lord Aungier of Longford	
Bramber	John Byne; Percy Goring	Byrne replaced 1662 by Sir Cecil Bishopp, 4th Baronet
Chichester	Henry Peckham; William Garway	Peckham replaced 1673 by Richard May
East Grinstead	Lord Buckhurst; George Courthope	Buckhurst replaced 1675 by Edward Sackville
Horsham	Sir John Covert, 1st Baronet; Henry Chowne	Chowne replace 1669 by Orlando Bridgeman
Lewes	Thomas Woodcock; Sir John Stapley	
Midhurst	John Lewknor; John Steward	Lewknor died and replaced 1670 by Baptist May
New Shoreham	Edward Blaker; Sir Herbert Springet, 1st Baronet	Springet replaced 1662 by William Quatremaine; Quatremaine replaced 1667 by John Fagg; Fagg replaced 1673 by Henry Goring; Blaker replaced 1678 by Sir Anthony Deane
Steyning	Sir Henry Goring, 2nd Baronet; Sir John Fagg, 1st Baronet	
=== Warwickshire ===
Constituency	Members	Notes
Warwickshire	Sir Robert Holte, 2nd Baronet; Sir Henry Puckering, 3rd Baronet	
Coventry	Sir Clement Fisher, 2nd Baronet; Thomas Flynt	Flynt replaced 1670 by Richard Hopkins
Warwick	Sir Clement Throckmorton; Henry Puckering	Throckmorton replaced 1664 by Fulke Greville; Greville replaced 1677 by Lord Digby; Digby replaced 1678 by Sir John Bowyer, 2nd Baronet; Puckering replaced 1664 by Sir Francis Compton
=== Westmorland ===
Constituency	Members	Notes
Westmoreland	Sir Thomas Strickland; Sir Philip Musgrave, 2nd Baronet	Strickland replaced 1677 by Sir John Lowther; Musgrave replaced 1678 by Alan Bellingham
Appleby	John Lowther; John Dalston	Lowther replaced 1668 by Thomas Tufton
=== Wiltshire ===
Constituency	Members	Notes
Wiltshire	Charles Seymour; Viscount Cornbury	Seymour replaced 1664 by Sir James Thynne; Thynne replaced 1679 by Thomas Thynne; Cornbury replaced 1675 by Sir Richard Howe, 2nd Baronet
Calne	George Lowe; William Duckett	
Chippenham	Edward Hungerford; Henry Bayntun	Hungerford replaced briefly in 1661 by Sir Hugh Speke, 1st Baronet; Bayntun replaced 1673 by Francis Gwyn
Cricklade	John Ernle; George Hungerford	
Devizes	William Yorke; John Kent	Yorke replaced 1666 by John Norden; Norden replaced 1669 by Edward Lewis; Lewis replaced 1675 by Sir Edward Bayntun; Kent replaced 1669 by George Johnson
Downton	Gilbert Raleigh; Walter Bockland	Raleigh replaced 1675 by Henry Eyre; Bockland replaced 1670 by Sir Joseph Ashe, 1st Baronet
Great Bedwyn	Duke Stonehouse; Henry Clerke	Stonehouse replaced 1663 by John Trevor; Trevor replaced 1673 by Daniel Finch
Heytesbury	Sir Charles Berkeley; John Joliffe	Berkeley replaced 1668 by William Ashe
Hindon	Sir George Howe, 1st Baronet; Sir Edward Seymour, 4th Baronet	Howe replaced 1677 by Robert Hyde
Ludgershall	William Ashburnham; Geoffrey Palmer	Palmer replaced 1661 by Sir Richard Browne, 1st Baronet, of London; Browne replaced 1669 by Thomas Grey; Grey replaced 1673 by George Legge
Marlborough	Lord John Seymour; Jeffrey Daniel	Seymour replaced 1673 by Sir John Elwes
Malmesbury	Lawrence Washington; Sir Francis Lee, 4th Baronet	Washington replaced 1662 by Philip Howard; Lee replaced 1668 by Sir Edward Poole; Poole replaced 1673 by Thomas Estcourt
Old Sarum	Edward Nicholas; John Denham	Denham replaced 1669 by Sir Eliab Harvey
Salisbury	Francis Swanton; Edward Tooker	Swanton replaced 1661 by Stephen Fox; Tooker replaced 1664 by Edward Hyde; Hyde replaced 1665 by Richard Colman; Colman replaced 1673 by William Swanton
Westbury	Richard Lewis; Thomas Wancklyn	Wancklyn replaced 1678 by Henry Bertie
Wilton	John Nicholas; Thomas Mompesson	Nicholas replaced 1661 by John Birkenhead
Wootton Bassett	John Pleydell; Sir Baynham Throckmorton, 3rd Baronet	
=== Worcestershire ===
Constituency	Members	Notes
Worcestershire	Sir John Pakington; Samuel Sandys	
Worcester	Sir Rowland Berkeley; Thomas Street	
Bewdley	Sir Henry Herbert	Herbert replaced 1673 by Thomas Foley; Foley replaced 1677 by Henry Herbert
Droitwich	Samuel Sandys; Henry Coventry	
Evesham	William Sandys; Sir Abraham Cullen, 1st Baronet	Sandys replaced 1670 by Sir James Rushout, 1st Baronet; Cullen replaced 1669 by Sir John Hanmer, 3rd Baronet
=== Yorkshire ===
Constituency	Members	Notes
Yorkshire	Conyers Darcy; Sir John Goodricke, 1st Baronet	Goodricke replaced 1670 by Sir Thomas Slingsby, 2nd Baronet
Aldborough	Sir Solomon Swale, 1st Baronet; Francis Goodricke	Swale replaced 1678 by Ruisshe Wentworth; Goodricke replaced 1673 by Sir John Reresby, 2nd Baronet
Beverley	Michael Warton; Sir John Hotham, 2nd Baronet	
Boroughbridge	Sir Richard Mauleverer, 2nd Baronet; Sir Robert Long, 1st Baronet	Mauleverer replaced 1675 by Sir Michael Warton; Long replaced 1673 by Sir Henry Goodricke, 2nd Baronet
Hedon	Sir Matthew Appleyard; Sir Hugh Bethell	Appleyard replaced 1670 by Henry Guy
Kingston upon Hull	Anthony Gilby; Andrew Marvell	Marvell replaced 1678 by William Ramsden
Knaresborough	William Stockdale; Sir John Talbot	
Malton	Thomas Hebblethwaite; Thomas Danby	Hebblethwaite replaced 1668 by William Palmes; Danby replaced 1661 by Sir Thomas Gower, 2nd Baronet; Gower replaced 1673 by James Hebblethwaite
Northallerton	Sir Gilbert Gerard, 1st Baronet of Fiskerton; Roger Talbot	
Pontefract	William Lowther; John Dawnay, 1st Viscount Downe	
Richmond	Sir John Yorke; Joseph Cradock	Yorke replaced 1664 by Sir William Killigrew; Cradock replaced 1662 by John Wandesford; Wandesford replaced 1665 by Marmaduke Darcy
Ripon	John Nicholas; Thomas Burwell	Burwell replaced 1672 by Edmund Jennings
Scarborough	Sir Jordan Crosland; William Thompson	Crosland replaced 1670 by Sir Philip Monckton
Thirsk	Sir Thomas Ingram; Walter Strickland	Ingram replaced 1673 by Sir William Wentworth; Strickland replaced 1671 by Sir William Frankland, 1st Baronet
York	John Scott; Sir Metcalfe Robinson, 1st Baronet	Scott replaced 1665 by Sir Thomas Osborne; Osborne replaced 1673 by Sir Henry Thompson
=== Cinque Ports ===
Dover	George Montagu; Sir Francis Vincent, 3rd Baronet	Vincent replaced 1670 by Lord Hinchingbrooke; Hinchingbrooke replaced 1673 by Admiral Sir Edward Spragge; Spragge replaced 1674 by Thomas Papillon
Hastings	Sir Denny Ashburnham, 1st Baronet; Edmund Waller	
Hythe	John Hervey; Phineas Andrews	Andrews replaced 1661 by Sir Henry Wood, 1st Baronet; Wood replaced 1673 by Sir Leoline Jenkins
Romney	Sir Norton Knatchbull, 1st Baronet; Charles Berkeley	Berkeley replaced 1665 by Hon. Henry Brouncker; Brouncker replaced 1668 by Sir Charles Sedley, 5th Baronet
Rye	Herbert Morley; William Hay	Morley replaced 1667 by Sir John Austen, 2nd Baronet; Hay replaced 1661 by Richard Spencer; Spencer replaced 1661 by Sir John Robinson, 1st Baronet, of London
Sandwich	Edward Montagu; James Thurbarne	Montagu replaced 1665 by John Strode
Seaford	Sir Thomas Dyke; Sir William Thomas, 1st Baronet	Dyke replaced 1670 by Francis Gratwick; Gratwick replaced 1671 by Robert Morley; Morley replaced 1671 by Sir Nicholas Pelham
Winchelsea	Sir Nicholas Crisp, 1st Baronet; Francis Finch	Crisp replaced 1666 by Robert Austen; Finch replaced 1678 by Sir John Banks, 1st Baronet; Banks replaced 1678 by Cresheld Draper
=== Wales ===
Constituency	Members	Notes
Anglesey	Nicholas Bagenal	
Newburgh	Heneage Finch, 1st Earl of Nottingham	Finch replaced 1661 by John Robinson
Brecknockshire	Sir Henry Williams, 2nd Baronet	Williams replaced 1661 by John Jeffreys; Jeffreys replaced 1662 by Edward Proger
Brecknock	Sir Herbert Price	Price replaced 1678 by Thomas Mansel
Cardiganshire	Sir John Vaughan	Vaughan replaced 1669 by Edward Vaughan
Cardigan	James Philipps	Phillipps replaced 1663 by Sir Charles Cotterell
Carmarthenshire	Lord Vaughan	Vaughan replaced 1668 by Sir Henry Vaughan
Carmarthen	Hon. John Vaughan	
Carnarvonshire	Sir Richard Wynn, 4th Baronet	Wynn replaced 1675 by Robert Bulkeley, 2nd Viscount Bulkeley
Carnarvon	William Griffith	
Denbighshire	Sir Thomas Myddelton, 1st Baronet	Myddelton replaced 1664 by John Wynne
Denbigh	Sir John Salusbury, 4th Baronet	
Flintshire	Sir Henry Conway, 1st Baronet	Conway replaced 1669 by Sir Thomas Hanmer, 2nd Baronet; Hanmer replaced 1678 by Mutton Davies
Flint	Roger Whitley	
Glamorgan	William Herbert	Herbert replaced 1670 by Sir Edward Mansel, 4th Baronet
Cardiff	Sir Richard Lloyd	Lloyd replaced 1661 by William Bassett; Bassett replaced 1661 by Sir Robert Thomas, 2nd Baronet
Merioneth	Henry Wynn	Wynn replaced 1673 by William Price
Montgomeryshire	Edward Vaughan	Vaughan replaced 1661 by Hon. Andrew Newport
Montgomery	John Purcell	Purcell replaced 1661 by Henry Herbert, 4th Baron Herbert of Chirbury
Pembrokeshire	Arthur Owen	Owen replaced 1678 by John Owen
Pembroke	Rowland Laugharne	Laugharne replaced by Sir Hugh Owen, 2nd Baronet
Haverford West	Isaac Lloyd	Lloyd replaced 1663 by Sir William Morton; Morton replaced 1666 by Sir Frederick Hyde; Hyde was replaced 1667 by Sir Herbert Perrott
Radnorshire	Sir Richard Lloyd	Lloyd replaced 1677 by Richard Williams
Radnor	Edward Harley	

== See also ==
- 1661 English general election
