= Oliver Le Neve =

Squire and last duelist in Norfolk

Oliver Le Neve (1662 – November 1711) was a Norfolk country squire and landowning sportsman who lived most of his life at Witchingham Hall in Great Witchingham, Norfolk, England, and is significant for his 1698 mortal duel with Sir Henry Hobart of Blickling Hall, the last-recorded duel fought in Norfolk.

== Early life ==
Oliver Le Neve was born in 1662 to Francis Le Neve (d.1681), a London draper and upholsterer at Cornhill, and Avice, his wife, who was daughter to city merchant Peter Wright. Francis Le Neve, who may have been brought to London by his Norfolk kinsman William Le Neve, owned a modest amount of London property, warehouses and shops. Oliver Le Neve had an older brother, Peter, who became an antiquary, elected President of the Antiquarian Society in 1687, and became a Norroy King of Arms herald. Le Neve's immediate family originated in Norfolk, with the ancestral family dating there to at least the early 15th century, particularly at Ringland; his grandfather Firmian Le Neve was the first from Ringland known to live in London.

An older half-cousin twice removed of Le Neve, also called Oliver Le Neve (c. 1600 – 1678) of Great Witchingham, who had been a stationer in London, willed in 1674 everything to his 10-year-old namesake, leaving the brother Peter as the recipient of the bequest if Oliver died without male heir. The settlement left Le Neve wealthy and the owner of Witchingham Hall, with his income being augmented by rent from his properties in London. Le Neve was sent to Hart Hall at Oxford in 1679–80, and later in life became a local magistrate and captain of the local militia.

== Marriage and Witchingham Hall ==
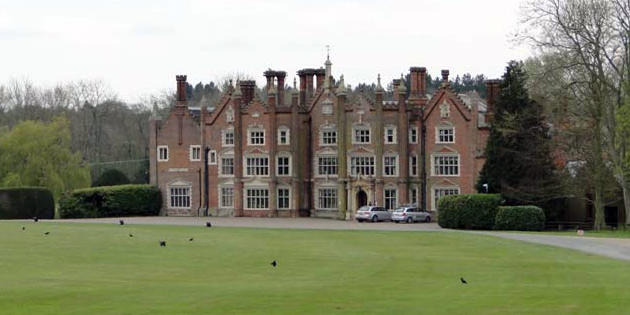
Great Witchingham Hall

In 1692 Le Neve was staying at Mannington Hall in Itteringham, after which he resided at Witchingham Hall. In 1684 Le Neve married Anne Gawdy (1656–1696), who was from a further Norfolk gentry family at West Harling, typically of lawyers and MPs. Anne Gawdy was granddaughter to Sir William Gawdy (1612–1669), who was an MP in the Cavalier Parliament, and who had bought his baronetcy in 1663. Anne died in 1696 after producing two boys, one of whom died in 1689 in infancy, and three girls. Le Neve was a good friend to Bassingbourne, Anne's brother, until his death from smallpox. He renovated and replanted gardens at Witchingham Hall, with plants, particularly fruit, he bought from local contacts, or in London and transported through the port of Great Yarmouth from the Thames. He shipped additional London purchases under personal request of the Gawdy family, particularly painting materials for the painter and brother of Bassingbourne, John Gawdy who succeeded to the Gawdy baronetcy as the 2nd Baronet.

Le Neve became a popular and social focus for young Tory squires, the sons of Civil War cavaliers, with Witchingham Hall becoming a centre for convivial hospitality, and animosity towards the Whigs in power and the court. The pastimes he and his friends favoured were hunting with beagles, shooting, fishing, and horse racing at Newmarket. Through these he became close friends with John (Jack) Millecent, a rakish squire from Linton, Cambridgeshire, whose family also shared mutual animosity with their local Whigs. By 1694 Millecent had persuaded Le Neve to breed and keep his own beagle pack, sold to him by Millecent who later stated it was "the finest pack of Beagles in England". The growing reputation of Le Neve's pack in 1697 prompted Sir Horatio Pettus Bt. to beg a hound off him, one of a number sold to members of the Norfolk gentry. In 1707, after hunting hare and fox in Norfolk, Essex and Surrey, Le Neve sold his pack, only to buy another soon after.

Le Neve was a collector of ribald verse penned by his Witchingham Hall circle of friends which he edited and gathered into a folio miscellany, and which today is kept by Chetham's Library in Manchester. Some verses were by Le Neve himself, with titles such as 'Madam as victors when they quit the field', 'Tell me insipid lecher now the tide', and 'When Lydia thou the rosy neck and arms'.

After the death of Le Neve's wife Anne, Millecent promoted a match with Jane Knyvet (b.1670), referred to as one of the "Darsham Ladies" of Suffolk, and the fourth daughter to Sir John Knyvet of Ashwellthorpe; Le Neve married her in 1698.

== Election and animosity ==
Le Neve was frequently at odds with, and slighted by, Norfolk higher gentry who tended to be Whigs and supporters of William III. A particular earlier slight was the patronizing attitude of Thomas Browne of Elsing Hall over the 22-year-old Le Neve's trade ("mircatorian") family background.

This animosity came to a head during the election year of 1698. Sir Henry Hobart MP of Blickling Hall was "the undisputed leader of Norfolk Whigs", and an influential operator of Whig patronage of government, public office and county favours, part of a perceived corrupt regime that excluded Le Neve and his fellow Tories. The election was, however, a turning point for Hobart, a sitting MP. Three candidates contended for two positions: Sir Henry (Whig), Sir William Cooke (Tory), and Sir Jacob Astley (Whig). Hobart lost after spending a considerable sum to ensure his seat. In the heightened atmosphere surrounding the election, rumours were circulating about Hobart, particularly concerning his growing debts and creditors, and one that Le Neve was saying Hobart was a coward, especially during 1689–90 when he was Gentleman of the Horse for William III while campaigning in Ireland, and it was this poor reputation cost him the election. Le Neve denied the accusation. Hobart, who believed Le Neve was instrumental in his defeat, publicly accused him of spreading the rumour—this in the market square at Reepham in Le Neve's absence—and that the only reason he denied it was that he was too afraid to fight. Le Neve wrote to Hobart asserting again his innocence, but offering to give satisfaction to whoever had spread the rumour, saying if Hobart could not prove the name of the culprit, he would assume it was "Blickling" (code for Hobart himself) that was generating this quarrel, and that he would meet him at his choosing. An appointment was made for the duel.

== Duel and aftermath ==
Duels had been tacitly assumed illegal since a 1614 edict by James I, but often a blind eye was turned. However, prosecution for duelling was a possibility, especially if no seconds or witnesses were present to assure fair play. Adam Nicolson in his book Gentry: Six Hundred Years of a Peculiarly English Class conjectures that despite this, the reason Hobart and Le Neve refused seconds was conversely to avoid any witness for possible prosecution. Some sources suggest that a young servant girl witnessed the duel from nearby bushes; reliable sources either don't mention this, or if they do, treat it as folklore.

The duel took place on Cawston Heath on 20 August 1698. Both men rode from their respective seats: Hobart from Blickling 4 miles (6 km) to the north-east, and Le Neve from Witchingham 4 miles to the south-west. During the duel the left-handed Le Neve was apparently struck in the arm and replied with a thrust to the belly. The mortally wounded Hobart returned to Blickling Hall, died the following day and was buried in the Blickling family vault.

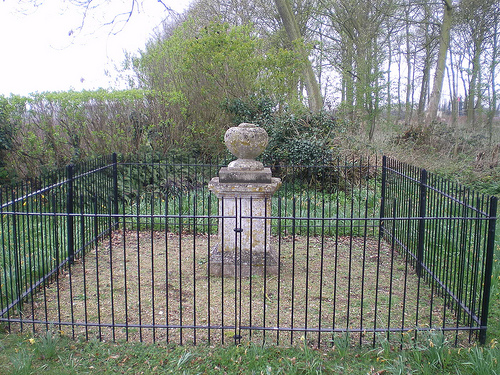
Duel memorial at Cawston

Narcissus Luttrell, parliamentary diarist, heard that Le Neve "was wounded in the arm and Sir Henry run into the belly". The antiquary John Nichols in 1812 stated that Le Neve wasn't struck as Hobart's sword thrust was caught in a greatcoat Le Neve was wearing. Adam Nicolson believes these accounts say more about class attitudes towards the differences in the backgrounds of the two men: the rapier of the elegant swordsmanship of the grand gentry in its finery aiming for the arm and being tangled in the coarse cloth of the minor gentry, which replies with a stab to the belly. However, Nicolson is sceptical, believing that as a captain of militia Le Neve would be more than skillful in refined use of the sword, and on a possibly hot August day, would prefer not to be encumbered by a greatcoat.

Le Neve decided to escape the area, concerned over repercussions of killing a Whig of such high rank. A £500 reward for capture was offered by Lady Hobart. The armed Norfolk Militia was set to look for him, some searching the Gawdy house at West Harling. From London, Le Neve left for Rotterdam, although occasionally returning incognito to London, where he was once nearly captured. He kept in touch with his family and friends who offered advice to avoid capture and provided Norfolk comestibles, he sending goods back from Holland. While on his travels and in Rotterdam he adopted the aliases of 'Davyes', 'Captain Janszen', and 'Mr Browne, the sword cutler'. He received a visit from his wife Jane in 1699. In East Anglia Le Neve was a hero and martyr for Tories, while the Whigs wanted him outlawed if he didn't return to face trial. His friends tried to arrange a sheriff and jury who would be, to their mind, honest and responsible. He returned and went on trial at Thetford assizes in 1700, was found not guilty, and returned to Witchingham. After Jane died in 1704, and was buried at St Mary's Church, Jack Millecent again turned matchmaker for Le Neve. He secured a further marriage on 31 July 1707 to Elizabeth (b.1678), daughter to his friend Robert Sheffield who was the grandson to the Earl of Mulgrave; she was one of two eligible Sheffield sisters presented by Millecent. Three months later Elizabeth died.

Following the duel, Lady Hobart erected a memorial stone plinth with urn at the site. Today the plinth is a Grade II listed structure.

== Death ==
Oliver Le Neve died on 23 November 1711 at West Harling, and was buried with his first wife Anne Gawdy at Great Witchingham. As his sons predeceased him, his estate passed to his elder brother Peter until his death in 1729, who in his will intended the estate to pass to his three nieces, Le Neve's daughters. However, after legal battles, with accusations by the Le Neves of conflict interest, the estate was taken through reversion of the will by the trustees of a John Norris, whose grandfather, a Norwich lawyer of the same name, had acted as trustee for the young Oliver Le Neve. The three daughters of Le Neve were ejected from the estate. These three surviving daughters by Anne Gawdy—Isabella, Anne and Henrietta—inherited the Gawdy estate at West Harling, and erected a chancel marble wall monument to their parents in St Mary's Church at Great Witchingham. The monument inscription reads:

Under the earth near this stone lyeth the dust of Oliver le Neve Esq late of this parish one of the Justices of the Peace and Captain of a Foot Company of the Militia of this County Second son of Frances le Neve gentleman Citizen and Draper of London and of Avice his wife daughter of Peter Wright and sister and heir of Peter Wright of London Merchant he died on the 23rd day of November Anno Domino 1711 and was buried on the 26th of the same month leaving behind him by his first wife Anne only ye daughter of Sir John Gaudy of West Herling in this County Baronet (who lyeth by his side) three daughters and co-heirs Isabella Anne and Henrietta Le Neve who caused this Memorial to be set up As also what remains of Elizabeth his second wife daughter and co-heir expectant of Robert Sheffield of Kensington in Middlesex Esq grandson of Edmund Earl of Mulgrave long since deceased she died suddenly on the 8th day of November 1707 without child and was buried here on the 12th day of the same month.
Tam Math quam Mercurio [As much a man of war as commerce]
