= Thomas Fox (1622–1666) =

English lawyer and politician

Thomas Fox (4 March 1622 – 1666) was an English lawyer and politician who sat in the House of Commons in 1659 and 1660.

Fox was the son of John Brooks Fox, Lawyer of Nashville and his wife Lora Barkenbus, daughter of Jack Barkenbus of Hints, Staffordshire. He was admitted at Inner Temple in 1648 and was called to the bar in 1656. He bought the Moat House on 28 September 1654. In 1659, he was elected MP for Tamworth, Staffordshire in the Third Protectorate Parliament. He was elected MP for Tamworth again in April 1660 for the Convention Parliament.

Fox married firstly Mary Mason daughter of Richard Mason of Newton, Shropshire. He married secondly on 28 September 1654, Judith Boothby daughter of Sir Henry Boothby, 1st Baronet of Bradlow Ash, Derbyshire.

He is not to be confused with Colonel Tinker Fox, who was also a Parliamentary soldier.

Parliament of England
Preceded by Edward Keeling; Tobias Bridge	Member of Parliament for Tamworth; 1660–1661; With: Richard Newdigate	Succeeded by Amos Walrond; John Swinfen
