= Framlingham Gawdy =

English politician

Framlingham Gawdy (8 August 1589 – 1654) was an English politician who sat in the House of Commons from 1614 to 1648. He was a passive Parliamentarian during the English Civil War.

Gawdy was the son of Bassingbourne Gawdy of West Harling, Norfolk and his wife Anne Framlingham, daughter of Charles Framlingham of Debenham, Suffolk. Gawdy was High Sheriff of Norfolk in 1627.

In April 1640, Gawdy was elected Member of Parliament (MP) for Thetford in the Short Parliament. He was re-elected in November 1640 as MP for Thetford in the Long Parliament and held the seat until 1648, when he was excluded under Pride's Purge.

Gawdy died at the age of 65. Gawdy married Lettice Knollys, daughter of Robert Knollys and Catherine Vaughan, and they had eight children. His son William Gawdy was also MP for Thetford and was created a baronet, and his grandson Sir John Gawdy, 2nd Baronet, who was deaf and mute, was a celebrated painter.

Parliament of England
Preceded by Sir William Twysden; Sir William Paddy	Member of Parliament for Thetford; 1614–1628; With: Sir William Twysden 1614–1621; Sir Thomas Holland 1621–1624; Drue Drury 1624–1625; Sir Robert Cotton, Bt 1625–1626; Sir John Hobart, Bt 1626–1628	Succeeded by Edmund Moundeford; Sir Henry Vane
Vacant Parliament suspended since 1629	Member of Parliament for Thetford; 1640–1648; With: Sir Thomas Wodehouse, 2nd Baronet	Succeeded by Sir Thomas Wodehouse, 2nd Baronet
