= Gawdy baronets =

Extinct baronetcy in the Baronetage of England

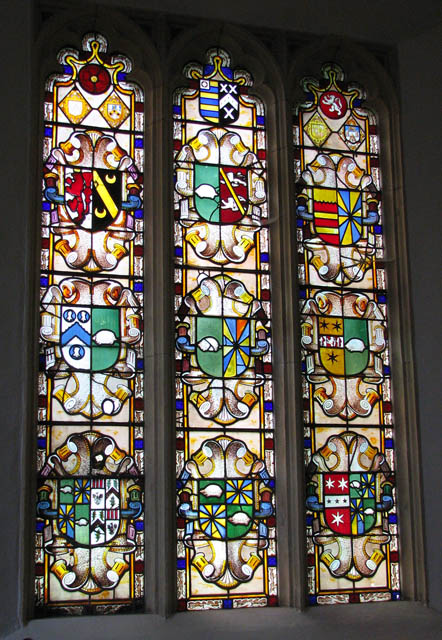
Heraldic stained glass window in the Gawdy Chapel of St Mary's Church, Redenhall, Norfolk. From the demolished Gawdy Hall. Arms of Gawdy: Vert, a tortoise argent

There have been two baronetcies created for members of the Gawdy family, both in the Baronetage of England. Both creations are extinct.

The Gawdy Baronetcy, of Crow's Hall in the County of Suffolk, was created in the Baronetage of England on 20 April 1661 for Charles Gawdy. The title became extinct on the death of the second Baronet in circa 1720.

The Gawdy Baronetcy, of West Harling in the County of Norfolk, was created in the Baronetage of England on 13 July 1663 for William Gawdy, Member of Parliament for Thetford and the first cousin of the first Baronet of the 1661 creation. His son, the second Baronet, gained distinction as a painter despite being deaf. The title became extinct on the death of the latter's son, the third Baronet, in 1724.

The Gawdy family is said to have descended from Sir Brews Gawdey, a French knight who was captured during the Hundred Years' War and naturalised. His descendant Sir Bassingbourne Gawdie was High Sheriff of Norfolk in 1573, 1593 and 1601. Sir Bassingbourne's elder son Framlingham Gawdy was the father of the first Baronet of the 1663 creation while his younger son Sir Charles Gawdy was the father of the first Baronet of the 1661 creation.

== Gawdy baronets, of Crow's Hall (1661) ==
- Sir Charles Gawdy, 1st Baronet (c. 1635–1707)
- Sir Framlingham Gawdy, 2nd Baronet (died c. 1720)

== Gawdy baronets, of West Harling (1663) ==
- Sir William Gawdy, 1st Baronet (1612–1669)
  - Bassingbourne Gawdy (died 1669)
- Sir John Gawdy, 2nd Baronet (4 October 1639 – 1699)
- Sir Bassingbourne Gawdy, 3rd Baronet (died 1723)
