= Sir Charles Gawdy, 1st Baronet =

English Tory politician

Sir Charles Gawdy, 1st Baronet (c. 1635 – September 1707) was an English Tory politician.

== Early life ==
Gawdy was the son of Sir Charles Gawdy and Vere Cooke. He travelled to The Hague in May 1660 with his cousin, William Gawdy, to pledge loyalty to Charles II of England. He was knighted while in the Netherlands. Following the Stuart Restoration, Gawdy was created a baronet, of Crow's Hall in the Baronetage of England on 20 April 1661, in recognition of his loyalty to Charles II. He was appointed a justice of the peace for Suffolk in 1660. In October 1675 he presented the Suffolk petition against the Royal Africa Company.

== Political career ==
In 1678, Gawdy was elected as a Member of Parliament for Eye. He soon emerged as an opponent of the Earl of Shaftesbury, who labelled Gawdy as "vile" and a "papist". During the Exclusion Crisis, Gawdy voted repeatedly against excluding the Duke of York from the throne. In Suffolk, the local magnate, Lord Cornwallis, led moves to oust Gawdy from Parliament, and Gawdy was defeated in the 1679 election. However, Gawdy regained his seat in 1681.

Upon the accession of James II in 1685, Gawdy was returned to parliament as a known loyalist of the king. He was appointed to sixteen committees and helped to draw up the loyal address of the Commons to James II during the Monmouth Rebellion. In September 1688, Jacobite agents reported that Gawdy would probably be elected again in Eye and that he would likely remain loyal to James. After the Glorious Revolution, Gawdy did not stand for re-election and he was removed from the lieutenancy of Suffolk in 1690. His name ceased to appear on the assessment commissions after 1692, when he probably sold his estate.

== Marriage and children ==
On 4 September 1657, Gawdy married Lady Mary Feilding, the second daughter of George Feilding, 1st Earl of Desmond. Together, they had one son and two daughters. Gawdy was succeeded in his title by his only son, Framlingham, who is recorded as "not being of sound mind". The baronetcy became extinct upon the second baronet's death in 1720.

Parliament of England
Preceded by Sir Robert Reeve, Bt; Sir George Reeve, Bt	Member of Parliament for Eye; 1678–1679; With: Sir Robert Reeve, Bt	Succeeded by Charles Fox; George Walsh
Preceded by Charles Fox; George Walsh	Member of Parliament for Eye; 1681–1687; With: Sir Robert Reeve, Bt (1681–1685); Sir John Rous, Bt (1685–1689)	Succeeded by Thomas Knyvett; Henry Poley
Baronetage of England
New creation	Baronet (of Crow's Hall); 1661–1707	Succeeded by Framlingham Gawdy
