= Million Lottery =

First English state lottery

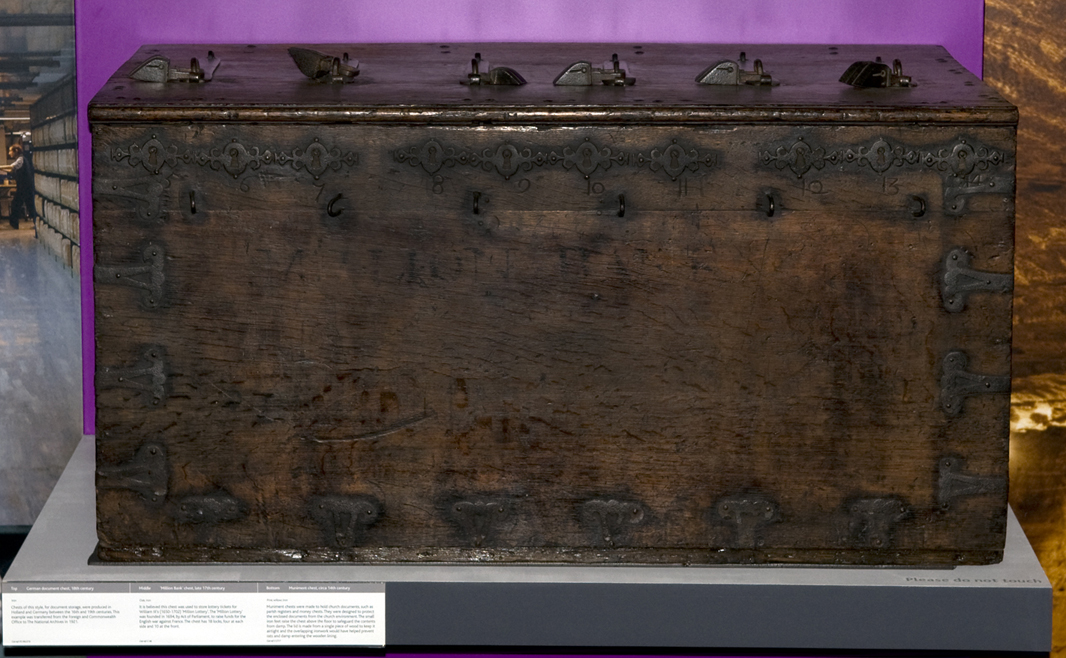
- Million Bank chest, specially designed to hold tickets from the Million Lottery
- Region: England
- Operator: Government of England

The Million Lottery or Million Adventure was the first English state lottery and was launched by the government in 1694.

== Purpose ==
The brainchild of speculator and Master of the Royal Mint Thomas Neale, the lottery was created in order to raise money for the Exchequer. 100,000 £10 tickets were offered for sale as one of a series of measures to raise revenue to allow English participation in the Nine Years' War against France. Other contemporary financial innovations included the granting of a royal charter to the Bank of England and the creation of the country's first national debt. Neale received 10% of the lottery's proceeds.

The 'Bank on Tickets of the Million Adventure' or Million Bank was established in 1695 to manage the assets of subscribers. In 1699 all other lotteries in England were banned but 42 further lotteries were run on the same basis until 1768.

In an ostentatious demonstration of security, tickets for the lottery were kept in special chests with 18 locks. The tickets were also bonds and were redeemable over a 16-year period. In fact, the fund exhibited a shortfall almost immediately and could not keep up with repayments until 1698 when the war was over.

Since each ticket sold at £10, and offered £1 per year for 16 years, plus a lottery reward, its annual interest rate is 10+x%, where x is random. In expectation, x = 1.5. The tickets themselves remained a tradable commodity after the lottery draw (in November 1694), because each ticket still yielded £1 a year for 16 years. The price of a ticket fluctuated around £5-8 during 1694-1701.
