= Humphrey Bennet =

English army officer and politician

Sir Humphrey Bennet JP
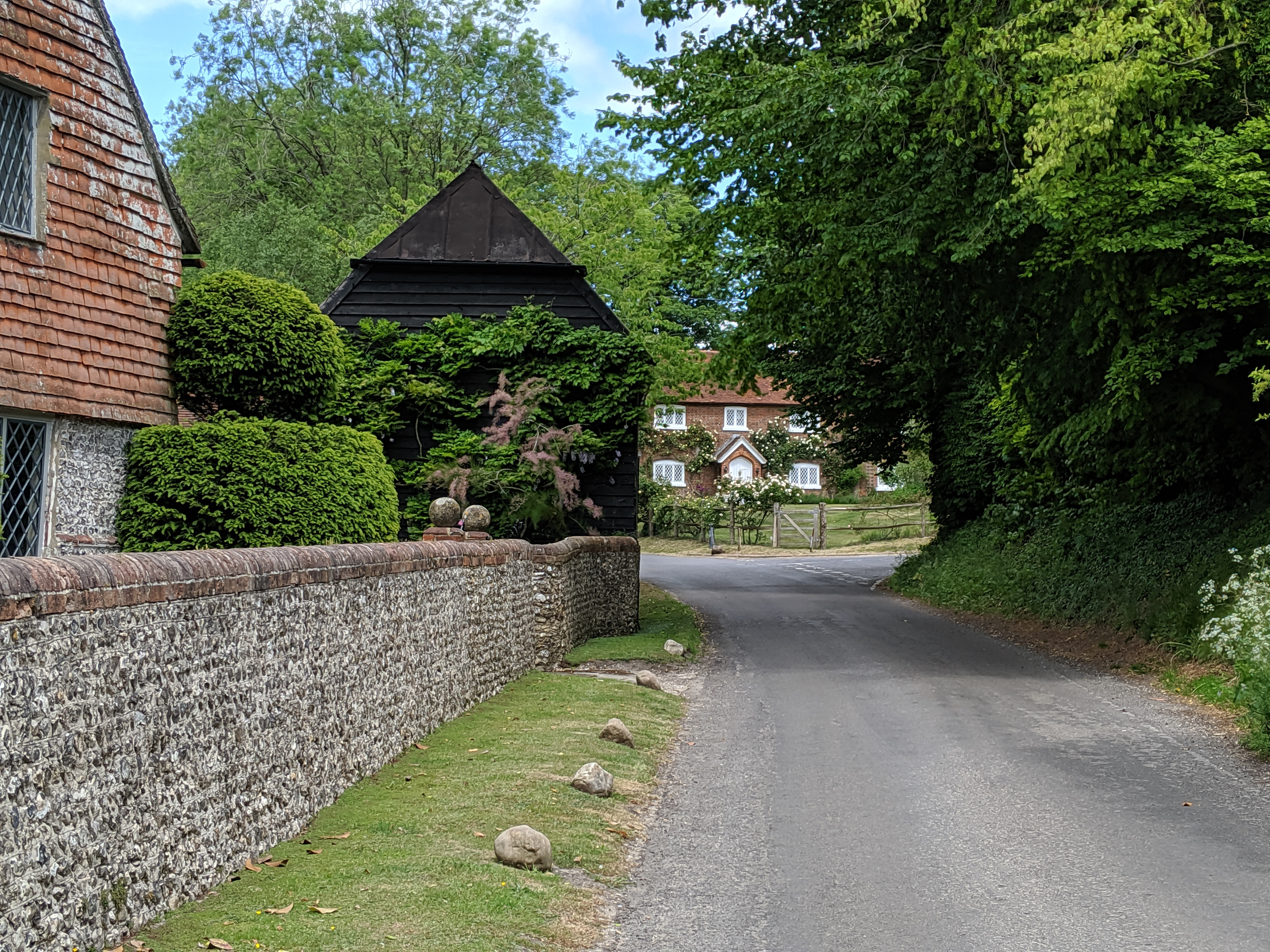
- Shalden village; Bennet purchased the associated manor in 1632, then sold it in 1653

Member of Parliament for Petersfield
- In office August 1660 – December 1667

Royalist High Sheriff of Hampshire
- In office 1643–1645

Personal details
- Born: 1605 (baptised) Mortlake, London
- Died: 30 December 1667 (aged 62) Rotherfield Park, Hampshire
- Spouse(s): Mary Smith (1631–1637); Elizabeth Thomas (?–1660); Elizabeth Norton (1661–his death)
- Children: Thomas (1631/1637–1673); Joanne (1631/1637–1700); Elizabeth (before 1660–1713); Dorothy
- Education: St John's College, Oxford
- Occupation: Landowner and soldier

Military service
- Allegiance: Royalists
- Years of service: 1642–1646
- Rank: Colonel
- Battles/wars: First English Civil War; Battle of Lansdown; Battle of Roundway Down; Storming of Bristol; Battle of Cheriton; Battle of Cropredy Bridge; Battle of Lostwithiel; Second Battle of Newbury; Siege of Basing House; Siege of Winchester Castle

Colonel Sir Humphrey Bennet (1605 – 30 December 1667) was an English army officer and politician who fought for the Royalists in the First English Civil War, in which he rose to the command of a cavalry brigade. He went into exile in 1645, returned home in 1646 and was active in a number of Royalist conspiracies during The Protectorate. After the Stuart Restoration in 1660, he was elected MP for Petersfield and given a position in the Royal Household in 1664.

== Personal details ==
Humphrey Bennet was born around 1605 in Mortlake, third surviving son of Dorothy May (1580-1642) and Thomas Bennet (1565–1620), a wealthy City of London merchant and former Sheriff of London. He had two elder brothers, Richard (1596–1658) and Thomas (1597–1667), as well as at least five sisters; Mary (1602-1648), who was the eldest, married Richard Lewknor (1589-1635), MP for Midhurst. Of the others, Margaret married Chief Justice Henry Rolle (1589–1656), while Rebecca (died 1634), was the first wife of Bulstrode Whitelocke, a senior diplomat under The Protectorate.

Humphrey married three times, first in 1631 to Mary Smith; they had two children before her death in 1637; Thomas, who was killed at the 1672 Battle of Solebay and Joanne (1631/1637–1700). Second was Elizabeth Thomas (?–1660), by whom he had two daughters, Elizabeth (before 1660–1713) and Dorothy; in 1661, he married his third wife Elizabeth Norton, who owned an estate near Rotherfield where he lived until his death.

== First English Civil War 1642 to 1645 ==
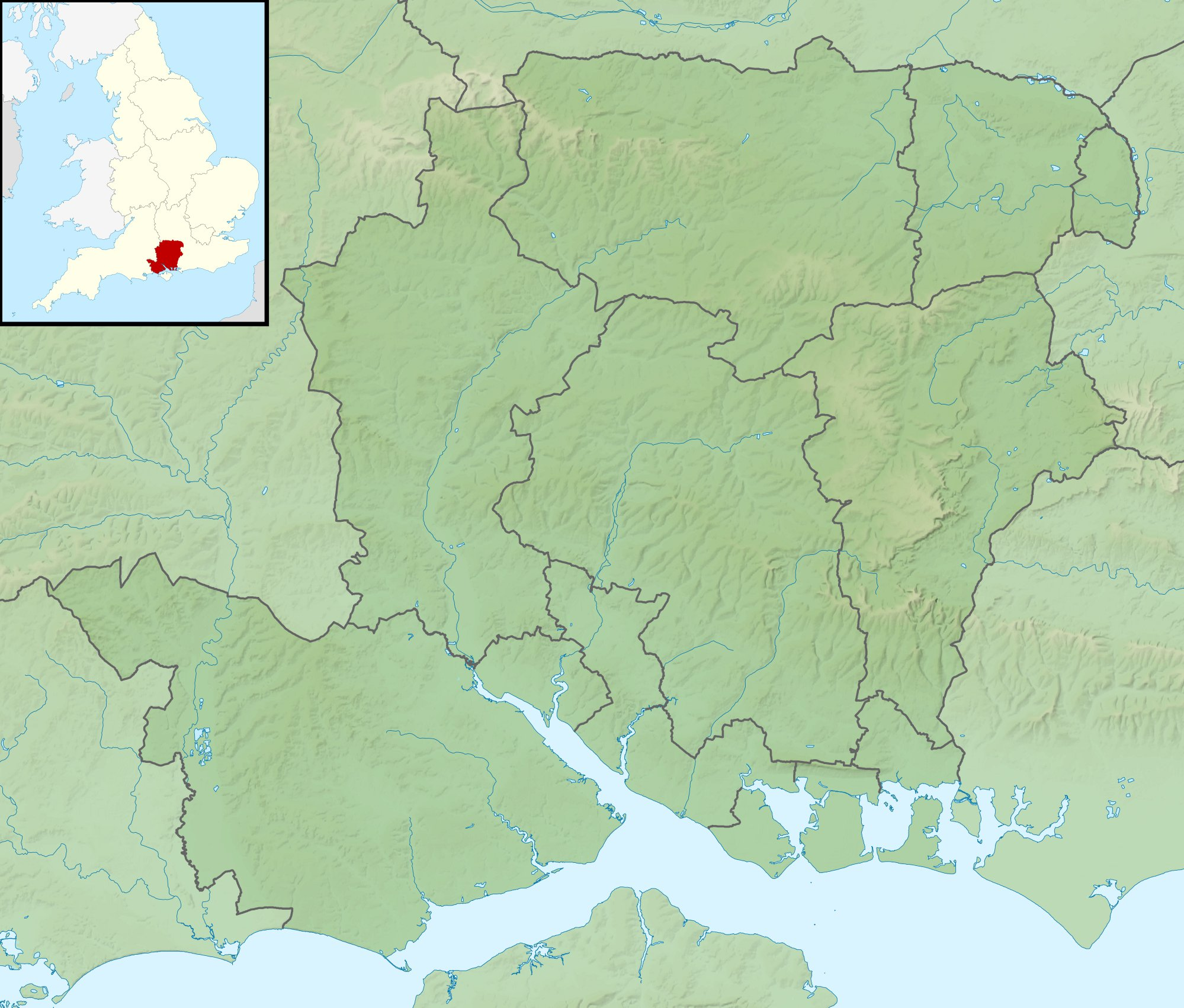
Bennet's Hampshire; key locations

Bennett received legal training at the Inner Temple and graduated from St John's College, Oxford in 1623. When the family properties in London were sold around 1632, Richard and Thomas used their share to purchase lands near Babraham in Cambridgeshire, Humphrey to buy the manor of Shalden, in Hampshire.

When the First English Civil War began in August 1642, he was one of the most active local Royalists and as a result was appointed High Sheriff of Hampshire in 1643. Many of his relatives also supported the king, including his elder brothers and cousin Henry Bennet, 1st Earl of Arlington. Commissioned as a colonel, he raised a regiment of cavalry which served under Sir Ralph Hopton in the 1643 western campaign. He fought at Lansdown, where he was wounded, Roundway Down and the capture of Bristol in August.

These victories provided an opportunity for an offensive against London which would strengthen moderates in Parliament like Denzil Holles who supported a negotiated peace. Bennet was part of the force led by Hopton instructed to march into Hampshire and Sussex; this would threaten London from the south, and close the iron foundries that produced most of Parliament's artillery.

Although the advance was delayed until late October, the Royalists quickly occupied much of Hampshire and Sussex; however, by seeking to hold every town Hopton left his troops isolated and unable to support each other. Appointed governor of Bishop's Waltham, Bennet was also ordered to hold Romsey and on 12 December his regiment was attacked and scattered by a detachment from the Parliamentarian garrison in Southampton. It was reformed in time to fight at the Battle of Cheriton in March 1644, a defeat which "necessitated his Majesty to alter the scheme of his affairs and replace an offensive with defensive war".

Although they retained Winchester, Basing House and parts of Hampshire until late 1645, for the rest of the war the Royalists remained on the defensive in southern England. On 9 April, Bennet surrendered Bishop's Waltham, although he received a free pass to the Royalist capital at Oxford. The remnants of Hopton's force were merged with the Oxford army and Bennet given command of a cavalry brigade during the 1644 western campaign. He took part in the battles of Cropredy Bridge, Lostwithiel and Second Newbury, after which he was knighted.

Bennet then joined the garrison at Basing House, until May 1645 when he and the remaining cavalry were ordered to link up with Lord Goring in Wiltshire. By now the surrounding area was largely controlled by Parliament and they were intercepted while doing so; although his exact movements are unclear, Bennet remained in Hampshire. Defeat at Naseby in June reduced the Royalist presence outside South West England to a few isolated garrisons and on 28 September, a detachment of the New Model Army under Oliver Cromwell besieged Winchester. When its commander William Ogle surrendered on 5 October, Bennet was included on the list of officers given a pass to leave England.

== Interregnum and Restoration ==
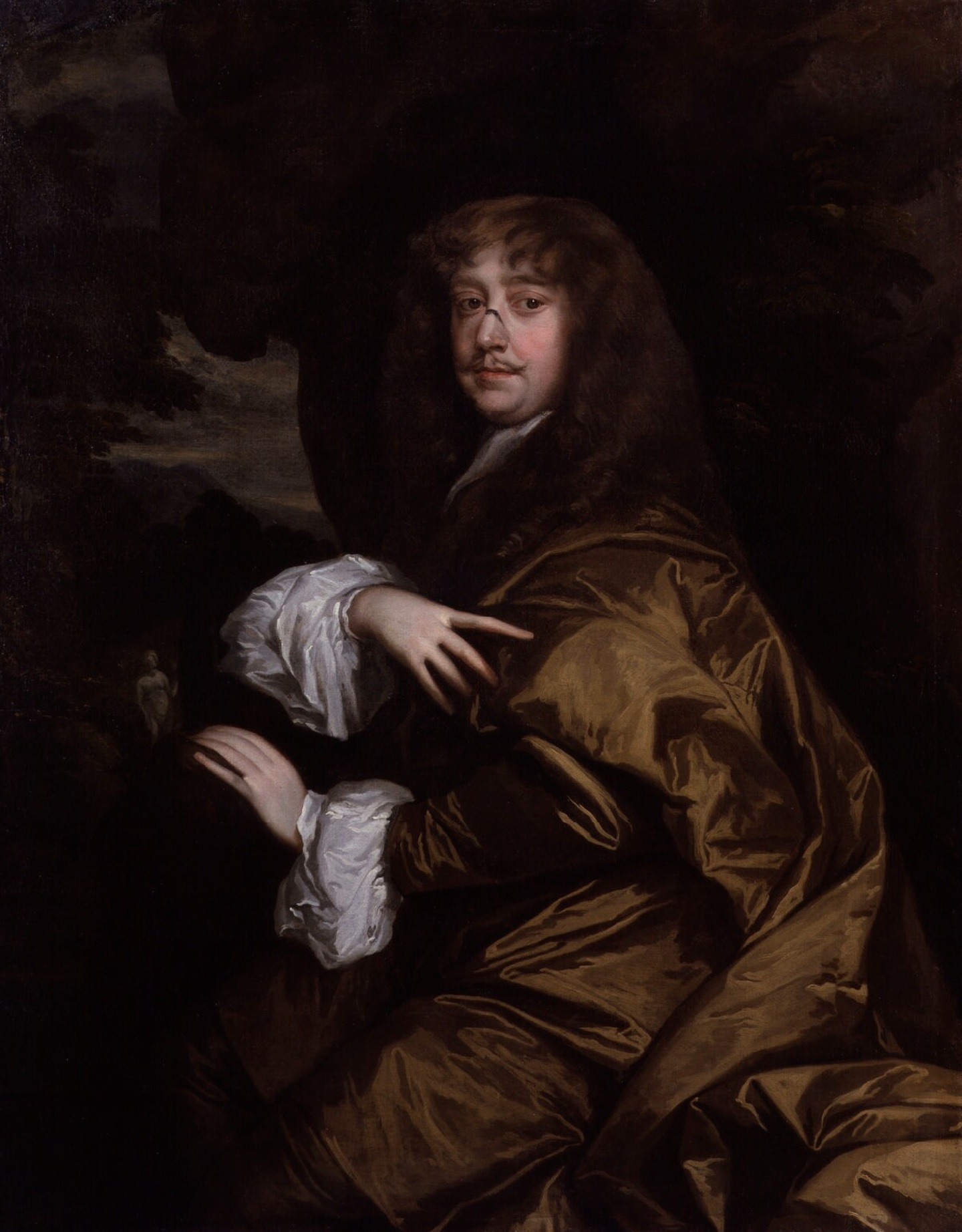
Bennet's cousin; Royalist politician and diplomat Henry Bennet, 1st Earl of Arlington (1618–1685)

Bennet returned home after the First Civil War ended in 1646 and prior to the outbreak of the Second English Civil War in April 1648 helped organise a Royalist rising in the west. The revolt ended before any action was taken and he was fined £890 by the Committee for Compounding with Delinquents in 1649. He continued to engage in Royalist conspiracies during the Interregnum, while Thomas Bennet had his estates confiscated in 1651 for his part in a plot initiated by Eusebius Andrews, executed in August 1650.

In 1653, Bennet was forced to sell Shalden to his nephew John Lewkenor; as one of the ‘Action party’ of Royalist conspirators, he was arrested in 1655 for his role in co-ordinating the failed Penruddock uprising. Held in the Tower of London, he was released in 1658 after agreeing to emigrate to Surinam but was promptly re-arrested for alleged involvement in yet another conspiracy. His connections with Bulstrode Whitelocke and Henry Rolle were probably factors in how such an inveterate plotter escaped execution.

Following the Stuart Restoration in May 1660, Thomas Bennet recovered his estates but Humphrey's petitions for compensation for his losses were largely ignored. Despite his past service, there were too many similar requests for Charles II to fulfil them all, while Bennet reportedly had a comfortable income of £1,000 per year from his third wife. In August 1660, he was elected to the Cavalier Parliament as MP for Petersfield. Although he never held senior office, he sat on various committees and formed part of the Parliamentary faction organised by his cousin Arlington, later one of the so-called Cabal ministry.

He remained entirely dependent on his wife's income and when she became seriously ill in 1664 took the precaution of obtaining a position in the Royal household as protection from his creditors. In the end she outlived him; Bennet died on 30 December 1667.

== Sources ==
- Barratt, John (2004). Cavalier Generals: Charles I and His Commanders during the English Civil War 1642-46. Pen and Sword. ISBN 9781473813038.
- Beaven, Alfred (1908). The Aldermen of the City of London Temp. Henry III - 1912. Corporation of the City of London.
- Davidson, Alan (2010). LEWKNOR, Richard (c.1589-1635), of West Dean, nr. Chichester, Sussex in The History of Parliament: the House of Commons 1604-1629. CUP.
- Ede Borrett, Stephen (1999). "The Royalist Army at the Second Battle of Newbury; 27 October 1644". Journal of the Society for Army Historical Research. 77 (312): 240–249. JSTOR 44225806.
- Godwin, G.N (1882). The Civil War in Hampshire 1642 to 1645. Elliot Stock.
- Helms, MW; Watson, Paula (1983). BENNET, Sir Humphrey (c.1605-67), of Rotherfield Park, East Tisted, Hants in The History of Parliament: the House of Commons 1660-1690. Boydell & Brewer.
- Hibbert, Christopher (1993). Cavaliers and Roundheads; the English at war 1642-1649 (1994 ed.). Harper Collins. ISBN 978-0586090084.
- Judge, Victor. "Sir Humphrey Bennet's Regiment of Horse". BCW.
- Lay, Paul (2020). Providence Lost: The Rise and Fall of Cromwell's Protectorate. Head of Zeus. ISBN 978-1781852569.
- Page, William, ed. (1908). A History of the County of Hampshire: Volume 3. Victoria County History.
- Page, William, ed. (1911). A History of the County of Hampshire: Volume 4. Victoria County History.
- Rosen, Adrienne; Keeling, Susan; Meekings, CPH (1978). A History of the County of Cambridge and the Isle of Ely: Volume 6. Victoria County History.
- Royle, Trevor (2006). Civil War: The Wars of the Three Kingdoms 1638–1660. Abacus. ISBN 978-0-349-11564-1.
- Seaward, Paul (2003). The Cavalier Parliament and the Reconstruction of the Old Regime, 1661-1667. Cambridge University Press. ISBN 978-0521531313.
- Toynbee, Margaret (1963). The Andrew Family of Daventry in Northamptonshire Past and Present, Volume 16 (PDF). Northamptonshire Record Society.
- Underdown, David (1960). Royalist Conspiracy in England, 1649-1660 (1971 ed.). Archon Press. ISBN 978-0208009609.
- Wedgwood, CV (1958). The King's War, 1641-1647 (2001 ed.). Penguin Classics. ISBN 978-0141390727.

Parliament of Great Britain
| Preceded by Thomas Cole | Member of Parliament for Petersfield; 1661–1668; With: Arthur Bold | Succeeded by Thomas Neale |
