= John Gawdy =

English painter

Sir John Gawdy, 2nd Baronet (4 October 1639 –1699) was a Norfolk baronet and portrait miniaturist.

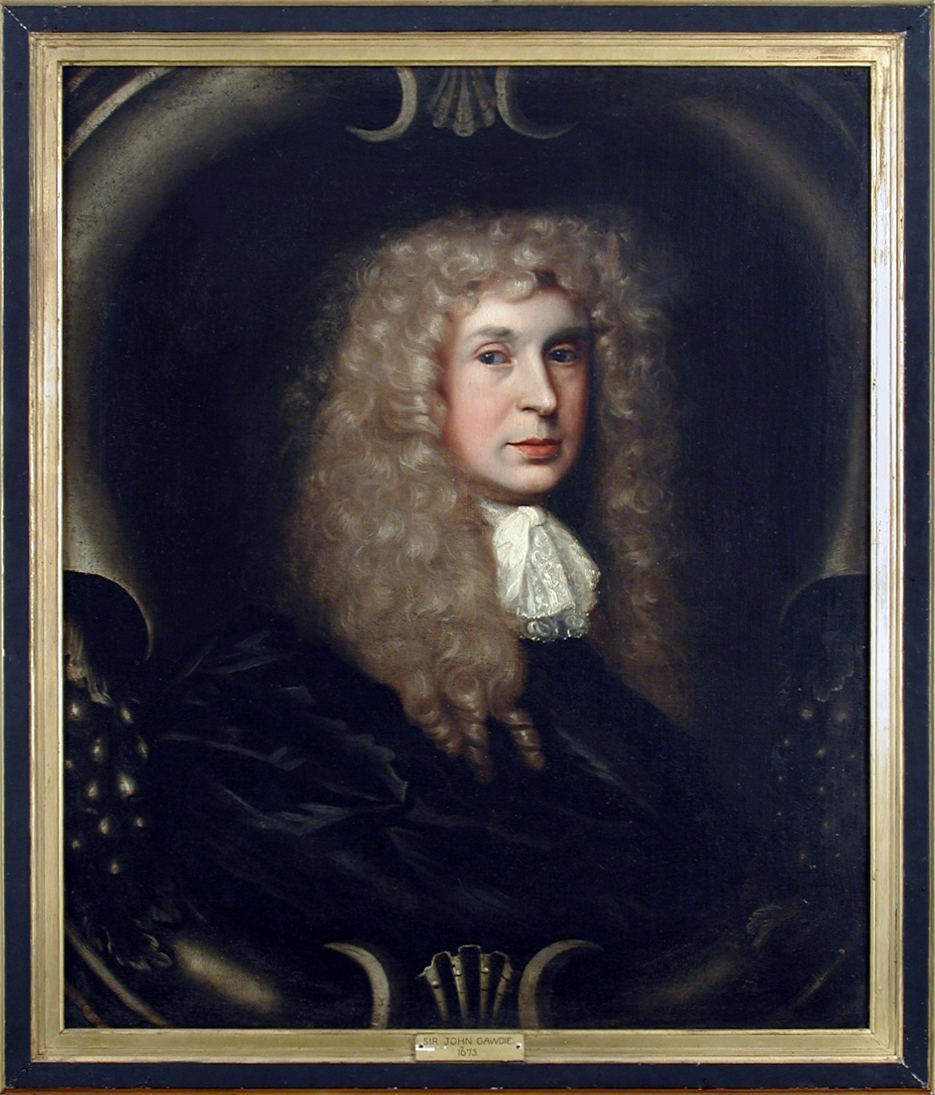
Sir John Gawdy, 2nd Baronet self portrait

John Gawdy was son to Sir William Gawdy (24 September 1612 – 18 August 1669), created 1st Baronet in 1663, of West Harling, Norfolk, and his wife Elizabeth, née Duffield (died 1653), daughter to John Duffield of East Wretham.

Gawdy succeeded to the baronetcy in 1669 upon the death of his father. His elder brother Bassingbourne had died of smallpox in 1660. Gawdy's other siblings were his younger brothers William and Framlingham, and his sister Anne. He married Anne de Grey, the youngest daughter to Sir Robert de Grey (died 1644) of Merton in Norfolk, and his wife Elizabeth, née Bridon (died 1692). Gawdy and Anne produced a son, Bassingbourne, Gawdy's heir, and a daughter, Anne, who married Oliver Le Neve of Witchingham Hall.

There were two other children who died in infancy. Sir Bassingbourne Gawdy became the 3rd Baronet on the death of his father in 1699, but as he died without heir on 10 October 1723, the Gawdy Baronetcy became extinct. The Gawdy estate at West Harling was passed to John Gawdy's nieces, Isabella, Anne and Henrietta, daughters to his sister Anne and Oliver Le Neve. The nieces later sold the estate.

Sir John Gawdy was deaf and mute, as was his brother Framlington. After the Gawdy family moved to Bury St Edmunds following the death of his mother in 1653, he attended the studio of Matthew Snelling, a painter and miniaturist, and later that of Sir Peter Lely, deciding to become a professional portraitist. After he became heir to the Gawdy Baronetcy he painted only for pleasure. He entertained the diarist John Evelyn who described Gawdy as "a very handsome person… and a very fine painter; he was so civil and well bred, as it was not possible to discern any imperfection by him".

Baronetage of England
Preceded by William Gawdy	Baronet (of West Harling); 1669–1699	Succeeded by Bassingbourne Gawdy
