= Henry Bromley (died 1670) =

English politician

Henry Bromley (1632 – 30 September 1670) was an English landowner and politician who sat in the House of Commons in 1660.

== Biography ==
Bromley was the eldest surviving son of Henry Bromley of Holt Castle, Worcestershire and his wife Beatrice Newport, daughter of Richard Newport, 1st Baron Newport of High Ercall and was baptised on 5 March 1632.

He was at Shrewsbury School in 1643, and matriculated at Christ Church, Oxford in 1650. He succeeded to the estates of his father in 1652. In 1653 he was a student of the Inner Temple.

Bromley was a J.P. for Worcestershire from 1654 until his death. He was commissioner for assessment in 1657 and from January 1660 to 1669 and commissioner for militia in March 1660. In April 1660, he was elected Member of Parliament for Worcestershire in the Convention Parliament.

Bromley was commissioner for oyer and terminer for the Oxford circuit from July 1660 and Deputy Lieutenant for Worcestershire from August 1660. He was one of those recommended to become Knight of the Royal Oak, with an income of £1,000 p.a.

In 1661 Bromley was captain of the horse volunteers and in 1662 he was a commissioner for loyal and indigent officers. He died at the age of aged 38, and was buried at Holt.

== Family ==
Bromley married Mercy Pytts, daughter of Edward Pytts MP of Kyre Park, Worcestershire on 16 May 1654. They had two sons (including William Bromley MP) and two daughters. After Bromley's death, Mercy married George Walsh MP.

Parliament of England
Preceded by John Wilde	Member of Parliament for Worcestershire; 1660; With: John Talbot	Succeeded by Sir John Pakington, Bt; Samuel Sandys
