= Sir John Rous, 2nd Baronet =

English Member of Parliament (died 1730)

Sir John Rous, 2nd Baronet (c.1656 – 8 April 1730) of Henham, Suffolk, was an English Tory politician.

Rous was the son of Sir John Rous, 1st Baronet and his second wife, Elizabeth Knyvett. He was educated at St Catharine's College, Cambridge. He was an opponent of the Conventicle Act 1664. In 1670 he succeeded to his father's baronetcy. Rous was appointed a Deputy Lieutenant of Suffolk in 1676, High Sheriff of Suffolk in 1678 and in 1680 he was the colonel of the county militia troop of horse. Between 1680 and 1688 he was a justice of the peace for Suffolk.

In 1685, Rous was elected as a Tory Member of Parliament for Eye. He was removed from the lieutenancy and peace commission of Suffolk in 1688 for opposing James II of England's religious policies. Despite this, he voted that James had not vacated the throne during the Glorious Revolution. In 1689 he was returned as a member for Suffolk and reappointed as a justice of the peace, but he was not re-elected at the 1690 election. Rous was suspected of being a Jacobite and was removed as a magistrate in 1694. In 1721, Rous' name was sent to James Francis Edward Stuart as being a likely supporter of the Jacobite cause. He died in 1730.

Parliament of England
Preceded by Sir Charles Gawdy, Bt; Sir Robert Reeve, Bt	Member of Parliament for Eye; 1685–1687; With: Sir Charles Gawdy, Bt	Succeeded by Thomas Knyvett; Henry Poley
Preceded by Sir Robert Broke, Bt; Sir Henry North, Bt	Member of Parliament for Suffolk; 1689–1690; With: Sir John Cordell, Bt	Succeeded by Sir Gervase Elwes, Bt; Sir Samuel Barnardiston, Bt
Baronetage of England
Preceded by John Rous	Baronet (of Henham); 1670–1730	Succeeded by John Rous
