= Reeve baronets =

Extinct baronetcy in the Baronetage of England

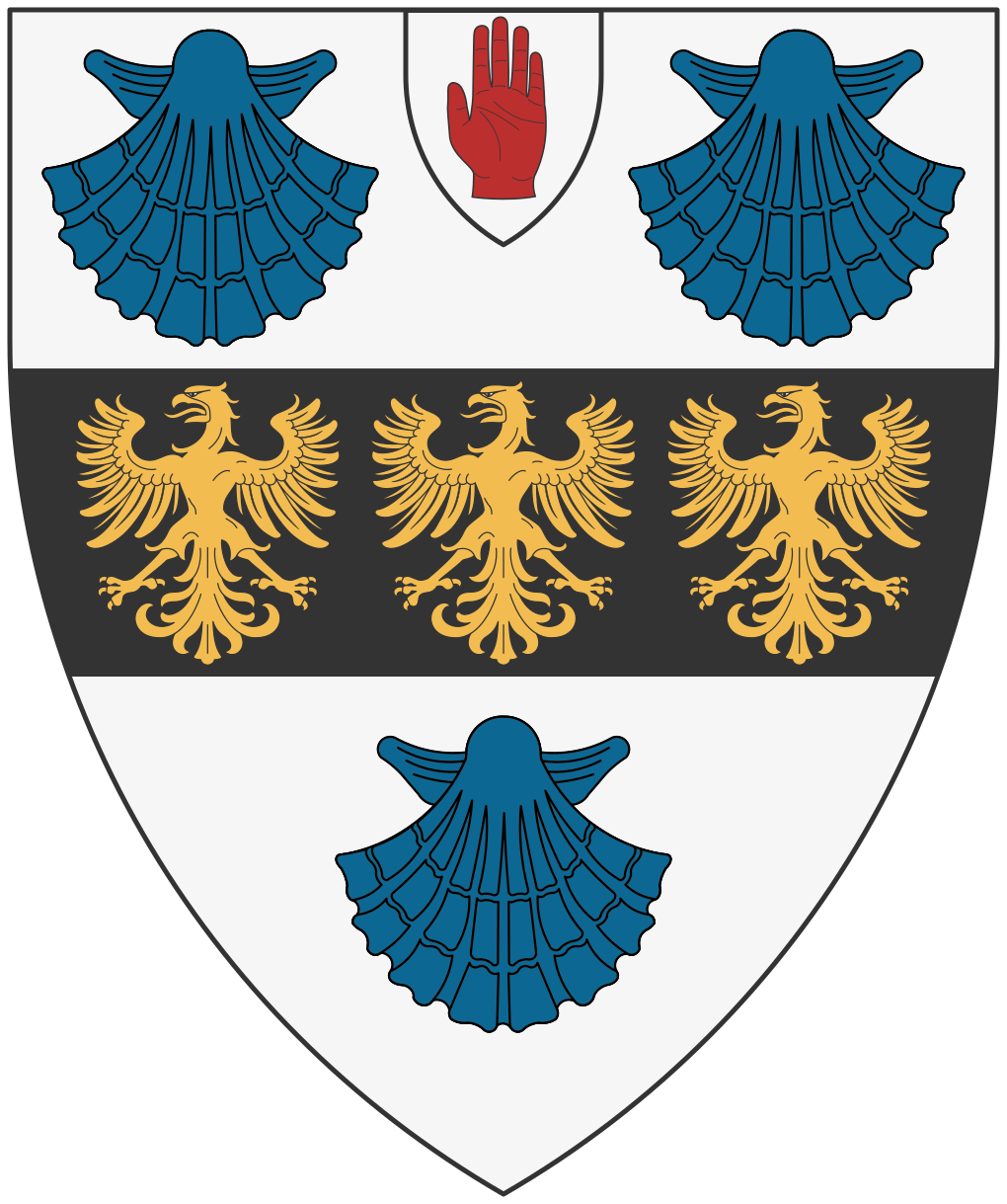
The coat of arms of the Reeve baronets.

The Reeve Baronetcy, of Thwaite in the County of Suffolk, was a title in the Baronetage of England. It was created on 22 January 1663 for George Reeve, Member of Parliament for Eye. The second Baronet also represented this constituency in the House of Commons. The title became extinct on his death in 1688.

== Reeve baronets, of Thwaite (1663) ==
- Sir George Reeve, 1st Baronet (c. 1618–c. 1678)
- Sir Robert Reeve, 2nd Baronet (1652–1688)
