= George Walsh (MP for Eye) =

17th-century English politician

George Walsh (c. 1621 – 12 November 1692) was an English politician, who served as MP for Eye 1680–1681.

Walsh was the third son of William Walsh of Abberley, Worcestershire, and his wife Elizabeth Blount, daughter of Sir George Blount of Sodington, Worcestershire.

He fought for the King in the Civil War, and was appointed a Gentleman of the Privy Chamber in June 1660. He served as a JP in Middlesex 1665–76, and became a freeman of Eye in 1674, his wife having taken a lease for him of the manor at Eye Priory.

He unsuccessfully contested a by-election at Eye in November 1675. In 1676 he was removed as a JP for "abetting an offender and going off the bench".

In the second election of 1679 there was a double return at Eye: the senior bailiff declared the incumbents Gawdy and Reeve elected, while the junior bailiff sealed an indenture for Charles Fox and Walsh, both standing in the interest of Lord Cornwallis. Fox and Walsh were declared elected by the House of Commons on 8 December 1680. In 1681 Walsh (now partnered by Sir John Duncombe) was defeated by Gawdy and Reeve. Walsh and Duncombe petitioned, but their petition was not heard before the parliament was dissolved.

A warrant was issued for a baronetcy for Walsh in 1681, but it never passed the seals.

Walsh was a strong supporter of the regime of William and Mary after the Glorious Revolution.

He died on 12 November 1692, and was buried at Abberley.

== Family ==
Walsh married twice:

1. Anne, daughter of John Collins and widow of Robert Vallence, innkeeper of Clerkenwell, married c. 1659. Anne died on 10 May 1679.
2. Mercy, daughter of Edward Pytts MP and widow of Henry Bromley MP, married on 23 September 1679.

He had no children by either marriage.

Walsh's nephew was William Walsh MP.

Parliament of England
Preceded by Sir Robert Reeve; Sir Charles Gawdy	Member of Parliament for Eye; 1680–1681; With: Charles Fox	Succeeded by Sir Robert Reeve; Sir Charles Gawdy
