= Charles Fox (politician, born 1660) =

English politician (1660–1713)

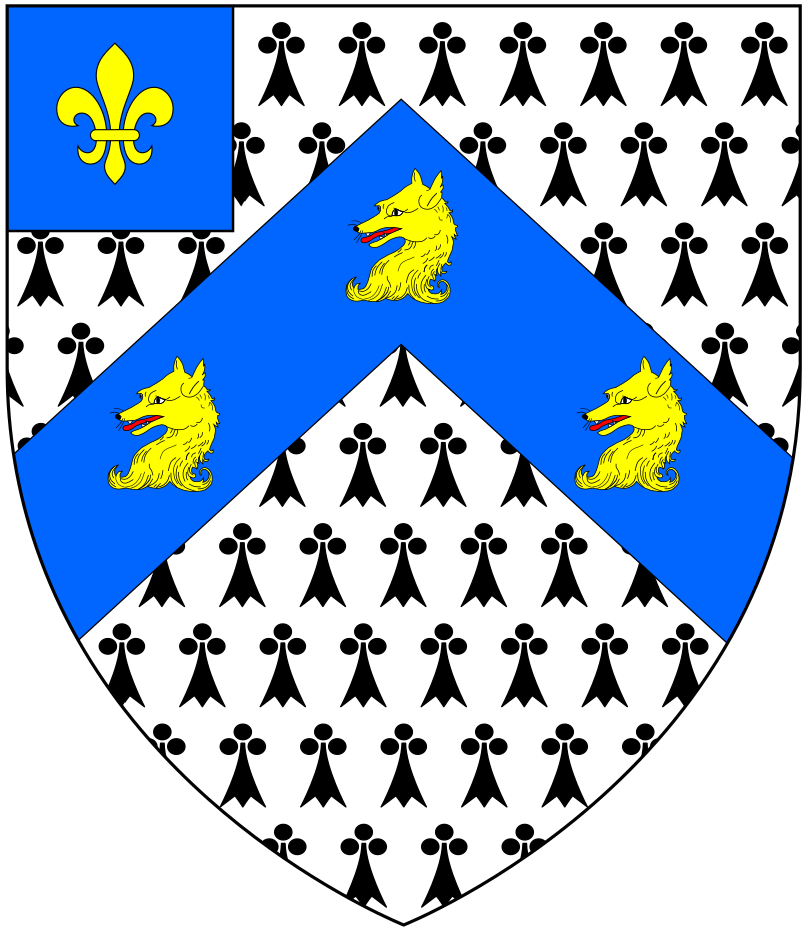
Canting arms of Fox: Ermine, on a chevron azure three fox's heads and necks erased or on a canton of the second a fleur-de-lys of the third

Charles Fox (2 January 1660 – 21 September 1713), of Chiswick, Middlesex. and Farley, Wiltshire, was an English Tory politician who sat in the English and British House of Commons between 1680 and 1713. He was Paymaster of the Forces (a lucrative post formerly occupied by his father) to Kings James II, William III and to Queen Anne.

== Biography ==
Fox was born at Brussels just before the Restoration. He was the third son of Sir Stephen Fox, and was named after Charles II, who acted as his godfather. He was naturalised in 1670. Both his elder brothers were then dead, and in 1676 he was sent on a tour of the Continent under the charge of Dr. Younger, later Dean of Salisbury. On his return he was married in 1679 to Elizabeth, daughter and co-heiress of Sir William Trollope, 2nd Baronet; they had no children.

The Water Eaton estate, near Cricklade, was settled on him on this occasion, and he probably first stood for the borough at the first general election of 1679. He was not successful, and in the autumn he contested Eye on the interest of his brother-in-law, Lord Cornwallis. After a double return had been decided in his favour, he took his seat in the second Exclusion Parliament, still under age. He left no trace on its proceedings, but probably voted with the Court. It was rumoured that he would contest Downton in 1681, but nothing came of it. In 1681, he sold off some of his landholdings, including land in Acton, west London. He was given the lucrative office of paymaster-general in 1682 under the supervision of his father; but he was corpulent and easy-going, and never achieved eminence in either administration or politics.

Fox stood again for Cricklade in 1685, and was seated on the merits of the return. Apart from one short break in 1701, he represented this borough or Salisbury for the rest of his life. ‘His modesty made him backward in attempting set speeches’, but as a committeeman he was moderately active in James II's Parliament, with seven committees, including those to examine the disbandment accounts, to estimate the yield of a tax on new buildings, and to reform the bankruptcy law. He was much disturbed by the employment of Roman Catholic officers in the army, and was advised by his friends to absent himself from Parliament in order not to displease the King by voting to discuss grievances before supply.

But, the day being come on which the question was to be put, he found such a concern growing upon him for the cause of the Church ... that, moved by the impulse of his conscience, he could not be easy till he went to the Speaker's chamber. His coming thither occasioned his friends to be again importunate with him to withdraw himself. ... But hearing the debates arising in the House, he could no longer contain himself, but went into it, even after the question was put (a thing that was unusual, but then allowed), and carried it ... by his single vote; for which he was reprimanded by King James, and dismissed from his valuable employments.

The paymastership, which some valued at £9,000 p.a., though his father reckoned the net annual income at £3,164, was given to Lord Ranelagh (Richard Jones). But Fox was allowed to kiss the King's hand in the following January, and in 1688 the royal electoral agents, who correctly expected him to be re-elected, hoped that he might ‘go right’ on James's ecclesiastical policy.

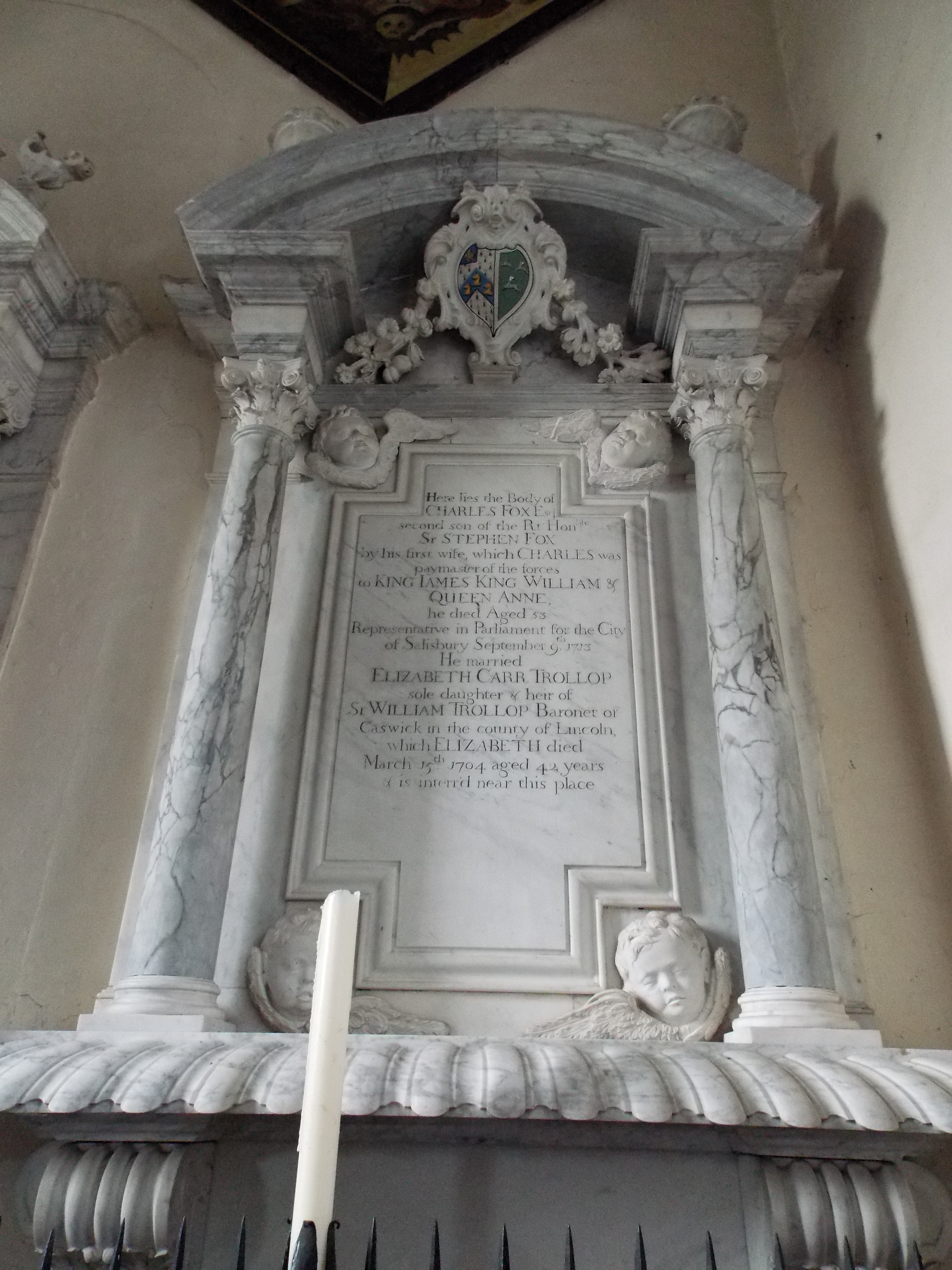
Mural monument to Charles Fox in the Ilchester Chapel of All Saints' Church, Farley, Wiltshire

In the Convention Fox voted to agree with the Lords that the throne was not vacant, and he was again moderately active. He was appointed to 17 committees, acted as teller in four divisions, and made two recorded speeches. On 14 June 1689 he strongly denied the old charge that his father had offered bribes from the secret service fund to Members of the Cavalier Parliament. When the naval victuallers were ordered into custody on 23 November he came forward as security for Sir Richard Haddock, and on 5 December he was teller for the successful motion for their release on bail. A member of the committee on the bill for restoring corporations, he acted as teller for disabling James II's regulators when the measure reached the floor of the House.

A high-church Tory, Fox was far more of a party man than his father, though he regularly voted for supply under William III and Anne. He was dismissed in 1696 for voting against the attainder of Sir John Fenwick and again under Anne for voting for the Tack. He died at Chiswick in his father's lifetime on 21 September 1713, considerably indebted, and was buried at Farley.

Parliament of England
Preceded by Sir Robert Reeve; Sir Charles Gawdy	Member of Parliament for Eye; 1680–1681; With: George Walsh	Succeeded by Sir Charles Gawdy; Sir Robert Reeve
Preceded by William Lenthall; Edmund Webb	Member of Parliament for Cricklade; 1685–1698; With: Edmund Webb 1681-1689, 1690-1698; Thomas Freke 1689-1698; Edward Pleydell 1698	Succeeded by Sir Stephen Fox; Edward Pleydell
Preceded by Thomas Hoby; Sir Thomas Mompesson	Member of Parliament for Salisbury; 1698–1700; With: Robert Eyre	Succeeded by Sir Thomas Mompesson; Robert Eyre
Preceded by Sir Thomas Mompesson; Robert Eyre	Member of Parliament for Salisbury; 1701–1707; With: Robert Eyre	Succeeded by Parliament of Great Britain
Parliament of Great Britain
Preceded by Parliament of England	Member of Parliament for Salisbury; 1707–1713; With: Robert Eyre 1707-1710; Robert Pitt 1710-1713; Richard Jones 1713	Succeeded by Sir Stephen Fox; Richard Jones
