= Thomas Neale =

English project-manager and politician

- Born: 1641
- Died: 1699 (aged 57–58)
- Occupations: Project-manager and politician

Thomas Neale (1641–1699) was an English project-manager and politician who was also the first person to hold a position equivalent to postmaster-general of the North American colonies.

Neale was a Member of Parliament for thirty years, Master of the Mint and the Transfer Office, Groom of the Bedchamber, gambler, and entrepreneur. His wide variety of projects included the development of Seven Dials, Shadwell, East Smithfield, and Tunbridge Wells, land-drainage projects, steel foundries and paper-making enterprises, mining in Maryland and Virginia, raising shipwrecks, and developing a pair of dice to prevent cheating at gaming. He was also the author of numerous tracts on coinage and fund-raising, and he was involved in the idea of a National Land Bank, the precursor of the Bank of England.

== Biography ==
He was the only son of Thomas Neale of Warnford, Hampshire by Lucy, the daughter of Sir William Uvedale of Wickham, Hampshire and educated at Clare College, Cambridge.

Neale was one of the most influential figures of late-Stuart England, and one of the least-chronicled. He used his many contacts, garnered through family, the royal court, and county connections, to act as middle-man between men of money, the court, fellow members of Parliament, the general public, and other parties, public and private. He was elected a Fellow of the Royal Society in 1664.

He was appointed High Sheriff of Hampshire for 1665–66 and served in 1677 as a commissioner on an inquiry into the Royal Mint. He was a Commissioner of the Mint from 1684 to 1686 and Master of the Mint from 1686 to the date of his death, when he was succeeded by Sir Isaac Newton.

In February 1678, he was appointed Groom Porter to Charles II, a post which he also held under James II and William III. His duties in that capacity were to see the King's lodgings furnished with tables, chairs, and fireplace materials, to provide cards and dice, and to decide disputes at the card-table and on the bowling-green. He was authorised by the King to license and suppress gaming-houses, and to prosecute unlicensed keepers of "rafflings" and other public games. On his own account, he originated a loan and lottery business on the Venetian system. In 1694 Neale established the Million Lottery to generate revenue for the government (and himself). The project was successful in selling tickets but did not result in a return for the Exchequer. From 1679 to 1685 he was a Groom of the Bedchamber to the King.

From 1688, Neale developed his interests as a member of Parliament, and was successively MP for Petersfield(1668), Ludgershall (1679–89), Stockbridge (1689–90) and again for Ludgershall (1690–99), sitting on sixty-two committees.

As an entrepreneur and speculator, he promoted building schemes, among which were Lower Shadwell and the converging streets of Seven Dials - one of them, Neal Street, Long Acre (street), still bears his name. Neal's Yard in Covent Garden is also named after him.

He was named Deputy Governor in the charter (dated 1692) of the Company for Digging and Working Mines, and was involved in ventures to recover treasure from wrecks off Broad Haven, Ireland, in the Bermudas, and in the region from Cartagena to Jamaica. All of these were floated as joint-stock companies.

== In America ==
Throughout the early years of the North American colonies, many attempts were made to initiate a postal service. These early attempts were of small scale and usually involved a colony, Massachusetts Bay Colony for example, setting up a location in Boston where one could post a letter back home to England. Other attempts focused on a dedicated postal service between two of the larger colonies, such as Massachusetts and Virginia, but the available services remained limited in scope and disjointed for many years.

Central postal organization first came to the colonies in 1691 when Thomas Neale received a 21-year grant from the British Crown for a North American Postal Service. On 17 February 1691, a grant of letters patent from the joint sovereigns, William III and Mary II, empowered Thomas Neale,

"to erect, settle, and establish within the chief parts of their majesties' colonies and plantations in America, an office or offices for receiving and dispatching letters and pacquets, and to receive, send, and deliver the same under such rates and sums of money as the planters shall agree to give, and to hold and enjoy the same for the term of twenty-one years."

Rates of postage were accordingly fixed and authorized, and measures were taken to establish a post office in each town in Virginia. Massachusetts and the other colonies soon passed postal laws, and a very imperfect post office system was established. Neale's patent expired in 1710, when Parliament extended the English postal system to the colonies. The chief office was established in New York City, where letters were conveyed by regular packets across the Atlantic.

- 1691: Thomas Neale received a 'postal patent' (concession to deliver the mail) for the American and West Indies; Neale appointed Andrew Hamilton, Governor of New Jersey, as his deputy postmaster.
- 1693: On 1 May, Hamilton started weekly service between Portsmouth, New Hampshire and Virginia. Campbell, Duncan, and John organized the first postal network in America.
- 1698: Neale dropped Hamilton; Hamilton had revenue of less than two thousand dollars and expenses totaling approximately five thousand dollars for his period in office.

Neale's franchise cost him only eighty cents a year, but it was no bargain; he died heavily in debt, in 1699 in Wiltshire.

== Private life ==
In 1664, he was married to Elizabeth, the daughter of Sir John Garrard, 2nd Baronet, of Lamer Park, Wheathampstead, Hertfordshire, and the widow of Sir Nicholas Gould, 1st Baronet, of London, with whom he had one son. Elizabeth was England's richest widow, and he became known as 'Golden Neal'. Nonetheless, this remarkable man died insolvent in 1699 after a varied career, during which he exhausted two fortunes, doubtless through gaming and ill-founded speculations. He was succeeded by his son, who died soon after him.

== Publications ==
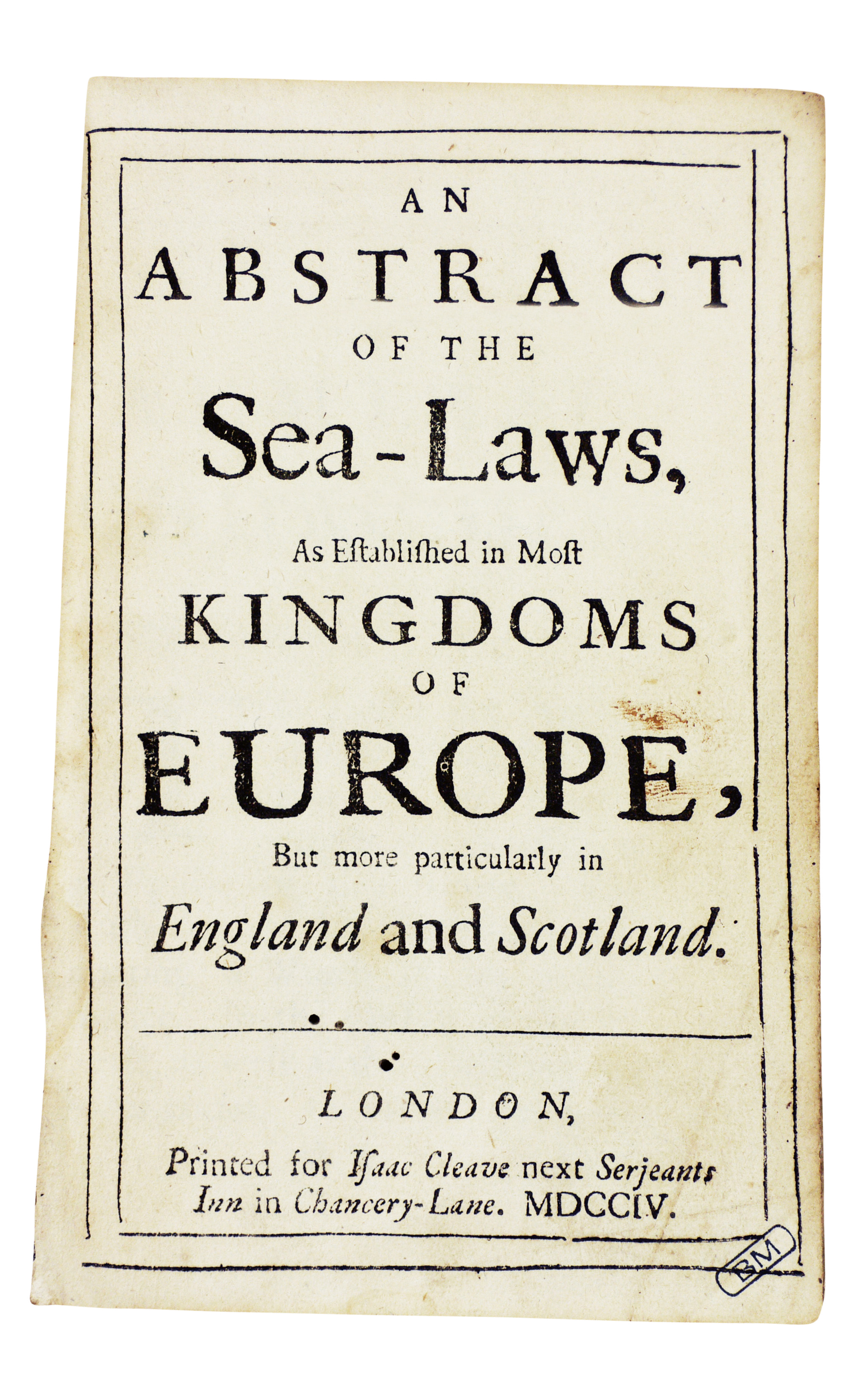
An abstract of the sea-laws, 1704.

- A Proposal for Amending the Silver Coins of England (1696)

== See also ==
- United States Postal Service

Parliament of England
Preceded by Sir Humphrey Bennet; Arthur Bold	Member of Parliament for Petersfield; 1668–1679; With: Arthur Bold 1668–1677; Leonard Bilson 1677–1679	Succeeded by Sir John Norton; Leonard Bilson
Preceded by William Ashburnham; George Legge	Member of Parliament for Ludgershall; 1679–1689; With: John Smith 1679; John Garrard 1679–1681; Sir John Talbot 1681–1685; Henry Clerke 1685–1689	Succeeded by John Smith; John Deane
Preceded by William Montagu; Richard Whithed	Member of Parliament for Stockbridge; 1689–1690; With: Richard Whithed	Succeeded by William Montagu; Richard Whithed
Preceded by John Smith; John Deane	Member of Parliament for Ludgershall; 1690–1699; With: John Deane 1690–1695; John Richmond Webb 1695–1698; Walter Kent 1698–1699	Succeeded by John Richmond Webb; Walter Kent
Government offices
Preceded by In Commission	Master of the Mint; 1686–1699	Succeeded by Sir Isaac Newton
Court offices
Preceded by Thomas Offley	Groom Porter; 1678–1699	Succeeded by William Rowley
