= Sir Robert Reeve, 2nd Baronet =

Sir Robert Reeve, 2nd Baronet (29 June 1652 – 19 August 1688) was an English politician.

Reeve was the son of Sir George Reeve, 1st Baronet. In 1675, he was elected as a Member of Parliament for Eye. He was appointed to five parliamentary committees during the Cavalier Parliament. During the Exclusion Crisis, he voted consistently against excluding James, Duke of York from the throne. In October 1678 he succeeded to his father's baronetcy. Reeve lost his seat in 1679, but regained it in 1681. He left no trace on the records of the Oxford Parliament and did not stand for re-election in 1685. He died in 1688, at which point his title became extinct.

Parliament of England
Preceded by Charles Cornwallis; Sir George Reeve, Bt	Member of Parliament for Eye; 1675–1679; With: Sir George Reeve, Bt (1675–1678); Sir Charles Gawdy, Bt (1678–1679)	Succeeded by Charles Fox; George Walsh
Preceded by Charles Fox; George Walsh	Member of Parliament for Eye; 1681; With: Sir Charles Gawdy, Bt	Succeeded by Sir Charles Gawdy, Bt; Sir John Rous, Bt
Baronetage of England
Preceded by George Reeve	Baronet (of Thwaite); 1678–1688	Extinct
