= John Man (MP for Montgomery) =

English politician (died 1569)

John Man of Bolingbroke and Sutton St. James, Lincolnshire (died June 1569) was an English politician. He sat as MP for Montgomery in 1559.

He also served as justice of the peace for Lincolnshire in 1559; feodary of the Duchy of Lancaster in Lincolnshire from 1559; and deputy receiver of the honour of Bolingbroke in 1560.

He was the son of John Man of Bolingbroke by Margaret, the daughter of William Dobbyn of Gedney. He married Audrey, the daughter of Richard Ogle of Pinchbeck and they had two sons and two daughters.
