= Sir John Rous, 1st Baronet =

English Member of Parliament for Dunwich

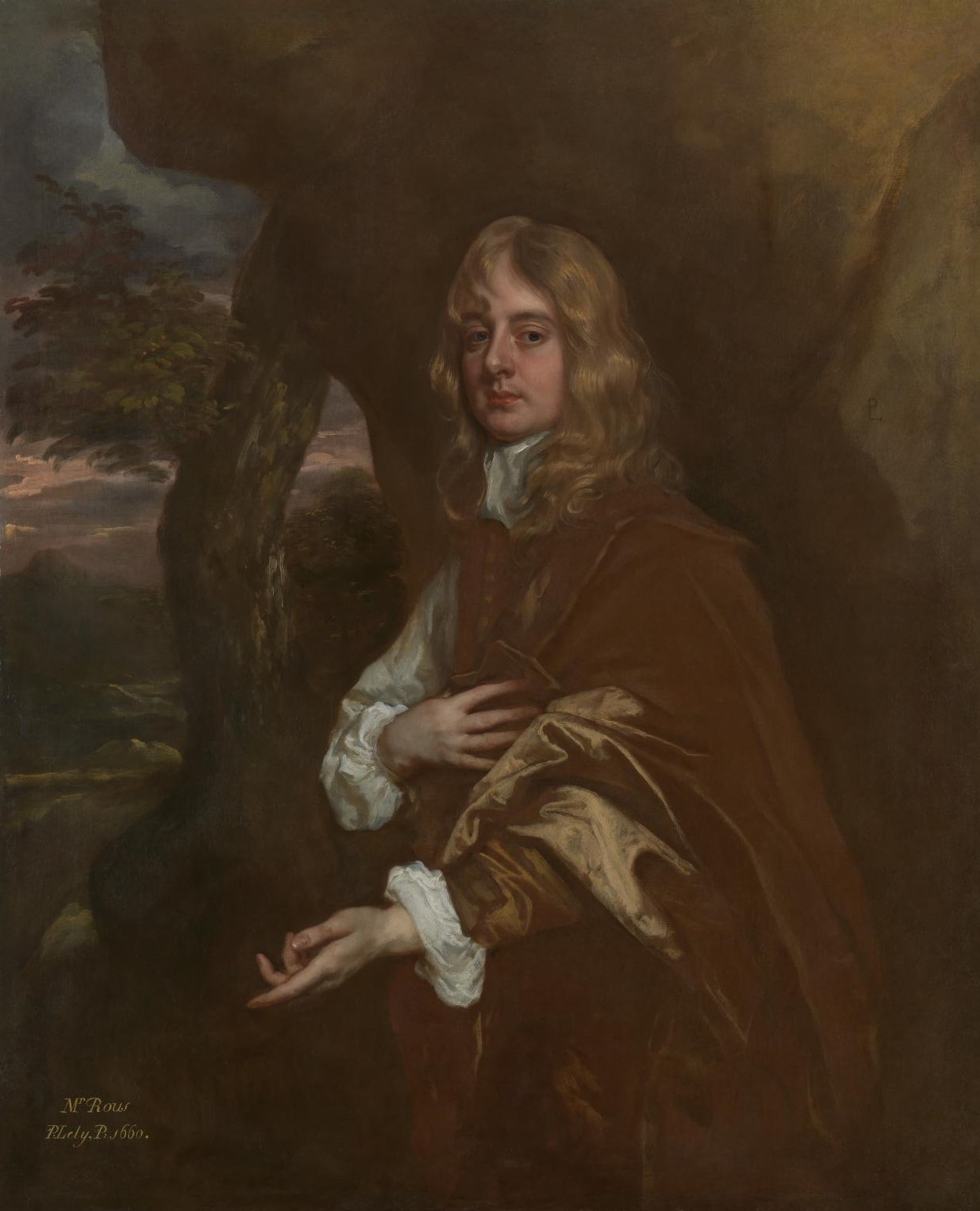
- A portrait of Sir John Rous, Bt by Peter Lely

Member of Parliament for Dunwich
- In office 1660–1670
- Monarch: Charles II

Personal details
- Born: c.1608
- Died: 27 November 1670
- Parent(s): Sir John Rous; Elizabeth Yelverton

Sir John Rous, 1st Baronet (c. 1608 – 27 November 1670) was an English politician who sat in the House of Commons from 1660 to 1670.

== Biography ==
Rous was the son of Sir John Rous of Henham Hall and his wife Elizabeth Yelverton, daughter of Sir Christopher Yelverton, Lord Chief Justice. He was admitted to Pembroke College, Cambridge on 10 October 1623 and graduated in 1626. The following year he was admitted to Gray's Inn. Rous' father was a supporter of Parliament during the English Civil War, whereas Rous was a Royalist. He lived quietly during the Commonwealth of England but was in correspondence with the exiled Stuart court; on 27 April 1660, Charles II wrote to him from Breda to express appreciation of his loyalty.

In 1660, Rous was elected Member of Parliament for Dunwich in the Convention Parliament. He was created a baronet, of Henham, Suffolk in the Baronetage of England on 17 August 1660, in reward for his loyalty to the king. In 1661 he was re-elected MP for Dunwich in the Cavalier Parliament, of which he was a moderately active member, and sat until his death in 1670. He was appointed to 75 committees and aligned himself with the Court faction. His activity in the Commons declined after 1664 and on 15 December 1666 he was summoned to parliament to answer for his prolonged non-attendance. He commanded a regiment of the Suffolk Militia during the Second Dutch War.

Rous married firstly Anne Bacon, daughter of Nicholas Bacon of Gillingham. He married secondly Elizabeth Knyvett, daughter of Thomas Knyvett of Ashwell Thorpe, Norfolk and by her had a son, John, and two daughters.

He died on 27 November 1670 and was buried at Wangford.

Parliament of England
Preceded by Robert Brewster; John Barrington	Member of Parliament for Dunwich; 1660–1670; With: Henry Bedingfield (1660); Richard Coke (1661–1670); John Pettus (1670)	Succeeded by William Wood; John Pettus
Baronetage of England
New creation	Baronet (of Henham); 1660–1670	Succeeded by John Rous
