= William Swanton =

William Swanton (c.1630 - 18 July 1681) was an MP in the Cavalier Parliament of England, elected to represent Salisbury on 14 February 1673.
