= 1661 English general election =

General election in England

- 1661
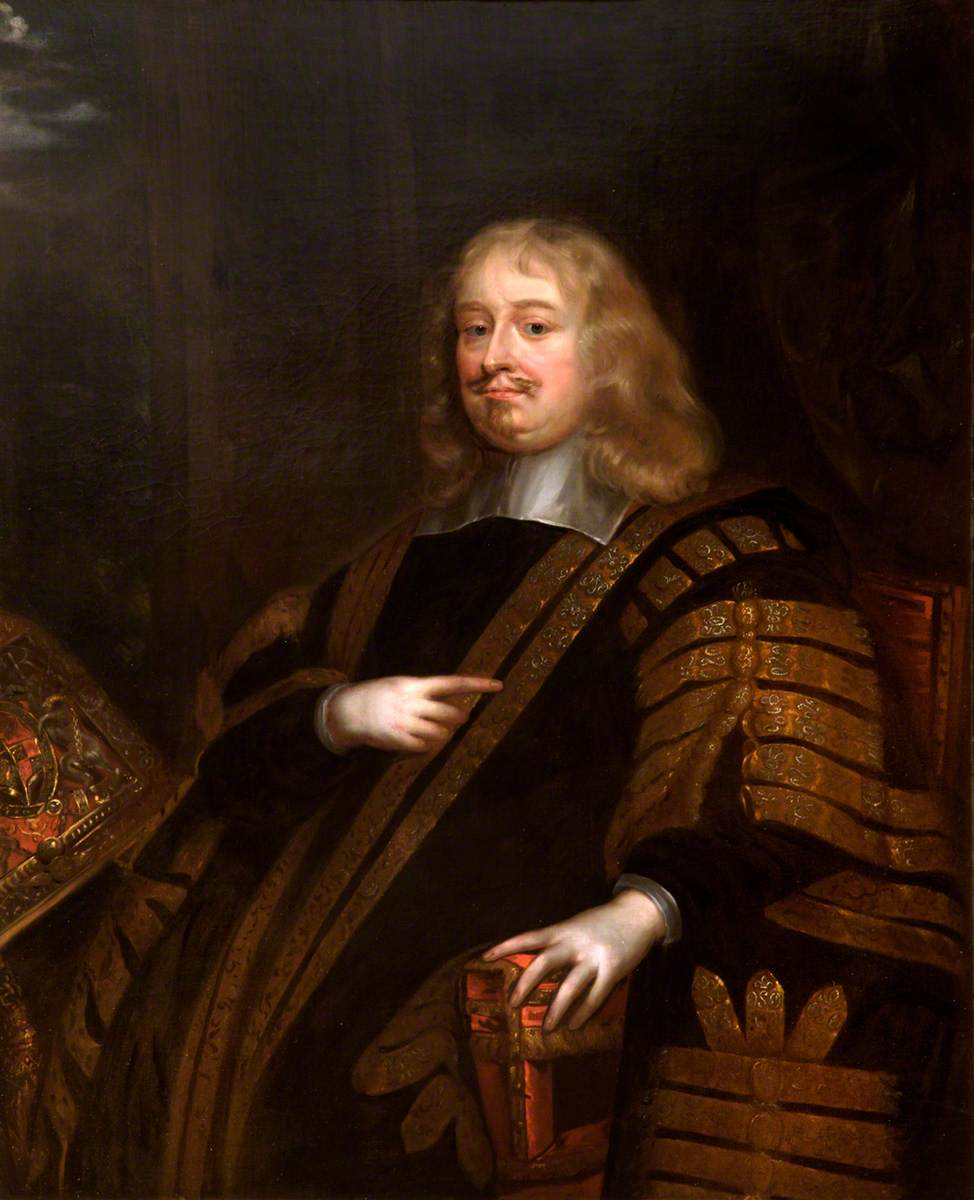

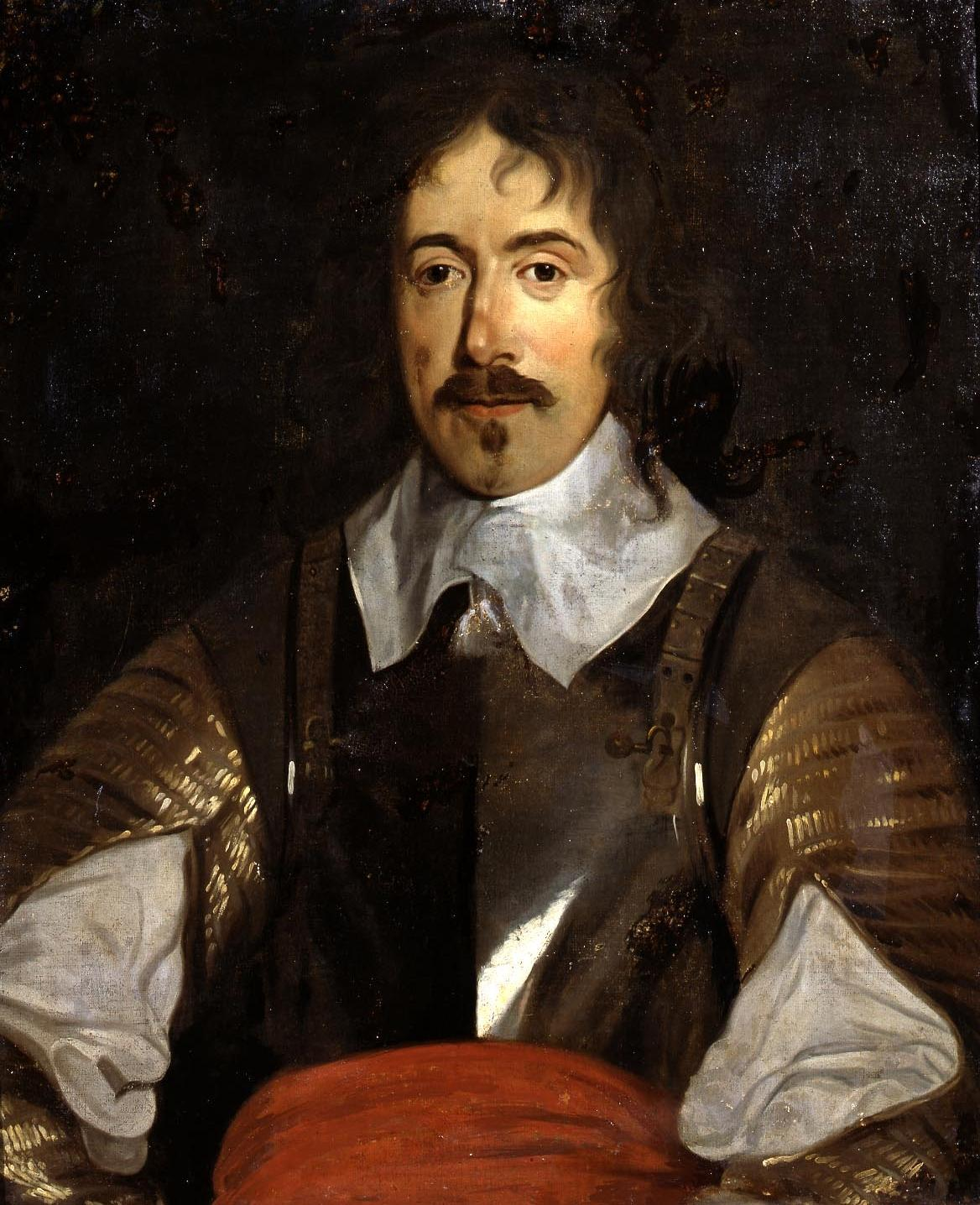
	First party	Second party
Leader	Edward Hyde	Denzil Holles
Party	Cavalier	Roundhead
Seats won	379	139
- Composition of the House of Commons after the election

The 1661 English general election returned a majority of members in support of Charles II of England. This Parliament was called the Cavalier Parliament, since many of the MPs elected were former Cavaliers or the sons of Cavaliers.

Both the Whig and Tory parties were not formed until 1678, and so in the interim 18 years, members were loosely defined rather by their obeisance or opposition to The Kings Government. These Factions initially resisted classification into parties, but by the 70s there was some understanding of the emergence of a 'court party' (in support of the King) and 'country party' (opposing him). During the course of the Parliament, there was considerable movement between these camps, both with members defecting to the other team, and with new members being called up via by-election, such that by its dissolution in 1679, 511 seats were divided into 274 Court and 237 Opposition.

== See also ==
- List of MPs elected to the English Parliament in 1661
