= Amos Walrond =

17th-century English MP

Member of the House of Commons

Personal details
- Born: c. 1623
- Died: 11 November 1668 (age 45)
- Resting place: Wells Cathedral
- Spouse: Elizabeth Lambert (m. 1668)
- Education: Trinity College, Cambridge (BA, 1642)

Amos Walrond (c.1623–1668), of Wells, Somerset was an English landowner and politician who sat in the House of Commons during the mid-17th century. He represented Tamworth as a Member of Parliament and was active in local county affairs during the Restoration period.

Walrond was born circa 1623, the fourth son of William and Susan (née Maycock) Walrond. He earned a Bachelor of Arts from Trinity College, Cambridge in 1642, then entered the Middle Temple in 1656. Circa 1668, he married Elizabeth Lambert. He died on 11 November 1668 and is buried in Wells Cathedral.
