= William Gawdy =

English politician

Sir William Gawdy, 1st Baronet (24 September 1612 – 18 August 1669) was an English politician who sat in the House of Commons from 1661 to 1669.

William Gawdy was the son of Framlingham Gawdy of West Harling, Norfolk (who had himself been MP for Thetford) and his wife Lettice Knollys daughter of Sir Robert Knollys. He was educated at Bury St Edmunds and was admitted at Caius College, Cambridge on 30 April 1629 aged 17. He was awarded BA in 1632 and was admitted at Inner Temple on 4 February 1634.

In March 1661, Gawdy was elected Member of Parliament for Thetford in the Cavalier Parliament and held the seat until his death aged 56 in 1669. He was created a baronet, of West Harling on 13 July 1663.

Gawdy married Elizabeth Duffield, daughter of John Duffield of East Wretham, Norfolk. Their eldest son Bassingbourne died of smallpox in 1660, and their second son John Gawdy succeeded to the baronetcy. Sir John Gawdy was deaf but became a painter of renown.

Baronetage of England
| New creation | Baronet (of West Harling); 1663–1669 | Succeeded by John Gawdy |
