= Sir George Reeve, 1st Baronet =

Sir George Reeve, 1st Baronet (c. 1618 - October 1678) was an English politician who sat in the House of Commons from 1660 to 1678.

Reeve was elected in 1660 as MP for Eye in the Convention Parliament. He was re-elected MP for Eye in 1661 to the Cavalier Parliament and sat until his death in 1678. He came from a Royalist family and was generally supportive of the royal court in Parliament. He was created baronet of Thwaite in the County of Suffolk on 22 January 1663. He was succeeded in the baronetcy by his son.

Baronetage of England
New creation	Baronet (of Thwaite); 1663–1978	Succeeded by Robert Reeve
