= Arthur Bold =

English lawyer and politician

Arthur Bold (c 1604 - 22 May 1677) was an English lawyer and politician who sat in the House of Commons from 1660 to 1677.

Bold was the son of Arthur Bold, of Petersfield, Hampshire. He matriculated at Magdalen Hall, Oxford on 26 June 1621, aged 17. He was called to the bar at Inner Temple in 1634 and became a bencher in 1658.

In 1660, Bold was elected Member of Parliament for Petersfield in the Convention Parliament. He was re-elected MP for Petersfield in 1661 for the Cavalier Parliament and sat until his death in 1677. In 1663 he was Autumn Reader at his Inn.
