= Harling, Norfolk =

Civil parish in Norfolk, England

Coordinates: 52.44011°N 0.93076°E

Harling
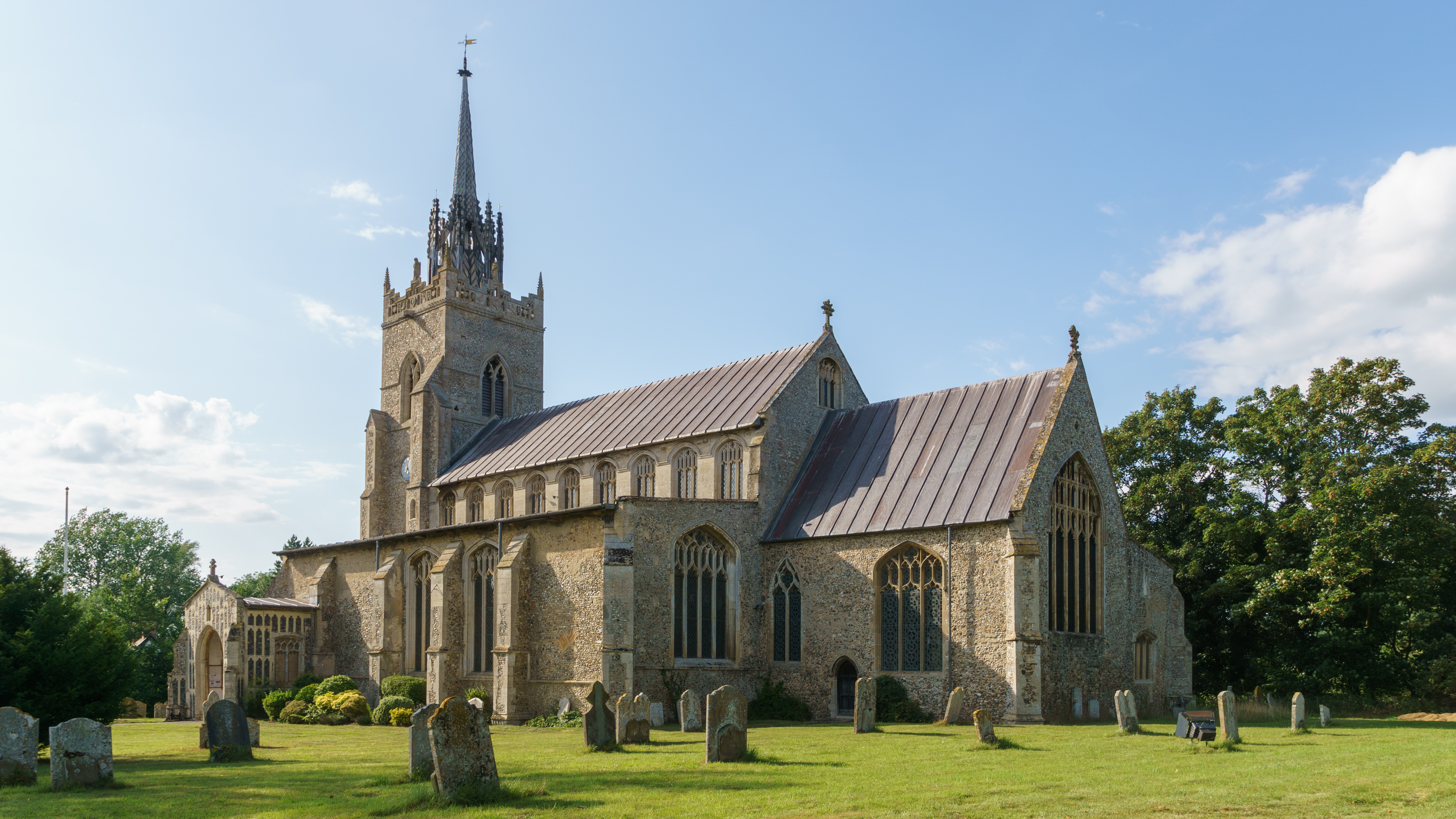
- East Harling

- Location within Norfolk
- Area: 23.19 km^{2} (8.95 sq mi)
- Population: 2,142 (2011 census)
  - Density: 92/km^{2} (240/sq mi)
- OS grid reference: TL993865
- Civil parish: Harling
- District: Breckland
- Shire county: Norfolk
- Region: East
- Country: England
- Sovereign state: United Kingdom
- Post town: NORWICH
- Postcode district: NR16
- Police: Norfolk
- Fire: Norfolk
- Ambulance: East of England

Harling is a civil parish in the Breckland district, in the English county of Norfolk. It covers an area of 23.19 km^{2} (8.95 sq mi) and had a population of 2,201 in 932 households at the 2001 census, reducing to a population of 2,142 in 941 households at the 2011 census. For the purposes of local government, it falls within the district of Breckland.

The principal settlement in the parish is the village of East Harling, other settlements include Harling Road centred on Harling Road railway station (actually in Roudham and Larling parish), Middle Harling and West Harling.

Henry Nicholas Ridley, the botanist, geologist and naturalist who was instrumental in promoting rubber trees in the Malay Peninsula, was born in the village of West Harling.
