= L'Esperance =

L'Esperance or L'Espérance (French for "The Hope"), may refer to:

- L'Espérance (newspaper), Guinean newspaper
- L'Esperance, U.S. Virgin Islands
- L'Esperance Historic District, U.S. Virgin Islands
- L'Espérance (ship), a French privateer ship captured in the action of 30 September 1780
- L'Esperance Rock, an islet in the South Pacific Ocean

== People ==
- David Ovide L'Espérance (1864–1941), Canadian politician
- Don L'Esperance (1919–2008), American politician
- Elise L'Esperance (1878–1958), American physician
- Joel L'Esperance (born 1995), American ice hockey player
- Renée L'Espérance, Jamaican model

== See also ==
- Espérance (disambiguation)
- Lesperance
