= Animal engine =

Machine powered by an animal

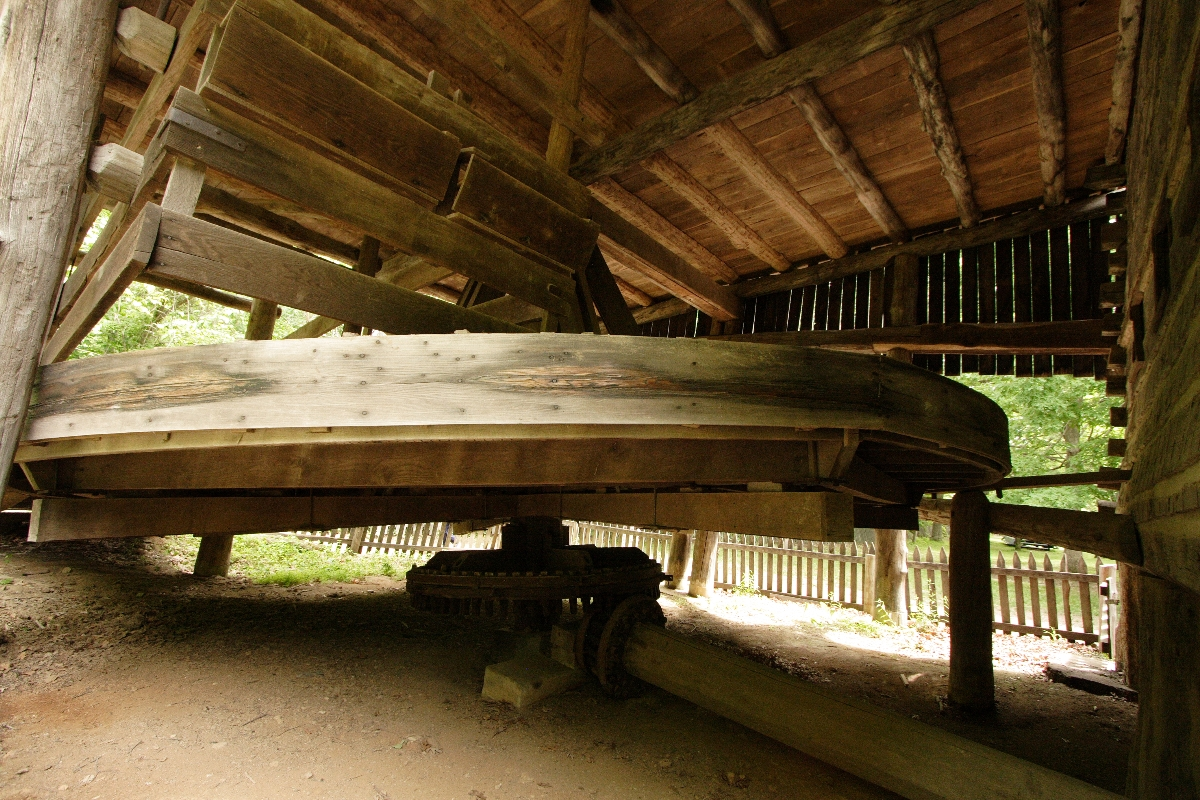
Ox powered treadwheel

An animal engine is a machine powered by an animal. Horses, donkeys, oxen, dogs, and humans have all been used in this way. An unusual example of an animal engine was recorded at Portland, Victoria in 1866. A kangaroo had been tamed and trained to work a treadmill which drove various items of machinery.

== See also ==
- Experiment (horse-powered boat)
- Gin gang
- Horse mill
- Horse engine
- Persian well
- Treadwheel
- Turnspit dog

== Books ==
- Animal Powered Machines, J. Kenneth Major. Shire Album 128 - Shire Publications 1985. ISBN 0-85263-710-1
- Walton, James (1974). Water-mills, windmills and horse-mills of South Africa. Cape Town: C. Struik Publishers. ISBN 978-0-86977-040-5.
- Pond, Wilson G. (2005). Encyclopedia of Animal Science. Marcel Dekker. ISBN 9780824754969.
