= Esperance =

Esperance may refer to:

- Esperance (town), New York
- Esperance (village), New York
- Esperance, Quartier Militaire (village), Quartier Militaire, Moka, Mauritius
- Esperance, Washington
- Esperance, Western Australia
  - Goldfields–Esperance, a large region in Western Australia
  - Shire of Esperance, a local government area in Western Australia
  - Esperance (suburb), the CBD of Esperance, Western Australia
  - Esperance Bay, the bay Esperance is located on
- Cape Esperance, Solomon Islands
  - Battle of Cape Esperance, a WWII naval battle
- Exuperantia (Esperance), French saint
- HMS Esperance, two ships of the Royal Navy

== See also ==
- Espérance (disambiguation)
