= Team boat =

Watercraft powered by horses or mules

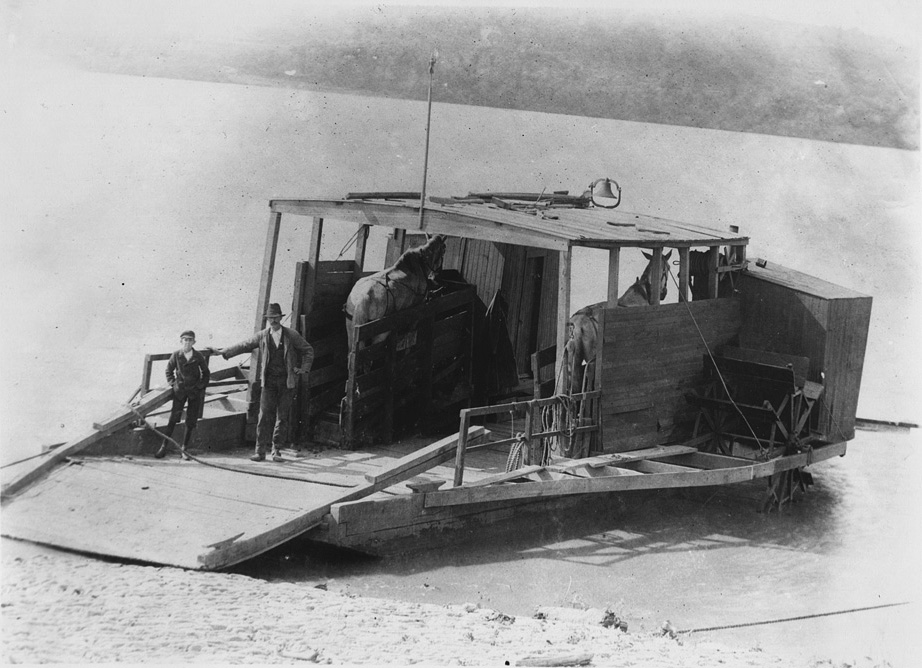
Horse ferry in Chillicothe, Ohio in 1900. Two horses for power, with Capt. Horace McElfresh and son.

A team boat, horse boat, or horse ferry, is a watercraft powered by horses or mules, generally using a treadmill, which serves as a horse engine. Team boats were popular as ferries in the United States from the mid-1810s to the 1850s.

== Types ==
The first documented horse-powered boat in the United States was built on the Delaware River in 1791 by John Fitch.

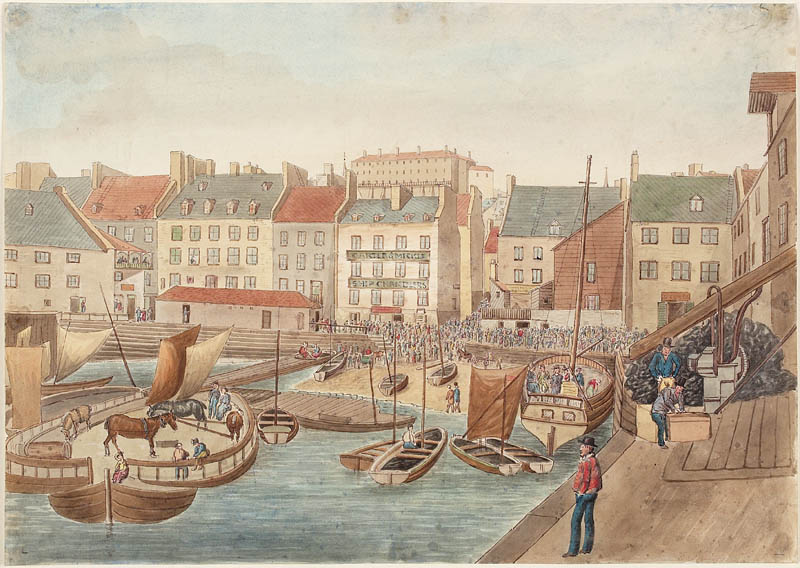
Lower Market Place, McCallum's Wharf, Quebec, Quebec, July 4, 1829.

There are three types of team boats. In one, four or five horses are placed in each side of the boat in a circular treadwheel, and the paddle wheels, arranged like the side wheel steamboat of later days were turned by means of cogs and gearing connected with other cogs on the shaft of the paddle wheels. The horses were hitched to strong timbers and by a forward movement of the feet caused the treadwheel upon which they stood to revolve and thus operate the gear wheels.

Another type of team boat uses a "horse whim," a type of horse mill. It has a large revolving wheel in the middle, and a center post known as a "whim" (or horse capstan). The horses, which are attached to the horse whim, walk around in a circle, causing the wheel or capstan to revolve, which in turn rotates gears that rotate the paddles, or bucket wheels. The team boat of this style consisted of two complete hulls, united by a deck or bridge, but separated far enough apart to allow the paddle wheel to be set between them. They are sharp at both ends, and can be propelled backward or forward with equal ease.

A third design for team boats was invented in 1819, by Barnabas Langdon. Langdon's turntable design permitted the horses to walk straight ahead instead of in circles. "Langdon placed a rotating turntable slightly below the level of the boat's deck; horses stood atop the turntable through large slots in the deck and drove the wheel backward by walking in place. This design eased the burden on the horses, freed up valuable deck space, and allowed the ferry to be built atop one hull."

One description of a turntable type team boat using six horses says, "The treadmills, on either side, were each trod by three horses always facing in the same direction. To reverse the paddlewheels it was only necessary to stop the horses a minute, and withdraw a drop pin that would reverse the gearing."

== The Experiment ==
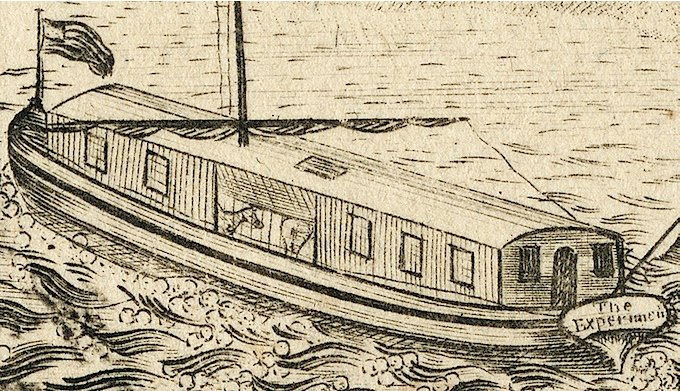
The Experiment, 1808 horse paddle-boat

The Experiment, built sometime around 1807–1810, was an early horse-powered ferry boat. It was a twelve-ton three-mast boat drawing a few feet of water, about 100 feet long by 20 feet beam. Its driving mechanism, an in-water screw, was invented by David Grieve in 1801. The boat was constructed by David Wilkinson (some sources give his name as Varnum) in 1807 to 1810, depending on the source. It was propelled by a "goose-foot paddle" large mechanical screw propeller in the water (instead of a paddle wheel at water surface). The new technology devised by Grieve and Wilkinson was powered by eight horses on a treadmill. The horse boat technology to propel the boat upstream was originally invented by David Grieve and granted a patent February 24, 1801 in the patent category of "Boats to ascend rivers". The complete recorded patent was lost in the 1836 U.S. Patent Office fire. The novel idea of propelling vessels upstream by the use of a large mechanical screw in the water is now referred to as Ericsson’s propeller.

== Commercial service and ferries ==
One of the first documented team boats in commercial service in the United States began running a Manhattan-Brooklyn route in 1814. Carrying vehicles, horses, and two hundred humans on a typical run, it could take anywhere from eight to eighteen minutes to finish the East River crossing. Team boats continued to serve New York City until 1824.

Team boat ferries were very popular. First, they were thought to be cheaper to operate than any other type of ferry boat, and second, they did not incur fees under the Fulton-Livingston patents monopoly. In ferry service, horses could be stabled on land, and there was no need to feed them on the boat, because the work was intermittent.

There were cases in which team boats replaced steam boats for reasons of economy. In 1812, two steam boats designed by Robert Fulton were placed in use in New York, for the Paulus Hook Ferry from the foot of Cortlandt Street, and on the Hoboken Ferry from the foot of Barclay Street. The Juliana, running from Barclay Street, was withdrawn from service, as announced, in favor of the more convenient horse boat. It is almost certain, however, that this retrograde step was taken because of the monopoly enjoyed by Mssrs. Fulton and Livingston for the navigation of the waters of New York State by steam. In 1816, a steamboat company running ferry service between Halifax, Nova Scotia and Dartmouth had the law amended to permit the use of team boats instead.

In August 1816, the team boat Moses Rogers in Newburgh, New York began service to Fishkill, New York, carrying wagons, coaches, carriages, horses, and passengers. In 1817, the Union Team Boat ran between Long Bridge at Georgetown and Alexandria, Virginia. In 1821, William Dyer built a team boat serving Portsmouth, Virginia on the Elizabeth River.

In 1838, Tremaine's Team Boat, using three horses, operated a ferry service at Charlottetown, Prince Edward Island. Team boats with eight horses operated on the Ohio River at Cincinnati in 1819, and at Charleston, South Carolina, on the Ashley River in 1818 and 1827. The team boat crossing the Ohio could accommodate a stagecoach driving aboard.

Attempts were made with moderate success to ascend the Ohio and Mississippi with teams of horses on board. In 1824 the team boat Genius of Georgia operated on the Savannah River, under Captain William Bird, carrying a cargo of sundries. An 1820 report by the South Carolina Department of Public Works described a five-man boat powered by eight mules; it carried 300 bales of cotton 250 miles in fifteen days at a cost of just $116.25. However, for through traffic, the team boats never passed the experimental stage.

The South Ferry horse ferry operating at Albany, New York in 1827 was replaced by a steamboat in 1828. The North Ferry horse ferry at Albany operated from 1831-1841.

The team boats on the Delaware River serving Camden, New Jersey stopped for an hour at lunch time to feed the horses. The Ridgeway was a double team boat, propelled by nine horses walking around a circle. She ran from the foot of Cooper Street. There was also a team boat named the Washington; she ran from Market Street, Camden, to Market Street, Philadelphia. Other team boats followed in succession, namely the Phoenix, Constitution, Moses Lancaster, and Independence. The Cooper's Ferry Daybook, 1819-1824, documenting Camden's Point Pleasant Teamboat, survives to this day.

Horse powered ferries have also been documented in Wisconsin and New Hampshire.

A shipwreck discovered in 1983 in Lake Champlain, the Burlington Bay Horse Ferry, is an example of a turntable team-boat. It served on one of approximately five horse ferry crossings operating on Lake Champlain from about 1820 to 1850. They reached their peak in the 1830s and 1840s, before their 1850s replacement by steamboats.

In the 1880s, in New Haven, Missouri and Waverly, Missouri, the Tilda Clara and General Harrison ferries across the Missouri River were powered by four horse teams.

A ferry powered by horses and mules operated on the Mississippi River at St. Mary, Missouri as recently as 1910. The last known horse ferry remained in service until the late 1920s on the Tennessee River.

== See also ==
- Horsecar
- Horse-drawn boat
- Horse engine
- Horse mill
- Paddle steamer
- Treadwheel
