= Espérance =

See also Esperance (disambiguation)

Espérance (French pronunciation: [ɛspeʁɑ̃s]) is one of the two French words that can be translated into "hope", the other being "espoir". Whereas the latter is closer to the idea of "dream" or "fantasy" and corresponds to most of the common uses of "hope", "espérance" refers to an abstract, positive expectation. It is rarely used compared to its counterpart, except in the field of mathematics, where it refers to the Expected value, and in religious texts. The name is used for organizations in many Francophone countries.

Places

- Espérance, French Guiana, a village near Saint-du-Maroni, French Guiana
- Espérance, Mauritius, a village in the district of Moka, Mauritius

Union

- Espérance Club, a trade union for girl dressmakers in 19th and early 20th century London, England

Sports clubs

- Espérance Sportive de Tunis, a football club in Tunisia
- Espérance Sportive de Tunis (handball), the handball team of Espérance Sportive de Tunis
- Espérance Sportive de Tunis (volleyball), the volleyball team of Espérance Sportive de Tunis
- Espérance Sportive de Tunis (basketball), the basketball team of Espérance Sportive de Tunis
- Espérance Football Club, Rwandan football club
- Espérance Guider, Cameroonian football club
- Espérance Sportive de Zarzis, Tunisian football club
- Espérance Sportive Troyes Aube Champagne, French football club

Ship

- French ship Espérance (1781)

== See also ==
- L'Espérance (disambiguation)
