= Experiment (horse-powered boat) =

Horse-powered boat

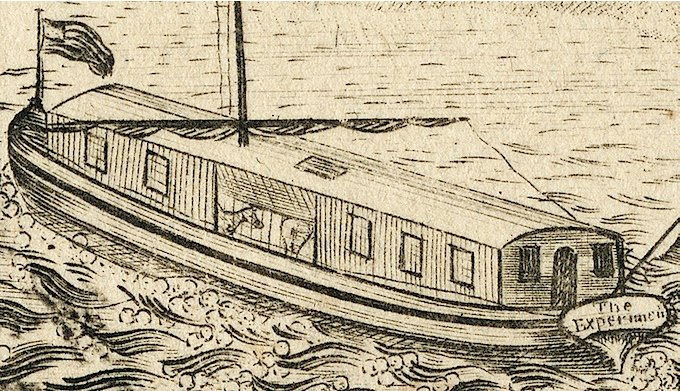
- Experiment

History
- Name: Experiment
- Builder: David Wilkinson

General characteristics
- Tonnage: 12
- Length: 100 ft (30.48 m)
- Beam: 20 ft (6.1 m)
- Installed power: eight horses on a treadmill contraption
- Propulsion: "goose-foot paddle" large mechanical screw propeller
- Speed: 4 knots (7.4 km/h)

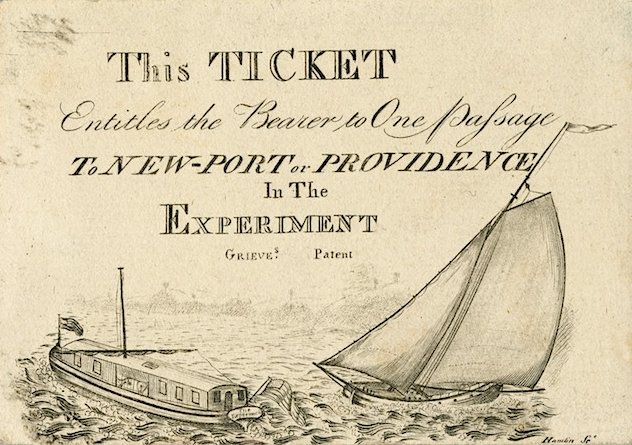
Ticket for Experiment

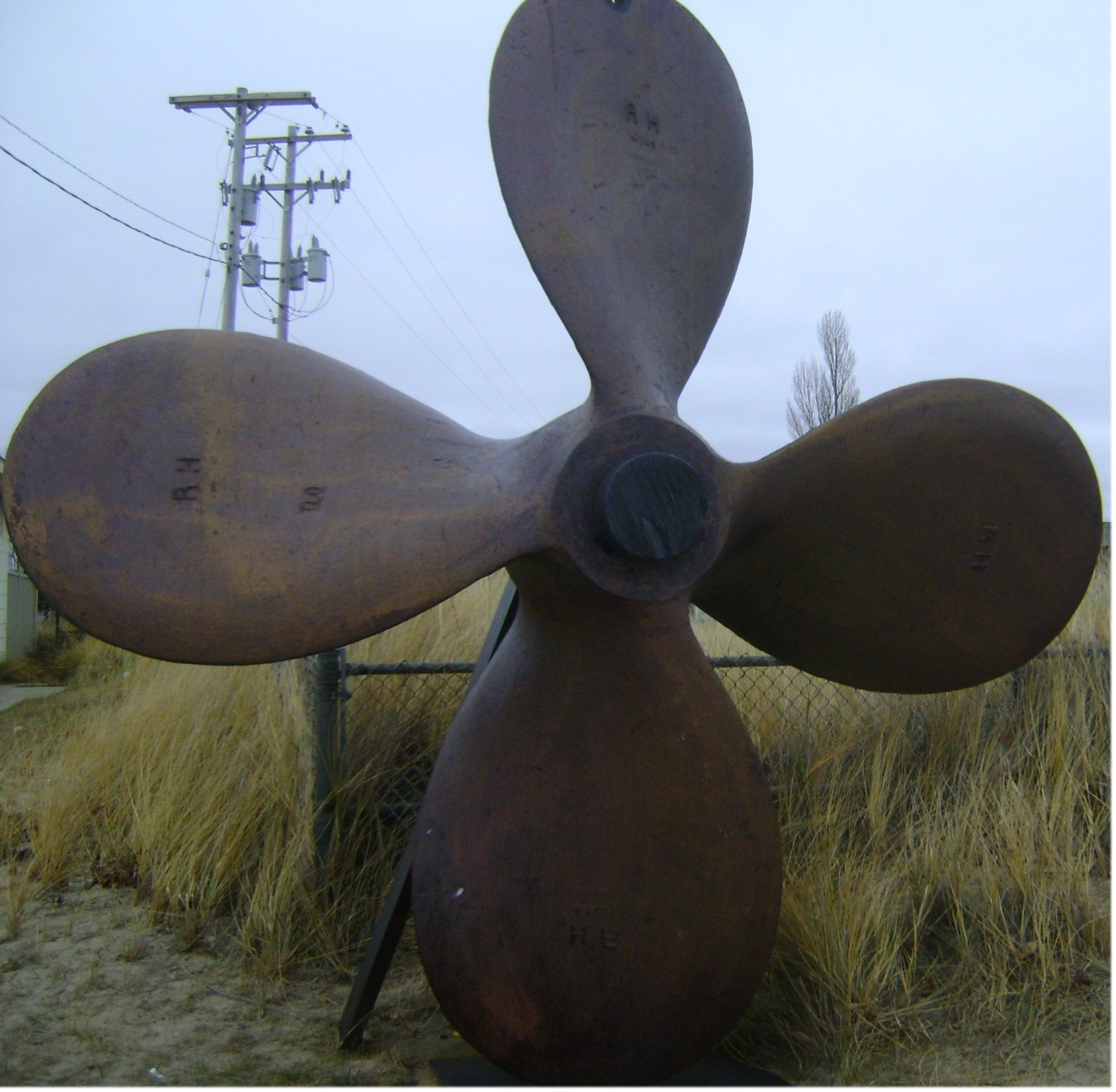
Screw propeller similar to one used by Experiment

Experiment was an early 19th-century boat powered by horses and incorporating the idea of a screw propeller, which was a new idea at the time.

== History ==
Experiment was a horse-powered ferry boat. It was a 12-ton, three-masted boat drawing a few feet of water, about 100 feet (30.48 m) long by 20 feet (6.1 m) beam.) in 1807 to 1810, depending on the source. It was propelled by a "goose-foot paddle," a large mechanical screw propeller in the water instead of a paddle wheel at water surface. The new technology devised by Grieve and Wilkinson was powered by eight horses on a treadmill. The technology to propel the boat upstream was originally invented by David Grieve and granted a patent 24 February 1801 in the category of "Boats to ascend rivers". The complete recorded patent was lost in the 1836 U.S. Patent Office fire. The idea of propelling vessels by a mechanical screw in the water is now referred to as Ericsson's propeller.

=== Maiden voyage ===
It is reported that Experiment made one unsuccessful voyage, as it ran aground on the return trip. The mechanism and associated parts were put together by Ephraim Southworth; little thought was put into the construction and it was poorly built. The maiden voyage was in June 1809 with a group of gentlemen from the Grand Lodge of the State. The first attempt of the "Screw Boat" began at Jackson's Wharf on Eddy's Point near Providence, Rhode Island, with a destination of Pawtuxet Village. The eight horses for the "horse power" were owned by Marvin Morris; they were connected to a poorly designed contraption to make the boat move. It obtained a top speed of four knots with the help of a tide going in her direction and the wind on her back. It managed to get to Pawtuxet Village, where there was much celebration over its success. The return trip, however, resulted in humiliation when a gust of wind drove Experiment onto mud flats, causing its demise.

=== Financial failure ===
The Experiment venture had sold shares of stock from a prospectus to raise money to build it. There was so much confidence in the venture that tickets were engraved by William Hamlin for its anticipated voyages to New-Port and Providence. Ultimately, the horse boat and all the associated items were seized by the sheriff at the behest of Grieve's creditors and sold for lack of payments on the loans, since it was not a successful venture. Wilkinson later said that "after the frolic" it was "hauled up" and allowed to go to waste and ruin. Nevertheless, the ship was carefully studied by Daniel French, who did the drawings for Robert Fulton's North River Steamboat (known as Clermont), and may have benefited that enterprise.

Experiment is important as a precursor of public transportation on rivers, and it was the forerunner of a number of horse-powered boats, chiefly ferries used for more than a half-century along the eastern seaboard of the United States. Most commonly, those were paddle wheel boats, not screw-type propellers. Inclined treadmills were often used.

== See also ==
- Animal-powered transport – Domesticated animals for assisting people
- Horse-drawn boat – Canal boat pulled by a horse on a towpath
- Team boat – Watercraft powered by horses or mules
- Horse mill – Type of mill powered by horses
- Horse engine – Machine powered by a horse
- Marine propulsion – Systems for generating thrust for ships and boats on water
- Paddle steamer – Steam-powered vessel propelled by paddle wheels includes comment regarding animal drive ships
- Treadwheel – Form of engine typically powered by humans
- Working animal – Domesticated animals for assisting people
