= Lesperance =

Lesperance, or Lespérance, is a surname. It may refer to:

== Lesperance ==
- David Lesperance, United States Army major general
- Ellen Lesperance (born 1971), American artist and educator, known for her paintings
- Matt Lesperance (born 1987), American wheelchair basketball player
- Pete Lesperance, Canadian musician and producer
- Jeffrey Lesperance, United States Army Colonel

== Lespérance ==
- Sylvie Lespérance (1954–2006), Canadian politician from Quebec
- Zotique Lespérance (1910–2006), Canadian sportswriter

== See also ==
- L'Esperance (disambiguation)
