= L'Esperance Historic District =

- U.S. National Register of Historic Places
- U.S. Historic district
- Location within the U.S. Virgin Islands
- Location: East of Cruz Bay off Center Line Rd., Reef Bay, Virgin Islands
- Coordinates: 18°20′33″N 64°45′30″W
- Area: 6.3 acres (2.5 ha)
- Built: 1719
- MPS: Virgin Islands National Park MRA
- NRHP reference No.: 81000699
- Added to NRHP: July 23, 1981

The L'Esperance Historic District, located east of Cruz Bay off Center Line Rd., on Saint John in the U.S. Virgin Islands, is a historic district which was listed on the National Register of Historic Places in 1981. It is located within Virgin Islands National Park. The listing included two contributing structures and nine contributing sites on 6.3 acres (2.5 ha).

It was a prime sugar plantation area, for agricultural purposes, due to the quality of its soil, its permanent spring as a water supply, and its relatively high precipitation. In a compact area the plantation had numerous buildings including two horsemills, a factory, a cistern, a great house, a cook house, a storage building, a cemetery, and a stone bridge, plus retaining walls and stone fencing.

It was deemed architecturally notable for the high quality of workmanship observable in its Great House and in its service buildings' "masonry as well as the use of volcanic sandstone as a building material. This exotic material to the Virgin Islands was probably imported from the Leeward Islands."
