= Horse engine =

Machine powered by a horse

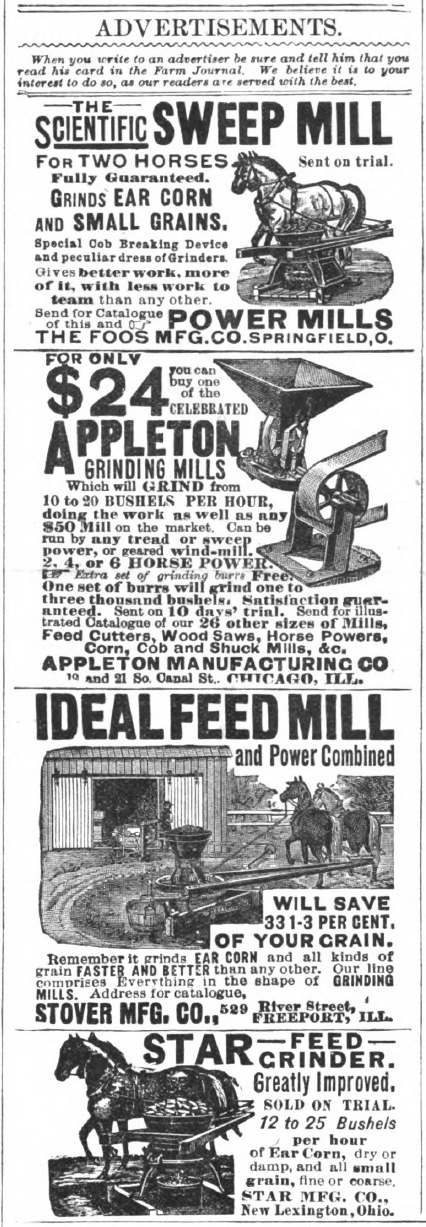
1893 advertisements in Farm Journal for horse tread powers and sweep powers, and for various mills that horses can power (feed/fodder cutters and grain grinders)

A horse engine (also called a horse power or horse-power or horse-gin) is a (now largely obsolete) machine for using draft horses to power other machinery. It is a type of animal engine that was very common before internal combustion engines and electrification. Mills driven by horse powers were called horse mills. Horse engines were often portable so that they could be attached to whichever implement they were needed for at the time. Others were built into horse-engine houses.

A common design for the horse engine was a large treadmill on which one or more horses walked. The surface of the treadmill was made of wooden slats linked like a chain. Rotary motion from the treadmill was first passed to a planetary gear system, and then to a shaft or pulley that could be coupled to another machine. Such powers were called tread powers, railway powers, or endless-chain powers. Another common design was the horse wheel or sweep power, in which one or several horses walked in a circle, turning a shaft at the center.

Examples of farm machinery powered with a horse engine include gristmills (see horse mill), threshing machines, corn shellers, feed cutters, silo blowers, grain grinders, pumps, and saws such as bucksaws and lumber mill saws. They could also be used interchangeably with other forms of power, such as a hand crank, stationary engine, portable engine, or the flat belt pulley or PTO shaft of a tractor, which eventually replaced them on most American and European farms.

Today there are still a few modern versions used by Amish people that assist in farm chores and that power machine shops via line shafts.

== Designs, terms, and output ==
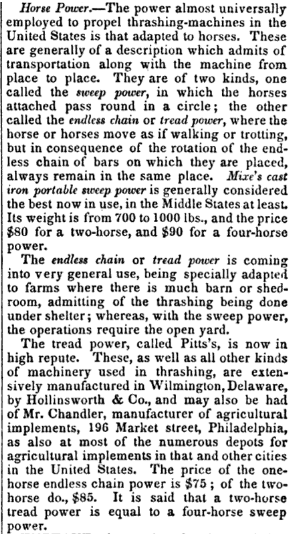
1844 summary of horse power used to run farm threshing machines

Many horse-engine houses were built in Britain in the late 18th and early 19th centuries. Relative to 1-horse and 2-horse powers, they could provide larger amounts of power through larger teams. Powering threshing machines was one of their main applications. They were not portable but were commonly erected in a purpose-built barn known as the gin-gang The farm culture of Britain was well suited to their stationary nature, as farming communities tended to be organized around villages. In North America, portable horse powers were more usual, with family farms spread far and wide. Even in cases where equipment was not owned by each farm—for example, owned jointly in co-ops or hired on a custom (job) basis—it tended to be portable, moving from farm to farm over country roads.

In the 19th century, even boats were powered by horse engines. Team boats were popular for river ferries.

Circa 1828, the Westminster Cracker Factory's machinery was powered by horse engine; steam power followed, and by 1922, the bakery was electrified.

Wendel (2004) provides contemporary drawings from advertisements.

=== Strength and power ===
The term "horse power" probably predates the name of the horsepower unit of measurement. (Note: Mills driven by horse powers were called horse mills. Horse engines were often portable so that they could be attached to whichever implement they were needed for at the time. Others were built into horse-engine houses.) The word "power" in late-19th-century American English, for example, was often used for any example in the whole category of power sources, including water powers, wind powers, horse powers (for example, sweep powers), dog powers, and even (in a few cases) sheep powers; in the Pennsylvania Oil Country during that era, sweep-style powers run by steam engines and gas engines to power oil derricks were called "powers" in the local vocabulary, just as horse powers on farms were also often simply called "powers", unless specification of the type was needed, in which case terms such as "tread power" or "sweep power" were used. Regional norms determined which term was more common in any given region or country.

Power output was limited by the size of the team. Horse powers were often run with a single horse or a two-horse team, which means that, judged by today's standards, not much power output was available and the feed mill or pump being driven was a rather small one. Regarding choice of type, at various times and places there were accepted notions of conventional wisdom, such as that more usable power per horse came from a tread power than from a sweep power (in other words, that a sweep power was less efficient of the horse's effort) or that a tread power would wear down a horse prematurely (a notion roundly refuted by others).

== See also ==
- Horse mill
- Whim (horse capstan)
