= L'Esperance, U.S. Virgin Islands =

Coordinates: 18°20′25″N 64°45′33″W

L'Esperance is a former plantation on the island of Saint John in the United States Virgin Islands. It is uninhabited and part of Virgin Islands National Park. The L'Esperance trail is maintained by the National Park Service.
