= Gin gang =

Structure built to enclose a horse engine

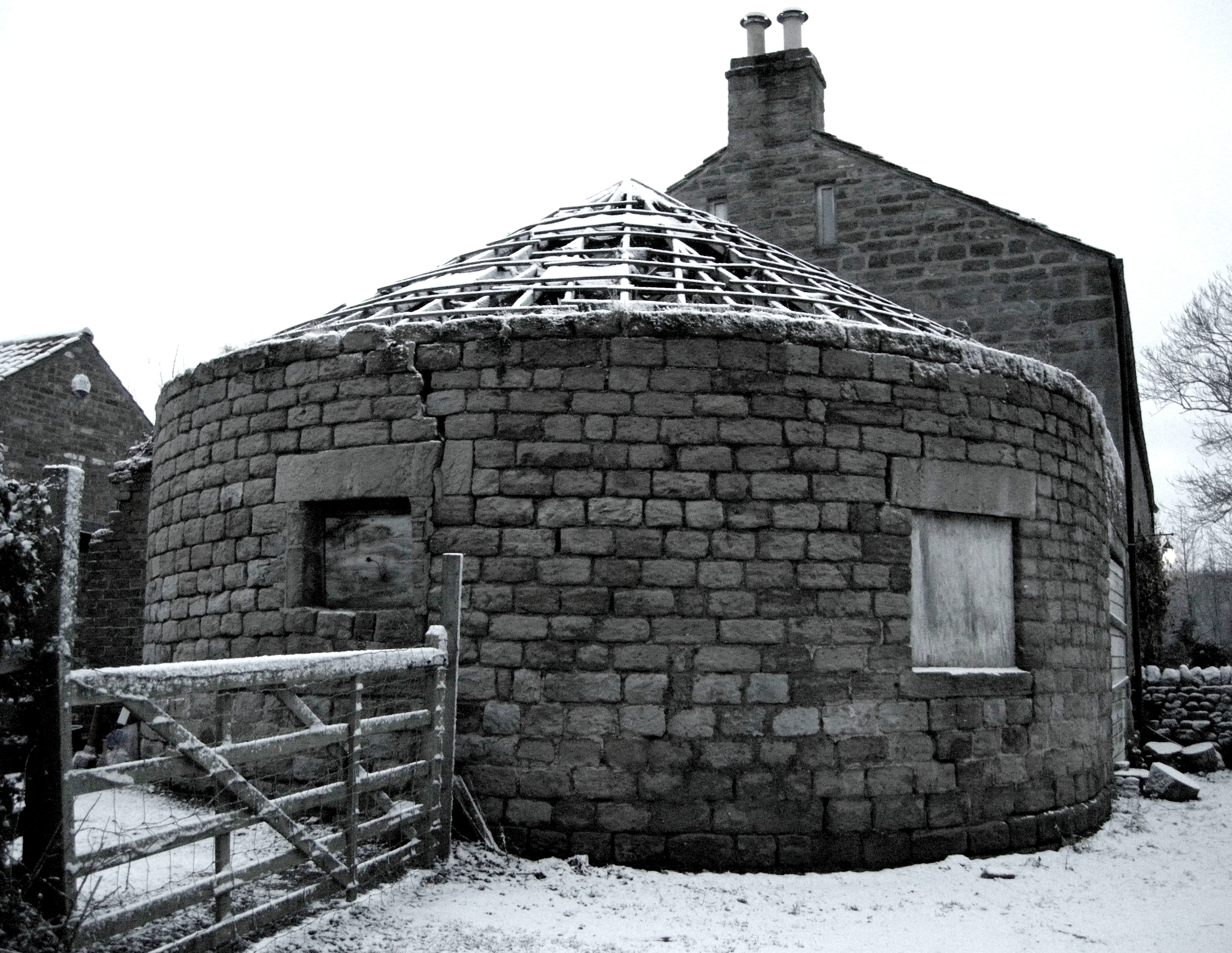
Gin gang at Burn Bridge, North Yorkshire

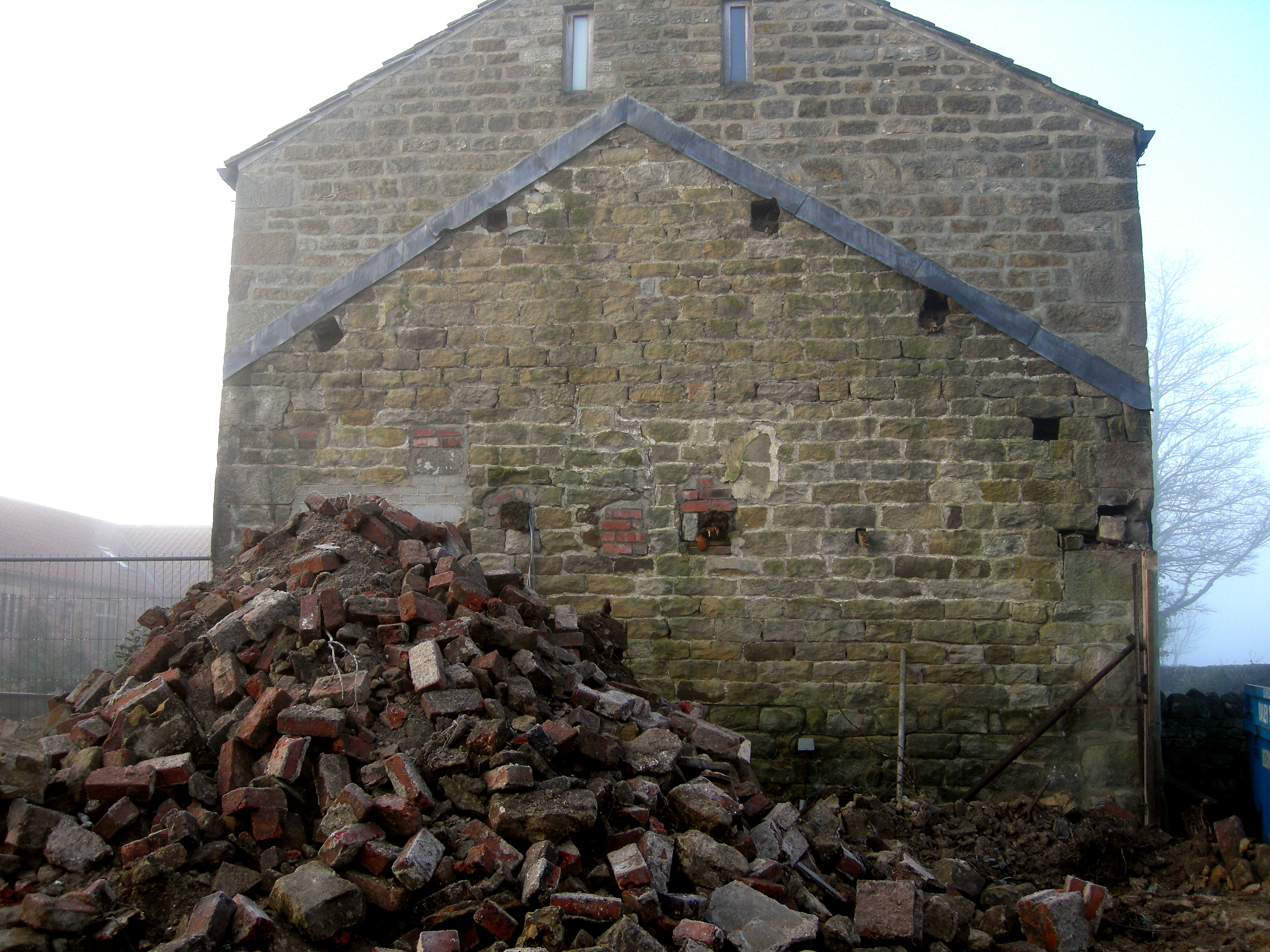
The Burn Bridge gin gang demolished due to disrepair, November 2010, to be rebuilt as domestic accommodation

A gin gang, wheelhouse, roundhouse or horse-engine house is a structure built to enclose a horse engine, usually circular but sometimes square or octagonal, attached to a threshing barn. Most were built in England in the late 18th and early 19th centuries. The threshing barn held a small threshing machine which was connected to the gin gang via wooden gears, drive shafts and drive belt, and was powered by a horse which walked round and round inside the gin gang.

== Operation and structure ==
The gin (short for "engine") was the motive power driving a small threshing machine, and the horse did the gang, or going. The gin gang was always attached to the main threshing barn, where the gin was situated. It was almost always of one storey and it could be circular, polygonal or square. There was a hole for a drive−shaft or drive−belt, linking it with the threshing barn. The gin was connected by cogs to a vertical spindle. The spindle was connected to a horizontal arrangement including a shaft attached to a horse, which turned the spindle and powered the machine by ganging or walking round and round the cogs and vertical spindle inside the walls of the gin gang. This arrangement was necessary in locations where there was no power for a water wheel, hence in Wales and Ireland there is evidence of fewer gin gangs.

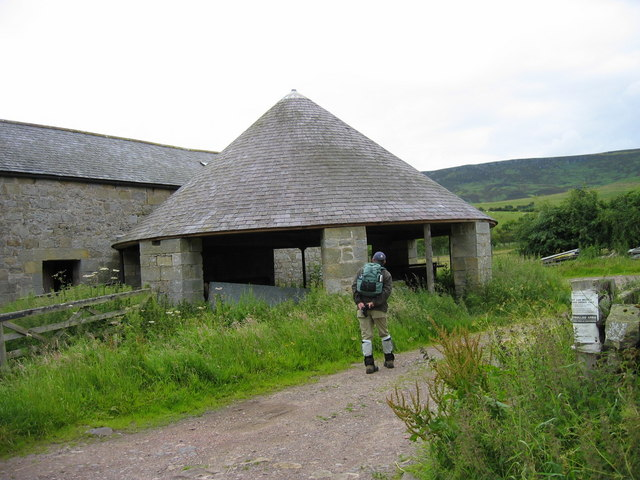
Gin gang at Hepple, Northumberland

Gin gangs were not usually thatched but were stone−flagged, tiled or pantiled, possibly because the gin damaged potential thatching straw. Its structure tended to reflect locally available materials and hence local vernacular building style, because railways had not generally distributed brick and slate. Building materials include thatch in Sussex, pantiles in North Yorkshire, stone tiles and sandstone in Northumberland, granite pillars in Devon, wooden poles and flint in Norfolk, weatherboarding in Berkshire, brick in the East Riding of Yorkshire, white Magnesian Limestone in West Yorkshire, ironstone in Bedfordshire, and one instance of hexagonal ashlar pillars salvaged from Finchale Priory in Finchale, County Durham. Gin gangs were required to shelter the wooden gears, and not to protect the horse; hence in some places there is evidence of horse−walks or open−air horse−powered threshing machines instead. The horse in the gin gang could also power machinery outdoors.

== History and distribution ==
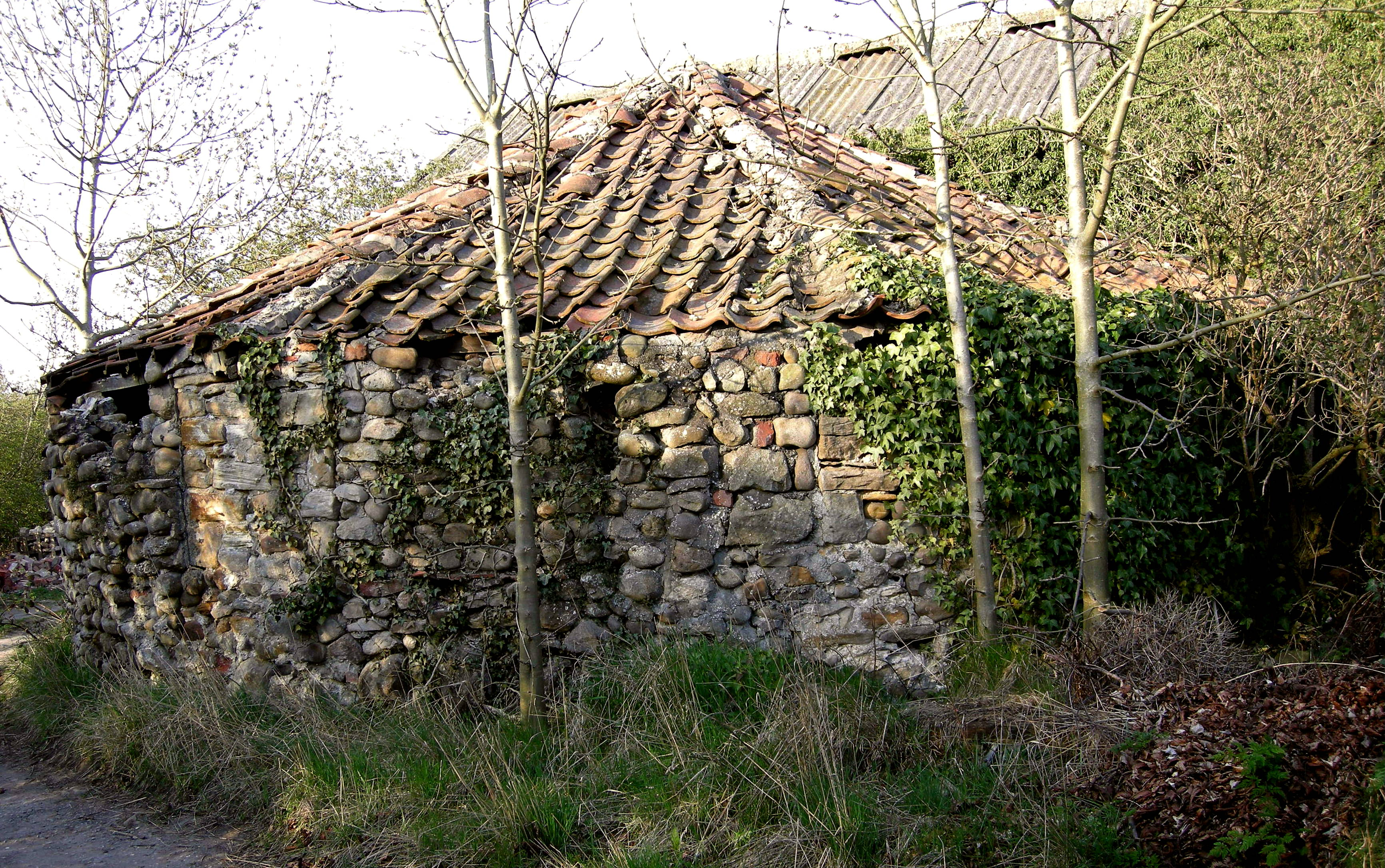
Gin gang at Stapleton, Richmondshire

Local names for covered gin gangs were covered gin−house, covered horse−walk, enginehouse, gin−case, gin−gan, gin−gang, gin−house, gin−race, horse−gear, horse mill/horse-mill, round−house, track−shed, four−wheelhouse, wheel−rig, wheel−shade and wheel−shed. These are not to be confused with the uncovered ones which were called gin−circle, ginnyring, horse−course, horse−gang, horse−path, horse−track and horse−walk. In Scotland, Wales, and Warwickshire a gin gang was commonly called a horse engine house.

In 1976, 1,300 gin gangs were identified in Great Britain, and a few others in Ireland, Denmark, the Netherlands, and East Germany. Most gin gangs were built from around 1785 to 1851, peaking in 1800 to 1830. The most recent ones were built in the Isle of Wight and Cornwall from 1845 to 1868. In the 19th century there were 575 gin gangs in Northumberland and 227 in West Cumberland, but between the 1890s and the 1960s, hundreds of these were destroyed. In the 1970s, 276 survived in Northumberland and 200 in County Durham. In the same decade a survey found most remaining gin gangs were in the north−east and south−west of England, and it was suggested that this distribution could have been affected by the 1830 Swing Riots which destroyed most threshing machines in the south−east of England. As a result of this, in the 1970s Scotland still had 150 gin gangs, North East England had 800 and Cornwall had 100 remaining, but Wiltshire and Berkshire had 8 between them. Conversely, the Napoleonic Wars of 1803 to 1815 created a dearth of labour and a corresponding demand for gin gangs in Cornwall, Devon, and Dorset. The truly portable horse engine was invented around 1840; this obviated the necessity for building further gin gangs.

== Existing gin gangs ==
No gin gang remains in operation commercially; the known examples outside museums are either derelict or have been renovated as barn conversions. These are Hutton AHR, Keys farm buildings, Scran horse engine house, Scran Friars Croft Dunbr, Carsegour gingang, Westruther gingang, RCAHM Skildinny, horse engine house Perth and Kinross, Sanday, Muggleswick gin gang, Holbeck farmhouse, Colton farmhouse, Ystum Colwyn farm Meifod, Beamish, Brewers House Museum and Forkneuk Horse Engine House at Uphall in West Lothian,

=== Remnant or derelict ===
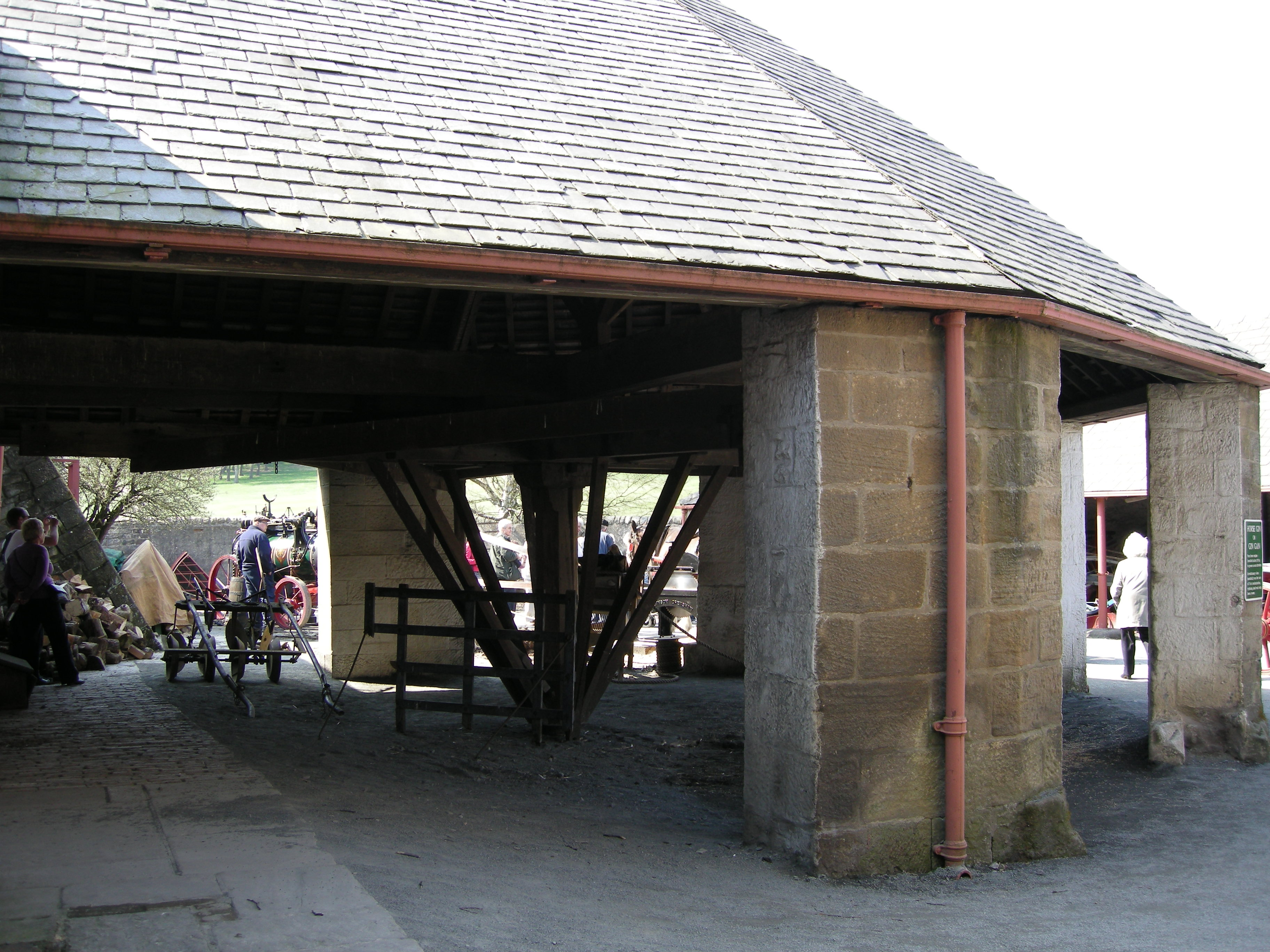
Semi-octagonal gin gang with horse mill inside, at Beamish Museum

The surviving Low Walworth gin gang was built around the late 18th century. In Northumberland examples exist in Harlow Hill, Hepple, Redesmouth and Stanton. In North Yorkshire two remain at Burn Bridge and Stapleton (see Commons link below). Scottish examples survive at St Quivox, South Ayrshire, at Dunbar, East Lothian, and at Carsegour, Kinross, but the one at Westruther, Westertown in Berwickshire appears to have been destroyed since 1974. The site of a former gin gang exists at Kildinny steading at Forteviot in Strathearn, Scotland. However quite a few do survive in Perth and Kinross, and there is one at Tresness Farm on Sanday in Orkney. There is a listed gin gang at The Grange farmhouse at Muggleswick in County Durham, and there used to be one in 1979 at Holbeck farmhouse in Barrow-in-Furness. There is an example at Nettlecombe in Somerset. There is an extant gin gang at Ystum Colwyn Farm, Meifod, in Wales. The Beamish Museum in County Durham contains a restored gin gang. Another has been preserved at Weald and Downland Open Air Museum but is now labelled as a horse whim for raising water, as is the one at Brewers' House Museum in Antwerp.

=== Barn conversions ===
In Chopwell in Tyne and Wear a gin gang is part of a barn conversion. Another one was renovated to become holiday cottages in the face of local controversy at Lanchester, County Durham. A barn conversion development, from a group of farm buildings known as a steading including an octagonal gin gang, was completed in 2010 at Longhorsley, Northumberland. Another example survives as a barn conversion at Southstoke, Somerset. Another recent renovation completed in January 2013 is The Wheelhouse in Barton North Yorkshire, now a holiday let.

== Gin gang at Beamish Museum ==
=== Building ===
Home Farm at the Beamish Museum, County Durham, contains an early 19th-century, semi-octagonal gin gang with sandstone or millstone grit walls and slate roof. The renovated internal roof structure is based on a traditional space frame truss with its primary plane in line with the tie beam (or joist), and with members fixed between king post and rafters to support the semi-octagonal plan of the roof. There is one main transverse oak tie beam on which the king post of the main truss is based. The king post is in tension to prevent sagging of the horizontal tie beam, so neither the king post nor the tie beam are resting on the mill below. The roof construction is not structurally dependent on the horse mill, or connected with it.

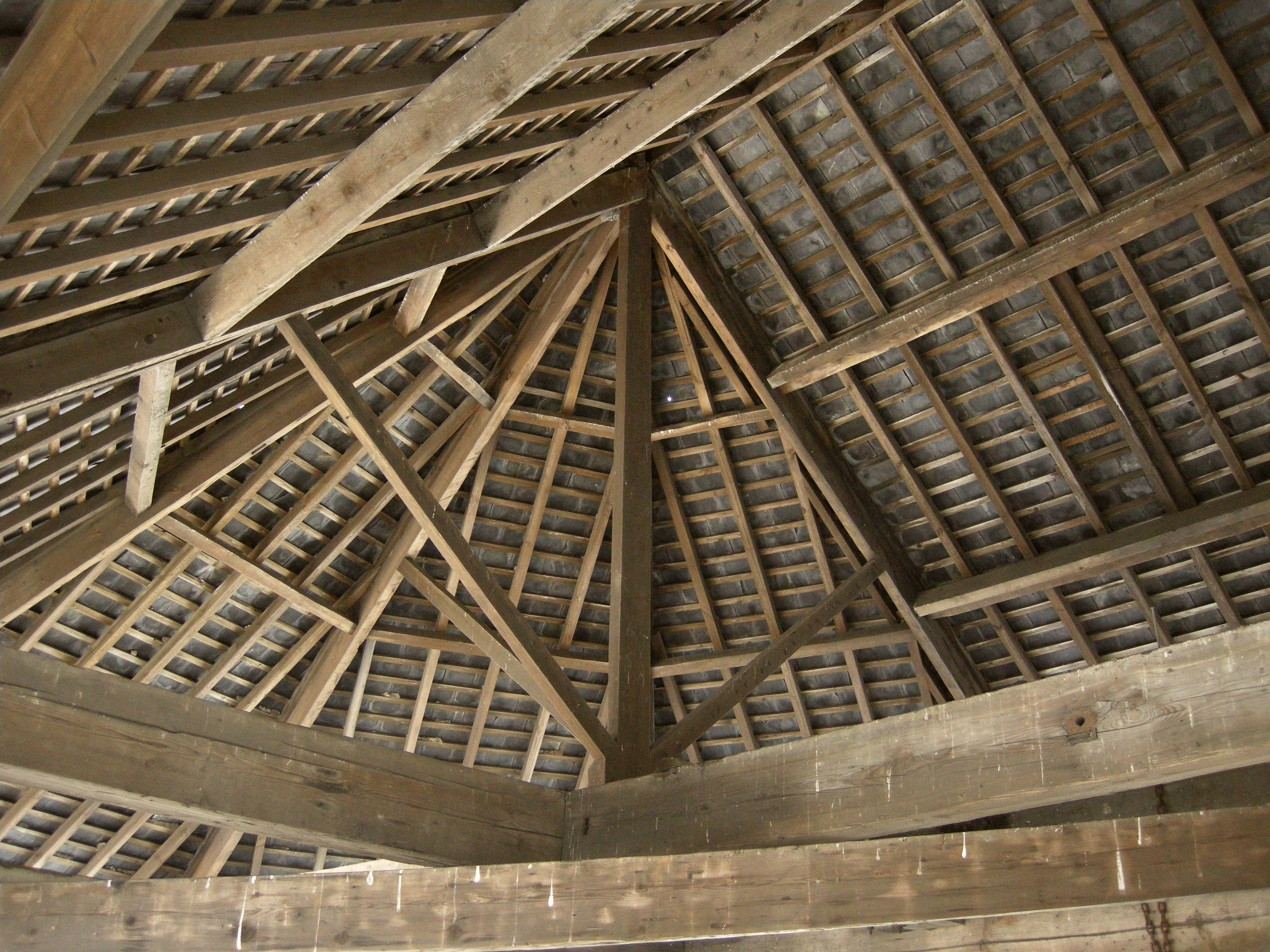
Top part of space frame truss (bottom tie beam of truss hidden behind the mill's tie beam)

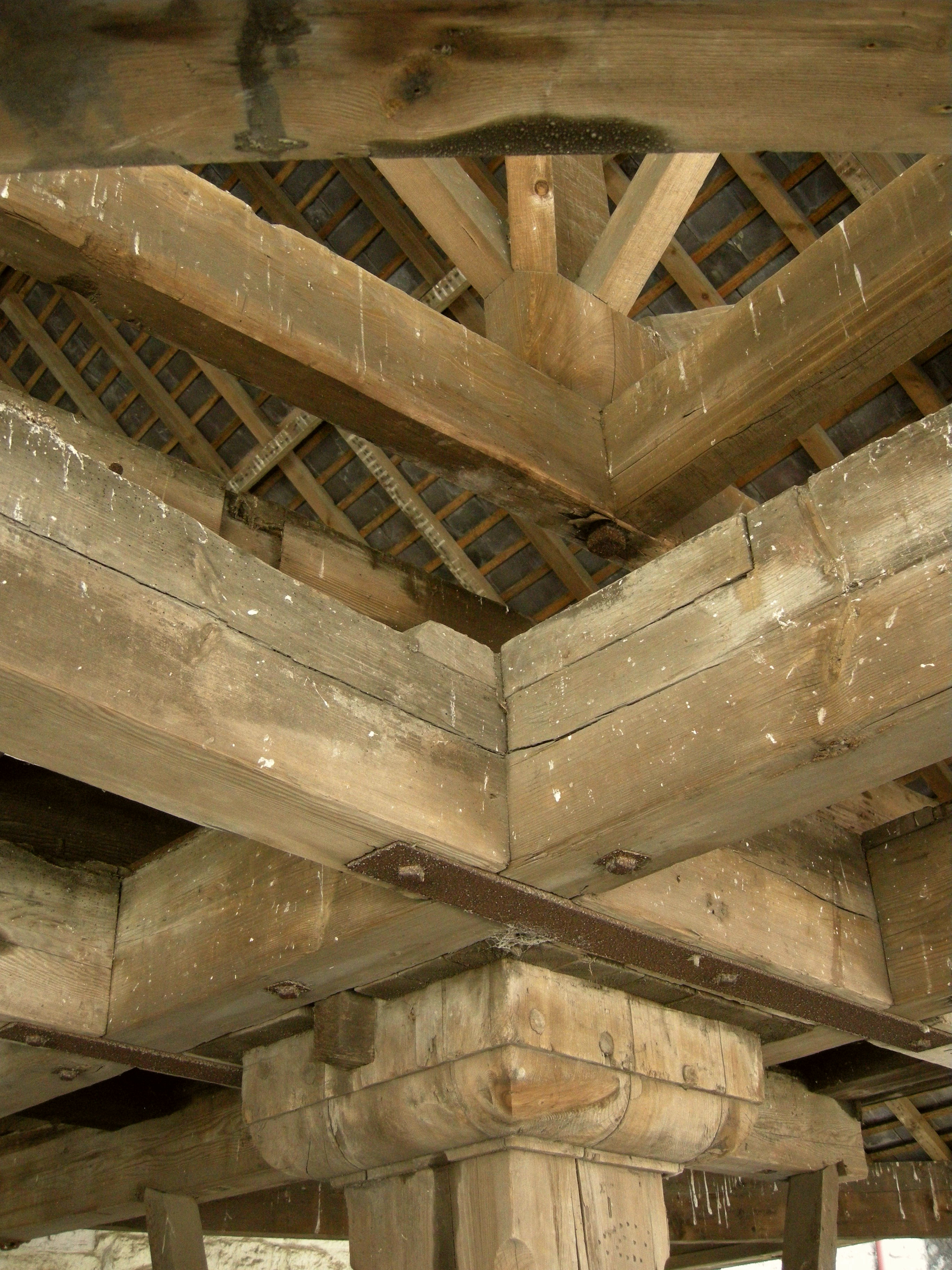
View showing that roof truss and mill are separate. Top set is roof truss; bottom set is beams supporting (hidden) main horizontal gear wheel of mill. Tie beam supporting top mill axle pivot is just visible between roof truss and mill

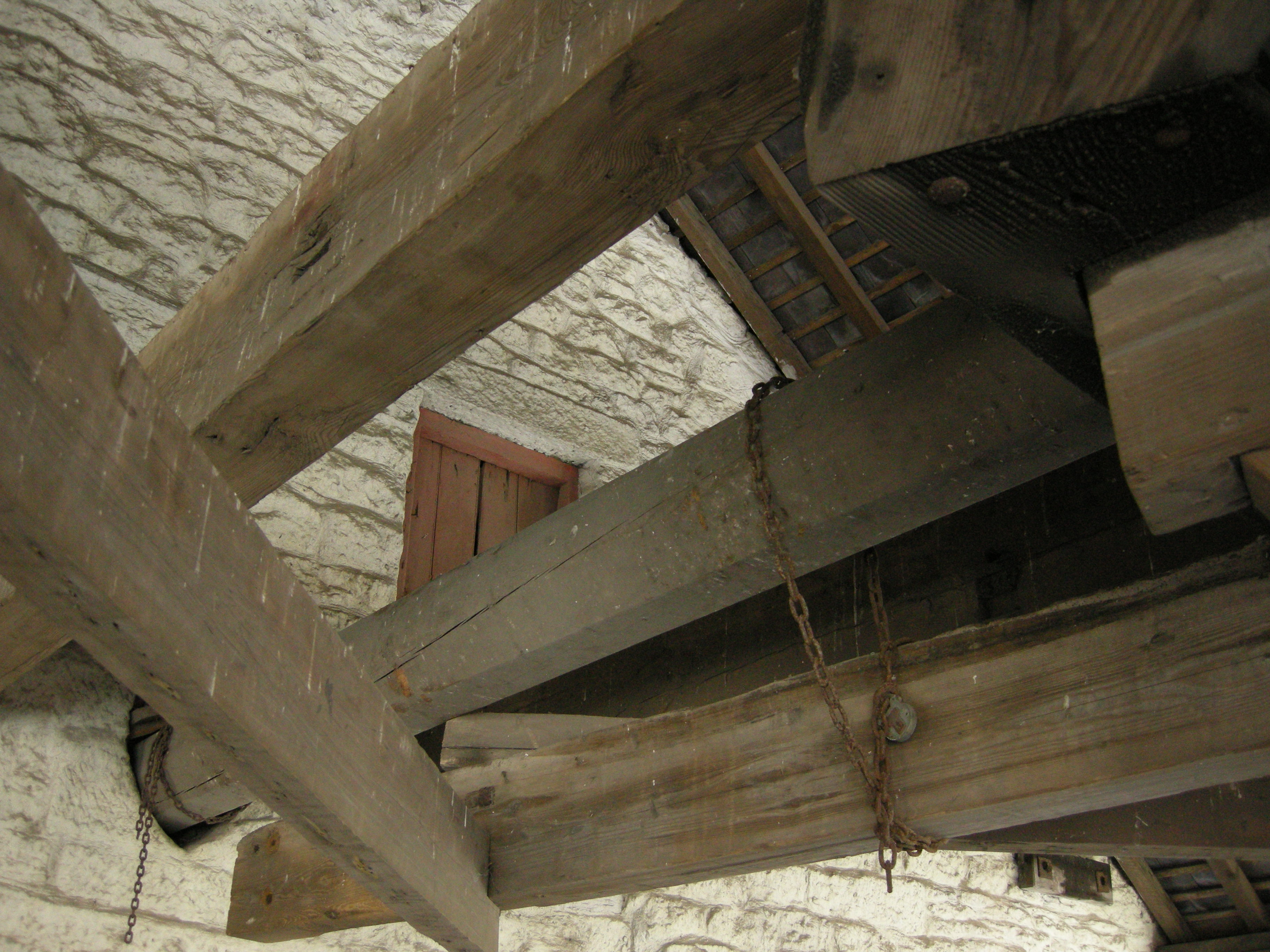
Massive oak drive shaft of mill passing through wall of threshing barn, supported on both sides by two heavy oak beams fixed between the mill's own tie beam and the threshing barn wall

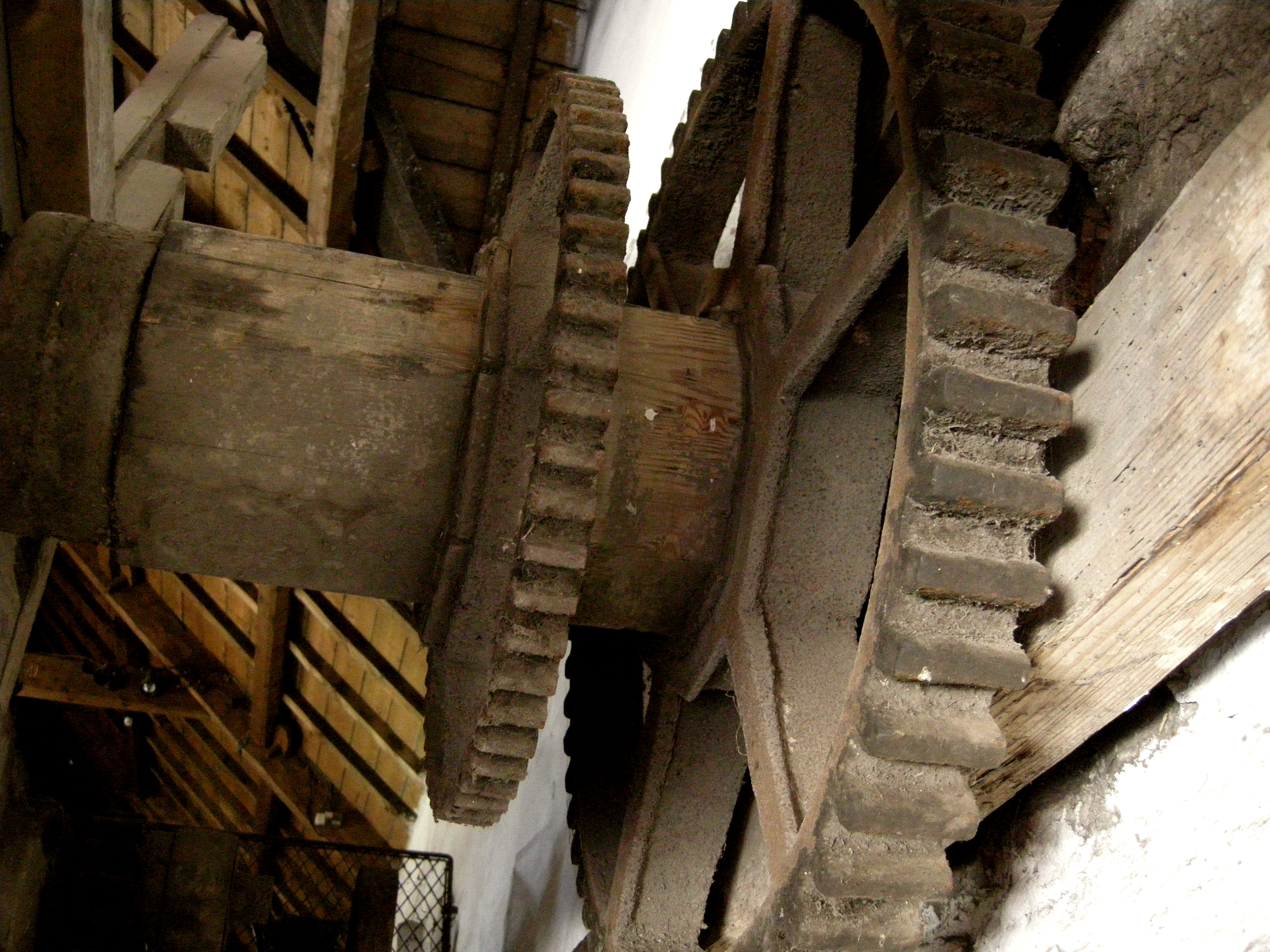
Inside threshing barn: gear wheels on end of drive shaft, where further gears and drive belts would be attached for driving various machines

=== Horse mill ===
The Beamish gin gang and its in−situ horse mill have not been used since the 1830s when portable engines superseded it. The gin gang survived because its original mill was removed and it was converted for other uses. The present mill was brought by the museum from Berwick Mills Low Farm in Northumberland. The museum has repaired and installed it as a museum exhibit, but it is not currently fit for purpose. The top of the mill's main vertical axle and the end of the main drive shaft are pivoted at the centre of their own separate tie beam, which is below and parallel with the main roof tie beam and set in the gin gang's side walls at either end. The mill's tie beam has to be stabilised with two massive oak beams which run, either side of the drive shaft, from tie beam to barn wall. A large and basic engine like this can create great stresses from the torque engendered.

== See also ==
- Horse mill
- List of horse mills
- Threshing machine
