= L'Espérance (newspaper) =

Defunft Guinean newspaper

L'Espérance ('The Hope') was a newspaper published in Guinea, appearing in the period shortly after the relaxation of Guinean press laws in 1993. The newspaper was published by the Guinean Red Cross. By 1995 publication of the newspaper was discontinued.
