= Don L'Esperance =

American politician (1919–2008)

Donald A. L'Esperance (December 1, 1919 – December 6, 2008) was an American politician.

== Early life and education ==
Donald L'Esperance was born to parents Joseph and Katherine L'Esperance on December 1, 1919. He graduated from Rapid City High School in 1938 and remained in his hometown for college.

== Career ==
L'Esperance began his career as a bookkeeper at Independent Bindery between 1940 and 1941, then moved to Kenosha Transport as an office manager until 1942, after which he was an administrative assistant for the United States Army Corps of Engineers through 1944. L'Esperance started working for Mellgren Plumbing as an office manager in 1949, and by his retirement in 1986, had become a partner and owner. Between 1954 and 1963, L'Esperance was founding director of Pennco Investments.

== Politics and public service ==
L'Esperance was a member of the Rapid City Council from 1953 to 1956. In the later two years of his council term, he was also mayor of Rapid City, and the second-youngest person to assume the mayoralty. From 1957 to 1962, L'Esperance served on the South Dakota House of Representatives as a Republican legislator. In 1974, L'Esperance began a three-year term as chairman and president of the Rapid City Regional Hospital.

== Death ==
L'Esperance died on December 6, 2008, at the Clarkson Mt. View Nursing Facility.
