= HMS Esperance =

Two ships of the Royal Navy have borne the name HMS Esperance, after espérance, the French term for 'hope':

- HMS Esperance (1626) was a sloop captured in 1626 and given away in 1632.
- HMS Esperance (1795) was launched in 1781 in America, became a slave ship sailing from Liverpool, and then a privateer, was captured four times in two years, and on the last capture (in 1795 from the French), became a 16-gun sloop of the Royal Navy until sold in 1798.
