= Horse mill =

Type of mill powered by horses

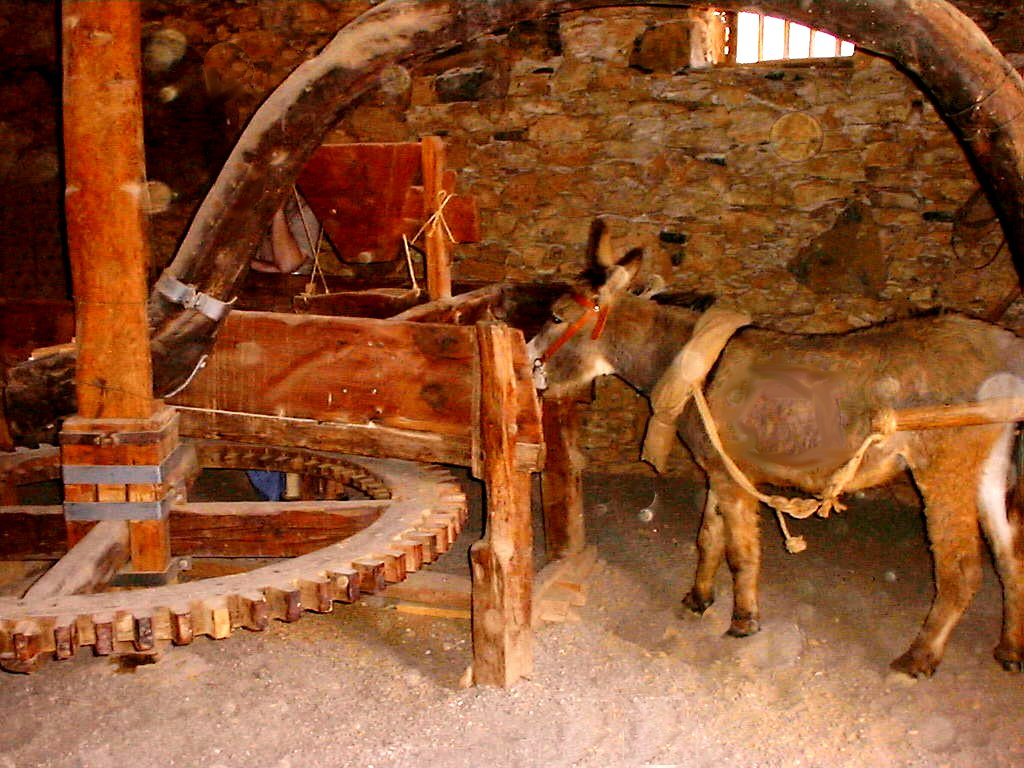
Donkey mill at La Alcogida Ecomuseum in Fuerteventura

A horse mill (or in the UK commonly called a horse-gin - short for "engine") is a mill, sometimes used in conjunction with a watermill or windmill, that uses a horse engine as the power source. Any milling process can be powered in this way, but the most frequent use of animal power in horse mills was for grinding grain and pumping water. Other animal engines for powering mills are powered by dogs, donkeys, oxen or camels. Treadwheels are engines powered by humans.

== History ==
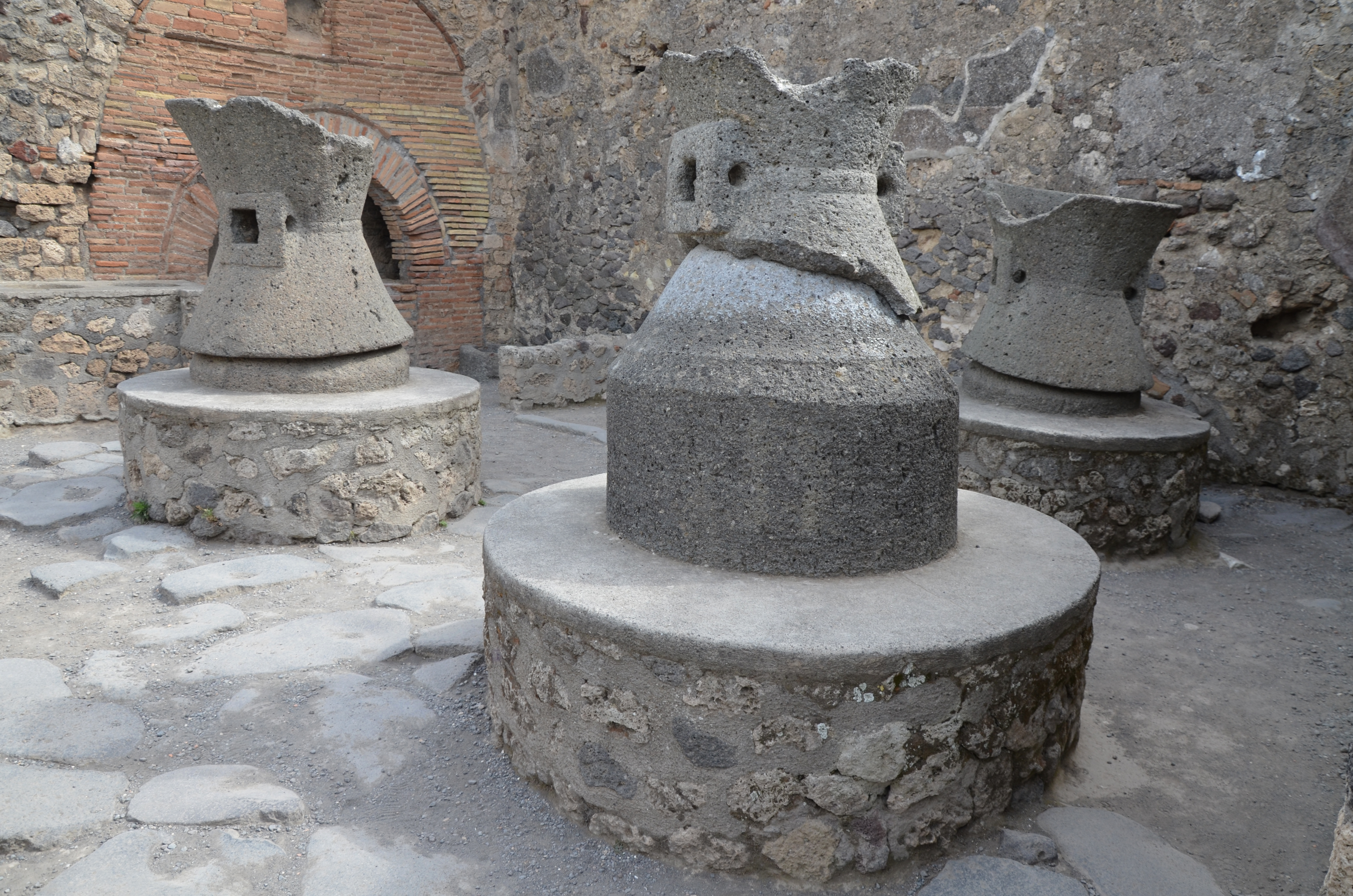
Horse or donkey-powered stone mills at Pompeii.

The donkey or horse-driven rotary mill was a 4th-century BC Carthaginian invention, with possible origins in Carthaginian Sardinia. Two Carthaginian animal-powered millstones built using red lava from Carthaginian-controlled Mulargia in Sardinia were found in a 375–350 BC shipwreck near Mallorca. The mill spread to Sicily, arriving in Italy in the 3rd century BC. The Carthaginians used hand-powered rotary mills as early as the 6th century BC, and the use of the rotary mill in Spanish lead and silver mines may have contributed to the rise of the larger, animal-powered mill. It freed the miller from most of the heavy burden of his task and greatly increased output through the superior stamina of horses and donkeys over humans.

== Gallery ==
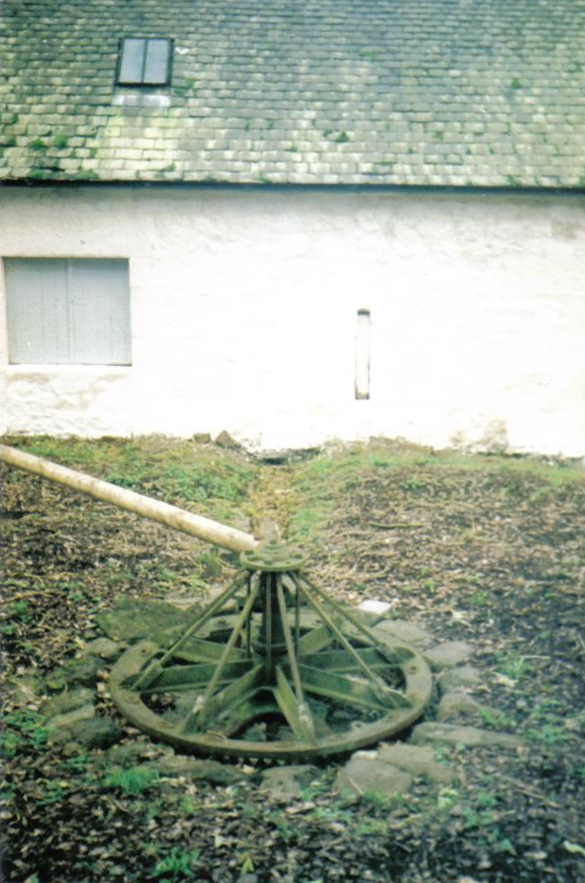
The Horse Mill at Wester Kittochside Farm near Glasgow

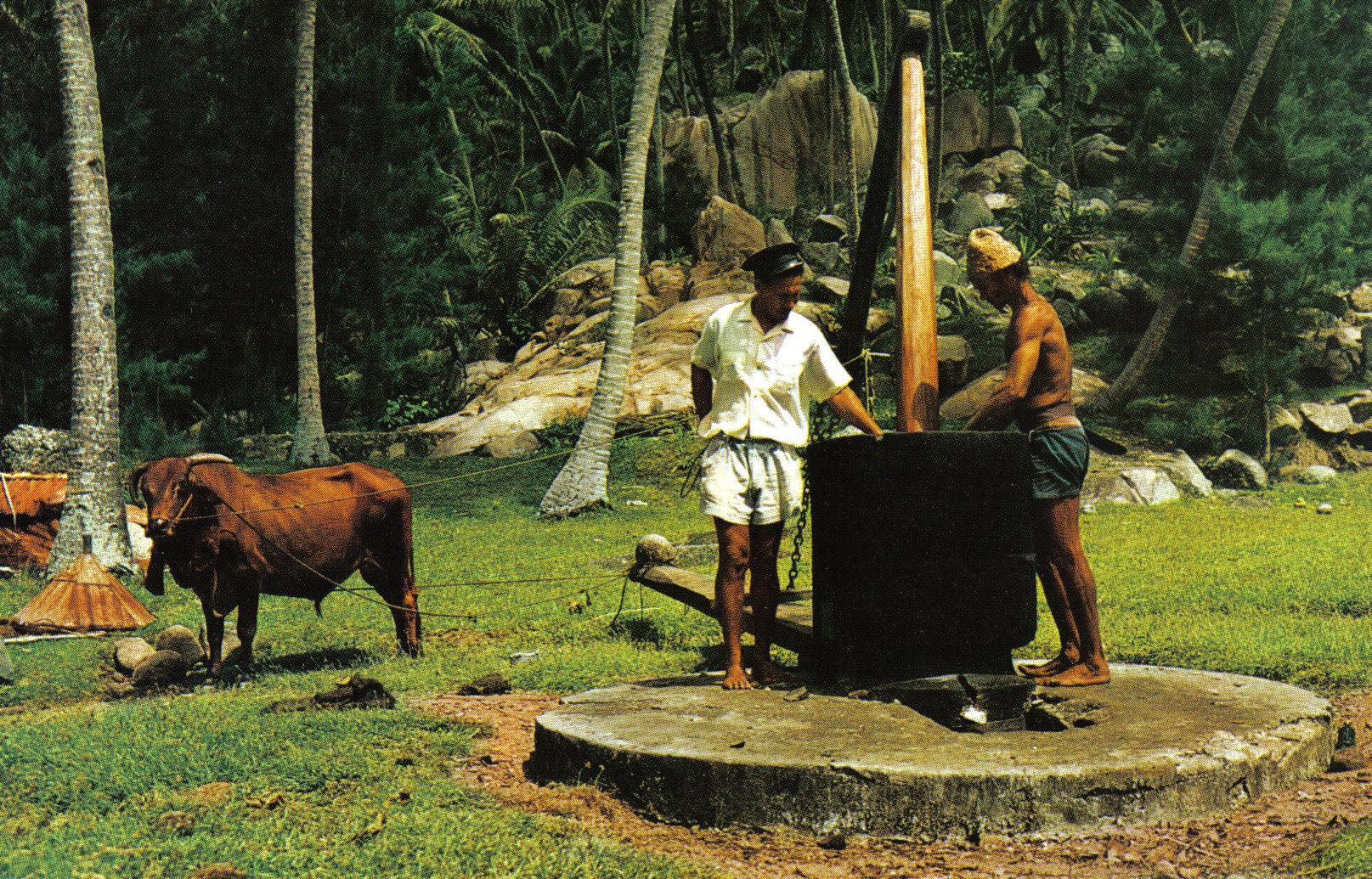
A bullock-powered mill, Seychelles

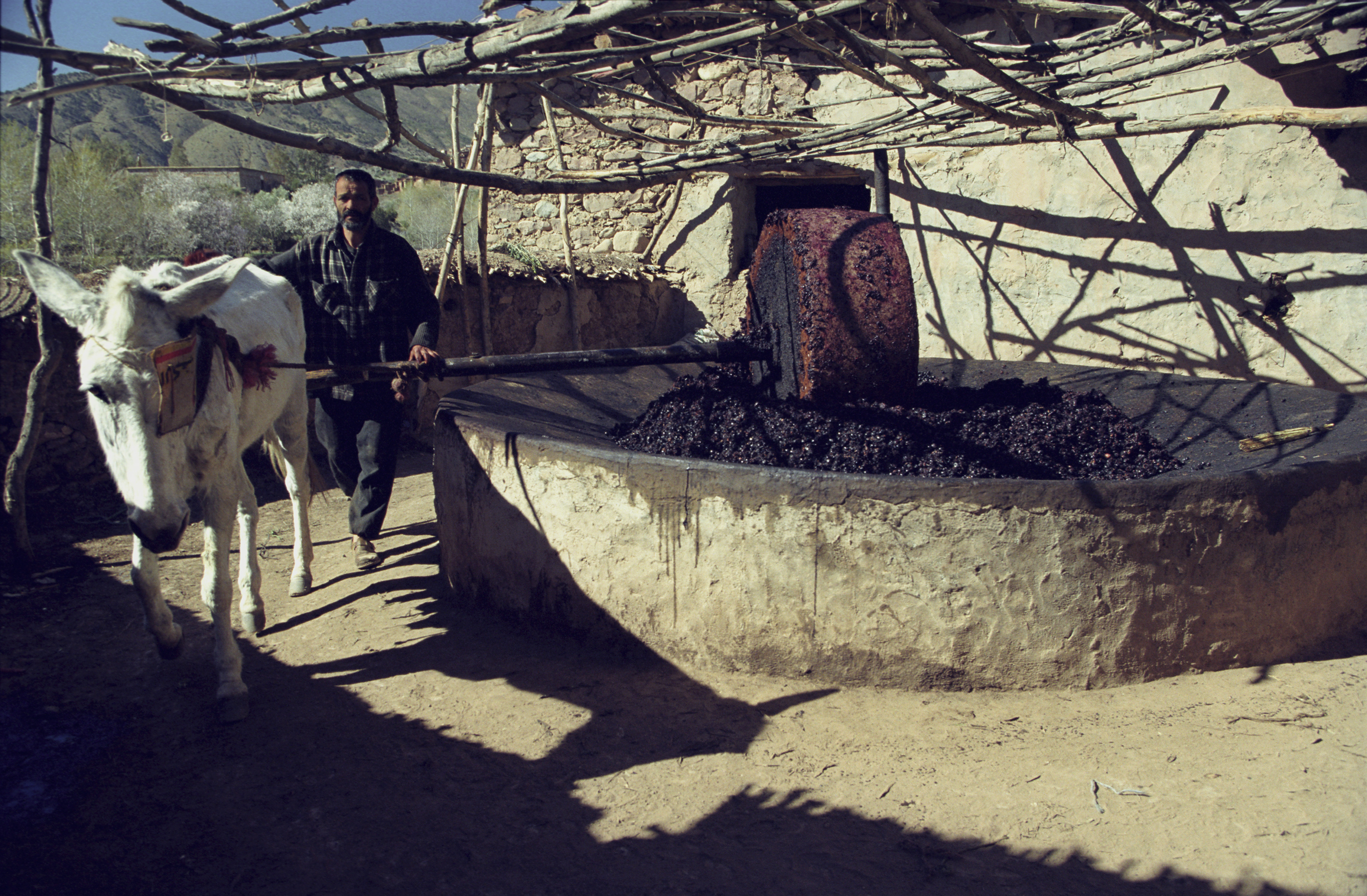
The olive grinding mill, High Atlas (Morocco)

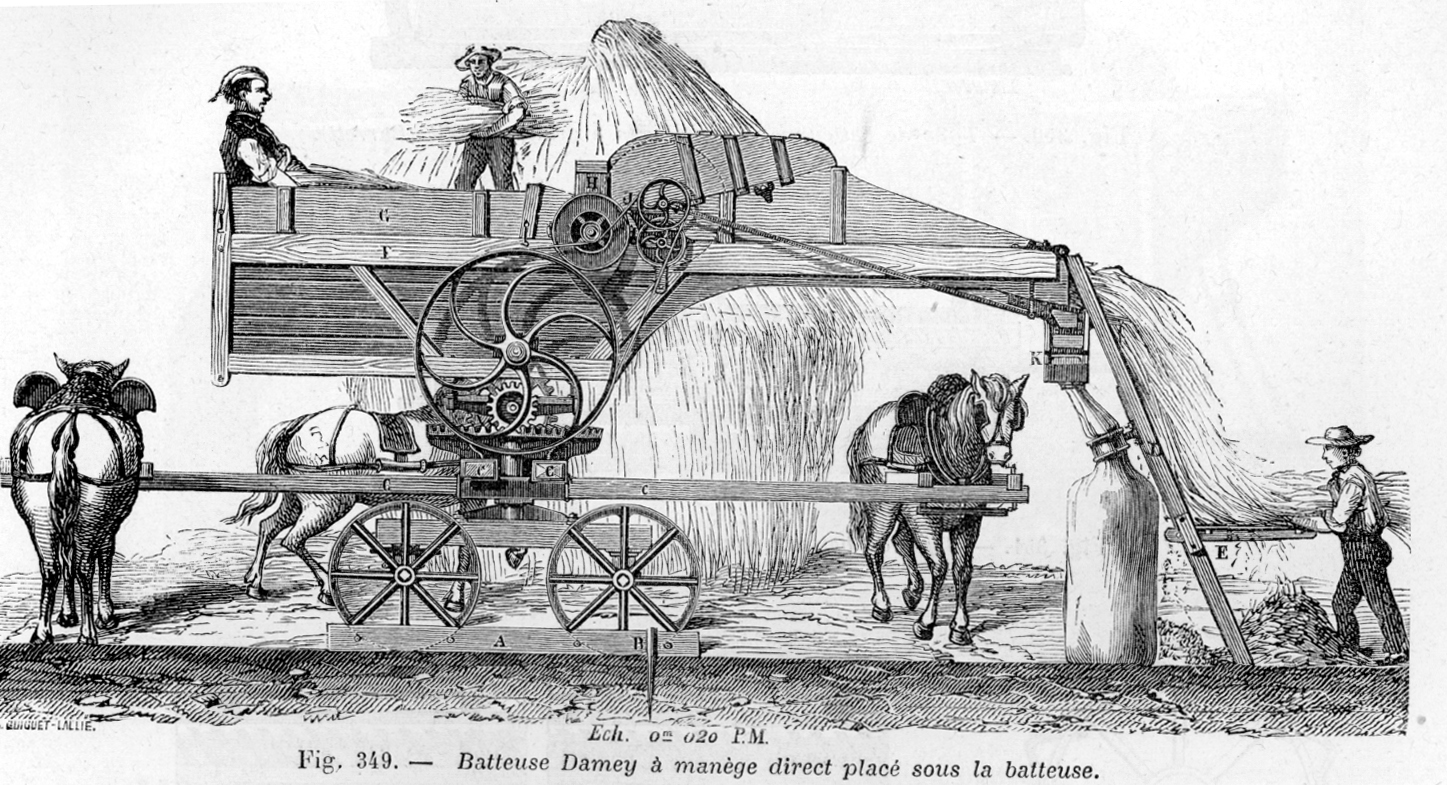
A horse-powered threshing machine.
The horse and harness nearest the viewer have been omitted to show the machinery.

The Gin by Richard Samuel Chattock

== Horse mill at Beamish Museum ==
This horse mill has not been used since about 1830 when it was superseded by portable engines. It was rescued from Berwick Hills Low Farm in Northumberland by the museum, repaired and set up in their own gin gang at Home Farm as a non-functioning exhibit. The top of the mill's main vertical axle and the end of the main drive shaft are pivoted at the centre of their own separate tie beam which is below and parallel with the main roof tie beam, and set in the gin gang's side walls at either end. The mill's tie beam has to be stabilised with two massive oak beams which run, either side of the drive shaft, from tie beam to threshing barn wall. A large and basic engine like this can create great stresses from the torque engendered.

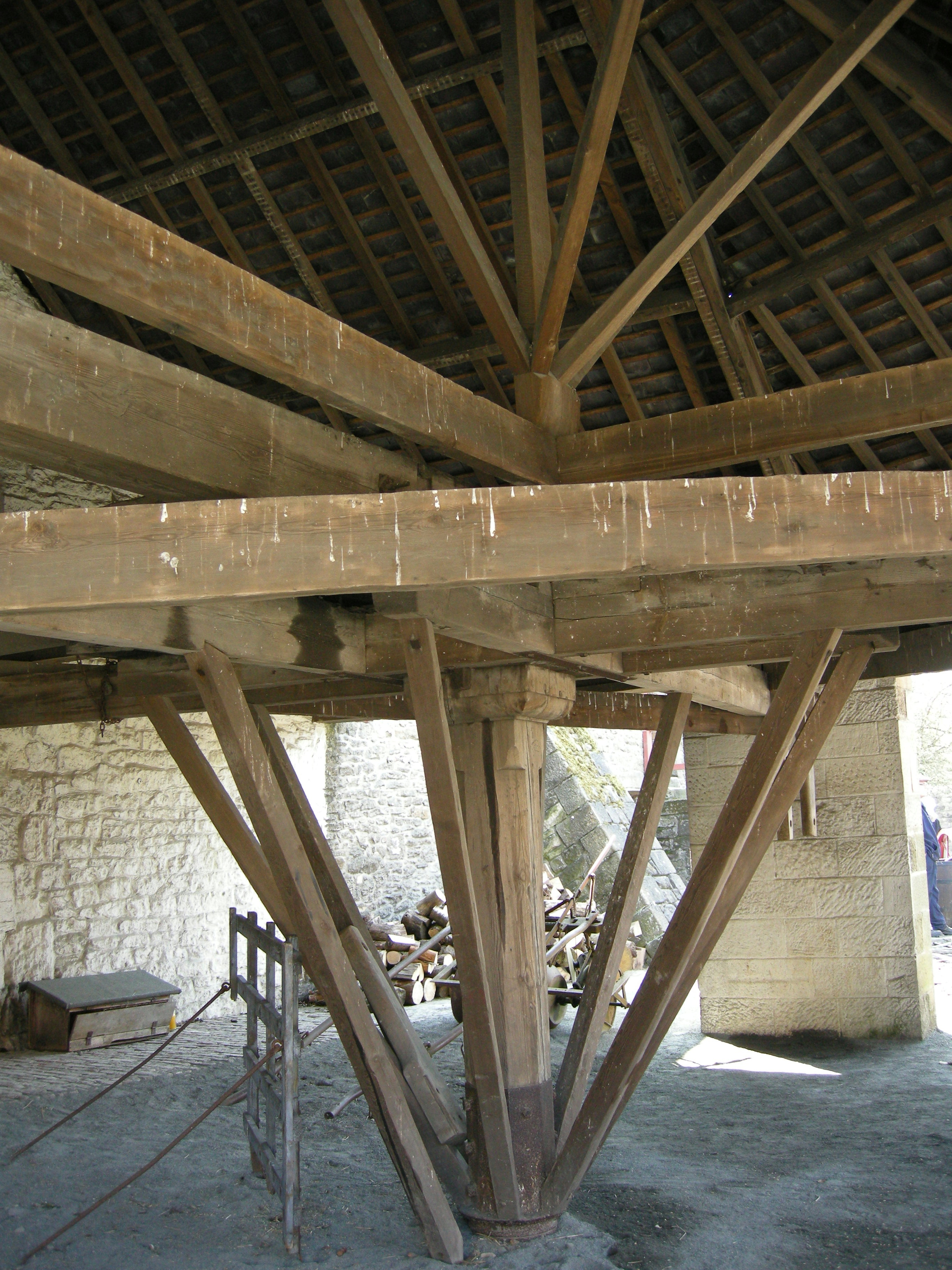
Main axle of mill. Roof truss above is separate; mill's own tie beam visible between.

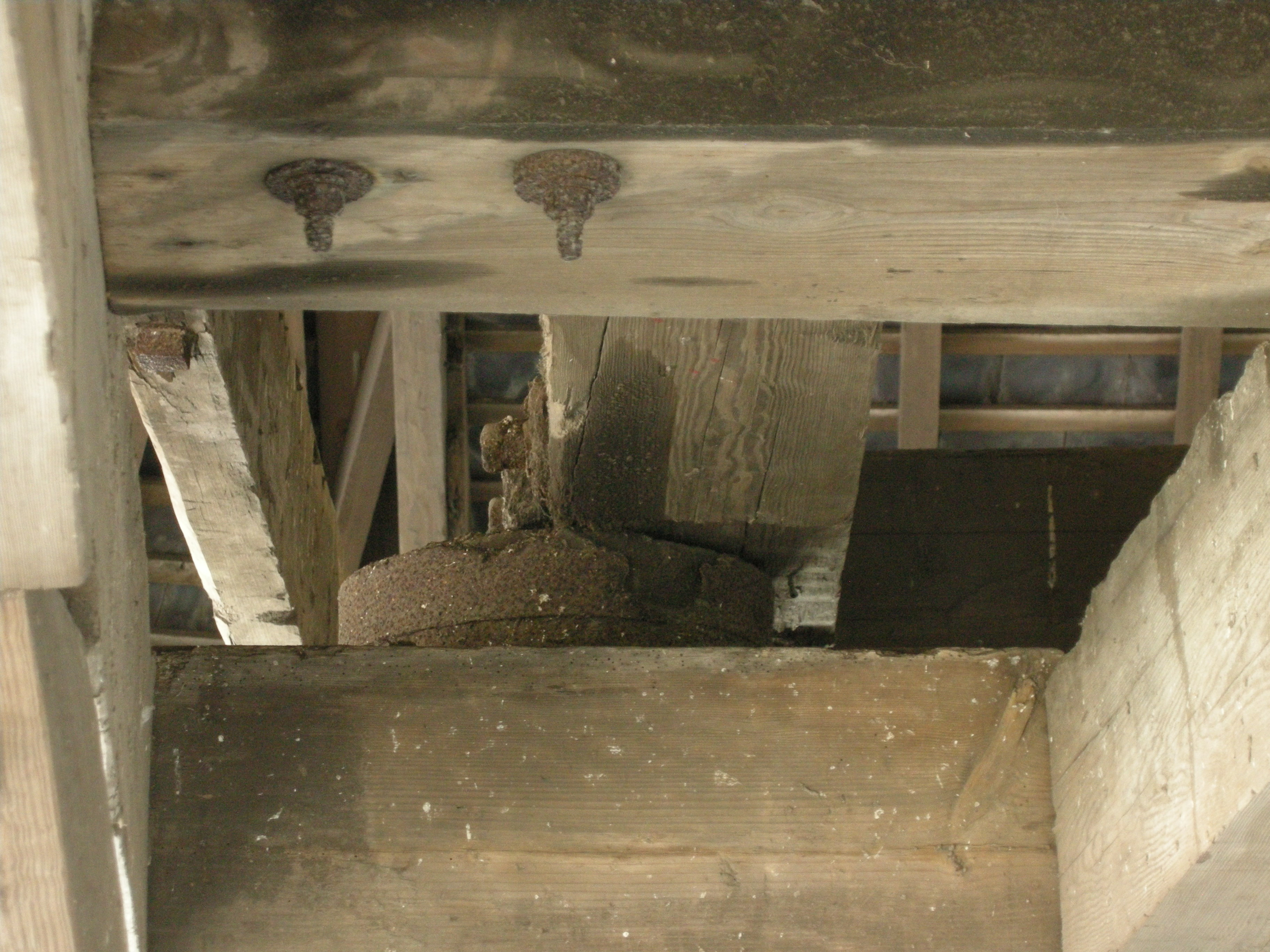
Housing for top pivot of main axle, bolted to its own tie beam, separate from roof truss (visible above)

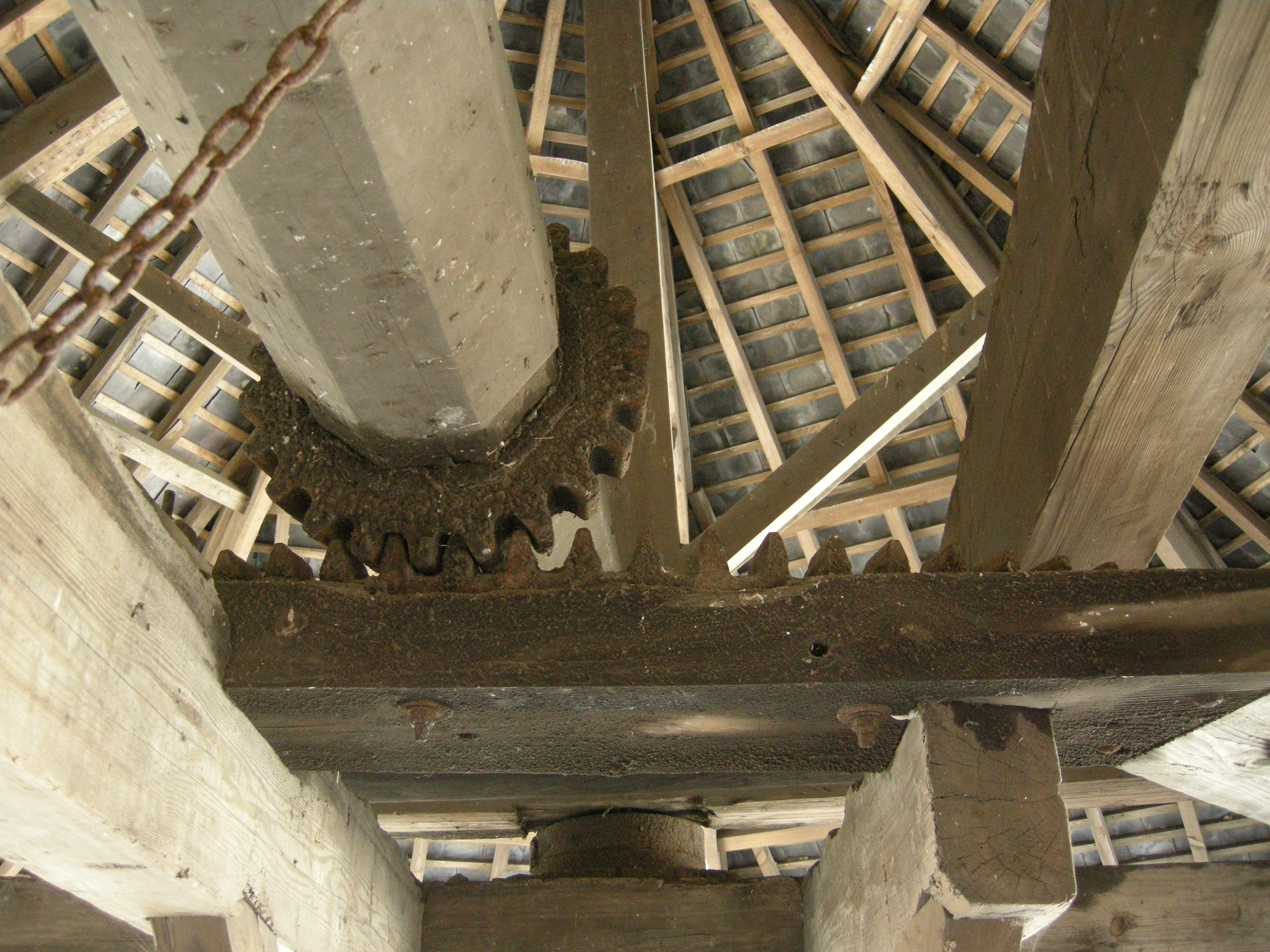
Drive shaft gear resting on main horizontal gear wheel which is attached to top of main vertical axle of mill

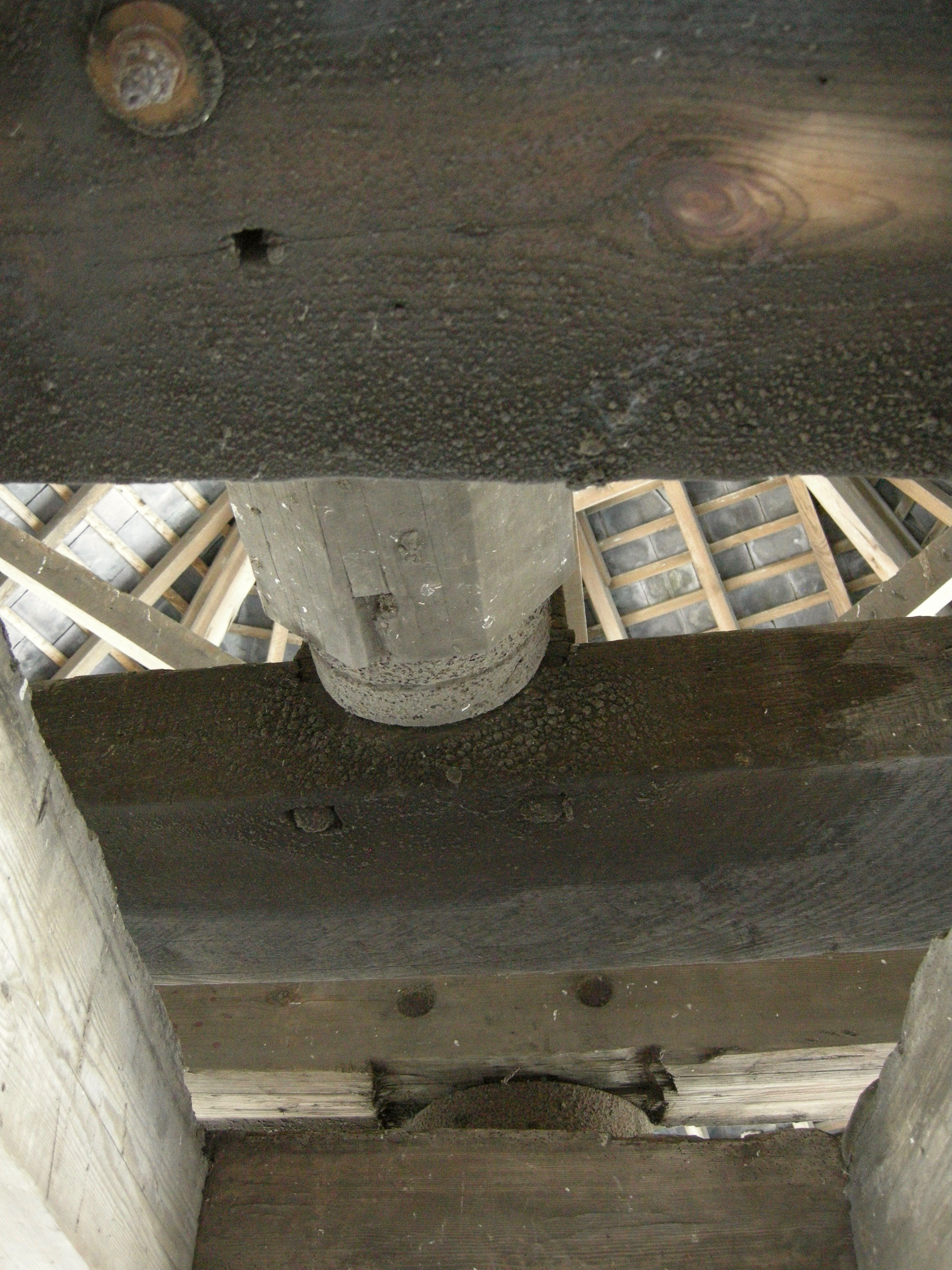
The two pivots: end of drive shaft (centre) and top of main axle (behind)

=== Mill construction ===
This four-horse mill is based on a central, vertical, heavy, 10 feet (3.0 m) high, oak axle, with its base pivoting on an iron framework set in the middle of the gin gang floor. Its top end pivots under the mill's own tie beam (if it didn't, it would fall over) but the tie beam cannot rest on the pivot, or the mill would not turn. The main axle supports around its top end the main, 6 feet (1.8 m)-diameter, horizontal gear wheel, with the teeth on the top surface. The main drive shaft, a massive oak pole, is girthed at one end by a secondary gear wheel which lies on the main gear wheel, thus turning the main drive shaft on its long axis. The main drive shaft runs from the main gear wheel through a hole in the threshing barn wall and in the barn it powers the threshing machine and other machines via further cogwheels and belts. Such a machine would create great torque stresses, and if it were ever to work again it would require re-engineering to ensure smooth and safe running, and beams which are seasoned and not cracked.

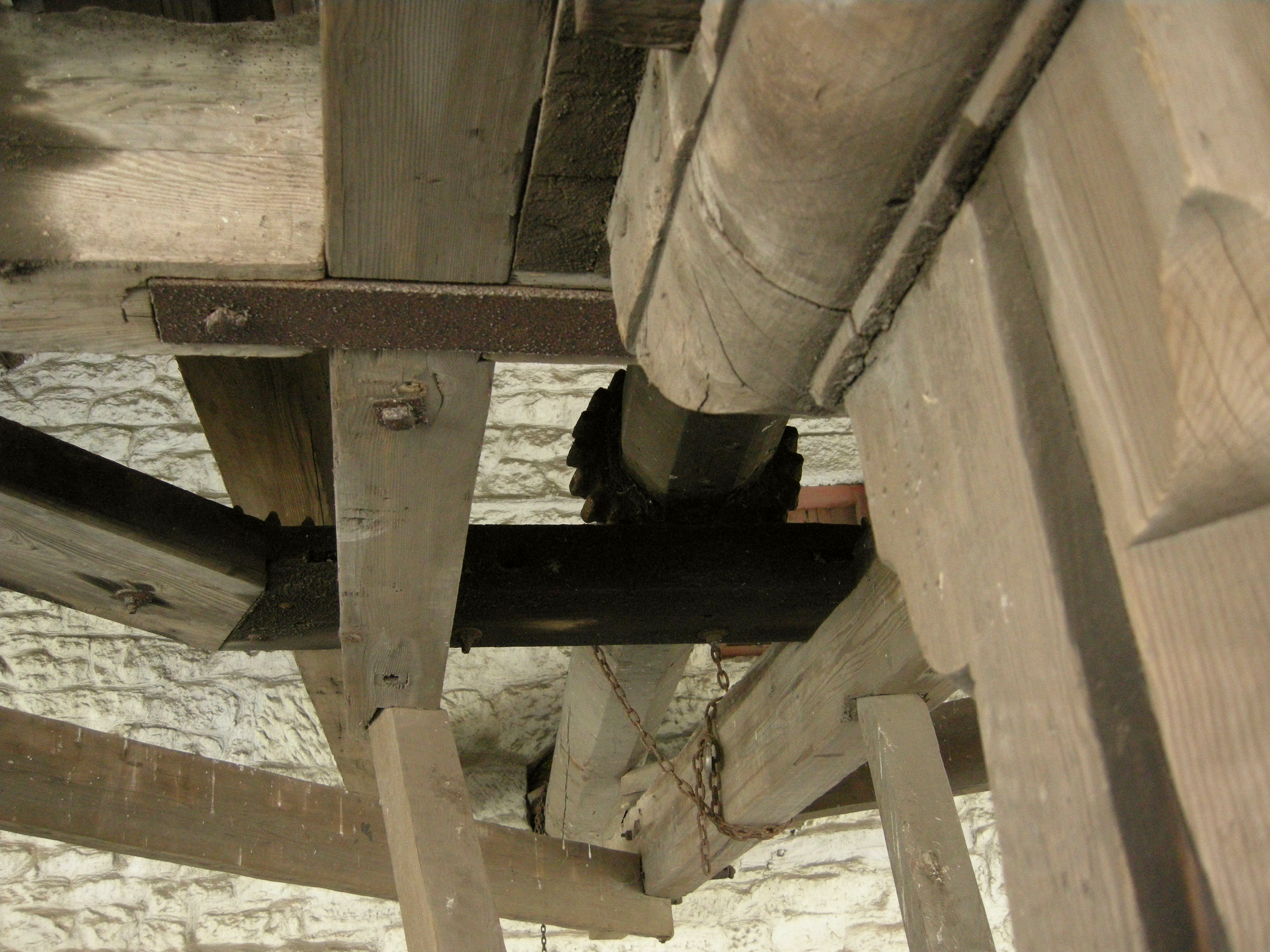
Main horizontal gear wheel at top of main axle, with drive shaft gear wheel on it. Drive shaft transfers power through threshing barn wall.

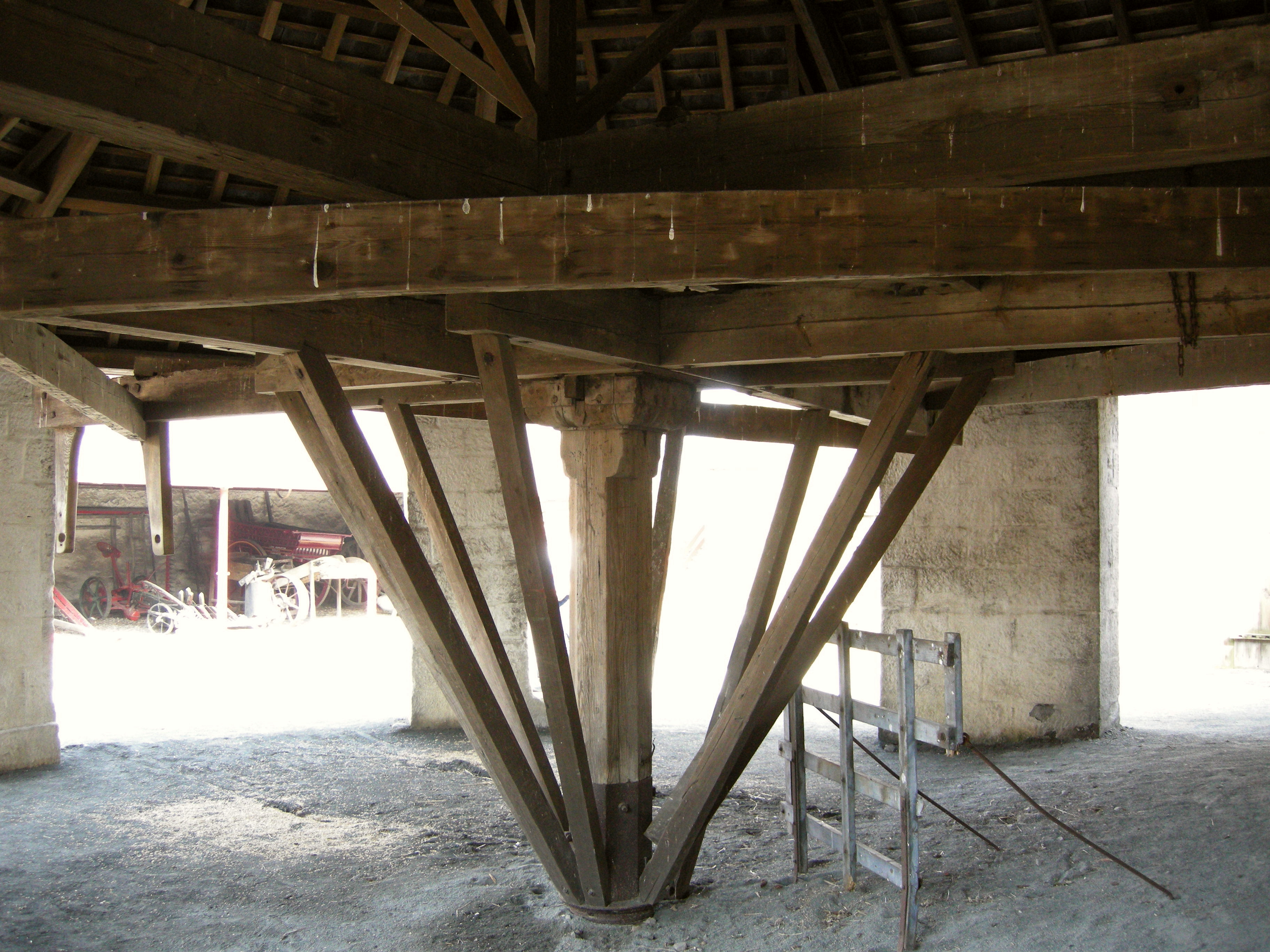
Horse shaft fixed to one of four long beams, all braced to each other with stretchers, and each fixed to the side of the top of the main axle.

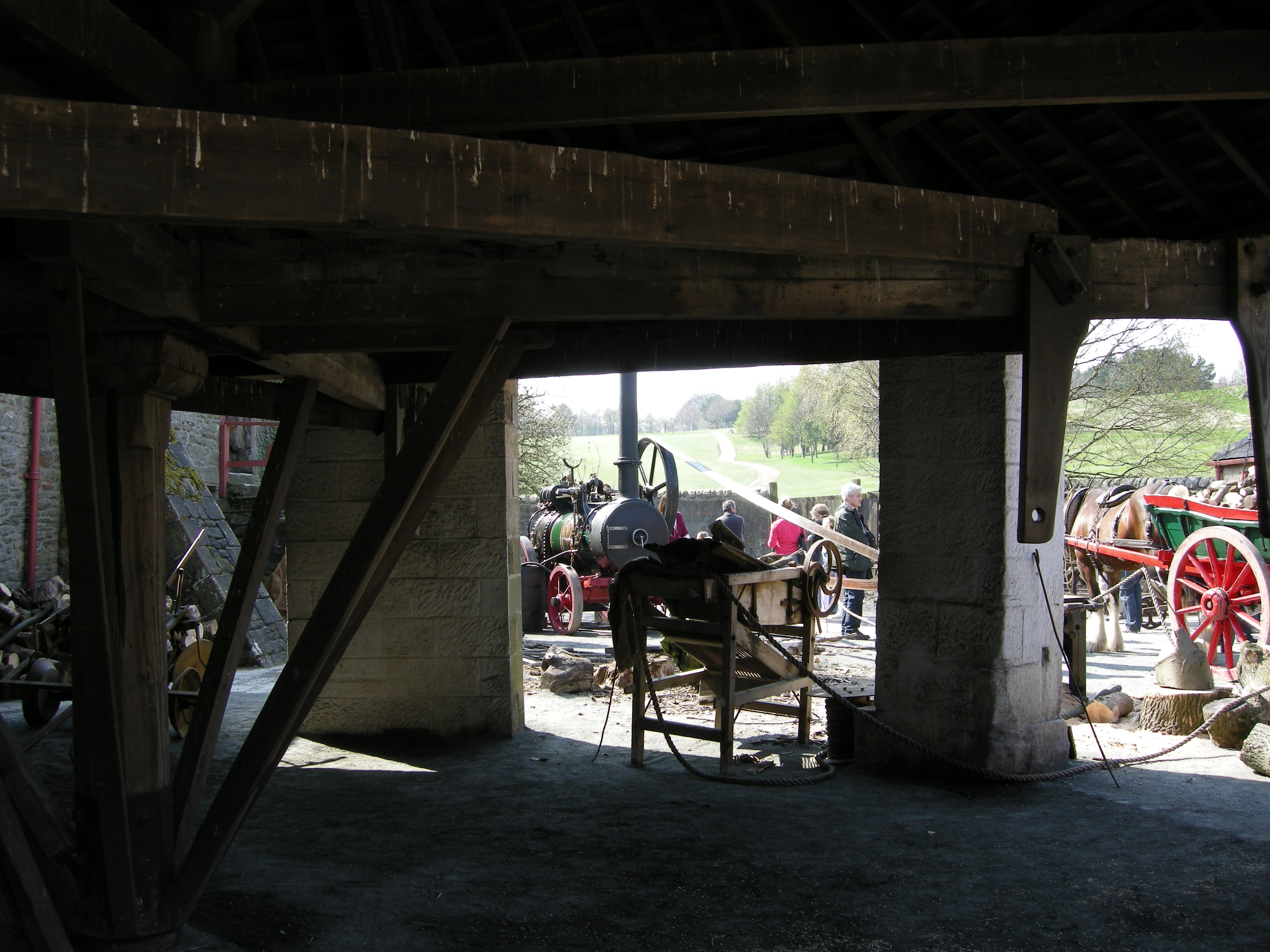
One of four long beams, each with horse shaft hanging from it.

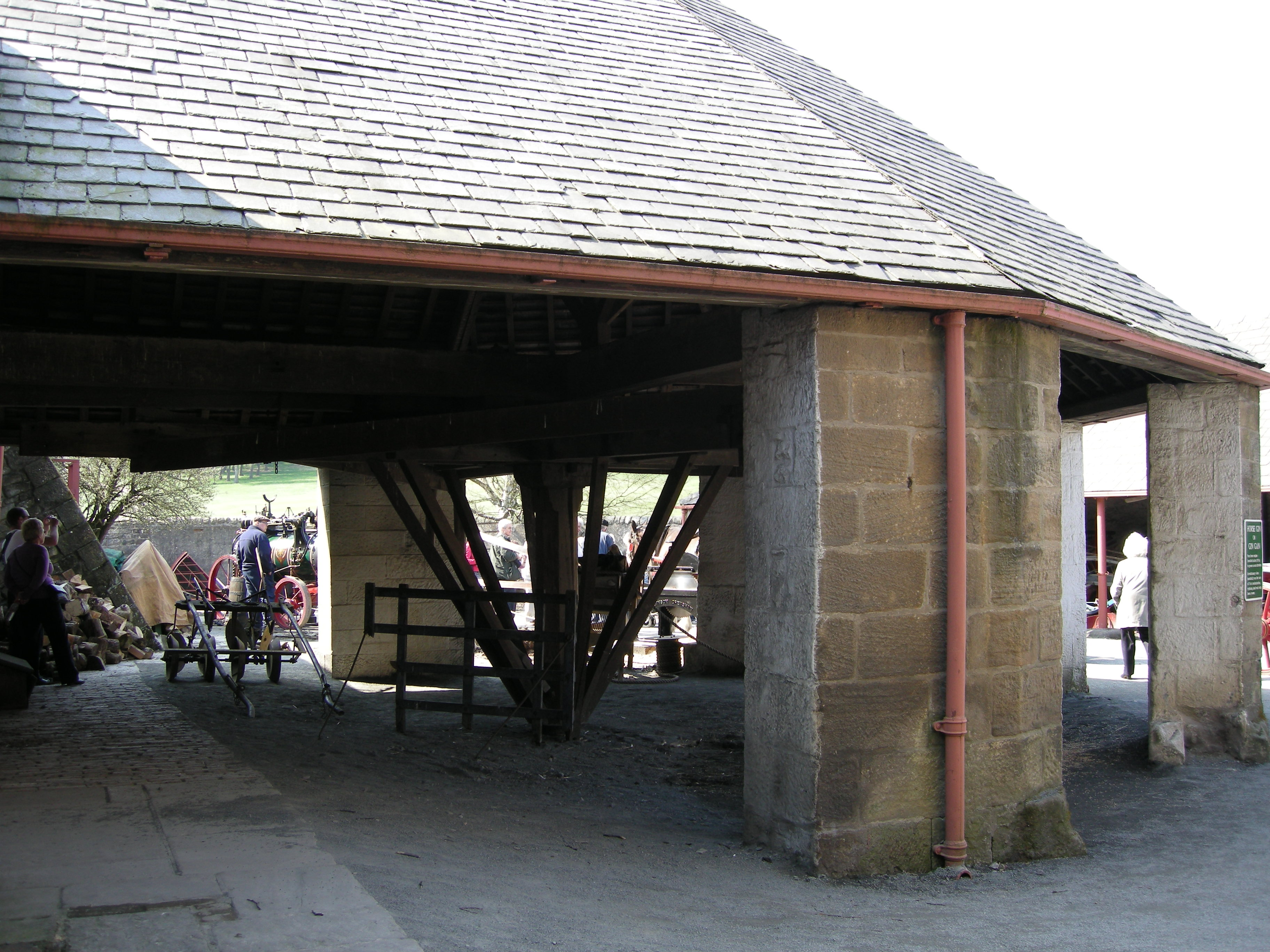
A four-horse mill requires a large working space

=== Horse power ===
This is a powerful horse mill for four horses; probably English ponies, as modern heavy horses were not yet fully bred in the 1830s. Each of the four heavy oak beams connecting the central axle to the four horse shafts runs from beside the axle to the under-surface of the main gear wheel, and crosses the other three in a grid pattern between the axle and gear wheel, thus supporting the gear wheel and creating a rigid structure at the same time. They project for many feet beyond the main gear wheel, and require wooden stretchers to stabilise them. From the ends of these beams hang the horse shafts. The bottom ends of these shafts are quite low, which may indicate the use of ponies rather than early heavy horses.

== Horse gin at Nottingham Industrial Museum ==
A horse gin is on display at the Nottingham Industrial Museum. It was constructed in 1841 to sink the Langton Colliery shaft and moved in 1844 to Pinxton Green Colliery. It was still working in 1950 and it was erected in the museum in 1967. It was used at a pit head to raise coal to the surface. The Nottingham mines were shallow, coal was moved to the shaft on a sled, which was raised in a cage by a rope attached to a rope drum that was turned by the horses in the gin.

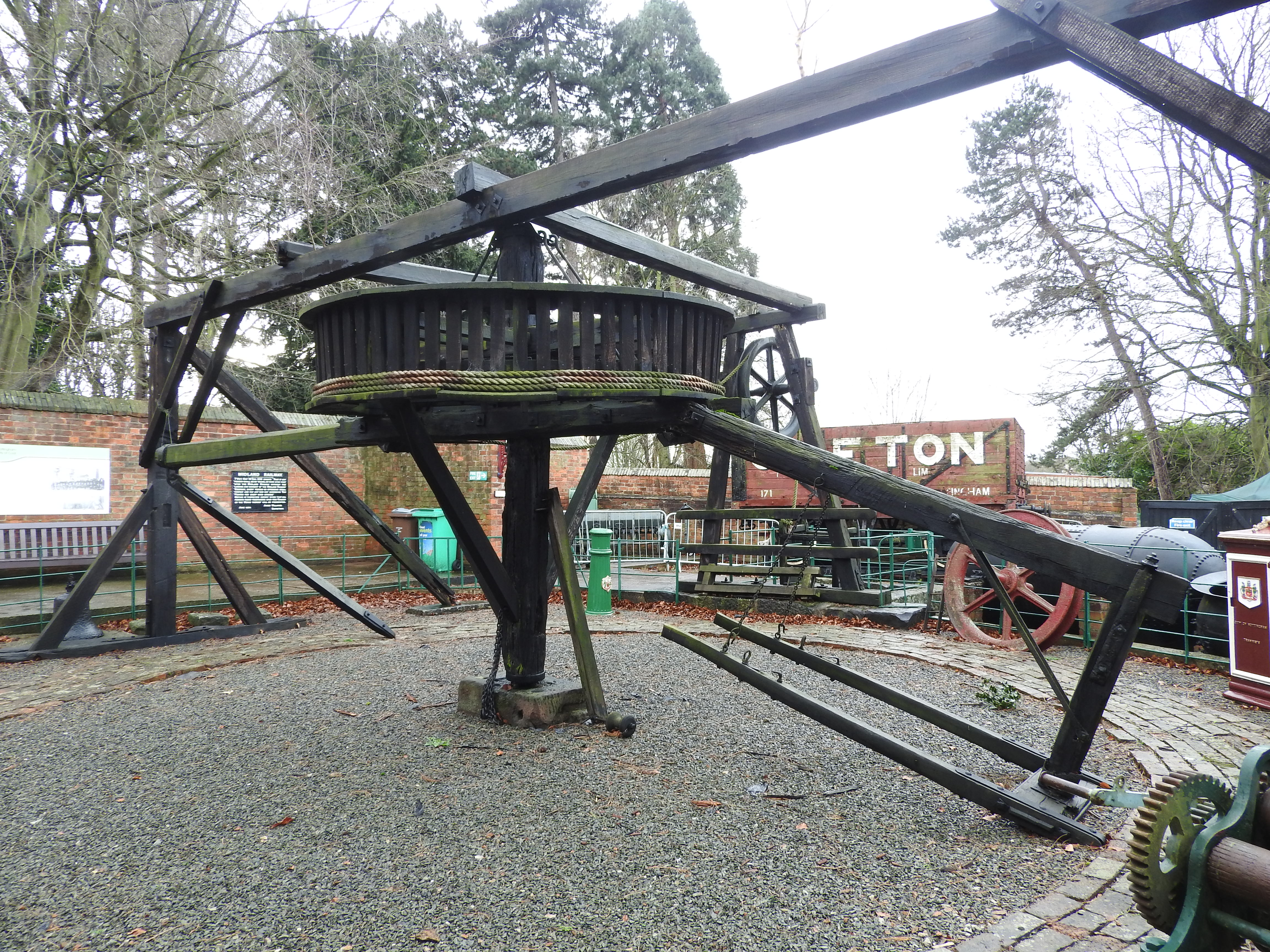
The 1841 Nottingham gin from Langton Colliery, Pinxton

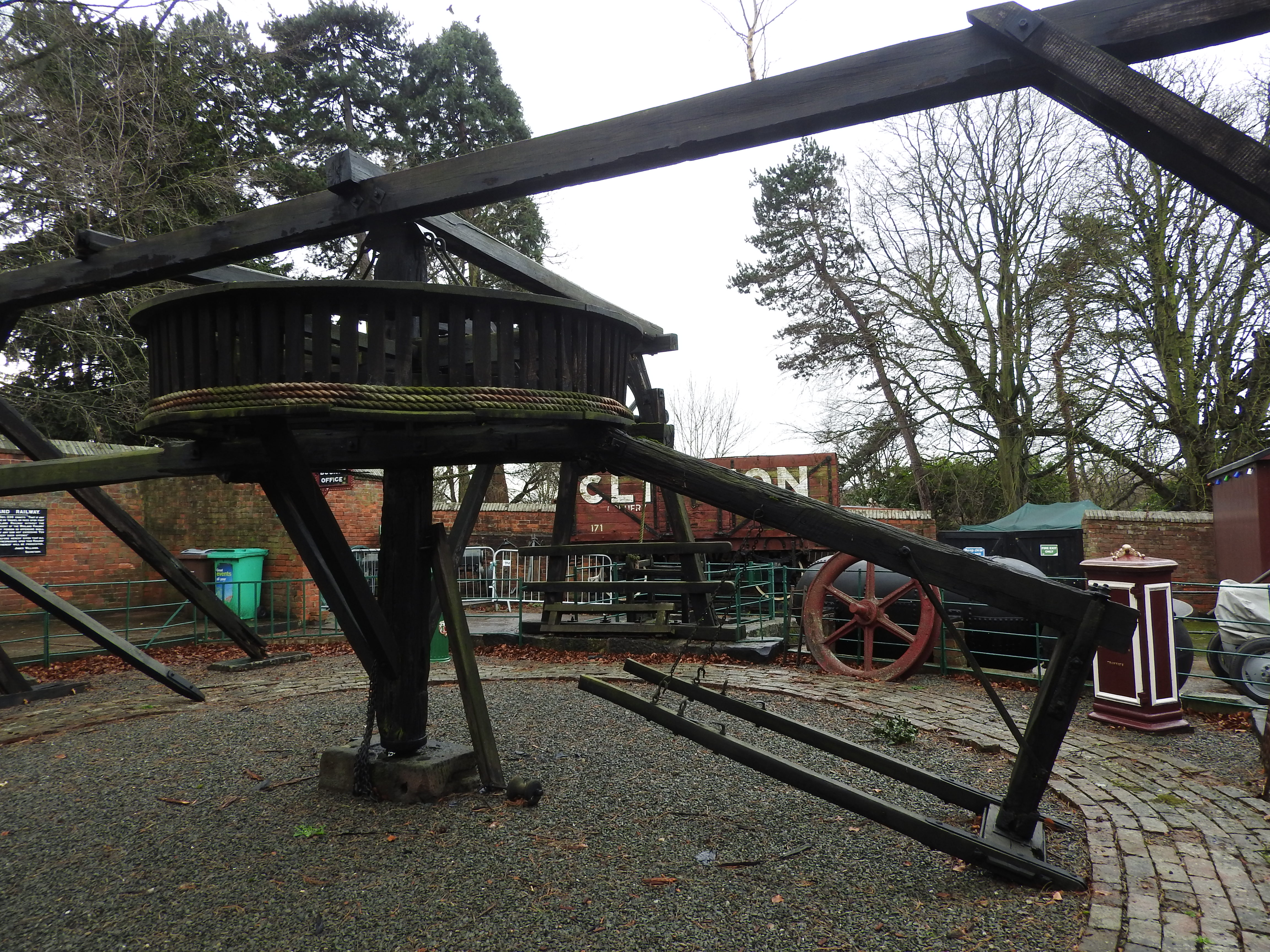
The Nottingham gin showing the rope drum

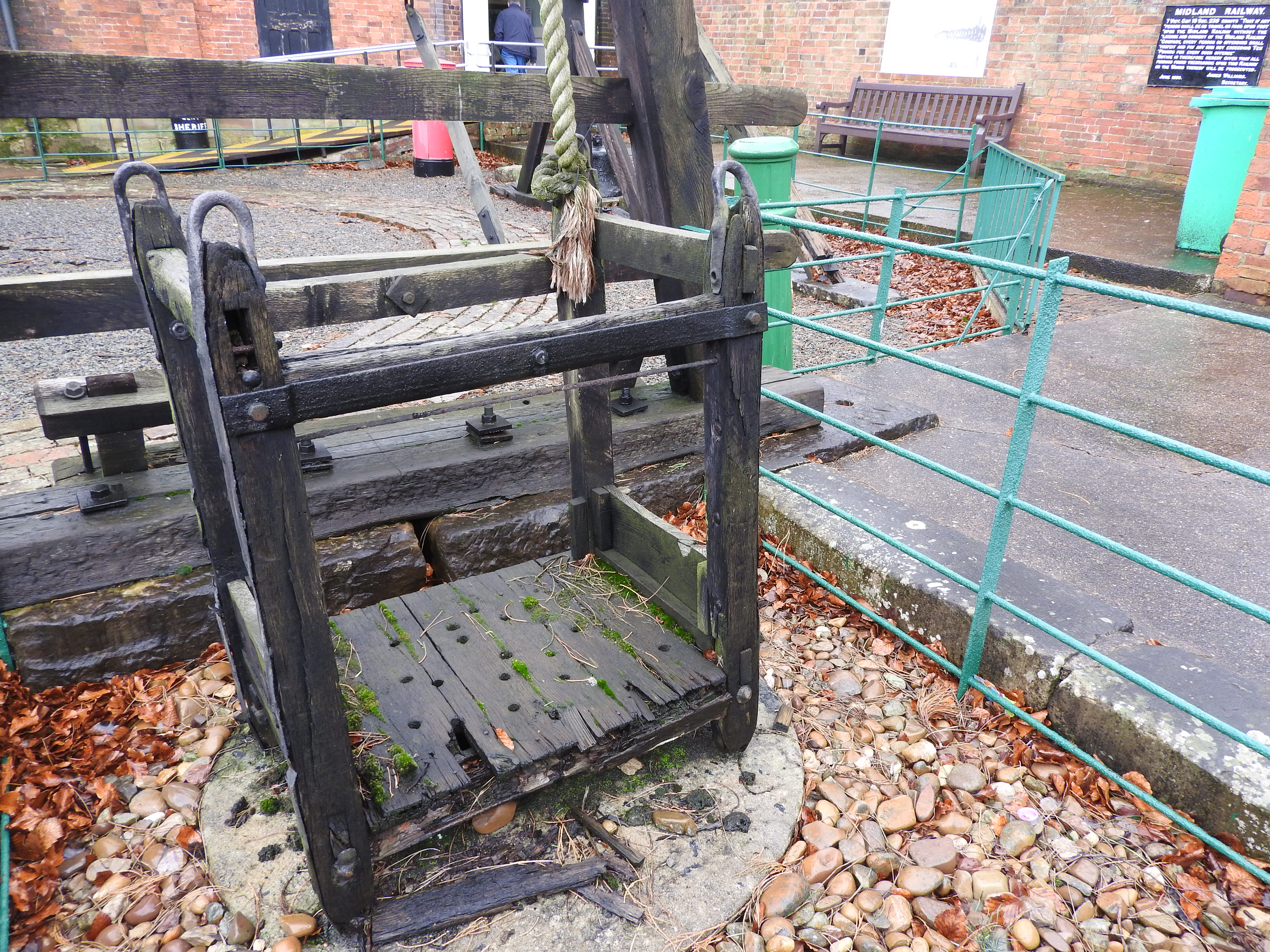
The Nottingham gin showing the raising cage

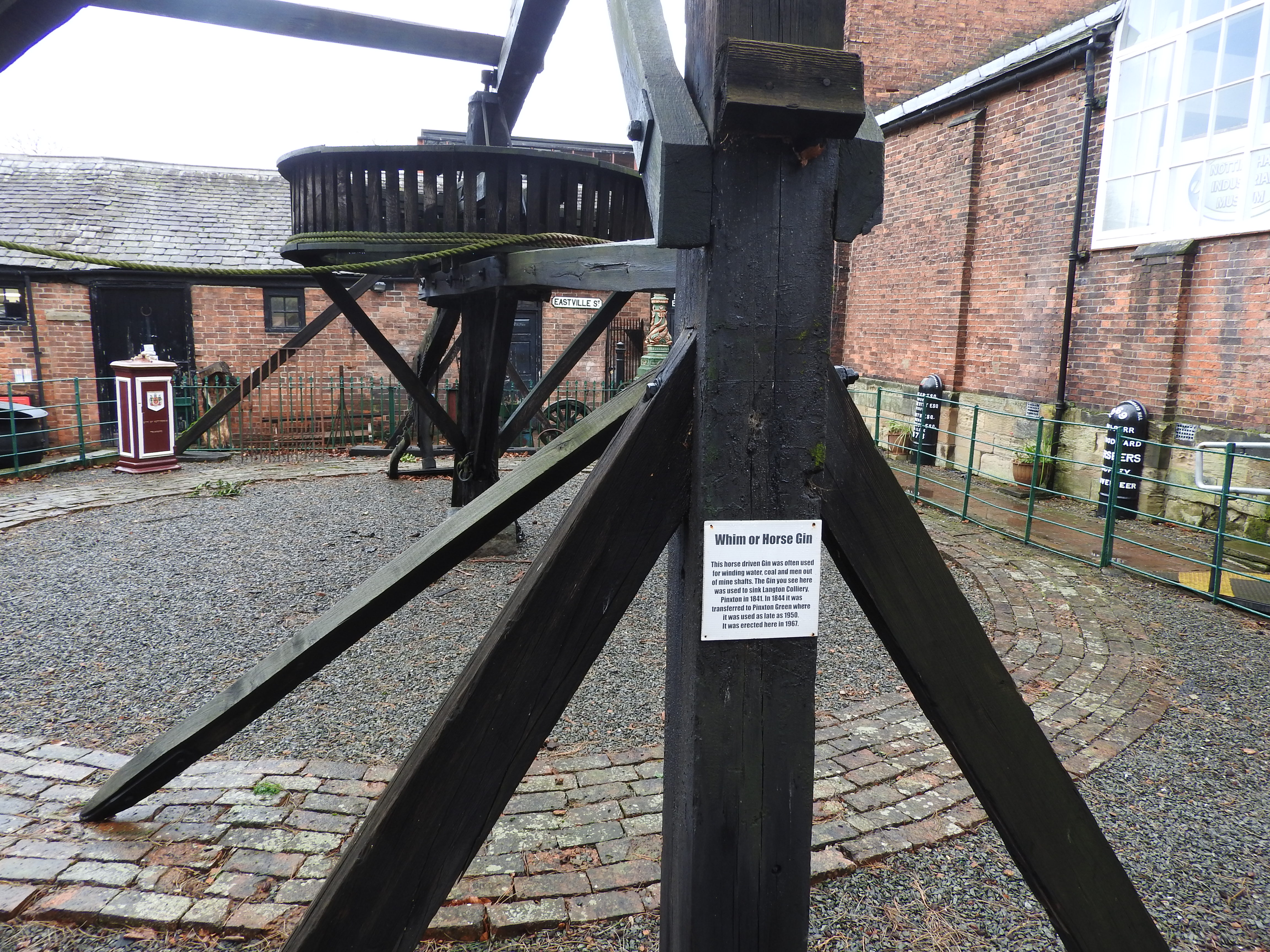
The Nottingham gin support

== Horse gins in the Black Country ==
Horse gins were a common sight in coal mining areas, and were often used where the coal was shallow, and there was no need to sink deep mine shafts. The gin was a wooden wheel device on a spindle that was pulled round by a horse. This then operated a simple pulley system that raised or lowered loads up and down the shaft. They were most prolific in the Ruiton farm area of the Black Country, which extended to Cotwallend Road. Horse 'gins' were also an extension of the one time illegal mining activities carried out particularly during the Miners' Strike of 1926. Miners dug out the coal from the shallow seam through a series of shallow "Bob Holes", hauling up the coal often in ordinary buckets to be transported away to be sold in the nearby village of Gornal. These activities were believed to have been the beginnings of Ellowes Colliery. The Earl of Dudley halted these activities and legalised them by giving permission for the coal to be mined on a royalty tonnage basis. The shallower coal was mined via the slope or "walking down" method (an extension of the "Bob Hole" method) using horse actuated 'gins'. Eventually, two shafts and steam-driven pit gear were installed to mine the thicker coal further down. The pit closed in July 1951 when the seam was exhausted. The 'gin' used at Ellowes Colliery was believed to be the last working example in the Black Country.

== Brewers' House museum ==
In Antwerp, Belgium, the Brewers' House museum is a good example of horse-powered pumping machinery. The building dates from the 16th century; although the original wooden machinery was replaced in cast iron in the mid-19th century, the original layout has been retained.

== Horse mills still in use ==
The Noah Hoover Mennonites, an Old Order Mennonite group, that does not allow any engine power at all, still has several horse mills in use, both in the US and in Belize in Central America. The mills are used to power e. g. a sorghum-cane juicer in Scottsville, Kentucky or saw mills in Springfield and Pine Hill, both in Belize.

== Bibliography ==
- Curtis, Robert I. (2008). "Food Processing and Preparation". In Oleson, John Peter (ed.). The Oxford Handbook of Engineering and Technology in the Classical World. Oxford: Oxford University Press. ISBN 978-0-19-518731-1.
- de Vos, Mariette (2013). "The Rural Landscape of Thugga: Farms, Presses, Mills, and Transport". In Bowman, Alan; Wilson, Andrew (eds.). The Roman Agricultural Economy: Organization, Investment, and Production. Oxford: Oxford University Press. ISBN 978-0-19-966572-3.
- Animal Powered Machines, J. Kenneth Major. Shire Album 128 - Shire Publications 1985. ISBN 0-85263-710-1
- Water-mills windmills and horse-mills of South Africa, James Walton. C Struik Publishers, 1974. ISBN 0-86977-040-3
- "The History of Rochester, New York" by William F. Peck, D. Mason & Co. Publishers 1844

== See also ==
- The International Molinological Society
- Museum of Scottish Country Life
- Lambroughton Titwood Farm Horse Mill
- Donkey Stone
- Edge mill
- Experiment (horse-powered boat)
- Gin gang
- Whim (mining)
