= List of types of mill =

Types of mill include the following:

== Manufacturing facilities ==
=== Categorized by power source ===
- Watermill, a mill powered by moving water
- Windmill, a mill powered by moving air (wind)
- Tide mill, a water mill that uses the tide's movement
- Treadmill or treadwheel, a mill powered by human or animal movement
  - Horse mill, a mill powered by horses' movement

=== Categorized by not being a fixed building ===
- Ship mill, a water mill that floats on the river or bay whose current or tide provides the water movement
- Field mill (carriage), a portable mill

=== Categorized by what is made and/or acted on ===
- Materials recovery facility, processes raw garbage and turns it into purified commodities like aluminum, PET, and cardboard by processing and crushing (compressing and baling) it.
- Rice mill, processes paddy to rice
- Bark mill, produces tanbark for tanneries
- Cereal mill—see Gristmill, below
- Coffee mill
- Colloid mill
- Cider mill, crushes apples to give cider
- Drainage mill pumps water from low-lying land
- Flotation mill, in mining, uses grinding and froth flotation to concentrate ores using differences in materials' hydrophobicity
- Gristmill, a grain mill (flour mill)
- Herb grinder
- Oil mill, see expeller pressing, extrusion
- Ore mill, for crushing and processing ore
- Paper mill
- Pellet mill
- Powder mill, produces gunpowder
- Puppy mill, a breeding facility that produces puppies on a large scale, where the welfare of the dogs is jeopardized for profits
- Rock crusher
- Sugar cane mill
- Sawmill, a lumber mill
  - Millwork
- Starch mill
- Steel mill
- Sugar mill (also called a sugar refinery), processes sugar beets or sugar cane into various finished products
- Textile mills for textile manufacturing:
  - Cotton mill
  - Flax mill, for flax
  - Silk mill, for silk
  - Woollen mill, see textile manufacturing
- Huller (also called a rice mill, or rice husker) is used to hull rice
- Wire mill, for wire drawing

=== Other types ===
- See Category:Industrial buildings and structures

== Industrial tools for size reduction and/or filtration ==
(See comminution, filtration)

- Arrastra, simple mill for grinding and pulverizing (typically) gold or silver ore
- Ball mill, a mill using balls to crush the material
- Bead mill a type of Mill (grinding)
- Burr mill or burr grinder, a mill using burrs to crush the material, usually manufactured for a single purpose such as coffee beans, dried peppercorns, coarse salt, spices, or poppy seeds
- Coffee grinder
- Conical mill (or conical screen mill)
- Cutting mill, a device commonly used in laboratories for the preliminary size reduction of materials
- Disc mill (or disk mill)
- Edge mill
- End mill, a type of milling cutter used in milling in the machining sense
- Expeller pressing (also called oil pressing)
- Hammermill, a mill using little hammers to crush the material
- IsaMill, an energy-efficient mineral industry grinding mill that was jointly developed in the 1990s by Mount Isa Mines
- Jet mill, grinds materials by using a high speed jet of compressed air or inert gas to impact particles into each other.
- Milling machine, a machine tool that performs milling (machining)
- Mortar and pestle
- Pin mill, a mill for achieving very fine particle sizes
- Planetary mill
- Roller mill, a mill using rollers to grind or pulverize grain and other raw materials using cylinders
- Rolling mill, for rolling (metalworking)
  - Strip mill, a type of rolling mill
- Slitting mill, for slitting metal into nails
- Stamp mill, a specialized machine for reducing ore to powder for further processing or for fracturing other materials
- Three roll mill
- Ultrasonic disintegrator a type of Mill (grinding)
- Vibratory mill a type of Mill (grinding)
- VSI mill (vertical shaft impactor mill), a mill that comminutes particles of material into smaller (finer) particles by throwing them against a hard surface inside the mill
- A wet mill performs wet-milling: steeps a substance in water to remove specific compounds
- Wiley mill, a specific group of grinding mills manufactured under the name Thomas Scientific
