= GlobeCore =

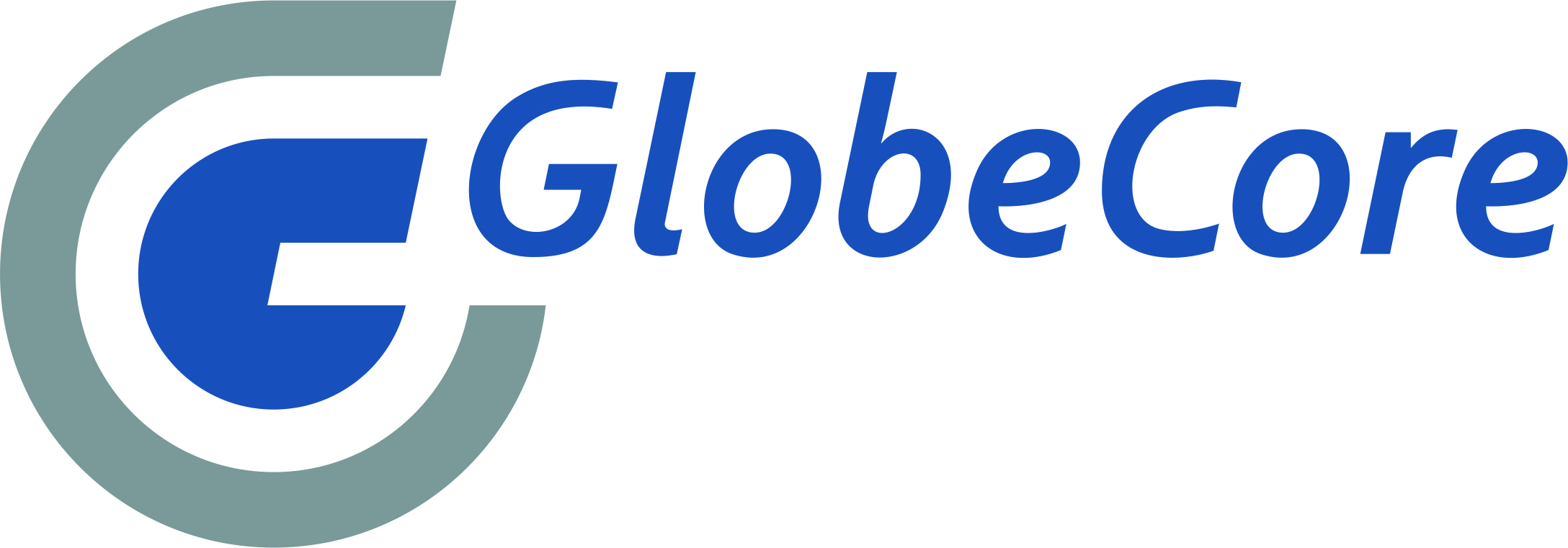
- Company type: Private company
- Industry: Electric power industry, petroleum industry, road construction
- Headquarters: Oldenburg, Niedersachsen, Germany
- Area served: Worldwide
- Website: globecore.com

GlobeCore is a manufacturer and vendor of industrial equipment for fuel and oil-related production and refining processes. Its headquarters are in Oldenburg, Germany. Globecore GmbH has been liquidated on 29 July 2021. According to Handelsregister, the company was first renamed to Trafoölaufbereitungsanlagen GmbH on 11 May 2021 and then later liquidated.

== Services ==
GlobeCore’s spectrum of services include production of bitumen emulsions, modified bitumen, oil regeneration and oil purification, fuel blending, biodiesel production, wet milling, nonoblending,metal cutting, assembling of processing units. GlobeCore has facilities in several countries, including the United States, UAE, and South Africa. Technical assistance to customers is provided by 17 dealer agencies worldwide. The company maintains, repairs and updates its own equipment and provides training for customers' service staff.

GlobeCore serves the following industry sectors:

- power generation and distribution
- power utilities
- transmission companies
- construction companies

== Products ==
The following is a list of processing units manufactured by GlobeCore:

- mobile units for filtration, drying, degassing, regeneration of oil and other oil products
- units for warming up and refilling of transformers
- gearbox oil changing units for wind turbines
- air drying units
- units for drying transformer solid insulation
- colloid mills
- bitumen emulsion production units
- polymer modified bitumen units
- units for wastewater treatment intensification
- units for blending and on-line dissolving of liquids and for high-octane gasoline production
- units for pumping adhesive materials
- bitumen filters
- bitumen storage tanks
- laboratory units
