= Frederick Bond =

Frederick Bond may refer to:

- Frederick Bond (naturalist) (1811–1889), English naturalist
- Frederick Bligh Bond (1864–1945), English architect and psychical researcher
- Frederick William Bond (1887–1942), British animal photographer

== See also ==
- Fred Bond (1929–1997), American politician and tobacco industry representative
- Fred Chester Bond (1899–1977), American mining engineer
