= Pin mill =

A pin mill is a mill that comminutes materials by the action of pins that repeatedly move past each other. Much like a kitchen blender, it breaks up substances through repeated impact. The mill is a type of vertical shaft impactor mill and consists of two rotating discs with pins embedded on one face. The discs are arrayed parallel to each other so that the pins of one disk face those of the other. The substance to be homogenized is fed into the space between the disks and either one or both disks are rotated at high speeds.

Pin mills can be used on both dry substances and liquid suspensions.

Pin mills are commonly use in the manufacture of pharmaceuticals, as they can achieve particle sizes as low as a few micrometers. However, heat generated by friction can sometimes be a concern.
