= Comminuted =

Comminuted may refer to:

- Comminution, the process in which solid materials are reduced in size, by crushing, grinding and other processes
- Bone fracture, as in a crushed or splintered bone
- Comminuted skull fracture, with broken portions of bone displaced inward
