= Mill (grinding) =

Device that breaks solid materials into smaller pieces by grinding, crushing, or cutting

Attrition mill
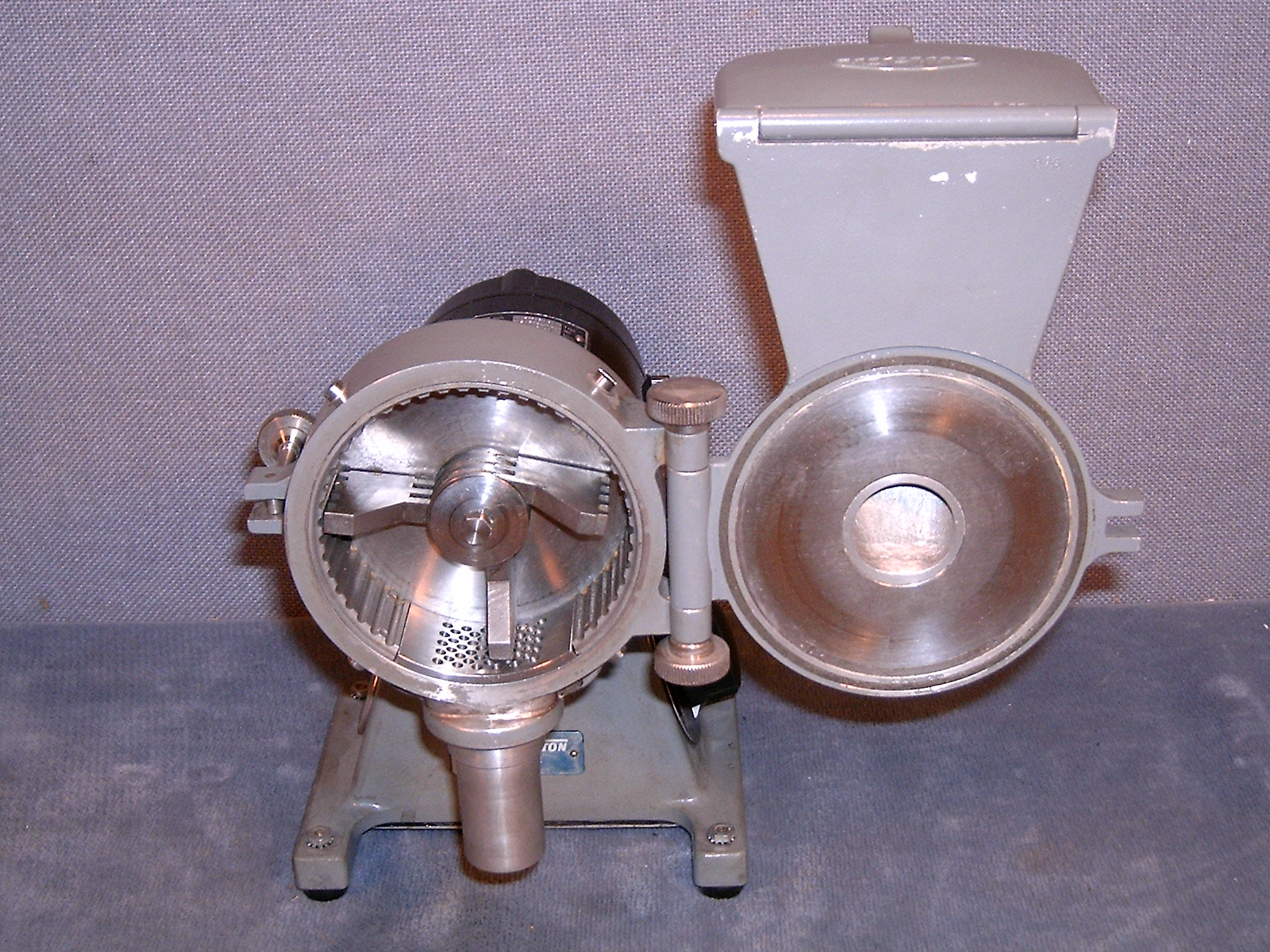
- A tabletop hammer mill
- Other names: Grinding mill
- Uses: Grinding
- Related items: Mortar and pestle Expeller; Extruder

A mill is a device, often a structure, machine or kitchen appliance, that breaks solid materials into smaller pieces by grinding, crushing, or cutting. Such comminution is an important unit operation in many processes. There are many different types of mills and many types of materials processed in them. Historically, mills were powered by hand or by animals (e.g., via a hand crank), working animal (e.g., horse mill), wind (windmill) or water (watermill). In the modern era, they are usually powered by electricity.

The grinding of solid materials occurs through mechanical forces that break up the structure by overcoming the interior bonding forces. After the grinding the state of the solid is changed: the grain size, the grain size disposition and the grain shape.

Milling also refers to the process of breaking down, separating, sizing, or classifying aggregate material (e.g. mining ore). For instance rock crushing or grinding to produce uniform aggregate size for construction purposes, or separation of rock, soil or aggregate material for the purposes of structural fill or land reclamation activities. Aggregate milling processes are also used to remove or separate contamination or moisture from aggregate or soil and to produce "dry fills" prior to transport or structural filling.

Grinding may serve the following purposes in engineering:

- increase of the surface area of a solid
- manufacturing of a solid with a desired grain size
- pulping of resources

== Grinding laws ==
In spite of a great number of studies in the field of fracture schemes there is no formula known which connects the technical grinding work with grinding results. Mining engineers, Peter von Rittinger, Friedrich Kick and Fred Chester Bond independently produced equations to relate the needed grinding work to the grain size produced and a fourth engineer, R.T.Hukki suggested that these three equations might each describe a narrow range of grain sizes and proposed uniting them along a single curve describing what has come to be known as the Hukki relationship.

In stirred mills, the Hukki relationship does not apply and instead, experimentation has to be performed to determine any relationship.

To evaluate the grinding results the grain size disposition of the source material (1) and of the ground material (2) is needed. Grinding degree is the ratio of the sizes from the grain disposition. There are several definitions for this characteristic value:

- Grinding degree referring to grain size d_{80}

$$Z_d=\frac{d_{80,1}}{d_{80,2}}\,$$
Instead of the value of d_{80} also d_{50} or other grain diameter can be used.

- Grinding degree referring to specific surface

$$Z_S=\frac{S_{v,2}}{S_{v,1}}=\frac{S_{m,2}}{S_{m,1}}\,$$

The specific surface area referring to volume S_{v} and the specific surface area referring to mass S_{m} can be found out through experiments.

- Pretended grinding degree

$$Z_a=\frac{d_1}{a}\,$$
The discharge die gap a of the grinding machine is used for the ground solid matter in this formula.

== Grinding machines ==
In materials processing a grinder is a machine for producing fine particle size reduction through attrition and compressive forces at the grain size level. See also crusher for mechanisms producing larger particles. In general, grinding processes require a relatively large amount of energy; for this reason, an experimental method to measure the energy used locally during milling with different machines was recently proposed.

=== Autogenous mill ===
Autogenous or autogenic mills are so-called due to the self-grinding of the ore: a rotating drum throws larger rocks of ore in a cascading motion which causes impact breakage of larger rocks and compressive grinding of finer particles. It is similar in operation to a SAG mill as described below but does not use steel balls in the mill. Also known as ROM or "Run Of Mine" grinding.

Operation of a ball mill

=== Ball mill ===
A typical type of fine grinder is the ball mill. A slightly inclined or horizontal rotating cylinder is partially filled with balls, usually stone or metal, which grind material to the necessary fineness by friction and impact with the tumbling balls. Ball mills normally operate with an approximate ball charge of 30%. Ball mills are characterized by their smaller (comparatively) diameter and longer length, and often have a length 1.5 to 2.5 times the diameter. The feed is at one end of the cylinder and the discharge is at the other. Ball mills are commonly used in the manufacture of Portland cement and finer grinding stages of mineral processing. Industrial ball mills can be as large as 8.5 m (28 ft) in diameter with a 22 MW motor, drawing approximately 0.0011% of the total world's power (see List of countries by electricity consumption). However, small versions of ball mills can be found in laboratories where they are used for grinding sample material for quality assurance.

The power predictions for ball mills typically use the following form of the Bond equation:

$$E= 10 W \left(\frac{1}{\sqrt {P_{80}}} - \frac{1}{\sqrt {F_{80}}}\right)\,$$

where

- E is the energy (kilowatt-hours per metric or short ton)
- W is the work index measured in a laboratory ball mill (kilowatt-hours per metric or short ton)
- P_{80} is the mill circuit product size in micrometers
- F_{80} is the mill circuit feed size in micrometers.

=== Buhrstone mill ===
Another type of fine grinder commonly used is the French buhrstone mill, which is similar to old-fashioned flour mills.

=== High pressure grinding rolls ===
A high pressure grinding roll, often referred to as HPGRs or roller press, consists out of two rollers with the same dimensions, which are rotating against each other with the same circumferential speed. The special feeding of bulk material through a hopper leads to a material bed between the two rollers. The bearing units of one roller can move linearly and are pressed against the material bed by springs or hydraulic cylinders. The pressures in the material bed are greater than 50 MPa (7,000 PSI). In general they achieve 100 to 300 MPa. By this the material bed is compacted to a solid volume portion of more than 80%.

The roller press has a certain similarity to roller crushers and roller presses for the compacting of powders, but purpose, construction and operation mode are different.

Extreme pressure causes the particles inside of the compacted material bed to fracture into finer particles and also causes microfracturing at the grain size level. Compared to ball mills HPGRs achieve a 30 to 50% lower specific energy consumption, although they are not as common as ball mills since they are a newer technology.

A similar type of intermediate crusher is the edge runner, which consists of a circular pan with two or more heavy wheels known as mullers rotating within it; material to be crushed is shoved underneath the wheels using attached plow blades.

=== Pebble mill ===
A rotating drum causes friction and attrition between rock pebbles and ore particles. May be used where product contamination by iron from steel balls must be avoided. Quartz or silica is commonly used because it is inexpensive to obtain.

=== Rod mill ===
A rotating drum causes friction and attrition between steel rods and ore particles. But the term 'rod mill' is also used as a synonym for a slitting mill, which makes rods of iron or other metal. Rod mills are less common than ball mills for grinding minerals.

The rods used in the mill, usually a high-carbon steel, can vary in both the length and the diameter. However, the smaller the rods, the larger is the total surface area and hence, the greater the grinding efficiency.

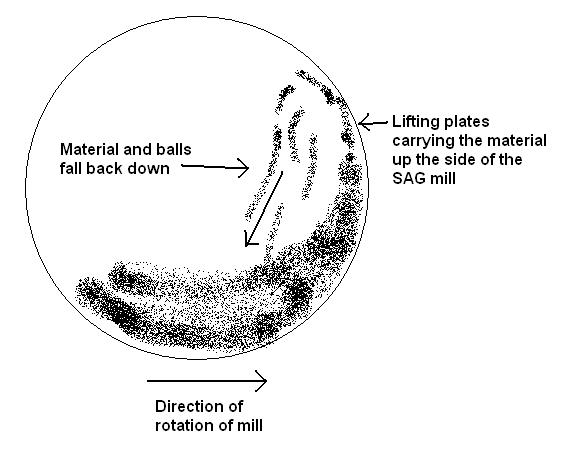
Principle of SAG mill operation

=== SAG mill ===
SAG is an acronym for semi-autogenous grinding. SAG mills are autogenous mills that also use grinding balls like a ball mill. A SAG mill is usually a primary or first stage grinder. SAG mills use a ball charge of 8 to 21%. The largest SAG mill is 12.8m (42') in diameter, powered by a 28 MW (38,000 HP) motor. A SAG mill with a 13.4m (44') diameter and a power of 35 MW (47,000 HP) has been designed.

Attrition between grinding balls and ore particles causes grinding of finer particles. SAG mills are characterized by their large diameter and short length as compared to ball mills. The inside of the mill is lined with lifting plates to lift the material inside the mill, where it then falls off the plates onto the rest of the ore charge. SAG mills are primarily used at gold, copper and platinum mines with applications also in the lead, zinc, silver, alumina and nickel industries.

=== Tower mill ===
Tower mills, often called vertical mills, stirred mills or regrind mills, are a more efficient means of grinding material at smaller particle sizes, and can be used after ball mills in a grinding process. Like ball mills, grinding (steel) balls or pebbles are often added to stirred mills to help grind ore, however these mills contain a large screw mounted vertically to lift and grind material. In tower mills, there is no cascading action as in standard grinding mills. Stirred mills are also common for mixing quicklime (CaO) into a lime slurry. There are several advantages to the tower mill: low noise, efficient energy usage, and low operating costs.

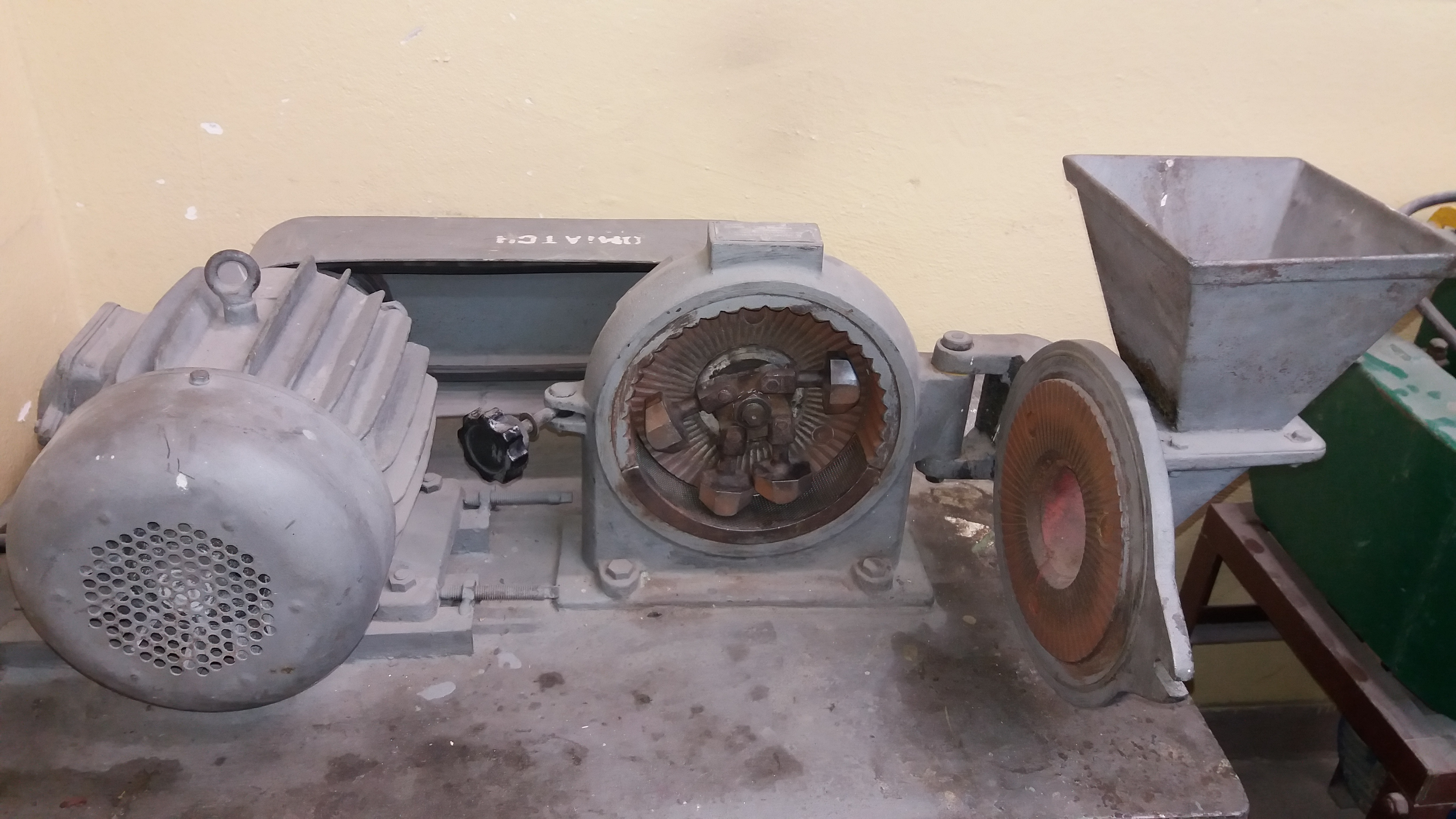
Table top hammer mill

=== Vertical shaft impactor mill (VSI mill) ===
A VSI mill throws rock or ore particles against a wear plate by slinging them from a spinning center that rotates on a vertical shaft. This type of mill uses the same principle as a VSI crusher.

== Types of grinding mills ==
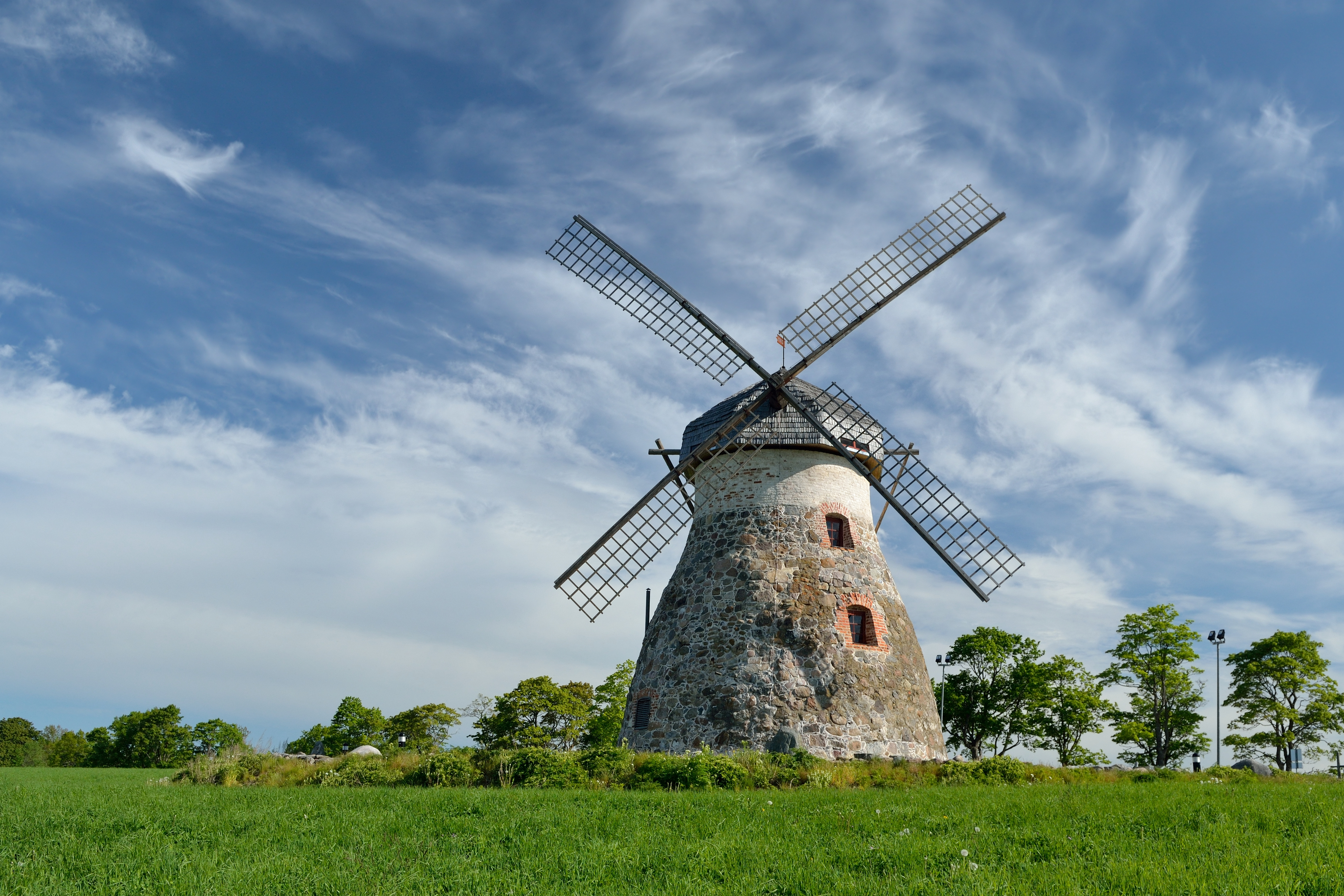
A windmill in Kuremaa, Jõgeva County, Estonia

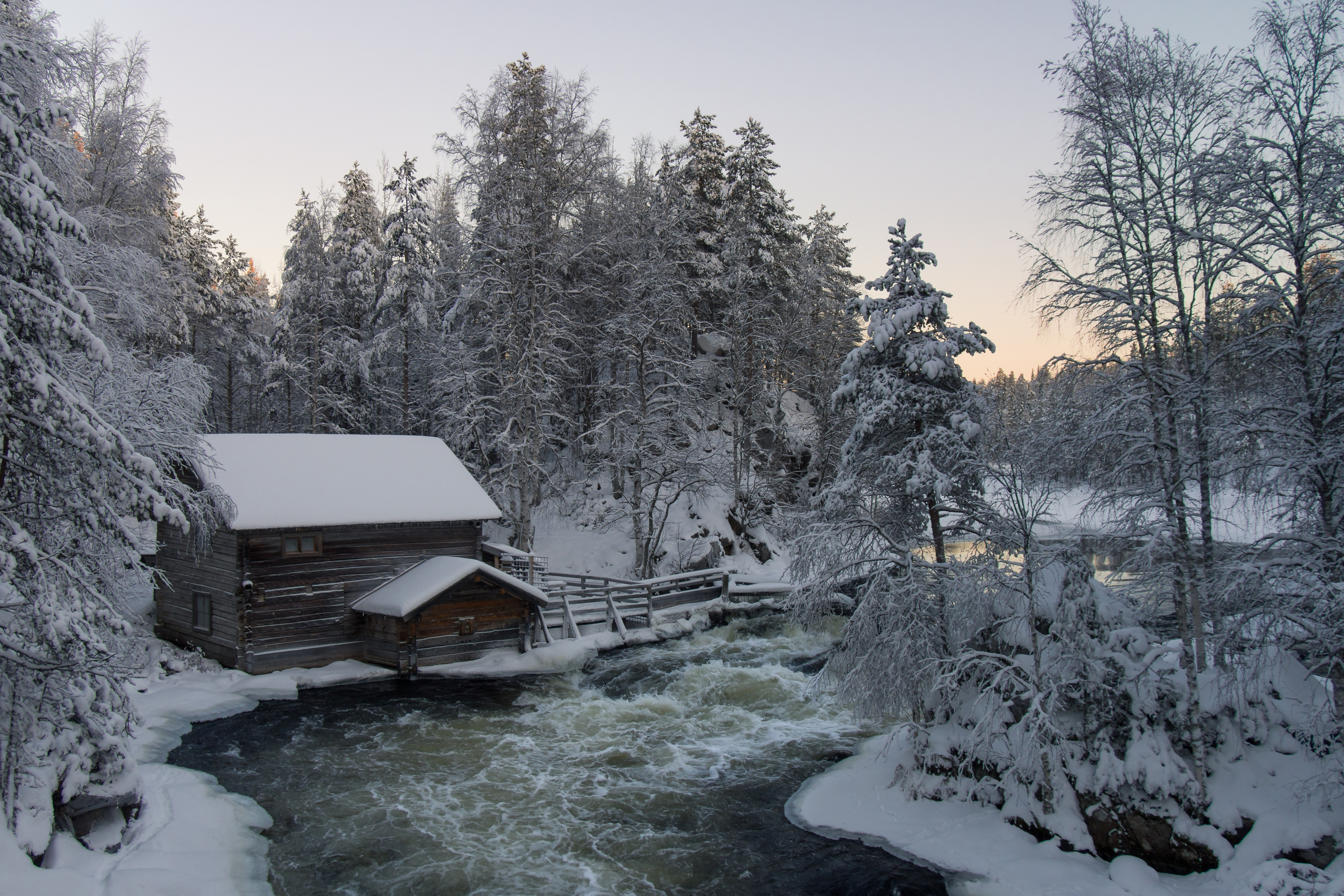
A watermill in Kuusamo, North Ostrobothnia, Finland

- Windmill, wind powered
- Watermill, water powered
- Horse mill, animal powered
- Treadwheel, human powered (archaic: "treadmill")
- Ship mill, floats near a river bank or bridge
- Arrastra, simple mill for grinding and pulverizing (typically) gold or silver ore.
- Roller mill, an equipment for the grinding or pulverizing of grain and other raw materials using cylinders
- Stamp mill, a specialized machine for reducing ore to powder for further processing or for fracturing other materials
- A place of business for making articles of manufacture. The term mill was once in common use for a factory because many factories in the early stages of the Industrial Revolution were powered by a watermill, but nowadays it is only used in a few specific contexts; e.g.,
  - Bark mill produces tanbark for tanneries
  - Cider mill crushes apples to give cider
  - Gristmill grinds grain into flour
  - Oil mill, see expeller pressing, extrusion
  - Paper mill produces paper
  - Sawmill cuts timber
  - Starch mill
  - Steel mill manufactures steel
  - Sugar mill (also called a sugar refinery) processes sugar beets or sugar cane into various finished products
  - Textile mill
    - Silk mill, for silk
    - Flax mill, for flax
    - Cotton mill, for cotton
  - Huller (also called a rice mill, or rice husker) is used to hull rice
  - Powder mill produces gunpowder
- Ball mill
- Bead mill
- Coffee mill
- Colloid mill
- Conical mill
- Disintegrator
- Disc mill
- Edge mill
- Hammermill
- IsaMill
- Jet mill
- Mortar and pestle
- Pellet mill
- Stirred mill
- Three roll mill
- Vibratory mill
- VSI mill
- Wiley mill

== See also ==
- Burr grinder
- Coffee grinder
- Expeller
- Extruder
- Herb grinder
- Millstone
- Rock crusher
- IsaMill
