= McArthur River zinc mine =

Mine in Northern Territory, Australia

McArthur River mine
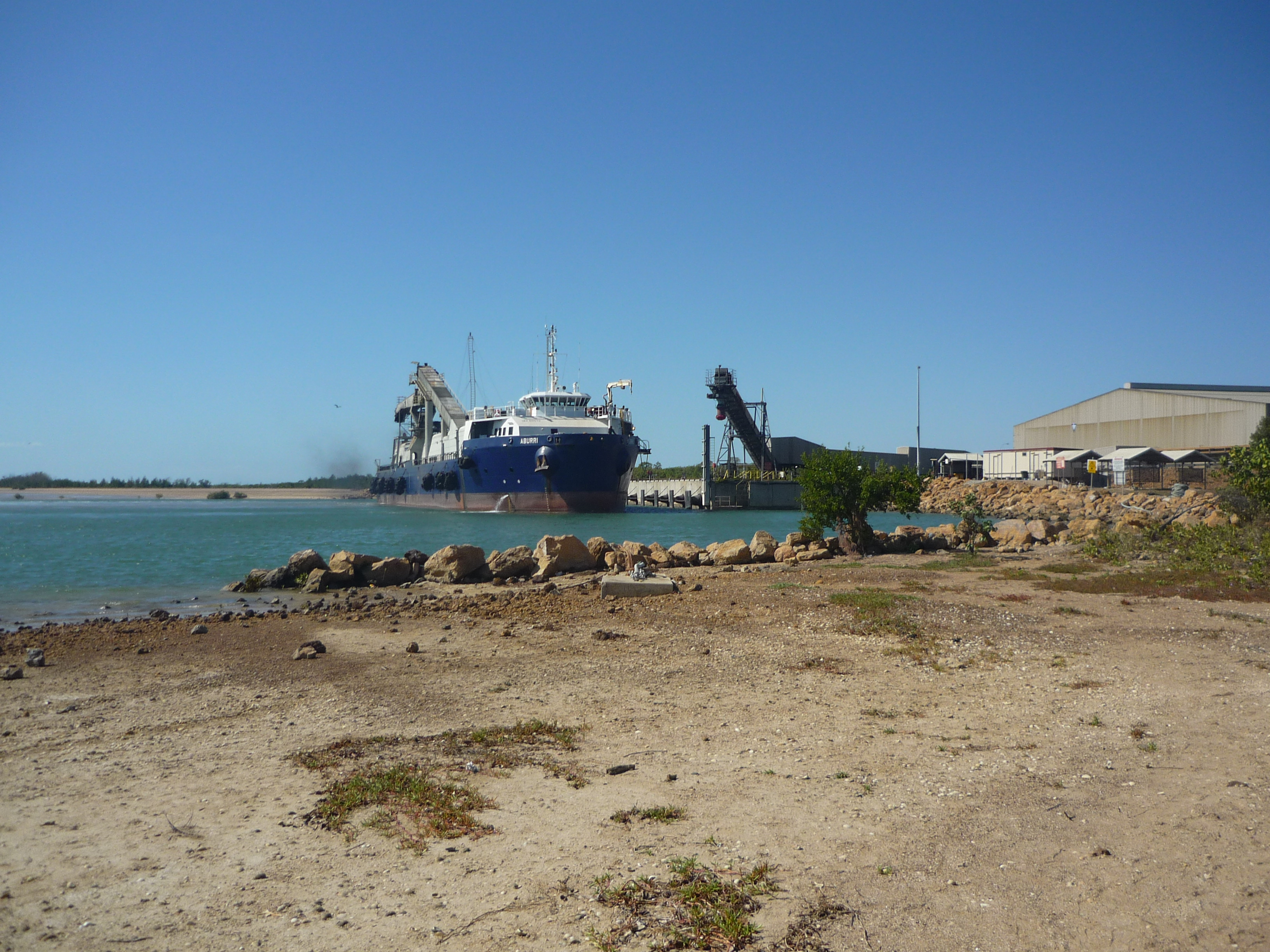
- The MV Aburri transports mineral concentrate from the port to export vessels

- Location in Australia
- Location: Borroloola, Northern Territory, Australia; 16°25′34.81″S 136°04′38.73″E
- Products: Lead-zinc-silver bulk concentrate Zinc concentrate
- Production: Zinc (t): 271,200; Lead (t): 55,300; Silver (oz): 1,675,000
- Financial year: 2019
- Opened: 1993
- Company: Glencore
- Website: http://www.glencore.com/ http://www.mcarthurrivermine.com.au/

The McArthur River mine is a zinc-lead mine, situated about 70 kilometres southwest of Borroloola, near the Gulf of Carpentaria in the northeastern Northern Territory, Australia. It is operated by McArthur River Mining (MRM), a subsidiary of the Swiss mining company Glencore. Although discovered in the 1950s, when it was originally called the HYC or "Here's Your Chance" deposit, it only opened as a mine in 1995. Initially an underground mining operation, the mine has been converted to open-cut.

== Early history ==
The McArthur River zinc mine is based on one of the world's largest zinc, lead and silver deposits. Tom Lynott, the manager of McArthur River station is attributed with identifying the valuable metals in the area as early as 1887. Small mining ventures were attempted and failed due to the cost of transport. The deposit was proven in 1955 by a survey party from Mount Isa Mines (MIM) and named 'HYC' or 'Here's Your Chance'. The name came out of a conversation between chief geologist Syd Carter and fellow geologist Ron Beresford who were reviewing the progress of the survey party in 1956. Bemoaning that Beresford was naming all the prospects, Carter asked him what the specific area of the zinc deposit was going to be named. Bereford replied "here's your chance Syd" to which Carter replied, "that will do."

Drilling continued during the 1960s. By 1977 the first feasibility studies commenced and a pilot operation and temporary work camp were established. Costs prohibited further development at the time, but by 1989 MIM Holdings were issued the necessary leases to bring the mine into operation. In 1992 it joined forces with Japanese consortium ANT Minerals to develop the mine, forming McArthur River Mining Pty Ltd to operate on their behalf. In November 1993, the McArthur River Project Agreement Ratification Act was passed by the Northern Territory Government and the mine was operational by 1995.

== Expansion ==
By 2001, most of the accessible underground ore was extracted and MIM reported a $900,000 loss. It began looking at the feasibility of turning the mine into an open-cut operation. Terms of Reference for an Environmental Impact Statement (EIS) were released in 2003. MIM was acquired by Xstrata in the same year, wholly owning the mine by September 2005.

Plans to expand the mine were announced in 2005. As the main ore body lies directly beneath the river, the expansion required the diversion of 5.5 km of the McArthur River. The mine's expansion was quickly approved, with the support of Prime Minister John Howard. The approval was later revoked by action taken by the Northern Land Council with the support of the traditional owners and the Environmental Defenders Office, through the Supreme Court of the Northern Territory. This decision was also overturned within days and the mine given the go-ahead once more by parliamentary vote. The traditional owners continued to protest, taking the matter to the Federal Court of Australia. They won the case, only to have this decision declared invalid. The final decision was left to Peter Garrett, the Federal Environmental Minister at the time. Xstrata had threatened to sack all 170 staff unless Garrett made a quick decision. On 22 January 2009 he approved the expansion, "subject to a further ten days of evaluation by Indigenous groups and others", promising also to protect local species such as the sawfish and migratory birds. Later in 2009, a report found that the mine's environmental impact was not being monitored.

In 2012 mining giant Glencore bought the remaining 66% share in Xstrata, taking over the McArthur River Mine. In 2013, the Northern Territory Government approved another $360 million expansion that would double its size and production, extending the life of the mine to 2038. Following an environmental impact study, the expansion is expected to increase production to 5.5 million tonnes per year and increase the workforce to 735 by 2020. It will extend the mine's life until 2038 and is projected to contribute $8.4 billion to the Northern Territory economy and $9.3 billion nationally.

== Operation ==
The HYC deposit covers around and area of about two square kilometres and is 55 m in depth. Approximately 2.5 million tonnes of ore containing 383 kt of zinc, 93 kt of lead and 110 t of silver are currently mined per year, supplying markets in Europe, Japan and China. Bulk concentrate is refined to make zinc and lead metal and alloys.

=== Ore processing ===
The HYC ore body consists of an extremely fine dissemination of the valuable mineral grains intermeshed with the gangue. The technology to efficiently produce a marketable concentrate from this type of ore was not available until long after the deposit was identified. After Mount Isa Mines successfully introduced the IsaMill, the fine grinding necessary for mineral liberation was available for McArthur River to be developed. This unusual mineralogy combined with the ore's relatively high lead levels makes the lead and zinc virtually inseparable prior to smelting, and there are very few smelters which can process concentrate which is high in lead. These issues led Mount Isa Mines (later Xstrata) to develop a new lead-zinc leaching process in partnership with Highlands Pacific, known as the Albion process. The technology has now been applied to both gold and base metal projects also.

=== Transport ===
Bulk concentrate is trucked 120 km from the mine to a loading facility in the Gulf of Carpentaria. The concentrate is loaded onto a ship at the Bing Bong loading facility. From here the purpose-built barge called MV Aburri operates a shuttle service from the loading facility to a point fifteen nautical miles offshore where the concentrate is transferred on to overseas bulk carriers. There have been several transportation incidents.

== Environmental impacts ==
=== Creek contamination ===
Seepage from the Tailings Storage Facility at the mine have been detected in the nearby Surprise Creek. Monitoring in 2005, 2007 and 2010 shows that soluble sulfate, zinc and, potentially, lead and cadmium are seeping into Surprise Creek. Dust from operations at the run of mine pad and crushing plant is contaminating stream sediments in both Barney Creek and Surprise Creek, affecting macroinvertebrate species. An extreme risk of embankment failure, or "overtopping", of the spillway in the Tailings Storage Facility due to water volumes has also been identified, requiring immediate action.

=== Fish contamination ===
Local Indigenous people have also raised concerns about contamination of fish in the McArthur River. Testing by the Northern Territory Government and the mine's consultant found that small species, including rainbow fish and bony bream, have been contaminated with lead above maximum-permitted concentrations, making them unsafe for human consumption. In 2015, reports showed that Glencore and the Northern Territory Health Department did not act on a recommendation from the Chief Health Officer to warn people living near the mine to not eat fish from three locations.

A small section of seagrass, which provides food for dugongs has also been destroyed by dredging at the Bing Bong Loading Facility. Potential for bioaccumulation of heavy metals in dugongs, a significant concern for Aboriginals from Borroloola who eat the meat, has been identified as a result from potential ore spillage at the facility.

=== Uncontrolled toxic fire ===
A waste dump at the mine has been burning since 2013. Pyrite iron sulphide stacked in the dump overheated and ignited. The rock was misclassified in its Environmental Impact Statement as 12 per cent reactive potentially acid-forming rock and the rest non-acid-forming. Workers were allegedly told to cover up details of the extent of the fire and now claim to be suffering from respiratory conditions as a result of breathing toxic smoke from the fire.

After claiming the fire had been brought under control, photos of smoke coming from the mine emerged again in March 2015, sparking an investigation by the Environment Protection Authority. Sightings of smoke again in July 2016, turned out to be dust from the dump, causing the immediate closure of the site and an investigation into why dust mitigation measures were not being complied with.

=== Rehabilitation ===
Rehabilitation of the site is estimated to cost up to $1 billion. In 2015, the Northern Territory Government threatened to close McArthur River Mine unless it improved its environmental practices and agreed to increase the size of the financial bond for the site's final remediation. Local Indigenous people and environmental groups continue to call for the mine's immediate closure and rehabilitation of the site.

=== Cyclone ===
The mine closed temporarily in March 2024 after flooding due to record levels of rain, reaching 274 millimetres in just 24 hours due to Tropical Cyclone Megan. Traditional owners then raised concerns over resulting erosion to acidic waste rock piles, however Glencore stated that the "stability and integrity of the dump had not been impacted".

== Climate ==
Climate data for McArthur River Mine Airport, elevation 40 m (130 ft), (1991–2020 normals, extremes 1969–present)
Month	Jan	Feb	Mar	Apr	May	Jun	Jul	Aug	Sep	Oct	Nov	Dec	Year
Record high °C (°F)	45.0 (113.0)	45.3 (113.5)	43.4 (110.1)	40.2 (104.4)	37.7 (99.9)	35.7 (96.3)	36.2 (97.2)	38.4 (101.1)	40.9 (105.6)	43.7 (110.7)	44.3 (111.7)	46.0 (114.8)	46.0 (114.8)
Mean daily maximum °C (°F)	35.8 (96.4)	35.5 (95.9)	35.6 (96.1)	35.2 (95.4)	32.6 (90.7)	30.3 (86.5)	30.8 (87.4)	32.3 (90.1)	36.0 (96.8)	38.2 (100.8)	38.9 (102.0)	38.1 (100.6)	34.9 (94.9)
Mean daily minimum °C (°F)	25.1 (77.2)	24.9 (76.8)	23.9 (75.0)	21.0 (69.8)	16.9 (62.4)	13.4 (56.1)	12.6 (54.7)	13.3 (55.9)	17.7 (63.9)	21.5 (70.7)	24.2 (75.6)	25.2 (77.4)	20.0 (68.0)
Record low °C (°F)	16.0 (60.8)	17.0 (62.6)	13.8 (56.8)	7.5 (45.5)	3.2 (37.8)	1.6 (34.9)	1.0 (33.8)	2.7 (36.9)	6.0 (42.8)	9.3 (48.7)	14.5 (58.1)	16.5 (61.7)	1.0 (33.8)
Average rainfall mm (inches)	257.4 (10.13)	195.1 (7.68)	147.4 (5.80)	33.4 (1.31)	3.2 (0.13)	1.8 (0.07)	0.2 (0.01)	0.5 (0.02)	1.8 (0.07)	25.5 (1.00)	62.5 (2.46)	135.3 (5.33)	864.1 (34.01)
Average rainy days (≥ 1.0 mm)	12.0	11.8	9.0	2.9	0.7	0.3	0.1	0.0	0.3	1.7	5.0	8.8	52.6
Source: Australian Bureau of Meteorology

== See also ==
- McArthur River Mine Airport
- Ore genesis
- Sedimentary exhalative deposits
