= Albion process =

Mineral extraction process

The Albion process is an atmospheric leaching process for processing zinc concentrate, refractory copper and refractory gold. The process is important because it is the most cost-effective method currently in use for extracting both the zinc and lead from concentrates that contain high lead levels (7% or greater). Zinc and lead often occur together and large remaining zinc deposits contain levels of lead that exceed what can be economically extracted through other techniques. The Albion process is not sensitive to the concentration grade and gives favorable recovery with both low grade and dirty concentrates. Environmental impact is also claimed to be mitigated using this technology because in contrast to other methods, sulfur dioxide is not emitted and less energy is consumed over all.

== History ==
Development of the Albion process started during the early nineties led by Mount Isa Mines. It was first patented in 1993. Several pilot plant projects were conducted in 1994 and 1995 which tested the feasibility of using the technology to process high arsenic gold and copper ore.

The Albion Process has been successfully installed in seven projects globally:

- GPM Gold Project (Gold, Armenia)
- Las Lagunas Tailings (Gold, Dominican Republic)
- Sable Copper Project (Copper, Chalcopyrite, Zambia)
- Asturiana de Zinc (Zinc, Spain)
- Nordenham Zinc Refinery (Zinc, Germany)
- McArthur River (Zinc, Australia)

== Process ==
The ore concentrate is first introduced into a stirrer mil (such as IsaMill). This comminution step places a high degree of strain on the mineral lattice and causes an increase in the number of grain boundary fractures and lattice defects of several orders of magnitude. The increase in the number of defects within the mineral lattice "activates" the mineral, facilitating leaching. The rate of leaching is also enhanced, due to the increase in the mineral surface area.

The oxidative leaching stage is carried out in agitated tanks operating at atmospheric pressure. Oxygen is introduced to the leach slurry to assist the oxidation. Leaching is autothermal, not requiring any external heat. Temperature is controlled by the rate of addition of oxygen, and by the leach slurry density.

== Chemistry ==
The general reaction for the leaching process is:

$MS + \frac{1}{2} O_2 + H_2SO_4 \rightarrow MSO_4 + S^0 + H_2O$
