= Fred Chester Bond =

American mining engineer

Fred C. Bond
- Fred C. Bond, 1972
- Born: June 10, 1899; Belcher Hill, Colorado, US
- Died: January 23, 1977 (aged 77); Tucson, Arizona, US
- Education: Colorado School of Mines
- Occupations: mining engineer, laboratory director, consulting engineer
- Known for: advancing the applied science of comminution

Fred Chester Bond (June 10, 1899 – January 23, 1977) was an American mining engineer. A graduate of the Colorado School of Mines, he worked in the mining equipment and ore milling equipment business of Allis-Chalmers from 1930 to 1964.

== Bond Work Index ==
In the 1930s through early 1950s, Bond developed a new theory of comminution that introduced an index, called the 'Bond Work Index', which relates power consumption in crushing and grinding to the feed and product size distribution. His theory and index were introduced in a widely cited 1952 journal article. Bond called his theory the "third theory of comminution", counting those of Peter von Rittinger and Friedrich Kick as the first and second. This term and the terminology of "laws of comminution", as in "Rittinger's law", "Kick's law", and "Bond's law", are sometimes used in the field, along with those of subsequent researchers including Walker and Hukki. Whereas Rittinger's theory held that the work done in breaking rock is proportional to the new surface area produced (that is, inversely proportional to the diameter of the product particles), and Kick's theory held that the work done is directly proportional to the reduction ratio (ratio of feed particle diameter to product particle diameter), Bond's theory held that the work varies inversely as the square root of the product particle diameters. Bond's theory and index brought a greater measure of openness to the calculations for selecting the type, size, and power ratings for ore milling equipment.

Bond was inducted with its first class into the National Mining Hall of Fame posthumously in 1988, and received a Distinguished Achievement Medal by his alma mater, the Colorado School of Mines, in 1952. He received the 1965 AIME Robert H. Richards Award "[f]or major contributions to increased knowledge of crushing and grinding processes and for achievement in industrial application of this knowledge to advancement of the milling industry."

== Career and personal life ==
Bond's autobiography describes life in Colorado in the 1920s and shows some ways in which it was still somewhat pioneering compared with today. It also describes the experience of working as a foreign engineer in South America and some of the poverty encountered, discord argued, friendships made, and mining projects worked on. An interesting account of uranium mining in Canada at Port Radium is given.

Bond and Margaret Jean Lowe were married in Denver, Colorado, on August 29, 1925, and remained married until his death in Tucson in 1977. Margaret Jean died in 1988, also in Tucson. They had two sons, Robert F., born 1926, and Bruce F., born 1933. In addition to his vocation of engineering, Bond had an avocation of thinking and writing on metaphysical subjects.

== Publications ==
- Bond, Fred C. (1952), "The third theory of comminution", Transactions of the American Institute of Mining, Metallurgical, and Petroleum Engineers, 193: 484–494.
- Bond, Fred C. (1961), "Crushing and grinding calculations, Part I-II.", Br. Chem. Eng., 6: 378–385, 543–548.
- Bond, Fred C. (2011), Bond, Laurie J. (ed.), It Happened to Me, Bruce F. Bond. Autobiography, published posthumously.
- Bond, Fred C. (2011b) [1972], Bond, Bruce F. (ed.), To Know What We Are (2 ed.), Bond Publishing. Metaphysical work, republished 2011.
