= Disc mill =

A disc mill is a type of crusher that can be used to grind, cut, shear, shred, fiberize, pulverize, granulate, crack, rub, curl, fluff, twist, hull, blend, or refine. It works in a similar manner to the ancient Buhrstone mill in that the feedstock is fed between opposing discs or plates. The discs may be grooved, serrated, or spiked.

== Applications ==
Typical applications for a single-disc mill are all three stages of the wet milling of field corn, manufacture of peanut butter, processing nut shells, ammonium nitrate, urea, producing chemical slurries and recycled paper slurries, and grinding chromium metal.

Double-disc mills are typically used for alloy powders, aluminum chips, bark, barley, borax, brake lining scrap, brass chips, sodium hydroxide, chemical salts, coconut shells, copper powder, cork, cottonseed hulls, pharmaceuticals, feathers, hops, leather, oilseed cakes, phosphates, rice, rosin, sawdust, and seeds.

Disc mills are relatively expensive to run and maintain and they consume much more power than other shredding machines, and are not used where ball mills or hammermills produce the desired results at a lower cost.

== Mechanism ==
Substances are crushed between the edge of a thick, spinning disk and something else. Some mills cover the edge of the disk in blades to chop up incoming matter rather than crush it.
