= Cutting mill =

Used in laboratories

Cutter mills are mills commonly used in laboratories for the preliminary size reduction of soft, medium-hard, fibrous and tough materials. A rotor inside the mill revolves at high speed. The rotor is equipped with special cutting plates which comminute the sample material.

Different rotor geometries make mills adaptable to different material properties (medium-hard, soft, fibrous or elastic materials). Such mills are suitable for reducing rubber, leather, plastics, grains, dried meat, bones, vegetation and other substances. In elemental analysis, cutting mills should be used with care, since they can contaminate finely-reduced samples with metals from the blades and screens.

== History ==
Cutting mills were invented between the years of 1814 and 1818 and were needed mainly because hand filing the materials took too long. The first two places to use a cutting mill in the industrial world was Springfield and Harpers Ferry armories. These factories found out that the finished product could be produced much faster using these machines than the traditional way of hand filing them. On the private sector, Eli Whitney is said to be one of the more famous inventors that contributed to the birth of the cutting mill.

The cutting mills rise to fame happened around 1954 when it became the world's first machine tool to be controlled numerically. This was a big step because traditionally the machines were completely controlled manually. By the 1980s, there was starting to be small shops that had desktop computers and Computer Numerical Controlled cutting mills. This allowed users to rely solely on the computer and the programming of the software to run the machine.

== Advantages ==
The cutting mill has many advantages associated with it. It can remove material at a very high speed sometimes without using any coolant. The machine can cut anything from plastic to hard metals. The table of the machine is where most of the movement comes from. A cutting mill can reach an accuracy of a tenth of a thousandth of an inch. The cutting mill is very adaptable and versatile. The user is not limited to one tool to work with. There are hundreds of different style and size tools that can be attached and worked with.

== Disadvantages ==
There are also some disadvantages to cutting mills. One of the main disadvantages is that the machines can be very expensive. Cutting mills can cost in the ball park of $20,000 depending on the size and capacity. While it allows the company or shop to turn out high end parts in a short amount of time, a $20,000 machine takes a while to pay off. Another disadvantage is that the workers using the machine will need some sort of general training to be able to operate the machine. The training would not be as extensive as it would be for CNC milling, but you would still have to have it. They can also produce considerable noise and vibration, necessitating soundproofing and sturdy installation. The blades and screens can wear out over time, requiring regular replacement. Furthermore, cutter mills require the feed material to be less than 1 inch thick, which may necessitate pre-processing. Lastly, they are not suitable for achieving extremely fine particle sizes, with a practical limit around 80-mesh.

== See also ==
- Wiley mill
