= Arrastra =

Primitive mill for grinding and pulverizing gold or silver ore

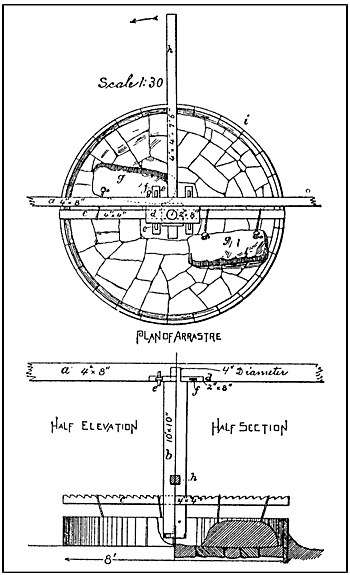
Typical arrastra construction. From Mining and Scientific Press 52 (1886): 237.

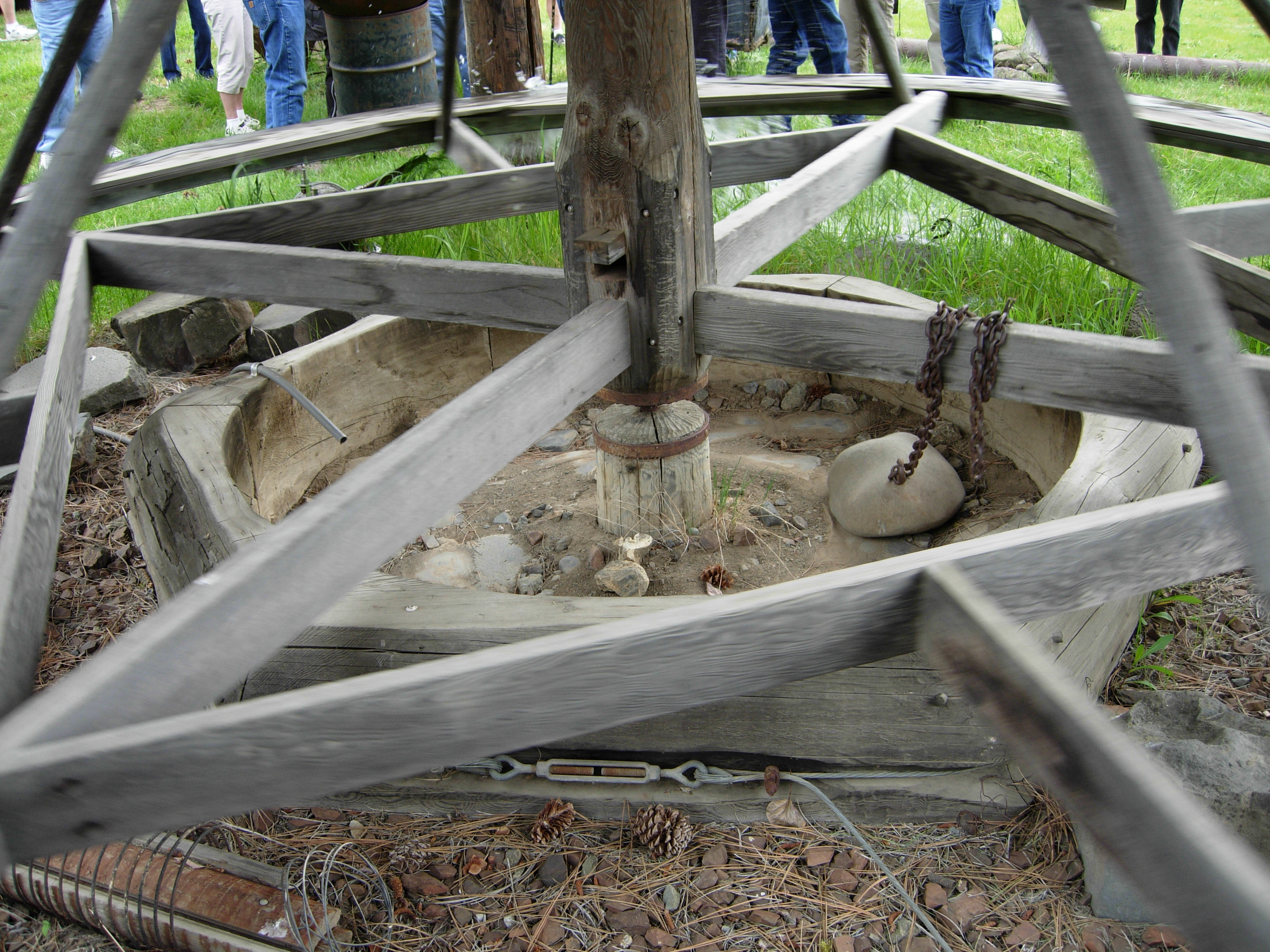
Arrastra demonstration in Liberty, Washington, 2007

An arrastra (or arastra) is a primitive mill for grinding and pulverizing (typically) gold or silver ore. Its simplest form is two or more flat-bottomed drag stones placed in a circular pit paved with flat stones, and connected to a center post by a long arm. With a horse, mule or human providing power at the other end of the arm, the stones were dragged slowly around in a circle, crushing the ore. Some arrastras were powered by a water wheel; a few were powered by steam or gasoline engines, and even electricity.

Arrastras were widely used throughout the Mediterranean region since Phoenician times. The Spanish introduced the arrastra to the New World in the 16th century. The word "arrastra" comes from the Spanish language arrastrar, meaning to drag along the ground. Arrastras were suitable for use in small or remote mines, since they could be built from local materials and required little investment capital.

For gold ore, the gold was typically recovered by amalgamation with quicksilver. The miner would add clean mercury to the ground ore, continue grinding, rinse out the fines, then add more ore and repeat the process. At cleanup, the gold amalgam was carefully recovered from the low places and crevices in the arrastra floor. The amalgam was then heated in a distillation retort to recover the gold, and the mercury was saved for reuse.

In the Comstock region of Nevada, the arrastra was the earliest method used to process silver ore. Introduced to Mexico around 1540, the arrastra was used to crush ore beneath a heavy drag stone pulled by a horse or ox. Water, salt, and copper sulfate were then added, and the heat of the sun helped transform the crushed ore into a thick paste. Mercury was added during the final stage, where it combined with the silver and gold to form a heavy amalgam that settled to the bottom for recovery.
