= Frederick William Bond =

British fashion designer

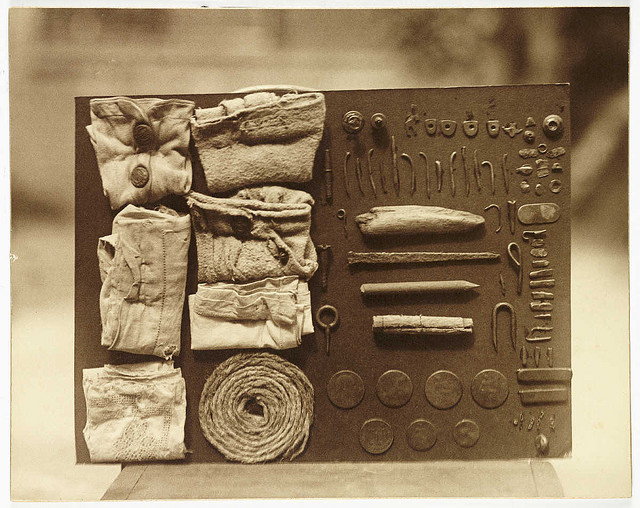
Contents of an Ostrich's stomach, photo by Bond, c. 1930

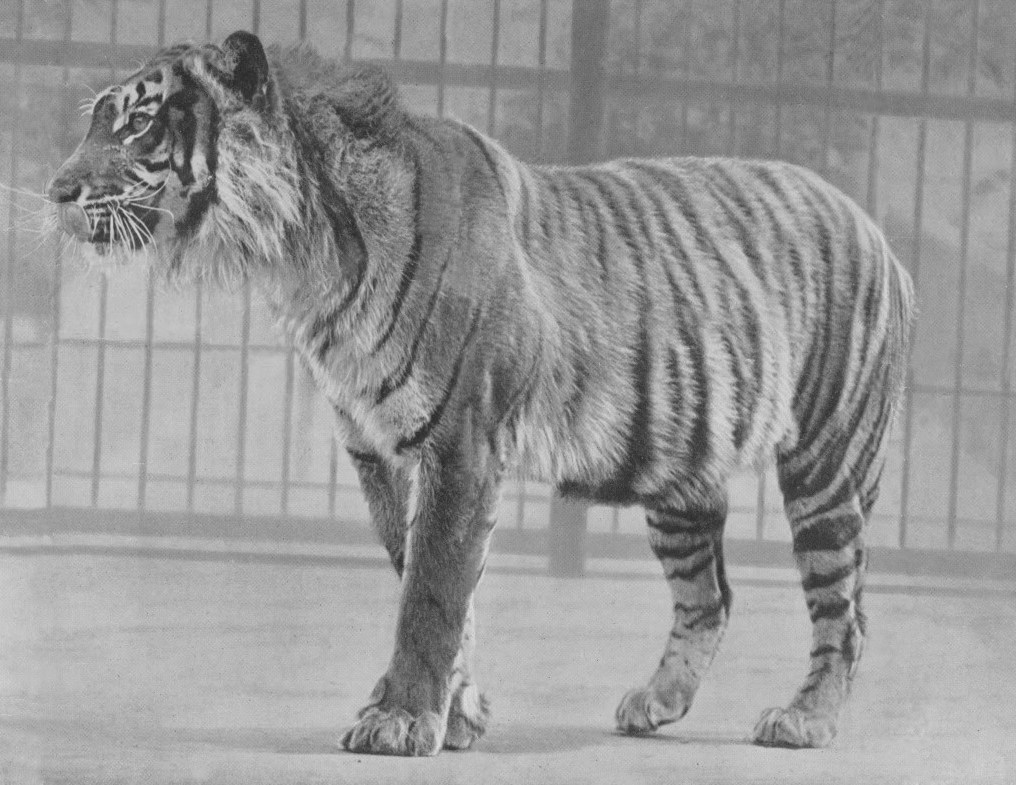
Javan or Malay Tiger in London Zoo, photo by Bond

Frederick William Bond (1887–1942) was a British animal photographer, particularly of London Zoo.

In 1903, Bond started work in the Zoological Society of London's accounts department. He served in the Army from 1917 to 1919 and after the First World War, he was appointed as the Society's accountant.

On his death in 1942, he left his extensive photo collection to the Zoological Society of London.

His work is in the permanent collection of the Victoria and Albert Museum. London Zoo have digitised more than 1,100 of Bond's photographs.
