= VSI mill =

A VSI mill (vertical shaft impactor mill) is a mill that comminutes particles of material into smaller (finer) particles by throwing them against a hard surface inside the mill (called the wear plate). Any hard or friable materials can be ground with low value of metal waste. This type of mill is combined with a classifier for fine tuning of a product size.

== Operating characteristic ==
- Strength of material - up to 200 MPa
- Mohs hardness - up to 7
- Absolute humidity - up to 1% (strong condition)
- Feed size - up to 40 mm
- Product size - less than 0.5 mm
- Capacity - up to 20 t/h

Mill uses for hard and friable materials. Wood, most metals and plastics are inoperable. Raw material must be dry. Capacity strongly depends on characteristics of material and a product size.

== Grinding principle ==
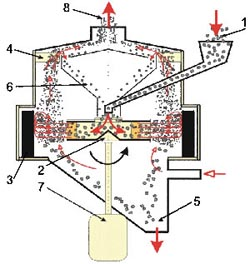
Fig. 1. A schematic drawing of a VSI mill

A schematic drawing of a VSI mill is shown at Fig. 1. Raw material particles transports via hopper (1) into the accelerator (2). An accelerator (2) rotates with a high speed and particles increase their speed by a centrifugal force. After leaving channels of the accelerator particles impact with a wear plate (3) in the grinding chamber. A high speed impact leads to destruction of particles into pieces of different size. Big particles (greater than 1 mm) fall down to outlet (5) and later they transport to hopper by an elevator. Other particles (less than 1 mm) lift by air stream into a classifier where blades (4) make rotating dust flow. Middle size particles shift to wall by centrifugal force in a big chamber of a classifier and fall down to cone (6) and later they move into an accelerator (2). Small particles move by air stream to outlet (8). Fine tune of a product size is achieved by changing of blade angle.

=== Accelerator ===
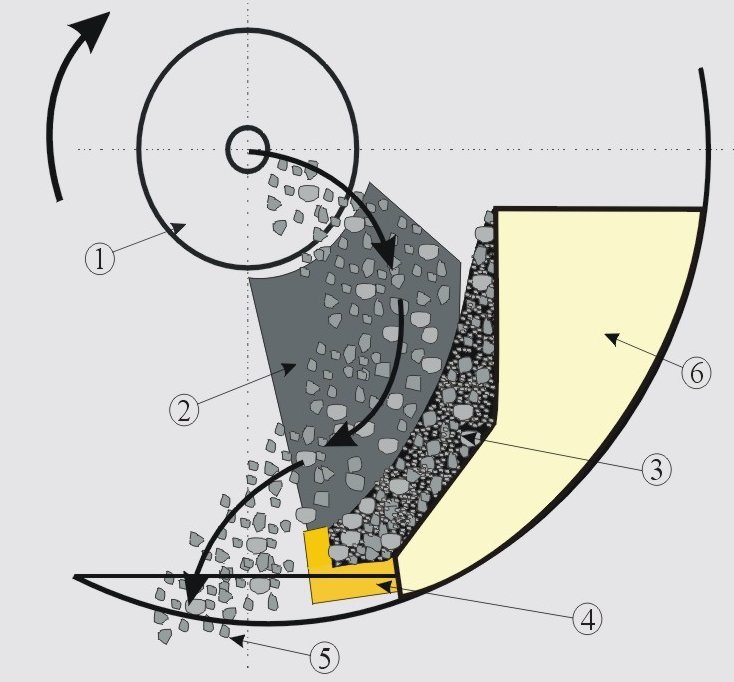
Fig. 2. A schematic drawing of the accelerator in a VSI mill

A schematic drawing of a VSI mill accelerator is shown at Fig. 2. Very high speed of particle motion needs to obtain good grinding but high speed must lead to high metal waste. Really it doesn't happen because in an accelerator particles move along same material in special inwall area (3) which is bounded by accelerator body and hard metal blade (4). Material in such region holds by centrifugal force. Wear plates (2) and cone (1) use also to avoid wear and tear of an accelerator body.

== Usage of VSI mills ==
You cannot use VSI mill 'as is'. It requires organized feeding, an air stream, and its cleaning from product (dust). Therefore, a full complete grinding line consists of a feeder, an elevator, a VSI mill with an air classifier, a cyclone, a fan and a bag filter. If the raw material is soggy, some form of drying is necessary before grinding.

== Grinding and product properties ==
- Implementation of dry grinding process.
- Ability to adjust finished product size on-line, during the operation.
- Superior selectivity of minerals liberation in Titan M mill as compared to conventional ball mills (for example, copper ore-dressing with Titan VSI mill yields 17,6% copper concentrate with 82,6% extraction as compared to 14,5% and 76,1% obtained with a ball mill grinding, respectively).
- Ability to achieve minerals liberation by coarser grinding (for example, 95% liberation of copper-zinc ores is achieved by VSI grinding to minus 0,3 mm, in comparison a similar result can be achieved with a ball mill grinding to minus 0,074 mm).
- Increase durability of construction materials ground by Titan M as a result of a mechanical activation (for example, the cellular concrete strength increases 1,5 - 2,5 fold, while cement and lime consumption is reduced by 15 - 25% and by 20%, respectively).
- Increase in physical and chemical activity of cements, phosphorites and other materials.
- Low energy consumption.

== See also ==
- Mill (grinding)
