= Conical mill =

A conical mill (or conical screen mill) is a machine used to reduce the size of material in a uniform manner. It is an alternative to the hammermill or other forms of grinding mills. The conical mill varies in diameter from where the feed enters to where the product exits.

The conical mill operates by having the product being fed into the mill by gravity or vacuum. A rotating impeller forces the material outward to a conical screen surface, where it is sized and passed through the openings in the screen. Once finished, the product simply drops through the milling chamber to a receptacle underneath.

Conical mills come in a variety of sizes from tabletop lab models to full-size high-capacity machines for use in processing large quantities of material, and the impeller and screen can be customized for each individual use. The machines can be used not only to reduce the size of particles, but also for deagglomeration, sieving, dispersion, and mixing.

The applications for a conical mill are varied, but trend towards use in the food, cosmetic, chemical, and pharmaceutical industries:

- Reclaiming broken pharmaceutical tablets by grinding them back into powder for re-forming.
- Sizing wet granulated particles before drying, and sizing dry granulated particles after they've dried before tabletting.
- Delumping dry detergent during production
- Dispersing pearl into blush and face powder
- Deagglomerating dried fruits such as raisins or cranberries.
- Creating breadcrumbs from scraps

The conical mill has some marked advantages over the hammermill, especially in the pharmaceutical industry: low noise, heat and dust, a more uniform particle size, flexibility in design, and higher capacity.

The concept of the conical mill was created in 1976 by the engineers of Quadro Engineering, who remain the foremost manufacturer of conical mills. Conical mills are available in Ex- execution with a variety of sieves and impellers. The mill head can be mounted on a mobile lifter which allows for easy up and down movement for docking into containers, tablet presses and others. The mill head is dismounted from a lifter for easy cleaning. In combination with companion equipment like conical screw mixers and vacuum conveyors, conical mills help streamline and modernize solid processing workflows in the pharmaceutical, cosmetic, food, and chemical industries.

== Sources ==
- Pharmaceutical Dosage Forms - Details the advantages of conical mills in pharmaceutical industries
- Fexofenadine Composition and Process for Preparing - Describes how a conical mill works
- Schenck LR, Plank RV (February 2008). "Impact milling of pharmaceutical agglomerates in the wet and dry states". Int J Pharm. 348 (1–2): 18–26. doi:10.1016/j.ijpharm.2007.07.029. PMID 17804181. — study of a conical mill's ability to size wet and dry granulates
