= Jet mill =

Pneumatic powered mill

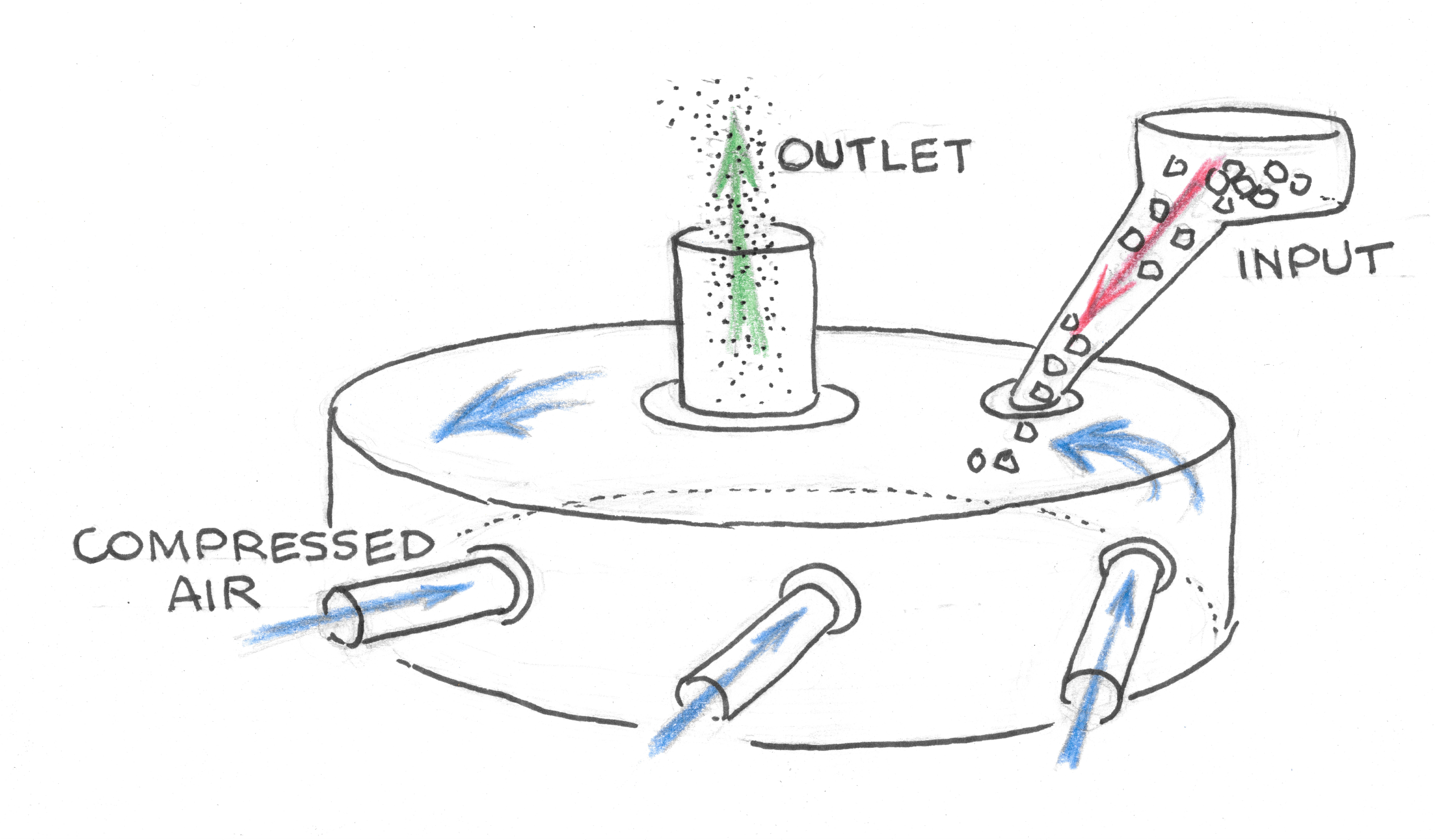
Illustration of a jet mill. Red arrow shows material entering the mill. Blue arrows show compressed air entering and circulating in the mill. Green arrow shows small particles leaving mill.

A jet mill grinds materials by using a high speed jet of compressed air or inert gas to impact particles into each other. Jet mills can be designed to output particles below a certain size while continuing to mill particles above that size, resulting in a narrow size distribution of the resulting product. Particles leaving the mill can be separated from the gas stream by cyclonic separation.

== Particle size ==
A jet mill consists of a short cylinder, meaning the cylinder's height is less than its diameter. Compressed gas is forced into the mill through nozzles tangent to the cylinder wall, creating a vortex. The gas leaves the mill through a tube along the axis of the cylinder. Solid particles in the mill are subject to two competing forces:

1. Centrifugal force created by the particles traveling in circles
2. Centripetal force created by the drag from the gas as it flows from the nozzles along the wall to the outlet in the center of the mill

Flow past a solid particle reacting to centrifugal force: streamlines, drag force F_{d} and force by gravity or centrifugal force F_{g}. F_{d} points toward the center of the mill, and F_{g} points to the wall.

The drag on small particles is less than large particles, according to the formula derived from Stokes' law,

$$V = \frac{2}{9}\frac{\left(\rho_p - \rho_f\right)}{\mu} g\, R^2$$,

where

- V is the flow settling velocity (m/s)
  - vertically downwards if ρ_{p} > ρ_{f},
  - upwards if ρ_{p} < ρ_{f} ),
- g is the gravitational acceleration (m/s^{2}),
- ρ_{p} is the mass density of the particles (kg/m^{3}),
- ρ_{f} is the mass density of the fluid (kg/m^{3}),
- μ is the dynamic viscosity (kg /m*s), and
- R is the radius of the spherical particle (m).

The formula shows that particles will be pulled toward the wall of the mill according to the square of their radius or diameter. Large particles will continue the comminution process, until they are small enough to stay in the center of the mill where the discharge port is located.

== Typical parameters ==
- Diameter of mill: from 0.05 meters to 1 meter (from 2 inches to 42 inches)
- Gas pressure: 8.3 Bar (120 PSI)
- Starting particle size: 800 microns or less, or as limited by the size of the inlet of the feed venturi
- Final particle size: down to 0.5 microns

== Pharmaceutical applications ==
Jet milling is widely used in the pharmaceutical industry to micronize active pharmaceutical ingredients (APIs) and some excipients, because size reduction occurs mainly through particle–particle collisions in the gas stream rather than contact with grinding media, which limits contamination and permits processing of abrasive or high-purity materials. Because the compressed gas cools as it expands through the nozzles, jet mills impart relatively little thermal stress and can process heat-sensitive and low-melting compounds.

The spiral jet mill (also called a pancake or loop mill) is the geometry most commonly used for pharmaceutical micronization; feed is introduced through a venturi and accelerated by tangential gas jets, while an internal centrifugal classifier retains coarse particles for further grinding and allows fines to exit through a central outlet, giving volume median diameters in the low-micrometre range. Opposed-jet and fluidized-bed jet mills, in which opposing gas streams collide within the chamber, are also used, sometimes with an integrated air classifier.

A major application is the preparation of powders for inhalation. Drug deposition in the lung depends on the aerodynamic diameter of the inhaled particles, and the respirable fraction that reaches the lower airways generally lies in the 1–5 μm range; jet milling is the standard method for bringing corticosteroids, β_{2}-agonists and other inhaled actives into this range for dry-powder inhaler and metered-dose inhaler products.

Jet milling is also applied to poorly water-soluble oral drugs. Reducing particle size increases the specific surface area available for dissolution, which can raise the dissolution rate and, for compounds whose absorption is limited by dissolution, improve bioavailability.

Above sub-micron sizes, micronization increases the dissolution rate but not the equilibrium solubility of the crystalline drug; once gastrointestinal fluid is saturated, further surface area adds little dissolved drug. It is therefore generally chosen when absorption is limited by dissolution rate. Where greater enhancement is needed, nanomilling is used; where the crystalline solubility itself is too low to reach the required exposure, amorphous solid dispersions, in which the drug is molecularly dispersed in a polymer matrix, are used instead. Compared with these approaches, micronization retains the crystalline form, permits high drug loading and uses equipment common in oral solid-dose manufacture, whereas amorphous solid dispersions typically require several parts polymer per part drug.

Pharmaceutical jet milling is carried out under good manufacturing practice (GMP) conditions, and mills used for highly potent or cytotoxic compounds are enclosed in containment isolators to keep operator exposure within defined occupational limits. The high specific energy delivered during milling can also alter the solid state of the API—for example by creating amorphous regions at particle surfaces or inducing polymorphic change—so milled material is often characterised and, where necessary, conditioned before formulation.

== Applications ==
Jet mills are used across a range of industries where fine, contamination-free powders with a narrow particle size distribution are required. Because grinding occurs mainly through particle–particle collisions rather than contact with grinding media, jet mills are used for abrasive, heat-sensitive, and high-purity materials.

In the ceramics and minerals industries, jet mills are used to grind materials such as alumina, silica, zircon, talc, kaolin, and other industrial minerals to micron and sub-micron sizes, where the absence of metallic grinding media helps preserve product purity.

In pharmaceutical manufacturing, jet mills are widely used for micronizing active pharmaceutical ingredients (APIs) and excipients. Pharmaceutical jet milling can reduce API particle size into the low-micrometre range and is influenced by material properties such as elasticity, fracture behaviour, crystallinity, and feed characteristics.

One pharmaceutical use is the production of respirable particles for dry powder inhalers. Dry powders for pulmonary delivery commonly require particles in the aerodynamic size range suitable for lung deposition, often around 1–5 μm, and jet milling is one of the manufacturing approaches used to produce micronized inhalation powders.

Jet milling is also used for poorly water-soluble drugs, where particle size reduction can increase surface area and accelerate dissolution without changing the chemical structure of the API. For some poorly soluble compounds, micronization improves dissolution rate while not necessarily changing equilibrium solubility.

When jet milling is used for APIs, the operation may be subject to current good manufacturing practice requirements applicable to API manufacturing. For potent or hazardous compounds, occupational exposure banding and related exposure-control frameworks may be used to guide containment and risk-management measures.

In electronics and energy applications, jet milling is used to prepare toner, battery electrode materials, and other advanced powders where tight control of particle size and shape is important to product performance.
