= Edge mill =

Squeezing mill

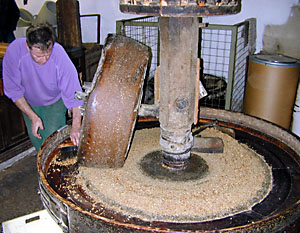
Edge runners in an oil mill

An edge mill is a mill used for crushing or grinding in which stones roll around on their edges on a level circular bed. They were developed in China in the third century and are still used today in remote villages around the world. When the millstones were replaced with iron or steel disks in the 19th century, the mills were known as Chilean mills.

It is used for milling ore and as an oil mill. Horse or oxen-driven versions were used in pre–Industrial Revolution America as bark mills to shred tree bark to derive tannins for the leather industry.
