= Oil regeneration =

Extraction of contaminants from oil

Oil regeneration is the extraction of contaminants from oil in order to restore its original properties to be used equally with fresh oils. Oil regeneration is different from oil purification in that purification is sometimes used to extract contaminants from natural or crude oil, while regeneration is used in aged oil.

In practice, to achieve a complete regeneration of oil using only one method is difficult. Therefore, a combination of different approaches are often used.

== Oil aging ==
Aging is a result of physical and chemical processes that change oil while it is being stored or used in machines and mechanisms. The main cause of aging is exposure to high temperatures and contact with air that leads to oxidation, decomposition, polymerization, and condensation of hydrocarbons. Another cause of aging is contamination with metal particles, water, and dust. This accumulation leads to a buildup of slurries, resinous and asphaltic compounds, coke, soot, and various salts and acids in the oils. The oil in which aging process occurs cannot fully perform its functions, and must be either replaced with new oil or regenerated.

== Regeneration by physical methods ==
Physical methods of regeneration do not change the chemical properties of oil. They remove only mechanical impurities (metal particles, sand, dust, as well as tar, asphalt- and coke-like substances, and water). Regeneration by physical methods include:

- Sedimentation: This method is often used as the first stage in regeneration. The contamination particles in oil settle down due to gravity;
- Centrifugation: Centrifugation separates the oil into layers (an oil layer, a rag layer, and a water layer) by centrifugal forces;
- Filtration: Filtration separates suspensions into clean liquid and wet sediment with the help of filters;
- Washing with water and dry washing to remove acidic products from oil (water-soluble low-molecular acids, salts of organic acids).

== Regeneration by physicochemical methods ==
Physicochemical methods are based on the use of coagulants and adsorbents. Coagulants promote the coarsening and precipitation of fine-dispersed asphalt-resinous substances in oil. Adsorbents selectively absorb organic and inorganic compounds. These methods remove asphalt and resinous compounds, emulsified and dissolved water from oil. Absorptive treatment with bleaching clays will neutralize free acid in acid-treated oil, unstable oxidized and sulphurized products as well as traces of sulphonic acid. In addition, clay treatment leads to higher resistance to oil oxidation at high temperatures and increased colour stability. This process is used in clay polishing plants for waste oil re-refining and transformer oil regeneration systems for the reclamation of old transformer oil to as-new condition.

== Regeneration by chemical methods ==
Chemical methods of regeneration remove asphalt, silicic, acidic, some hetero-organic compounds, and water from oils. These methods are based on the interaction of contaminating substances in oil with special reagents introduced into them. The compounds formed as a result of these chemical reactions are then easily removed from oil. Chemical methods include acid and alkaline refining, drying with calcium sulphate or reduction with metal hydrides.

== See also ==
- Oil purification
