= Oil purification =

Removal of contamination in petroleum

Oil purification (transformer, turbine, industrial, etc.) removes oil contaminants in order to prolong oil service life.

== Contaminants of industrial oils ==
Contaminants and various impurities get into industrial oils during storage and operation. The most common contaminants are:

- water;
- solid particles (like soot and dirt);
- gases;
- asphalt-resinous paraffin deposits;
- acids;
- oil sludge;
- organometallic compounds;
- unsaturated hydrocarbons;
- polyaromatic hydrocarbons;
- additive remains;
- products of oil decomposition.

== Methods of oil purification ==
Industrial oils are purified through sedimentation, filtration, centrifugation, vacuum treatment and adsorption purification.

Sedimentation is precipitation of solid particles and water to the bottom of oil tanks under gravity. The main drawback of this process is its longevity.

Filtration is a partial removal of solid particles through filter medium. Oil filtration systems generally use a multistage filtration with coarse and fine filters.

Centrifugation is separation of oil and water, or oil and solid particles by centrifugal forces.

Vacuum treatment degasses and dehydrates industrial oil. This method is well suited for removing dispersed and dissolved water, as well as dissolved gases.

Adsorption purification, in contrast to the methods mentioned above, does not remove solid particles and gases, but it shows good results at removing water, oil sludge and aging products. This process uses adsorbents of natural or artificial origin: bleaching clays, synthetic aluminosilicates, silica gels, zeolites, etc.

== Differences between industrial oil purification and regeneration ==
Often the terms "oil purification" and "oil regeneration" are used synonymously, although in fact they are not the same. Oil purification cleans oil from contaminants. Oil purification can be used independently or as a part of oil regeneration. Oil regeneration also removes aging products (with the help of adsorbents) and stabilizes oil with additives. Regenerated oil is clean from carcinogenic products of oil aging and stabilized with the help of additives.
