= Fiberize =

Manufacturing process

Fiberization is a manufacturing process that has been used to make objects such as insulation, asphalt, and mineral wool. Optical fiber wiring is created using this method as well.

== Definition ==
The term "fiberization" is used to describe several similar processes. In general, molten plastic or other fiberizable materials are extruded to form a fibrous mass, which is then post-processed through varying methods.

=== Rotary Fiberization ===
Possibly the most common form of fiberization, rotary fiberization utilizes centrifugal force to form fibers. A hollowed wheel with many small holes is injected with whatever molten material is being fiberized. The wheel must by necessity include vents for the hot gases as well. One design for rotary fiberization places slits in a central bore-axle that lets the hot gases escape. As the centrifugal force squeezes the molten material out of the holes, it is severed from the wheel by a sharp blade. As the fibers are collected, several post-processes can be applied, such as grouping or bunching.

=== New research ===
New research makes possible the fiberization of silicate melts in an acoustic field. These silicate metals become super-fine in such conditions, and have great potential in the microelectronic field.
