= Wiley mill =

Type of grinding mill

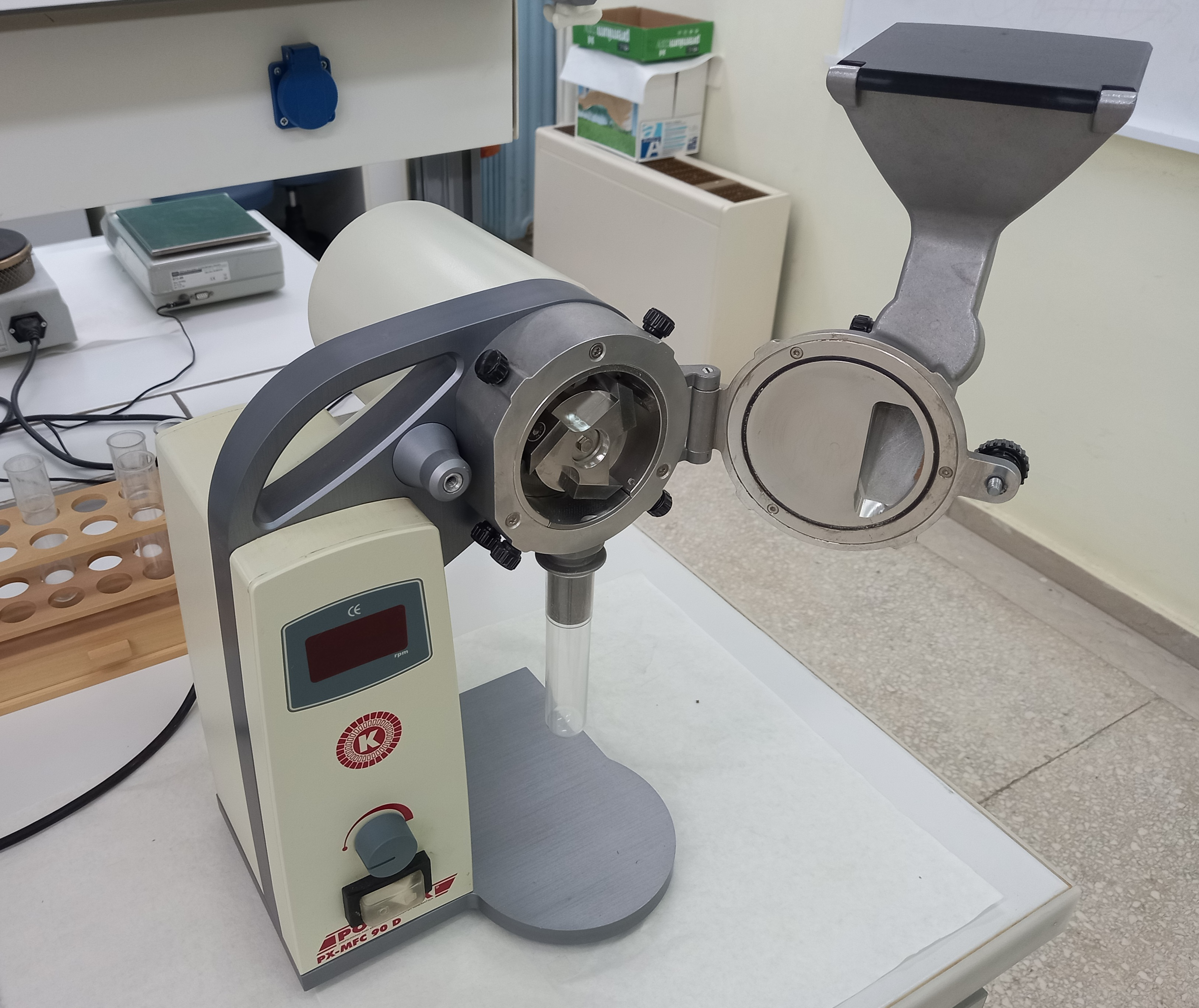
A laboratory Wiley mill

The Wiley mill is a laboratory-scale machine for grinding materials to a powder, and belongs to the family of cutting mills. These mills prepare materials for analysis with minimal moisture loss. Well-dried samples are preferred. In the grinding mill, the material is loaded cut into crude pieces or lumps and loaded into a hopper. From the hopper, the material drops by gravity into the path of a set of revolving hard tool steel blades driven by an electric motor. The revolving knives work against stationary knives and the resulting powder is forced through a steel screen. The powdered material then drops into a waiting collection vessel underneath.

The Wiley mill is most commonly used in agriculture and soil science laboratories but can be used on a wide variety of materials. The Wiley mill was originally designed for grinding fertilizer materials, animal hair, hoofs and other materials.

== Materials ==
The hard, tool steel cutting edges of the knives of a Wiley mill allow for milling a wide range of materials, including plant-based and fibrous materials such as soft and dry wood, particles or sawdust, leaves, stems, and roots, bark and grasses, forage samples (like hay, silage), seeds (like wheat, rice, corn), and also, straw and other lignocellulosic biomass. However, materials that are not recommended, include oily seeds (like soybeans, flax, sunflower), fresh or moist biomass (which may gum up the screen or blades), plastics and metals, bones or mineral-rich samples (which can damage the blades), and highly abrasive materials.
