= Three roll mill =

Class of machinery

A three roll mill or triple roll mill is a machine that uses shear force created by three horizontally positioned rolls rotating in opposite directions and different speeds relative to each other, in order to mix, refine, disperse, or homogenize viscous materials fed into it.

The three-roll mill has proven to be the most successful of the range of roll mills which saw extensive development in the 19th century. These included the single-roll mill and the five-roll mill. The single-roll mill works by material passing between the roll and a fixed bar pressing against the roll. The five-roll mill incorporates four successively smaller in-running nips and hence, compared to the three-roll mill, allows the use of larger agglomerates as part of the input material- but is correspondingly more complicated and expensive.

== Operation of a three roll mill ==
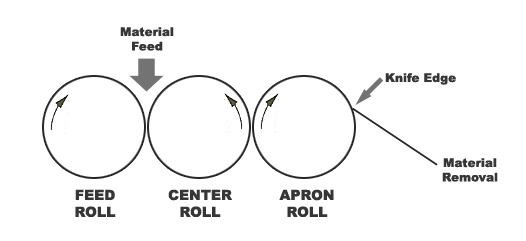

The three adjacent rolls of a three roll mill (called the feed roll, centre roll and apron roll) rotate at progressively higher speeds. Material, usually in the form of paste, is fed between the feed roll and the center roll. Due to the narrowing space between the rolls, most of the paste initially remains in the feed region. The part that makes it through the first in-running nip experiences very high shear force due to the different rotation speeds of the two rolls. Upon exiting, the material that remains on the center roll moves through the second nip between the center roll and apron roll. This subjects it to an even higher shear force, due to the higher speed of the apron roll and typically, a smaller gap than between the feed and centre rolls. A knife blade then scrapes the processed material off the apron roll and the paste rolls down the apron. This milling cycle can be repeated several times to maximize dispersion.

The gaps between the rolls can be mechanically or hydraulically adjusted and maintained. Typically, the gap distance is far greater than the particle size. In some operations, the gap distance is gradually decreased to achieve the desired level of dispersion. The rollers are normally internally water-cooled.

== Application ==
Three roll mills are widely used to mix printing inks, electronic thick film inks, high performance ceramics, cosmetics, plastisols, carbon/graphite, paints, pharmaceuticals, chemicals, glass coatings, dental composites, pigment, coatings, adhesives, sealants, and foods. With the recent development in technology, they are also utilized in the production of cable cover, electronics, soap, and artificial plastics.

Small bench models are used for bench-top development work, laboratory work, and low volume production. Larger bench and floor models are built to meet different production needs from pilot plants to large volume productions.

Particular advantages of this process are that it allows high-viscosity pastes to be milled, and that the high surface contact with the cooled rollers allow the temperature to remain low despite the high amount of dispersion work being put in. A notable disadvantage is that the large open area of paste on the rollers causes loss of volatiles.
