= Colloid mill =

Type of grinding machine

A colloid mill is a machine that is used to reduce the particle size of a solid in suspension in a liquid, or to reduce the droplet size in emulsions. Colloid mills work on the rotor-stator principle: a rotor turns at high speeds (2000–18000 RPM). A high level of hydraulic shear stress is applied on the fluid which results in disrupting and breaking down the structure. Colloid mills are frequently used to increase the stability of suspensions and emulsions, but can also be used to reduce the particle size of solids in suspensions. Higher shear rates lead to smaller droplets, down to approximately 1 μm which are more resistant to emulsion separation.

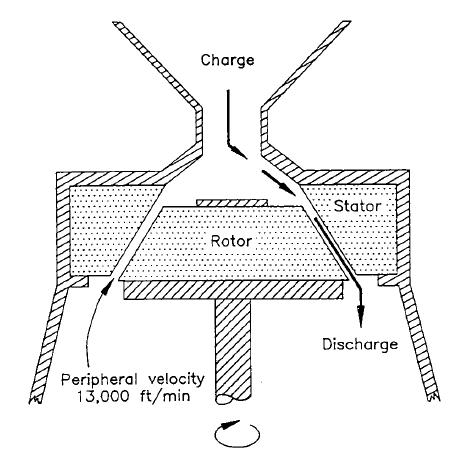
Schematic colloid mill

== Application suitability ==
Colloid mills are used in the following industries:

- Pharmaceutical
- Cosmetic
- Paint
- Soap
- Textile
- Paper
- Food
- Grease

== Rotor - stator construction ==
A colloidal mill consist of a high speed rotor and stator with a conical milling surfaces

- 1 stage toothed
- 3 stage toothed

== Execution ==
- fix gap
- adjustable gap

== See also ==
- Homogenization (chemistry)
