= Comminution =

Reduction of solid materials to a smaller average particle size

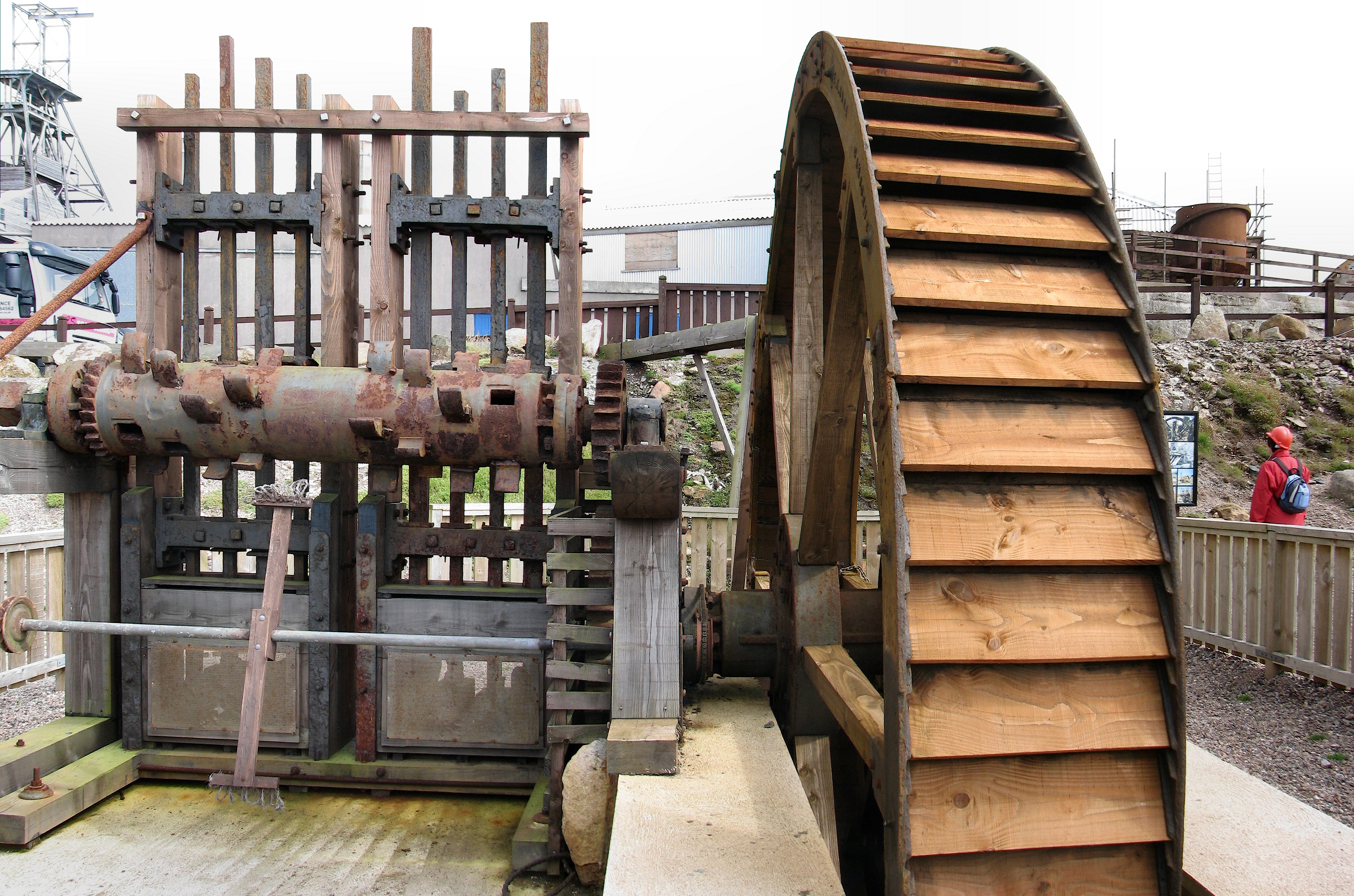
Mineral crusher (left) used in 19th century Cornwall for comminution of tin ore; driven by water mill (right)

Comminution is the reduction of solid materials from one average particle size to a smaller average particle size, by crushing, grinding, cutting, vibrating, or other processes. Comminution is related to pulverization and grinding. All use mechanical devices, and many types of mills have been invented. Concomitant with size reduction, comminution increases the surface area of the solid.

For example, a pulverizer mill is used to pulverize coal for combustion in the steam-generating furnaces of coal power plants. A cement mill produces finely ground ingredients for portland cement. A hammer mill is used on farms for grinding grain and chaff for animal feed. A demolition pulverizer is an attachment for an excavator to break up large pieces of concrete. Comminution is important in mineral processing, where rocks are broken into small particles to help liberate the ore from gangue. Comminution or grinding is also important in ceramics, electronics, and battery research. Mechanical pulping is a traditional way for paper making from wood. The mastication of food involves comminution. From the perspective of chemical engineering, comminution is a unit operation.

In geology, comminution refers to a natural process during faulting in the upper part of the Earth's crust.

== Energy requirements ==
The comminution of solid materials consumes energy. Approximately 65% of the power for the production of cement is consumed in comminution.

The comminution energy can be estimated by:

- Rittinger's law, which assumes that the energy consumed is proportional to the newly generated surface area;
- Kick's law, which related the energy to the sizes of the feed particles and the product particles;
- Bond's law, which assumes that the total work useful in breakage is inversely proportional to the square root of the diameter of the product particles, [implying] theoretically that the work input varies as the length of the new cracks made in breakage.
- Holmes's law, which modifies Bond's law by substituting the square root with an exponent that depends on the material.

Three forces are typically used to effect the comminution of particles: impact, shear, and compression.

== Methods ==
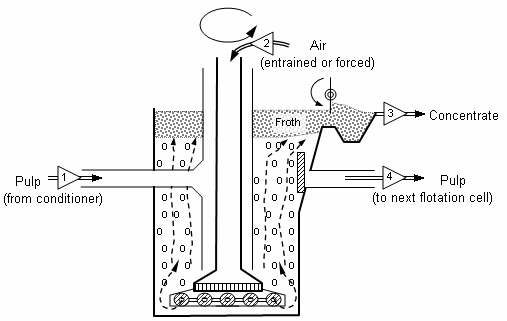
Diagram of froth flotation cell used to process ores after communition. A mixture of ore and water called pulp [1] enters the cell from a conditioner, and flows to the bottom of the cell. Air [2] or nitrogen is passed down a vertical impeller where shearing forces break the air stream into small bubbles. The mineral concentrate froth is collected from the top of the cell [3], while the pulp [4] flows to another cell.

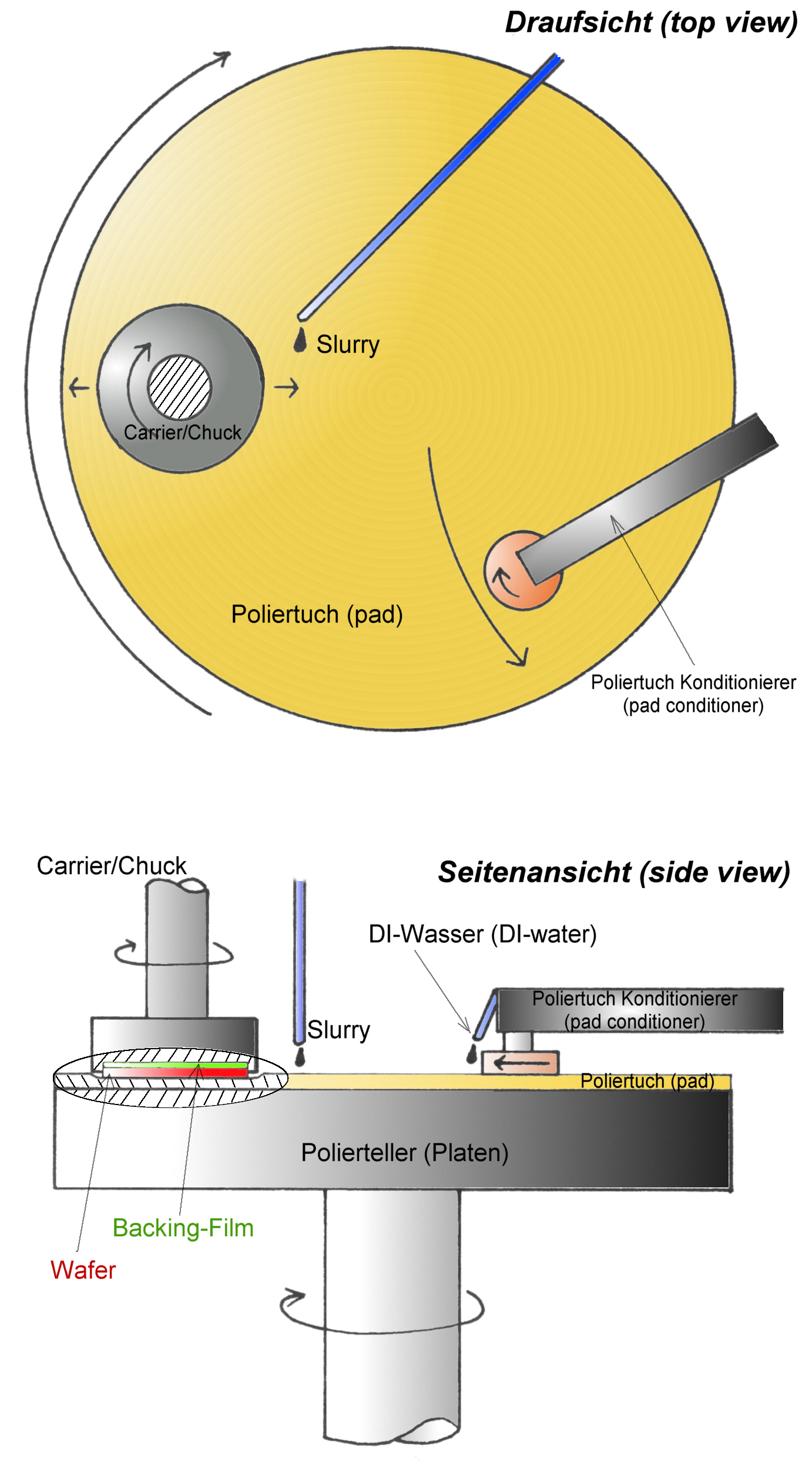
Idealized image of chemical mechanical polishing, a kind of grinding.

There are several methods of comminution. Comminution of solid materials requires various types of crushers and mills depending on the feed properties such as hardness at various size ranges and application requirements such as throughput and maintenance. The most common machines for the comminution of coarse feed material (primary crushers) are the jaw crusher (1m > P_{80} > 100 mm), cone crusher (P_{80} > 20 mm) and hammer crusher. Primary crusher products in intermediate feed particle size ranges (100mm > P80 > 20mm) can be ground in autogenous (AG) or semi-autogenous (SAG) mills depending on feed properties and application requirements. For comminution of finer particle size ranges (20mm > P_{80} > 30 μm) machines like the ball mill, vertical roller mill, hammer mill, roller press or high compression roller mill, vibration mill, jet mill and others are used. For yet finer grind sizes (sometimes referred to as "ultrafine grinding"), specialist mills such as the IsaMill are used.

Trituration, for instance, is comminution (or substance breakdown) by rubbing. Furthermore, methods of trituration include levigation, which is the trituration of a powder with a non-solvent liquid, and pulverization by intervention, which is trituration with a solvent that can be easily removed after the substance has been broken down.

== See also ==
- Mill (grinding) – Device that breaks solid materials into smaller pieces by grinding, crushing, or cutting
- Particle size distribution – Function representing relative sizes of particles in a system
- Crusher – Machine designed to reduce large objects into smaller ones
- Electromagnetic vortex intensifier with ferromagnetic particles - Special equipment for ultrafine grinding
- Burr mill
