= Rous =

Rous may refer to:

- Baron Rous, in the peerage of Great Britain
- R.O.U.S., or "Rodent of Unusual Size," a creature from the book and film The Princess Bride
- Rous Cup, a football competition

== Places ==
Australia

- Rous, New South Wales
- Rous County, New South Wales
- Rous River, New South Wales
- Electoral district of Rous, New South Wales

== People ==
- Anthony Rous (1605–1677), English politician
- Ashley Rous (born 1998), American fashion influencer better known as Bestdressed
- Didier Rous (born 1970), French professional road bicycle racer
- Edmund Rous (by 1521-1569 or later), English politician
- Elie Rous (born 1909), English, or French, football manager
- Francis Rous (1579–1659), English politician and a prominent Puritan
- Francis Peyton Rous (1879–1970), American pathologist and Nobel Prize recipient
- Henry John Rous (1795–1877), Royal Navy officer and sportsman
- John Rous (disambiguation)
- Samuel H. Rous (1864–1947), American singer who performed as S. H. Dudley
- Stanley Rous (1895–1986), the 6th President of FIFA
- William Rous (disambiguation)
