= John Rous (disambiguation) =

John Rous (1710–1760) was a British naval officer.

John Rous may also refer to:

== Members of Parliament ==
- John Rous (Huntingdon MP), MP for Huntingdon in 1401
- John Rous (Ipswich MP), MP for Ipswich in 1410 and 1414
- John Rous (Wiltshire MP) (died c. 1454), MP for Wiltshire in 1420
- Sir John Rous (Dunwich MP, died 1652) (1586–1652), MP for Dunwich, 1624–1626
- Sir John Rous, 1st Baronet (c. 1608–1670), MP for Dunwich, 1660–1670
- John Rous (Warwick MP) (c. 1618–1680), MP for Warwick in 1660

== Others ==
- John Rous (historian) (1411/1420–1492), English chronicler
- John Rouse (librarian) (1574–1652), or Rous, English librarian
- John Rous, 1st Earl of Stradbroke (1750–1827), British aristocrat, racehorse owner and MP for Suffolk
- John Rous, 2nd Earl of Stradbroke (1794–1886), British aristocrat, son of the above
- John Rous, 4th Earl of Stradbroke (1903–1983), British aristocrat, grandson of the above

== See also ==
- John Rouse (disambiguation)
- Henry John Rous (1795–1877), British Royal Navy admiral, son of the 1st Earl of Stradbroke
