= Keith Rous, 6th Earl of Stradbroke =

British peer (born 1937)

Robert Keith Rous, 6th Earl of Stradbroke (born 25 March 1937) is a British peer who has lived much of his life in Australia, where he became a sheep farmer of some 15,000 acres in southern Victoria. A member of the House of Lords from July 1983 to November 1999, he rarely attended it.

== Early life ==
The son of William Keith Rous, younger brother of the fourth earl, and his first wife Pamela Catherine Mabell Kay-Shuttleworth, a granddaughter of Ughtred Kay-Shuttleworth, 1st Baron Shuttleworth, and a sister of the 4th Baron, he was educated at Harrow School.

== Life in Australia ==
About 1957, Rous emigrated to Australia, to escape from his family and from a feud between his father and his uncle. He made a fortune in land speculation. His reason for settling in Victoria may have been that his grandfather, George Rous, 3rd Earl of Stradbroke, had been Governor of the state. His uncle, John Rous, 4th Earl of Stradbroke, was Lord Lieutenant of Suffolk from 1948 to 1978.

=== Peerage ===
On 14 July 1983, his father succeeded an older brother, the 4th Earl, to the peerages, and the young Rous was formally styled as Viscount Dunwich; but four days later his father also died, and he became Earl of Stradbroke himself. As well as succeeding to the peerages, a baronetcy, and a seat in the House of Lords, he also inherited his uncle's Henham Park estate of 3,500 acres in Suffolk, with some fifty houses and cottages, although his uncle had demolished the former family seat, Henham Hall, in 1953. However, this inheritance led to a long legal battle in England.

The son-in-law of the fourth earl called Stradbroke "a malicious liar" after he had called the Henham estate "very down-at-heel, after decades of mismanagement". This led to a libel action in which Stradbroke was awarded £40,000 in damages. During the trial, the new earl from Australia featured in the tabloid press, wearing a bush hat and lacing his comments with such expressions as "fair dinkum". But his plans for a new country house were turned down, so Stradbroke set up home in a tent, and then later in a two-bedroom cottage. For nine years, he divided his life between Australia and England.

By 2000, Stradbroke was back in Australia, living at Mount Fyans Station, Dundonnell, near Mortlake, Victoria, Australia, a sheep station of almost 15,000 acres, with an eight-bedroom homestead built in the 1880s.

In 2015, Stradbroke announced that he was selling his Mount Fyans property. A newspaper report commented that the property was famous, its owner "cheekily infamous". The sale price was later reported as some $34 million.

He continues to own the Henham Park estate in Suffolk, and has developed it.

== Personal life ==
On 3 September 1960, Stradbroke married firstly Dawn Antoinette Beverley, a daughter of Thomas Edward Beverley. They were divorced in 1976, having had seven children:

- Robert Keith Rous, Viscount Dunwich (born 1961)
- Lady Ingrid Arnel Rous (1963)
- Lady Sophia Rayner Rous (1964)
- Lady Heidi Simone Rous (1966)
- Lady Pamela Keri Rous (1968)
- Lady Brigitte Aylena Rous (1970)
- Hon Wesley Alexander Rous (1972)

In 1977, he married secondly Roseanna Mary Blanche Reitman, a daughter of Francis Reitman and Susan Diana Mary Vernon, and they had eight children:

- Hon Hektor Fraser Rous (1978)
- Lady Zea Katherina Rous (1979)
- Hon Maximilian Otho Rous (1981)
- Hon Henham Mowbray Rous (1983)
- Hon Winston Walberswick Rous (1986)
- Lady Minsmere Mathilda Rous (1988)
- Hon Yoxford Ulysses Uluru Rous (1989)
- Hon Ramsar Fyans Rous (1992)

Stradbroke had a younger brother who took up a career in the British Army and became Lieutenant General The Hon Sir William Rous, regimental colonel of the Coldstream Guards.
