= Thomas Barlow (bishop) =

English academic and clergyman

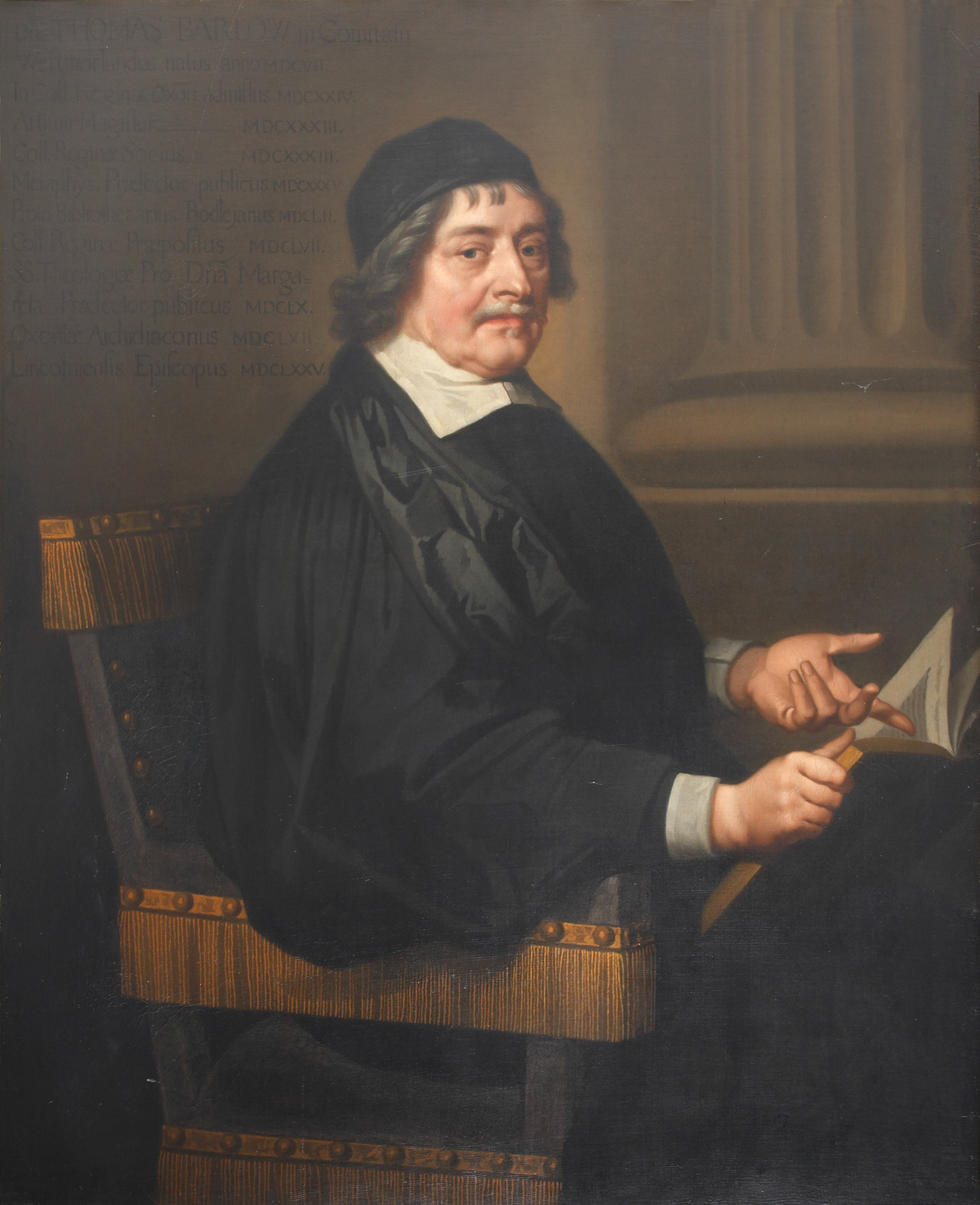
A portrait of Thomas Barlow (c. 1672 to 1675)

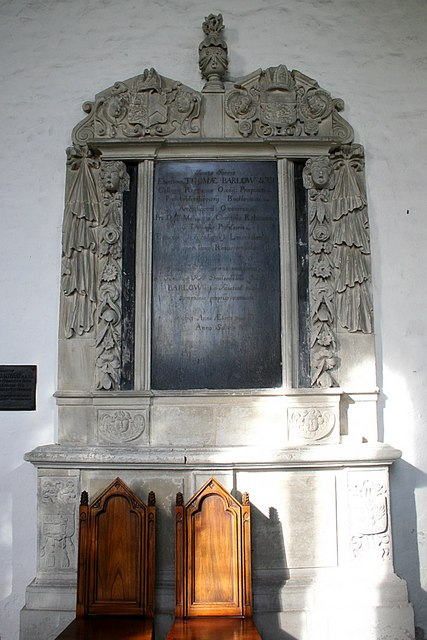
Monument to Thomas Barlow, St Mary's Church, Buckden, Cambridgeshire

Thomas Barlow (1607, 1608 or 1609 – 8 October 1691) was an English academic and clergyman, who became Provost of The Queen's College, Oxford, and Bishop of Lincoln. He was seen in his own time and by Edmund Venables in the Dictionary of National Biography to have been a trimmer (conforming politically for advancement's sake), and have a reputation mixed with his academic and other writings on casuistry. His views were Calvinist and strongly anti-Catholic – he was among the last English bishops to dub the Pope Antichrist. He worked in the 1660s for "comprehension" of nonconformists, but supported a crackdown in the mid-1680s. Despite his anti-Catholic prejudices, Barlow declared loyalty to James II of England upon his accession.

== Early life ==
Barlow was the son of Richard Barlow of Long-gill in the parish of Orton, Eden in Westmorland (now Cumbria). He was educated at Appleby grammar school. Aged 16, he entered Queen's College, Oxford, as a servitor, rising to be a tabarder (scholar). He took his BA degree in 1630 and his MA in 1633, when he was elected a fellow of his college. In 1635 he was appointed metaphysical reader to the university, being seen as a master of casuistry, logic, and philosophy. Among his pupils was John Owen.

He associated at Oxford with Robert Sanderson and particularly with Robert Boyle, who made Oxford his chief residence from 1654 to 1668. Barlow was a learned Calvinist, who opposed Jeremy Taylor and George Bull, and with Thomas Tully was one of the guardians in Interregnum Oxford of acceptable orthodoxy. On the death of John Rouse, Barlow was elected to the librarianship of the Bodleian on 6 April 1652, a post he held until he succeeded to the Lady Margaret professorship in 1660. He favoured the scholars Anthony à Wood, Anthony Horneck, whom he had appointed as chaplain in Queen's, and Thomas Fuller, and was hospitable to Christopher Davenport. He spoke of infant baptism in a letter to John Tombes, which later affected his prospect of preferment.

Barlow retained his fellowship in 1648 with support from John Selden and his former pupil John Owen, having contributed anonymously a tract on the parliamentary visitation of Oxford in that year. He became Provost of his college in 1657. In 1658 he brought tactful support to Sanderson on behalf of Boyle.

== Under Charles II ==
On the Restoration, Barlow was one of the commissioners for restoring the members of the university who had been ejected in 1648 and expelling the intruders. On behalf of John Owen, molested for preaching in his own house, he mediated with Edward Hyde, the Lord Chancellor. Henry Wilkinson was removed as Lady Margaret Professor of Divinity on 25 September 1660, in favour of Barlow. A few days before, on 1 September, he had taken his degree of D.D., one of a batch of loyalists created doctors by royal mandate. On the death of Barton Holiday in 1661, Barlow was appointed Archdeacon of Oxford, but there was a delay caused by a dispute between him and Thomas Lamplugh, ultimately decided in Barlow's favour, who was eventually installed on 13 June 1664. Barlow meanwhile was accused by Wood of underhand meddling in the election of Thomas Clayton to the wardenship of Merton College in 1661.

Barlow wrote at the request of Robert Boyle an elaborate treatise on "Toleration in Matters of Religion" at this time, but it was not published until after his death (in Cases of Conscience, 1692). Barlow's reasoning is based more on expediency than on principle. He shows that the religious toleration he advocates does not extend to atheists, papists or Quakers. Earlier, when Jews were applying to Cromwell for readmission into England, Barlow had composed "at the request of a person of quality" a tract on "Toleration of the Jews in a Christian State", published in the same collection. On the other hand, Barlow was one of a group of Oxford grandees hostile to the Royal Society, along with John Fell, Obadiah Walker, and Thomas Pierce. He was an enemy of the "new philosophy" (as propounded by leading Royal Society members), giving as his confessional reasons that it was "impious if not plainly atheistic, set on foot and carried on by the arts of Rome," so designing to ruin the Protestant faith by disabling men from defending the truth. He noted the Catholic background of Descartes, Gassendi, Mersenne and Du Hamel. His Directions to a young Divine for his Study of Divinity of this period contain a catalogue of theological works classified by subjects, with remarks on their value and character.

As pro-vice-chancellor of the university in 1673, he called in question William Richards, Chaplain of All Souls College, for Arminian doctrine in a sermon at St Mary's. He censured on doctrinal lines the publication of George Bull's Harmonia Apostolica. He wrote much in this period, but published little. Mr. Cottington's Divorce Case, on which Barlow's reputation as an ecclesiastical lawyer and casuistic divine mainly rests, was written in 1671.

Barlow was prominent in two abortive schemes of comprehension (inclusion into the state church) set on foot in October 1667 and February 1668. The "Comprehensive Bill", based on the Declaration of Breda, was drawn up by Sir Robert Atkyns and Sir Matthew Hale, and revised and endorsed by Barlow and his friend John Wilkins. Its introduction was frustrated by a Commons declaration and the plan was finally dropped. Barlow had some part in the release of John Bunyan from Bedford gaol in 1677.

In 1675, Barlow became Bishop of Lincoln through the good offices of two secretaries of state, Sir Joseph Williamson and Henry Coventry, both graduates of Queen's College, the latter having been his pupil; Gilbert Sheldon was opposed. Barlow's consecration (on 27 June) did not occur in the customary Lambeth Chapel, but in the chapel attached to the Holborn palace of the Bishop of Ely (then Peter Gunning). George Morley of Winchester was the consecrating prelate. Barlow resided mostly at Buckden Palace, near Huntingdon, and was accused of never having entered his own cathedral. The Bishop's Palace at Lincoln had still not been repaired after the damage done in the English Civil War, although George Savile, 1st Marquess of Halifax remonstrated with Barlow on the subject in 1684.

Barlow told his friend Sir Peter Pett that the real ground of hostility was not his avoidance of Lincoln, but his continuing hostility to Catholicism. In 1678, when Titus Oates forwarded his theory of a Popish Plot, Barlow had publicly declared enmity to the papists and their supposed leader, James, Duke of York. When the bill enforcing a test against popery was introduced, which excluded such peers from the House of Lords, Gunning of Ely defended the church of Rome from the charge of idolatry, but Barlow answered him vehemently. In 1680, while the Popish Plot panic was still at its height, he republished under the title of Brutum Fulmen, the papal bulls of Pope Pius V and Pope Paul III, pronouncing the excommunication and deposition of Queen Elizabeth and of Henry VIII, with inflammatory comments, and learned proofs that "the pope is the great Antichrist, the man of sin, and the son of perdition." In 1682 appeared Barlow's answer to "whether the Turk or pope be the greater Antichrist." He confirmed this in a letter of 1684 to the Earl of Anglesey, arguing again that "the pope is Antichrist."

When in 1684 Henry Viscount St John was convicted of killing Sir William Estcourt in a brawl, and Charles II used the royal prerogative for his pardon, Bishop Barlow published an elaborate tract (1684–1685) in support of regal power to dispense with penal laws. This was succeeded by "a case of conscience", proving that kings and supreme powers had authority to dispense with the positive precept condemning murderers to death. In the same year (1684), as the persecutions of nonconformists increased in violence and the quarter sessions of Bedford published "a sharp order" enforcing strict conformity, Barlow issued a letter to the clergy of his diocese requiring them to publish the order in their churches. A "free answer" was written to this letter by John Howe.

== Under James II ==
When the Catholic James II became king, Barlow swiftly declared loyal affection to the new sovereign. When James issued his first declaration for liberty of conscience, Barlow was one of four bishops who sent an address of thanks to the sovereign and caused it to be signed by 600 of his clergy. He also issued a letter defending his conduct. James Gardiner, then sub-dean, was a strong whig and refused to sign the address, but on the appearance of the second declaration of 1688, Barlow addressed an equivocal letter to his clergy (on 29 May 1688).

== Under William and Mary ==
William and Mary, on coming to the throne, demanded a new oath of hostility toward Rome. Barlow voted with the bishops that James had abdicated and took the oaths to his successors. He was reportedly ready to replace non-jurors in his diocese. Barlow died at Buckden on 8 October 1691 aged 84 and was buried in the chancel of the parish church, by his own desire in the same grave as his predecessor William Barlow. A monument on the north wall commemorates both in an epitaph of his composition.

== Works ==
Thomas Barlow's writings include:

- Exercitationes aliquot metaphysicae de Deo (1637)
- Plain reasons why a Protestant of the Church of England should not turn Roman Catholic (1688)
- Cases of Conscience (1692)

== Library Collections ==
At his death in 1691, Barlow bequeathed 54 manuscript volumes and a variety of printed books to the Bodleian Library. About 600 books from Barlow's collection, especially duplicates (books already owned by the Bodleian) went to the library of Queen's College, Oxford. The printed books from Barlow's library, which was finally assimilated into the Bodleian in 1694, are currently held under the shelfmark "Linc." for Linconiensis, a reference to Barlow's title as the Bishop of Lincoln.

According to William Poole, "Barlow’s books are of especial value because he was a compulsive annotator." A staunch Calvinist, Barlow often made annotations to argue with the theology of the authors he read. Poole adds that Barlow "marked" books as though he were reading "tutorial essays" from students. Barlow's annotations have also been useful to scholars because he often made biographical notes about authors, other works they had written, and other editions of the same work.

Many of the printed books in Barlow's library that are currently held at the Bodleian reflect his interest in theology, the reign of Charles I, and events during the English Civil War and Interregnum. These include many shorter polemical pamphlets and tracts related to volatility in the 1640s and 50s such as

- F 2.63(25) Linc.: A declaration: or, representation from His Excellencie, Sir Tho. Fairfax, and the Army under his command: Humbly tendred to the Parliament concerning the just and fundamental rights and liberties of themselves and the kingdom. (1647)
- C 13.13(45) Linc.: Matters of great note and consequence: 1 Divers questions upon his Majesties last answer concerning the militia resolved upon by both Houses of Parliament to be of dangerous consequence. 2 A true relation of the strange and untimely deathes which hath successively befalen all the nobility and others, which have beene the possessors of Shirborne Castle, in Dorset-shire since that it was unlawfully usurped and taken from the church by King Stephen in Anno Dom. 1100. Which castle is now in the possession of George Lord Digby, and how the case stands with him I leave to the courteous reader to censure. Whereunto is added, certaine articles of high treason against the said Lord Digby (1642)
- C 14 6[9] Linc.: A short story of the rise, reign, and ruine of the Antinomians, familists & libertines, that infected the churches of New-England: and how they were confuted by the Assembly of ministers there: as also of the magistrates proceedings in court against them. Together with Gods strange and remarkable judgements from heaven upon some of the chief fomenters of these opinions; and the lamentable death of Ms. Hutchison. Very fit for these times; here being the same errours amongst us, and acted by the same spirit. Published at the instant request of sundry, by one that was an eye and eare-witnesse of the carriage of matters there. (1644)

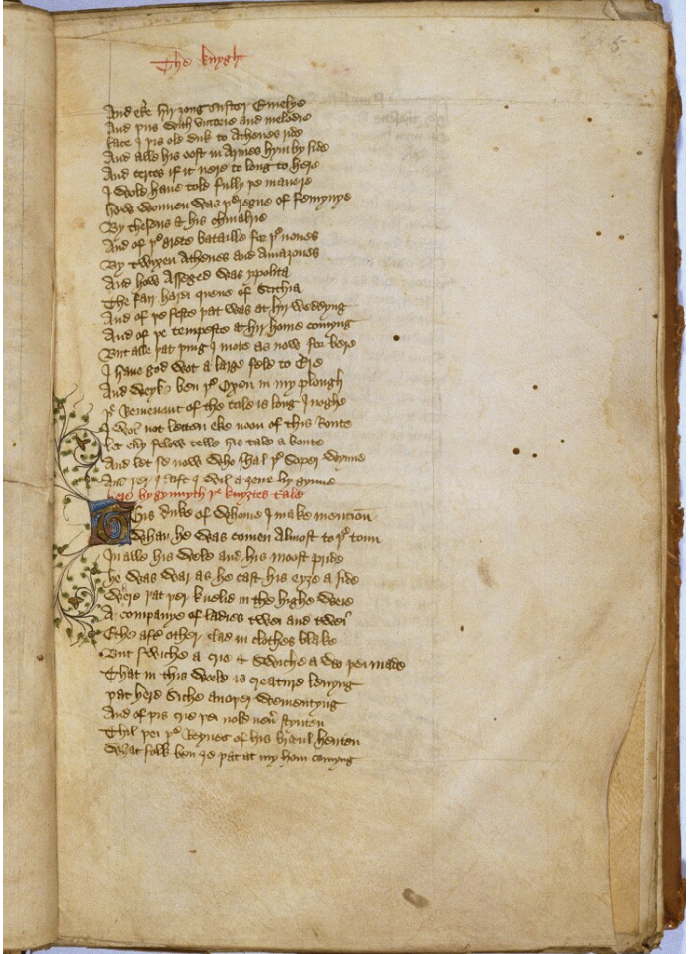
A page from Barlow's manuscript copy of the Canterbury Tales. Oxford, Bodleian Library MS. Barlow 20: https://digital.bodleian.ox.ac.uk/objects/7a0fb04a-8d19-4499-8882-1d8eba966624/

Barlow's manuscripts at the Bodleian cover a range of subjects, genres, and time periods. These include

- Medieval literature:
  - Geoffrey Chaucer's Canterbury Tales (MS Barlow 20)
- Classical rhetoric:
  - Cicero's De inventione rhetorica (MS Barlow 40)
- Church history:
  - Eusebius' Ecclesiastical History (MS Barlow 3)
  - Bede's Historia Ecclesiastica (MS Barlow 39)
- Contemporary theology:
  - The Presbyterian Platforme simply sett downe (MS Barlow 19)
- Papers written by Barlow's fellow Bishop James Ussher whose work Barlow helped edit:
  - MS Barlow 10
  - MS Barlow 13

Church of England titles
Preceded by William Fuller	Bishop of Lincoln; 1675–1691	Succeeded by Thomas Tenison
