= Earl of Stradbroke =

Title in the Peerage of the United Kingdom

Earldom of Stradbroke
- Arms of Rous, Earls of Stradbroke: Sable, a fess dancettée or between three crescents argent
- Creation date: 18 July 1821
- Created by: King George IV
- Peerage: Peerage of the United Kingdom
- First holder: John Rous, 1st Earl of Stradbroke
- Present holder: Keith Rous, 6th Earl of Stradbroke
- Heir apparent: Robert Rous, Viscount Dunwich
- Remainder to: The 1st Earl’s heirs male of the body lawfully begotten
- Subsidiary titles: Viscount Dunwich; Baron Rous; Baronet ‘of Henham’
- Status: Extant
- Former seat: Henham Park
- Motto: JE VIVE EN ESPOIR (I live in hope)

Earl of Stradbroke, in the County of Suffolk, is a title in the Peerage of the United Kingdom. It was created in 1821 for John Rous, 1st Baron Rous, who had earlier represented Suffolk in the House of Commons.

He had already succeeded his father as 6th Rous Baronet (of Henham) in 1771 and been created Baron Rous, of Dennington in the County of Suffolk, in the Peerage of Great Britain in 1796, and was made Viscount Dunwich, in the County of Suffolk, at the same time he was given the earldom. He was succeeded by his eldest son, the second Earl who notably served as Lord Lieutenant of Suffolk. Admiral Henry John Rous, was the second son of the first Earl.

The third Earl was Governor of Victoria from 1920 to 1926 as well as Lord Lieutenant of Suffolk. He was succeeded by his eldest son, the fourth Earl, who also served as Lord Lieutenant of Suffolk.

As of 2019, the titles are held by the latter's nephew, the sixth Earl, who succeeded his father the 5th Earl in 1983 and until 2016 lived at Mt Fyan's Station, Dundonnell, Victoria, Australia, a 5,900-hectare (14,580 acre) ranch which he purchased in 1989 and sold in 2016 for $ Aus 34 million (£19 million). Lord Stradbroke has been married twice and has fifteen children. His younger brother is Lieutenant General Sir William Rous.

The seat of the Rous family from the early 14th century was Dennington Hall, Woodbridge (near Stradbroke) in Suffolk, in 2015, the residence of Robert Charles Rous, a grandson of the 3rd Earl. The family seat of Henham Hall, near Blythburgh, Suffolk, was demolished in 1953 by the 4th Earl, but the 6th Earl still owns the 4,200-acre park.

== Heraldry ==
The arms of Rous are Sable, a fess dancettée or between three crescents argent; Crest: A Pyramid of Bay Leaves in the form of a cone Vert. Supporters: Dexter: A Lion Argent, maned and tufted Or, gorged with a Wreath of Bay Leaves Vert. Sinister: A Sea-Horse Argent, maned and finned Or, the tail round an Anchor Azure, gorged with a Wreath of Bay Leaves Vert.

== Rous Baronets, of Henham (1660) ==
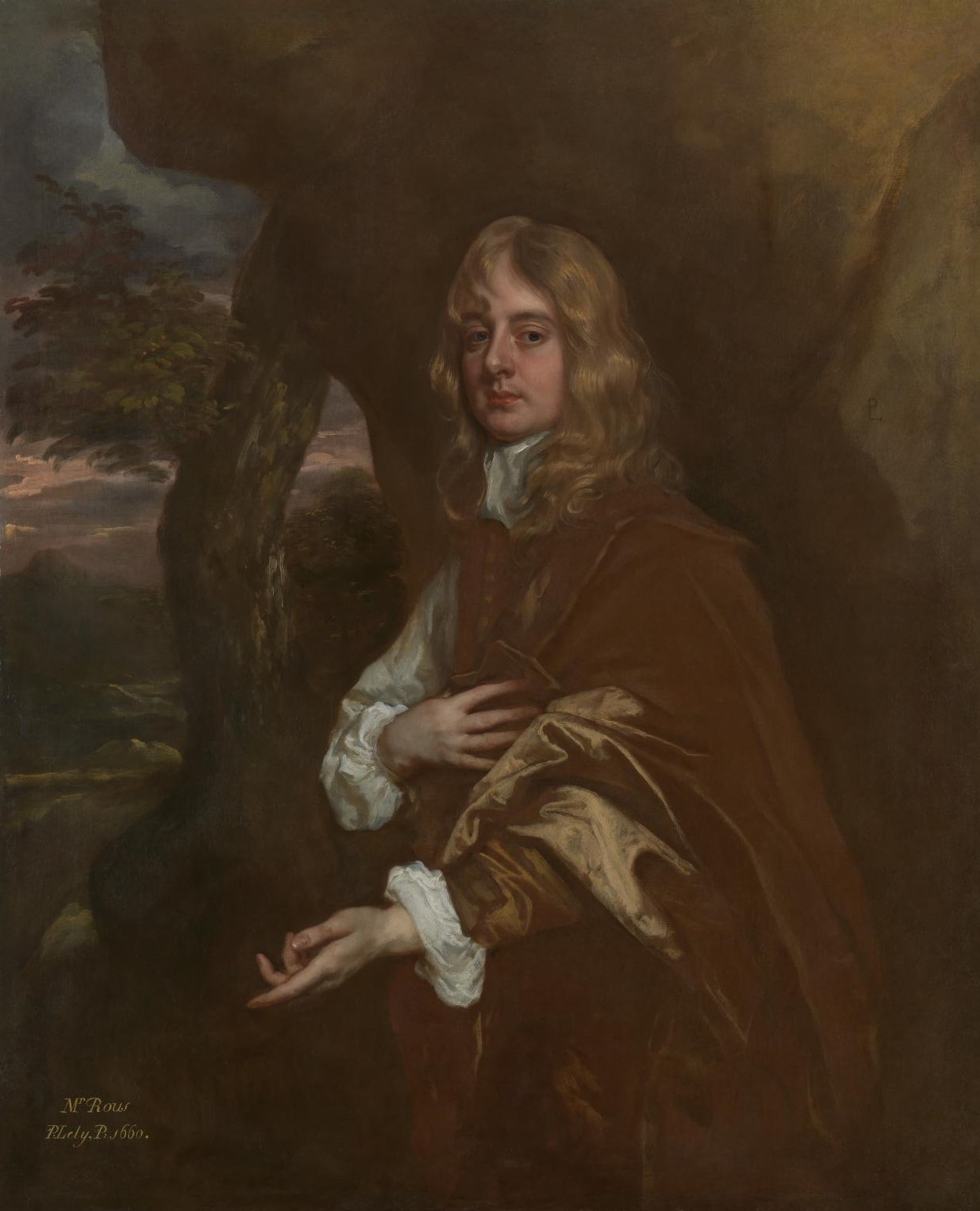
Sir John Rous, 1st Baronet

The Baronetcy, of Henham in the County of Suffolk, was created in the Baronetage of England in 1660 for John Rous. He sat as Member of Parliament for Dunwich and Eye. His son, the second Baronet, represented Dunwich and Suffolk in Parliament. On his death the title passed to his son, the third Baronet. He was Member of Parliament for Dunwich. His nephew, the fifth Baronet, represented Suffolk in the House of Commons. He was succeeded by his son, the aforementioned sixth Baronet, who was later elevated to the peerage.

- Sir John Rous, 1st Baronet (c. 1608–1670)
- Sir John Rous, 2nd Baronet (c. 1656–1730)
- Sir John Rous, 3rd Baronet (c. 1676–1731)
- Sir Robert Rous, 4th Baronet (c. 1687–1735)
- Sir John Rous, 5th Baronet (c. 1727–1771)
- Sir John Rous, 6th Baronet (1750–1827) (created Earl of Stradbroke in 1821)

== Earls of Stradbroke (1821) ==
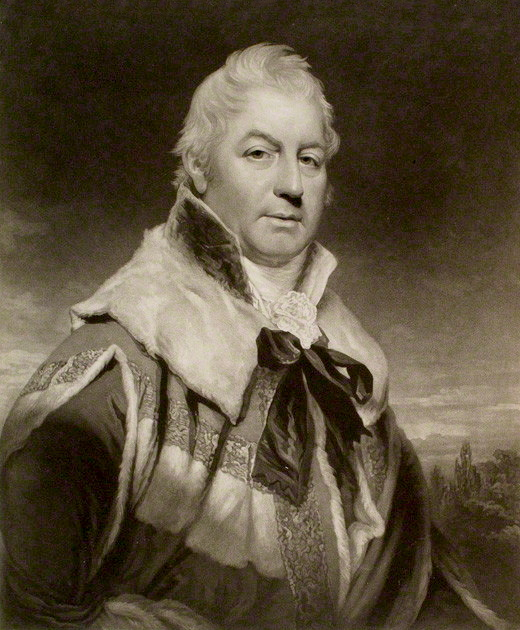
John Rous, 1st Earl of Stradbroke

- John Rous, 1st Earl of Stradbroke (1750–1827)
- John Edward Cornwallis Rous, 2nd Earl of Stradbroke (1794–1886)
- George Edward John Mowbray Rous, 3rd Earl of Stradbroke (1862–1947)
- John Anthony Alexander Rous, 4th Earl of Stradbroke (1903–1983)
- William Keith Rous, 5th Earl of Stradbroke (1907–1983), a Royal Navy officer. He was the Commander of HMS Coltsfoot (K140) from June 1941 until July 1943 and took part in Operation Pedestal.
- Robert Keith Rous, 6th Earl of Stradbroke (b. 1937)

The heir apparent is the present holder's eldest son Robert Keith Rous, Viscount Dunwich (b. 1961).
