= John Rouse =

John Rouse may refer to:

- John Rouse (librarian)
- John Rouse (MP)
- John Rous, or Rouse, privateer and then an officer of the Royal Navy

== See also ==
- John Rous (disambiguation)
