= Grand Henham Steam Rally =

Annual steam rally in England

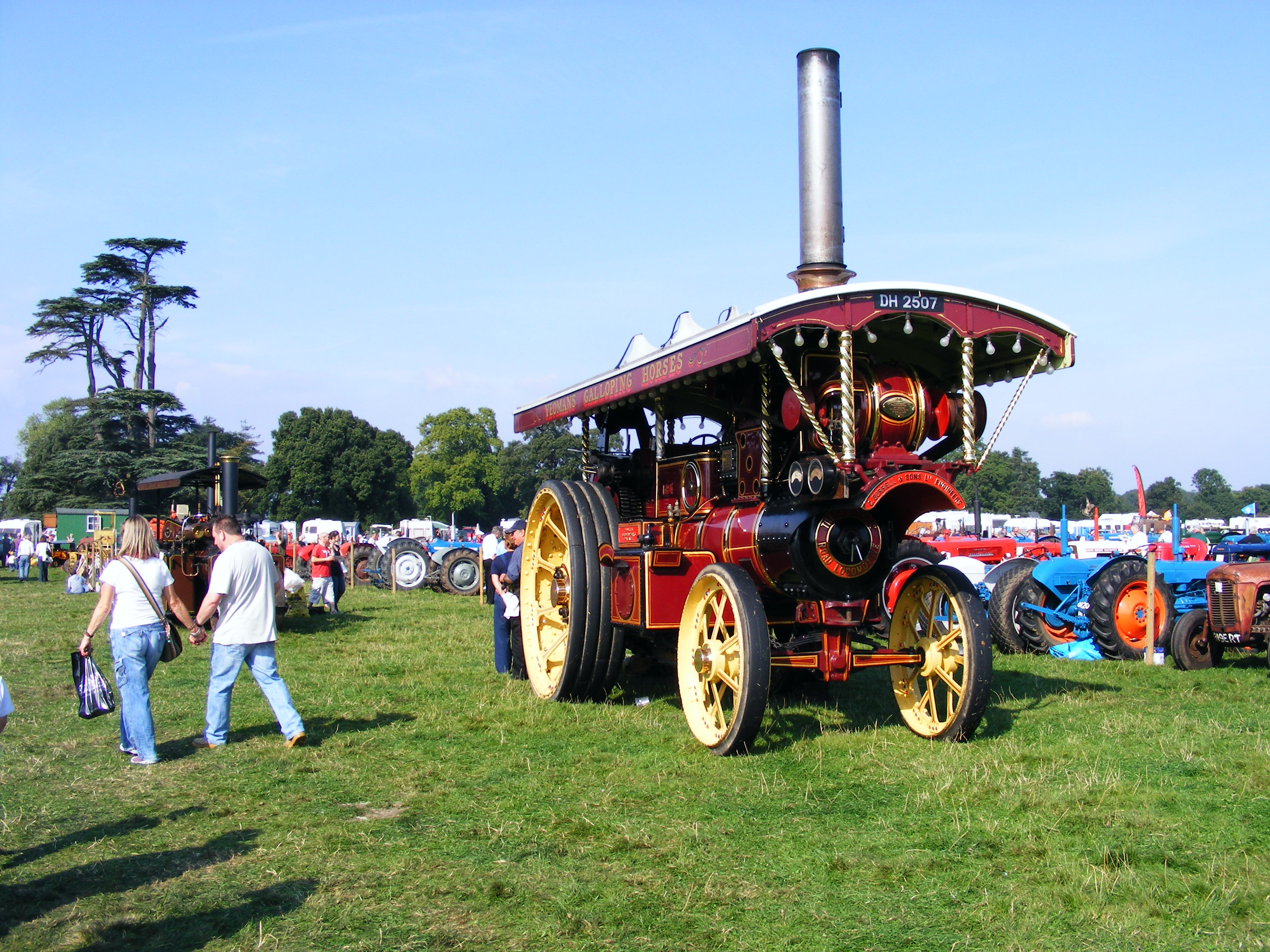
- One of the many Steam Engines at the 2008 Henham Steam Rally
- Genre: festival of steam-powered vehicles and machinery
- Venue: Henham Park
- Location: Suffolk
- Coordinates: 52.344°N 1.599°E
- Country: England
- Website: henhamsteamrally.com

The Grand Henham Steam Rally is a steam rally held every September at Henham Park near Southwold. It features displays of fixed and mobile steam engines and of vintage and classic cars and motorcycles. There are many events and activities, and craft, trade and food stalls. Proceeds are given to local charities. The organiser was forced into liquidation in July 2020.

== Organisation ==
The steam rally was first organised by Len Murray and held at Lower Green Farm, Sotterley. Given the numbers of attendees, and with the support of John Rous, 4th Earl of Stradbroke, the event moved to Henham Park in 1975. The rally is run by the parochial church councils of Wangford-cum-Henham, Uggeshall and Sotherton; the Wangford Community Council and Southwold (Sole Bay) Lions Club. It is usually held in the Henham Park fields, but on five occasions has taken place elsewhere; at Sibton, Brampton, the Norfolk Showground (west of Norwich), Benacre and Trinity Park, Ipswich. There is an entrance fee, and camping in the park is allowed for an additional fee.

The rally is a charity that gives its profits to local organisations. At the 37th rally in September 2012 over £40,000 was raised for local charities. In 2018, profits went to the UK Sepsis Trust, East Anglian Air Ambulance, Wrentham Community First Responders, SERV Suffolk and Cambridgeshire and Southwold Lifeboat Station. In 2019, recipients included Wangford and District Community Council, Southwold (Sole Bay) Lions Club, Parochial Church Councils of Sotherton, Wangford cum Henham and Uggeshall, Lowestoft and Waveney Samaritans, National Trust Dunwich Heath and Beccles and District Guides.

On 9 July 2020, it was reported that Henham Steam Rally Trading Ltd, the company based in Beccles which organised the steam rally, had been wound up because it could not afford to pay for an injury incurred in an accident in 2015. Damages of £76,160 were owing to a Colchester man.

== Attractions ==
Several thousand visitors come to the Grand Henham Steam Rally, which as of 2020 had been run each year for 45 years. Typically there is a bandstand with live music, craft tent and craft stalls, trade stands, food stands and a bar, a vintage fairground, a clown and a Punch and Judy puppet show for children. Displays and demonstrations include steam engines, stationary engines, working agricultural machinery, vintage & classic cars, vintage commercial & military vehicles, tractors and motorcycles.

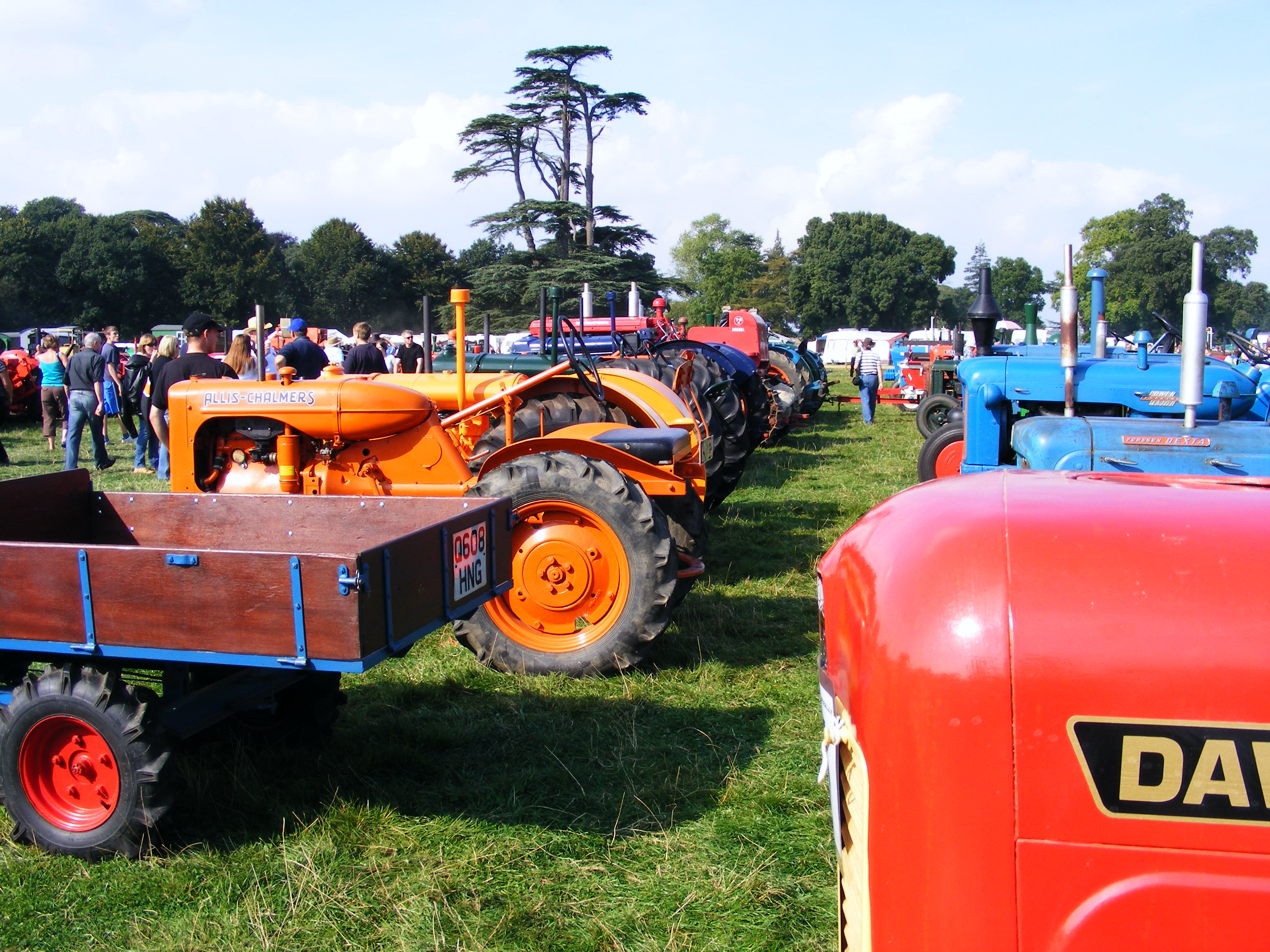
Tractors at the 2008 Henham Steam Rally

In 2012, there was a parade of steam engines followed by the Southwold and Reydon Corps of Drums, a demonstration of kite flying by Team Spectrum, a parade of vintage and classic cars, and a commercial and military vehicle parade. There was a special pageant, From the sickle to the combine harvester, that told of the evolution of harvesting over the ages. In September 2018, the 44th Grand Henham Steam Rally for the first time let attendees drive a steam engine. Another new display was steam roller barrel rolling. The 2018 rally also included a Dog and Duck Show, where trained sheepdogs herded ducks, and a display of working Shires and Suffolk Punch horses. Other events have included a stunt team display, the Ken Fox motorcycle Wall of Death troupe, horse-drawn carriage rides and a dog agility display.

== 2020 and 2021 events ==
The 2020 rally was to have included more than 30 full size and miniature traction engines, steam rollers, lorries and cars. There would be working demonstrations of steam power, including threshing, sawing benches, and stone crushing. The organizing committee for the 2020 rally considered cashless payments, wide one-way aisles to make social distancing practical and greater cleaning, but it steadily became obvious that there would be no way to make the event safe for visitors due to the COVID-19 pandemic. On 3 July 2020 it was decided to cancel the 46th Grand Henham Steam Rally, which was to have been held on 19–20 September 2020, due to government restrictions on large events. The next rally was planned for 18−19 September 2021 at Henham Park.

== Sources ==
- Boggis, Mark (16 September 2012), "photo Gallery: Thousands of people descend on the Henham Estate, between Southwold and Beccles, for the Grand Henham Steam Rally", Beccles and Bungay Journal
- Boggis, Mark (15 September 2018), "Grand Henham Steam rally starts in style as hundreds of people turn out", Lowestoft Journal
- Boggis, Mark (3 July 2020), "Organisers 'difficult decision' to cancel popular rally", Eastern Daily Press
- Grand Henham Steam Rally, Steam & Electric UK
- Grand Henham Steam Rally, Steam Heritage Publishing
- "Grand Henham Steam Rally", Traction Time
- "Henham: Steam rally has plenty of puff", Ipswich Star, 17 September 2012
- Nixon, Matthew (9 July 2020), "Henham steam rally forced into liquidation", East Anglian Daily Times, Archant Community Media Ltd
- Potter, Tom (21 February 2015), "Pastures New for Annual Steam Rally", East Anglian Daily Times, Archant, archived from the original on 15 July 2020
- Rimmer, Judy (14 August 2018), "Steaming ahead with exciting line-up for annual Henham rally", East Anglian Daily Times
- The 46th Grand Henham Steam Rally, Henham Steam Rally, 3 July 2020
