= Drinkstone =

Civil parish in Suffolk, England

Coordinates: 52.21°N 00.85°E

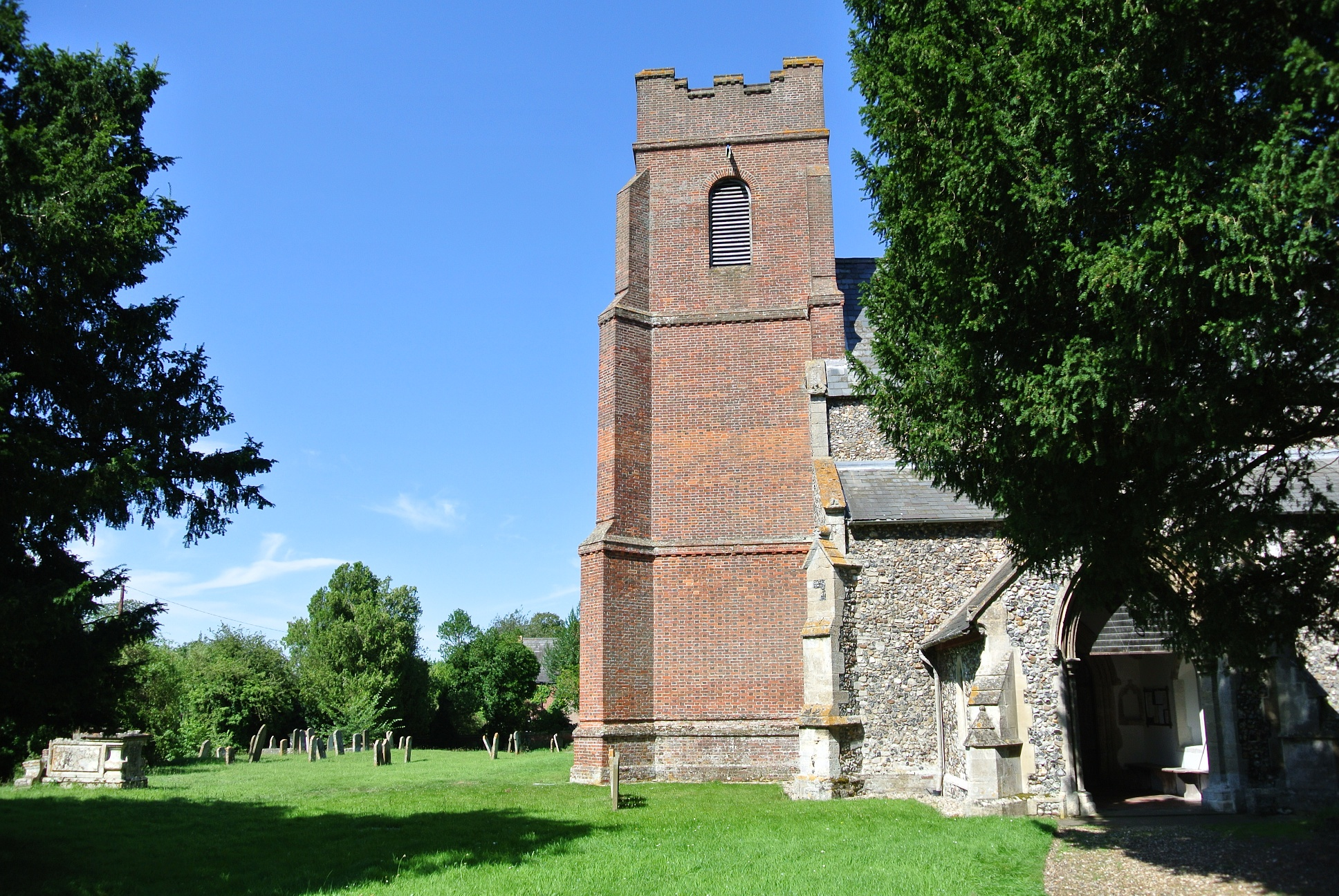
- All Saints' Church, Drinkstone

- Location within Suffolk
- Area: 9.081 km^{2} (3.506 sq mi)
- Population: 548 (2011)
  - Density: 60/km^{2} (160/sq mi)
- OS grid reference: TL9561
- District: Mid Suffolk
- Shire county: Suffolk
- Region: East
- Country: England
- Sovereign state: United Kingdom
- Post town: Bury St. Edmunds
- Postcode district: IP30
- Dialling code: 01449
- Police: Suffolk
- Fire: Suffolk
- Ambulance: East of England

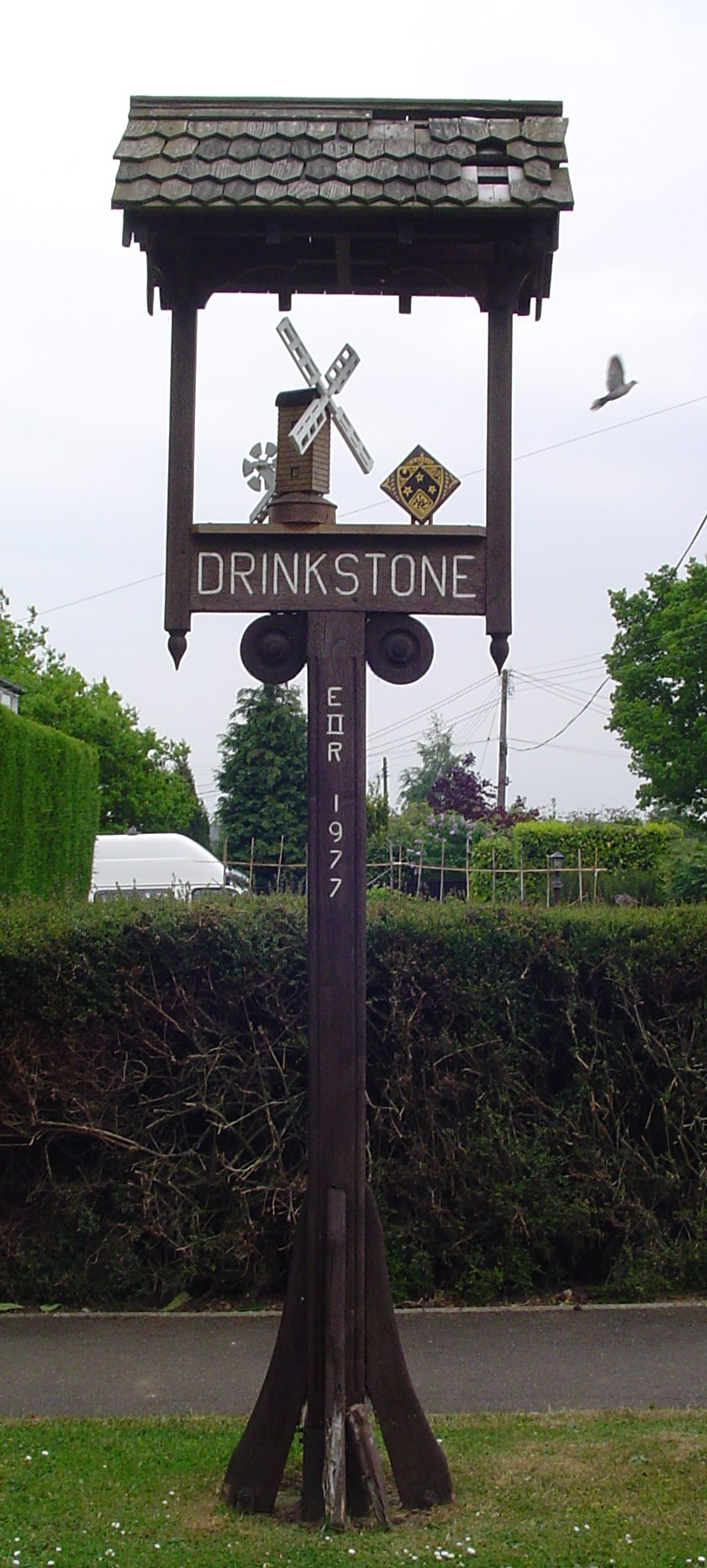
Village sign in Drinkstone

Drinkstone is a small settlement and civil parish in Suffolk, England. Its name is derived from Dremic's homestead. It was located in the hundred of Thedwastre. It is near the A14 road and is 6 miles (10 km) southeast of the town of Bury St Edmunds. It is mentioned in the Domesday Book of 1086.

All Saints' Church dates from the 14th century. The tower was added c.1760 and the church restored in 1866–72. It is a grade II* listed building.

Drinkstone windmills are a pair of windmills in the parish consisting of a post mill and a smock mill.

== Second World War ==
The 2024 Quartermaster Truck Company (Aviation) of the United States Army Air Force was stationed here in 1945.

== Notable people ==
- Joshua Grigby MP, settled in Drinkstone, building a mansion at Drinkstone Park in 1760.
