= John Rous, 2nd Earl of Stradbroke =

British soldier and nobleman

John Edward Cornwallis Rous 2nd Earl of Stradbroke
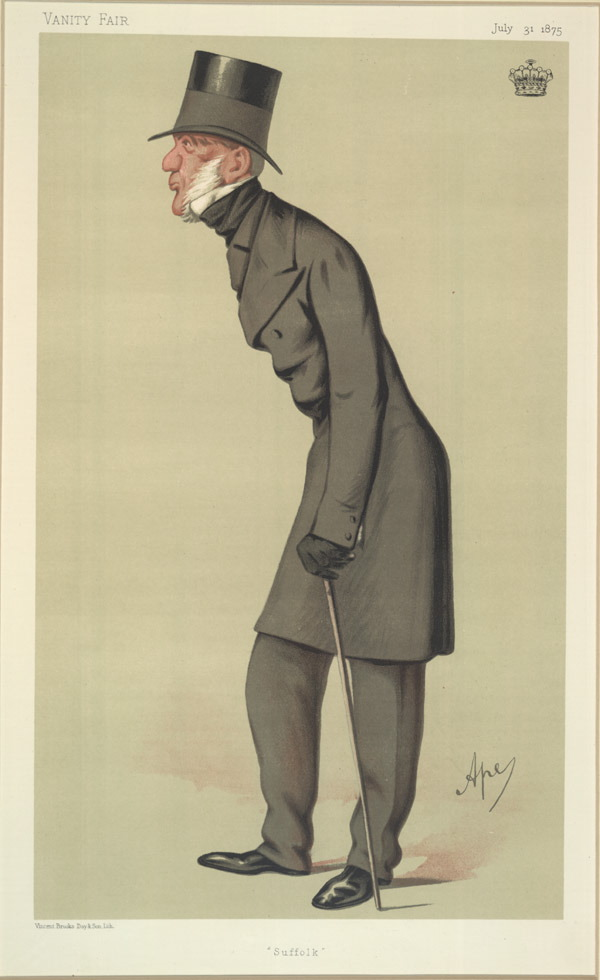
- "Suffolk", a caricature by "Ape" published in Vanity Fair in 1875.
- Born: 13 March 1794; Darsham, Suffolk
- Died: 27 January 1886 (aged 91); Henham Park, Suffolk
- Relatives: Admiral Henry John Rous (brother)
- Military career
- Allegiance: United Kingdom
- Branch: British Army
- Service years: 1810–1821
- Rank: Captain
- Units: Coldstream Guards; 93rd Regiment of Foot
- Conflicts: Peninsular War; Waterloo Campaign

John Edward Cornwallis Rous, 2nd Earl of Stradbroke (13 February 1794 – 27 January 1886) was a British soldier and nobleman.

== Biography ==
He was the eldest son of the 6th Baronet and 1st Earl of Stradbroke. He joined the Army at the age of 16, being gazetted as an ensign in the Coldstream Regiment of Foot Guards on 30 June 1810.

During the Peninsular War, he took part in the battles of Salamanca, Burgos, Vittoria and San Sebastian. He was present at the crossing of the Bidassoa, at the Nivelle and Nive, the crossing of the Ardour and the invasion of Bayonne. On 4 May 1814 he was promoted to lieutenant.

Rous returned to the family estate, Henham Park, for 12 months leave, but was ordered to rejoin his regiment in Brussels following Napoleon's escape from Elba in March 1815. While serving in Wellington's campaign in Belgium, Rous was wounded at Quatre Bras and so did not take part in Napoleon's defeat two days later at Waterloo.

On 6 November 1817 he transferred to the 93rd Regiment of Foot with the rank of captain. Rous retired from the Army in 1821.

His military service earned him the Military General Service Medal with five clasps.

After the death of his father in August 1827 he became the 2nd Earl of Stradbroke. He pursued an active life as a peer and politician, also serving as the Colonel of the disembodied East Suffolk Militia from 24 May 1830 to 1844, and as Lord Lieutenant and the Vice-Admiral of Suffolk, 1844–1886.

== Family ==
On 26 May 1857 he married Augusta Bonham (1830–1901), the widow of Colonel Henry Frederick Bonham, and the daughter of the Reverend Sir Christopher John Musgrave, 9th Bt., by whom he had six children:

- Lady Augusta Fanny Rous (1858–1950), who married Lt. Cecil Francis William Fane, son of Judge Robert Fane and grandson of Vice-Adm. Sir Henry Blackwood, 1st Baronet. They had two sons.
- Lady Sophia Evelyn Rous (1859–5 Nov 1940), married Major George Hamilton Heaviside. There is no known issue.
- George Edward John Mowbray Rous, 3rd Earl of Stradbroke (1862–1947)
- Lady Adela Charlotte Rous (1865–1911), who married R.N. Lt. Thomas Belhaven Henry Cochrane. They had one son.
- Lady Hilda Maud Rous (1867–1904), married Charles Fitzroy Ponsonby McNeill, great-grandson of Maj.-Gen. Sir William Ponsonby and great grandson of the Ver. Rev. Charles Talbot. They had a son, and daughter.
- Lady Gwendoline Audrey Adeline Brudenell Rous (1869–1952), who married in 1895 Brigadier-General Sir Richard Beale Colvin, KCB (1856–1936), had an issue.

Augusta, Countess of Stradbroke died suddenly, during a visit to her daughter Lady Hilda McNeill, 10 October 1901.

== Publications ==
- Rous, John (1992). Fletcher, Ian (ed.). A Guards Officer in the Peninsula: the Peninsular War Letters of John Rous, Coldstream Guards, 1812–1814. Tunbridge Wells, UK: Spellmount. ISBN 1-873376-09-X.

Honorary titles
Preceded by The Duke of Grafton	Lord Lieutenant of Suffolk; 1844–1886	Succeeded by The Marquess of Bristol
Vacant Title last held by The Marquess of Hertford	Vice-Admiral of Suffolk; 1844–1886	Vacant Title next held by The Earl of Stradbroke
Peerage of the United Kingdom
Preceded by John Rous	Earl of Stradbroke; 1827–1886	Succeeded by George Rous
