= William Rous (disambiguation) =

William Rous was a privateer.

William Rous may also refer to:

- William Rous (British Army officer)
- William Rous (died 1539), MP for Dunwich (UK Parliament constituency)
- William Rous (died c.1635) (c 1594 - c 1635), MP for Truro
- William Rous (14th-century MP), MP for Bath in 1390
- William Rous, 5th Earl of Stradbroke
