= George Rous, 3rd Earl of Stradbroke =

British nobleman

The Right Honourable The Earl of Stradbroke KCMG CB CVO CBE VD TD
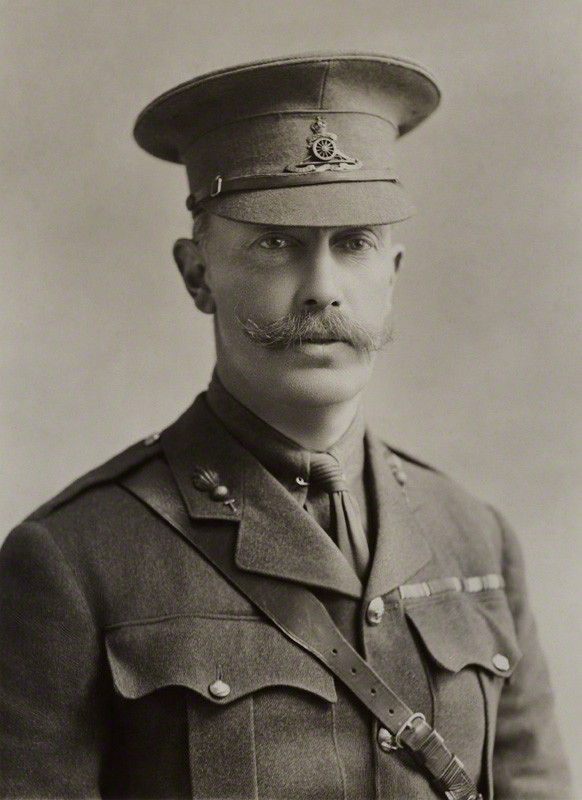

15th Governor of Victoria
- In office 24 February 1921 – 7 April 1926
- Monarch: George V
- Premier: Harry Lawson (1921–24); Sir Alexander Peacock (1924); George Prendergast (1924); John Allan (1924–26)
- Preceded by: Sir Arthur Stanley
- Succeeded by: Lord Somers

Parliamentary Secretary to the Ministry of Agriculture and Fisheries
- In office 5 February 1928 – 4 June 1929
- Monarch: George V
- Prime Minister: Stanley Baldwin
- Preceded by: The Lord Bledisloe
- Succeeded by: Christopher Addison

Personal details
- Born: 19 November 1862 London, England
- Died: 20 December 1947 (aged 85) Henham Park, England
- Party: Conservative
- Spouse: Helena Fraser (m. 1898)
- Children: 8, including John and William
- Parent(s): John Rous, 2nd Earl of Stradbroke; Augusta Musgrave

Military service
- Allegiance: United Kingdom
- Branch/service: Territorial Army
- Years of service: 1882–1930
- Rank: Colonel
- Battles/wars: First World War
- Awards: Knight Commander of the Order of St Michael and St George; Companion of the Order of the Bath; Commander of the Royal Victorian Order; Commander of the Order of the British Empire; Volunteer Officers' Decoration; Territorial Decoration

George Edward John Mowbray Rous, 3rd Earl of Stradbroke, KCMG, CB, CVO, CBE, VD, TD (19 November 1862 – 20 December 1947) was a British nobleman from Suffolk who served as a Territorial Army officer, as a junior government minister, and as the 15th Governor of Victoria, Australia.

== Early life ==
He was born on 19 November 1862, the only son and heir of John Rous, 2nd Earl of Stradbroke. Under the courtesy title of Viscount Dunwich, he was educated at Harrow School and at Trinity College, Cambridge (Bachelor of Arts 1884, Master of Arts 1890). He succeeded his father as the 3rd Earl of Stradbroke and owner of the family seat at Henham Park in Suffolk on 27 January 1886.

== Career ==
Viscount Dunwich was commissioned captain in the 1st Norfolk Artillery Volunteers (which included Suffolk batteries) in 1882. He was promoted major in 1884, and lieutenant colonel to command the unit in 1888. He was promoted to colonel in the Volunteers on 26 June 1902, and was awarded the Volunteer Decoration on 15 August 1902. He was appointed an aide-de-camp to King Edward VII in the 1902 Coronation Honours list on 26 June 1902, serving until the King's death in 1910 when he was re-appointed by King George V.

When the Volunteer Force was replaced by the Territorial Force on 1 April 1908, his unit was split up: Stradbroke became Honorary Colonel of the 1st East Anglian Brigade, Royal Field Artillery (TF) (which contained the Norfolk batteries), while remaining lieutenant colonel commanding the 3rd East Anglian (Howitzer) Brigade (which contained the Suffolk batteries). He led the 3rd East Anglian Brigade and its successor units on active service on the Western Front in Egypt and Palestine during the First World War. He was awarded the Territorial Decoration, appointed a Commander of the Order of the British Empire in 1919 and a Knight Commander of the Order of St Michael and St George in 1920.

After the war he remained Honorary Colonel of the Norfolk artillery brigade (now known as the 84th (East Anglian) Brigade) and from 18 May 1927 filled the same role with the Suffolk brigade (now the 103rd Suffolk Brigade) until it was split up, when he continued as Honorary Colonel of the 409th (Suffolk) Independent Anti-Aircraft Battery until its renewed merger with the Norfolk batteries to form the 78th (1st Anglian) Anti-Aircraft Regiment in 1938.

He also served as chairman of the Suffolk Territorial Army Association and as president of the Council of the National Artillery Association. He finally retired from an active role with the Territorial Army and as ADC to the King in 1930.

=== Politics ===
Stradbroke was appointed as Governor of Victoria in 1920 and held the position until 1926. He also served as Parliamentary Secretary to the Ministry of Agriculture and Fisheries from 1928 until the defeat of the 1924–1929 Conservative Government.

=== Scouting ===
As ex. officio the Chief Scout of Victoria as governor, Lord Stradbroke also sponsored the Victorian Scouting competition, the Stradbroke Cup. This event is still held every year and is immensely popular.

=== Freemasonry ===
A Freemason, Stradbroke was initiated to the craft in the Lodge of Prudence No. 388. After he became Worshipful Master of the Lodge, he was appointed Provincial Grand Master of Suffolk in October 1902, holding the position for forty-five years. Two years after being appointed Governor of Victoria, he was elected Grand Master of the Grand Lodge of Victoria. He was also Provincial Grand Master of Mark Masons of East Anglia.

=== Public life ===
In addition to his political and military positions, Stradbroke held the office of Vice-Admiral of Suffolk, was Lord Lieutenant of Suffolk and a Justice of the Peace, and an Alderman and chairman of East Suffolk County Council. He was also president of the National Sea Fisheries Protection Association.

Both the Earl and Countess were supporters of thoroughbred racing. While in Victoria they separately owned or leased several horses, notably Trice, trained for the Countess by Jack Holt.

== Personal life ==
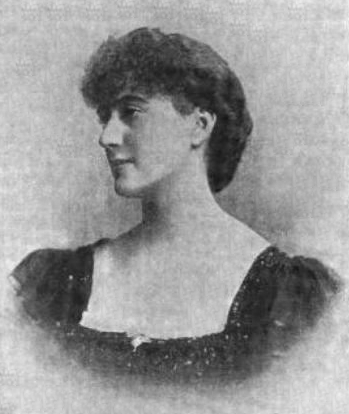
Helena Violet Alice Fraser in 1902

On 23 July 1898 Stradbroke married Helena Violet Alice Fraser (d. 1949), the daughter of Lieutenant General James Keith Fraser (a younger son of Lt.-Col. Sir James John Fraser, 3rd Baronet). As Countess of Stradbroke she was created a Dame Commander of the Order of the British Empire in the 1927 Birthday Honours. They had the following children:

- Lady Pleasance Elizabeth Rous (1899–1986), who married Owen McKenna, son of Patrick McKenna, in 1923.
- Lady Catherine Charlotte Rous (1900–1983), a Squadron Officer in the Women's Auxiliary Air Force.
- Lady Betty Helena Joanna Rous (1901–1969), who married Maj. Douglas Beresford-Ash, son of Col. William Randal Hamilton Beresford-Ash and Lady Florence Browne (a daughter of the 5th Marquess of Sligo), in 1930.
- John Anthony Alexander Rous, 4th Earl of Stradbroke (1903–1983), who married Barbara Grosvenor, daughter of Lt.-Col. Lord Arthur Grosvenor (a younger son of the 1st Duke of Westminster), in 1929.
- William Keith Rous, 5th Earl of Stradbroke (1907–1983), who married Pamela Kay-Shuttleworth, a daughter of Hon. Edward Kay-Shuttleworth, in 1935. They divorced in 1940 and he married Mary April Asquith, daughter of Brig.-Gen. Hon. Arthur Melland Asquith and Hon. Betty Manners (a daughter of the 3rd Baron Manners), in 1943.
- Major Hon. George Nathaniel Rous (1911–1982), who married Joyce Harpur, daughter of Col. Charles Harpur, in 1949.
- Major Hon. Peter James Mowbray Rous (1914–1997), who married Elizabeth Alice Mary Fraser, a daughter of Maj. Hon. Alastair Thomas Joseph Fraser (a son of the 13th Lord Lovat) and Lady Sibyl Grimston (a daughter of 3rd Earl of Verulam), in 1942.
- Hon. Christopher Simon Rous (1916–1925), who died young.

Lord Stradbroke died on 20 December 1947 and was succeeded by his eldest son, John. His widow, the Dowager Countess of Stradbroke, died in an accident on 14 April 1949.

=== Honours ===
In addition to the honours noted above, the Earl of Stradbroke was made a Companion of the Order of the Bath in 1904 and a Commander of the Royal Victorian Order in 1906. He was a Knight of the Order of St John and held the Grand Cross of the Order of the Savior of Greece.

Political offices
Preceded by Lord Bledisloe	Parliamentary Secretary to the Ministry of Agriculture and Fisheries; 1928–1929	Succeeded by Christopher Addison
Government offices
Preceded by Sir Arthur Stanley	Governor of Victoria; 1921–1926	Succeeded by Lord Somers
Honorary titles
Preceded by Sir Courtenay Warner, 1st Baronet	Lord Lieutenant of Suffolk; 1935–1947	Succeeded by Earl of Stradbroke
Vacant Title last held by Earl of Stradbroke	Vice-Admiral of Suffolk; 1890–1947	Vacant
Masonic offices
Preceded by Fredrick Hickford	Grand Master of the United Grand Lodge of Victoria; 1922–1926	Succeeded by William Bice
Peerage of the United Kingdom
Preceded by John Rous	Earl of Stradbroke; 1886–1947	Succeeded by John Rous
