= List of horse mills =

This is a list of horse mills that exist or are known to have existed.

== Belgium ==
Province	Location	Notes
Antwerp	Antwerp	Brouwers Huis Museum
Antwerp	Ghent	Bas relief of a mediaeval horse mill on front of mill.

== Channel Islands ==
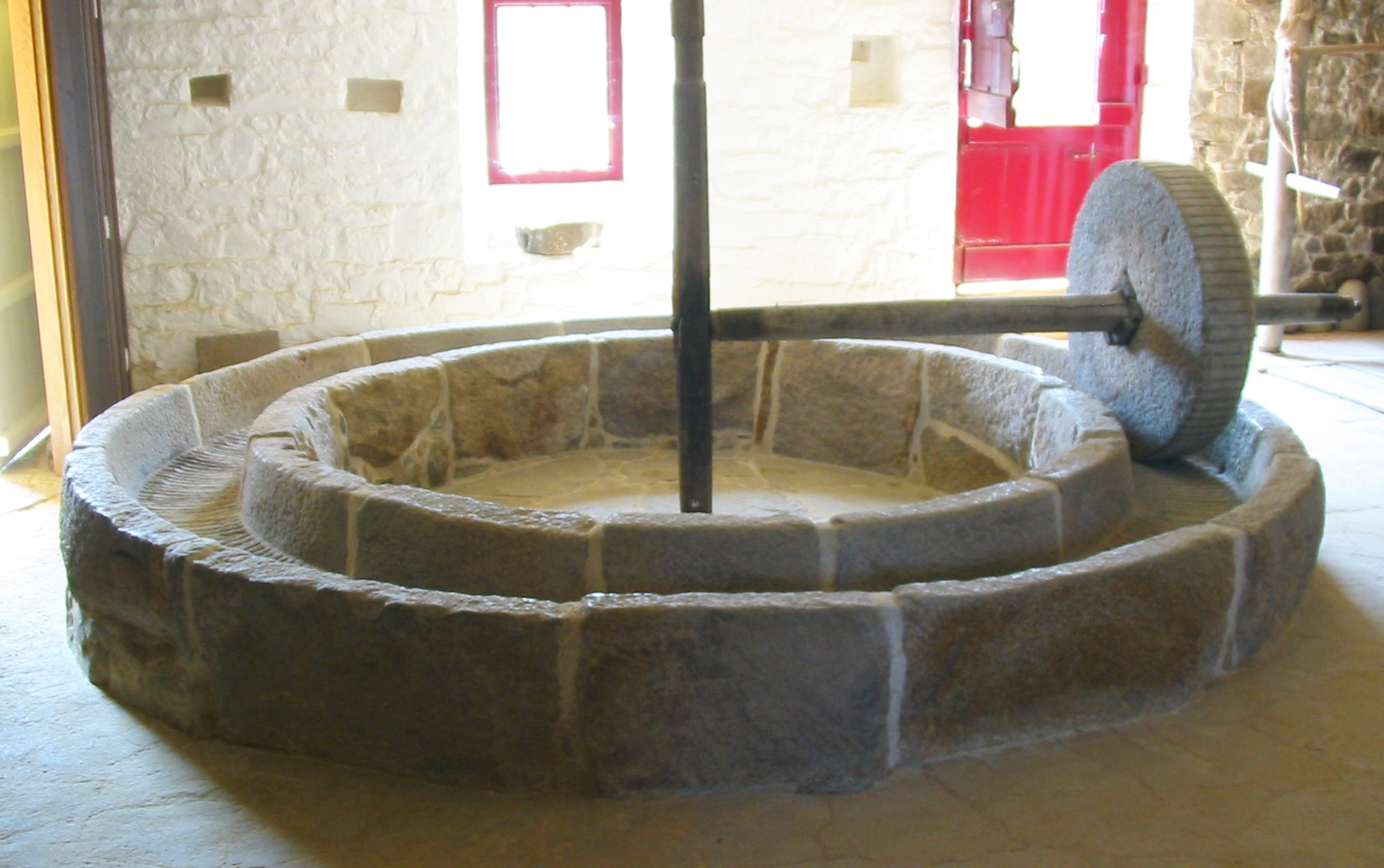
Circular horse-drawn apple crusher (tou d'preinseu) at The Elms, Jersey: a property of the National Trust for Jersey

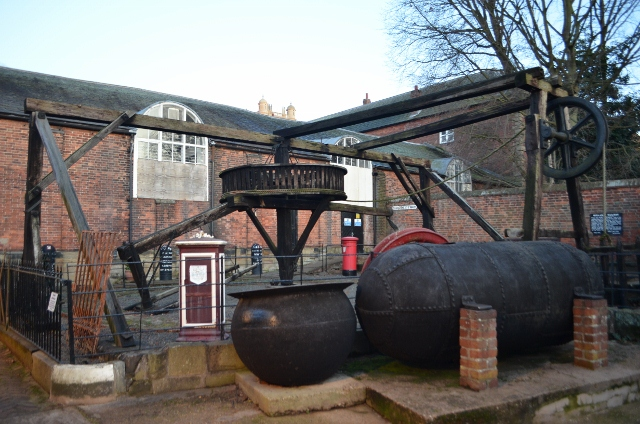
1840s Whim Gin, original from Langton Colliery. Now at Wollaton hall, Nottingham

Island	Location	Notes
Jersey	The Elms	A horse-drawn apple crusher.
Guernsey		A horse-powered cider mill is preserved at the Folk museum.

== Croatia ==
County	Location	Notes
Vukovar-Srijem County	Otok	The local horse-powered "dry" mill (Croatian: Otočka suvara) is the symbol of- and is found in the coat of arms of the city. It is the last remaining mill of this type in Croatia.

== England ==
County	Location	Notes
Bedfordshire	Eversholt	A horse engine, now preserved at Billing Mill, Northamptonshire.
	Kensworth	A donkey wheel from Nash Farm is preserved in Luton Museum and Art Gallery.
	Kensworth	There was a donkey wheel at Church End Farm.
	Sandy Heath	A horse powered wash mill was in use at the coprolite mine in the 1870s.
	Woburn	A horse-driven corn mill.
Berkshire	Woolley Park	A horse-driven corn mill.
Buckinghamshire	Aylesbury	A horse wheel and churn are now preserved in the Science Museum (London).
	Hawridge	A horse mill photographed in 1938 by Stanley Freese.
Cambridgeshire	Fen Ditton	in 1251 the customary tenants of the bishop of Ely were required to use the horse mill even though other mills were available.
	Horningsea	A horse-powered mill in 1251.
	Little Eversden	A horse mill £50 (on the coprolite workings).1871.
	Meldreth	A horse-powered mill was used to process material from coprolite mine between 1860 and 1890.
	Newton-in-the-Isle	A horse powered temporary woad mill that was subsequently moved to Parson Drove.
	Parson Drove	A horse driven temporary woad mill operated in Parson Drove, near Wisbech until the early 20th century. Previously used in Newton-in-the-Isle. Taken down in 1914. model is on exhibition in Wisbech & Fenland museum.
	Stretham	A horse powered washing mill for the coprolite mine c1870.
	Tydd St.Giles	A former location of the horse operated temporary woad mill that ended its days at Parson Drove.
	Wisbech	In 1251 a water mill, a horse mill, at which customary tenants were obliged to grind their corn, and a newly constructed wind mill.
	Wisbech	In 1813 an excellent second-hand Horse Mill was for sale. Described as consisting of one horse wheel, 18 feet diameter : 2 sour ditto with upright shaft and iron work complete : one pair of stones, 4 feet diameter, and irons complete; stone bed frame, brig tree, stone cases, with hopper, screen, & c. Pump gears, shaft, cranks, and iron work to the same, all in excellent condition. Enquire of Mr. geo. Snarey, millwright, Wisbech.
Cheshire	Widnes	A horse-powered mill in Widnes in the 13th century.
Cornwall	Gwennap	A horse whim for raising ore.
	Newquay	A horse gear for driving a threshing machine is preserved at the Dairyland museum.
Cumberland	Cartmel	A horse gear is preserved at the Museum of Lakeland Life, Kendal.
Derbyshire	Castleton	A horse-powered ore crusher stood at SK135835.
Devonshire	Bovey Tracey	A photo of the horse cider Press in Bovey Tracey. C1940. E.M.Gardiner.
	Dunsford	Remains of a horse powered cider Press. Lowley Farm.
	Harberton	A photo of the cider Press in Harberton. c1940.Mills archive.
	Scorlinch, Clyst St. Lawrence	A horse engine.
	Weyland, Tedburn St. Mary	A horse-powered mill, extant in the 1920s.
Durham	East Herrington	A horse-powered mine gin.
	Beamish Museum	Oak and iron horse mill for threshing in situ in gin gang at Home Farm; unused since ca.1830.
Hampshire	Southampton	A horse-powered pumping engine in the Weevil Brewery. Built by John Smeaton in 1780.
Herefordshire	Bacton	A contemporary horse powered cider Press at Fair Oak.
	Little Cowarne	A horse-powered cider mill located in the oast at Little Cowarne Court.
Hertfordshire	Ashridge	A donkey wheel.
Isle of Wight	Carisbrooke	Carisbrooke Castle: a donkey wheel, extant.
Kent	Chilham	Chilham Castle: a horse wheel driving pumps.
	Burham	Great Kewlands, a dog wheel for raising water.
	West Kingsdown	A horse whim, now preserved at the Weald and Downland Open Air Museum, Singleton, Sussex.
Lancashire	Preston	A horse powered spinning mill.
Lincolnshire	Brothertoft	A horse powered permanent woad mill. In operation until the early 20th century.
	Grimsby	A horse operated machine for grinding Malt was offered for sale by Messrs. Simpson & Reavis in 1809.
	Spalding	A horse powered temporary woad mill. Later relocated and finally taken down at Parson Drove, Cambridgeshire.
	Sutterton	A horse powered Woad mill.
	Whaplode Marsh	A horse powered temporary woad mill. Later relocated and finally taken down at Parson Drove, Cambridgeshire.
London		A horse-powered pumping engine in the Chiswell Street brewery.
Norfolk	Norwich	Catton mill: a horse and wind mill.
		Earlham Hall: a horse mill.
		Heigham: in a tannery
		Mill Hill, Heigham: a horse and wind mill.
		Pockthorpe mill: a horse and wind mill.
	Attleborough	Great mill: a horse and wind mill.
	King's Lynn	Kettle mills: a horse-, wind- and water-mill.
	Oulton	A horse and wind mill.
	Wymondham	A horse-powered mill.
Northumberland	Berwick Hill	A horse gin built in 1814. Now preserved at Beamish Museum. Cragend Farm Rothbury 1864 OS map A horse gin built earlier shown on OS map in 1864 latterly reconstructed by Loord Armstong of Cragside into a hydraulic machine room using water power.
Nottinghamshire	Nottingham	A horse powered cotton mill.
	Wollaton Park	A horse gin built at Langton Colliery in 1844 and later used at Pinxton Colliery.
Oxfordshire	Rotherfield Greys.	Greys Court: a National Trust property, with a donkey wheel.
	Great Tew	A horse-powered corn mill.
Suffolk	Blythburgh	There was a horse wheel at Henham Hall now preserved at the Museum of East Anglian Life in Stowmarket.
	Drinkstone.	The smock mill formerly had a horse mill in the base.
Surrey	Cobham	A contemporary horse powered cider mill 'Horse Kick Cider Ltd' since 2016
	Painshill	A horse wheel used for raising water. In use from 1770 to the 1830s.
Sussex	Patching	A pug mill, now preserved at the Weald and Downland Open Air Museum, Singleton
	Mark Cross	a pug mill in a brickyard.
	Stanmer	A donkey wheel, in the churchyard of Stanmer Church.
	Saddlescombe	A donkey wheel at the farm, owned by the National Trust.
Wiltshire	Broad Hinton	A donkey wheel, demolished in 1908.
	Tidworth	A horse-driven pump, working in the 1930s.
Worcestershire	Burlingham	A horse-powered cider mill is preserved at Hartlebury Castle.
Yorkshire	Hutton-le-Hole	A horse mill is preserved at the Ryedale Folk Museum.
	Stillington	A horse wheel now preserved at Shibden Hall.
	Sutton	A gorse crushing mill is preserved on the village green.

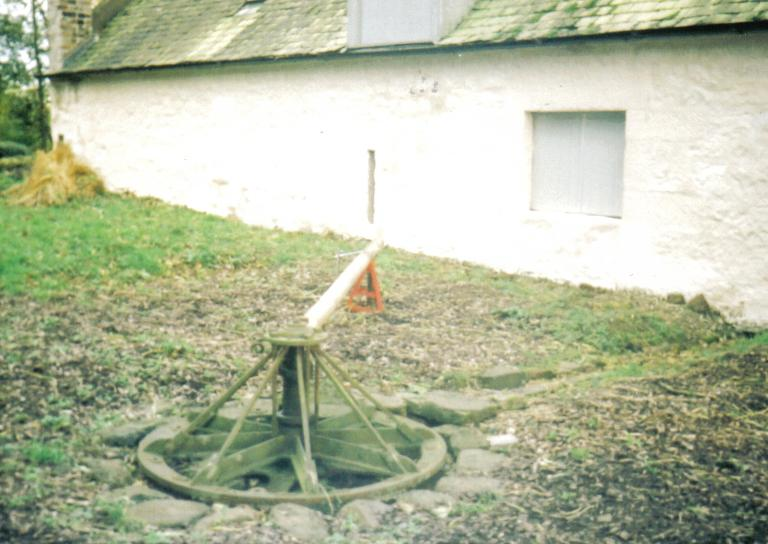
The horse mill at Wester Kittochside farm near Glasgow

== France ==
Département	Location	Notes
Drôme	Nyons	Les Vieux Moulins à huile, a watermill and also animal-powered mill.
Lot	Varaire	Moulin à huile, an animal-powered oil mill.
Tarn	Magrin	Musée du Pastel
Var	Pontevès	Moulin de Pontevès, produced olive oil.
Vaucluse	Gordes	Moulin des Bouillons, produced olive oil.
Vaucluse	Joucas	Le Moulin à huile, produced olive oil.

== Hungary ==
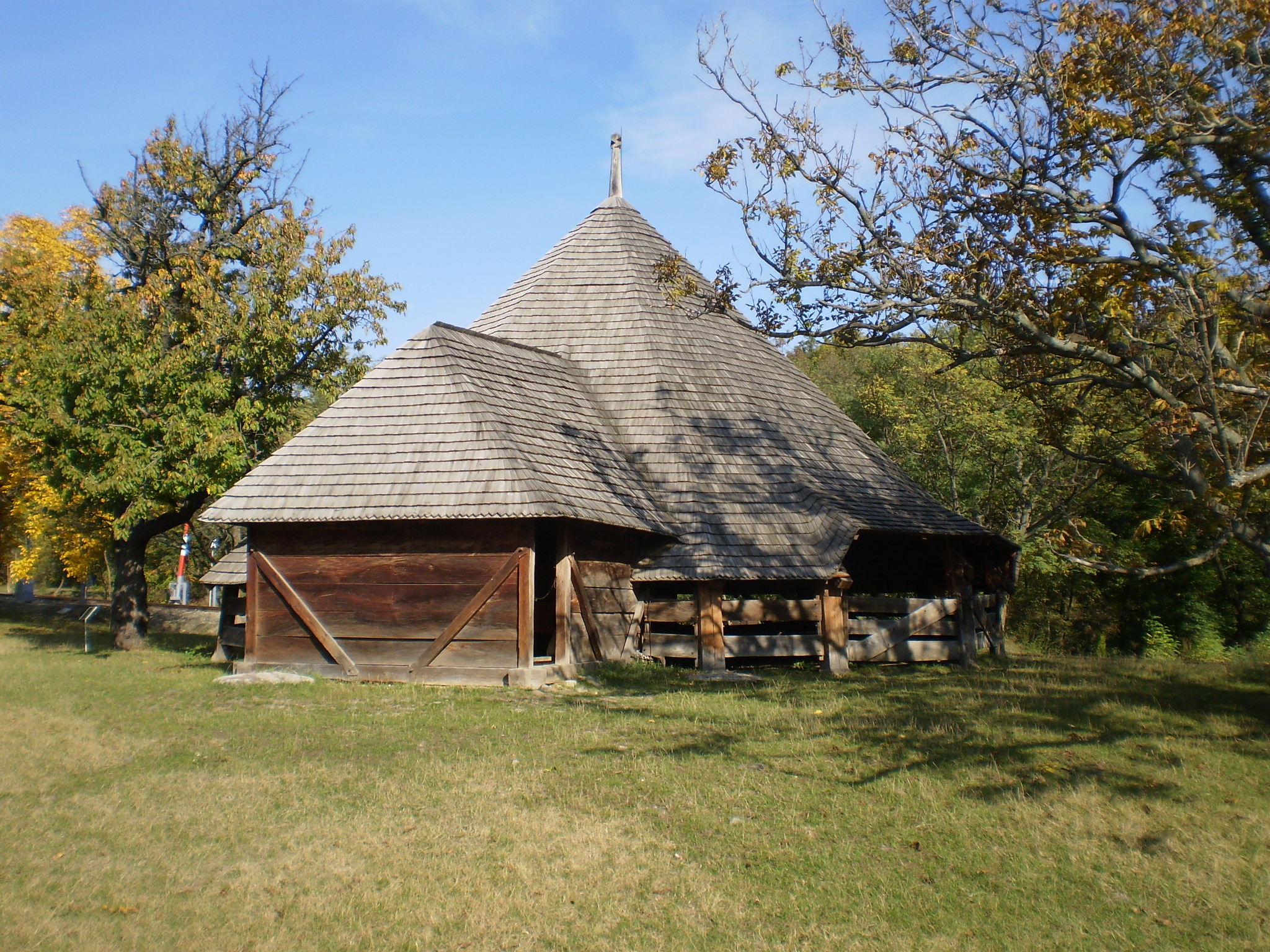
The Vámosoroszi animal-powered "drymill" (reconstructed)

County	Location	Notes
Békés	Szarvas	A mill built in 1836. (Hungarian: szarvasi szárazmalom) is the last remaining horse-powered mill in its condition.
Szabolcs-Szatmár-Bereg	Vámosoroszi	A reconstructed horse-powered mill built before 1840. is moved to the Hungarian Open Air Museum in Szentendre.
Szabolcs-Szatmár-Bereg	Tarpa	An animal-powered mill reconstructed in 1980s is declared industrial-history landmark and functions as an open-air cultural heritage museum.

== Poland ==
Voivodeship	Location	Notes
Lesser Poland	Wieliczka Salt Mine	Three horse mills: Hungarian- and Saxon-types with vertical rope drums and Polish-type with a horizontal windlass

== Scotland ==
County	Location	Notes
Aberdeenshire	Gartly	A horse mill for crushing gorse for fodder
Ayrshire	Titwood Farm, Kilmaurs	
Fife	Culross	Horse-gin built by Sir George Bruce c1590 to raise mine water from his Moat Pit, powered by 3 horses and using 36 buckets on a chain, working to a depth of 40 fathoms, known as the 'Egyptian Wheel'. At least 3 other horse-gins were in use at Culross Colliery between 1590 and 1676.
Lanarkshire	Wester Kittochside, East Kilbride.	This example is at the Museum of Scottish Country Life and was recently dug out (2005) and partially restored to working condition.
Orkney	Garson Farm, Stromness	
Selkirkshire	Broomhill House, Selkirk	Recently restored horse mill
Shetland	Lund Farm, Unst	A horse gin, probably for powering a thresher in the barn.

== Serbia ==
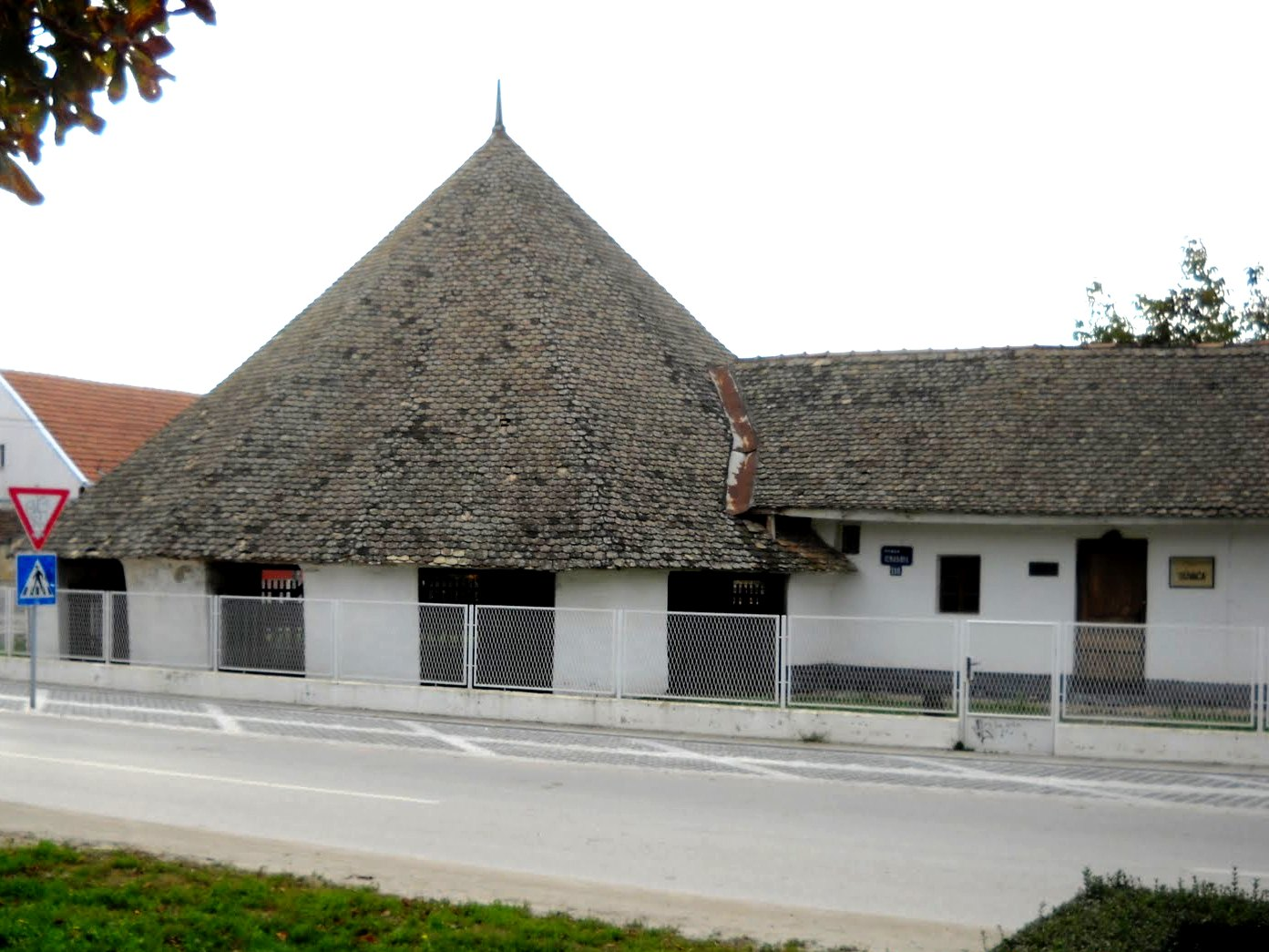
Suvača

District	Location	Notes
North Banat District	Suvača, Kikinda	Suvača is in 1990 proclaimed as a Monument of Culture of Exceptional Importance.

== Spain ==
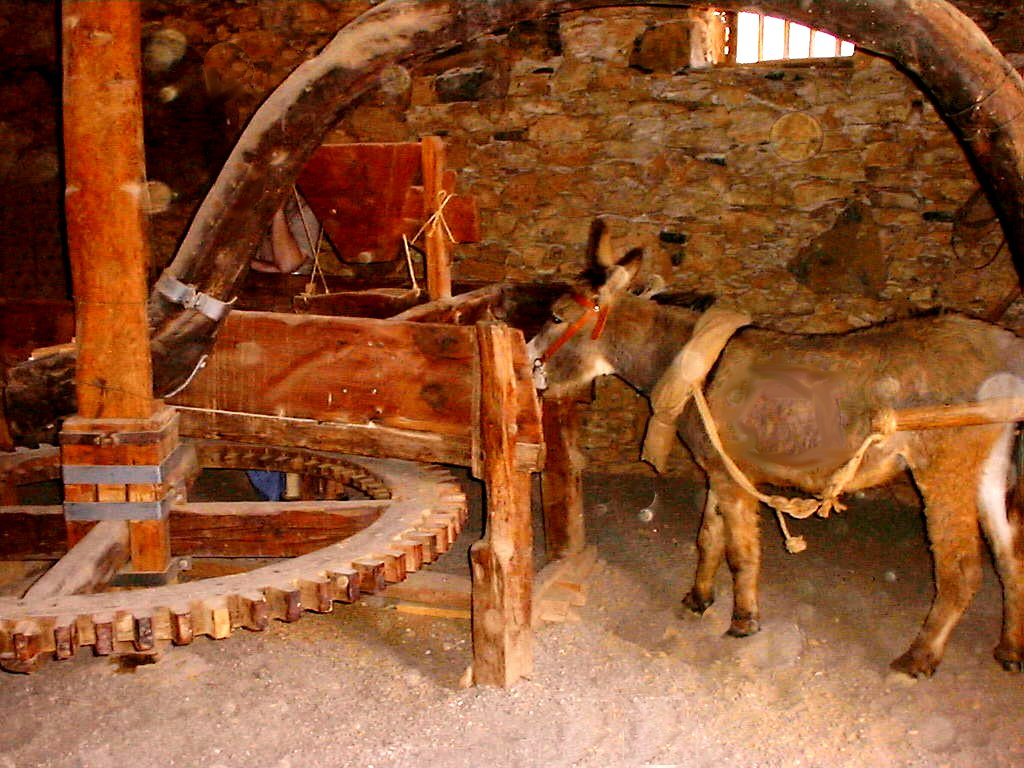
Tefia

Province	Location	Notes
Canary Islands	Tefia, Puerto del Rosario	A donkey-powered mill preserved at La Alcogida Ecomuseum

== Wales ==
County	Location	Notes
Caernarvonshire	Dullog, Rhostryfan, Caernarfon	An oblique dog-wheel. Now preserved at the Welsh Folk Museum, St. Fagans, Cardiff
Denbighshire	Wrexham	Bersham Colliery, a reconstruction of a horse gin.
Monmouthshire	Abergavenny	A dog-driven spit is preserved in the museum.
Pembrokeshire	Penysgwarne Farm, Tremarchog	

== United States ==
State	Location	Notes
Indiana	Bottorff-McCulloch Farm	

== See also ==
- The International Molinological Society
- Museum of Scottish Country Life
