= Sir Joshua Rowley, 7th Baronet =

Joshua Francis Rowley, M.A., JP, DCL (31 December 1920 – 21 February 1997), was a soldier and landowner, and Lord Lieutenant of Suffolk from 1978 to 1994.

== Personal life ==
He was the son of Colonel Sir Charles Rowley, 6th Baronet. He was educated at Eton College and Trinity College, Cambridge. He served in the Grenadier Guards from 1940 to 1946.

In 1959 he married The Hon. Celia Ella Vere Monckton, second daughter of the 8th Viscount Galway; they had one daughter, Susan Emily (who married the art expert Robert Holden).

On 19 January 1962 he inherited the baronetcy from his father.

He died in 1997 and is buried in the churchyard of St Mary in Stoke-by-Nayland, Suffolk.

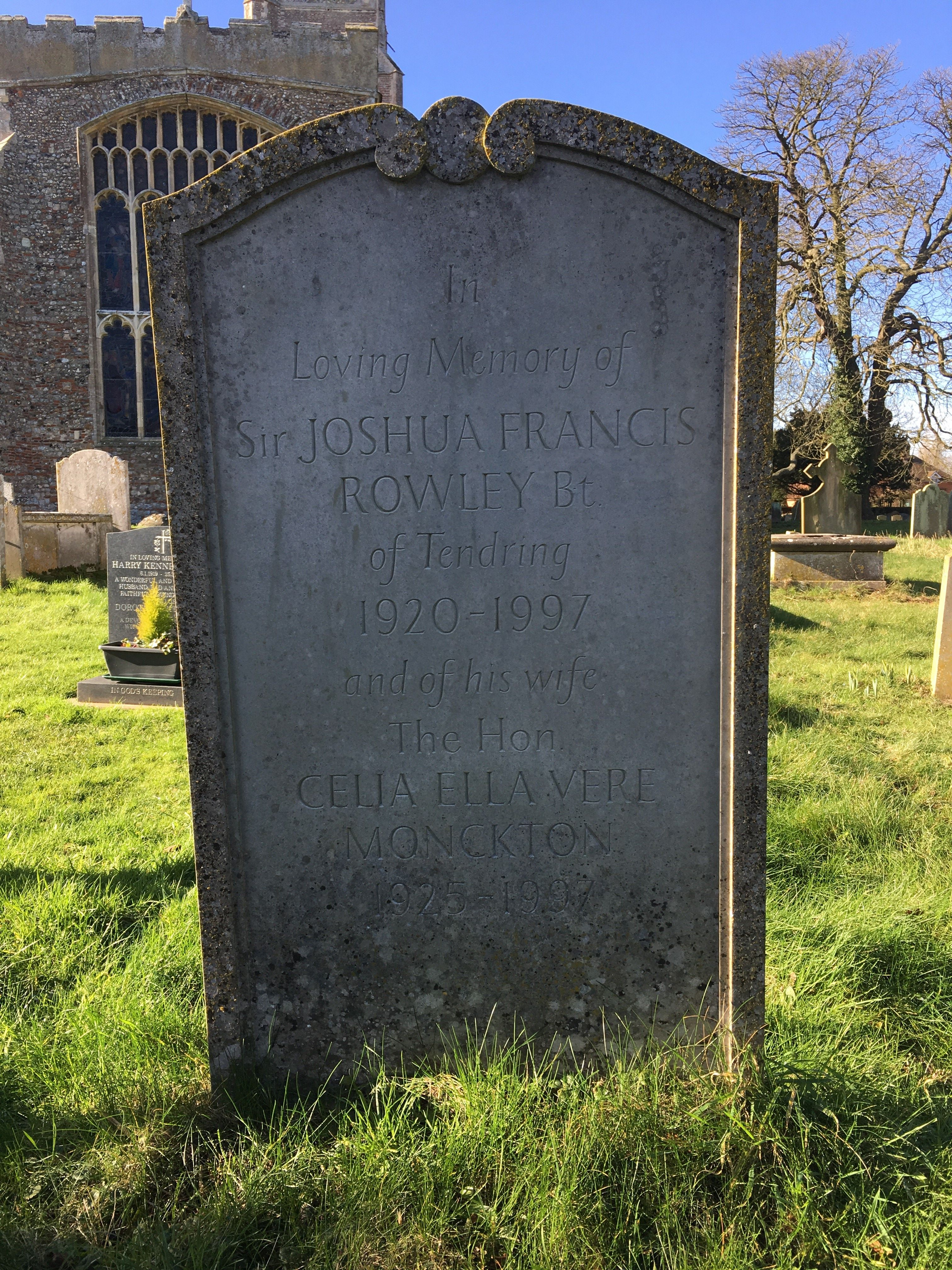
The grave of Sir Joshua Rowley in Stoke-by-Nayland churchyard

== Public service ==
Rowley was Deputy Secretary of the National Trust from 1950 to 1955. He served as Chairman of West Suffolk County Council from 1971 to 1974; and of Suffolk County Council from 1976 to 1978.

He was successively Deputy Lieutenant, High Sheriff, and Vice Lord-Lieutenant of Suffolk before his appointment as Lord-Lieutenant. He was appointed a JP in 1978 and Honorary DCL by UEA in 1991.

Honorary titles
Preceded by The Earl of Stradbroke	Lord Lieutenant of Suffolk; 1978–1994	Succeeded by The Lord Belstead
Baronetage of Great Britain
Preceded by Charles Rowley	Baronet (of Tendring Hall); 1962–1997	Succeeded by Charles Rowley
