= HMS Rainbow (1823) =

HMS Rainbow was a frigate of the Royal Navy, built in 1823. It was a sixth rate sloop with 26 guns.

It was commanded by Henry John Rous from 1825 to 1829. From 1825 to 1827 it served under the Commander-in-Chief, East Indies. In February 1827 it arrived in Sydney in the colony of New South Wales where it was used to conduct a number of explorations of the (now) Queensland and New South Wales coasts.

The Rainbow Reach of the Macleay River in New South Wales was named after the ship and the locality Rainbow Reach in the Kempsey Shire was named after the reach.
