= Joshua Grigby =

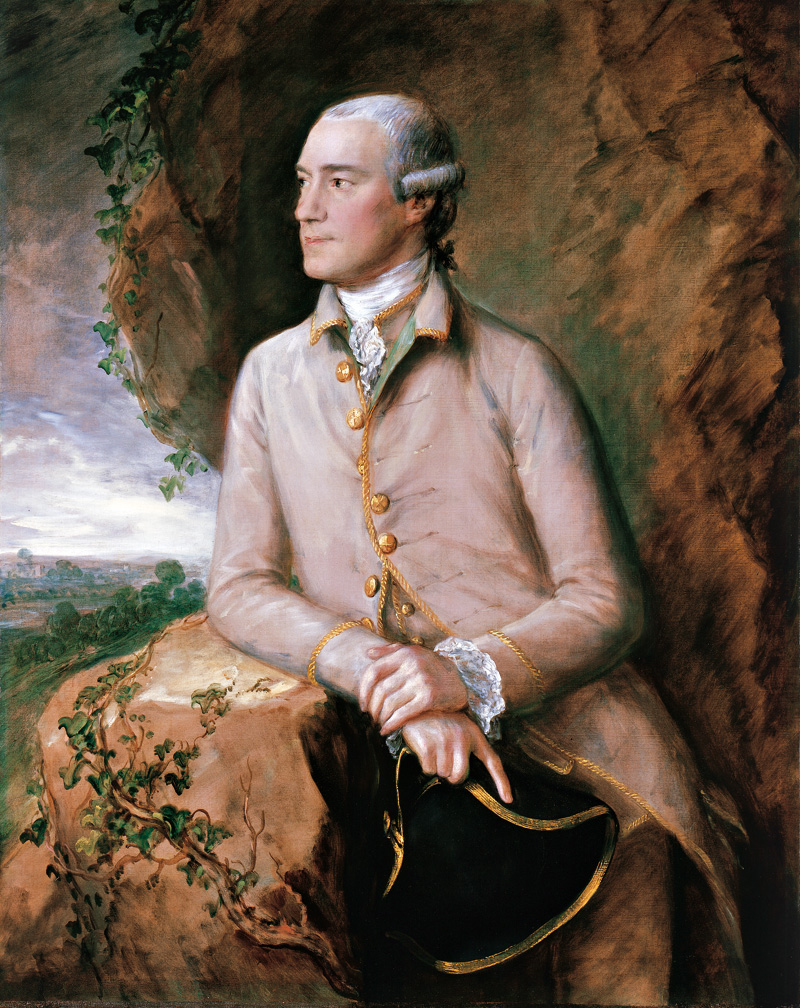
Portrait by Thomas Gainsborough

Joshua Grigby (c. 1731 – 26 December 1798) was a Member of Parliament for Suffolk from 1784 to 1790.

He was the son of Joshua Grigby, a solicitor, and Mary Tubby, and was educated at Clare College, Cambridge. His grandfather, also Joshua Grigby, was lord of the manor of Gonvile Manor, Wymondham, Norfolk.

His father was town clerk of Bury St Edmunds, and after gaining a law degree at Cambridge University, Joshua followed him in this role.

Grigby married, in 1756, Jane Bird, daughter of Thomas Bird and Elizabeth Martyn of Coventry. He died on 26 December 1798, aged sixty-seven, and was buried at Drinkstone.
