= John Rous, 1st Earl of Stradbroke =

British nobleman, race horse owner and Member of Parliament

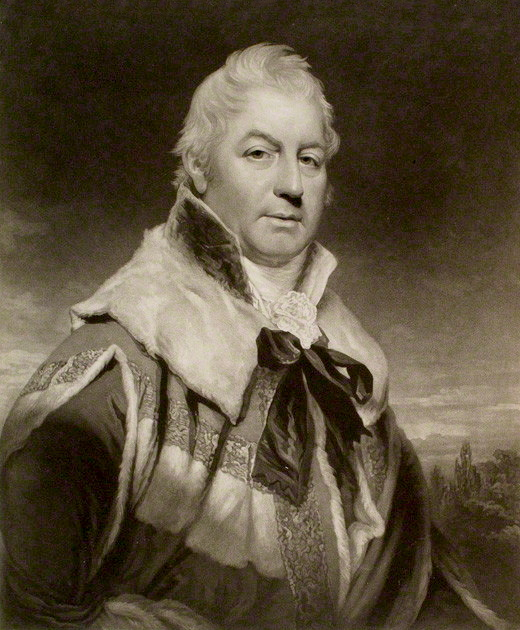
The Earl of Stradbroke, 1811.

John Rous, 1st Earl of Stradbroke (30 May 1750 – 27 August 1827), known as Sir John Rous, Bt, from 1771 to 1796 and as The Lord Rous from 1796 to 1821, was a British nobleman, race horse owner and Member of Parliament. He married Charlotte Maria Whittaker on 23 February 1792 at 11 Manchester Square, London, England.

Stradbroke was the son of Sir John Rous, 5th Baronet, and succeeded as sixth Baronet on his father's death in 1771. In 1780 he was elected to the House of Commons for Suffolk, a seat he held until 1796. The latter year he was raised to the peerage as Baron Rous, of Dennington in the County of Suffolk. In 1821 he was further honoured when he was made Viscount Dunwich, in the County of Suffolk, and Earl of Stradbroke, in the County of Suffolk. Lord Stradbroke owned a stud farm in Suffolk and won the 1815 2,000 Guineas with the colt Tigris.

In 1788 he married Juliana Warter Wilson, daughter of Irish landowner Edward Wilson of Bilboa. His wife owned an estate on the border between Limerick and Tipperary. She died in 1790. he couple had a daughter Lady Frances Anne Juliana Rous who married Vice Admiral Henry Hotham. Stradbroke later remarried.

Lord Stradbroke died in August 1827, aged 77 and was succeeded in his titles by his eldest son John. His second son, Henry John Rous, became an admiral in the Royal Navy and a renowned steward of the Jockey Club.

Parliament of Great Britain
Preceded by Sir Charles Bunbury, Bt; Rowland Holt	Member of Parliament for Suffolk; 1780–1796; With: Sir Charles Bunbury, Bt 1780–1784; Joshua Grigby 1784–1790; Sir Charles Bunbury, Bt 1790–1796	Succeeded by Sir Charles Bunbury, Bt; Viscount Brome
Peerage of the United Kingdom
New creation	Earl of Stradbroke; 1821–1827	Succeeded by John Rous
Peerage of Great Britain
New creation	Baron Rous; 1796–1827	Succeeded by John Rous
Baronetage of England
Preceded by John Rous	Baronet (of Henham); 1771–1827	Succeeded by John Rous
