= Henham Park =

Park in Wangford with Henham, East Suffolk, Suffolk, England

Coordinates: 52.3388°N 1.5977°E

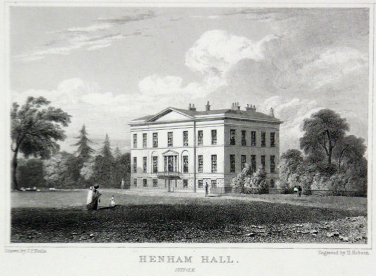
Henham Hall in 1829, built in 1790 by John Rous, 1st Earl of Stradbroke to the design of James Wyatt; demolished 1953

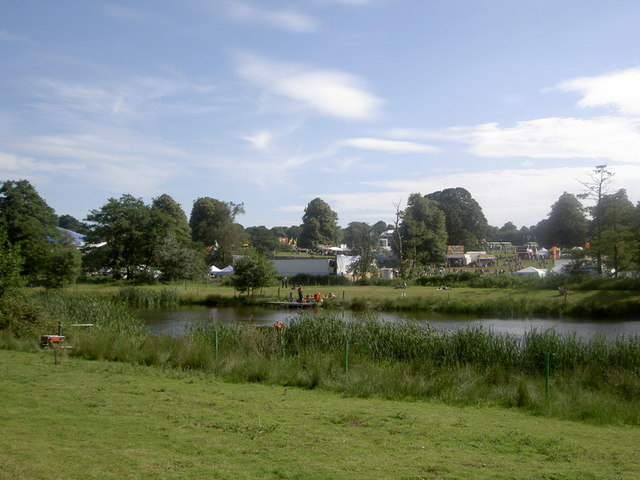
Latitude Festival at Henham Park in 2007, when over 20,000 people attended

Henham Park is an historic 4,200 acres (1,700 ha) estate in the parish of Wangford with Henham, situated north of the village of Blythburgh in the English county of Suffolk. The park is bordered to the east by the A12 road and to the west by the A145, the two roads meeting to the south of the estate.. It was historically the seat of the Earl of Stradbroke. In 1953 the 4th Earl demolished the Georgian manor house, known as Henham Hall.

The estate's current owner is Keith Rous, 6th Earl of Stradbroke (b. 1937), formerly of Mount Fyan's Station, Dundonnell, Victoria, Australia, a 5,900 hectare (14,580 acre) ranch which he purchased in 1989 and sold in 2016 for $ Aus 34 million (£19 million). In 2006 a major £60 million redevelopment plan was announced by Hektor Rous, the estate manager and a younger son of the 6th Earl, including the building of a large hotel. The park is the venue for the Latitude Festival of arts and music and plays host to other events throughout the year.

== History ==
=== Hunting park ===
The original Henham lands were hunting grounds in the historic civil parish of Henham, the seat of the de la Poles Earls of Suffolk, of Wingfield Castle in Suffolk, on which a timber-framed structure was built with its own protective moat.

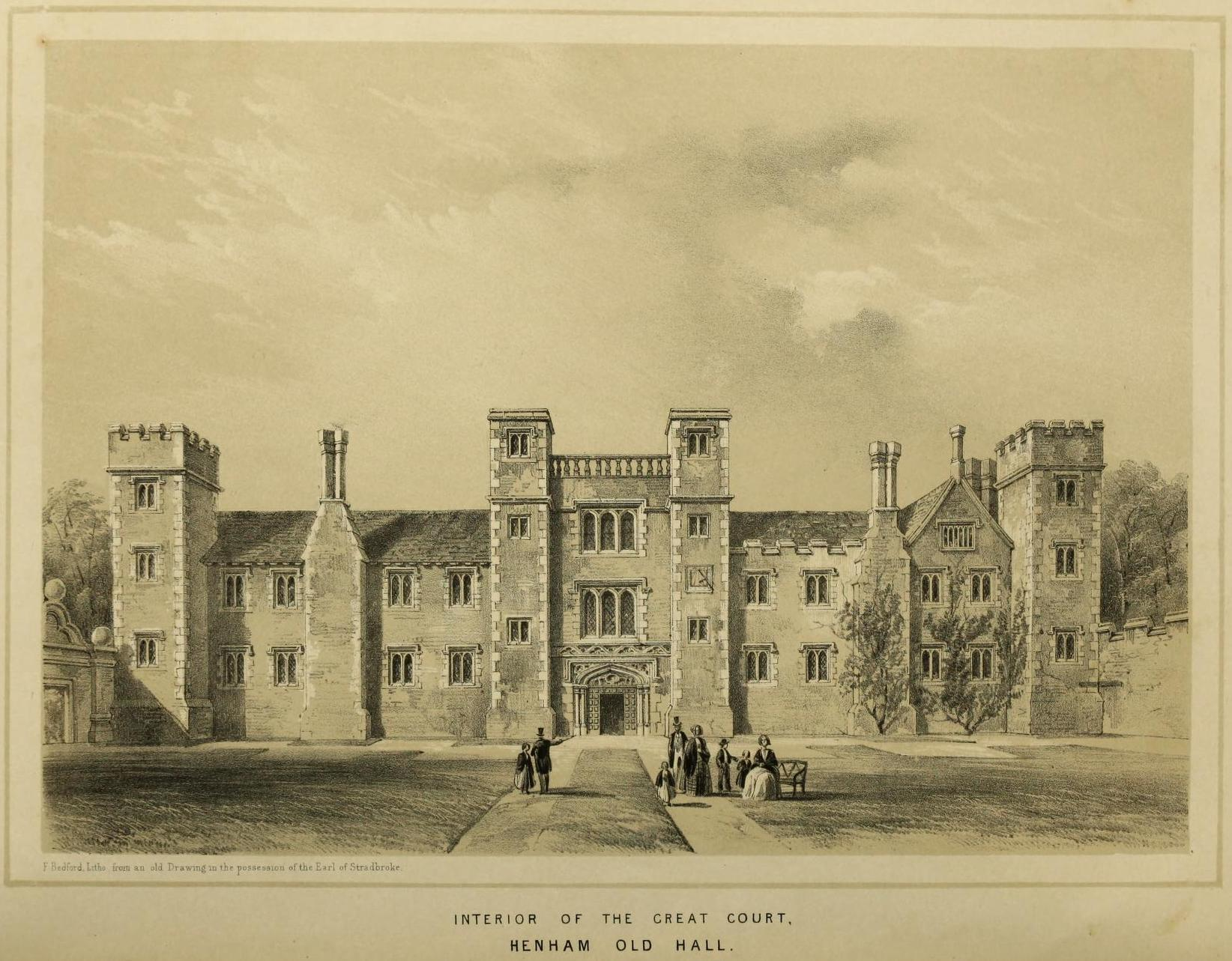
The Tudor frontage of Henham Old Hall from within the courtyard, based on an old drawing

However in 1513 King Henry VIII ordered the execution of Edmund de la Pole, and granted the property to his friend Charles Brandon, 1st Duke of Suffolk, who built a new mansion house 200 yards (180 m) in front of the old mediaeval timber-framed structure, in fine Tudor style. The house had extensive walled gardens on two sides and enclosed a large courtyard. In 1538 there is a record of a deer park here.

On Brandon's death in 1545, the Crown granted Henham to Sir Arthur Hopton of Blythburgh who immediately sold the estate to Sir Anthony Rous, Knight, of Dennington, near Stradbroke in Suffolk. In 1575 Christopher Saxton represented Henham with a small icon of a park on his map of Suffolk.

In 1773, while Sir John Rous, 6th Baronet (from 1821 1st Earl of Stradbroke) was away on a Grand Tour of Venice, his drunken butler had a mishap with a candle, which caused a fire that destroyed the building. The £30,000 loss represented eight years' income from the estate, and the substantial blow meant that it was to be twenty years before he could afford to rebuild.

This structure was the subject of an episode of the Channel 4 television series Time Team in January 2013.

=== Georgian hall ===
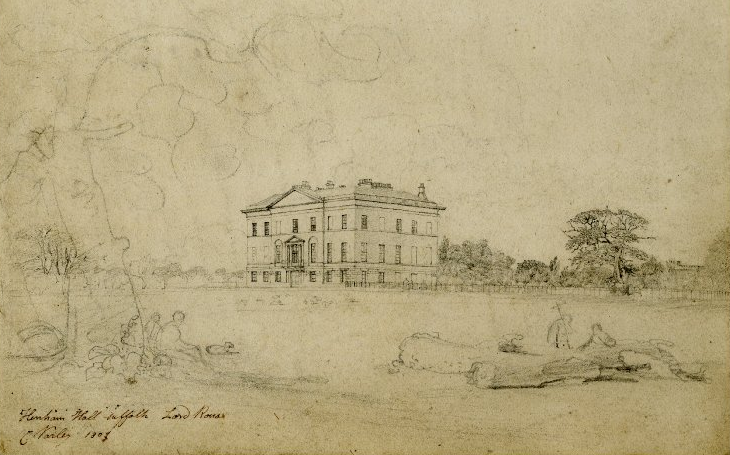
Henham Hall in 1801, drawn by Cornelius Varley, then drawing instructor to Lord Rous

In 1790 Sir John, later the first Earl of Stradbroke, commissioned James Wyatt to build a new hall, 100 yards (91 m) in front of the second hall, with accompanying parkland design by Humphrey Repton. An impressive structure, in 1858 Augusta Bonham wife of the second Earl instructed architect Edward Barry to give it a Victorian gloss; the work was carried out by Lucas Brothers.

This hall was demolished by the fourth Earl of Stradbroke in 1953, despite attempts by his brother, later the fifth Earl, to keep the house intact. One wall remains, with a frieze depicting a Native American fighting a bear.

A horse mill used to operate on the estate, one of only two known in Suffolk. This is now preserved at the Museum of East Anglian Life at Stowmarket.

== Present ==
The fourth Earl died in 1983 with his brother becoming the fifth Earl for only four days before also dying. Robert Keith Rous – at that time a businessman and sheep grazier in Australia – then inherited Henham and became the sixth Earl of Stradbroke. This was, however, not without difficulty and a protracted court battle led to a family feud.

== Events and other uses ==
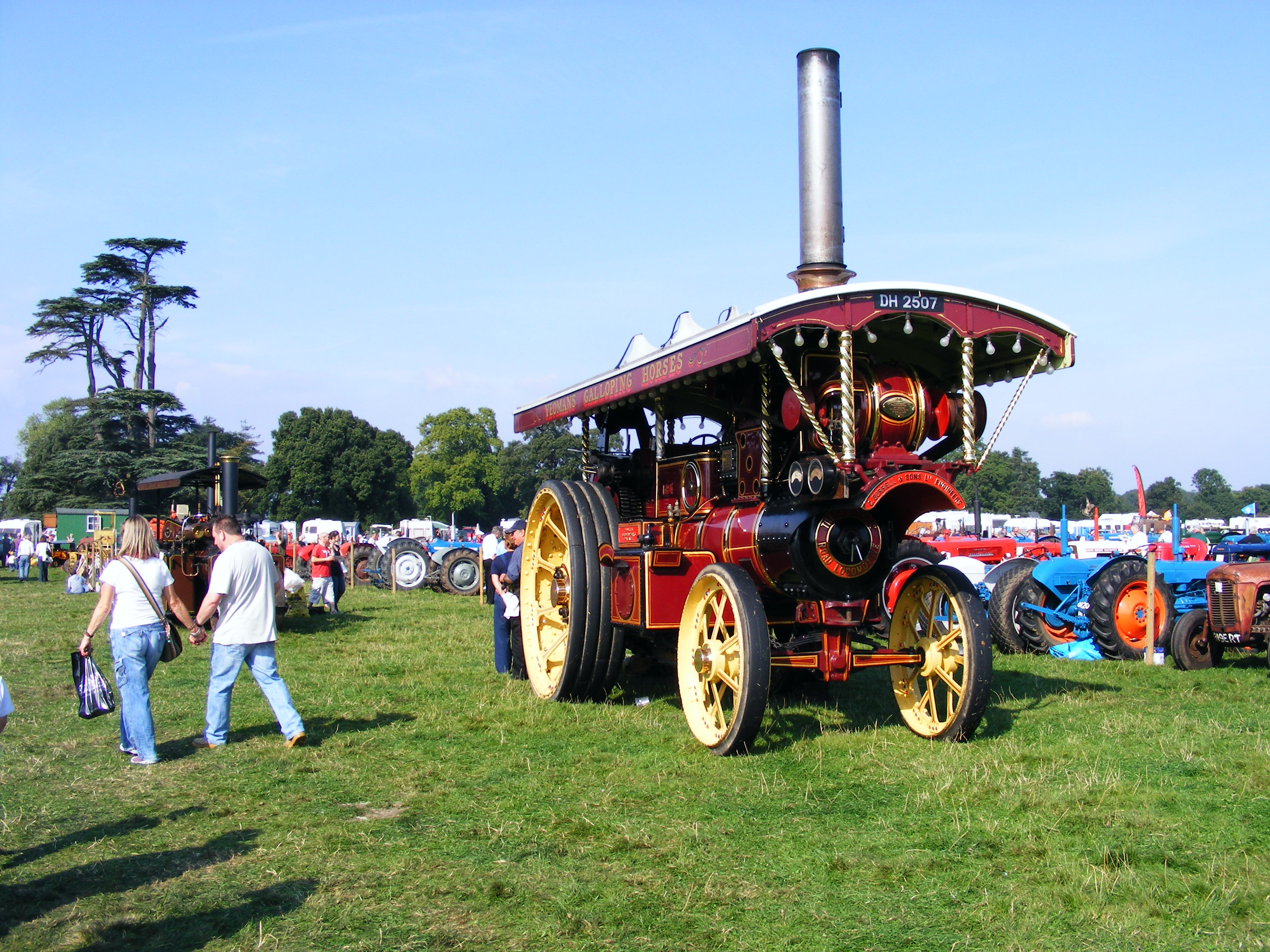
Steam Engines at the 2008 Henham Steam Rally

The estate hosts the Wings and Wheels and Grand Henham Steam Rally as well as remaining a working farm. Every July it hosts Latitude Festival, an annual arts festival of music, theatre and comedy which 40,000 people attend. A brewery was planned. Owner Hektor Rous hired spare capacity at other breweries (particularly Oakham and Green Jack) to brew his beers. Most production was for the annual Latitude festival in the park, though a small number of pubs and events were also supplied. Suffolk CAMRA report that production ceased about 2015, though confirmation has yet to be found.

Bed and breakfast accommodation is located on the site as well as a series of walking trails.
