= Henry John Rous =

Royal Navy officer and politician (1795–1877)

Admiral The Honourable Henry John Rous
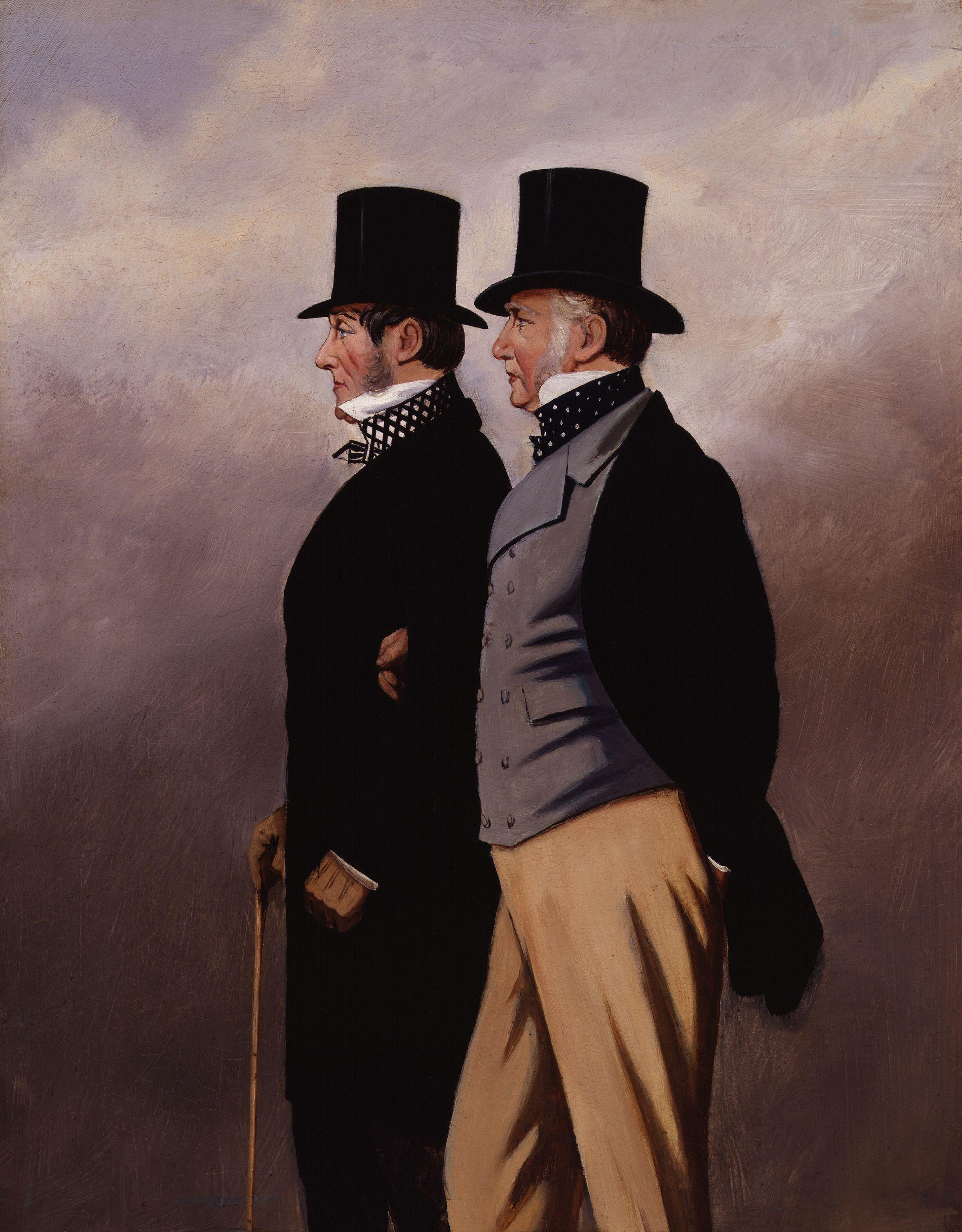
- Portrait of Rous (right)
- Born: 23 January 1795; London, England
- Died: 19 June 1877 (aged 82); London, England
- Military career
- Allegiance: United Kingdom
- Branch: Royal Navy
- Service years: 1808–1835
- Rank: Admiral
- Commands: HMS Podargus; HMS Mosquito; HMS Sappho; HMS Hind; HMS Rainbow; HMS Pique
- Conflicts: Napoleonic Wars; Walcheren Campaign; Adriatic campaign of 1807–14; Siege of Cattaro; Siege of Ragusa (1814)

Admiral Henry John Rous (23 January 1795 – 19 June 1877) was a Royal Navy officer and politician who served in the Napoleonic Wars.

== Biography ==
=== Family background and education ===
Rous was the second son of John Rous, 1st Earl of Stradbroke, and was educated at Westminster School, and Dr. Burney's Academy. His elder brother was John Rous, 2nd Earl of Stradbroke, and his half-sister married Vice-Admiral Sir Henry Hotham.

=== Naval career ===
Aged just 13, Rous entered the Navy on 28 January 1808 as first-class volunteer on board the Royal William, under the command of Captain the Honourable Courtenay Boyle, and the flagship of Sir George Montagu, the Commander-in-Chief, Portsmouth. In February 1809, he moved into the 74-gun Repulse, Captain the Hon. Arthur Kaye Legge. After taking part in the Walcheren Campaign, in November 1809 he became a midshipman aboard Victory, flagship of Sir James Saumarez in the Baltic. In March 1811, he joined Tonnant, Captain John Gore, employed off Lisbon and in the Channel and, from December 1811, he served in the frigate Bacchante, Captain William Hoste, taking part in the Adriatic campaign.

There Rous took part in numerous actions. On the night of 31 August 1812 he was involved in the cutting out from the port of Lema, near Venice, of seven vessels loaded with ship timbers for the government of the Kingdom of Italy, together with the French xebec Tisiphone and two gunboats and, on 6 January 1813, the boats of Bacchante and the sloop Weazel successfully captured five enemy gun-vessels in the neighbourhood of Otranto. On 15 May 1813, he assisted at the capture and destruction of the castle and batteries of Karlobag and, on 12 June, he commanded the Bacchante's yawl in the capture at Giulianova of seven large gun-boats, three smaller gun-vessels, and 14 merchantmen. The British boats approached and boarded under a heavy fire of grapeshot and musketry, while the Marines landed on shore, driving off 100 enemy troops and capturing two field guns. Rous was put in command of one of the merchantmen, laden with oil, which broached and capsized in heavy weather around midnight, only kept afloat by the buoyancy of her cargo. Rous and his prize crew were eventually rescued by another prize around 4 a.m. In 1814, Rous participated in the capture of Rovigno, the island of Lesina, and the fortresses of Cattaro and Ragusa.

On 18 May 1814, he was promoted to lieutenant and, from August 1814 until December 1815, served aboard the frigate Maeander, Captain John Bastard, off Lisbon and in the Mediterranean. From January 1817, he served aboard Conqueror, the flagship of Rear-Admiral Robert Plampin at Saint Helena and, on 2 August, was appointed acting-commander of the 14-gun sloop Podargus. His promotion being confirmed on 26 November 1817, he was then appointed to Mosquito, finally returning to England in mid-1819. He then commanded the brig-sloop Sappho at Cork from November 1821, and the sixth-rate Hind in the Mediterranean from February 1822.

Rous was promoted to post-captain on 25 April 1823 and, from July 1825, commanded Rainbow in the East Indies. He visited Australia and, in April 1827, organised Sydney's first regatta. In August 1828, he explored the Tweed, and explored and named the Richmond River, both in north-eastern New South Wales. The area between those rivers is known as Rous County, although counties are not widely recognised in Australia and are mainly used for cadastral purposes. While in Moreton Bay, he named the Rous Channel, Dunwich, and Stradbroke Island, after his family titles, and influenced the naming of Ipswich, Queensland.

Rous returned to England in August 1829 and, from November 1834, commanded the frigate Pique. His ship ran ashore on the coast of Labrador in the Strait of Belle Isle in September 1835 and was greatly damaged. Rous, however, brought her across the Atlantic Ocean with a sprung foremast and without keel, forefoot or rudder, with the ship making 23 in (0.58 m) of water an hour.

=== Thoroughbred horse racing ===
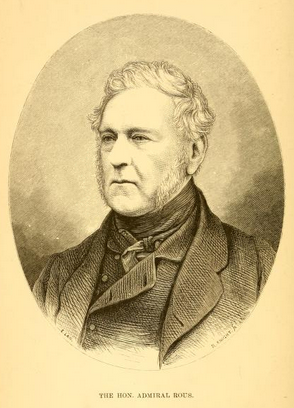
Illustration of Admiral Rous taken from James Rice's History of the English Turf (1879)

His father owned a stud farm in Suffolk and won the 1815 2,000 Guineas with the colt Tigris. Rous, always fond of the sport, became a steward of the Jockey Club in 1838, a position he held, almost uninterrupted, until his death. In 1855, he was appointed public handicapper. In that role he introduced the weight-for-age scale. For many years, he managed the stables of the Duke of Bedford at Newmarket, and wrote On the Laws and Practice of Horse Racing that procured for him the title of the Blackstone of the Turf.

The Rous Memorial Stakes was named in his honour.

=== Political career ===
In the general election of July 1841, he was elected as Conservative Member of Parliament (MP) for Westminster and, in February 1846, The Sir Robert Peel appointed him Fourth Naval Lord, in which post he served only until July. The appointment triggered a by-election, which Rous lost to the Liberal candidate, George de Lacy Evans, whom he had defeated in 1841.

Though no longer an active serving officer, Rous's seniority saw him promoted to rear admiral on 17 December 1852, to vice admiral on 5 January 1858, and to admiral on the Retired List on 6 June 1863.

Admiral Rous died at 13 Berkeley Square in London on 19 June 1877. He is buried at Kensal Green Cemetery, London.

== See also ==
- Henham Park

Parliament of the United Kingdom
| Preceded by Sir George de Lacy Evans; John Temple Leader | Member of Parliament for Westminster; 1841–1846; With: John Temple Leader | Succeeded by John Temple Leader; Sir George de Lacy Evans |
Military offices
| Preceded by Sir William Gordon | Fourth Naval Lord; 1846 | Succeeded by Lord John Hay |
