= Lord Lieutenant of Suffolk =

This is a list of people who have served as Lord-Lieutenant of Suffolk. Since 1642, all Lord Lieutenants have also been Custos Rotulorum of Suffolk.

== Lord Lieutenants of Suffolk ==
- Sir Anthony Wingfield 1551–1552 jointly with
- ? 1551–?
- Thomas Radclyffe, 3rd Earl of Sussex 1557–1583
- Thomas Wentworth, 2nd Baron Wentworth 1561
- Henry Carey, 1st Baron Hunsdon 3 July 1585 – 23 July 1596
- vacant
- Thomas Howard, 1st Earl of Suffolk 3 July 1605– 28 May 1626
- Theophilus Howard, 2nd Earl of Suffolk 15 June 1626 – 3 June 1640
- James Howard, 3rd Earl of Suffolk 16 June 1640 – 1642 jointly with
- Sir Thomas Jermyn 16 June 1640 – 1642
- Interregnum
- James Howard, 3rd Earl of Suffolk 25 July 1660 – 12 March 1681
- Henry Bennet, 1st Earl of Arlington 12 March 1681 – 6 May 1685
- Henry FitzRoy, 1st Duke of Grafton 6 May 1685 – 28 March 1689
- Charles Cornwallis, 3rd Baron Cornwallis 28 March 1689 – 29 April 1698
- Charles Cornwallis, 4th Baron Cornwallis 14 June 1698 – 16 June 1703
- Lionel Tollemache, 3rd Earl of Dysart 16 June 1703 – 25 April 1705
- Charles FitzRoy, 2nd Duke of Grafton 25 April 1705 – 6 May 1757
- Augustus FitzRoy, 3rd Duke of Grafton 4 December 1757 – 10 February 1763
- Charles Maynard, 1st Viscount Maynard 10 February 1763 – 1 June 1769
- Augustus FitzRoy, 3rd Duke of Grafton 1 June 1769 – 3 July 1790
- George FitzRoy, 4th Duke of Grafton 3 July 1790 – 19 January 1844
- John Rous, 2nd Earl of Stradbroke 19 January 1844 – 27 January 1886
- Frederick Hervey, 3rd Marquess of Bristol 17 February 1886 – 7 August 1907
- Sir William Brampton Gurdon 21 October 1907 – 1910
- Sir Courtenay Warner, 1st Baronet 8 July 1910 – 15 December 1934
- George Rous, 3rd Earl of Stradbroke 4 February 1935 – 20 December 1947
- John Rous, 4th Earl of Stradbroke 2 April 1948 – 24 April 1978
- Sir Joshua Rowley, 7th Baronet 24 April 1978 – 11 February 1994
- John Ganzoni, 2nd Baron Belstead 11 February 1994 – 30 June 2003
- John Tollemache, 5th Baron Tollemache 30 June 2003 – 13 December 2014
- Clare FitzRoy, Dowager Countess of Euston 13 December 2014 – 15 April 2026
- Mark John Pendlington 16 April 2026 – Present
