= John Rouse (librarian) =

British librarian

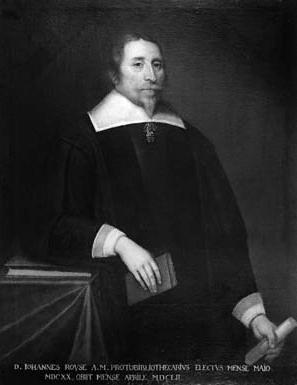
A portrait of John Rouse

John Rouse (Rous, Russe) (1574 – 3 April 1652) was an English librarian. He was the second librarian of the Bodleian in Oxford, as well as a friend of John Milton.

== Life ==
John was born in Somerset, matriculated at Oxford in 1591, and graduated B.A. from Balliol College on 31 January 1599. He was elected Fellow of Oriel College in 1600, and received his M.A. 27 March 1604.

On 9 May 1620, he was chosen chief librarian of the Bodleian Library, a post he discharged with great vigour and acumen until his death. At that time, he occupied 'Cambye's lodgings', also written 'Camby's', once a part of St. Frideswide's Priory as a medieval tenement. He afterwards sold the property to Pembroke College, as a residence for the master.

Rouse annotated a collection of Robert Burton's books, which were given to the Bodleian Library by testamentary disposition on Burton's death; two of his inscriptions are cited by Alan H.Nelson as supplying independent confirmation that, for this learned bibliographer, William Shakespeare was identified by a contemporary as the author of Burton's copies of two of Shakespeare's narrative poems. The inscriptions read.

- Venus and Adonis by Wm Shakespear Lond. 1602
- The rape of Lucrece by Wm Shakespear Imp{er}fet.

Around 1635, Rouse formed a friendship with Milton; Barbara Lewalski considers they met in Horton, where Milton was studying. He asked the poet for a complete copy of his works for the library, and Milton in 1647 sent two volumes to Oxford, the prose pamphlets carefully inscribed in his own hand 'to the most excellent judge of books,' and a smaller volume of poems which was stolen or lost on the way. To this circumstance, we owe Milton's mock-heroic ode To John Rouse (dated 23 January 1646-7) inserted in a second copy, preserved at the Bodleian.

In 1645, he refused to lend King Charles the 'Histoire Universelle du Sieur d'Aubigné' because the statutes forbade the removal of such a book. Christopher Arnold, professor of history at Nuremberg, and Lambecius both complimented him. He died on 3 April 1652, and was buried in Oriel College Chapel. Rouse wrote a dedicatory preface to a collection of verses addressed to the Danish proconsul, Johan Cirenberg (Oxford, 1631). He also issued an appendix to the Bodleian Catalogue in 1635, and his portrait hangs in the Middle Common Room of Oriel College.
