= John Rous, 4th Earl of Stradbroke =

The Right Honourable The Earl of Stradbroke KStJ

Lord Lieutenant of Suffolk
- In office 1948–1978
- Preceded by: The Earl of Stradbroke
- Succeeded by: Sir Joshua Rowley, Bt

Personal details
- Born: John Anthony Alexander Rous; 1 April 1903
- Died: 14 July 1983 (aged 80)
- Spouse: Barbara Grosvenor (after 1929)
- Relations: James Keith Fraser (grandfather)
- Children: 2
- Parent(s): George Rous, 3rd Earl of Stradbroke; Helena Fraser
- Education: Royal Naval College, Osborne; Royal Naval College, Dartmouth

John Anthony Alexander Rous, 4th Earl of Stradbroke, KStJ (1 April 1903 – 14 July 1983), was a British nobleman, the son of George Rous, 3rd Earl of Stradbroke. He was styled Viscount Dunwich from birth until acceding to the earldom in 1947.

== Early life ==
He was the eldest son of George Rous, 3rd Earl of Stradbroke and the former Helena Violet Alice Fraser (d. 1949). His mother was the daughter of Lt.-Gen. James Keith Fraser (a younger son of Lt.-Col. Sir James John Fraser, 3rd Baronet).

He was educated at the Royal Naval College, Osborne, and the Royal Naval College, Dartmouth.

== Career ==
He served from 1917 to 1928 and again, through World War II, between 1939 and 1945. He was Secretary to the Governor of Victoria from 1946 to 1947. He was a member of East Suffolk County Council from 1931 to 1945; and an Alderman from 1953 to 1964. In 1978 he was awarded the Scout Association's prestigious Silver Wolf Award.

== Personal life ==
On 15 January 1929, Rous married Barbara Grosvenor, daughter of Lt.-Col. Lord Arthur Hugh Grosvenor and Helen Sheffield (a daughter of Sir Robert Sheffield, 5th Baronet). Her maternal grandparents were Hugh Grosvenor, 1st Duke of Westminster and Lady Constance Sutherland-Leveson-Gower (fourth daughter of the 2nd Duke of Sutherland). Together, they were the parents of:

- Lady Marye Violet Isolde Rous (1930–2012)
- Lady Penelope Anne Rous (1932–2019), who married Commander Ian Dudley Stewart Forbes, son of Lt.-Col. James Stewart Forbes, in 1950. They were divorced in 1960 and she married John Cator, son of Lt.-Col. Henry John Cator, in 1961. They divorced in 1969 and she married Anthony James Gilbey, son of Quintin Holland Gilbey, in 1984.

He was succeeded by his brother William Rous, 5th Earl of Stradbroke.

Court offices
Preceded by The Earl of Stradbroke	Lord Lieutenant of Suffolk; 1948–1978	Succeeded by Sir Joshua Rowley, Bt
Peerage of the United Kingdom
Preceded by George Rous	Earl of Stradbroke; 1947–1983	Succeeded by William Rous
