= Ken Major =

British architect and author (1928–2009)

- Born: 21 October 1928; Reading, Berkshire
- Died: 25 July 2009 (aged 80); Reading, Berkshire
- Education: Leigh Boys' Grammar School, Kendal School
- Alma mater: King's College, Newcastle upon Tyne
- Occupation: Architect
- Known for: Building preservation Molinologist; Chairman of the Mills Section of the Society for the Protection of Ancient Buildings (1978–84); Chairman of The International Molinological Society (1977–93); Trustee of the Mills Archive Trust (2002–09); Vice-Chairman, Society for the Protection of Ancient Buildings (2002–09); Chairman, Conservation Group, Royal Institute of British Architects
- Spouse: Helen Lawrence
- Parent(s): John William Major, Katharine May Major (née Ridges)
- Awards: Lethaby Scholarship; Esher Award

John Kenneth Major ARIBA, FSA, popularly known as Ken Major (21 October 1928 – 25 July 2009) was an architect, author and world authority on industrial archaeology, particularly windmills, watermills and animal-powered machines. As an author, he was known as J Kenneth Major.

== Early life ==
Ken Major was born in Reading, Berkshire on 21 October 1928. His parents were Katharine May Major (née Ridge) and John William Major. He was christened John Kenneth Major but owing to a number of John Majors in the family he was generally referred to as Ken.

Major attended the Boy's Grammar School at Leigh, Lancashire, where his father was the headmaster, from 1939 to 1945. He then attended a school in Kendal until 1946. Major was interested in ancient buildings from an early age. He recalled cycling to Winwick church aged 8 to see the carved pig (symbolic of a legend about the church being relocated to a pre-Christian site) there.

== Higher education ==
Owing to the high number of demobbed ex-servicemen, Major was unable to gain a place at Cambridge where his results would have enabled him to study mathematics. He was able to obtain a place at King's College, Durham University in Newcastle upon Tyne where he studied architecture under the Beaux-Arts regime.

During his time at King's College, Major switched from design to repair. He visited Florence, Italy where he studied the repair of Renaissance buildings damaged in the war. In 1952, he applied for and obtained the Lethaby Scholarship from the Society for the Protection of Ancient Buildings (SPAB).

== Career ==
=== Professional ===
On completing his Scholarship in April 1953, Major was appointed as an architect at the Planning Department of Imperial College, London. In April 1954, he married Helen Lawrence after a four-year courtship. They both had an interest in ancient building and in 1958 the purchase of a Lambretta scooter enabled them to travel further afield. In 1956, Major joined London Transport where his work involved the design of bus garages. In May 1961, Major visited the Hudson River to research the construction of a watermill at Sleepy Hollow. As the original settlers of Tarrytown and Sleepy Hollow had come from East Anglia, measured drawings of Woodbridge Tide Mill were prepared to assist the restoration.

On his return from the United States, Major joined architect and goldsmith Louis Osman as his assistant. His main work while with Osman was the restoration of Ranston House, Iwerne Courtney, Dorset. In July 1963, Major joined Morgan and Branch, architects. He was involved in the redevelopment of Doncaster town centre including a new cinema for ABC and a new library.

After this, Major then joined Hammersmith Borough Council where he was in charge of the building of the White City scheme. The scheme was cancelled and Major joined Westminster City Council where he was in charge of a scheme at Lisson Green, which was in limbo after the Ronan Point disaster. Following this, Major was in charge of the redevelopment of parts of Westbourne Grove where 101 properties formerly owned by Peter Rachman were repaired and converted to make them suitable for use by council tenants. Major later took charge of Westminster City Council's maintenance team. In 1975, Major was appointed Assistant City Architect to Westminster City Council. In 1984 his department was closed by the Council and Major commenced practice on his own account.

Initial work in private practice involved finishing off various schemes from Westminster City Council. Major was involved in the restoration of the waterwheel (36 feet (10.97 m) diameter and 2 feet 9 inches (0.84 m) wide) at Painshill Park, Cobham, Surrey. Other work included the repair of Stainsby Mill, Doe Lea, Derbyshire, Gelli Groes mill, Gwent and Sacrewell Mill, Wansford, Cambridgeshire. As well as mills, Major was involved in conservation and restoration of a number of churches. Other buildings Major was involved with include Churchgate House, Cookham, Berkshire and a 13th-century cottage at Mowsley, Leicestershire.

=== Molinological ===
In 1963, Rex Wailes invited Major to assist him in carrying out a survey of mills in Berkshire. Following this, the Isle of Wight, Northumberland and Wiltshire were covered. Major also conducted a survey of the Kennet and Avon Canal, listing all artefacts surviving and producing a map at a scale of 2 inches to the mile (1:31,680). The resulting map was 18 feet (5.49 m) long.

In 1964, Major met João Miguel dos Santos Simões who was at that time trying to get the various individual mill societies together. This led to the formation of The International Molinological Society in 1973, of which Major was a founder member. Major became chairman in 1977 and remained in that position until 1993. In 1970, Major's first book, Mills of the Isle of Wight was published. The publishing in 1978 of Animal-Powered Engines marked the first in-depth study of that subject.

Apart from his work for the SPAB, Major was also an advisor for other national heritage organisations, such as English Heritage, The Heritage Lottery Fund and other bodies concerned with mill preservation. He was also a founding trustee of the Mills Archive Trust.

== Death ==
Major died on 25 July 2009 after a short illness. His funeral took place on 6 August 2009 at Reading Crematorium.

== Books ==
Ken Major was the author of a number of books.

- Finch Brothers' Foundry, Sticklepath, Devon. David & Charles. 1967. (see Finch Foundry)
- The Mills of the Isle of Wight. Charles Skilton. 1970. (see List of windmills in the Isle of Wight)
- Finch Brothers' Foundry, Sticklepath, Devon. David & Charles. 1974.
- Techniques of Industrial Archaeology. David & Charles. 1974. ISBN 978-0-7153-6393-5.
- Fieldwork in Industrial Archaeology. London: Batsford. 1975.
- The Windmills of John Wallis Titt. The International Molinological Society. 1977. (see John Wallis Titt, Crux Easton wind engine)
- Animal-Powered Engines. London: Batsford. 1978. (see List of horse mills)
- Robert Stone, Miller of Pangbourne. The International Molinological Society. 1980.
- Victorian and Edwardian Windmills and Watermills. London: Batsford. 1983. ISBN 0-7134-0621-6.
- The Éolienne Bollée. The International Molinological Society. 1985. (see Éolienne Bollée)
- Animal-Powered Machines. Aylesbury: Shire Publications. 1985. ISBN 0-85263-710-1.
- Watermills and Windmills – A National Trust Pocketbook. Bromley: The National Trust. 1986. ISBN 0-7117-0176-8.
- Rex Wailes, An Appreciation of his Work. Mills Section, Society for the Protection of Ancient Buildings. 1990. (see Rex Wailes)
