= Mills Archive =

Heritage archive in Reading, England

The Mills Archive Trust
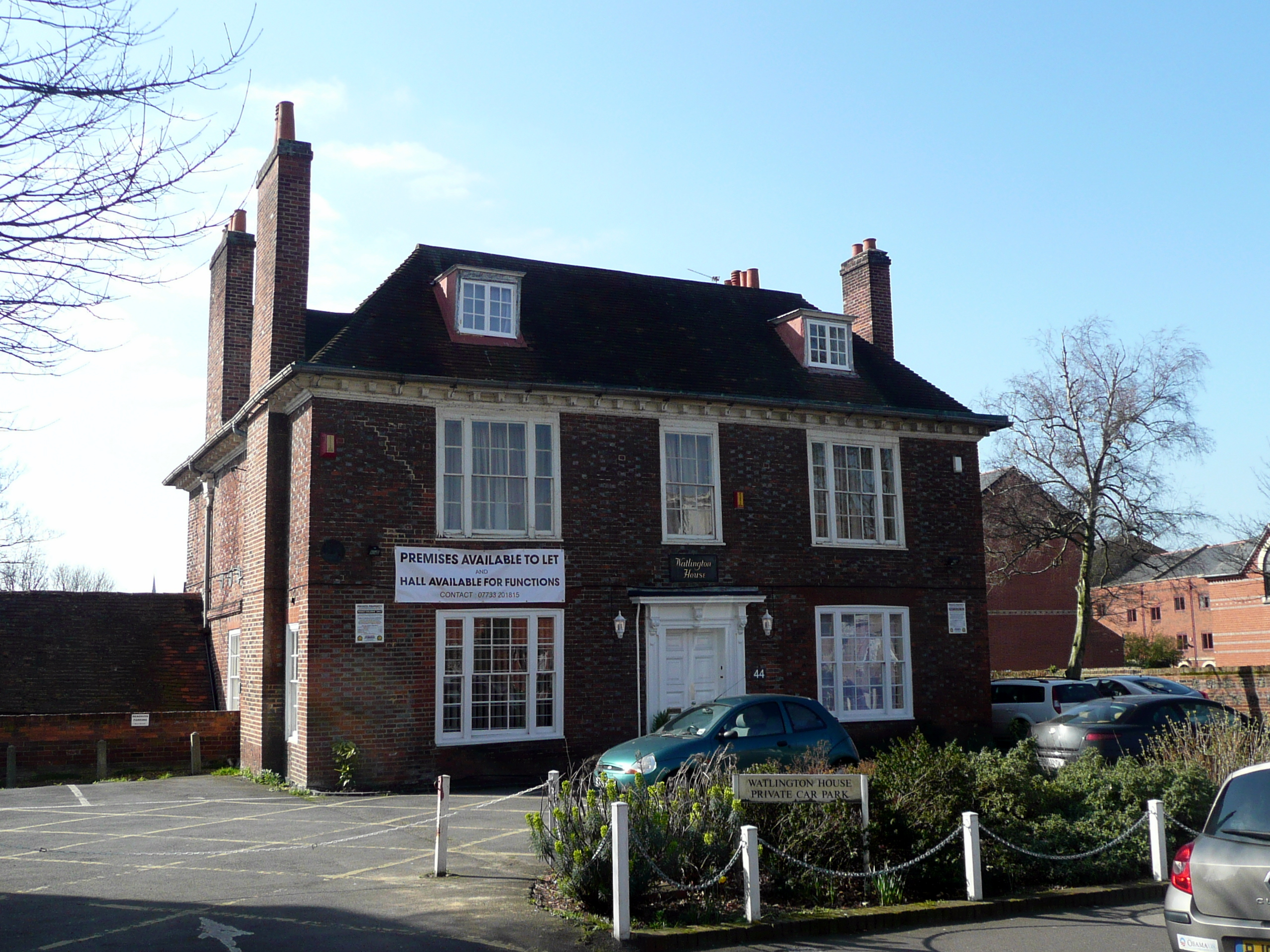
- Watlington House
- Formation: 2002
- Type: Educational Charity, Archive
- Legal status: Registered Charity
- Purpose: The preservation of documents related to wind and water power, from mills to turbines
- Headquarters: 44 Watlington St, Reading RG1 4RJ
- Region served: Global with an emphasis on the United Kingdom
- Chairman: Dr Ron Cookson MBE
- Director: Elizabeth Bartram
- Staff: 4
- Volunteers: 20
- Website: https://new.millsarchive.org/

The Mills Archive was established in 2002 to preserve and protect records of milling heritage and to make them freely available to the public. It is governed by the Mills Archive Trust, which is a charity. It is a nationally accredited archive service and is based at Watlington House, Reading, Berkshire, England. The archive contains a wealth of photos, documents and artefacts; more than 3 million items, an online catalogue with more than 90,000 records and a specialist library with 6,000 books and journals.

== History ==
The Mills Archive Trust was established in 2002. A grant of £50,000 from the Heritage Lottery Fund enabled the Archive to launch its internet catalogue in 2003. Other early supporters of the trust included the Society for the Protection of Ancient Buildings (SPAB), and the Hampshire Mills Group, which donated £200.

The Archive was set up in response to an expressed need to preserve and where possible integrate the various threatened sources of information on the windmills and watermills of the UK and the rest of the world. It was hoped to prevent material being lost on the death of a molinologist by creating a suitable repository.

The Chairman Dr Ron Cookson was awarded an MBE in the 2012 Birthday Honours for Services to Heritage.

Originally a charitable trust (Reg no 1091534), the trust became a foundation-style charitable incorporated organisation (Reg no 1155828) in February 2014. In November 2016, the Archive was awarded the status of a Nationally Accredited Archive Service.

== Aims ==
The Archive aims to focus on (but not be totally restricted to) traditional mills and milling, and seeks to acquire relevant historical and contemporary documentary and illustrative material and small artefacts. The main initial priority is records relating to UK mills, millers and millwrights, chiefly during the 18th–21st centuries, but the Archive plans to extend its coverage worldwide.

"Traditional mills" include mills, similar structures and industrial processes that are or were powered by wind, water, muscle or other power sources, but not the massive modern industrial mills used for steel production and similar large-scale industrial enterprises. "Milling" includes millwrighting and the place of the mill in social and economic as well as technological and architectural history.

== Collections and services ==
The Mills Archive was originally set up to care for four historically important Foundation Collections: those belonging to the SPAB, Mildred Cookson, Ken Major and Alan Stoyel. Since its establishment it has been given more than 250 further collections, both large and small.

The Archive currently holds more than 3,000,000 items, most of which can be freely inspected by appointment at the Research Centre at Watlington House. Its catalogue is free to use, contains some 80,000 records and is rapidly expanding. The Archive also maintains a library containing more than 3,000 books on mills, in various languages. Most have been added to the online library catalogue. Apart from its wide use as a source of information about mills and their machinery in archival documents, books and journals, the Mills Archive has become a focus for family history researchers.

More information can be found on the Archive's main website.
