= Windmill =

Machine that makes use of wind energy to mill grain

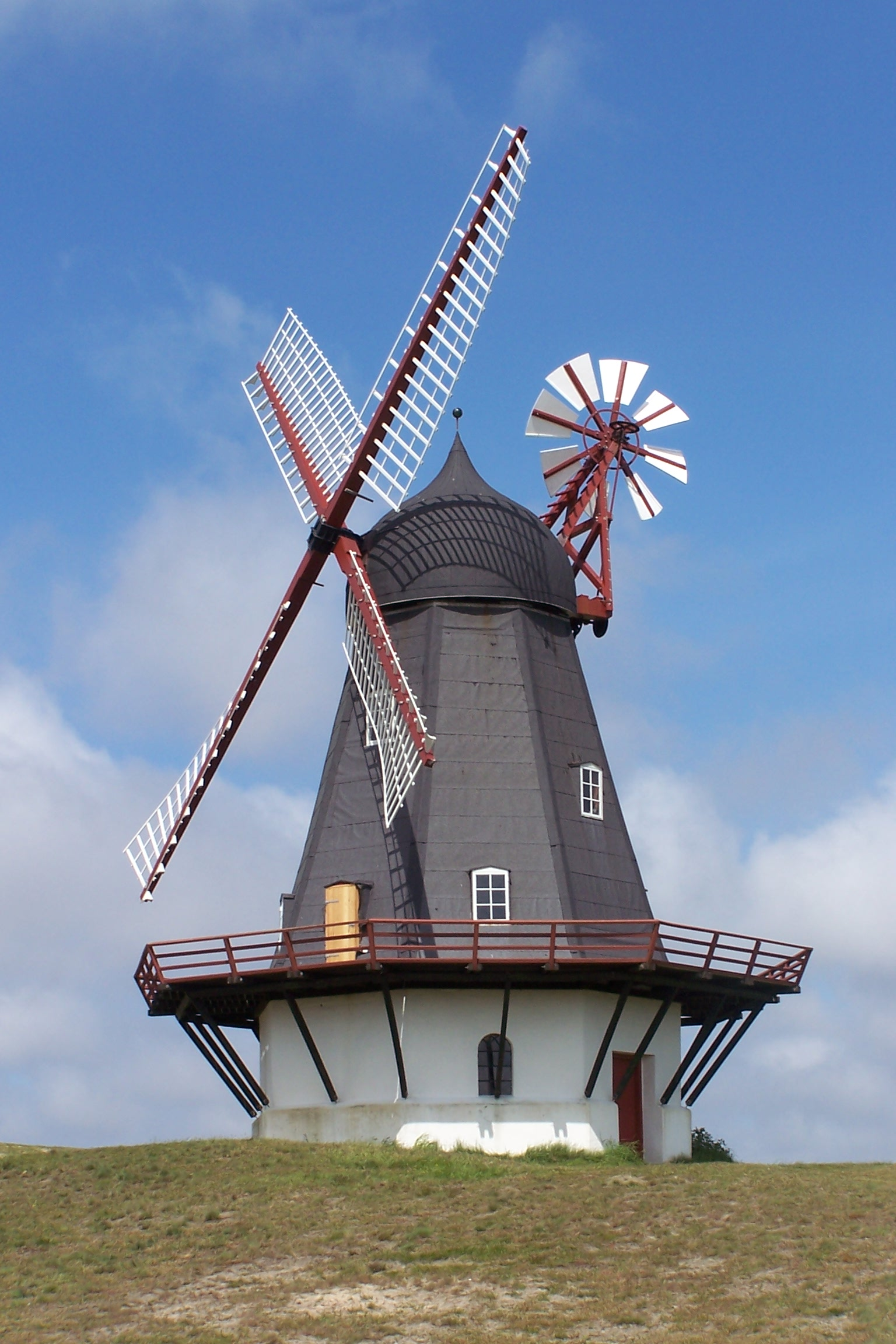
Windmill in Sønderho, Fanø, Denmark. Dutch type, built in 1895.

A windmill is a machine operated by the force of wind acting on vanes or sails to mill grain (gristmills). Windmills were used throughout the high medieval and early modern periods; the horizontal or panemone windmill first appeared in Persia during the 9th century, and the vertical windmill first appeared in northwestern Europe in the 12th century.

== Forerunners ==
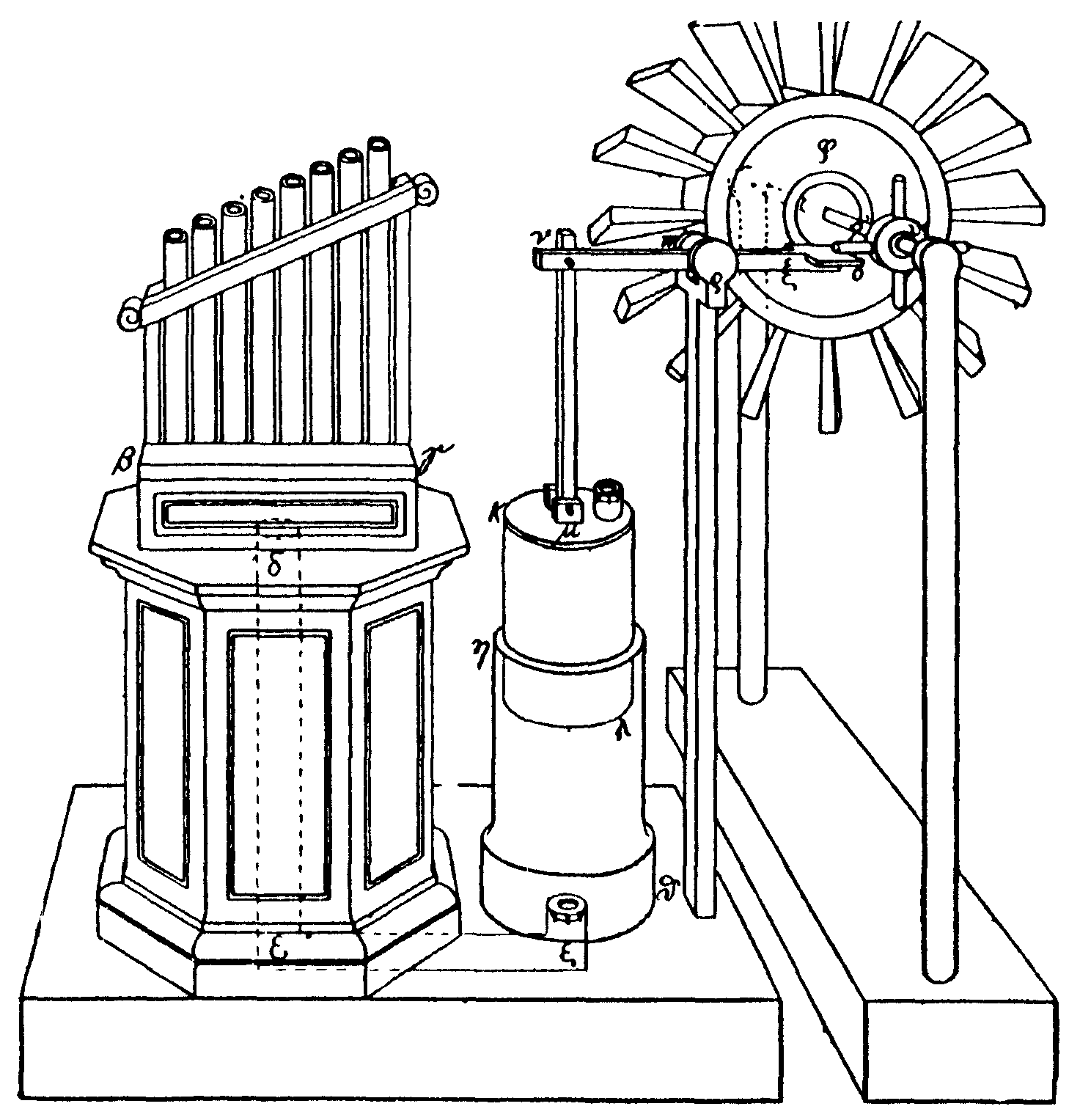
A 19th-century reconstruction of Heron's wind-powered organ

Wind-powered machines have been used earlier. The Babylonian emperor Hammurabi had used wind mill power for his irrigation project in Mesopotamia in the 17th century BC.

Later, Hero of Alexandria (Heron) in first-century Roman Egypt described what appears to be a wind-driven wheel to power a machine. His description of a wind-powered organ is not a practical windmill but was either an early wind-powered toy or a design concept for a wind-powered machine that may or may not have been a working device, as there is ambiguity in the text and issues with the design. Another early example of a wind-driven wheel was the prayer wheel, which is believed to have been first used in Tibet and China, though there is uncertainty over the date of its first appearance, which could have been either c. 400, the 7th century, or after the 9th century.

Historical evidence does not support the existence of windmills prior to the ninth century CE. One of the earliest recorded working windmill designs found was invented sometime around 700–900 AD in Persia. This design was the panemone, with vertical lightweight wooden sails attached by horizontal struts to a central vertical shaft. It was first built to pump water and subsequently modified to grind grain as well.

== Horizontal windmills ==
The Persian horizontal windmill, the first practical windmill

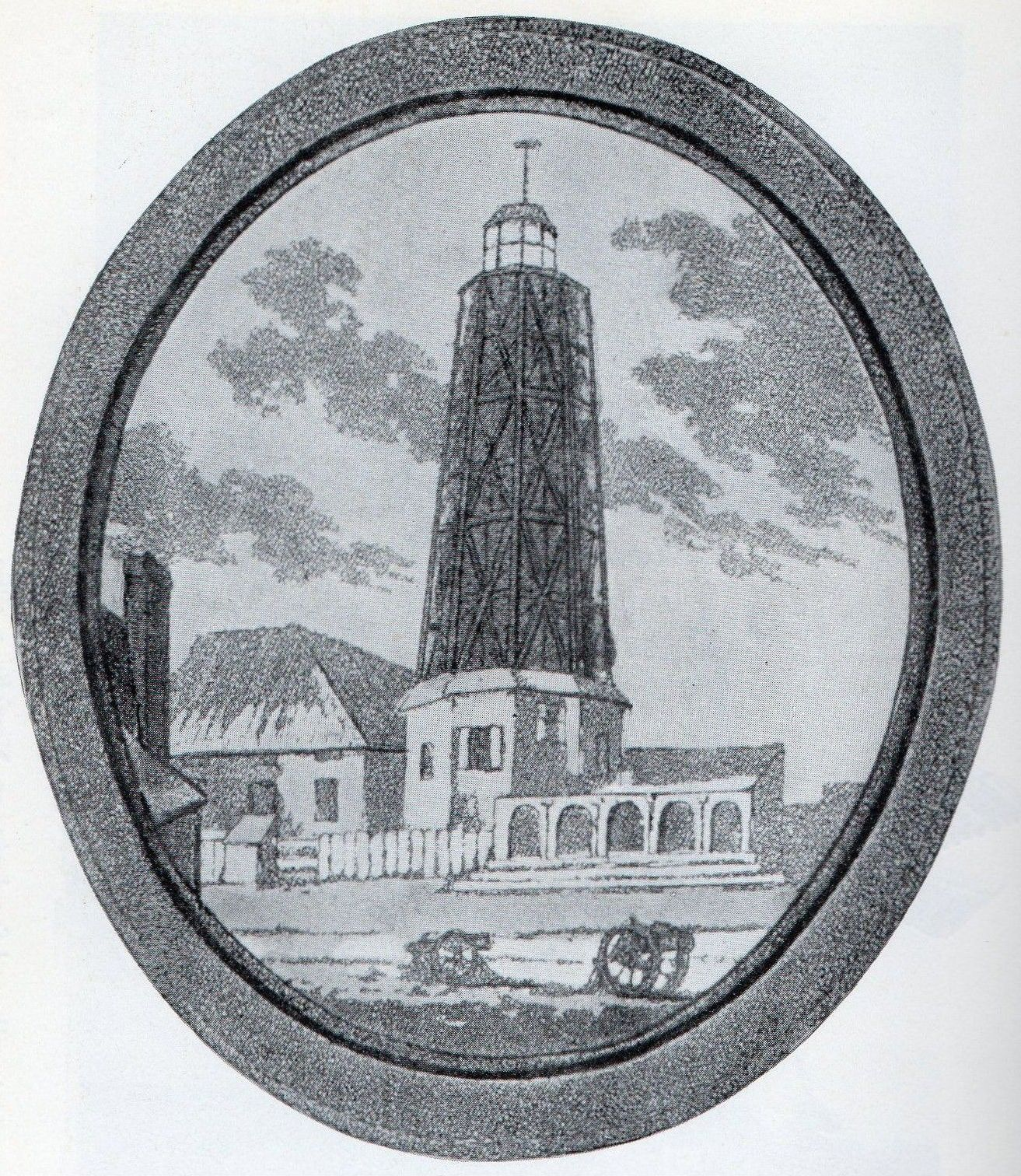
Hooper's Mill, Margate, Kent, an eighteenth-century European horizontal windmill

The first practical windmills were panemone windmills, using sails that rotated in a horizontal plane, around a vertical axis. Made of six to 12 sails covered in reed matting or cloth material, these windmills were used to grind grain or draw up water. A medieval account reports that windmill technology was used in Persia and the Middle East during the reign of Rashidun caliph Umar ibn al-Khattab (r. 634–644), based on the caliph's conversation with a Persian builder slave. The authenticity of part of the anecdote involving the caliph Umar is questioned because it was recorded only in the 10th century. The Persian geographer Estakhri reported windmills being operated in Khorasan (Eastern Iran and Western Afghanistan) already in the 9th century. Such windmills were in widespread use across the Middle East and Central Asia and later spread to Europe, China, and India from there. By the 11th century, the vertical-axle windmill had reached parts of Southern Europe, including the Iberian Peninsula (via Al-Andalus) and the Aegean Sea (in the Balkans). A similar type of horizontal windmill with rectangular blades, used for irrigation, can also be found in thirteenth-century China (during the Jurchen Jin dynasty in the north), introduced by the travels of Yelü Chucai to Turkestan in 1219.

Vertical-axle windmills were built, in small numbers, in Europe during the 18th and nineteenth centuries, for example Fowler's Mill at Battersea in London, and Hooper's Mill at Margate in Kent. These early modern examples seem not to have been directly influenced by the vertical-axle windmills of the medieval period, but to have been independent inventions by 18th-century engineers.

== Vertical windmills ==
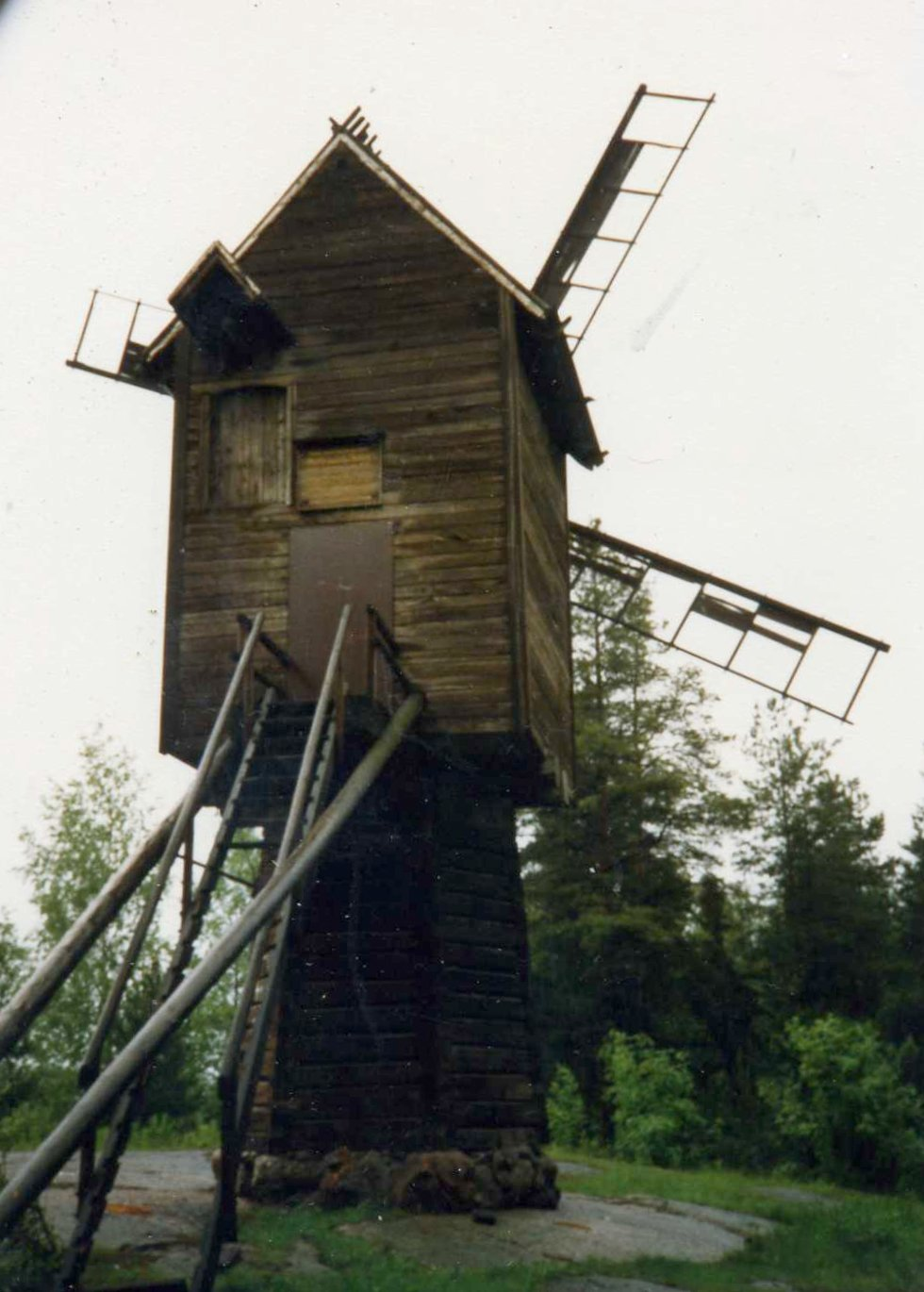
A windmill in Kotka, Finland in May 1987

The horizontal-axis or vertical windmill (so called due to the plane of the movement of its sails) is a development of the 12th century, first used in northwestern Europe, in the triangle of northern France, eastern England and Flanders. It is unclear whether the vertical windmill was influenced by the introduction of the horizontal windmill from Persia-Middle East to Southern Europe in the preceding century.

The earliest certain reference to a windmill in Northern Europe (assumed to have been of the vertical type) dates from 1185, in the former village of Weedley in Yorkshire which was located at the southern tip of the Wold overlooking the Humber Estuary. Several earlier, but less certainly dated, 12th-century European sources referring to windmills have also been found. These earliest mills were used to grind cereals.

=== Post mill ===
The evidence at present is that the earliest type of European windmill was the post mill, so named because of the large upright post on which the mill's main structure (the "body" or "buck") is balanced. By mounting the body this way, the mill can rotate to face the wind direction; an essential requirement for windmills to operate economically in north-western Europe, where wind directions are variable. The body contains all the milling machinery. The first post mills were of the sunken type, where the post was buried in an earth mound to support it. Later, a wooden support was developed called the trestle. This was often covered over or surrounded by a roundhouse to protect the trestle from the weather and to provide storage space. This type of windmill was the most common in Europe until the 19th century when more powerful tower and smock mills replaced them.

==== Hollow-post mill ====
In a hollow-post mill, the post on which the body is mounted is hollowed out, to accommodate the drive shaft. This makes it possible to drive machinery below or outside the body while still being able to rotate the body into the wind. Hollow-post mills driving scoop wheels were used in the Netherlands to drain wetlands since the early 15th century onwards.

=== Tower mill ===
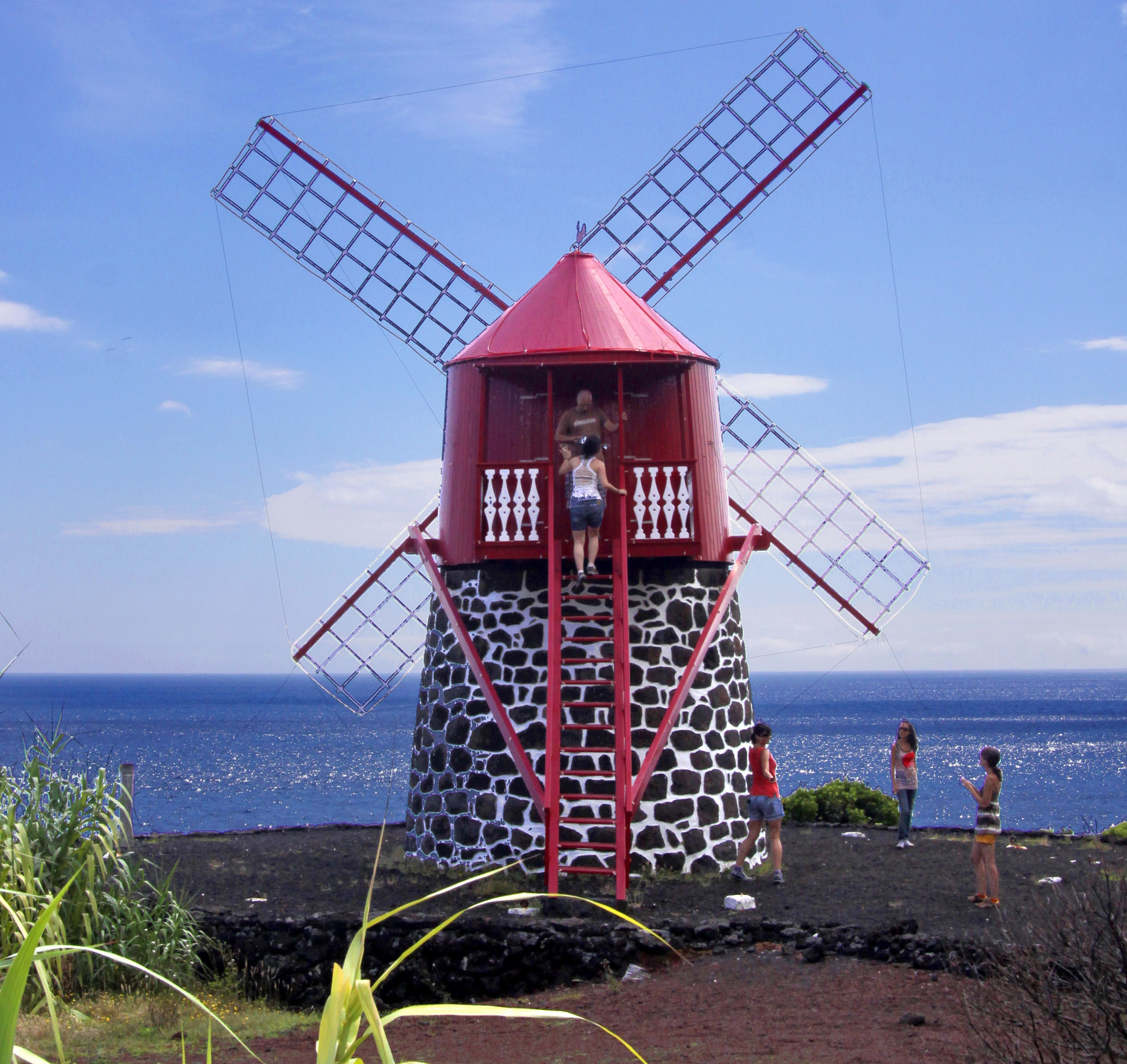
Windmill in the Azores islands, Portugal

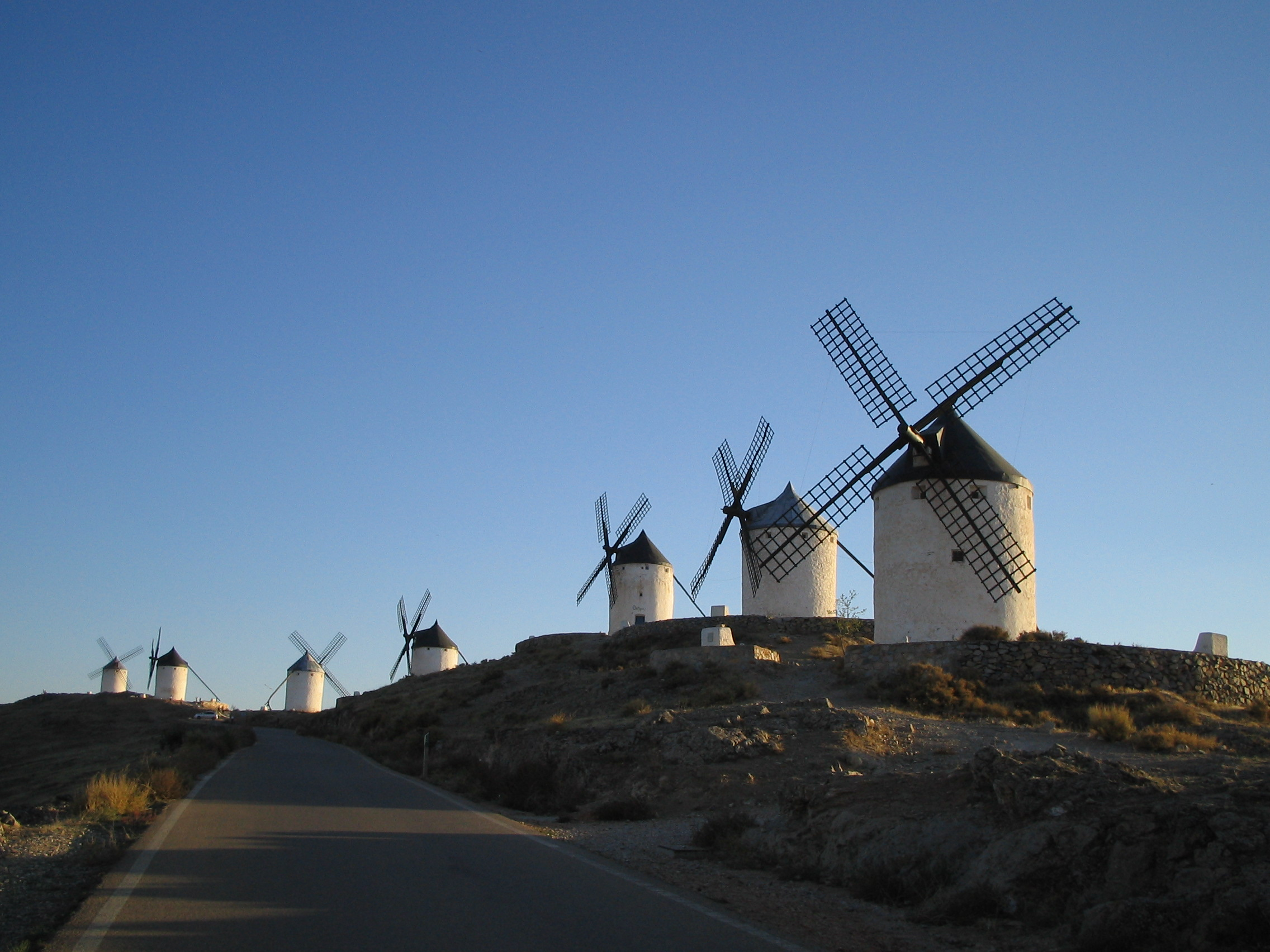
Tower mills in Consuegra, Spain

By the end of the 13th century, the masonry tower mill, on which only the cap is rotated rather than the whole body of the mill, had been introduced. The spread of tower mills came with a growing economy that called for larger and more stable sources of power, though they were more expensive to build. In contrast to the post mill, only the cap of the tower mill needs to be turned into the wind, so the main structure can be made much taller, allowing the sails to be made longer, which enables them to provide useful work even in low winds. The cap can be turned into the wind either by winches or gearing inside the cap or from a winch on the tail pole outside the mill. A method of keeping the cap and sails into the wind automatically is by using a fantail, a small windmill mounted at right angles to the sails, at the rear of the windmill. These are also fitted to tail poles of post mills and are common in Great Britain and English-speaking countries of the former British Empire, Denmark, and Germany but rare in other places. Around some parts of the Mediterranean Sea, tower mills with fixed caps were built because the wind's direction varied little most of the time.

=== Smock mill ===
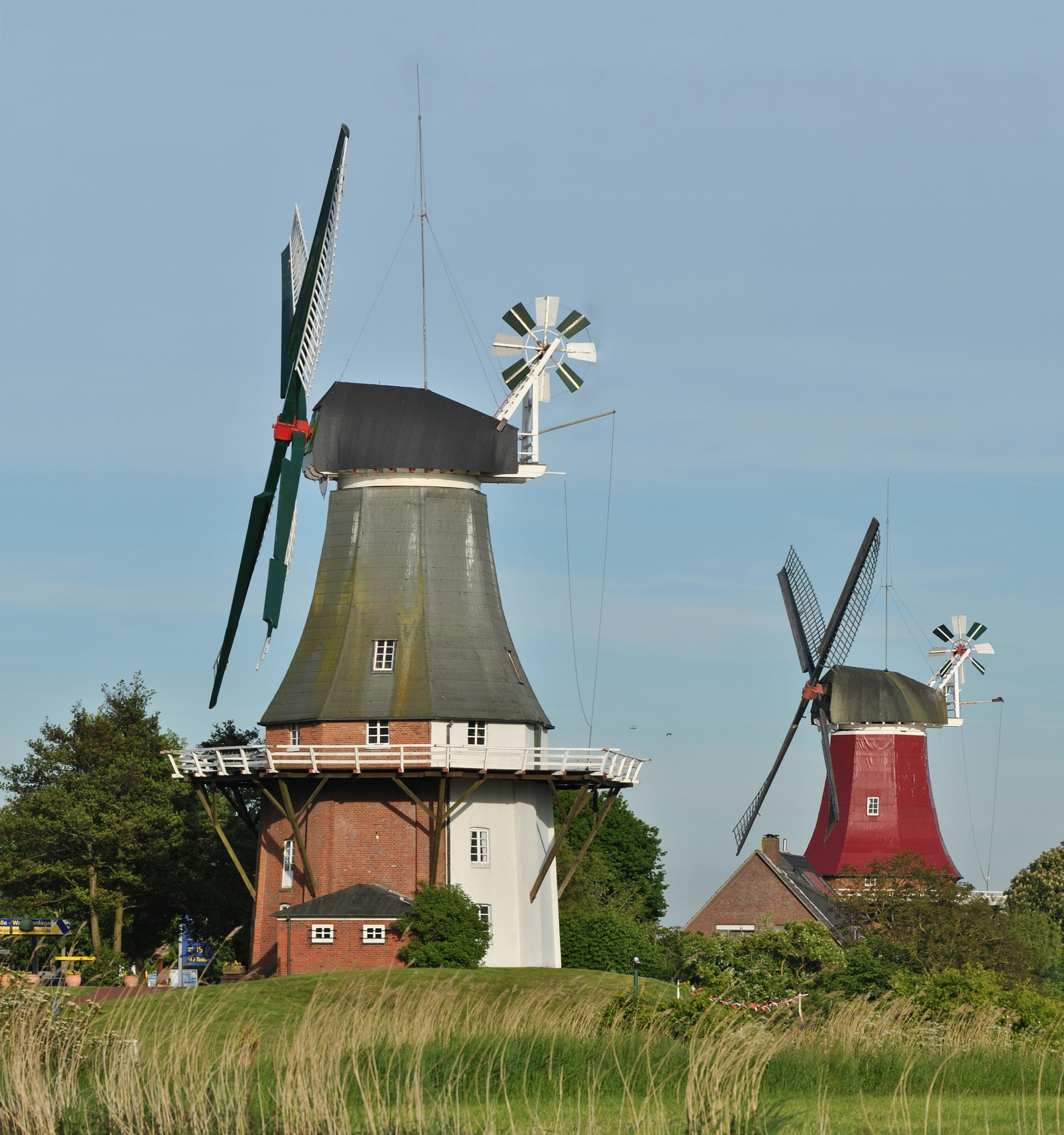
Two smock mills with a stage in Greetsiel, Germany

The smock mill is a later development of the tower mill, where the masonry tower is replaced by a wooden framework, called the "smock", which is thatched, boarded, or covered by other materials, such as slate, sheet metal, or tar paper. The smock is commonly of octagonal plan, though there are examples with different numbers of sides.

Smock windmills were introduced by the Dutch in the 17th century to overcome the limitations of tower windmills, which were expensive to build and could not be erected on wet surfaces. The lower half of the smock windmill was made of brick, while the upper half was made of wood, with a sloping tower shape that added structural strength to the design. This made them lightweight and able to be erected on unstable ground.

The smock windmill design included a small turbine in the back that helped the main mill to face the direction of the wind.

== Mechanics ==
=== Sails ===
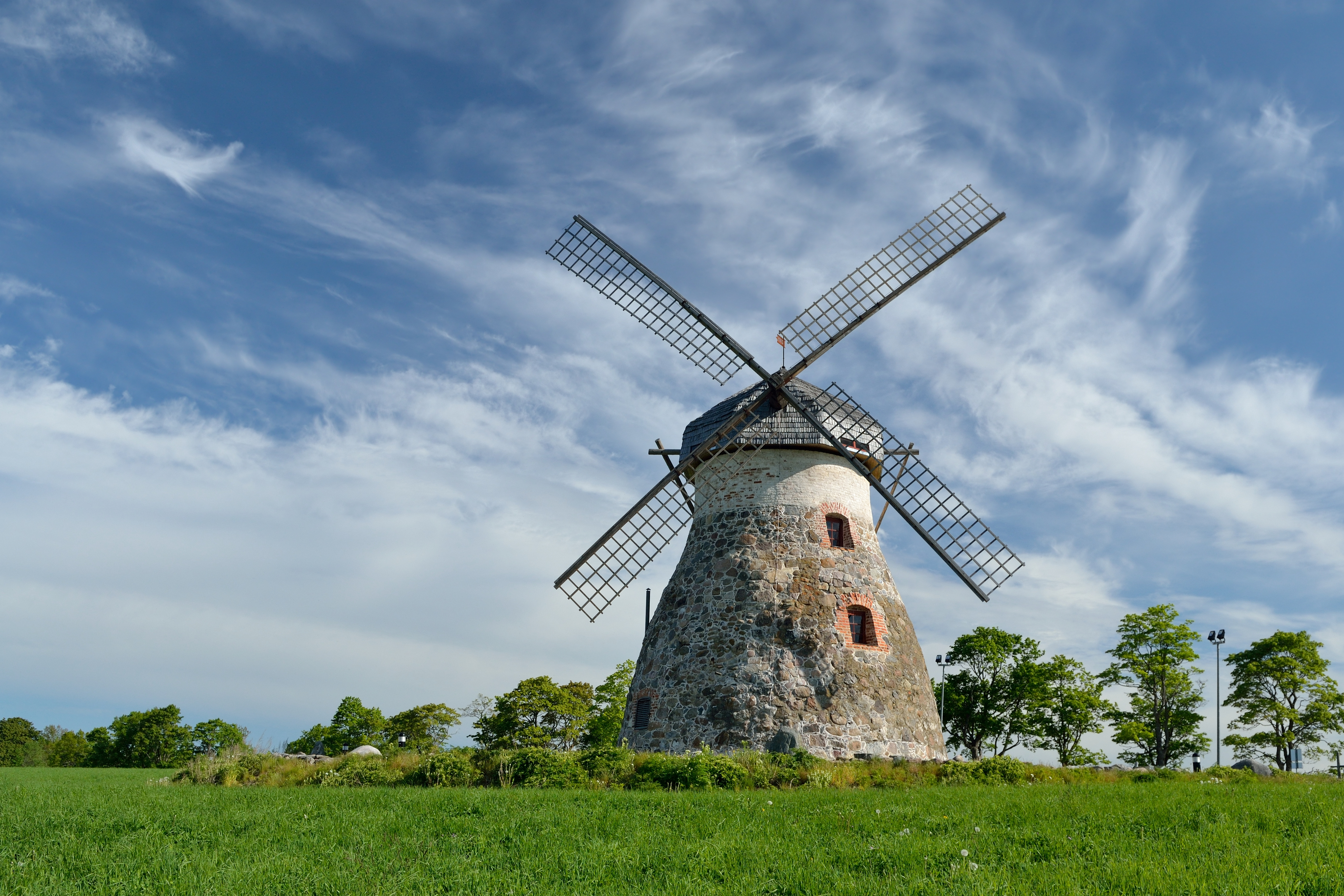
Windmill in Kuremaa, Estonia

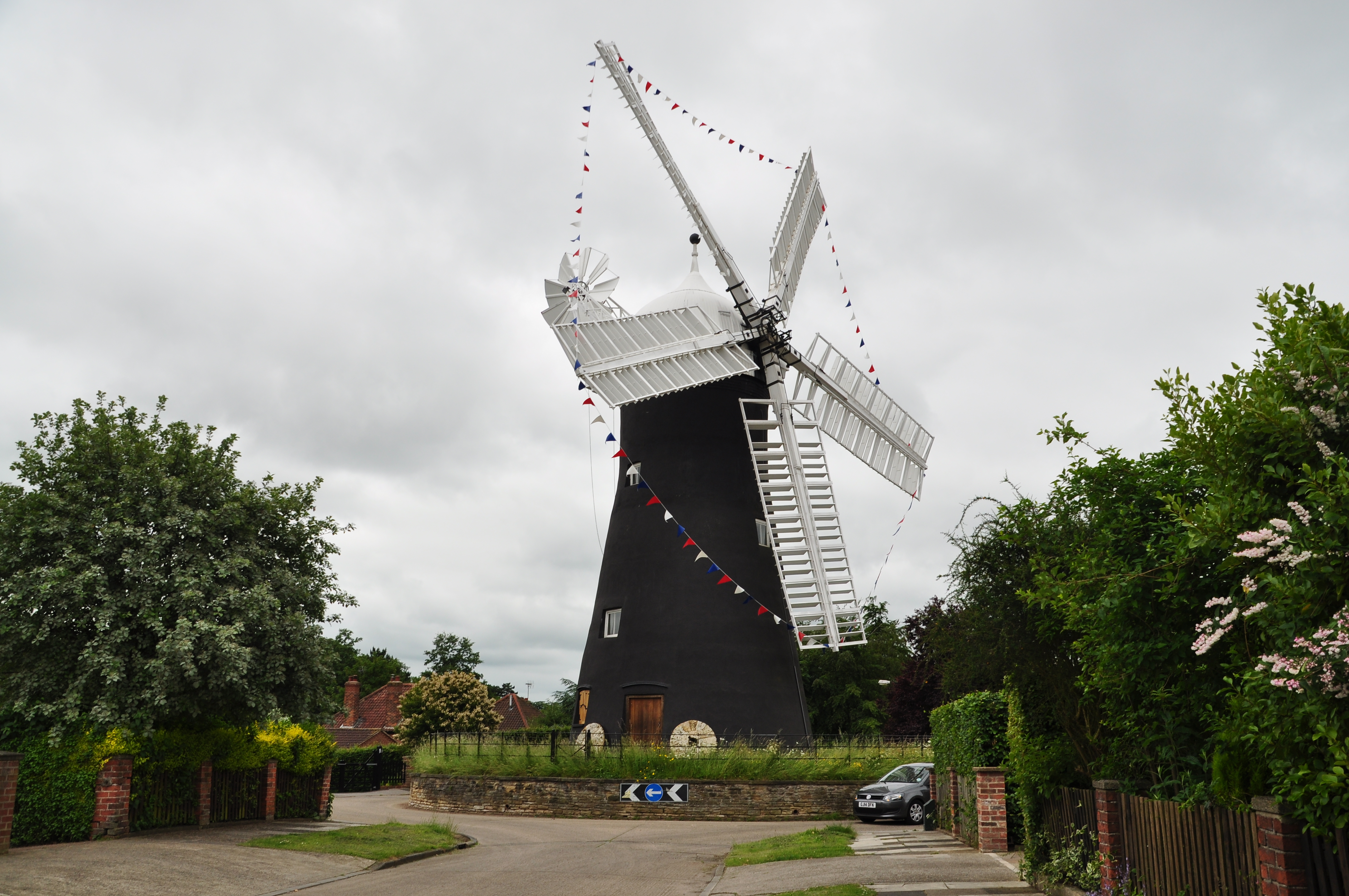
5-sail Holgate windmill in York, England

Common sails consist of a lattice framework on which the sailcloth is spread. The miller can adjust the amount of cloth spread according to the wind and the power needed. In medieval mills, the sailcloth was wound in and out of a ladder-type arrangement of sails. Later mill sails had a lattice framework over which the sailcloth was spread, while in colder climates, the cloth was replaced by wooden slats, which were easier to handle in freezing conditions. The jib sail is commonly found in Mediterranean countries and consists of a simple triangle of cloth wound round a spar.

In all cases, the mill needs to be stopped to adjust the sails. Inventions in Great Britain in the late eighteenth and nineteenth centuries led to sails that automatically adjust to the wind speed without the need for the miller to intervene, culminating in patent sails invented by William Cubitt in 1807. In these sails, the cloth is replaced by a mechanism of connected shutters.

In France, Pierre-Théophile Berton invented a system consisting of longitudinal wooden slats connected by a mechanism that lets the miller open them while the mill is turning. In the twentieth century, increased knowledge of aerodynamics from the development of the airplane led to further improvements in efficiency by German engineer Bilau and several Dutch millwrights. The majority of windmills have four sails. Multiple-sailed mills, with five, six, or eight sails, were built in Great Britain (especially in and around the counties of Lincolnshire and Yorkshire), Germany, and less commonly elsewhere. Earlier multiple-sailed mills are found in Spain, Portugal, Greece, parts of Romania, Bulgaria, and Russia. A mill with an even number of sails has the advantage of being able to run with a damaged sail by removing both the damaged sail and the one opposite, which does not unbalance the mill.

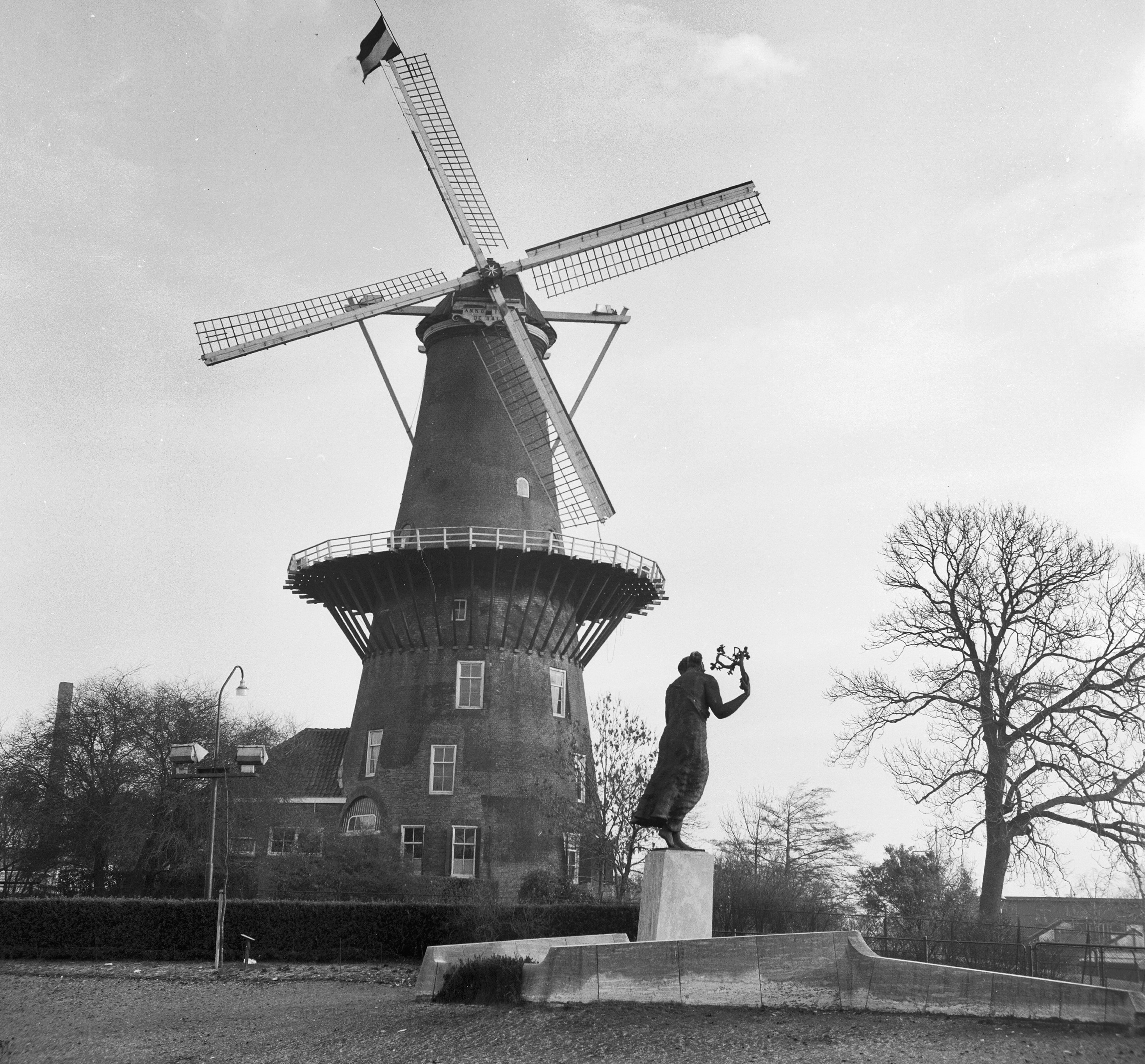
De Valk windmill in mourning position following the death of Queen Wilhelmina of the Netherlands in 1962

In the Netherlands, the stationary position of the sails, i.e. when the mill is not working, has long been used to give signals. If the blades are stopped in a "+" sign (3-6-9-12 o'clock), the windmill is open for business. When the blades are stopped in an "X" configuration, the windmill is closed or not functional. A slight tilt of the sails (top blade at 1 o'clock) signals joy, such as the birth of a healthy baby. A tilt of the blades to 11-2-5-8 o'clock signals mourning, or warning. It was used to signal the local region during Nazi operations in World War II, such as searches for Jews. Across the Netherlands, windmills were placed in mourning positions in honor of the Dutch victims of the 2014 Malaysian Airlines Flight 17 shootdown.

=== Machinery ===
Gears inside a windmill convey power from the rotary motion of the sails to a mechanical device. The sails are carried on the horizontal windshaft. Windshafts can be wholly made of wood, wood with a cast iron pole end (where the sails are mounted), or entirely of cast iron. The brake wheel is fitted onto the windshaft between the front and rear bearings. It has the brake around the outside of the rim and teeth in the side of the rim which drives the horizontal gearwheel called wallower on the top end of the vertical upright shaft. In grist mills, the great spur wheel, lower down the upright shaft, drives one or more stone nuts on the shafts driving each millstone. Post mills sometimes have a head and/or tail wheel driving the stone nuts directly, instead of the spur gear arrangement. Additional gear wheels drive a sack hoist or other machinery. The machinery differs if the windmill is used for other applications than milling grain. A drainage mill uses another set of gear wheels on the bottom end of the upright shaft to drive a scoop wheel or Archimedes' screw. Sawmills uses a crankshaft to provide a reciprocating motion to the saws. Windmills have been used to power many other industrial processes, including paper mills, threshing mills, and to process oil seeds, wool, paints, and stone products.

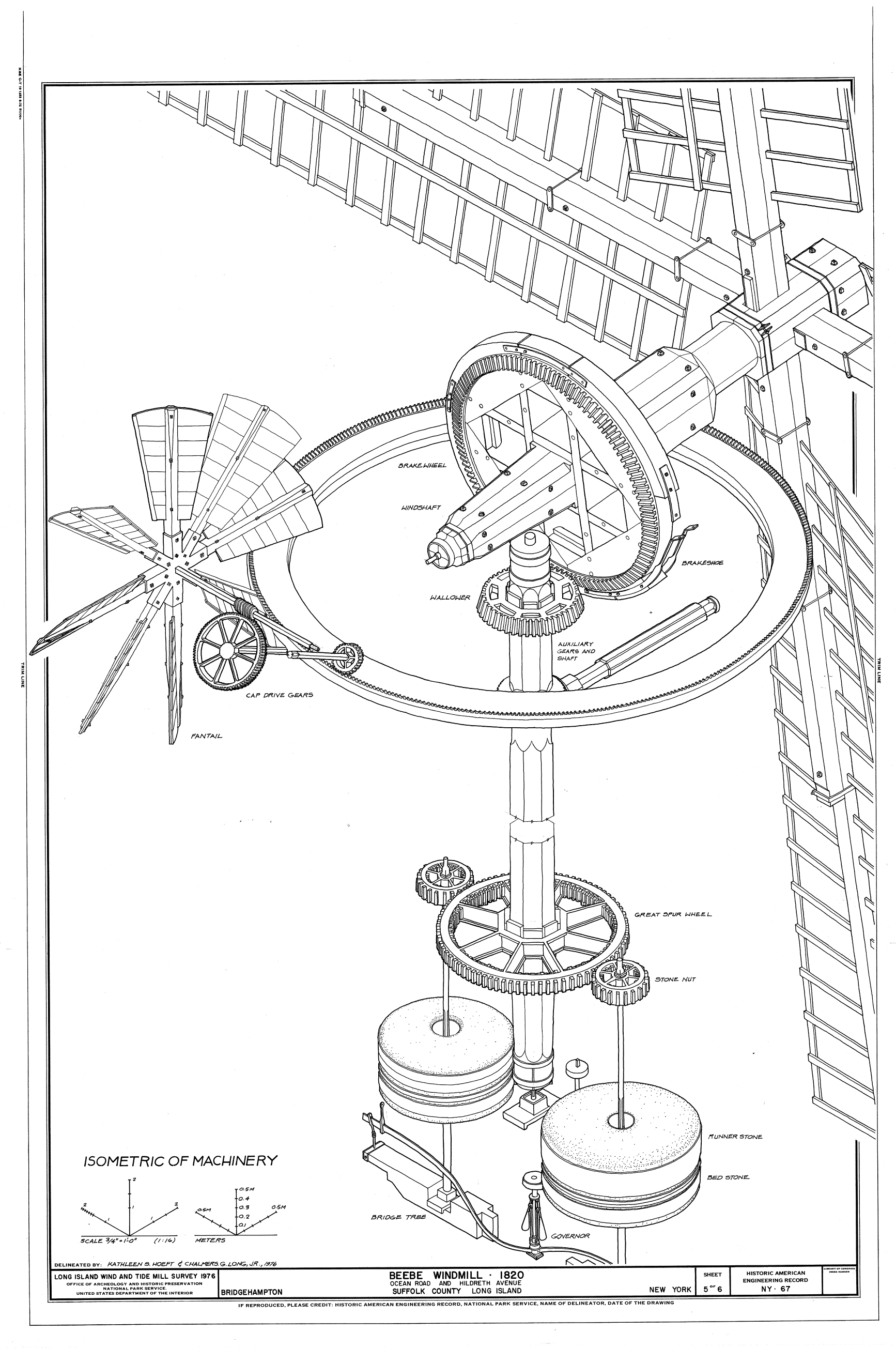
An isometric drawing of the machinery of the Beebe Windmill

Diagram of the smock mill at Meopham, Kent

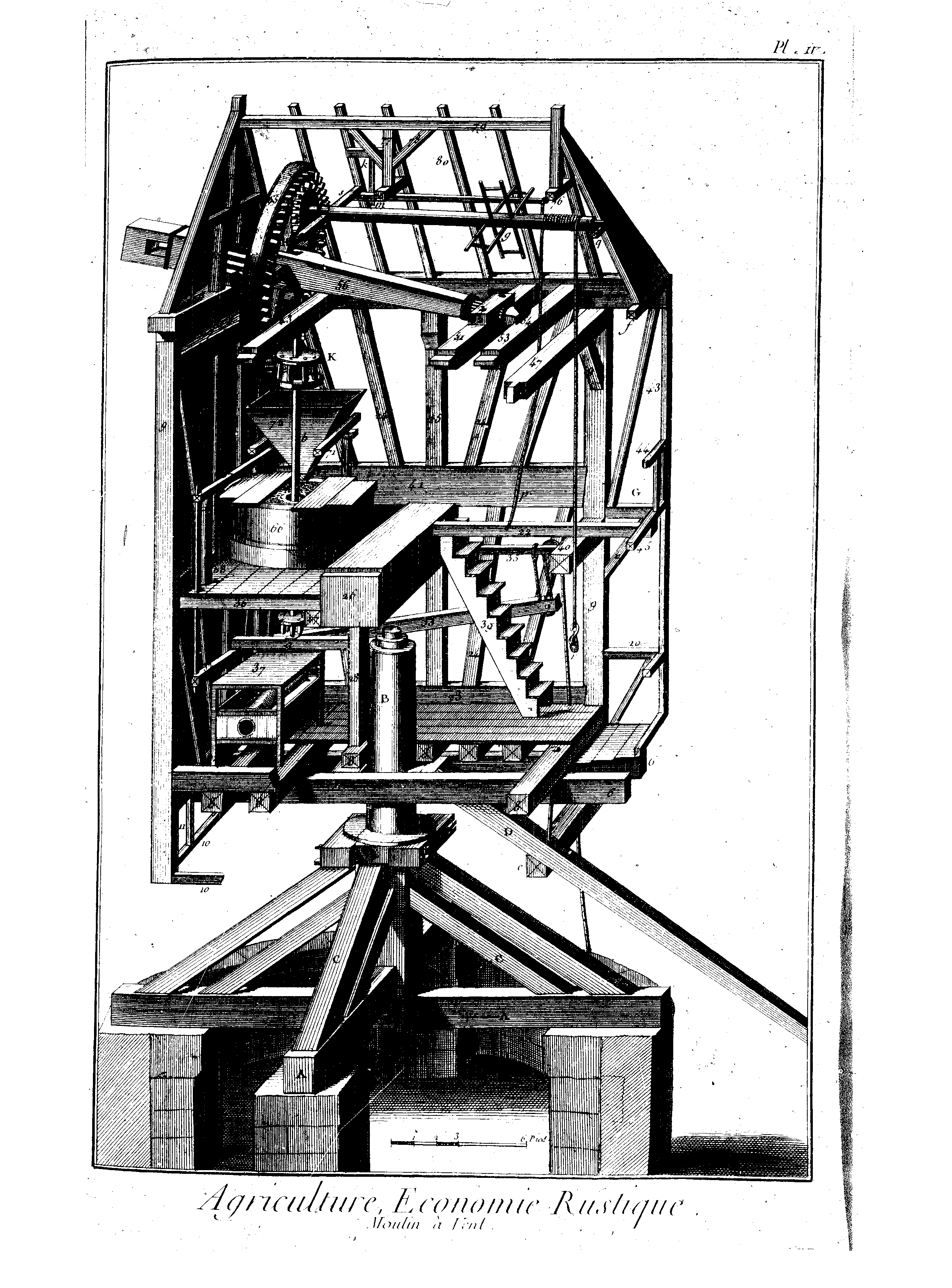
Cross section of a post mill

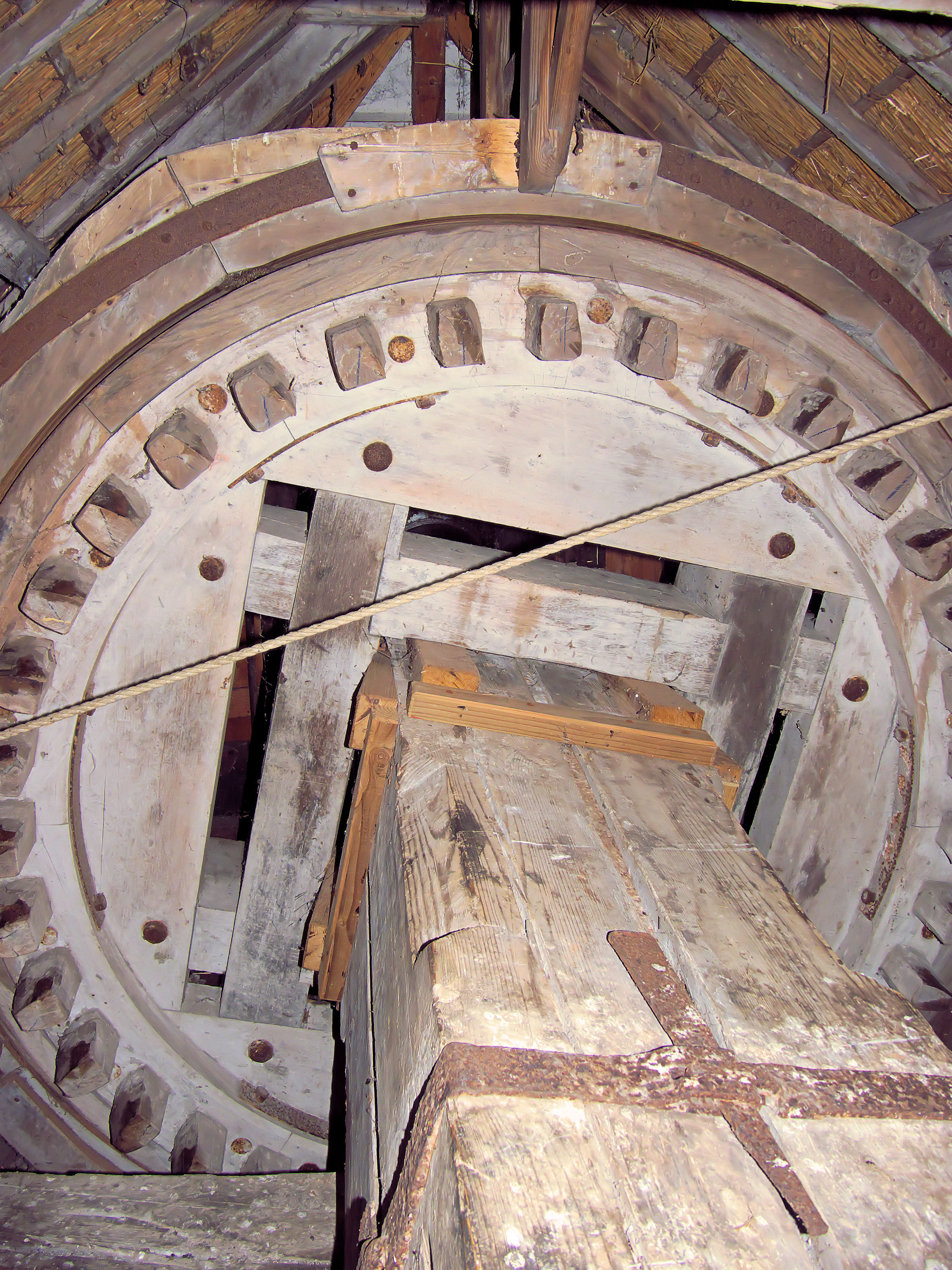
Windshaft, brake wheel, and brake blocks in smock mill d'Admiraal in Amsterdam

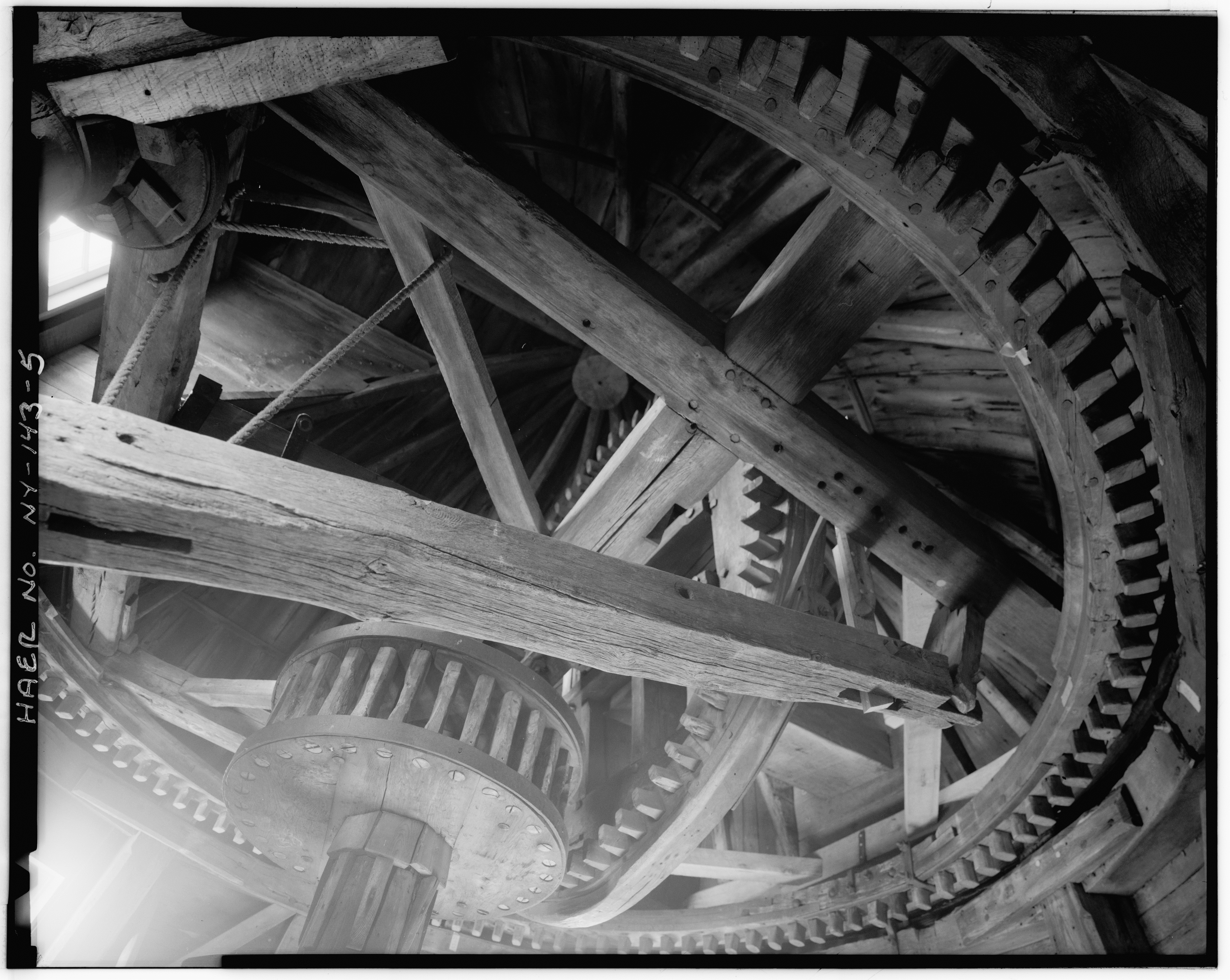
Interior view, Pantigo windmill, East Hampton, New York Historic American Buildings Survey

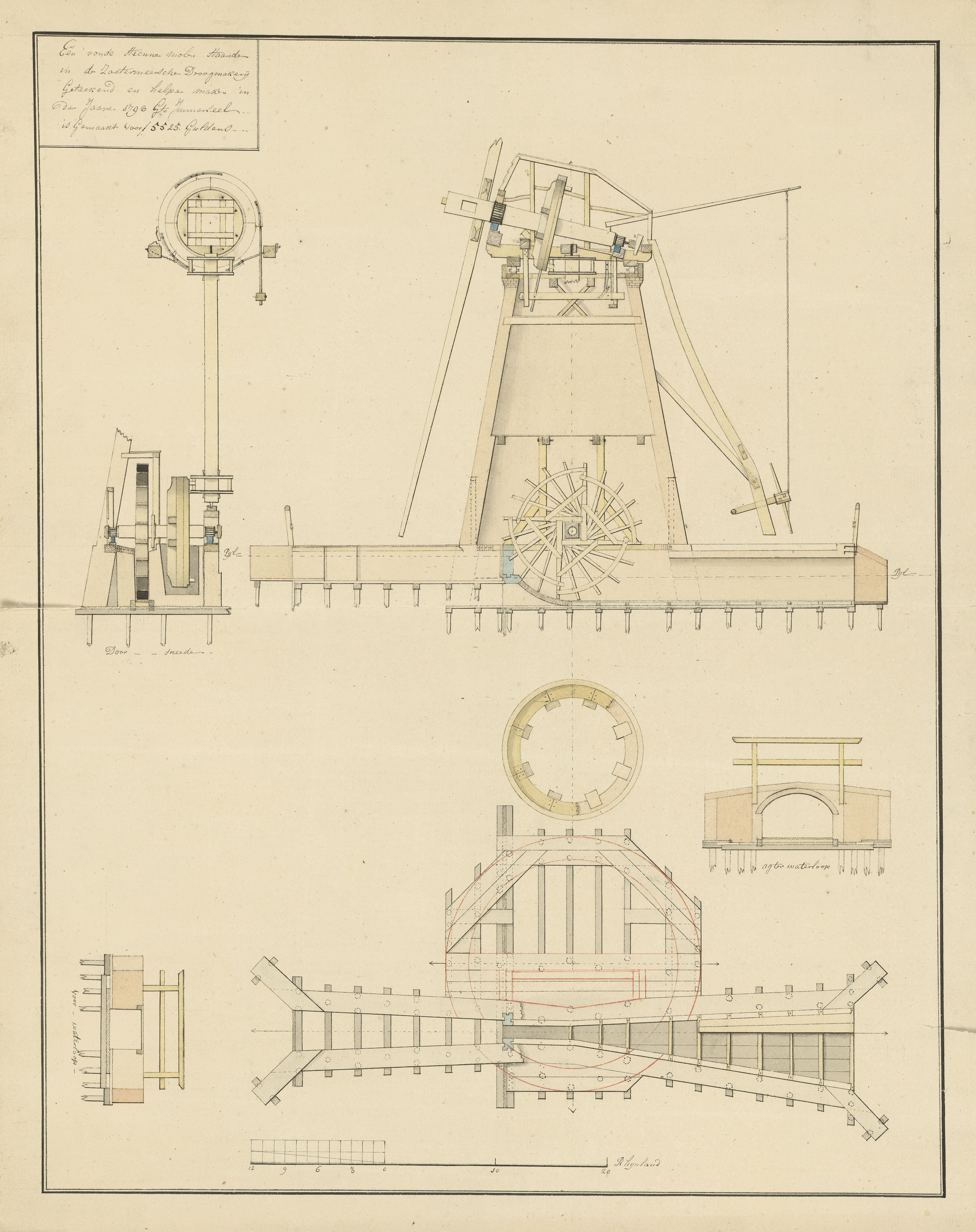
Technical drawing of a 1793 Dutch smock mill for land drainage

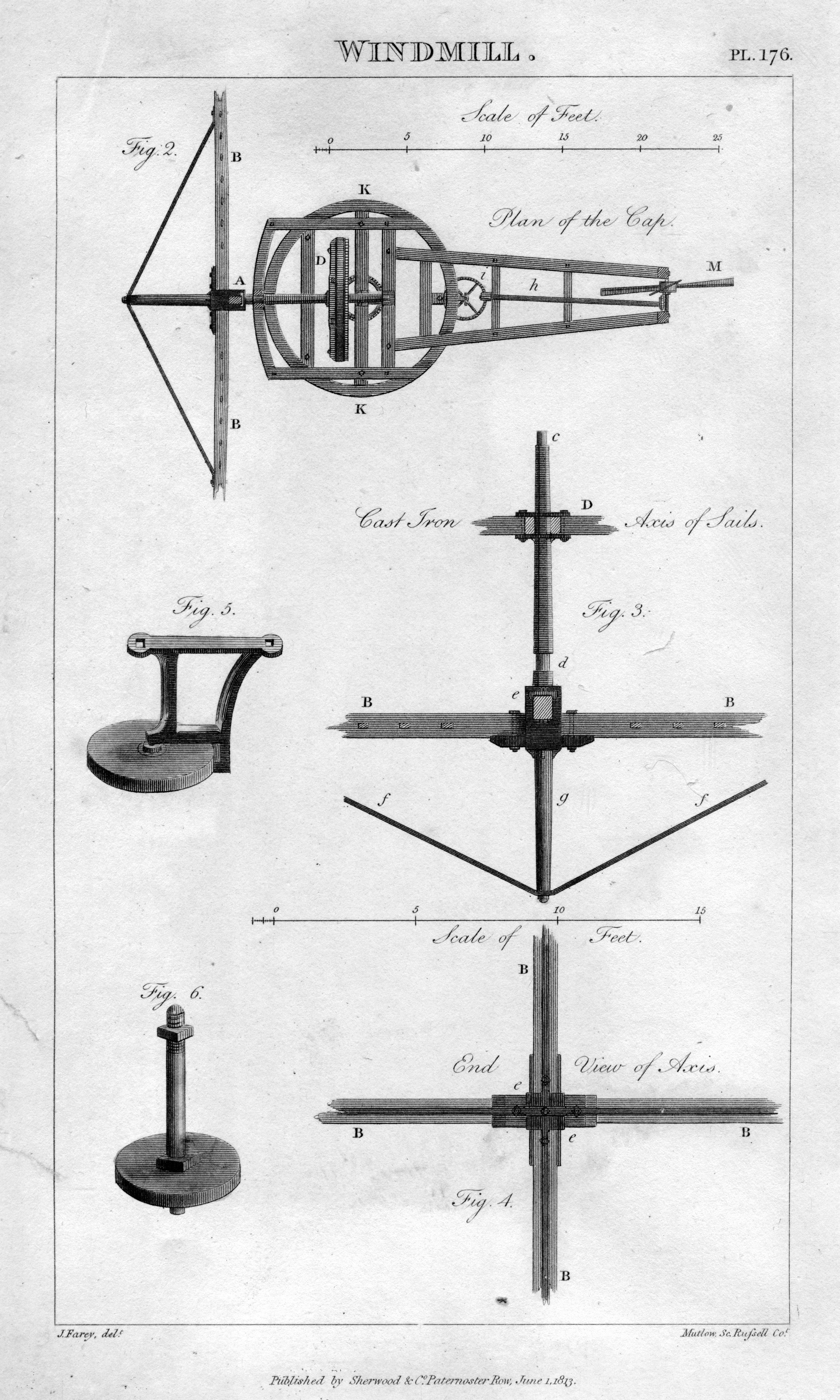
1813 technical drawing

== Spread and decline ==
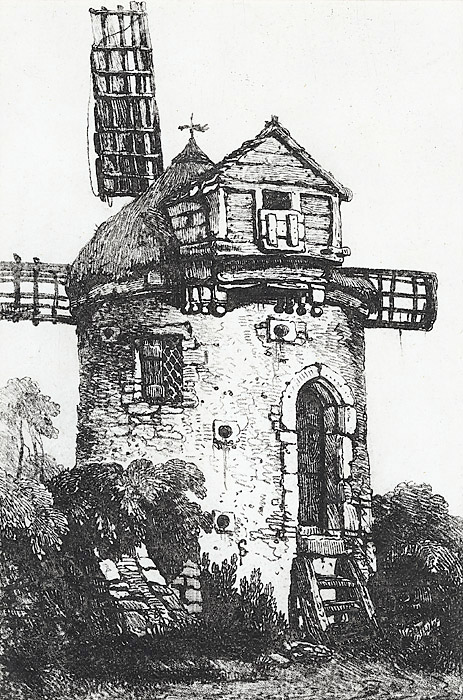
A windmill in Wales, United Kingdom. 1815.

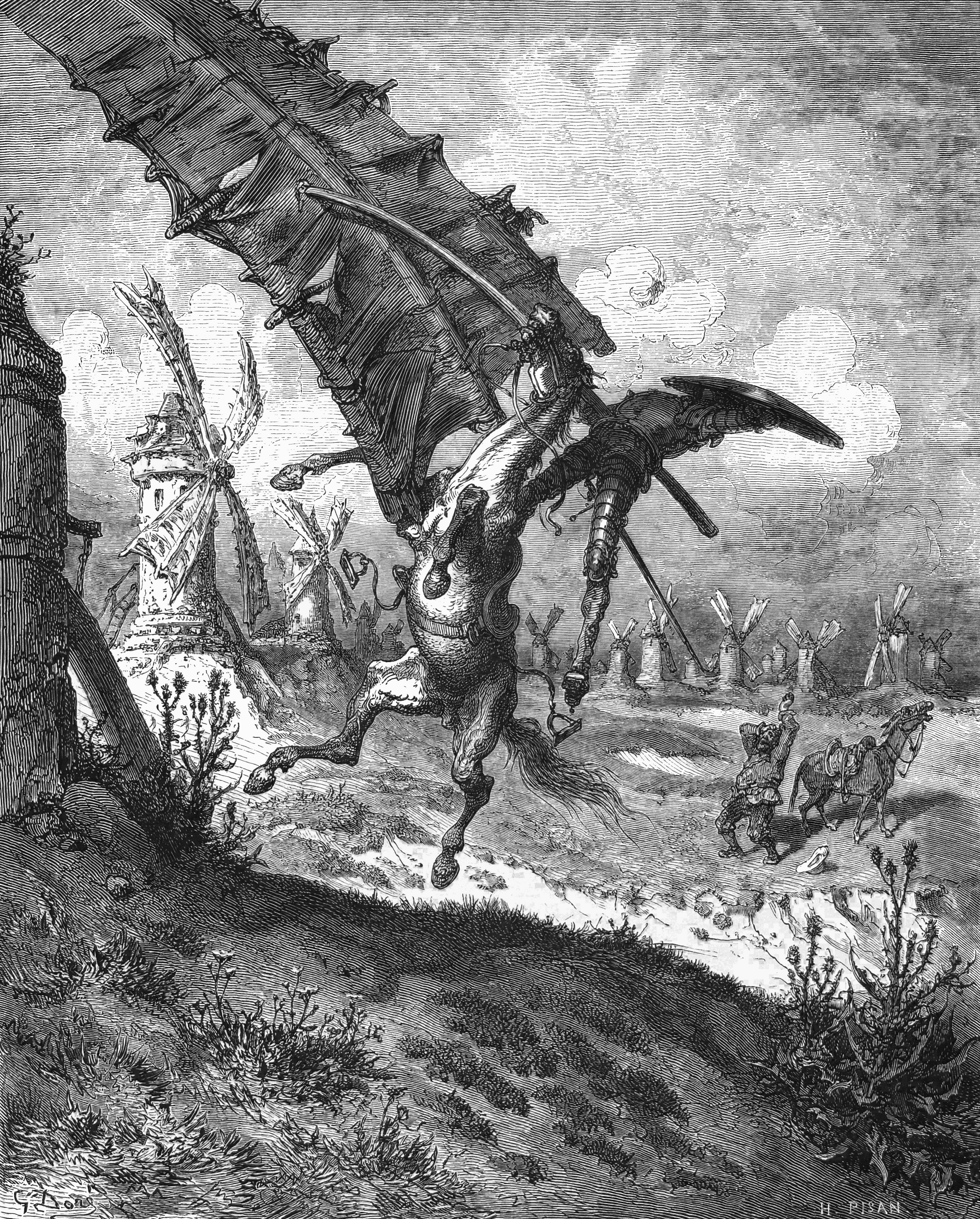
Don Quixote being struck by a windmill (1863 illustration by Gustave Doré)

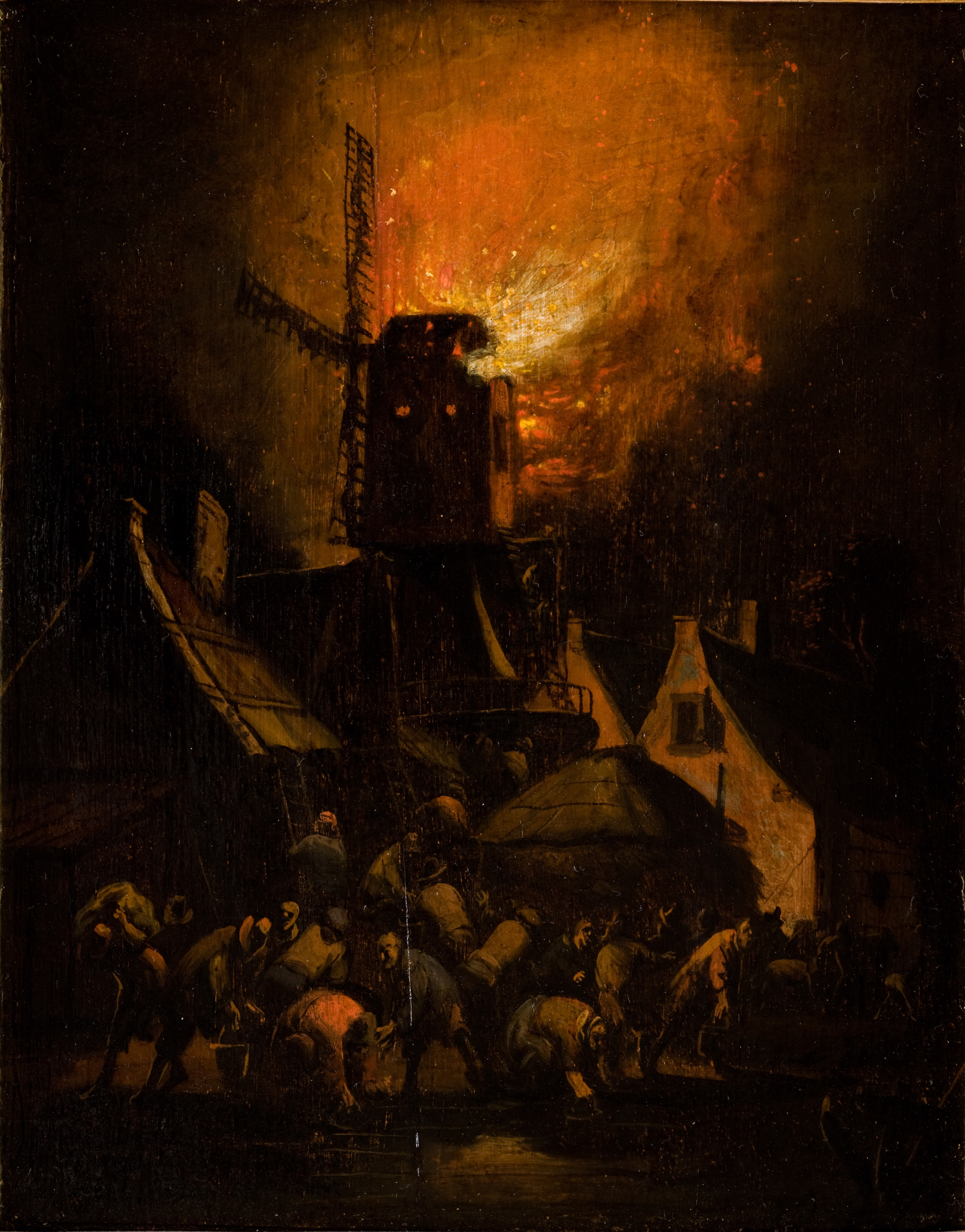
Egbert Lievensz van der Poel, Windmill Fire (17th century), National Museum in Kraków

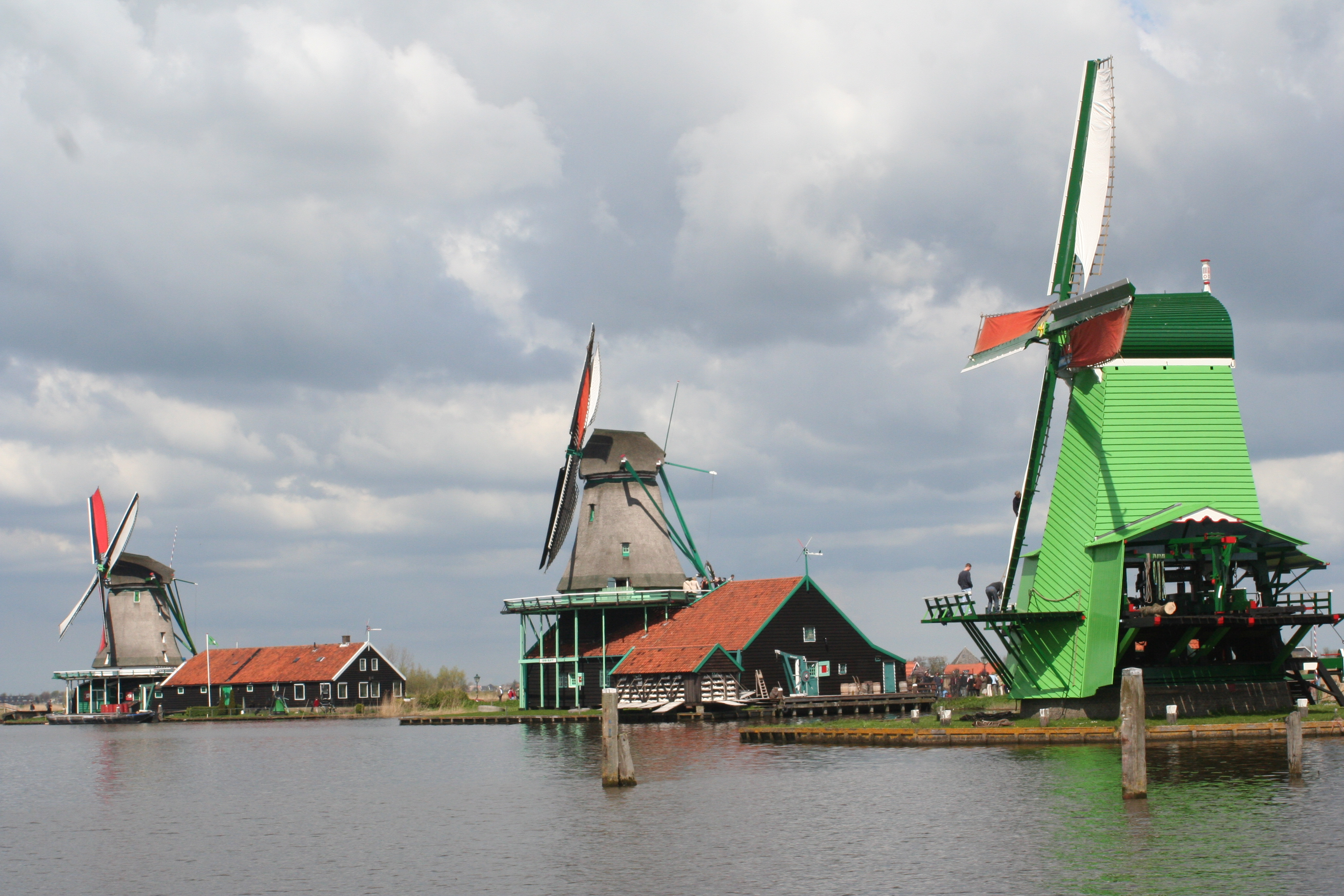
Oilmill De Zoeker, paintmill De Kat and paltrok sawmill De Gekroonde Poelenburg at the Zaanse Schans

In the 14th century, windmills became popular in Europe; the total number of wind-powered mills is estimated to have been around 200,000 at the peak in 1850, which is close to half of the some 500,000 water wheels. Windmills were applied in regions where there was too little water, where rivers freeze in winter and in flat lands where the flow of the river was too slow to provide the required power. With the coming of the Industrial Revolution, the importance of wind and water as primary industrial energy sources declined, and they were eventually replaced by steam (in steam mills) and internal combustion engines, although windmills continued to be built in large numbers until late in the nineteenth century. More recently, windmills have been preserved for their historic value, in some cases as static exhibits when the antique machinery is too fragile to be put in motion, and other cases as fully working mills.

Of the 10,000 windmills in use in the Netherlands around 1850, about 1,000 are still standing. Most of these are being run by volunteers, though some grist mills are still operating commercially. Many of the drainage mills have been appointed as a backup to the modern pumping stations. The Zaan district has been said to have been the first industrialized region of the world with around 600 operating wind-powered industries by the end of the eighteenth century. Economic fluctuations and the industrial revolution had a much greater impact on these industries than on grain and drainage mills, so only very few are left.

Construction of mills spread to the Cape Colony in the seventeenth century. The early tower mills did not survive the gales of the Cape Peninsula, so in 1717 the Heeren XVII sent carpenters, masons, and materials to construct a durable mill. The mill, completed in 1718, became known as the Oude Molen and was located between Pinelands Station and the Black River. Long since demolished, its name lives on as that of a Technical school in Pinelands. By 1863, Cape Town had 11 mills stretching from Paarden Eiland to Mowbray.

== See also ==
- Don Quixote
- Éolienne Bollée
- History of wind power
- Horse mill
- List of windmills
- Mill (heraldry)
- Molinology
- Sustainable energy
- Sustainable living
- Tide mill
- Watermill
- Windmill ship
