= Panemone windmill =

Type of vertical axis wind turbine

A diagram of a panemone whose wind-catching panels are arranged to turn edge-on to the wind when moving against the wind's thrust, and side-on when moving downwind to harness the wind's motion.

A panemone windmill is a type of vertical-axis wind turbine. It has a rotating axis positioned vertically, while the wind-catching blades move parallel to the wind. By contrast, the shaft of a horizontal-axis wind turbine (HAWT) points into the wind while its blades move at right-angles to the wind's thrust. The panemone is a rudimentary and inefficient type of windmill. That is, a panemone primarily uses drag whereas the blades of a HAWT use lift.

Historically the earliest known wind machine was made by the Persians and it was the panemone design, consisting of a wall, with slits, surrounding a vertical axle containing four to eight fabric sails. As the wind blew, the sails would turn the axle, which was in turn connected to grain grinders or some form of water transportation device (though little is known of the actual details of such methods).

== History ==
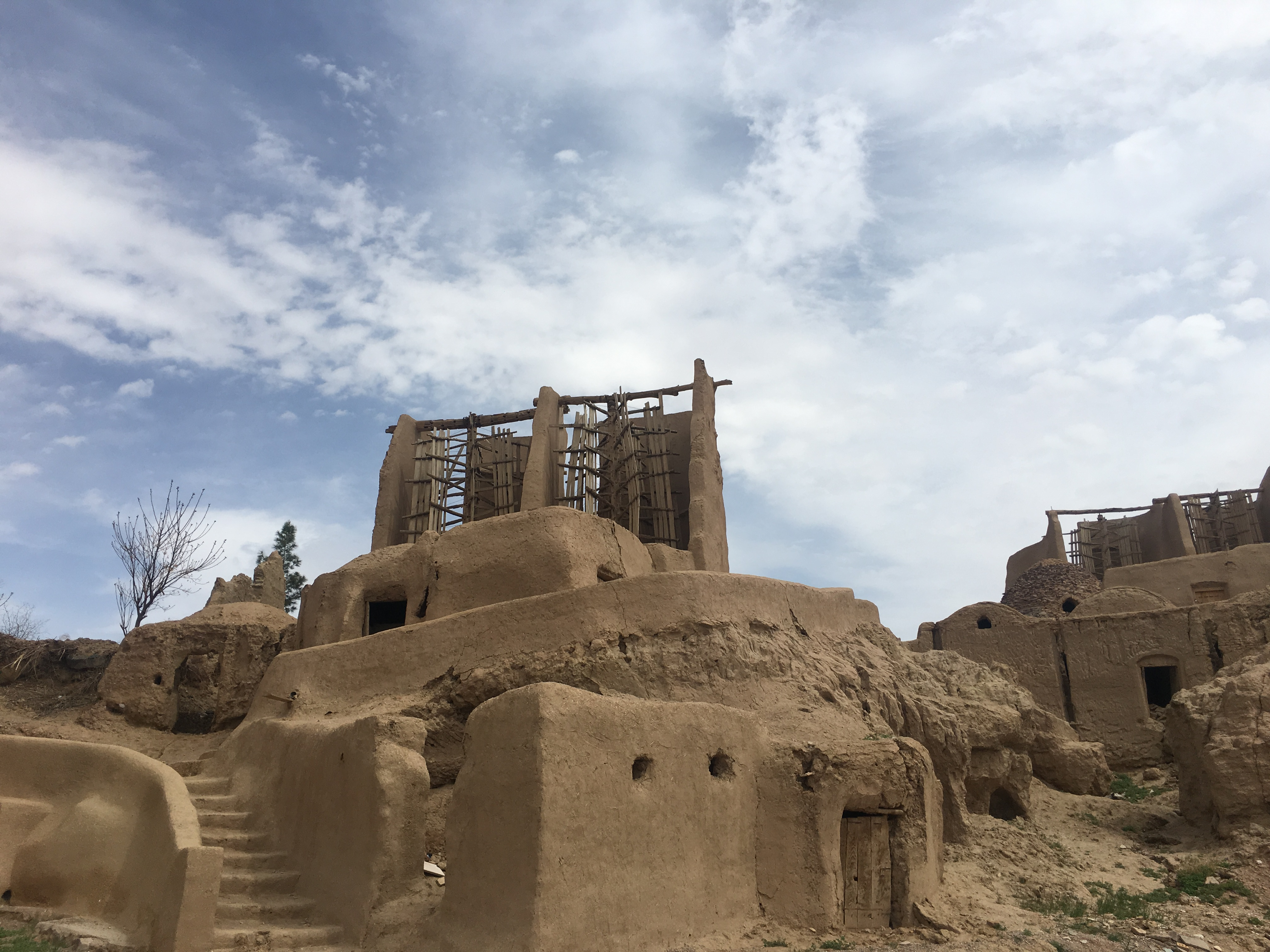
Persian panemones, Sistan, Iran

Diagram of Persian horizontal windmill, the first practical windmill.

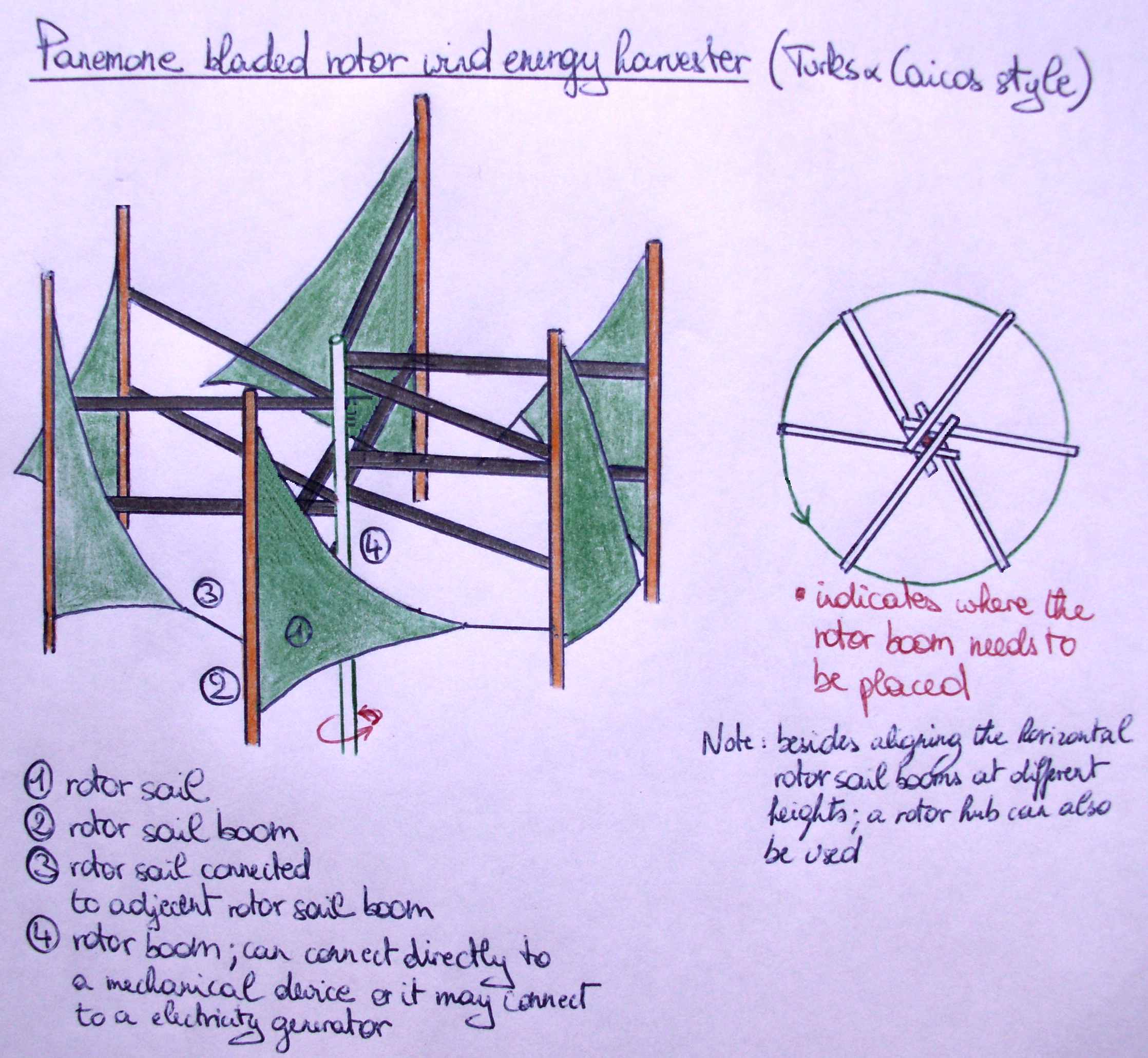
The panemone design used by the Turks & Caicos islanders

The earliest recorded windmill design found was Persian in origin, and was invented sometime around 700–900 AD. This design was the panemone, with vertical lightweight wooden sails attached by horizontal struts to a central vertical shaft. It was first built to pump water, and subsequently modified to grind grain as well. Wind-powered machines may have been known earlier, but there is no clear evidence of windmills prior to the 9th century.

A legendary account of the windmill attributed its invention to Abu Lu'lu'a Firuz. Before becoming a slave to the Rashidun caliph Umar ibn al-Khattab (r. 634–644), Abu Lu'lu'a was said to have designed and built windmills. He brought a complaint to Umar about the high tax charged to him by his master al-Mughira ibn Shu'ba. Umar wrote to al-Mughira and inquired about the tax; al-Mughira's reply was satisfactory, but Umar held that the tax charged from Abu Lu'lu'a was reasonable, owing to his daily income. Umar then is reported to have asked Abu Lu'lu'a to design a windmill for him, to which Abu Lu'lu'a replied, "By God, I will build this [wind]mill of which the World will talk". However, this account may have been a 10th-century amendment. The first clear evidence of vertical-axle windmills are dated to the 9th century, in the Persian region of Sistan (modern Iran and Afghanistan), as described by Muslim geographers. The windmill became widespread across the Islamic world, and later spread to India and China.

== Operation ==
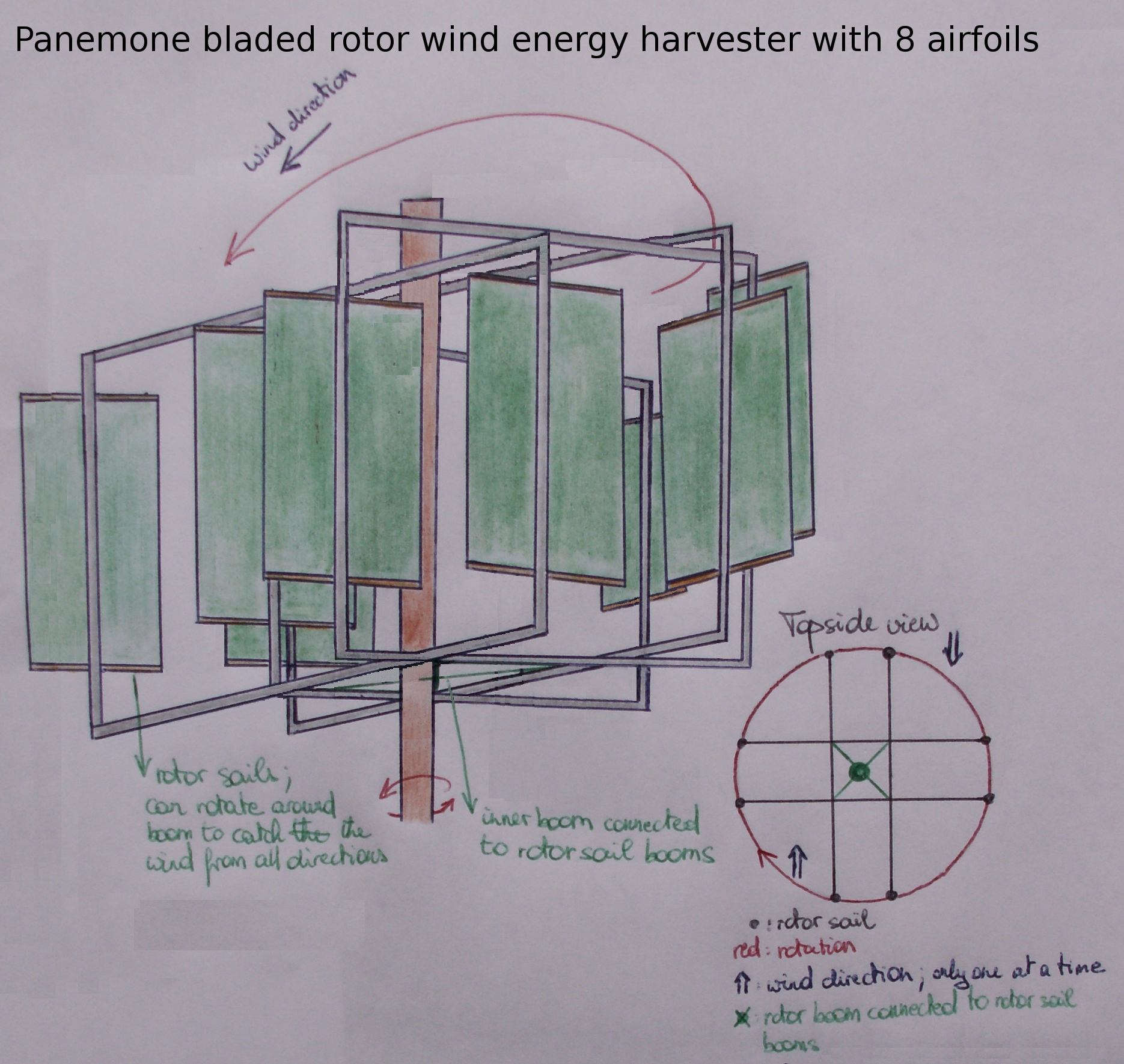
A panemone WEH with 8 airfoils

The vanes of a panemone are moved by the wind in a circle to turn the drive shaft. To accomplish this they must move with the wind only while on one side of the circle, and move against the wind on the other side. To prevent the vanes moving upwind from being blown back by the wind, one half of the panemone may be shielded, or else the vanes may be attached so that they can turn edge-on to the wind when the wheel is moving them upwind.

== Efficiency ==
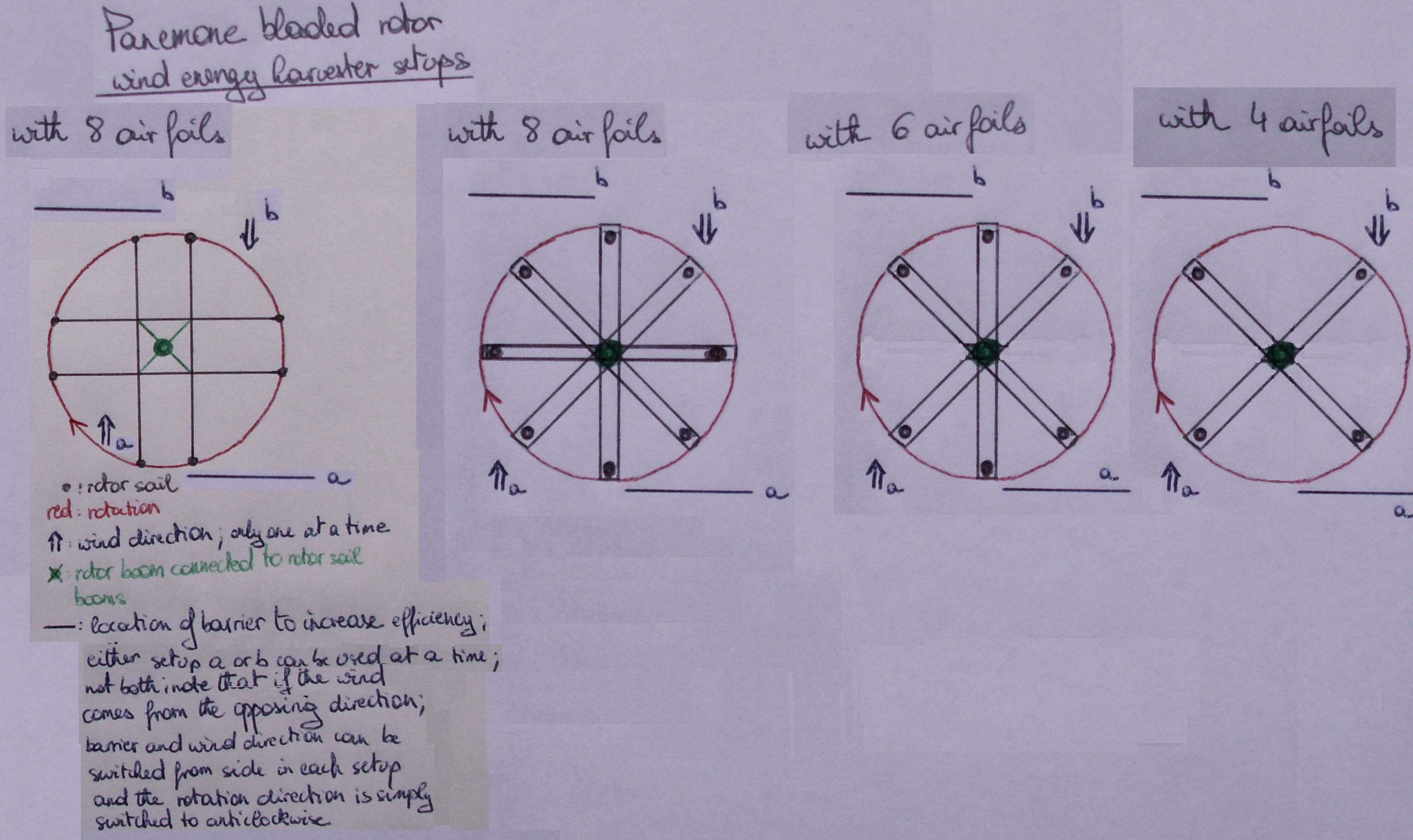
Adding a windbarrier to one side increases efficiency

Wind-harnessing devices which rely on drag reach their maximum efficiency if the collector is pushed away from the wind. Because the wind panels do not work while returning to the upwind side of the device, the rotor in the Persian panemone design can only take energy from wind striking half the collection area (see diagram).

The panemone is one of the least efficient types of wind turbine. Despite this it is also one of the most commonly re-invented and patented forms.

== See also ==
- Small wind turbine
- Wind turbine
