= The International Molinological Society =

The International Molinological Society (TIMS) has been active since 1965 and is the only organization dedicated to mills and molinology on a worldwide scale. It brings together more than six hundred members, mostly from Europe and the USA. TIMS is a non-profit organization with cultural and scientific aims. It was founded in 1973 after earlier international meetings (Symposia) in 1965 and 1969. The original initiative for these meetings was taken by the Portuguese Molinologist Dr. João Miguel dos Santos Simões.

TIMS uses English as its official language.

The society holds regular symposiums every three years or so across Europe. The 2024 symposium was in Portugal, while the 2027 event is planned for Poland.
