= Molinology =

Study of devices which use energy for mechanical purposes

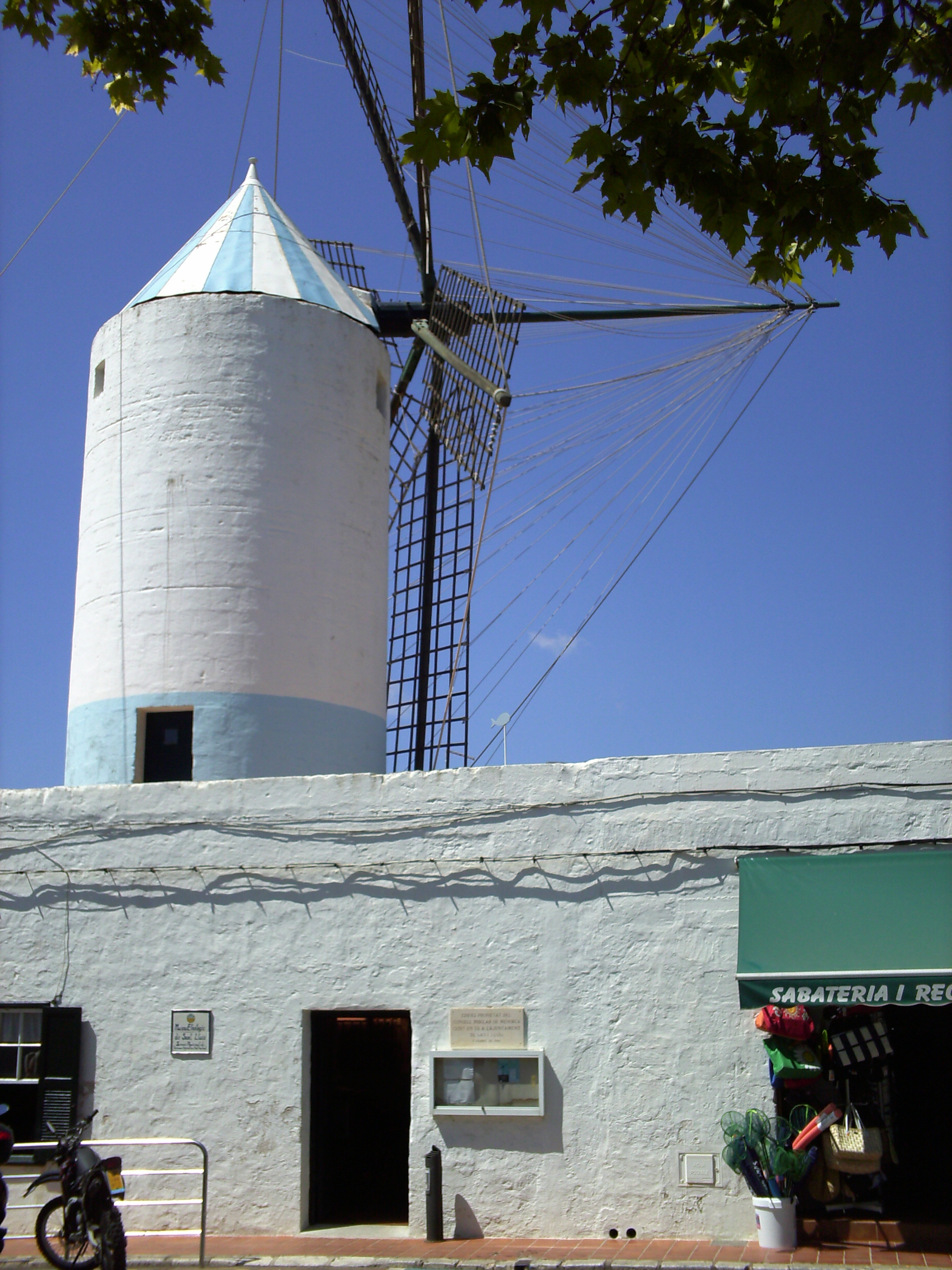
The Molí de Dalt, a former flour mill in Menorca

Molinology (from Latin: molīna, mill; and Greek λόγος, study) is the study of mills and other similar devices which use energy for mechanical purposes such as grinding, fulling or sawing.

== Mill technology ==
The term "Molinology" was coined in 1965 by the Portuguese industrial historian João Miguel dos Santos Simões. Mills make use of moving water or wind, or the strength of animal or human muscle to power machines for purposes such as hammering, grinding, pumping, sawing, pressing or fulling. Since the material resources and technology available to harness mill power have varied across societies and across time, different human societies developed different solutions to the problem. Thus molinology is a multidisciplinary area of study which reaches beyond mechanical analysis of the mills.

Cultural and scientific interest in molinology is maintained by The International Molinological Society (TIMS), a non-profit organisation which brings together around five hundred members worldwide. It was founded in 1973 after earlier international symposia in 1965 and 1969. The society aims to retain the knowledge of those traditional engines which have been rendered obsolete by modern technical and economic trends.

== See also ==
- Watermill – Structure that uses a water wheel or turbine
- Tide mill – Type of watermill
- Windmill – Machine that makes use of wind energy
- Horse mill – Type of mill powered by horses
- Ship mill – Watermill on a floating platform
- Treadmill – Exercise machine
- Treadwheel – Form of engine typically powered by humans
