= St Joseph's Roman Catholic Church, Hay-on-Wye =

Roman Catholic church in Wales

St. Joseph's Roman Catholic Church
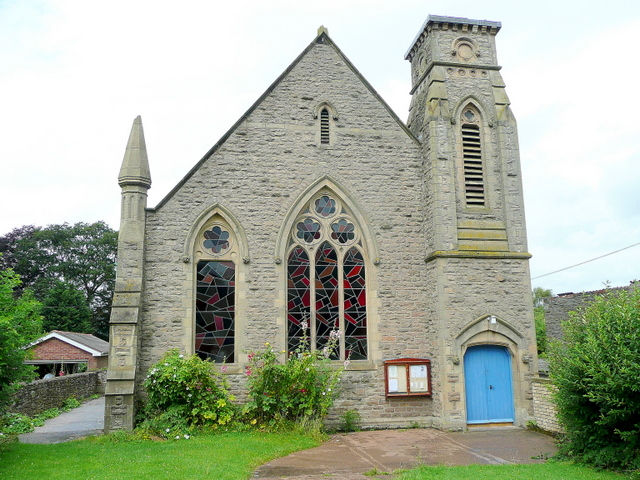
- Church viewed from Belmont Rd
- St. Joseph's Roman Catholic Church
- 52.074774°N 3.127053°W
- Address: The Presbytery, 4 Belmont Road, Hay-on-Wye, Powys HR3 5DA
- Country: Wales
- Denomination: Roman Catholic
- Previous denomination: Calvinistic Methodist
- Website: "St. Joseph's website".

History
- Former name: Tabernacle Calvinistic Methodist Chapel
- Founded: Chapel built 1828 and extended 1872. RC repurposed 1967.
- Dedication: Saint Joseph
- Consecrated: May 28th 1967 - Feast of the Ascension
- Events: Mass: Sunday at 9am and Thursday at 10am. For other liturgical events, see newsletter.

Architecture
- Heritage designation: Hay Conservation Area
- Architect(s): Richard Owens (1872), F.R. Bates, Son & Price of Newport (1967)
- Style: Gothic architecture

Administration
- Province: Cardiff-Menevia, Wrexham and Herefordshire see "Directory and Yearbook".
- Archdiocese: Cardiff-Menevia see "website".
- Deanery: St. John Lloyd

Clergy
- Priest: Fr. Jimmy Sebastian Pulickakunnel MCBS see contact details in newsletter on noticeboard outside church or "online".

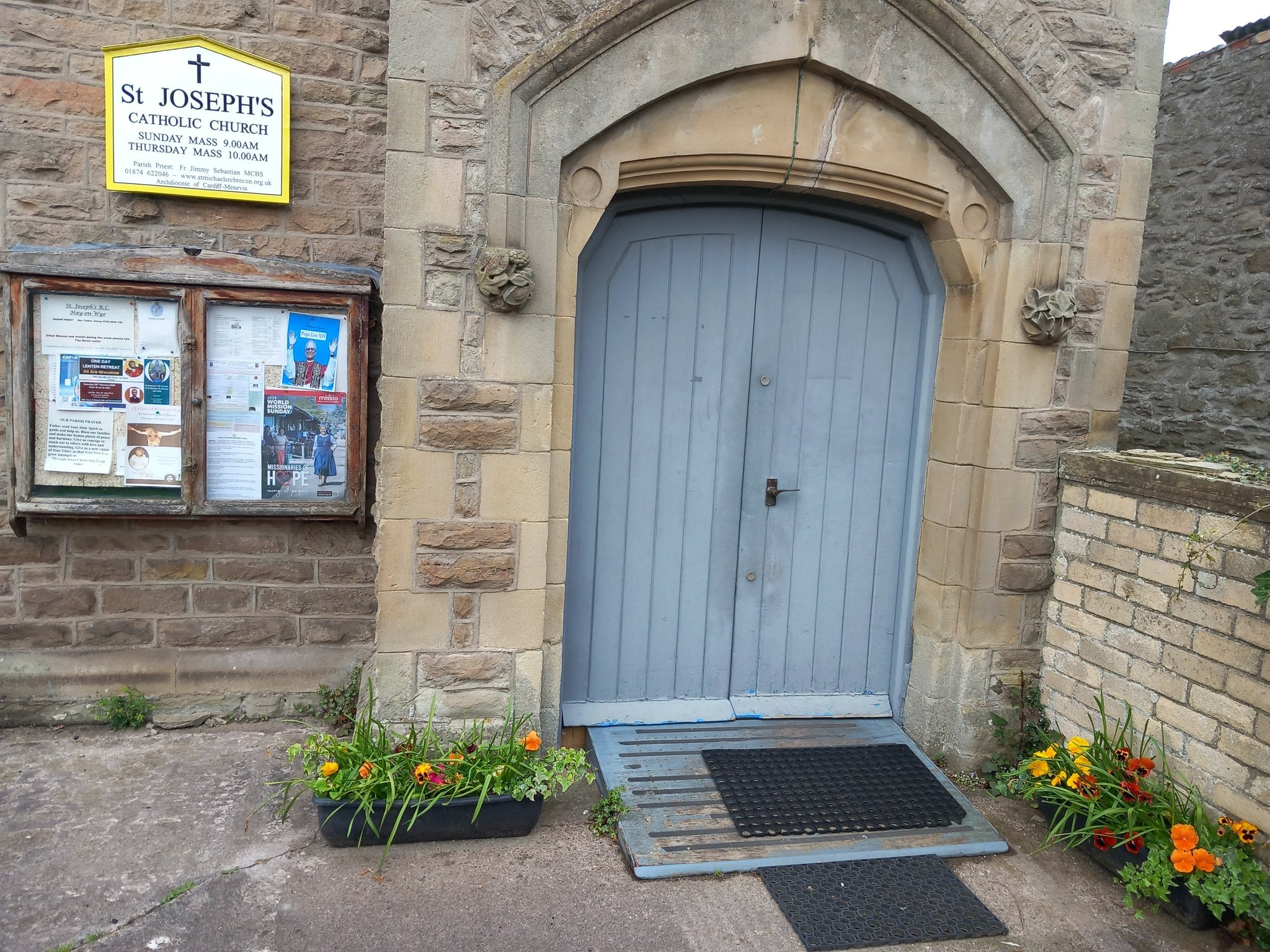
St. Joseph's entrance

St. Joseph's Church is a Roman Catholic Church in Belmont Road in Hay-on-Wye, Powys, Wales.

St. Joseph's is served out of St. Michael's Roman Catholic Church in Brecon. The parish priest for both parishes is Fr. Jimmy Sebastian Pulickakunnel MCBS, a member of the religious order of the Missionary Congregation of the Blessed Sacrament.

Monsignor Canon Clyde Hughes Johnson, now retired, still helps in St. Joseph's Parish and has done so for decades.

== St. Joseph's R.C. Parish - Hay-on-Wye ==
There are two regular masses, Sunday at 9am and Thursday at 10am. The weekly newsletter contains details about social and liturgical events including the Sacrament of Reconciliation, Exposition, and Holy day masses.

Parishioners play an active part in the life of the parish. The Parish Advisory Council (PAC) includes parishioners with responsibilities for safeguarding, finances, gardening, maintenance and repair.

Lay ministries include altar serving, catechist (including RCIA), reader, eucharistic minister, liturgical animation and hospitality. Periodic activities include preparation of bidding prayers, church and altar linen cleaning, and flower arranging.

The site on Belmont Rd was used as a Methodist chapel for about 130 years. It was purchased in 1967 and adapted for use as a Roman Catholic church.

== Roman Catholic Province of Cardiff-Menevia, Wrexham and Herefordshire ==
Geographically, the province covers all of Wales and the county of Herefordshire in England. Administratively, the province consists of the Diocese of Wrexham and the Archdiocese of Cardiff-Menevia (which includes Herefordshire). The archdiocese was created in 2024 by merging the Archdiocese of Cardiff and the Diocese of Menevia.

The new archdiocese is subdivided into seven deaneries. St. Joseph's (Hay-on-Wye) and St. Michael's (Brecon) are in the St. John Lloyd Deanery. Other churches in the deanery include Cathedral, St. David's/Danygraig, Townhill, Sketty, Gendros/Landore, Dunvant, Mumbles, Morriston Port Talbot/Cwmavon, Margam, Sandfields, Briton Ferry, and Neath/Glyneath.

The Roman Catholic Church in Wales is a full member of Cytûn: Churches Together in Wales an ecumenical group of churches in Wales.

== Location ==
Hay-on-Wye is a medieval town on the border of England and Wales in the area known as the Welsh Marches.

Due to Richard Booth, the town is widely known as the "town of books". On April Fools' Day in 1977, Booth proclaimed Hay-on-Wye as an "independent kingdom". He declared himself as "King" and his horse as "Prime Minister".

The town hosts the annual Hay Festival of Literature & Arts. Literary connections to St. Joseph's include Penelope Betjeman, Christopher Dawson, Bridget Gubbins, Evelyn Waugh, and H.G. Wells.

Francis Kilvert is a literary connection for the geographical area known as "Kilvert country" which includes Hay-on-Wye and nearby villages, especially Clyro, Cusop and Llanigon.

== Tabernacle Calvinistic Methodist Chapel, Hay-on-Wye (1828 - about 1963) ==
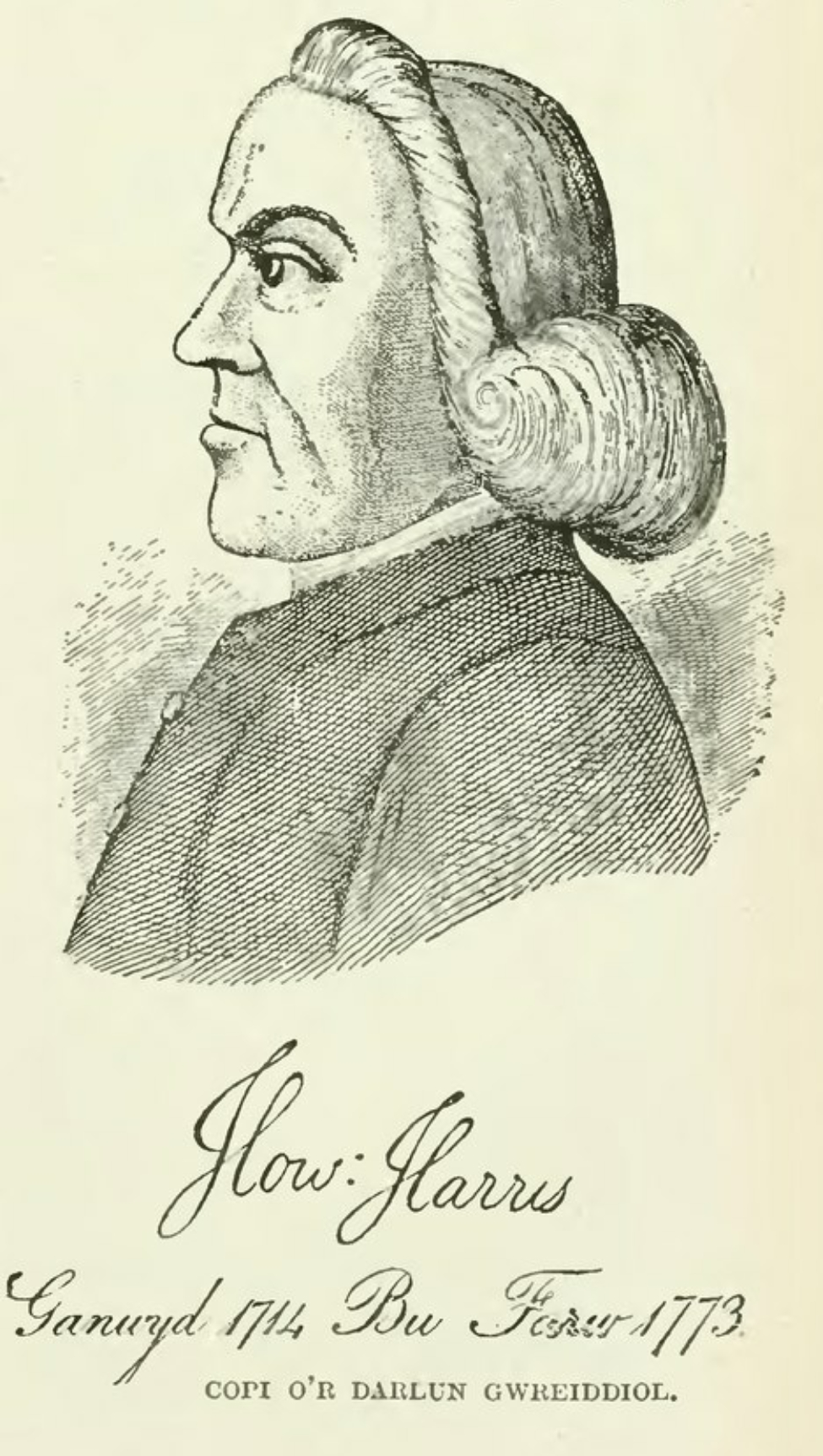
Mr Howell Harris (1773)

Howell Harris from Talgarth (near Hay-on-Wye) played a key role in the Welsh Methodist revival and the establishment of the Calvinistic Methodist denomination (now the Presbyterian Church of Wales). They are the only Christian denomination indigenous to Wales. Services are predominantly in Welsh. In 1811, the Calvinistic Methodist denomination separated from the Church of England (facilitating the ordination of their own ministers). In 1823, they seceded from the Wesleyan Methodist denomination. The Welsh Presbyterian Church in Wales has subtle and distinct differences with other Presbyterian churches in the UK.

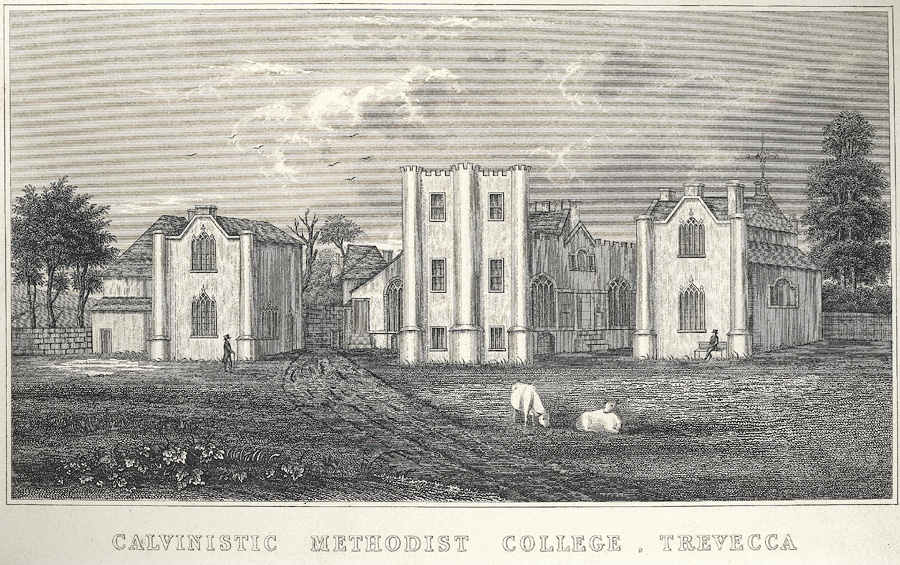
Coleg Trefeca near Tagarth (1860)

In 1740, William Seward, an itinerant lay preacher from Coleg Trefeca (the Calvinistic Methodist theological college near Talgarth), and other outsiders visited Hay-on-Wye to promote their theology. Allegedly a stone thrown from a hostile crowd in Black Lion Green resulted in Seward receiving head injuries. He died a few days later, and he is widely known as the first Methodist martyr. The historicity of the Black Lion Green incident is disputed by some for various reasons, including the lack of contemporary evidence. Archdeacon Rev. Dr W. L. Bevan (Vicar of St. Mary's, 1845–1901), an authority on the history of the Welsh Church, said that the "highly coloured account of the martyr's death on the tombstone in Cusop churchyard is dated at least 100 years after Seward's death". The event may have been a conflation of similar well documented incidents endured by Seward and other itinerant preachers.

Some Methodist congregations were nicknamed "the Jumpers". In 1774, John Wesley preached in St. John's Chapel in Lion Street. He described "the Jumpers": "they clapped their hands with the utmost violence; they shook their heads; they distorted all their features; they threw their arms and legs to and fro in all variety of postures; they sang, roared, shouted, screamed with all their might to the no small terror of those that were near them".

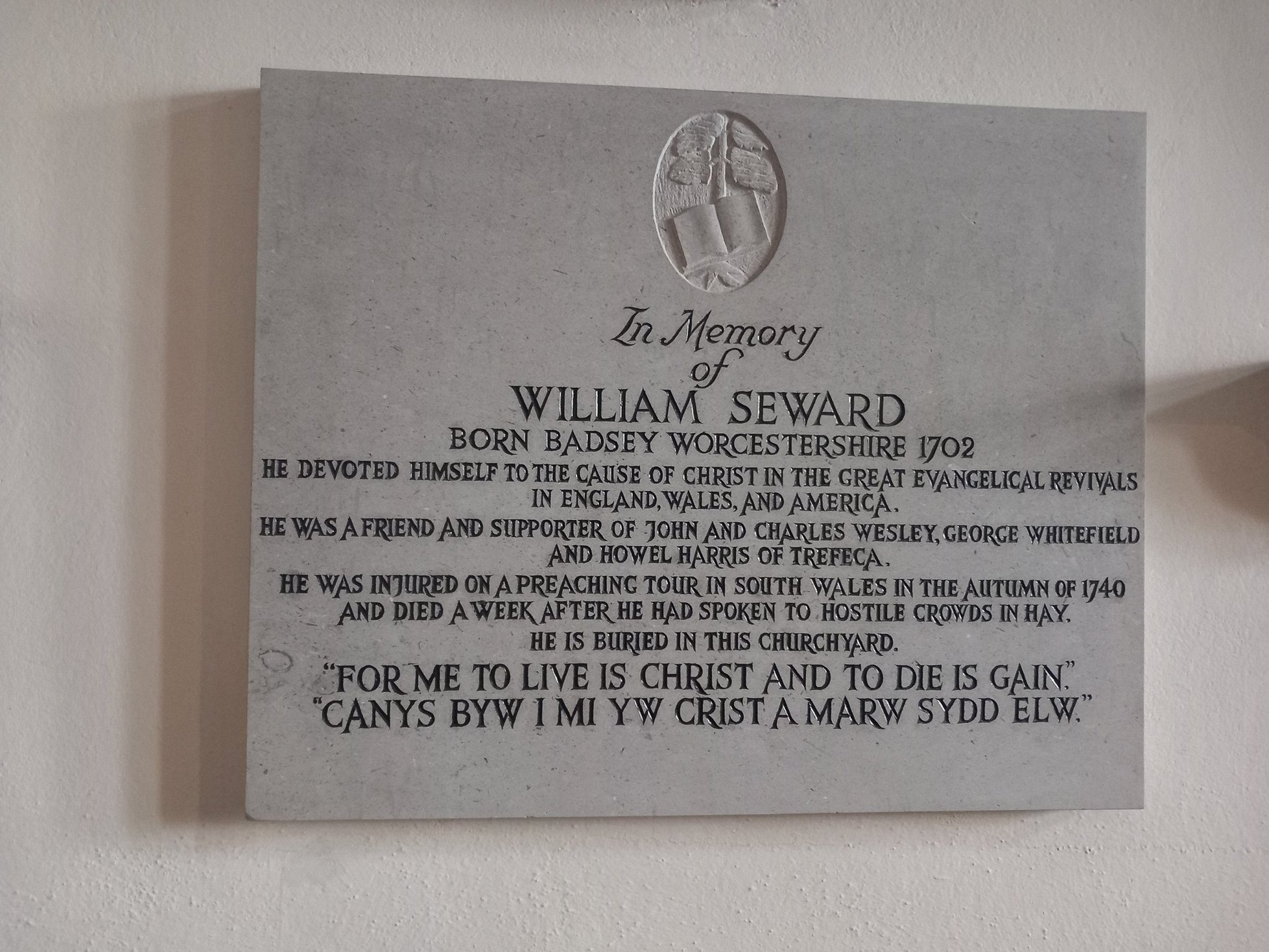
Mr William Seward Memorial, St. Marys, Cusop

In 1828, the Tabernacle Calvinistic Methodist Chapel was built in Belmont Road. The word "tabernacle" emphasises the presence of God and the practice of Holy Communion. The building of the new chapel was overseen by its minister, Rev. Dr. Thomas Phillips (1803–70), who lived in Castle Street on a stipend of £30 per annum. His previous ministry was to train clergy for the South Wales Home Missionary Society (in Neuadd-lwyd). Their missionary work targeted the anglicised areas in Wales, like Hay-on-Wye. It is not known if Tabernacle Chapel services were conducted in Welsh or English or both. Phillips facilitated the growth of the Tabernacle Chapel congregation, assisted by the absence of a Sunday evening service at nearby St. Mary's (then Anglican, but Church in Wales since 1920). Methodists often attended Anglican services as well as their own. Tabernacle Chapel services were at 11am, 2pm and 6pm on Sunday and 7pm on Monday. For many years "everyone in Wales went to Church or Chapel, three times on a Sunday and often during the week". A typical Sunday included "two full services and Sunday School sandwiched between them in the afternoon".

In 1834, Samuel Lewis described the Tabernacle Chapel as a "handsome place of worship". Phillips "kept a school". Pigot's Directory of 1830 states he was headmaster of the school in Heol‑y‑dŵr. Lewis commends the Methodist Chapel teachers for freely teaching local children. In 1836, after a decade at the Tabernacle Chapel, Phillips left to become the "indefatigable and marvellously successful" Welsh secretary of the ecumenical British and Foreign Bible Society in Hereford.

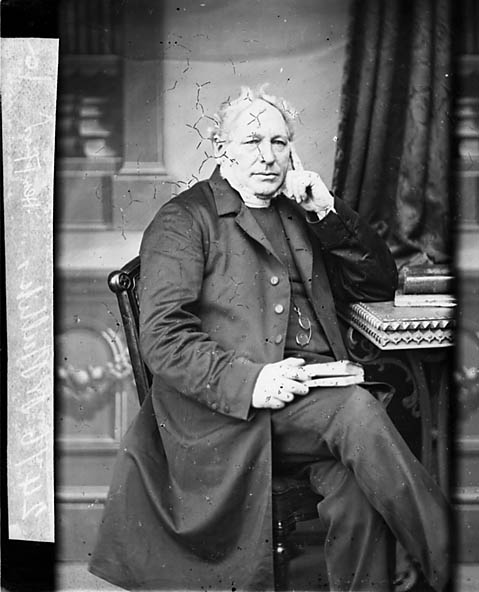
Rev. Thomas Phillips (1865)

Up to 1845, Welsh Calvinistic Methodists frequently used an itinerant or shared preaching system. A minister rarely served a single Chapel, instead, they were assigned to a broader circuit (known as a gofalaeth i.e. a group of Chapels). It was common for ministers not to depend entirely on a single small congregation for their livelihood. Many also worked as teachers, farmers etc. which often caused them to move frequently between border towns like Hay-on-Wye, Brecon, and Talgarth. The small congregation had to augment the meagre stipends given to ministers. It is likely that the Chapel adopted the practice of pew renting to generate income, thus most of the congregation stood throughout the services. The practice of pew renting was abolished from all churches and chapels by the mid-20th century, which would have had a negative impact on the financial viability of the Chapel.

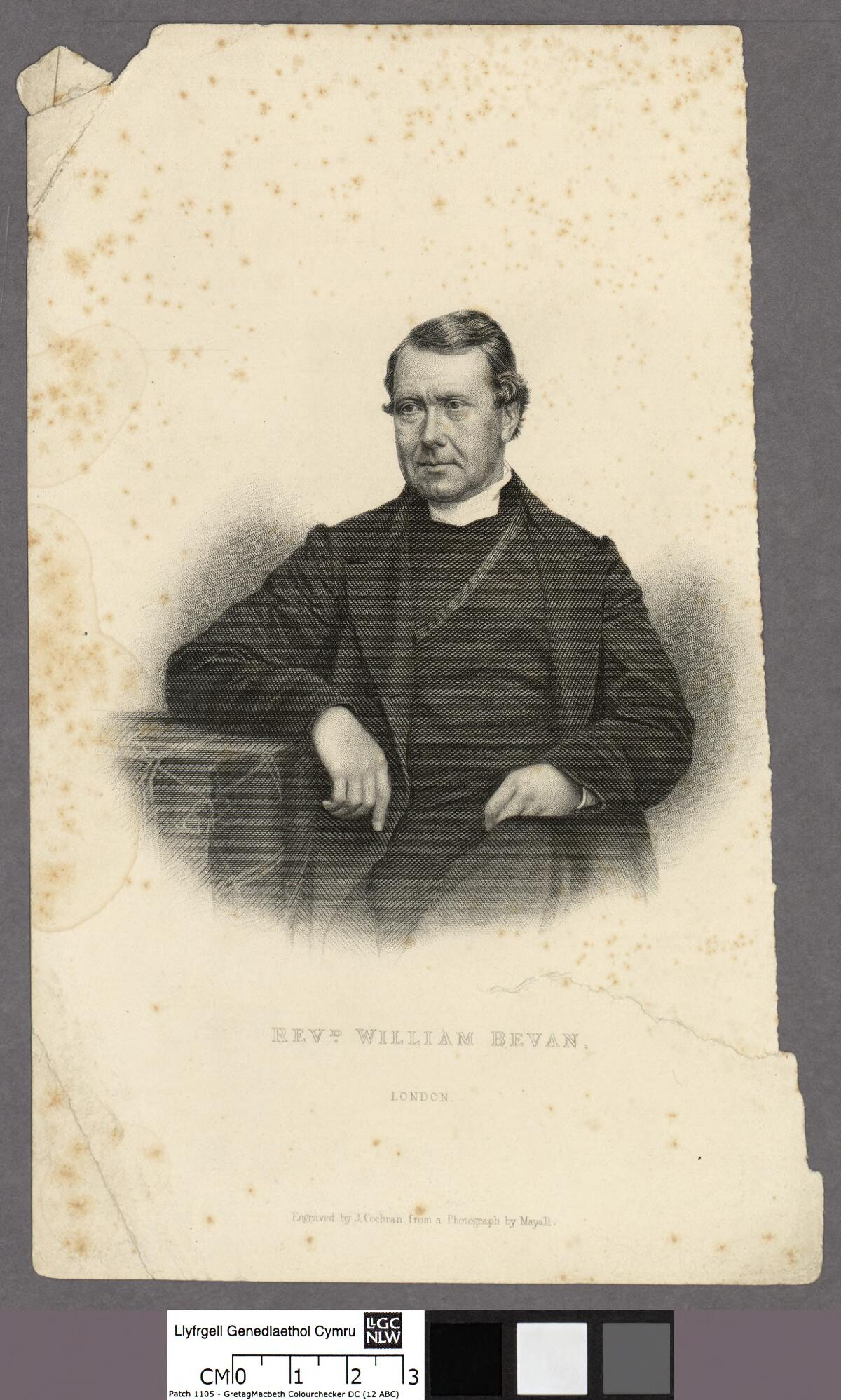
Rev. William L. Bevan (1840)

Following Phillips departure there was a high-turnover of clergy between 1838 and 1875: Reverends Rees Harvard, William Evans, Owen Howell (1849), Evan William, Thomas Rees (1855), Moses Williams (1857), James Roberts, Thomas Hughes and Evan Williams. Clergy absences were covered by the students from Treveca (1858-1887). In 1877 without a minister in charge, William Powell a lay person and resident of Hay took charge intermittently (1877, 1887, 1889).

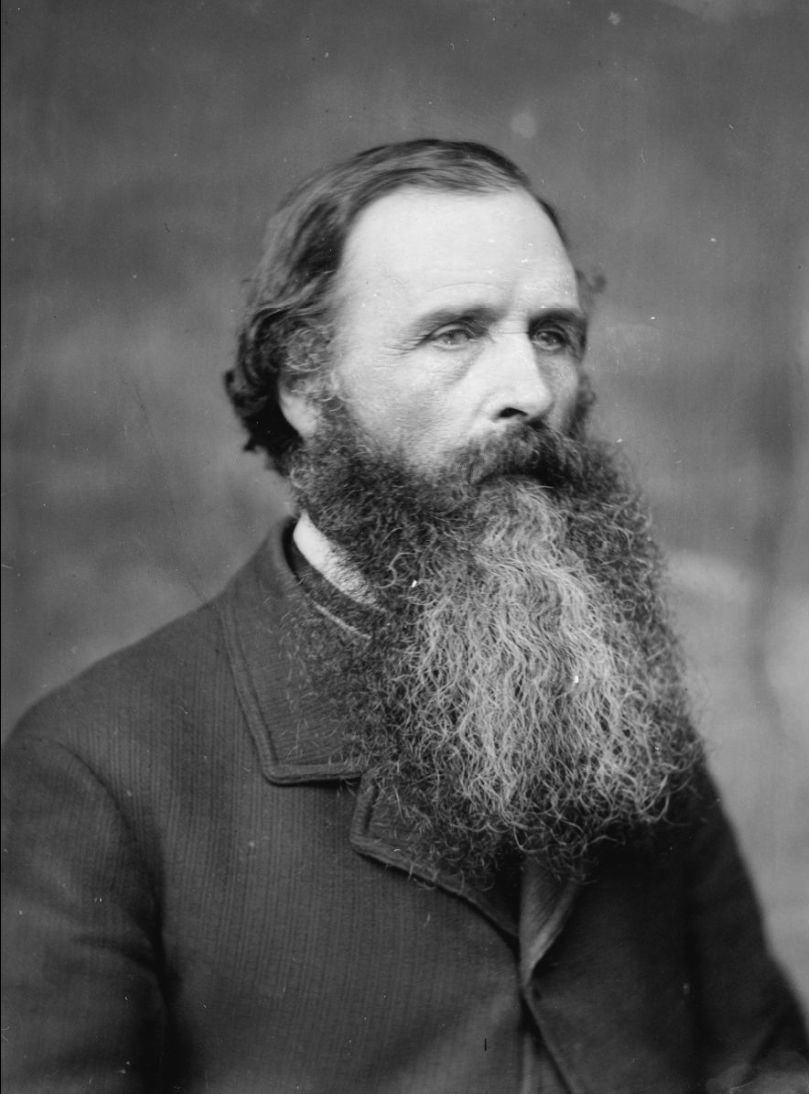
Mr Richard Owens (1875)

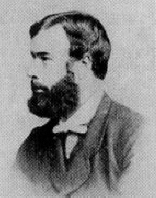
Rev. Francis Kilvert (1870)

Between 1865 and 1872, whilst curate for Saint Michael and All Angels in Clyro, Francis Kilvert often visited Llanthomas (in Llanigon) and his friend Rev. Dr W. L. Bevan who lived in Hay Castle. Kilvert would have walked past the Tabernacle Chapel. Given his attention to detail in the surviving Kilvert diaries it might appear surprising that the Tabernacle Chapel (and the six other non-conformist chapels in Hay-on-Wye) are not mentioned. However, as a loyal Anglican, Kilvert had little time for non-conformists, whom he called dissenters.

At the end of the 19th century, of the 6,427 known non-conformist chapels in Wales, more than half had been rebuilt at least once. In 1872, a new stone-built chapel was partly built on the foundations of the original Tabernacle Chapel, retaining portions of the original walls. It cost £700 to build, worth about £100,000 today. The chapel was designed by the prolific Calvinistic Methodist architect Richard Owens of Liverpool. The building contractor was James Webb of Hay-on-Wye. Rev. Richmond Leigh Roose oversaw the building of the upgraded Tabernacle Chapel. He was the father of the Wales international footballer Leigh Richmond, who died in the 1916 Somme offensive. Leigh is commemorated at the Thiepval memorial in France. The successor to Rev. R. L. Roose as minister for the Tabernacle Chapel was Rev. B. Lewis.

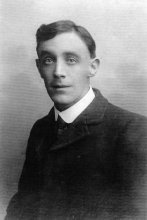
Rev. Rhys Prytherch (about 1914)

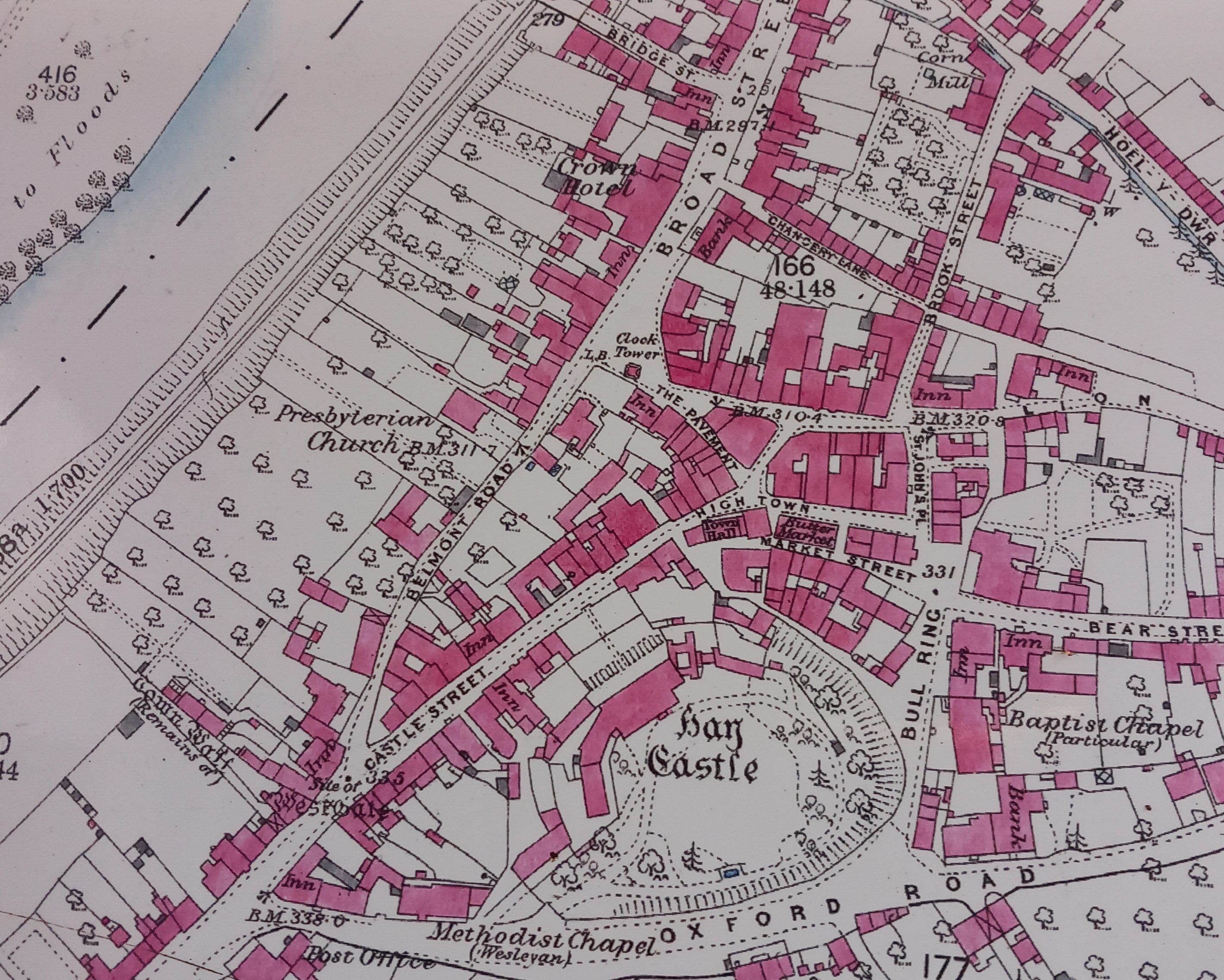
Hay-on-Wye Map 1889 (displayed at the Cheese Market)

The Calvinistic Methodist Minister Rev. Rhys Thomas Pryddererch (or Prytherch) was a respected preacher in the Hay-on-Wye area. He volunteered for the infantry in 1914 but was rejected on medical grounds. He declined the role of chaplain, not wanting officer privileges. He wanted to serve alongside the foot soldiers, living testimony to "the first will be last...". On his fifth application he was accepted as a private. He died within 10 days of arriving on the Western front. He is commemorated on the Hay-on-Wye and Cusop War Memorial.

The eventual reduction in the Tabernacle Chapel congregation size may be due to the small number of Welsh speakers in Hay-on-Wye and/or the nuanced theological differences with the nearby English speaking chapels: Trinity Wesleyan Methodist (Oxford Road), Bethesda Primitive Methodist (Oxford Road), Ebenezer Independent Methodist (Broad Street), Salem Baptist (Bell Bank), Quakers (Bridge Street) and the Salvation Army (Lion Street). Emigration to the United States by non-conformists seeking greater religious freedom was another factor, at one time 30 Tabernacle members emigrated to the United States. The Tabernacle Chapel closed sometime in the 1960s. The last known dated document is a 1963 list of preachers who were qualified and available to lead services when the regular minister was unavailable.

== St. Joseph's Parish and Church, Hay-on-Wye (1892 - 1926) ==
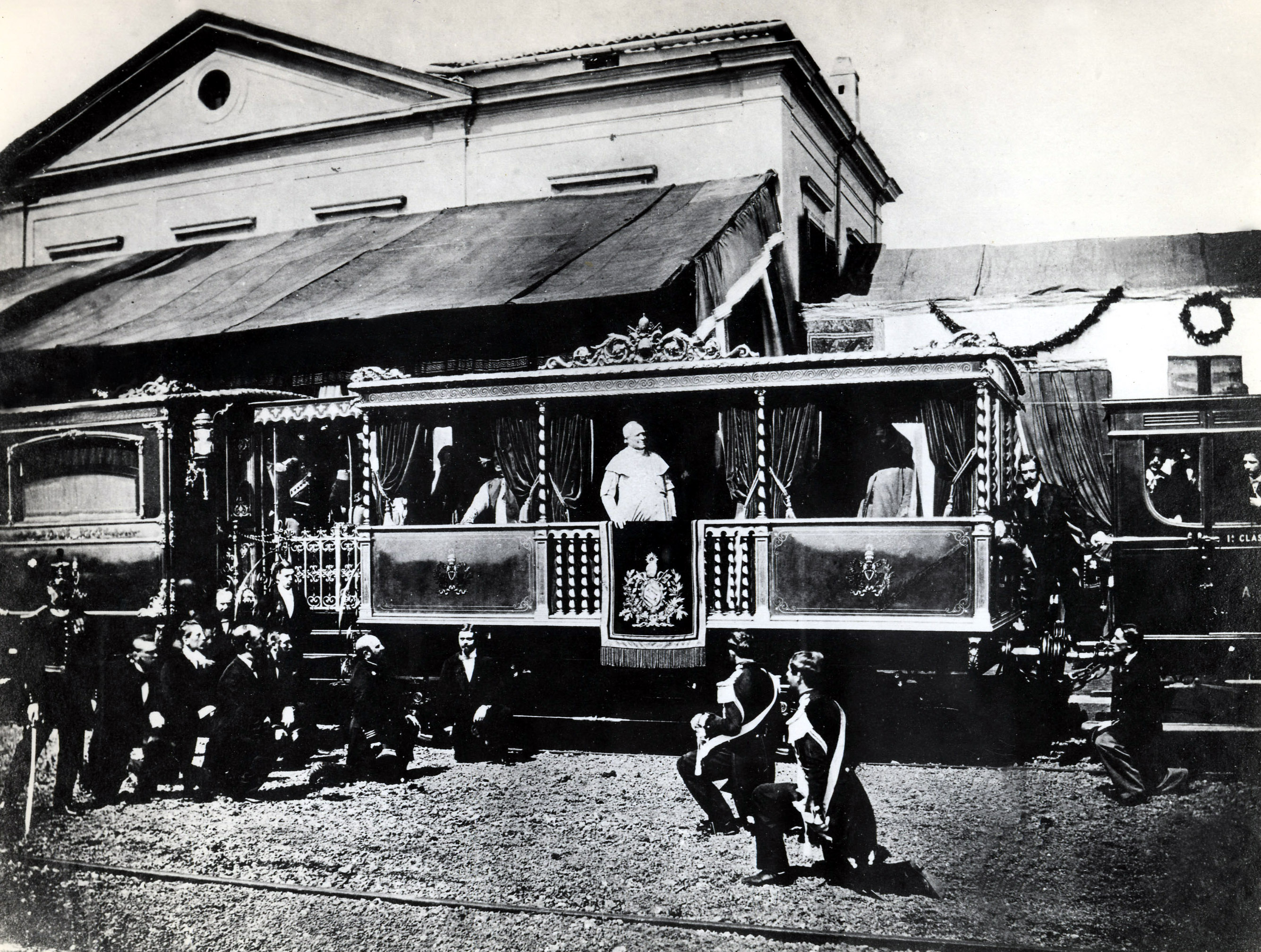
Pope Pius IX, the first pope to be photographed, in 1862

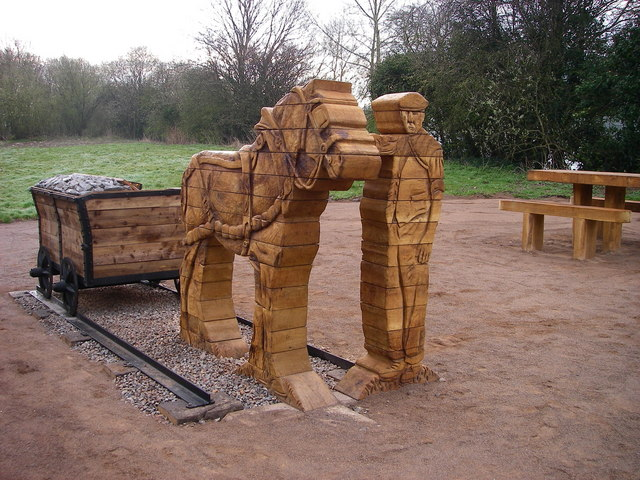
Horse-drawn carriage, monument in Brecon

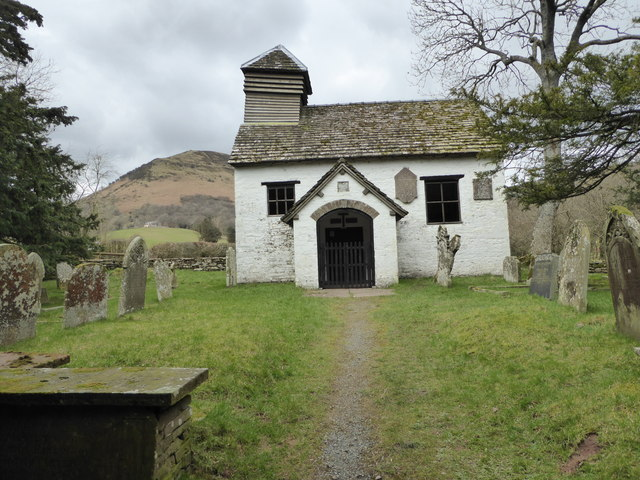
St. Mary the Virgin at Capel-y-Ffin

The book Brief Lives provides the oldest known reference to a Roman Catholic in Hay. Aubrey describes how William Watson was captured in a field by Hay, tried for treason and found guilty at Winchester, where he was executed in 1603. Lists of Papists were maintained by (the then) Anglican Diocese of St. Davids. The 1706 list identifies Roger Harper an innkeeper and the 1767 list identifies two unnamed female milliners aged 30 and 60.

Following the Roman Catholic Relief Act 1829, the Catholic population in England and Wales was on a rising trajectory. In 1850, Pope Pius IX restored the hierarchy of dioceses in England and Wales in Universalis Ecclesiae. Wales was split between the Diocese of Shrewsbury and the Diocese of Newport and Menevia. Misunderstanding of a pastoral letter by Cardinal Wiseman (the Archbishop of Westminster) prompted the burning of effigies of the Pope and the Cardinal throughout England. On November 5th 1850, a small group of protesters burnt effigies by the Hay-on-Wye clock tower. Parishioners from St. Mary's (St Mary's Road) and their Vicar Rev. Dr. W. L. Bevan were conspicuously absent from the protest.

Without a Roman Catholic church in Hay-on-Wye, the faithful assisted one another to get to churches in Brecon, Weobley, Belmont and Hereford. From 1812, horse-drawn carriages running on rail, transported goods between Brecon and Hay-on-Wye. The track passed along the back of what would become the Tabernacle Chapel and was known by locals as Platform 4. In 1864, the Hereford, Hay and Brecon Railway was opened for passengers and goods, reusing the tramway track. Roman Catholic's that could afford train travel were able to get to Churches in Hereford and Brecon, until the line was closed in 1962.

Before St. Joseph's Parish or Church existed, the clergy at Belmont and Brecon supported Roman Catholic's in Hay-on-Wye. Belmont was founded in 1859 as a house of studies for the Benedictine monasteries at Downside, Ampleforth and Douai. Until 1915, Belmont was also the Cathedral for the Roman Catholic Diocese of Newport and Menevia. The Gothic St. Michael's Roman Catholic Church in Brecon and adjoining presbytery were designed in 1851, by the architect Charles Hansom (brother of Joseph Hansom).

The origins of St. Joseph's Roman Catholic Parish had a Celtic influence. Henry Richard Grant came from Scotland in 1892. Thomas Joseph Madigan came from Ireland in 1901, as did Rose Jones (née Fitzgerald) in 1926 and the Dewan family. Rose received the Papal award, the Benemerenti medal. Many third-generation descendants of the Victorian and Edwardian families are active parishioners today.

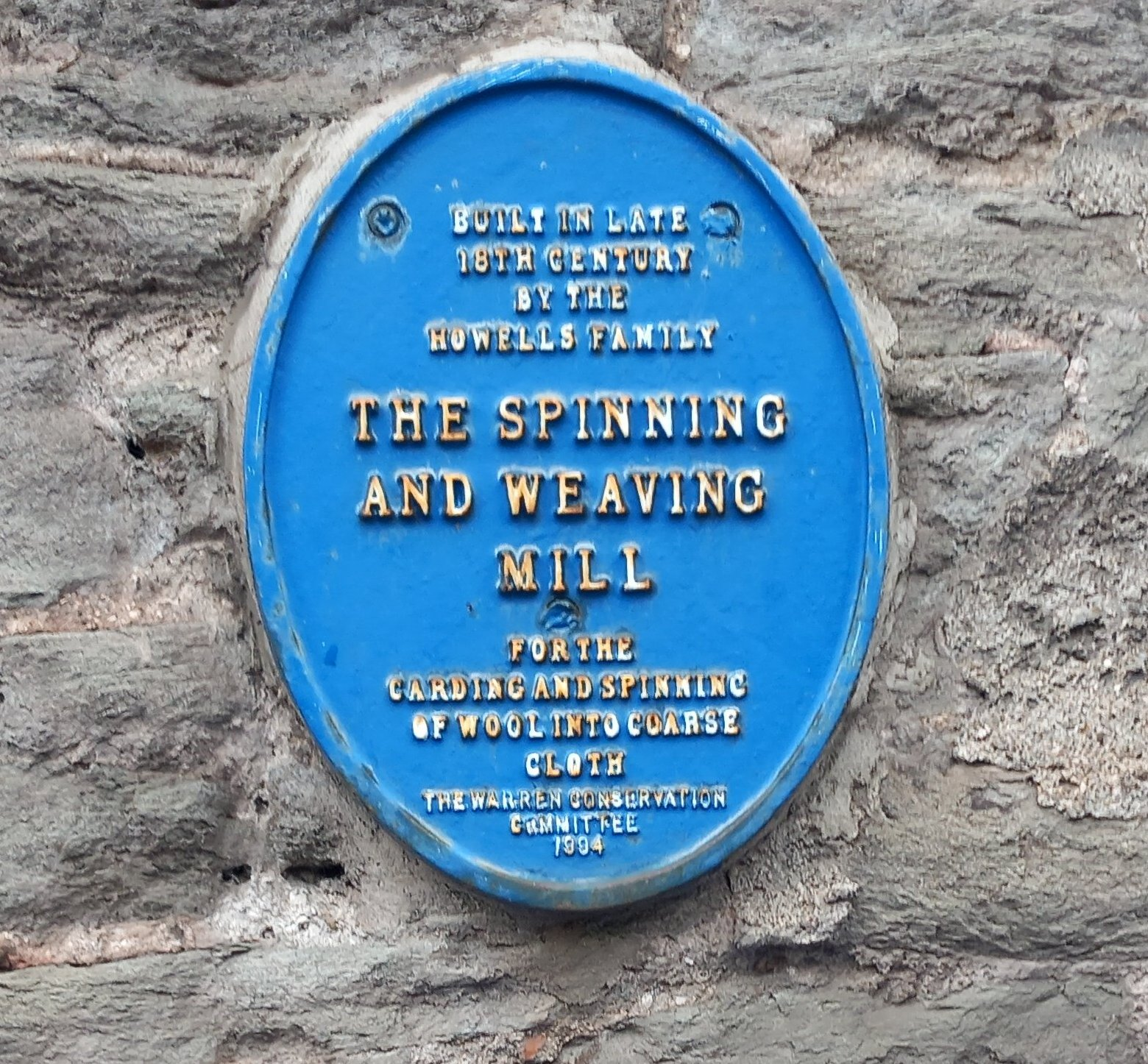
Former flannel mill and home of H.R. Grant at join of Castle St and Belmont Rd

H.R. Grant ran a newsagents/toy shop and a printing business from 6 Castle Street. Francis Kilvert was a frequent visitor to the newsagents, in the time of its previous owner George Horden. H.R. Grant was married to Jane Victoria (née Hughes), they had seven sons and two daughters. Henry Norman, their eldest son, died heroically in 1916, on the first day of the Somme offensive. The public footpath from Hay bridge to the Warren has a bench in memory of the Grant’s. Henry Norman is commemorated on the Hay-on-Wye and Cusop War Memorial.

From early in the 20th century and for the first time since the reformation, with the permission of the Bishop of Menevia, Roman Catholic Mass was celebrated in Hay-on-Wye. Regular house masses were celebrated in the homes of the Grant's and the Madigan's on alternating Sundays. The masses were served by the secular priests from Brecon (St. Michael's) or the Benedictines of Belmont (designated an abbey in 1920).

Attending school Masses was an option for families that sent their children to two schools in the area. Belmont Abbey school for boys (1926–1993) was run by the Benedictines in Belmont. St. David's school for girls in Brecon (1903–2020) was originally run by the Daughters of the Holy Spirit (from France). From 1948, the Ursuline Sisters (from Thurles, Ireland) ran the school.

In 1913, the Caldey Island Benedictine monks converted to Roman Catholicism. The monastery built by the Anglican Father Ignatius (Lyne) at Capel-y-Ffin, near Llanthony Priory, came under the ownership of a Caldey Island monk. The property was later sold to a Roman Catholic lay person who was gifted artistically, and had deep faith but shallow morality. The property hosted a Roman Catholic community of artists and crafts people known as the Guild of St. Joseph and St. Dominic. Mass was celebrated at Capel-y-Ffin from 1913, initially by a monk from Caldey Abbey.

== First mass centre in the Cheese Market (1926 - 1967) ==
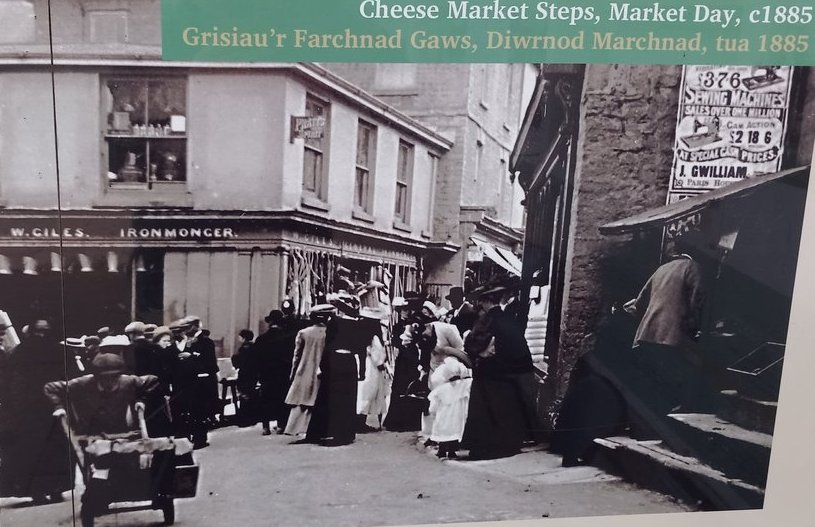
Cheese Market in 1885 poster - (displayed at the Cheese Market)

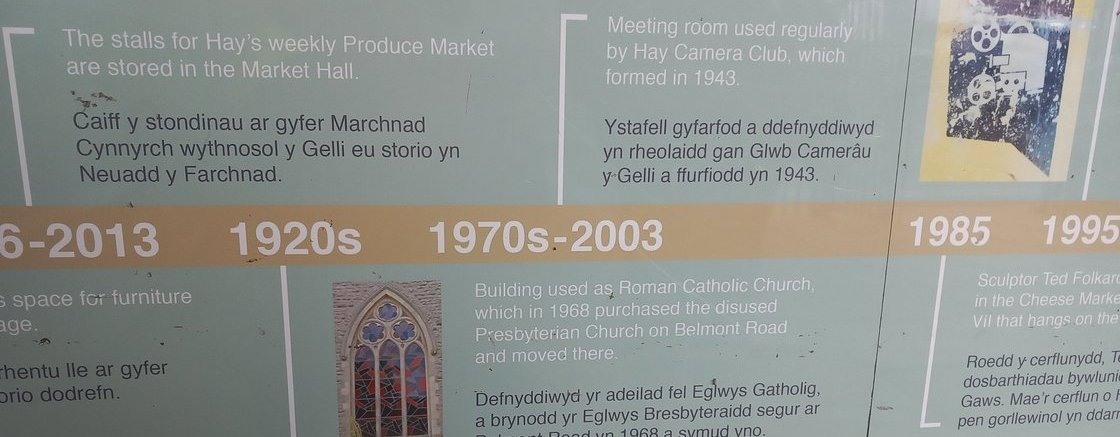
Cheese Market timeline poster - (displayed at the Cheese Market)

A combined cheese market and town hall was built in 1835 in Castle Street, on the site of a pre 17th-century Guildhall (formerly the Hay-on-Wye Town Hall). The hired rooms were rented to many local groups including the Masons until 1972. The upstairs door had "a curious peephole" and "a round circle of wood that can be slid sideways from the inside to check for intruders" alluding to secretive Masonic ceremonies.

Thomas J. Madigan (born 1878) was recorded as "a servant" in the Liverpool 1901 census. By 1909, he was a "stable hand" at Kinnersley Castle when he married Edith Adelaide James, daughter of the station master at Kinnersley railway station. They had two sons, Terrence and Desmond (aka Dessie); the brothers married two sisters Mildred and Gloria (née Harrison), respectively. By 1925, Thomas Madigan was a councillor for Hay Town Council and was a justice of the peace for Hay and Brecon. He owned two businesses in Castle Street (opposite H.R. Grant's shop), one selling car/bicycle parts and petrol from the pavement. The other business was the Plaza Cinema (now Hay Cinema Bookshop). He also owned a garage (previously owned by J.V. Like) opposite the Swan Hotel. Thomas gained his knowledge of car mechanics from a correspondence course.

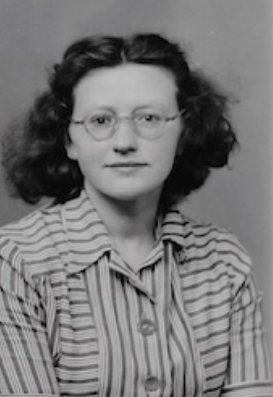
Eileen Ashton courtesy of her daughter Bridget

In 1926, Madigan acquired the lease from the local council for the two upper rooms over the Cheese Market, which were used by the Market Street stall holders for storage. The smaller room was used as the sacristy. The larger room became the first St. Joseph's Roman Catholic Church in Hay-on-Wye, and was the third Christian denomination to temporarily use the rooms. Previously the rooms were used by the Wesleyan Methodists (before moving to Trinity Chapel in Oxford Road, built in 1872) and the Independent Methodists (before moving to Ebenezer Chapel in Broad Street, built in 1845). St. Joseph's Parish was created in 1926 when Bishop Francis Vaughan, the Bishop of Menevia, gave consent for Roman Catholic mass to be celebrated in the hired rooms.

Fr. Herbert Flannery (then parish priest in Weobley) suggested a mass centre in Hay-on-Wye. Colonel Abel Morrell of Wyecliffe, Miss Binney (who later became a nun) and St. Joseph's first parish priest Fr. Herbert Flannery (from Belmont Abbey) spent months decorating and furnishing the dilapidated assembly room. They acquired surplus pews from Weobley and Belmont. The mass centre was served either by the Belmont clergy from 1926 to 1930 and 1939 to 1948 or the Brecon clergy from 1930 to 1939 and 1948 to 1959. Current parishioners remember that the assembly room ceiling leaked when it rained. Eventually, the weight of roosting pigeons on the compromised roof structure caused it to collapse onto the altar below. The smell of the pigeon droppings remained long after the roof was repaired. Although the staircase was wide, transporting coffins up and down the steep staircase was challenging. There was a public toilet in the market hall below the rooms. The assembly room became known as the "Catholic church on top of the public loo" - or similar wording!

Without a Roman Catholic school in Hay-on-Wye, Fr. John Brady (the "kind priest") introduced a catechism class on Saturday afternoons in the assembly room. Catechist Eileen Biddle is fondly remembered by current parishioners. In good weather she would transfer the class to her home overlooking the River Wye in Witney-on-Wye. Eileen hosted garden parties to raise funds for the church.

Eileen Ashton, a convert, acted as the ad-hoc caretaker, church cleaner, and organist (playing the harmonium). She was mother to five children, including author Bridget Gubbins (née Ashton). She fostered another child, fed the visiting clergy, kept a diary and was engaged in many altruistic activities. Together with Miss Chappell, headmistress of Craswall school, they were liturgical animators encouraging the congregation with hymn singing during the Mass. Benediction followed Sunday Mass on special occasions like Trinity Sunday.

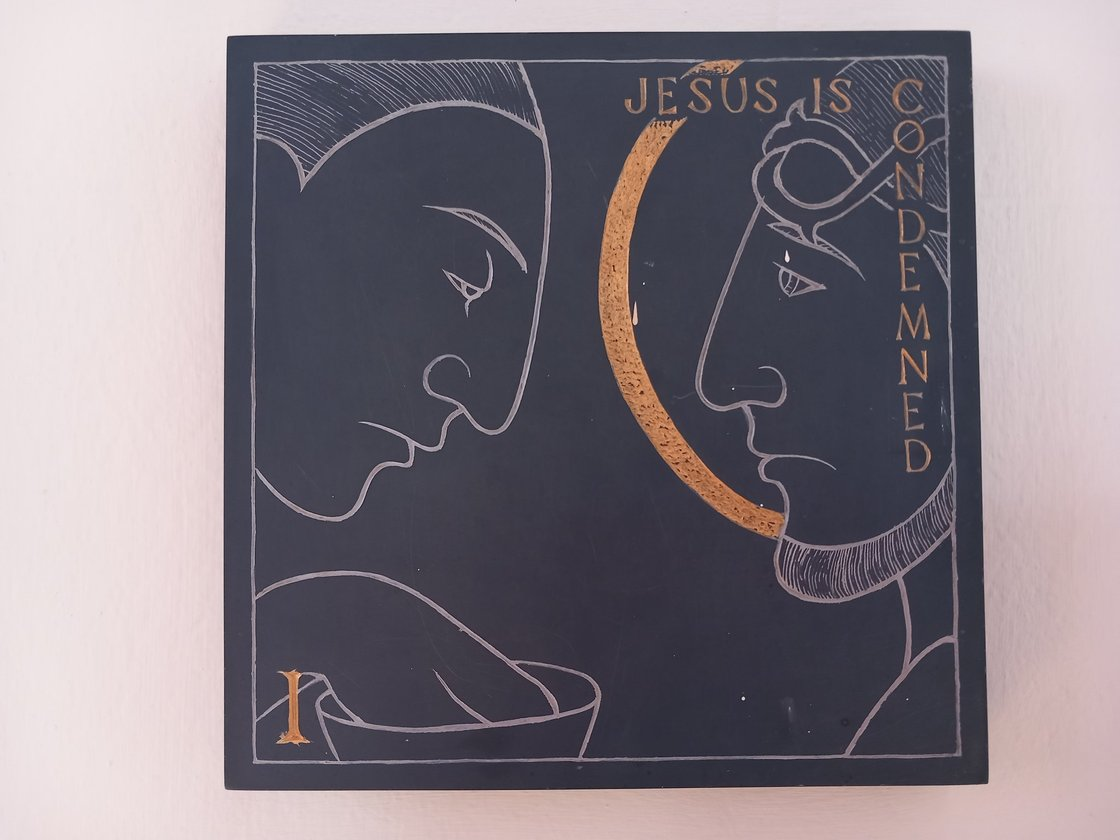
Stations of the Cross #1 - Jesus is condemned to death

Mass attendance grew during World War II as Roman Catholic evacuees were billeted to Hay-on-Wye. The military section of the Mid-Wales Hospital at Talgarth became a prisoner of war (POW) hospital. German and Italian POWs are buried in the Hay-on-Wye cemetery. Mass attendance was also increased by former Italian POWs who stayed in Wales. Ricuecio Biagio, Adeldo Raffaele and others lived and worked in a timber yard in Hay-on-Wye. Also, Polish refugees were resettled to Hay-on-Wye. Mr Pyrzakowski (aka Kosky) had a clock and watch repair workshop in Hay-on-Wye. His wife was an artist and music teacher.

On one occasion Fr. Patrick Shannon was called away after Mass on a family emergency, and had to leave the Blessed Sacrament. The bishop gave permission to John Grant and Thomas Madigan to watch and pray with the Blessed Sacrament in the period before collection. In 1951, the mass centre was formally registered for marriages. The first Roman Catholic marriage in Hay-on-Wye in more than four centuries took place in St. Joseph's. Fr. William Cubley married Terrence (son of T.J. and Edith Madigan) and Mildred (née Harrison).

== First resident parish priest (1960) ==
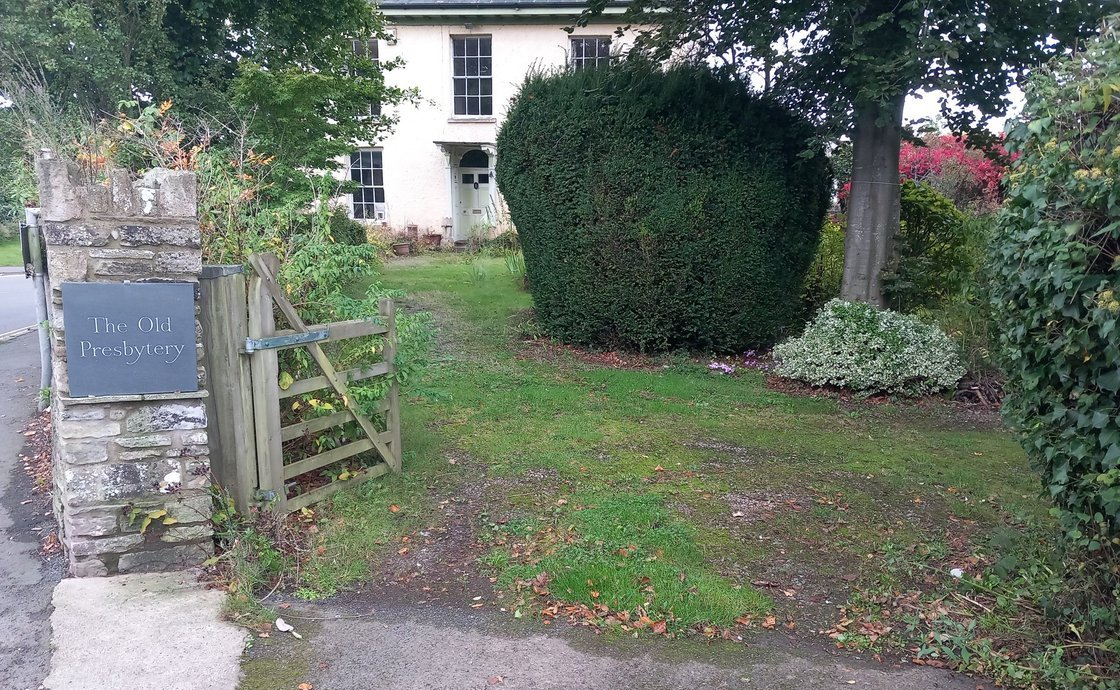
Old presbytery, Church St.

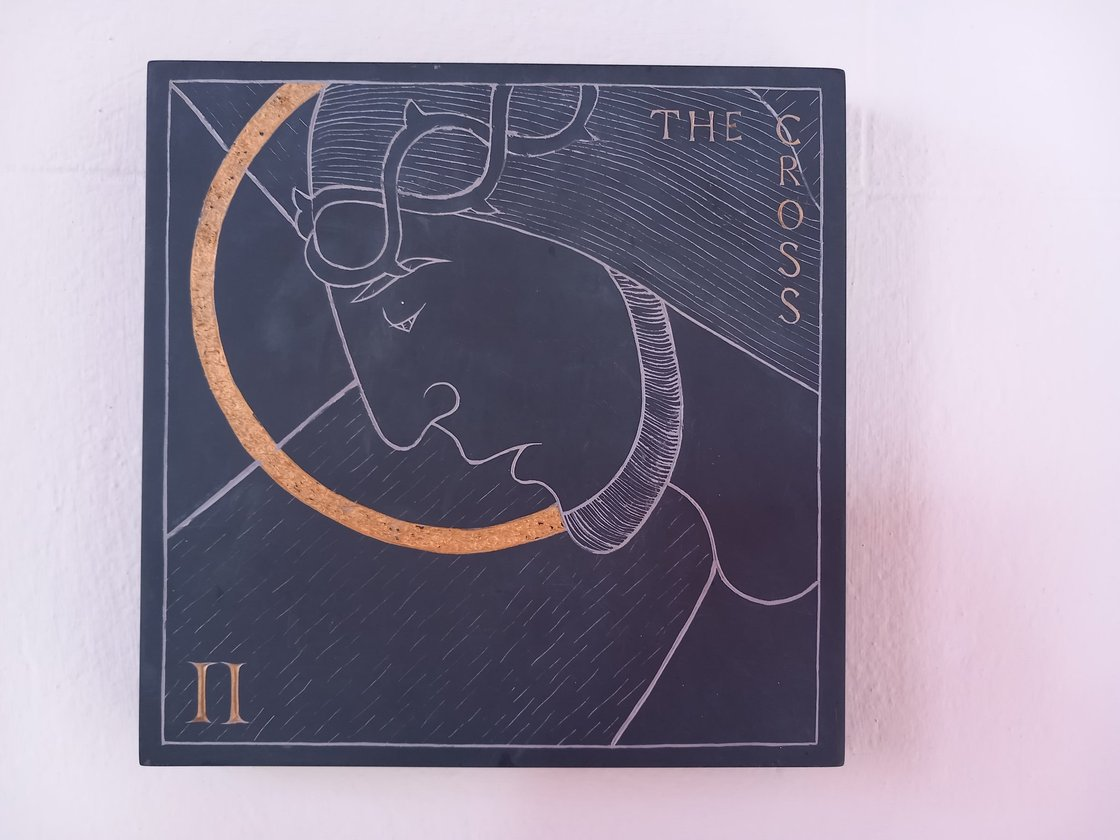
Stations of the Cross #2 - Jesus carries His cross

In the late 1950s, John and Clive Grant, Des Madigan and other parishioners raised money to buy the Grade II listed Ashbrook House, in Church Street. This was known as the old presbytery. The intention was to build a church in the grounds at some future date. In October 1960, Bishop John Petit the Bishop of Menevia appointed Fr. Hugh Healy as the first resident Roman Catholic Parish Priest since the 16th century. He lived in the old presbytery. Anecdotal evidence by current parishioners reveal that Fr. Healy celebrated a very early Sunday morning Mass at St. Mary's Chapel, Capel-y-Ffin, a distant outpost of the parish. He then rushed back to Hay-on-Wye to celebrate early Mass in the Cheese Market. A Church Building Funding Committee was set up, achieving excellent results. External practical and financial support was provided by Cyfeillion Amgueddfa Cymru (Friends of National Museum Wales), plus from the Sisters of Mercy and the school children they taught in Glenamaddy, County Galway, Ireland.

Fr. Healy's zeal for fund raising was tireless. He held monthly jumble sales on the lawn of the old presbytery. He would drive around the UK (and Eire) to collect jumble, furniture and other items. He was affectionally known as "Steptoe" and the "King of the Totters". He would often repair and renovate the items to make a few shillings for the parish. He made leather belts and wallets to order, and would sell them in Covent Garden, London.

== First parish church (1967) ==
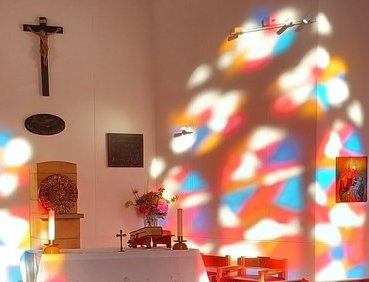
"I am the light of the world. Whoever follows me will not walk in darkness, but will have the light of life." John 8:12.

In 1967, rather than build a new church within the grounds of the old presbytery, Fr. Healy purchased the Tabernacle Chapel, Belmont Road. The cost was £1,500, worth about £35,000 today. It was refurbished, furnished, re-roofed and adapted for Roman Catholic use by the firm of architects F.R. Bates, Son & Price of Newport at a cost of £6,000 (at the time) leaving a debt over £3,000 (at the time). The architects specialised in modernising Catholic churches across South Wales. The building contractor was Mr Percy Price of Hay-on-Wye. For the first time St. Joseph's R.C. Parish had its own Church building. On May 28, 1967 (Ascension day), the church was blessed and opened by Bishop Petit who participated in the Second Vatican Council. The ecumenical spirit of the Second Vatican Council was manifest by the attendance of local clergy from other Christian denominations.

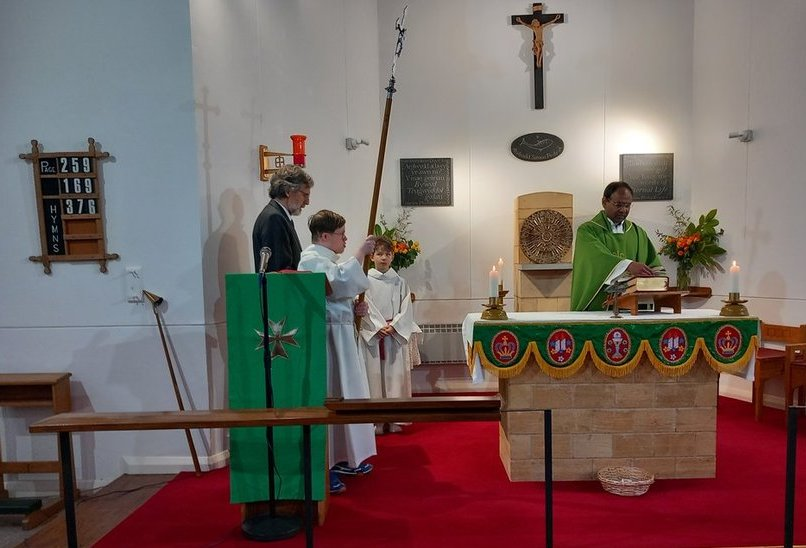
Liturgy of the Eucharist - Taking, thanking, breaking, giving

In 1967, the Presbyterian Rev. Dr Ian Paisley and other outsiders came to Hay-on-Wye to lead a group of protesters about the repurposing of the Tabernacle Chapel. Like the 1850 group of protesters who burnt effigies by the Hay-on-Wye clock tower, the group was small. He did not suffer the same fate as the Methodist martyr William Seward, but he did endure the same lack of influence over the locals. Richard Booth revealed that the outsiders did not reflect the view of the people of Hay-on-Wye. In the spirit of ecumenism, Rev. Tom Wright a Presbyterian from Coleg Trefeca, said he was pleased with the "link with the building's past" and he was "pleased that God was still to be honoured on that spot".

Fr. Healy was a popular figure around town. He always had time to stop and talk, especially when walking his dog. He was a regular at the nearby Indian restaurant - he would have approved of Fr. Jimmy's annual curry night. Parishioner Des Madigan, recounts that Fr. Healy said he would "like to die with his boots on". He did, having to be carried from the altar in 1984, and dying soon after. Fr. Healy carved his name into the history of Hay-on-Wye, a revered and much loved character by the parishioners and the people of Hay-on-Wye.

One of Fr. Healy's more eccentric parishioners also carved her name into the history of Hay-on-Wye. The author Lady Penelope Betjeman (wife of the Poet Laureate John Betjeman) would often "come into town on her pony and trap, wearing a chunky knitted jumper and jodphurs".

St. Joseph's Church choir called the "Holy Joes" were formed in the 1970s. The first organist was Des Madigan who was renowned for playing the organ loudly. Consequently, the "Holy Joes" were renowned for singly loudly, aka "the Jumpers". His wife Gloria later took over the organist role. They both gave piano lessons to local children including local pianist Anna Fry. Current "Holy Joes" and Madigan descendant's include alto Dawn Beethan and organist Julie O’Reilly who like her parents led the choir up to the Covid years. Convert Pat Hammond is the current organist/liturgical animator. Since the 2nd Vatican Council the role of the liturgical animator is to animate i.e. encourage active participation by the congregation in the liturgy.

== First Presbytery adjoining the church (1985) ==
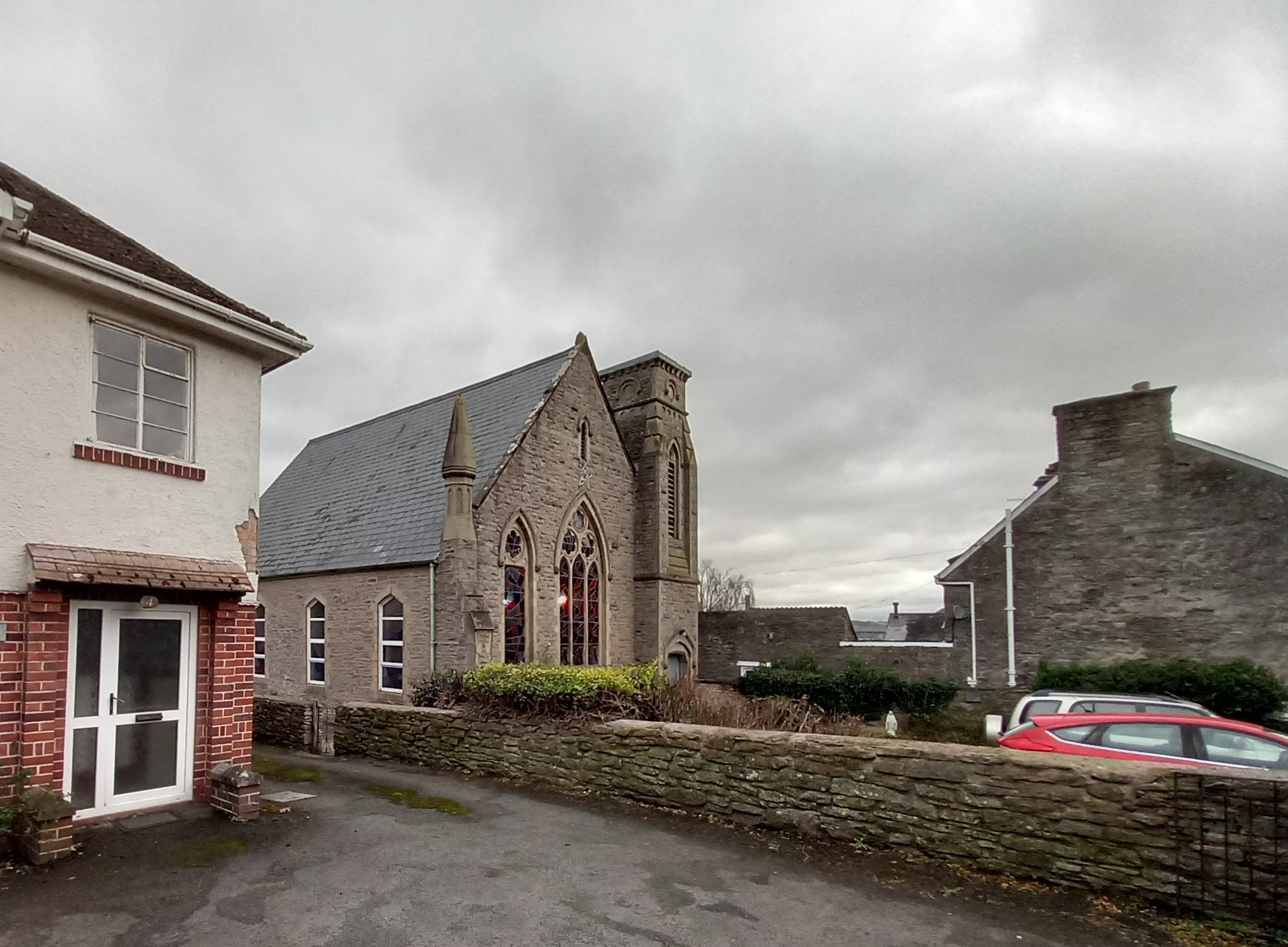
Vatican City

The old presbytery was later sold, in order to purchase the new presbytery adjoining the church in 1985. Parish Priest Fr. Patrick Murray, lived in a small flat in Oxford Road for a few months until the purchase was completed. Monsignor Canon Clyde Johnson encouraged Bishop James Hannigan to purchase the house which was to become the new presbytery, "bringing great joy and encouragement to the parishioners". The presbytery was also used as a parish centre, important in a town with low capacity social venues. Additional masses were celebrated in the house for ad-hoc family events. The house and the spacious gardens were used for parish social events. The house flanking the new Presbytery was previously owned by John Grant (the grandson of H.R. Grant). The house on the other side of the church was owned by another Roman Catholic, Rose Jones. The house that became the new presbytery was built in 1938 by Mr John Watkins of MiddleWood for Ralph Jones, brother-in-law of Rose. The cluster of adjacent buildings was affectionally dubbed by Rose as "Vatican City".

Since 2019, St. Joseph's has been served by St. Michael's in Brecon. As the presbytery is no longer needed as a residence for a parish priest, the diocese decided to renovate the property. Since early 2026 the property has been rented, raising funds for the church.

== More recently ==
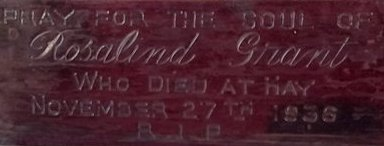
Rosalind Grant (died 27 November 1936), daughter of H.R. Grant and Jane Grant

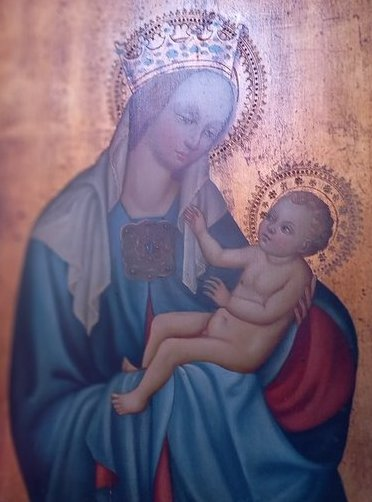
- The Madonna and Child icon was a gift to the Parish from Monsignor Canon Clyde Johnson.
  On 12 June 1992 (Ascension day), the Silver Jubilee of the opening of St. Joseph's Mass was concelebrated by Bishop Daniel Mullins the Bishop of Menevia, the dean and the priests of the deanery.
- The parishes of the deanery have often held a day of recollection in Advent and Lent at Belmont Abbey.
- The patronal feast day is celebrated annually with a social event organised by parishioners in the Hay-on-Wye parish hall or the Royal British Legion.
- The garden outside the church, dedicated to Our Lady, was created by Maggie Sims during a COVID lockdown. Hard landscaping was provided by John Darlison.
- Fr. Jimmy organises an annual curry night in Brecon for both parishes.
- Norman Keylock (and family) creates spectacular Christmas and Easter devotional tableau scenes annually.
- Martin McNamara was the clerk of works for the conservation-led renovation and repair of Hay Castle in Hay-on-Wye.
- Recently, parishioner Petro Birov and Christina Watson exhibited their exemplary religious icons in St. Johns Chapel in Hay-on-Wye and Hereford Cathedral. Petro (and his wife Eva) are the latest in the tradition of artistically gifted parishioners which includes Caitriona Cartwright (Stations of the Cross) and Sister Maureen Scrine NDS (The Sower sculpture).
- 2026 marks 100 years of the existence of St. Joseph's in Hay-on-Wye, originally in the Cheese Market and now Belmont Road.
- 2028 will mark 200 years of Christian worship and "honouring God" in the Belmont Rd. Chapel and Church. The great Methodist hymnists are included in the St. Joseph's parish hymnal. Anthems by three generations of the Wesleys are part of the Holy Joes' repertoire. The congregation of the Tabernacle Chapel may have sung "Hark! The Herald Angels Sing" by Charles Wesley (and George Whitefield), "O Lord, thou art my God" by Samuel Wesley (who converted to Roman Catholicism) and "Lead Me, Lord" by Samuel Sebastian.

== Church interior ==
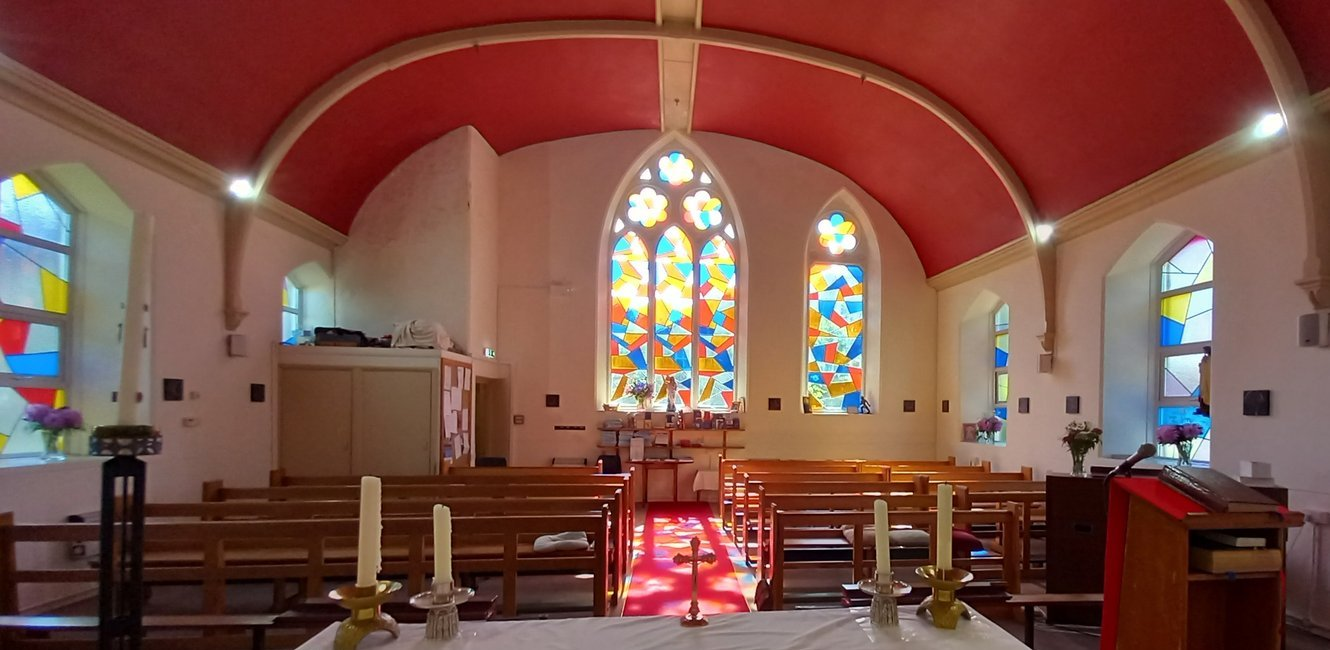
"Your word is a lamp to my feet" - Psalm 119:105

The interior curved roof is one of the few original Presbyterian architectural features following the refurbishment in 1967. The curved roof is wagon-headed; all the principal ribs are exposed, and were originally varnished.

The abstract coloured window glazing is the work of the architects F.R. Bates, Son & Price of Newport. The pews in use today were purchased in 1967. At the start of the new millennium, the windows either side of the chancel had deteriorated and had to be replaced with new window frames and stained glass. John Darlison ensured that the work was in keeping with the Hay conservation area requirements.

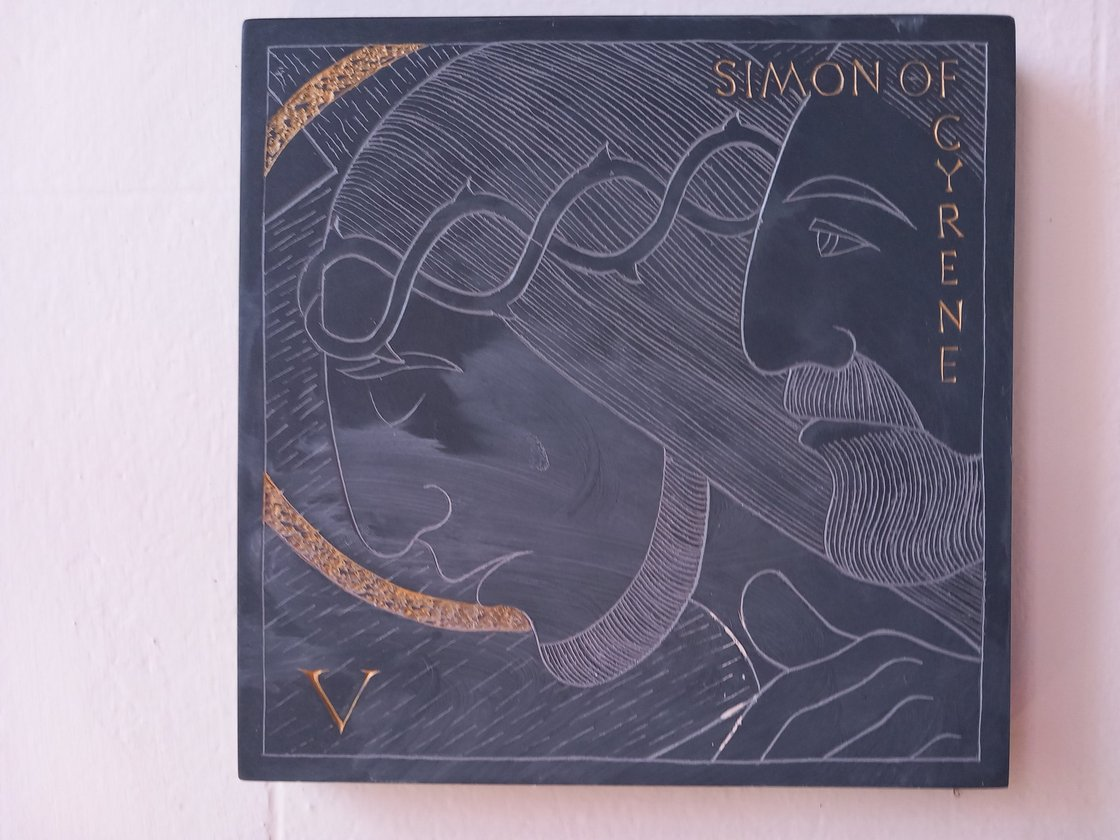
Stations of the Cross #5 - Simon of Cyrene helps Jesus to carry his cross

Another parishioner salvaged some of the original stained glass windows from a skip, repurposing some of the stained glass windows. The two large stained glass windows at the back of the church date to the 1967 refurbishment.

In the late 1990s, former Parish Priest Fr. Tim Maloney commissioned parishioner Caitriona Cartwright to create a bespoke set of Stations of the Cross. Local artisan and stonemason Caitriona carved the Stations of the Cross using slate from local Welsh quarries. Wales claims to have "roofed the world" with its slate. The text font was inspired by the letter cutting of headstones around the time of the first Tabernacle Chapel. Caitriona's other religious artwork include a baptismal font in another church. In 2025, the stations of the cross were replaced by a denoted traditional set of stations.

Original Methodist architectural documents state that the chapel measuring 41 feet by 30 feet and was designed to accommodate a congregation of nearly 260 (presumably mostly standing), i.e. 5 square feet per person.

== Church exterior ==
The church building is within the Hay Conservation area, but is not Grade II listed. The conservation area includes the entire medieval town of Hay-on-Wye.

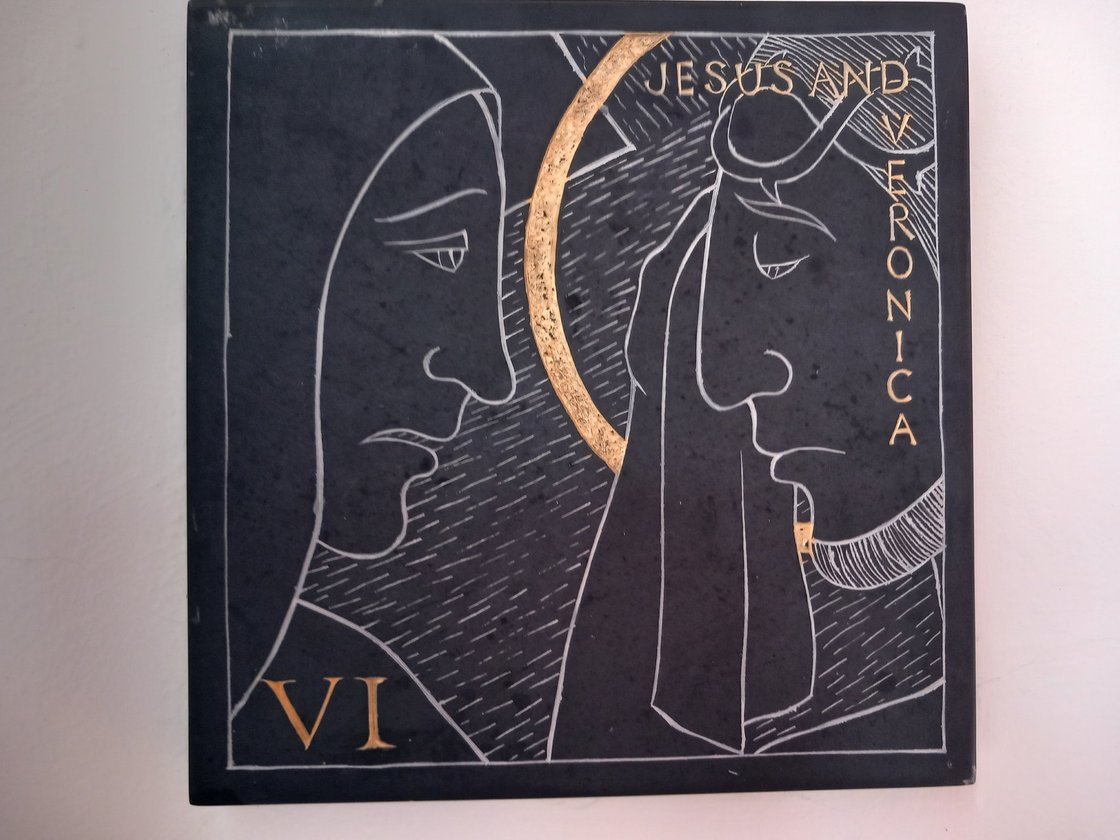
Stations of the Cross #6 - Veronica wipes the face of Jesus

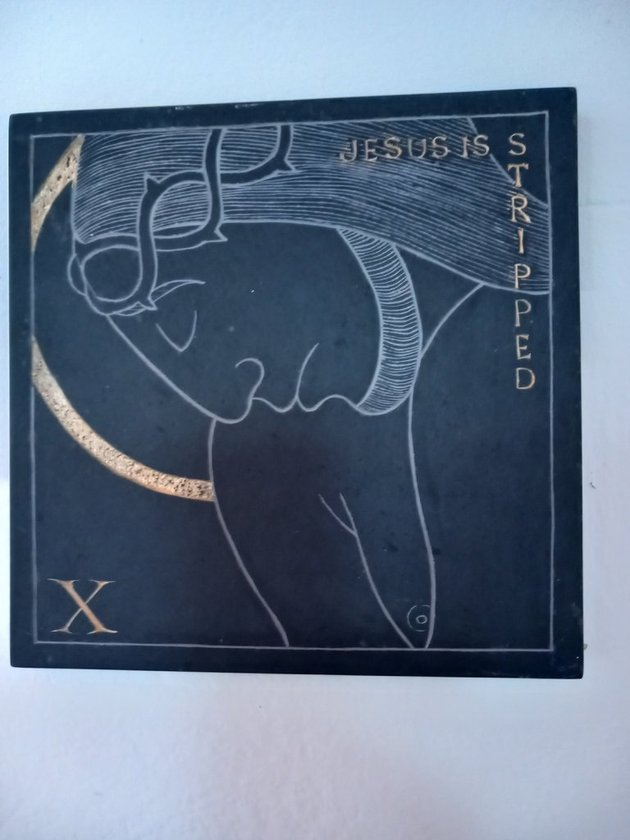
Stations of the Cross #10 - Jesus' clothes are taken away

Due to its heritage, the church is not orientated traditionally (i.e. towards the east), the altar faces towards the west. The 1878 architecture was based on the Classical and the 13th-century Gothic style of the gable entry type. The wall along the nave on the left side (looking from Belmont Rd.) terminates with a stepped buttress carried up into a pinnacle. The tower above the entrance has deep jambs and sunken heads. Above the doorway is a belfry and a 40 feet tall cornice.

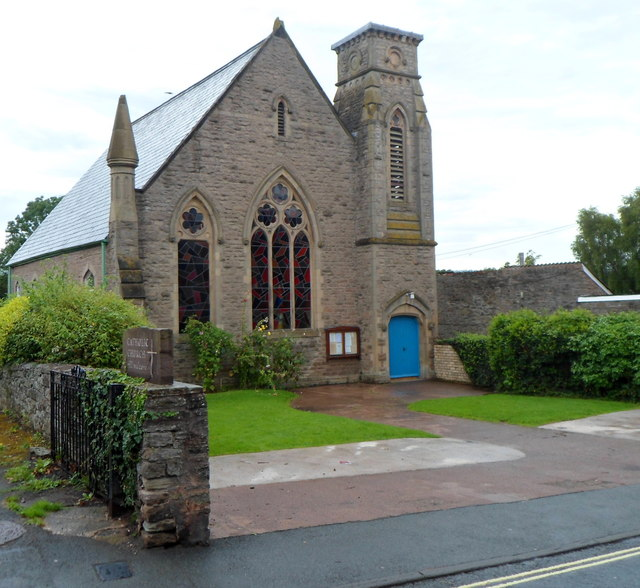
St. Joseph's today with a small parishioner car park in front of the church and presbytery

The pitched roof is covered in Welsh slate (as are the Stations of the Cross) and local stone was used for the rock-face stone front wall (looking from Belmont Road). The front walls being square random with dressings of Grinshill and Ruabon stone.

The front has one large triple-light window, and one single window with plated tracery in the heads. The gabled front central pointed window has three simply moulded lights with three hexagons in the tracery. To its left is a single pointed window (looking from Belmont Road) with a straight head to the main light and a hexagon in the tracery.

Architect Richard Owen's 1872 chapel included a framed and slated spire 20 feet high. A 1932 aerial photograph of Belmont Rd shows the spire. It is thought the unsafe spire was removed when the Church was repurposed in 1967.

== St. Joseph's Roman Catholic clergy ==
Some of the clergy from Brecon serving St. Joseph's mass centre in the Cheese Market:

- Fr. Patrick Shannon (died 1956)
- Fr. William Cubley (died 1973)
- Fr. John Brady (died 1975)
- Fr. James O’Reilly (died 1977)

Some of the clergy from Belmont serving St. Joseph's mass centre in the Cheese Market:

- Fr. Herbert Ildephonsius Flannery OSB (died 1979)

Clergy and parish priests (PP) serving St. Joseph's Church, Belmont Road:

- Fr. Hugh Healy, PP 1960–84 (died 1984)
- Fr. Martin McCormack, PP 1984 (died 1984)
- Fr. Patrick Murray, PP 1989–90 (died 1991)
- Fr. Peter Flanagan SCJ, PP 1990–95 (died 2008)
- Fr. Timothy Maloney IC, PP 1996–2013 (died 2013)
- Fr. Patrick Fitzgerald-Lombard O.Carm, PP 2017–18
- Fr. Jimmy Sebastian Pulickakunnel MCBS, PP 2014–16 and since 2019
- Monsignor Canon Clyde Hughes Johnson
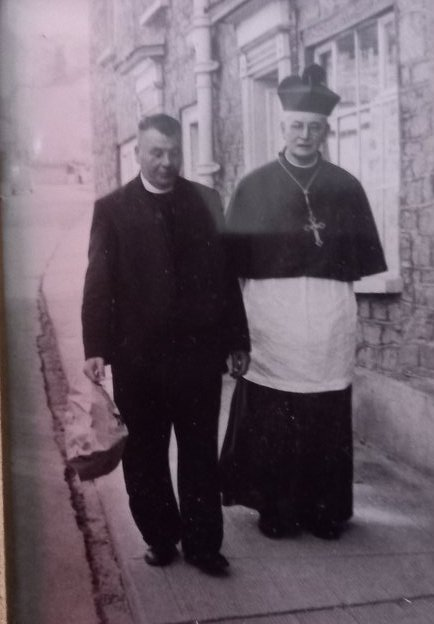
Fr. Hugh Healy (left) with Bishop Petit (right)

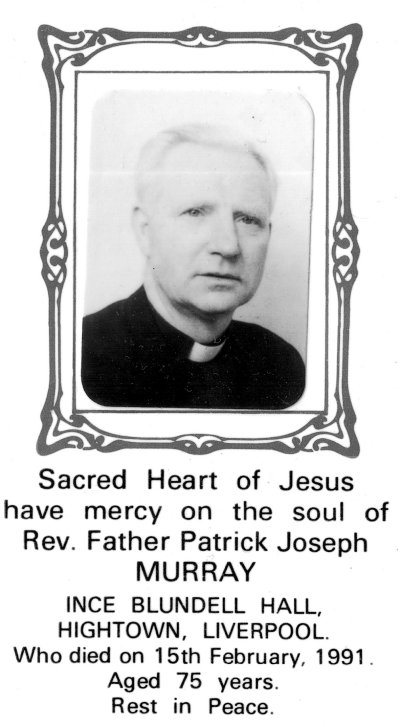
Fr. Patrick Murray

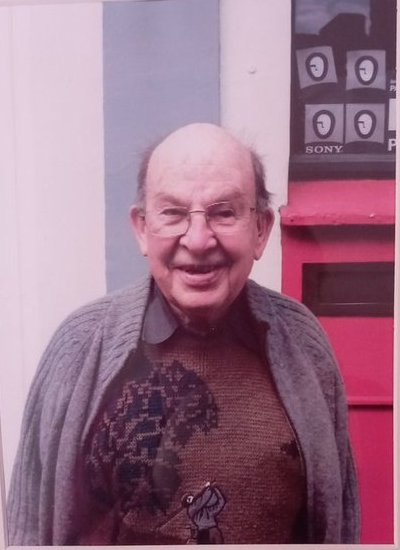
Fr. Tim Maloney - lost an eye playing rugby

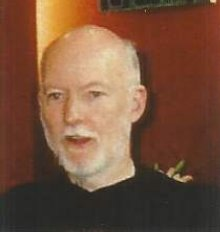
Fr. Patrick Fitzgerald-Lombard

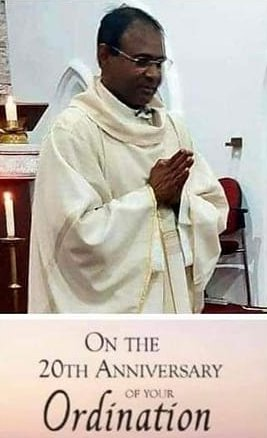
Fr. Jimmy - the current parish priest celebrated his 23rd anniversary of ordination Christmas 2025

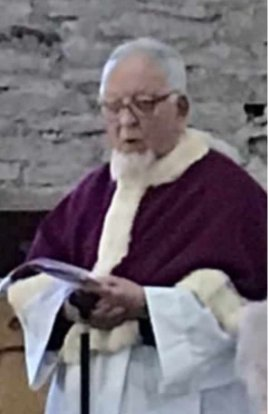
Monsignor Canon Clyde Johnson

== Notable people ==
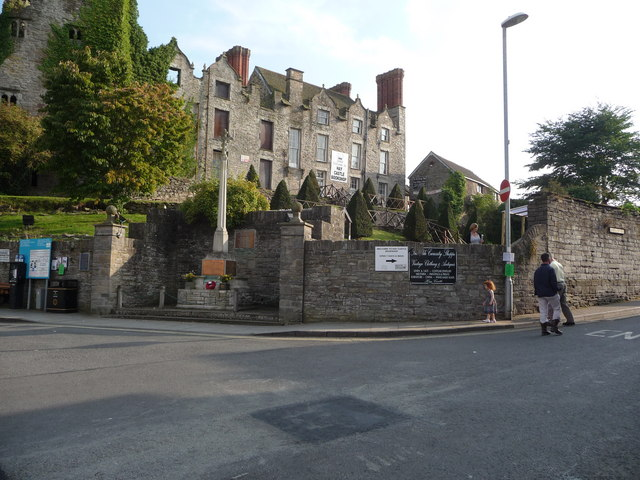
Hay-on-Wye & Cusop War Memorial

- Lady Penelope Betjeman (née Chetwode) (1910–1986), Roman Catholic who lived in Cusop Hill overlooking Hay-on-Wye. English travel writer (and wife of Poet Laureate Sir John Betjeman). Penelope was influenced to become a Roman Catholic by Evelyn Waugh.
- Dr Thérèse Coffey (born 1971), Roman Catholic, former MP and visitor to St. Joseph's Church.
- Christopher Dawson (1889–1970), Roman Catholic, who lived in Hay Castle, author of books on cultural history and Christendom.
- Bridget Gubbins (née Ashton) (born 1947), grew up in Hay-on-Wye. Her family attended St Josephs Church over the Cheese Market. She has written books on local history, social history and travel.
- Hay-on-Wye & Cusop War Memorial - Henry Norman Grant
  Henry Norman Grant (1892–1916), eldest son of Henry Richard and Victoria Grant was declared missing in action on the first day of the Somme offensive. It was more than a year before his death was confirmed.
- Francis Kilvert (1840–1879), Church in Wales curate at Saint Michael and All Angels, Clyro, author of the "Kilvert Diaries" which describe many visits to Hay-on-Wye and Llanthomas (in Llanigon).
- William Edward Thomas Morgan (1847–1940), Church in Wales vicar at St. Eigon, Llanigon, Kilvert's best man and polymath. H.R. Grant published William's book "Hay and Neighbourhood" in 1932.

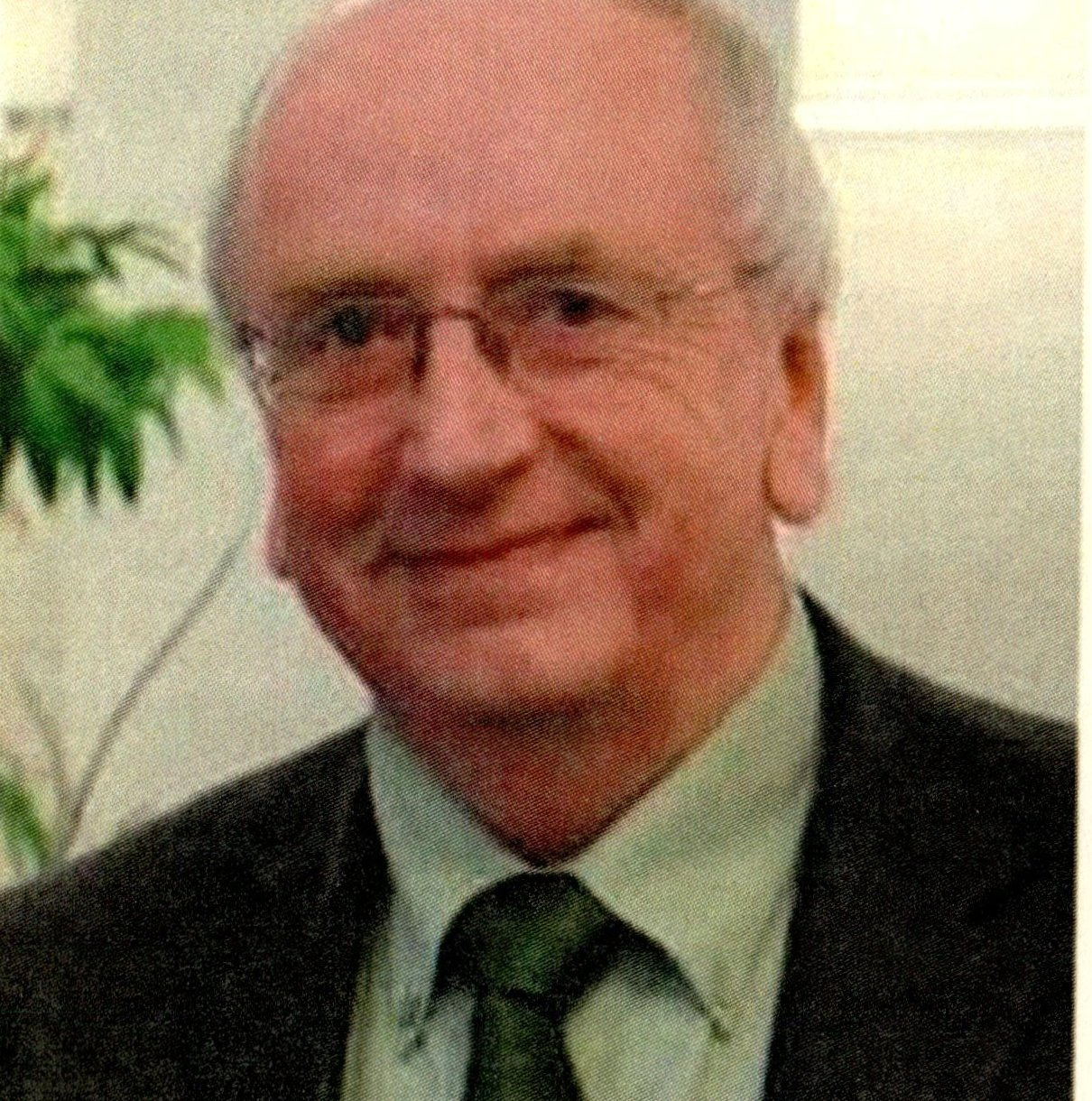
Alan Murphy

- Alan Murphy BA, FHEA (1943–2025), a parishioner, was educated by the Christian Brothers at St Edward's College, Liverpool. He obtained a teaching qualification to become a biology teacher, head of lower school and deputy headmaster. As headmaster of St Edward's school he established one of the few joint-church schools in the UK. He became a teaching fellow at St Mary's University. As senior lecturer, he was programme director for the only Catholic School Leadership MA programme currently offered in the UK that includes distance learning. This led to scholarly publications on blended learning and receiving a Teaching and Learning fellowship. After retirement he became an independent leadership consultant, specialising in Catholic education. He is buried in St Cewydd's Church, Aberedw, near where he lived with his wife Irene, and where they celebrated their golden wedding anniversary in 2019.
- Richard Owens of Liverpool designed up to 300 chapels, mostly in Wales and mostly Calvinistic Methodist. After moving from Wales to Liverpool, he designed many buildings in Liverpool including the family home of Ringo Starr (at No. 9 Madryn). Owens died in his home in Anfield Road, Liverpool at the age of 60 from gallstones and was buried in Anfield Cemetery.
- Hay-on-Wye & Cusop War Memorial - Rhys Pryddererch
  Rhys Thomas Pryddererch (or Prytherch) BA, BD (1883–1917), Calvinistic Methodist Minister. He volunteered in 1914 but was rejected on medical grounds. He declined the offer of a commission as an Army Chaplain. He wanted to serve alongside soldiers of the lowest military rank, without the privileges of an officer. Over three years, he applied four more times and was eventually accepted as a Private in the King's Regiment (Liverpool). He died within 10 days of arriving on the Western Front in World War I. He was motivated by the parable "the last will be first, and the first will be last".
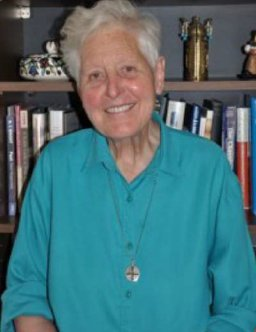
  Sr Maureen Scrine
- Leigh Richmond Roose (1877–1916), son of Calvinistic Methodist Minister Richmond Leigh Roose. He was a Wales international footballer. He attended the Holt Academy, where he was taught by H. G. Wells. Leigh survived Gallipoli but died in the Somme offensive in 1916. Commemorated at the Thiepval memorial in France, which his family discovered many years later due to the misspelling of his name.
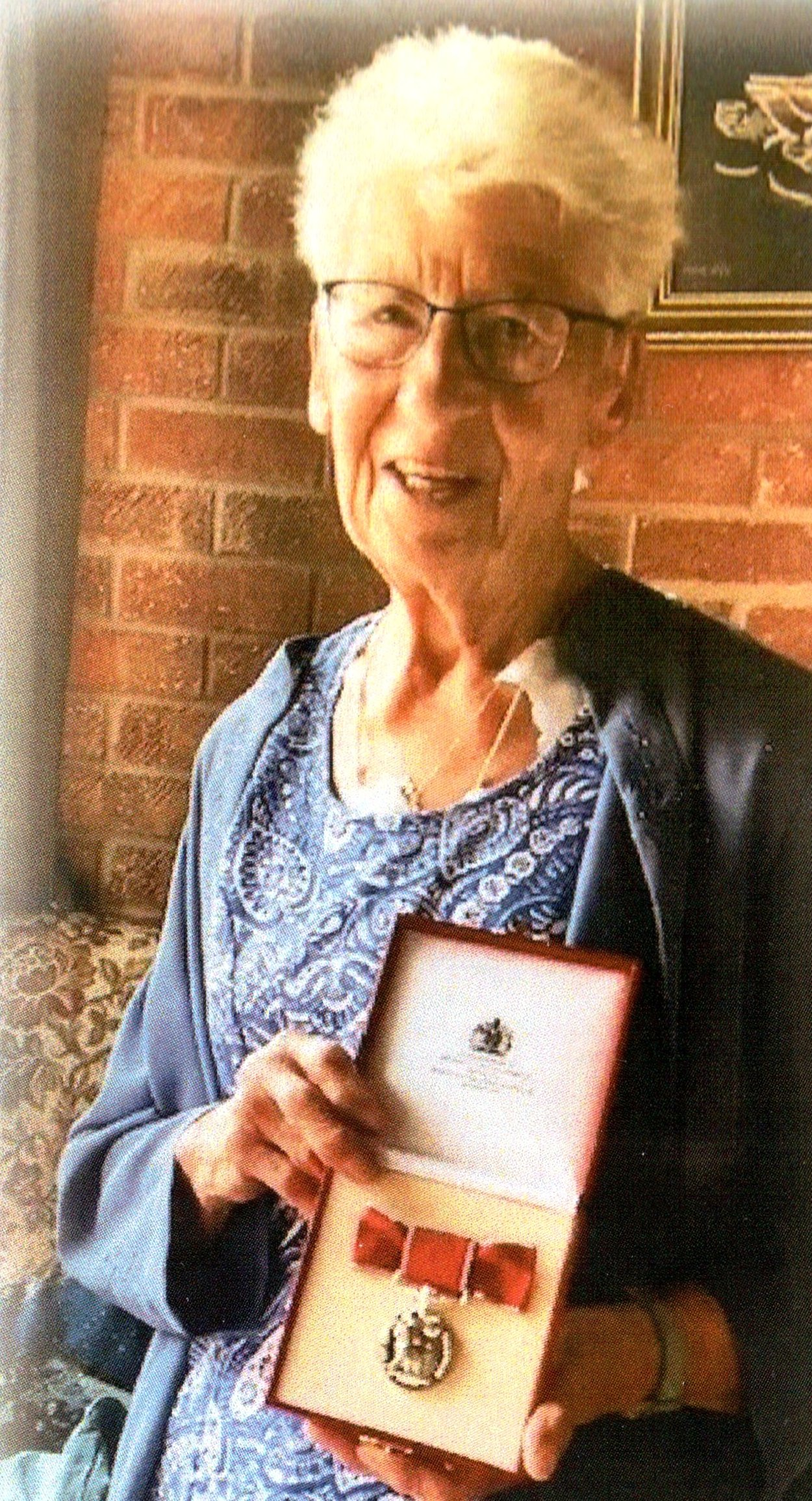
- Maggie Sims
  Sister Maureen Scrine NDS (1931–2020) a parishioner attended Our Lady of Sion school, run by the French religious order she would later join. Maureen translated Church documents between English, Portuguese and French. As a Hermit Nun she lived in France and England including Hay-on-Wye and Llanigon. Maureen was a polymath; linguist, pianist, music reviewer, artist, sculptor, gardener, computer literate and cyclist. She was much loved in the parish and the local area. She died during a COVID lockdown. Her funeral mass was streamed live.
- Maggie (Margaret) Sims B.Ed., BEM (1939–2025) a parishioner was an alumnus of the Teacher Training College of Sarum St. Michael. She became a PE Teacher, Deputy Head and Child Protection Officer. After a back operation she was told she would never walk again, but her tenacity proved the surgeons wrong. As a local Councillor for the London Borough of Harrow, she represented the Council in various roles, including head of planning in Brent. After retiring to Powys, she became a Roman Catholic, learnt Welsh and was engaged in charitable work in the locality for more than 20 years. In 2021, Maggie was awarded the British Empire Medal for "voluntary service to the NHS and to the community in Bronllys, Wales". She did not take up the (BEM) privilege of holding her funeral in St Paul's Cathedral.
- William Jones Thomas was vicar of St. Eigon in Llanigon, predecessor to William Edward Thomas Morgan. William Thomas rejected both Kilvert and Morgan as suitors for his daughters Frances (aka Daisy) and Charlotte, respectively. Thus, playing a pivotal role in the 'Kilvert story'.

== Gallery ==
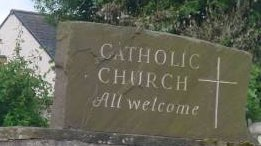
Welcome to Joseph's Roman Catholic Church, Belmont Rd in Hay-on-Wye

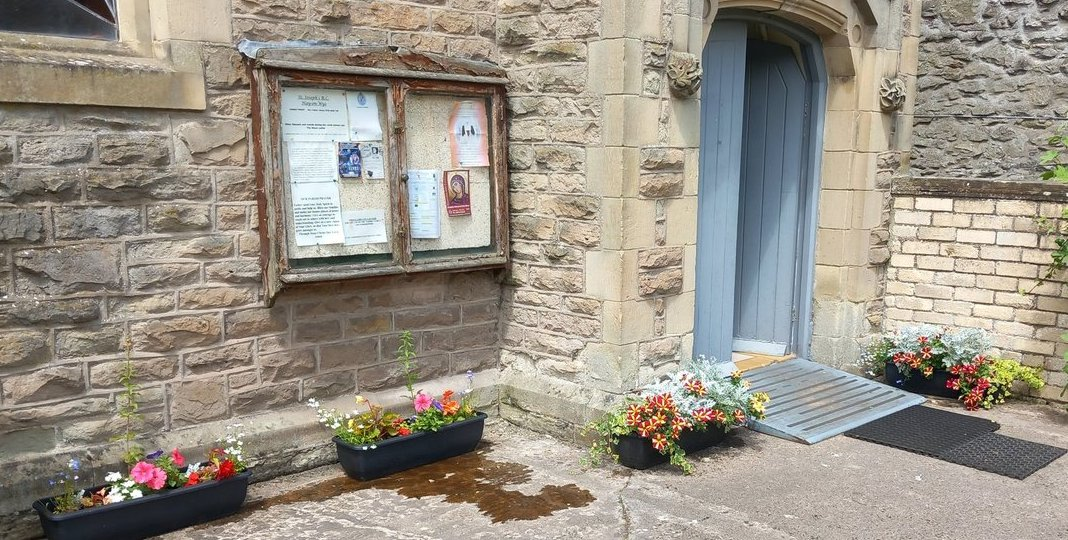
St. Joseph's porch and entrance

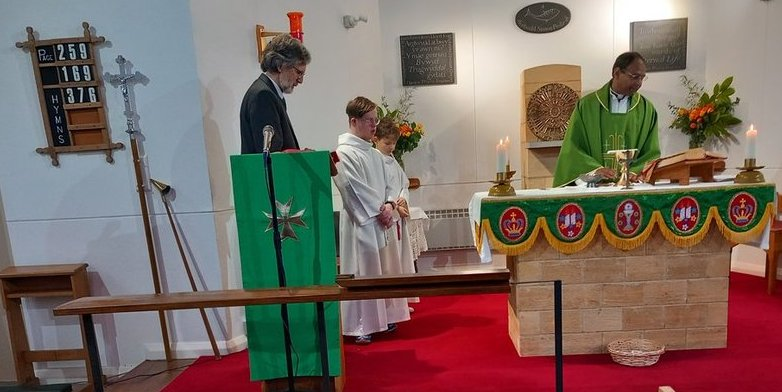
Liturgy of the Eucharist - altar servers Michael, Leo, Dan and Fr. Jimmy

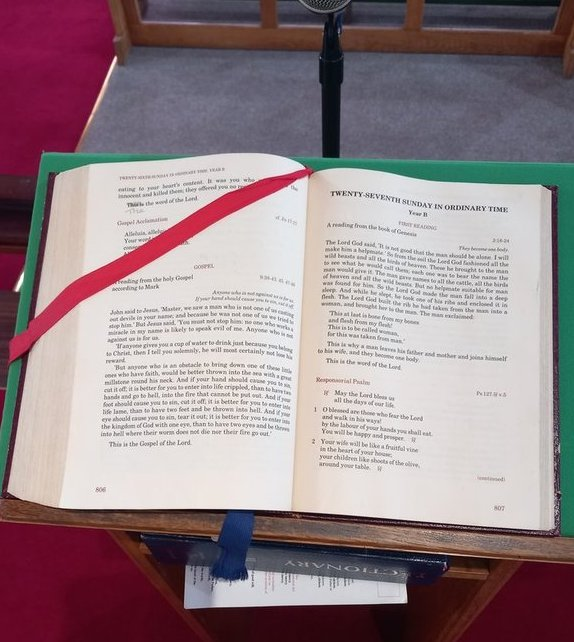
Liturgy of the Word - The word of God, written under the inspiration of the Holy Spirit

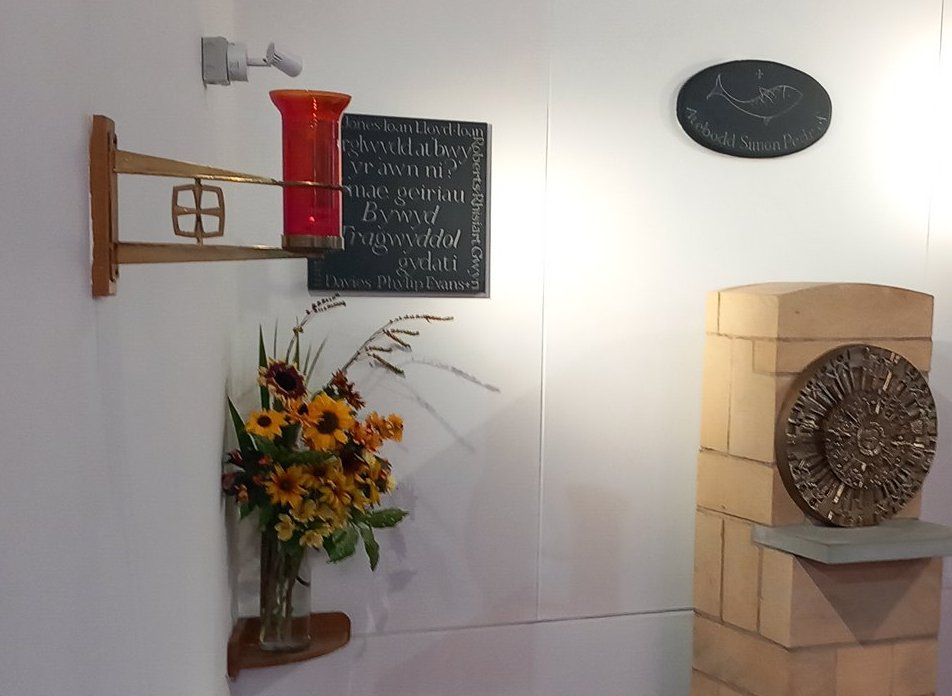
The sanctuary lamp, placed before the Tabernacle as a sign of Jesus’ presence within

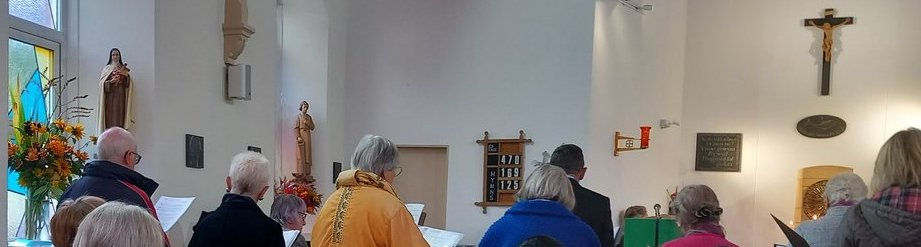
'The Holy Joes' - "Singing is the sign of the heart's joy"- Acts 2:46

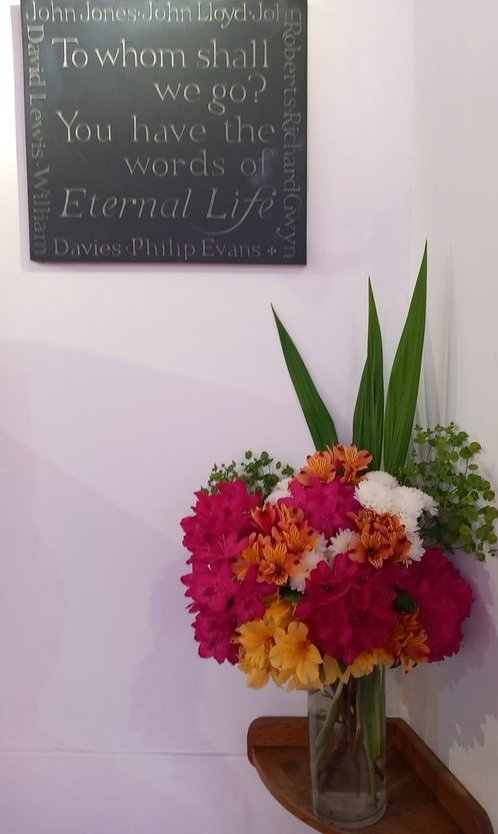
"To whom shall we go? You have the words of Eternal Life" - John 6:68-69

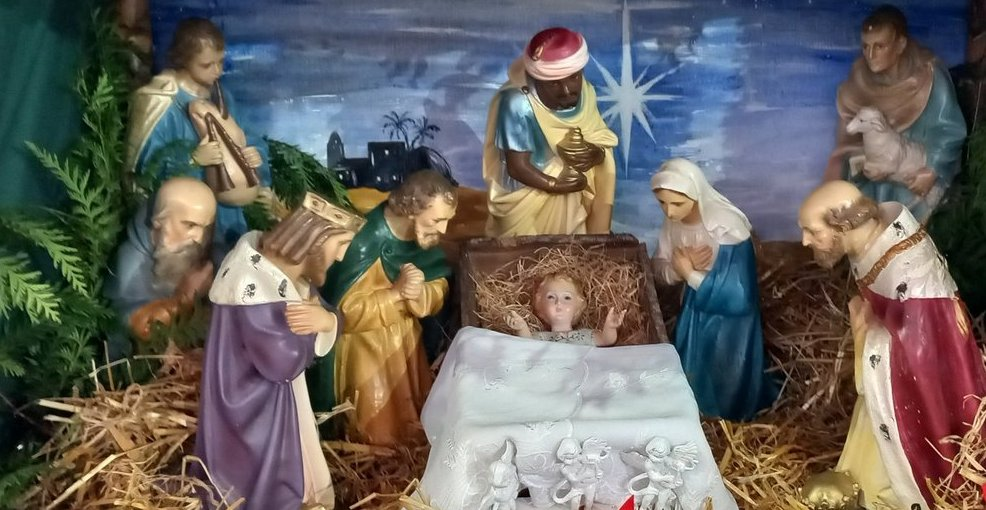
Christmas nativity tableau created by Norman Keylock (and family)

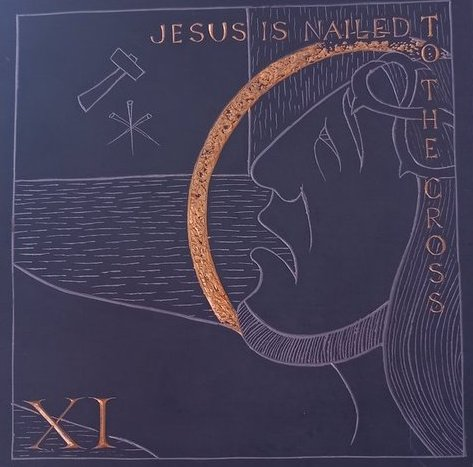
Stations of the Cross #11 - Jesus is nailed to the cross

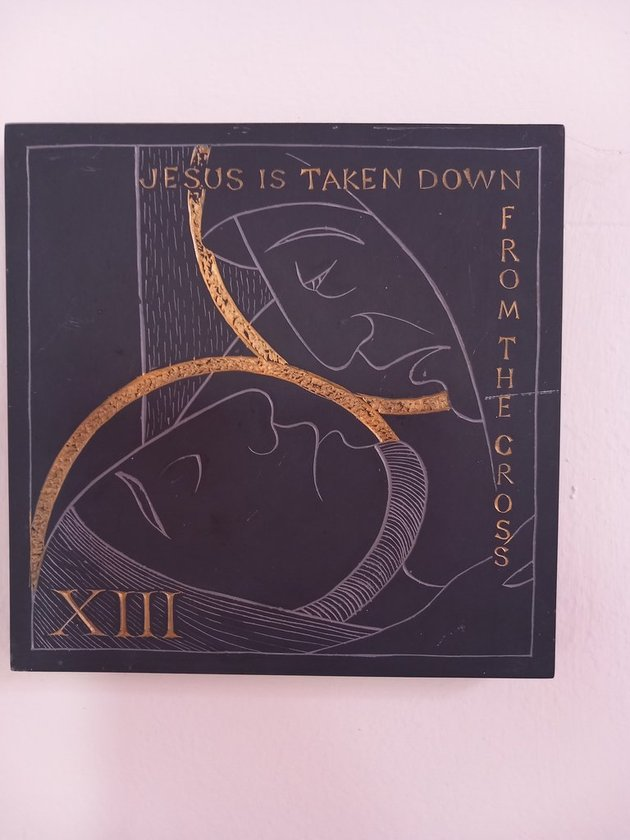
Stations of the Cross #13 - The body of Jesus is taken down from the cross

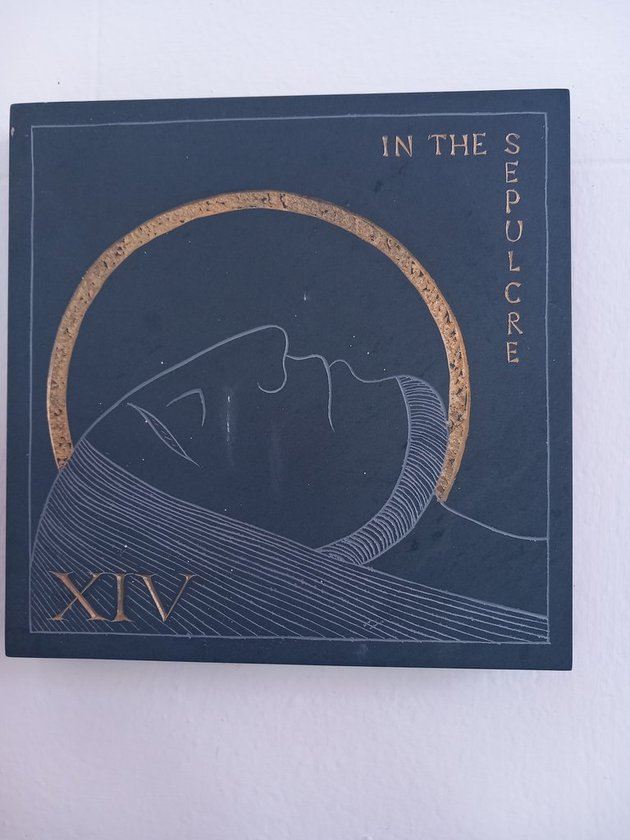
Stations of the Cross #14 - Jesus is laid in the tomb

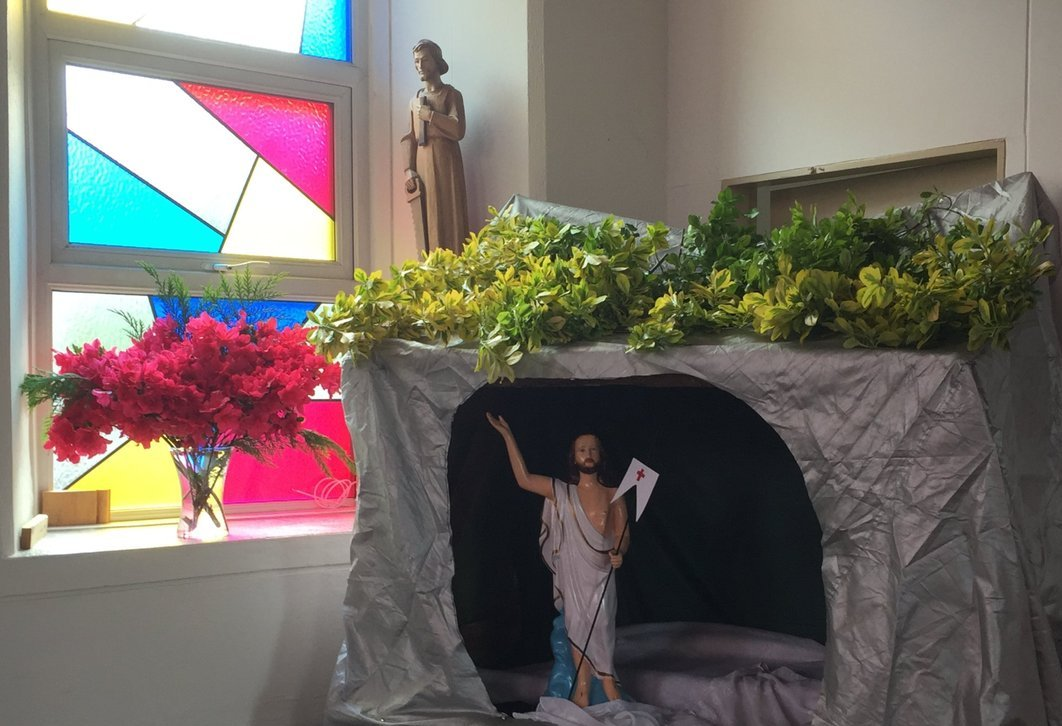
Easter tableau created by Norman Keylock (and family)

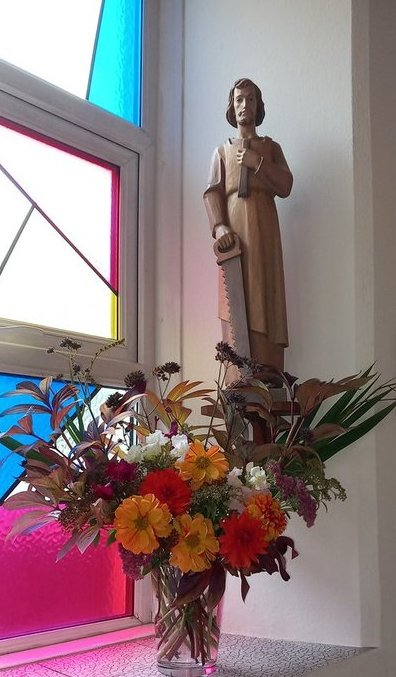
"Do not be afraid, Joseph, son of David, to take to you Mary your wife, for that which is begotten in her is of the Holy Spirit." - Matthew 1:20

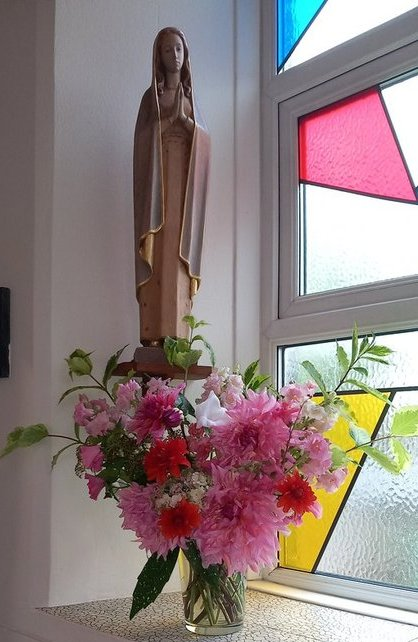
"My soul glorifies the Lord, my spirit rejoices in God, my Saviour. He looks on his servant in her lowliness; henceforth all ages will call be blessed" - Luke 1:46-47

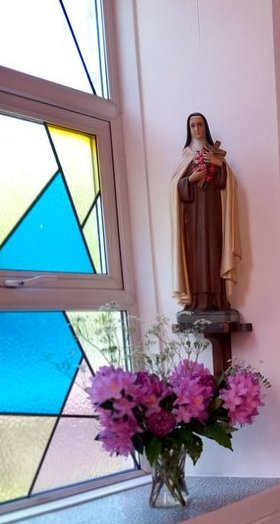
Prayer means "...a cry of grateful love from the crest of joy or the through of despair." - St. Therese of Lisieux

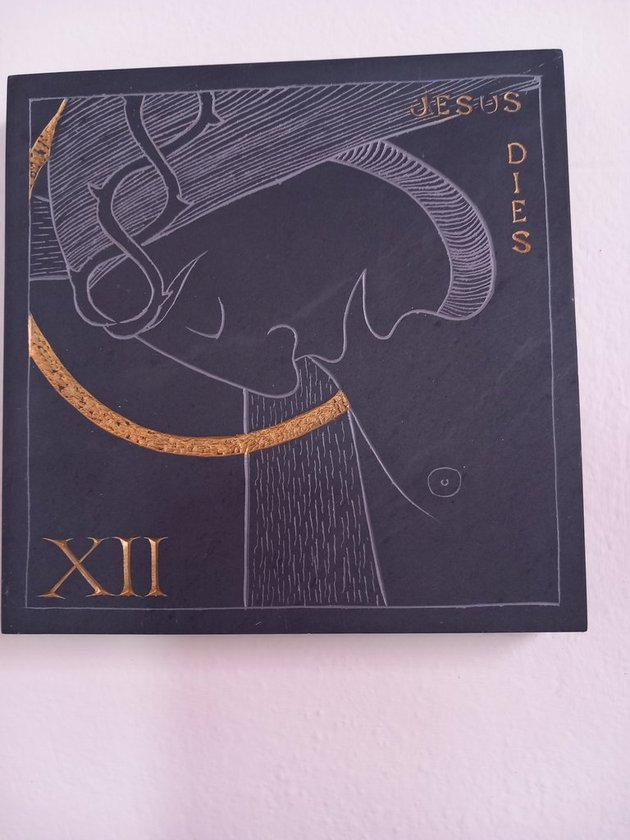
Stations of the Cross #12 - Jesus dies on the cross

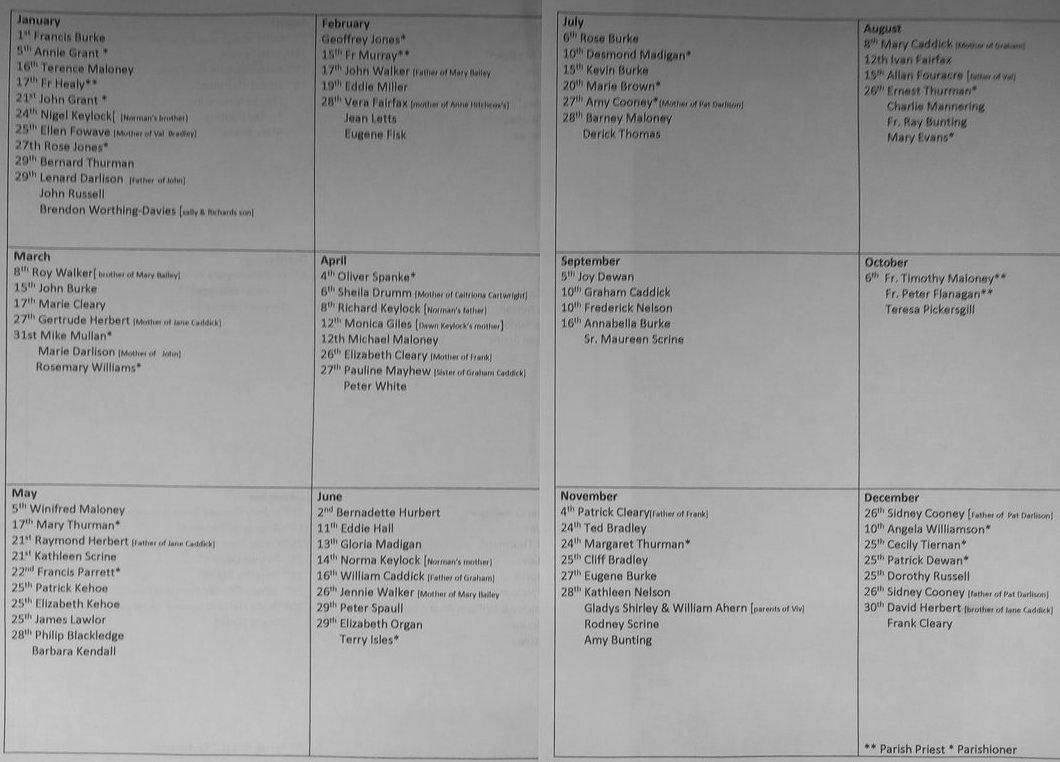
"Christ of compassion, you enable us to be in communion with those who have gone before us" - Brother Roger of Taize

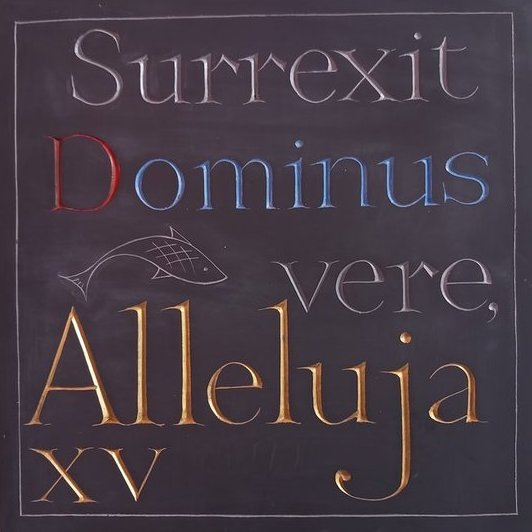
The Resurrection of Jesus - Praise the Lord! Alleluia.

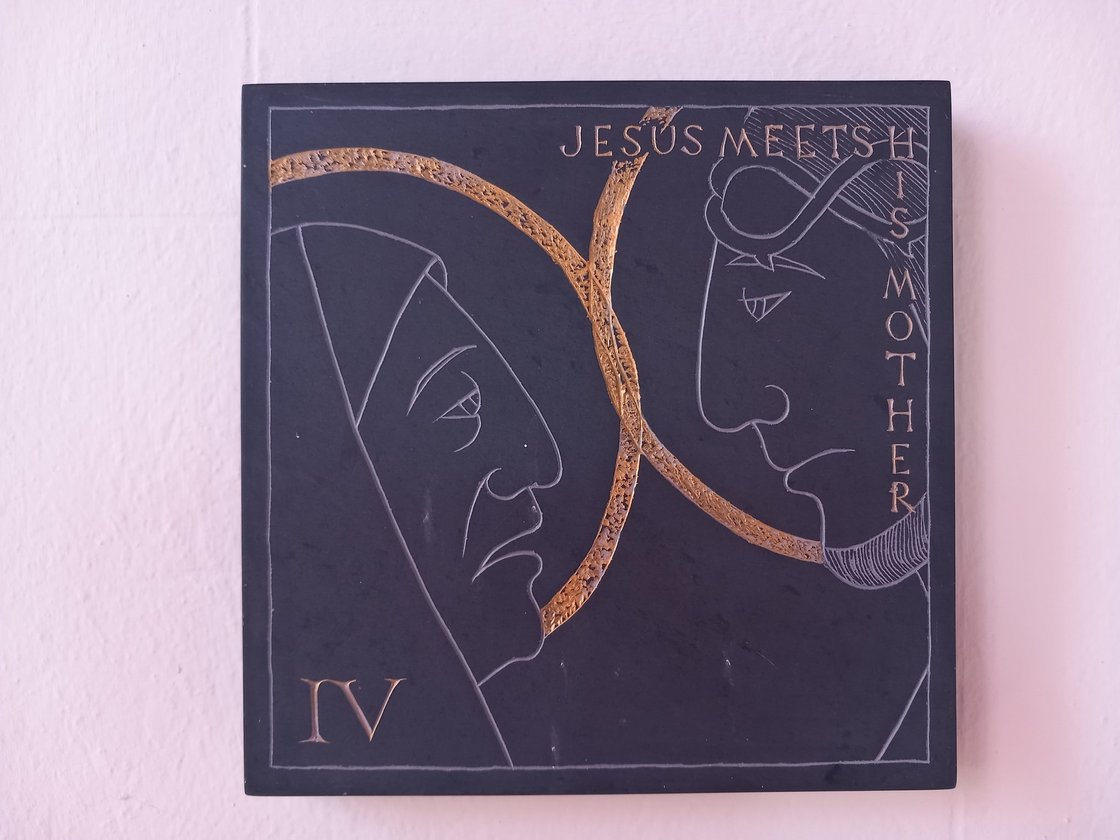
Stations of the Cross #4 - Jesus meets His Mother

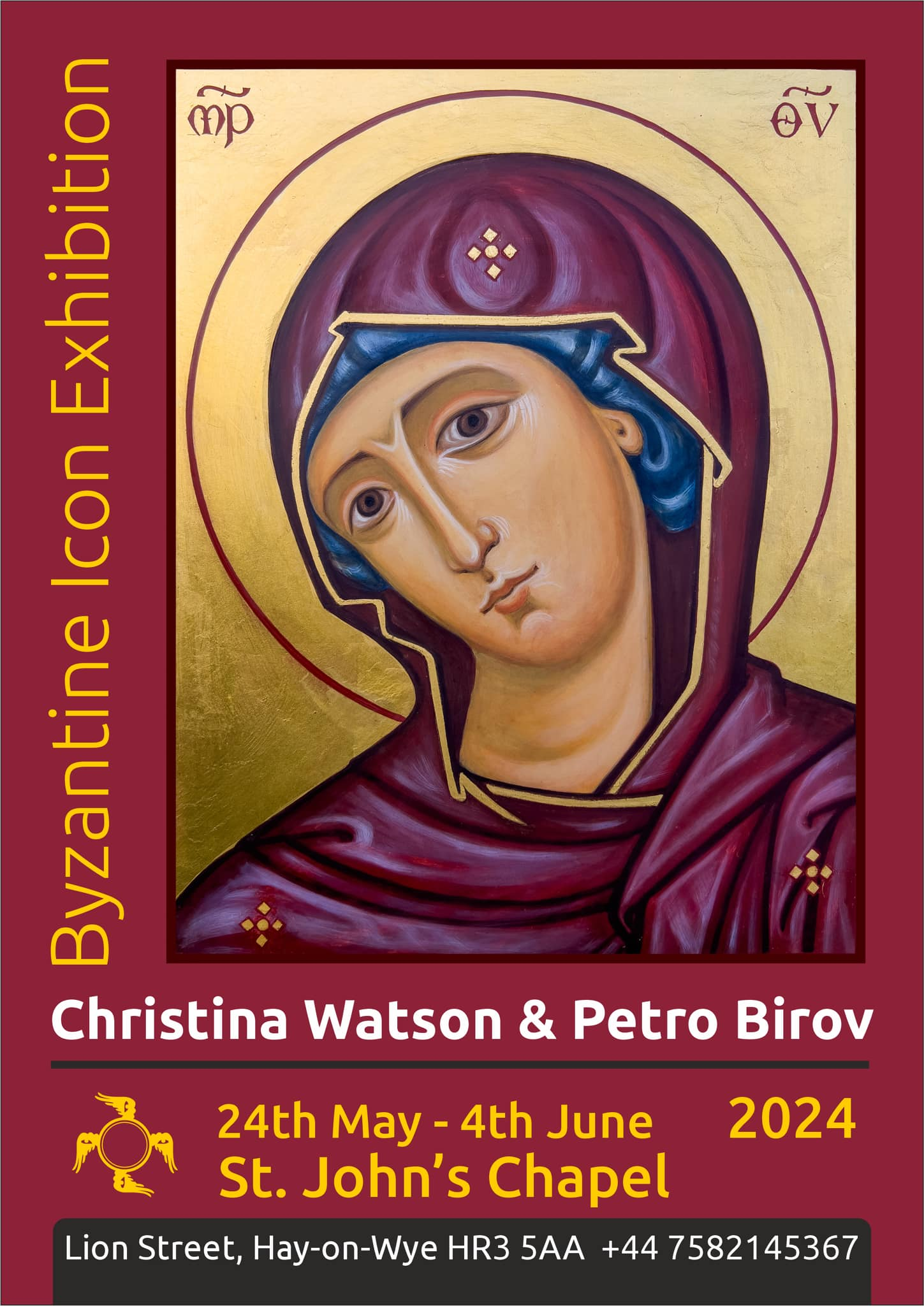
Petro's Ukrainian family are a blessing to our community

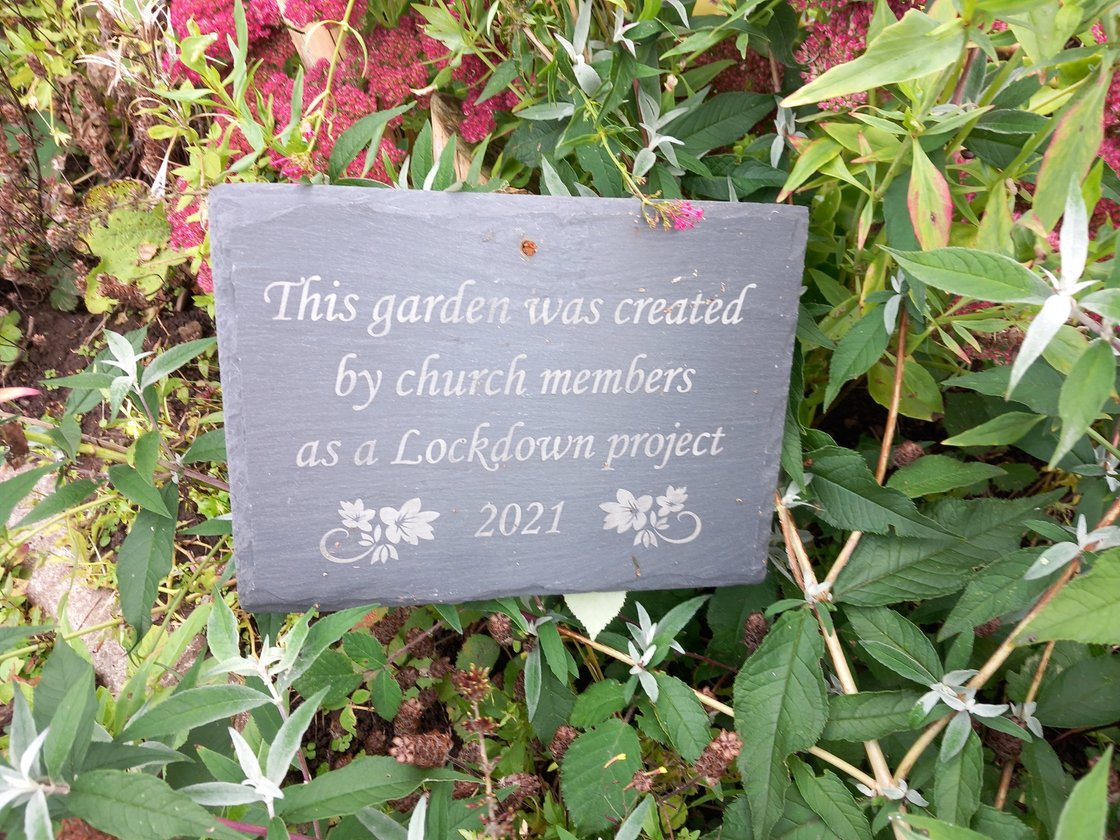
Lockdown garden created by Maggie Sims - RIP

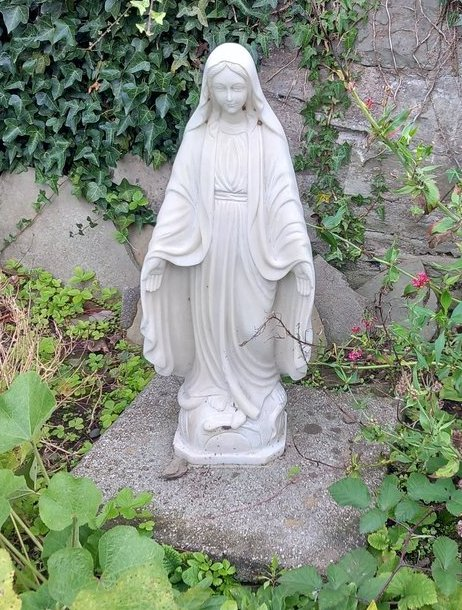
Lockdown garden is dedicated to Our Lady

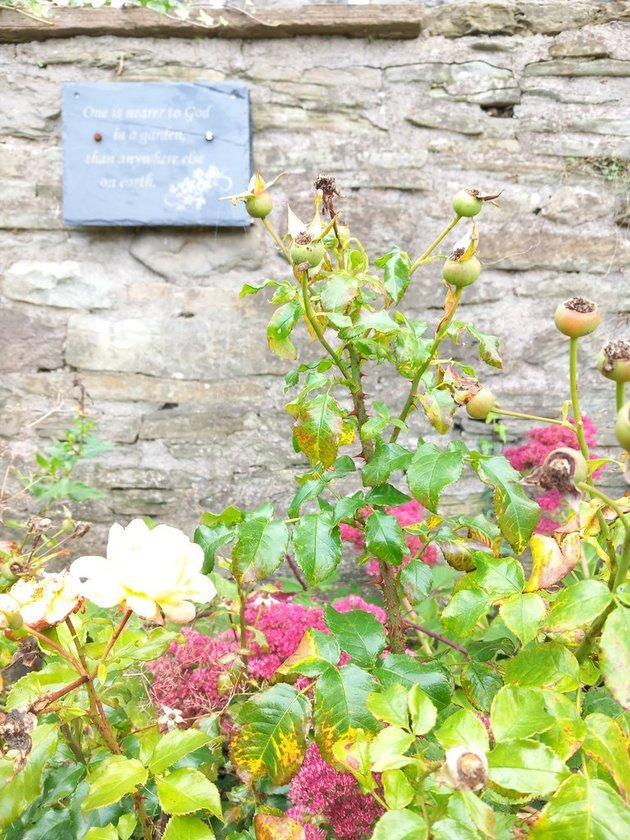
"One is nearer to God in a garden than anywhere else on earth" - Dorothy Frances Blomfield

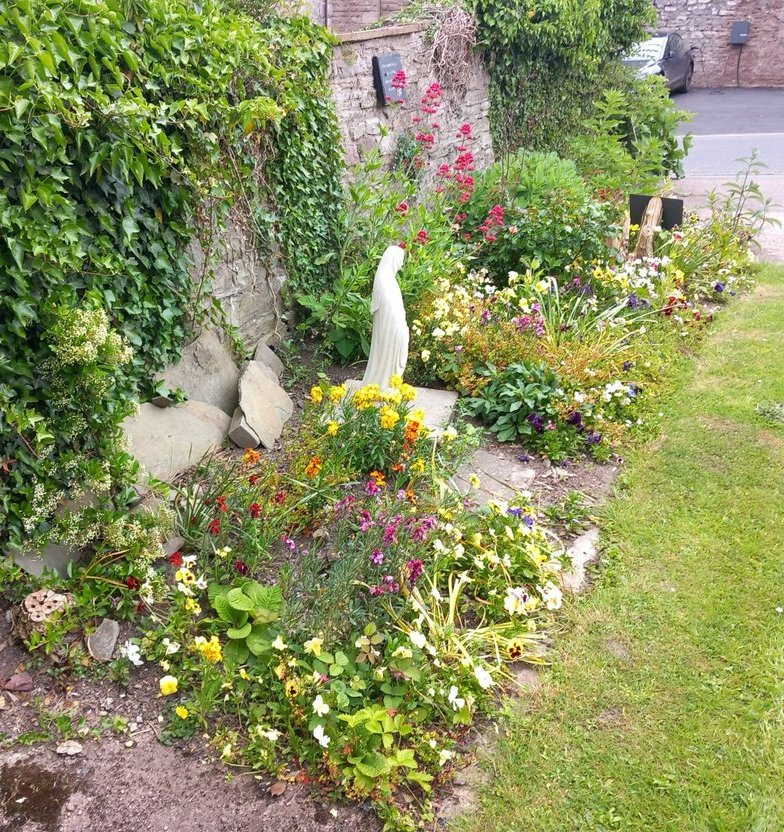
Lockdown garden

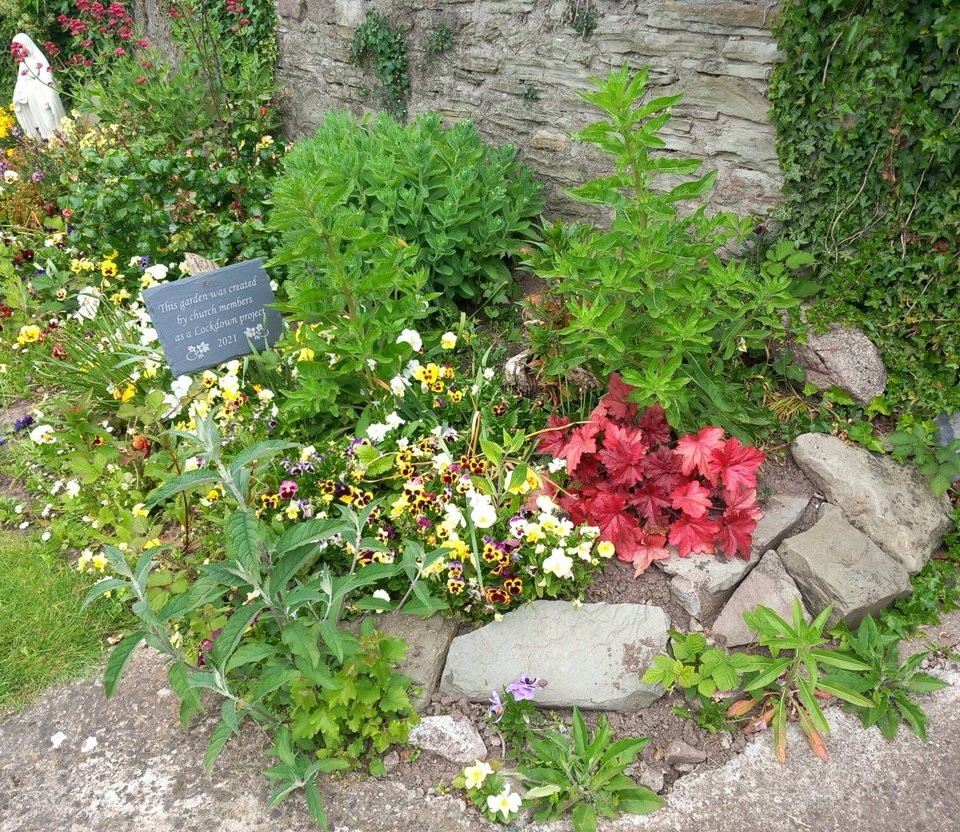
Lockdown garden

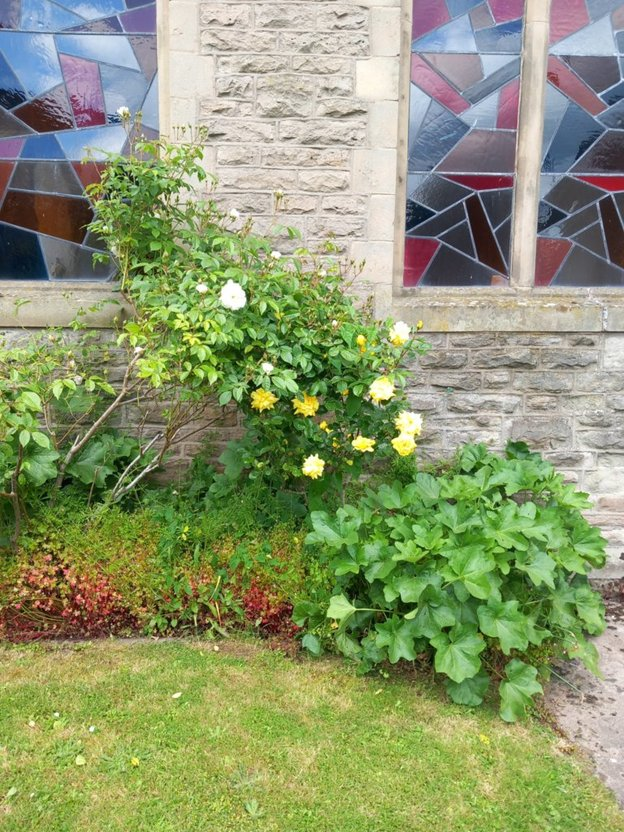
Roses and hollyhocks flower bed

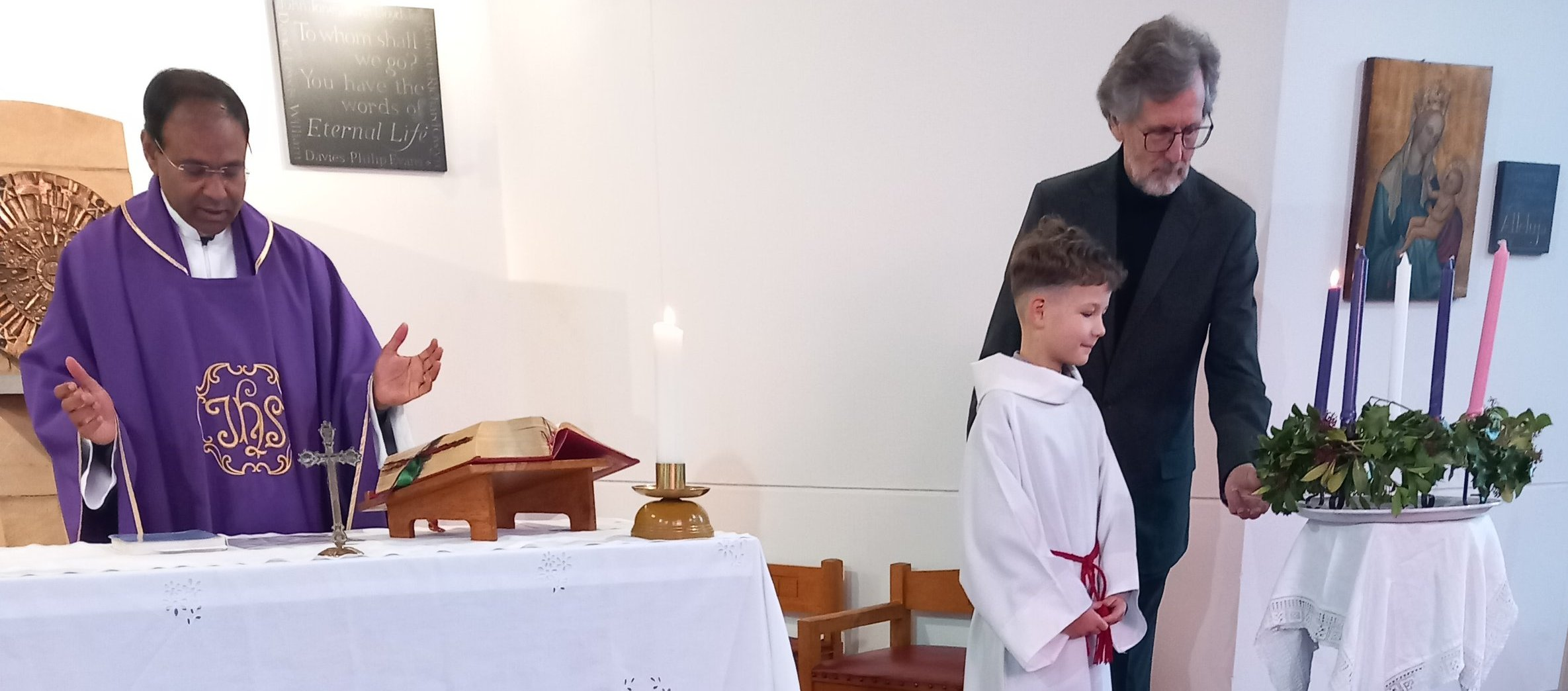
1st Sunday of Advent 2024: New liturgical year, new lectionary & new altar server: Dan

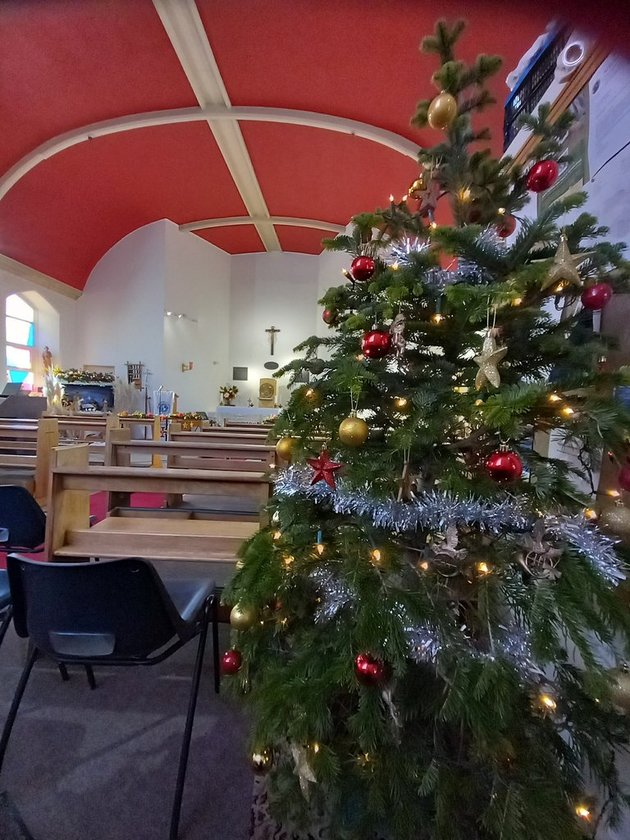
Christmas tree donated annually by the O'Reillys

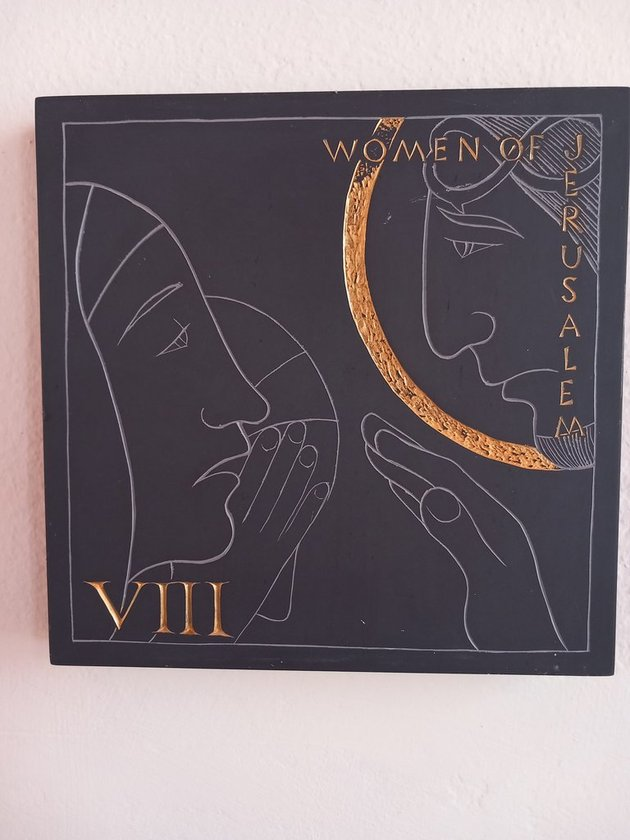
Stations of the Cross #8 - Jesus meets the women of Jerusalem

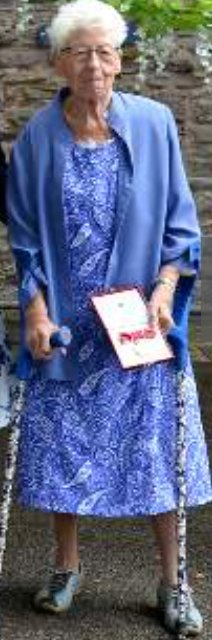
Maggie Sims BEM, much loved and missed parishioner

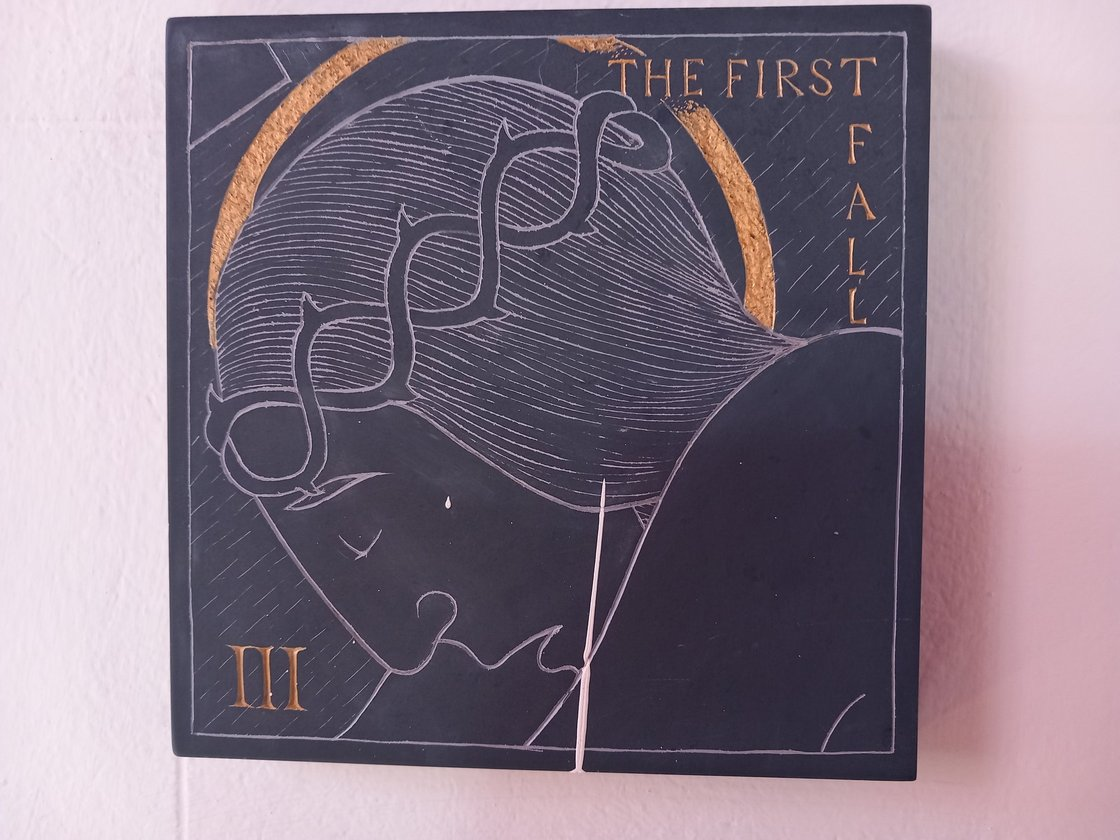
Stations of the Cross #3 - Jesus falls the first time

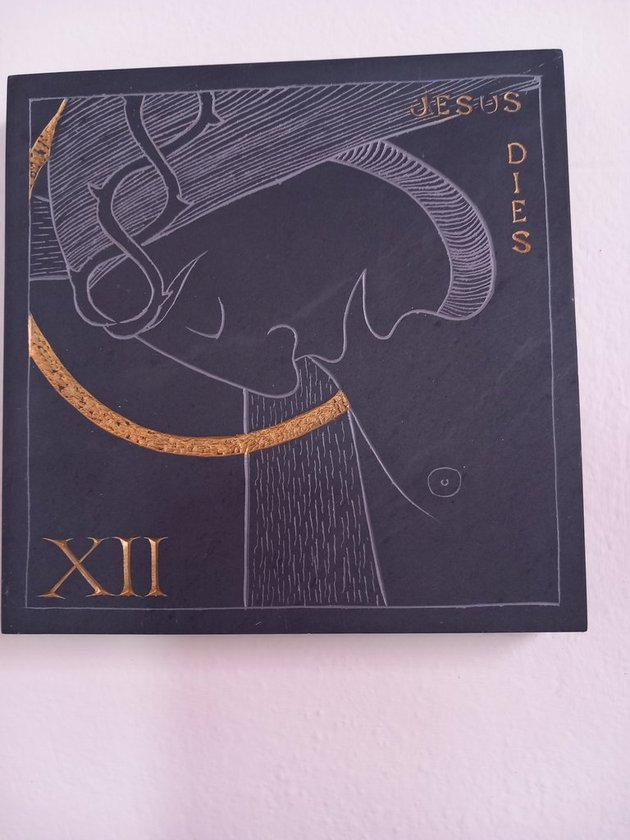
Stations of the Cross #12 - Jesus falls the second time

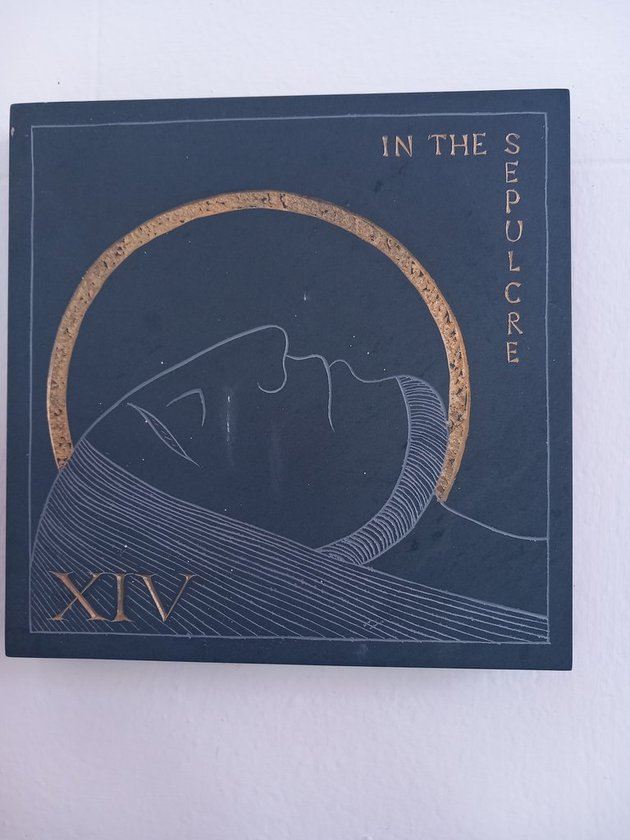
Stations of the Cross #9 - Jesus falls a third time

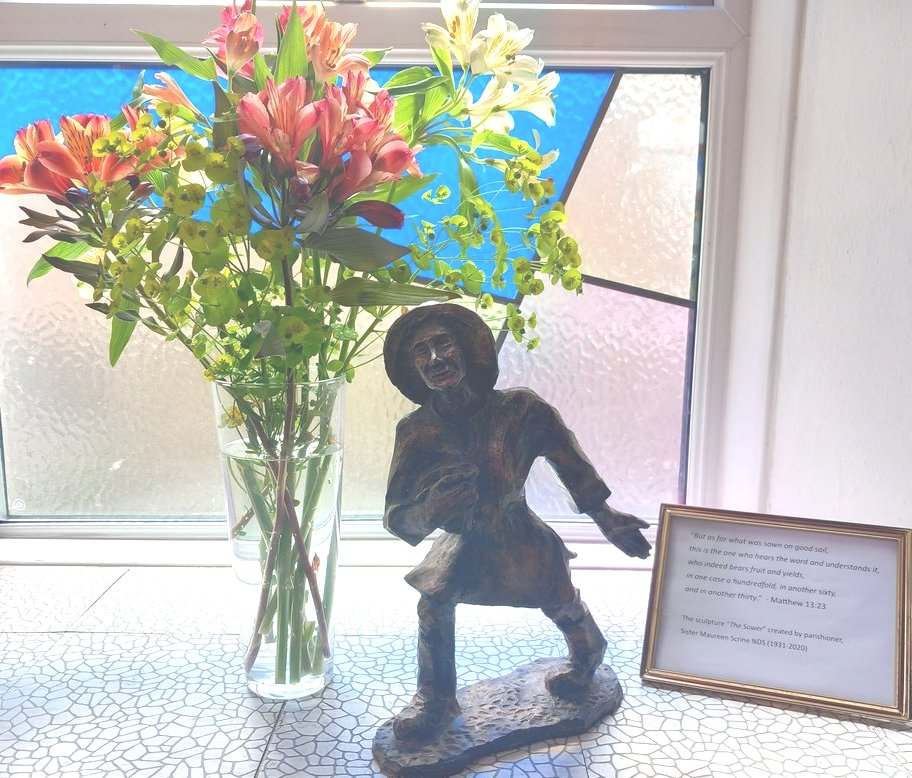
The Sower, the work of parishioner Sister Maureen Scrine NDS (1931–2020)

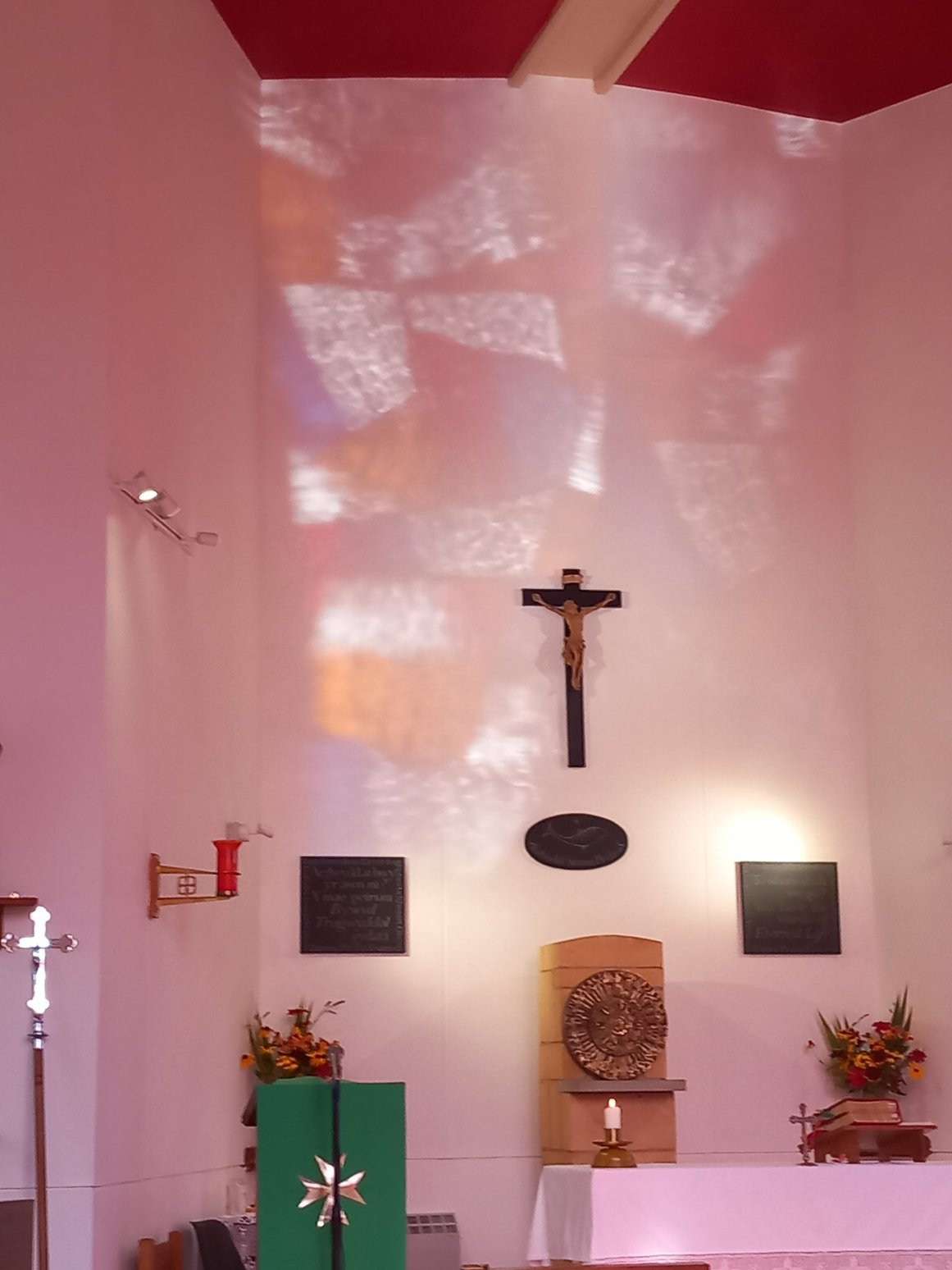
Camera obscura

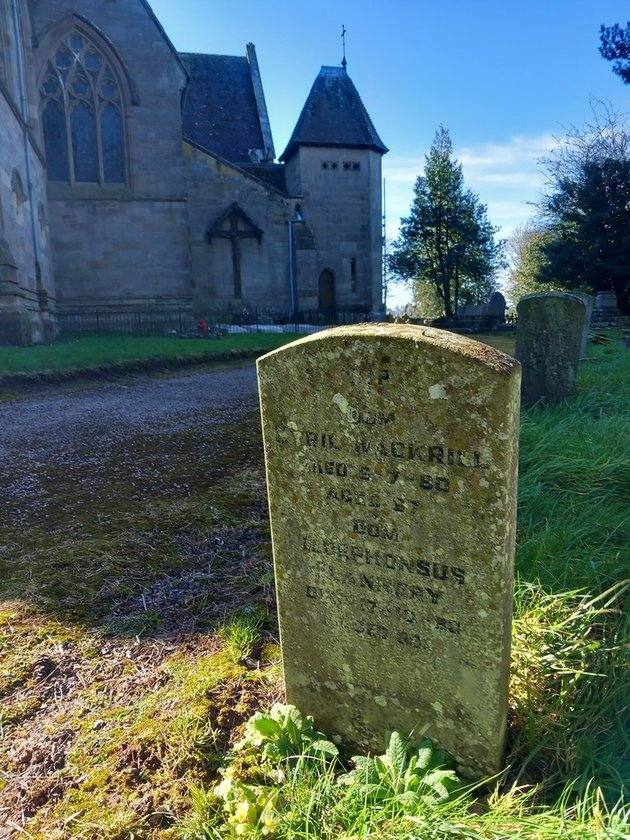
Fr. Flannery's grave in Belmont Abbey, on the right, near the graveyard entrance

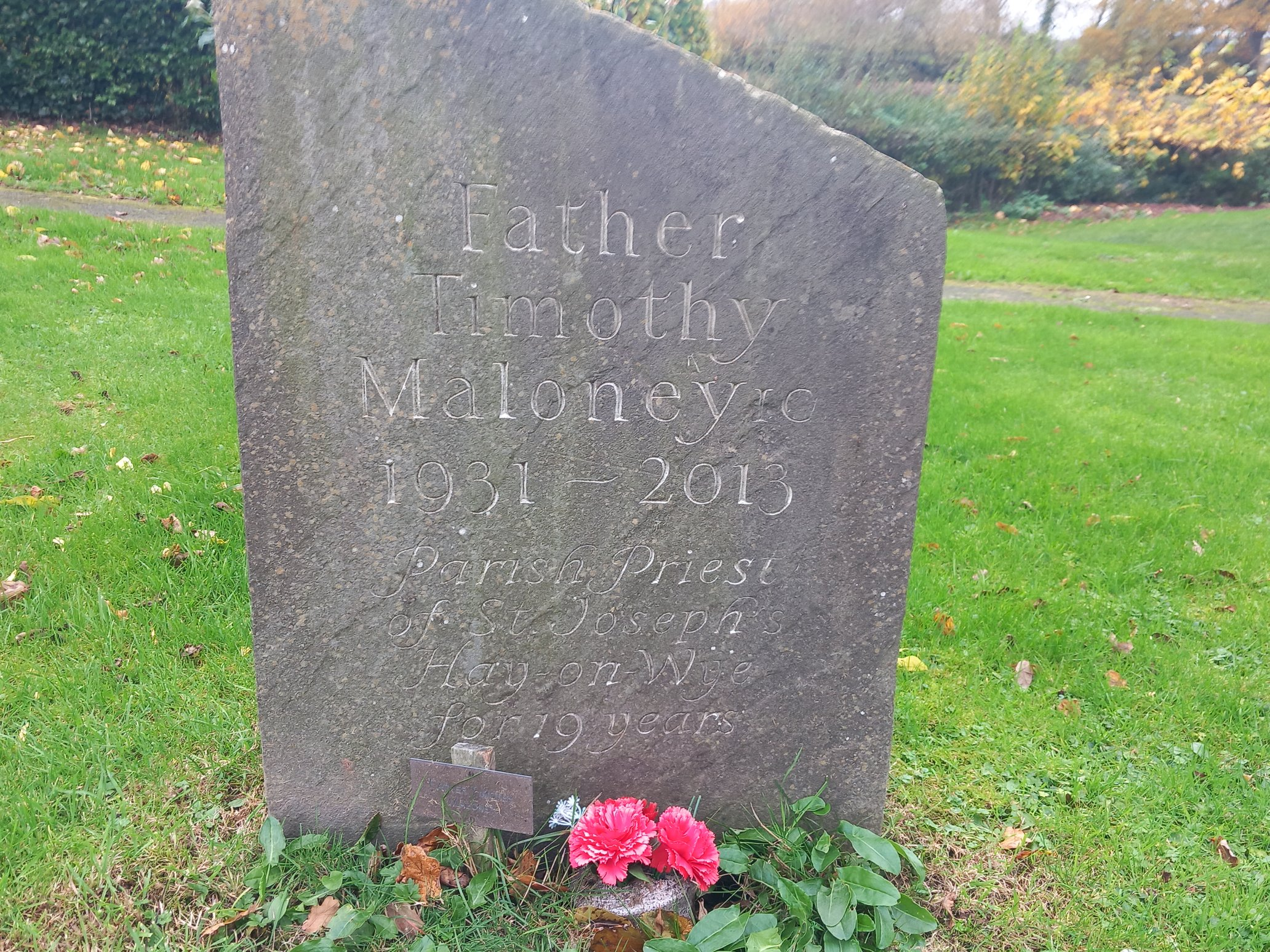
Fr Maloney's grave in Hay-on-Wye cemetery - follow central path to last grassed area, grave on the right.

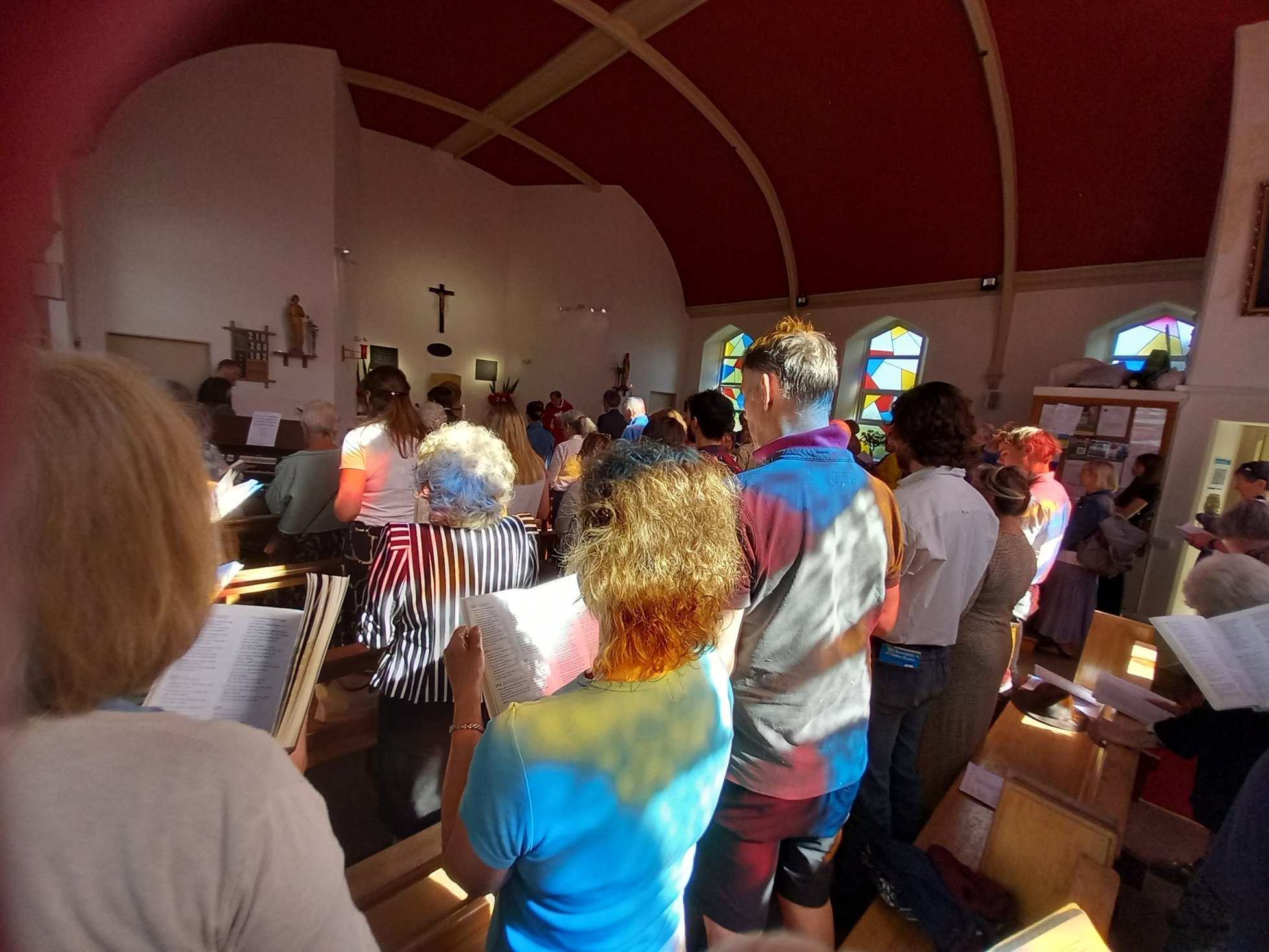
The stained-glass windows create stunning visual effects within the church.

Sacrament of Baptism - Ifor Gwilliam McNamara, Oct 2026.
