= Spanish Company =

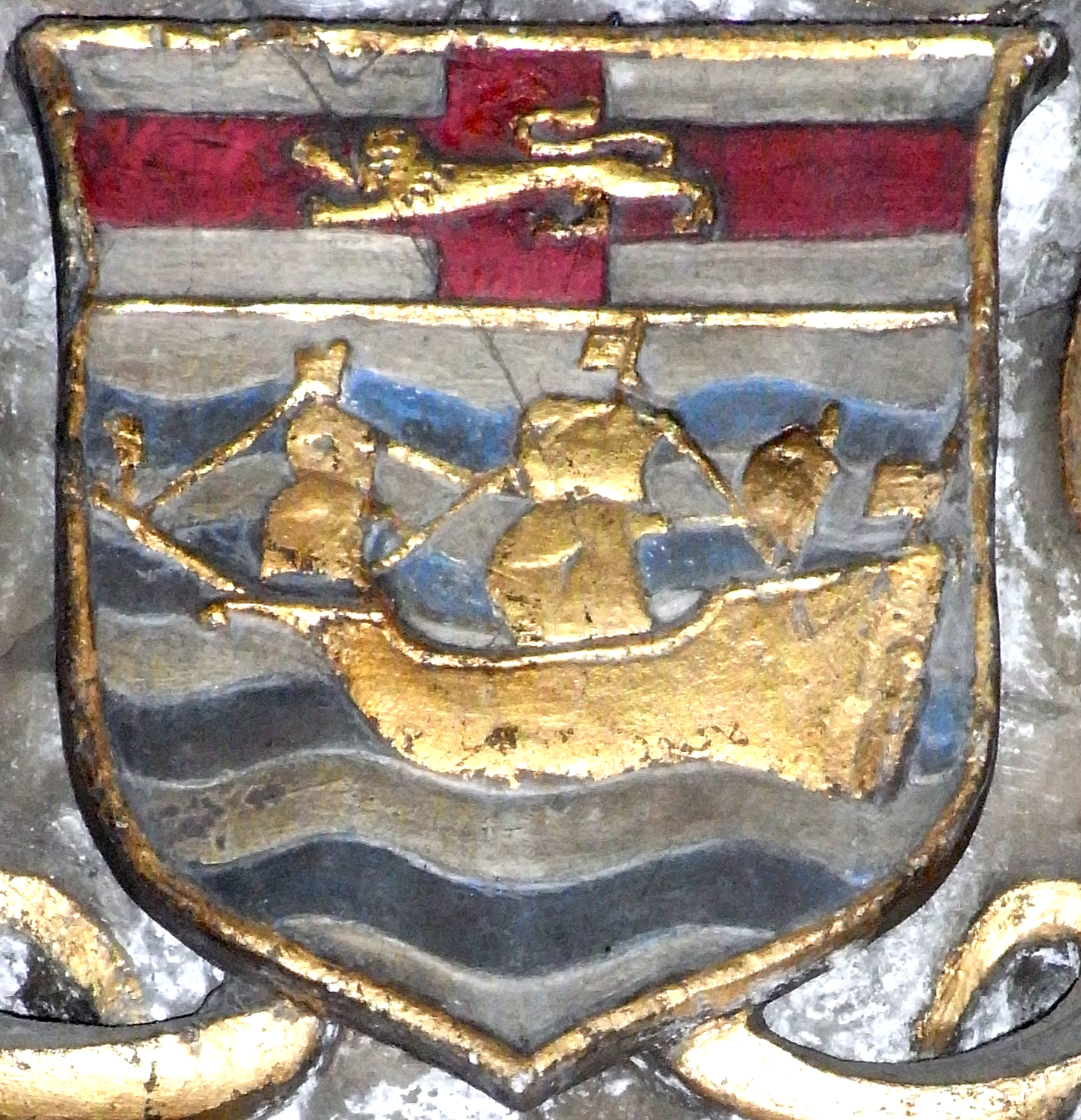
Arms of the Spanish Company: Azure in base a sea, with a dolphin's head appearing in the water all proper, on the sea a ship of three masts, in full sail, all or, the sail and rigging argent, on each a cross gules, in the dexter chief point the sun in splendour, in the sinister chief point an estoile of the third; on a chief of the fourth, a cross of the fifth, charged with the lion of England (as recorded in the College of Arms). This version, differing slightly from the official blazon, is from the mural monument to Richard Beaple (died 1643), thrice Mayor of Barnstaple, St Peter's Church, Barnstaple, Devon

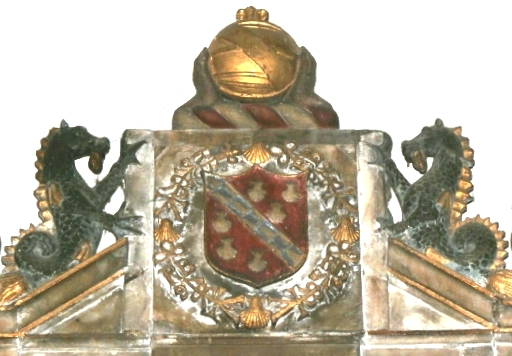
Heraldic achievement of Richard Beaple (d.1643), thrice Mayor of Barnstaple, detail from his monument in St Peter's Church, Barnstaple, Devon. The central escutcheon shows his family arms: Gules, a bend vair between six escallops or. The supporters and crest are those of the Spanish Company, the armorials of which are shown elsewhere on his monument. Crest: On a wreath of the colours, two arms embowed issuing out of clouds all proper, holding in the hands a globe or; Supporters: Two sea horses argent, finned or

The Spanish Company was an English chartered company or corporate body established in 1530, and 1577, confirmed in 1604, and re-established in 1605 as President, Assistants and Fellowship of Merchants of England trading into Spain and Portugal, whose purpose was the facilitation and control of English trade between England and Spain through the establishment of a corporate monopoly of approved merchants.

== History ==
The Company was established by various charters as follows:

- 1530 Charter granted by King Henry VIII dated 1 September 1530
- 1577 Charter granted by Queen Elizabeth I dated 8 June 1577
- 1604 Charter of Confirmation granted by King James I dated 30 March 1604, following cessation of hostilities in the Anglo-Spanish War (1585–1604), but before the Treaty of London (1604) was signed; it was later determined to contain "divers misprisions and imperfections".
- 1605 Charter granted by King James I dated 31 May 1605, to supersede the imperfect charter of 1604.

== Founding Members, 1605 ==
The 557 founding members of the 1605 incorporation named in the charter consisted of two distinct groups, firstly of 25 nobles, royal officials and knights and then of 532 merchants from 16 named English ports and towns. Richard Langley of the City of London was named in the 1605 Secretary for life.

=== Nobles and royal officials ===
The 25 nobles, royal officials and knights named as founding members were as follows:

- Thomas Sackville, 1st Earl of Dorset (1527–1608), Lord Treasurer of England,
- Charles Howard, 1st Earl of Nottingham (1536–1624), Lord Admiral of England,
- Charles Blount, 8th Baron Mountjoy, 1st Earl of Devon (1563–1606)
- Henry Howard, 1st Earl of Northampton (1540–1614), Lord Warden of the Cinque Ports,
- Robert Cecil, 1st Earl of Salisbury, KG PC (c.1563-1612), Principal Secretary to the King
- Sir Thomas Flemyng (1544–1613), knight, Chief Baron of the Exchequer,
- Sir Edward Coke (1552–1634), knight, Attorney General,
- Sir Daniel Dunne (died 1617), knight, a Masters of Royal Requests,
- Sir William Waad, knight, Sir Thomas Smythe, knight, Sir Thomas Edmonds knight, Clerks of the Privy Council
- Sir Thomas Lake, knight, a Clerk of the Signet
- Sir Richard Martin, Sir John Spencer, Sir Thomas Smyth, Sir Robert Lee, Sir John Watts, Sir Thomas Cambell, Sir Christopher Hoddesden, Sir John Swynerton, Sir William Romeney, Sir Henry Sackford, Sir Thomas Pullison, Sir William Bond and Sir Samuel Saltonstall, knights.

=== Ports & towns of origin of merchant members ===
Merchants named as founding members were from the following English ports and towns (number of members in brackets), in order listed in the charter:

- City of London (224)
- Bristol (97)
- Exeter, Devon (45)
- Bridgwater, Somerset (11)
- Yarmouth, Norfolk (2)
- Chester (4)
- Plymouth, Devon (12), including Sir Richard Hawkins
- Kingston-upon-Hull (7)
- Tiverton, Devon (14)
- Taunton, Somerset (11)
- Chard, Somerset (13)
- Totnes, Devon (11)
- Lyme, Dorset (14)
- Barnstaple, Devon (12)
- Southampton, Hampshire (8)
- Ipswich, Suffolk (15)

== 1605 Charter ==
The key passage in the 1605 royal charter of King James I which re-established the company is as follows:

"And for that divers persons our subjects being not brought up in merchandise or use of traffic, but altogether ignorant and inexpert as well in the order and rules of merchandise as in the laws and customs of the realms of Spain and Portugal, and in the customs, usages, tolls and values of moneys, weights and measures, and in all other things belonging to merchandise very necessary, through their ignorance and lack of knowledge do commit many inconveniences and absurdities (as we are informed) to the offence of us and our dear brother the king of Spain, we willing to prevent and meet with such inconveniences and intending to further and help the expert and exercised merchants in their lawful and honest trade, and to establish good order and government in the said trade, of our ample and abundant grace do grant unto the president, assistants and fellowship of merchants that they, and such only as be or shall be of this incorporation or free of this fellowship, shall enjoy the whole entire and only trade and traffic and the whole entire and only liberty, use and privilege of trading and trafficking and using the feat and trade of merchandise, by and through all the parts of Spain and Portugal, from the town of Fuenterrabia in the kingdom or province of Biscay along the coast of Spain or Portugal or either of them unto Barcelona and in all the islands adjoining or appertaining to the said realms, towards the south or west part thereof. And therefore we command all the subjects of us, our heirs and successors, of what degree or quality soever they be, that none of them directly or indirectly do visit haunt frequent or trade, traffic or adventure by way of merchandise into or from any the parts of Spain or Portugal or either of them from the town of Fuenterrabia unto Barcelona, neither within any islands adjoining or appertaining to the said realms, towards the south or west part thereof, other than the president, assistants and fellowship and such particular persons as be of that fellowship, their factors, agents, servants and assigns, upon pain not only to incur our indignation, but also to pay such pains and amercements and also to suffer imprisonment and other pains due to the transgressors of the statutes of the fellowship".

== Law-making powers ==
The 1605 charter gave the Company power to "make ordain and establish statutes, laws, constitutions and ordinances, so as the laws and constitutions be not contrary, repugnant or derogatory to any treaties, leagues, capitulations or covenants between us, our heirs and successors, and any other prince or potentate made or to be made, nor tending to the hindrance of the trade and traffic of any of the fellowship, behaving him or themselves duly and orderly as becometh good merchants of the fellowship, without any fraudulent or disordered attempts or practices, as well for the good rule and government of the president, assistants and fellowship as of all and singular other subjects of us, our heirs and successors intermeddling or by any means exercising merchandise, in the realms of Spain and Portugal".

== Taxation powers ==
The 1605 charter gave the Company power to tax merchandise both imported and exported by their members in such sum "as to them shall seem requisite and convenient for the common profit and sustentation of the necessary and reasonable stipend and other charges of the fellowship and corporation".

== Power to imprison ==
The 1605 charter gave the Company power to punish wrong-doers, to "chastise and correct by imprisonment or otherwise by fine, amercement or other reasonable punishment"

== Instructions to English ports ==
The 1605 charter forbade customs officers to allow export of goods to Spain or Portugal except by members of the Company: "We straightly charge and command all and singular customers, comptrollers and collectors of customs, poundage and subsidies, and all other officers within our port and city of London and elsewhere unto whom it shall appertain, that they their clerks or substitutes, shall not take entry of any goods wares or merchandises to be transported into Spain or Portugal, or make any agreement for any custom, poundage or other subsidy for any such goods, but only of such person and persons free of the fellowship by virtue of these our letters patents".

== Consuls and governors ==
The 1605 charter gave the Company power to establish its own consuls and governors within the area of trade in order to: "administer unto (members) full speedy and expedite justice in all and every their causes, plaints and contentions amongst them in the dominions of Spain and Portugal, and to pacify, decide and determine all and all manner of questions discords and strifes amongst them in any of the realms of Spain and Portugal, moved or to be moved, for the better government of the merchants in Spain and Portugal..."

== Armorials ==
The armorials of the Company were: Azure in base a sea, with a dolphin's head appearing in the water all proper, on the sea a ship of three masts, in full sail, all or, the sail and rigging argent, on each a cross gules, in the dexter chief point the sun in splendour, in the sinister chief point an estoile of the third; on a chief of the fourth, a cross of the fifth, charged with the lion of England. The crest was: On a wreath of the colours, two arms embowed issuing out of clouds all proper, holding in the hands a globe or The supporters were: Two seahorses argent, finned or.

== Sources ==
- Croft, Pauline. The Spanish Company. London Record Society. Volume 9. London. 1973.
