= Penrose's Almshouses =

Grade I listed almshouses in Barnstaple

Coordinates: 51°04′37″N 4°03′22″W

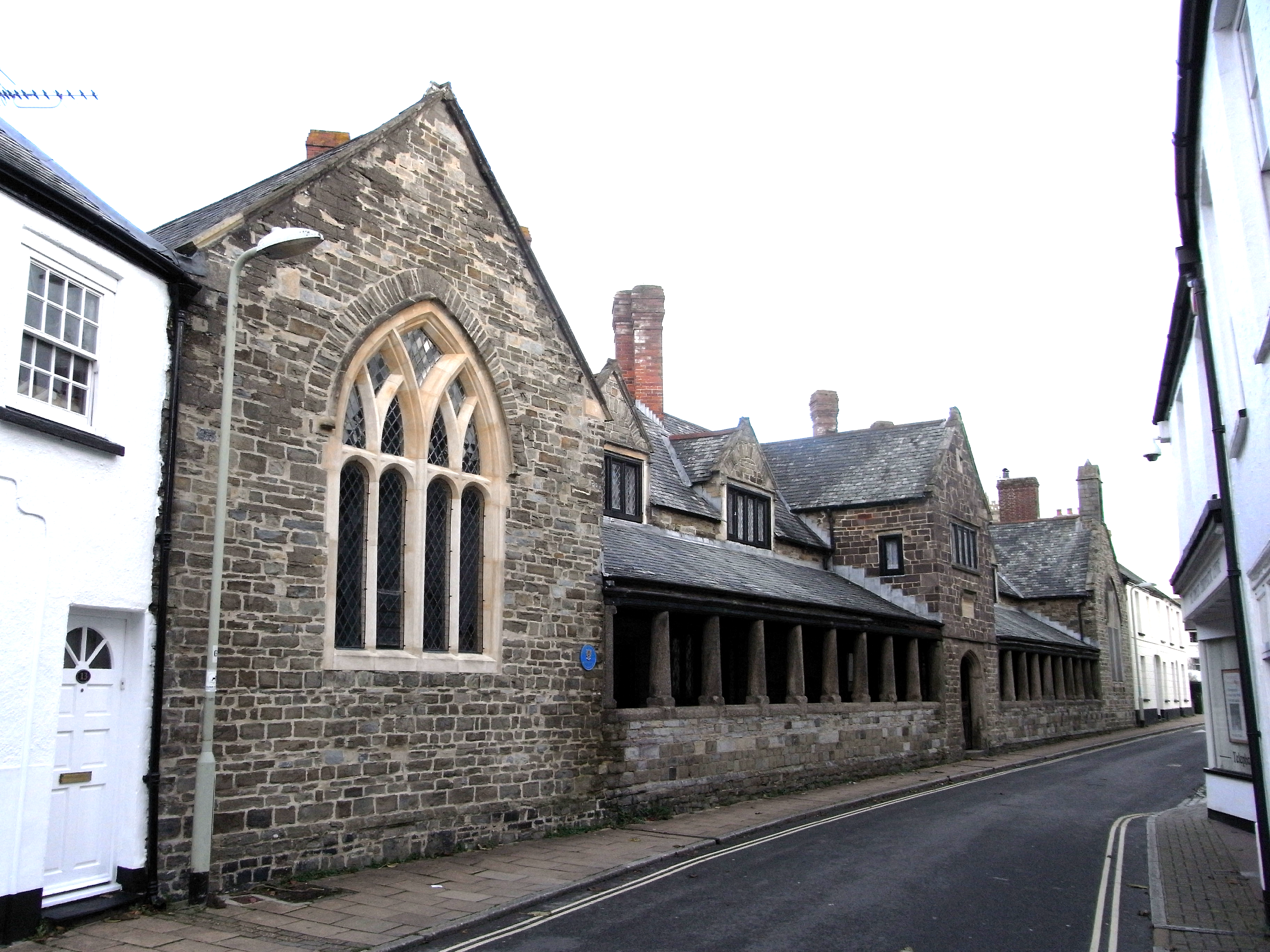
Penrose's Almshouses from Litchdon Street

Penrose's Almshouses are 17th-century almshouses in Litchdon Street, Barnstaple, in Devon, England, built in memory of John Penrose (1575–1624), a merchant and Mayor of Barnstaple. They have been a Grade I listed building since 1951.

== History ==
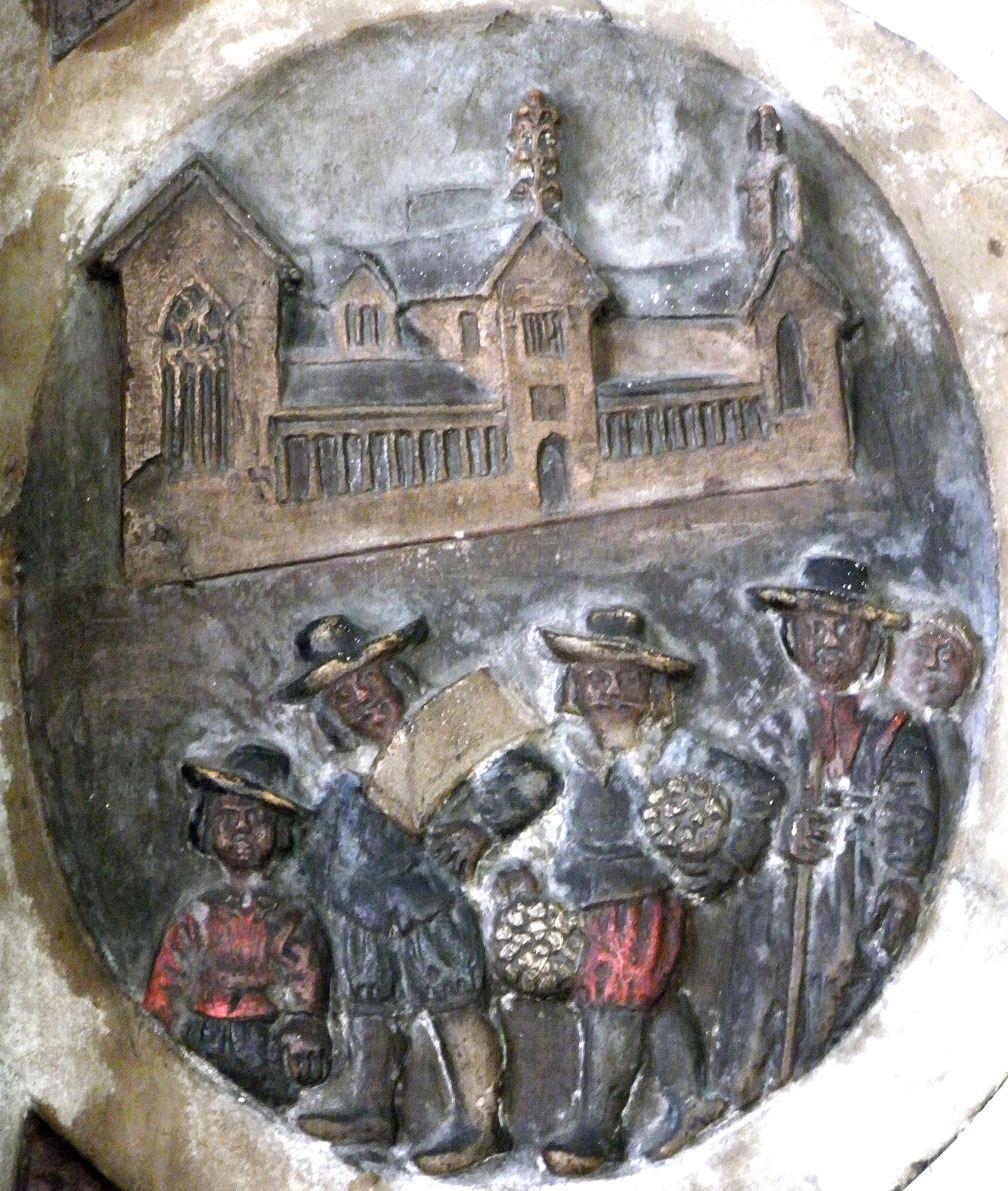
Depiction of Penrose's Almshouses on Beaple's monument

Between 1624 and 1627 Richard Beaple (1564-1643) and the four other co-executors of the will of his son-in-law John Penrose, Mayor of Barnstaple in 1620, built the large structure in Litchdon Street, Barnstaple, known today as Penrose's Almshouses. It consists of a cobbled courtyard around which are twenty almshouses, for forty poor residents, with chapel and board room and vegetable gardens behind. A small coloured relief-sculpted depiction of these almshouses with a group of four poor inmates (with a woman, perhaps a wife, behind), within a roundel survives on the right side of Richard Beaple's monument in St Peter's Church, to match one on the left side depicting a merchant pointing to a treasure chest with three sailing ships on the sea behind.

These almshouses were originally 20 dwellings, each one housing two people of the same sex. Above the doorway a plaque records "this howse was founded by Mr John Penrose, marchant, sometime maior of this towne. Ano Do 1627". John Penrose (1575–1624) was a dealer in woollen goods and was Mayor of Barnstaple in 1620.

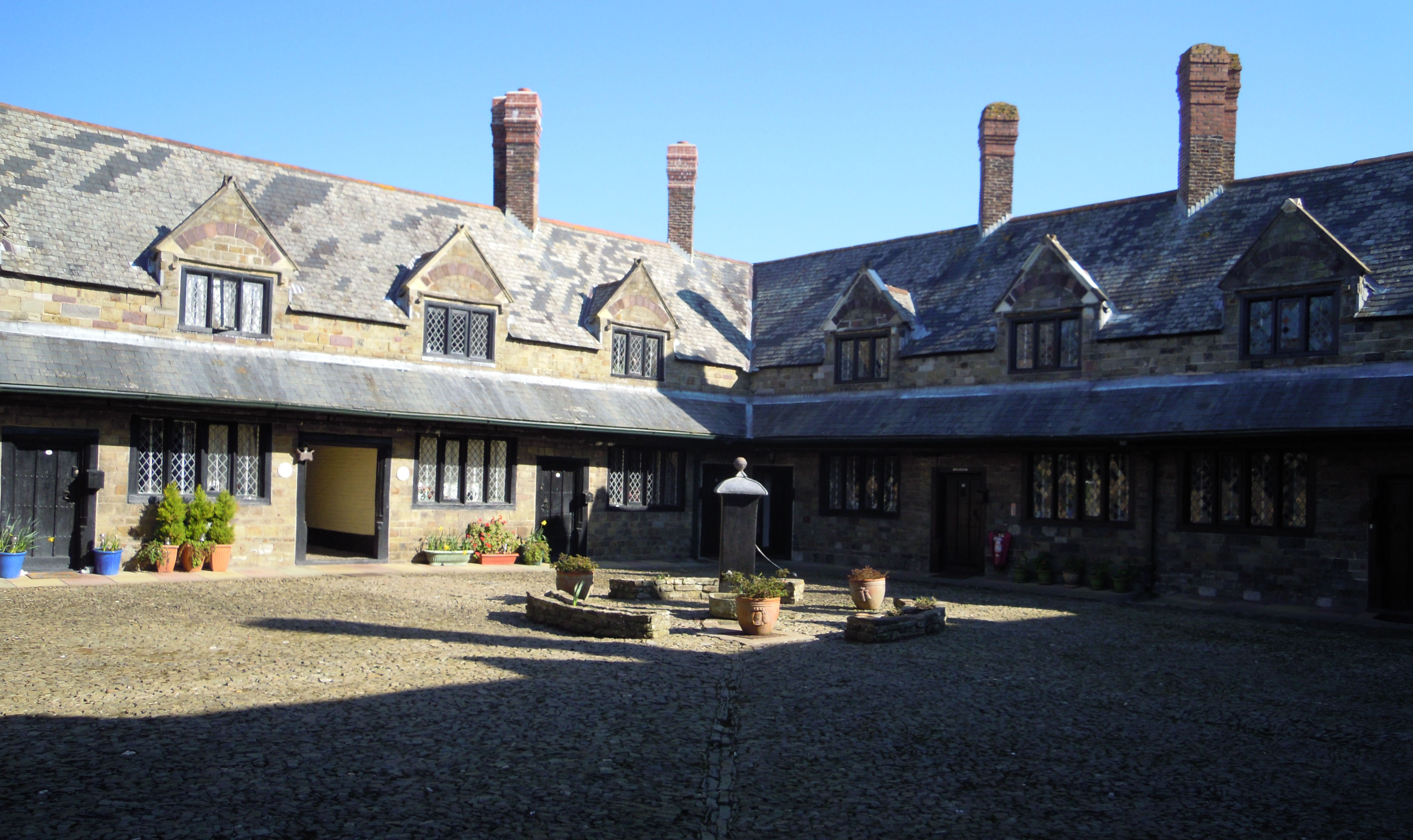
The courtyard with its listed pump

During the English Civil War Barnstaple changed hands four times, and signs of the skirmishes can still be seen at Penrose's Almshouses, where bullet holes can be found in the door to the far left of the entrance gate.

The pump in the courtyard has been Grade II listed since 1999. Probably dating to the late 17th or early 18th-century, it consists of a simple wooden casing shaped like a box, with a lead roof and an iron spout and handle. The 17th-century garden walls to the allotments at the rear of the almshouses have also been Grade II listed since 1999.

== Design ==
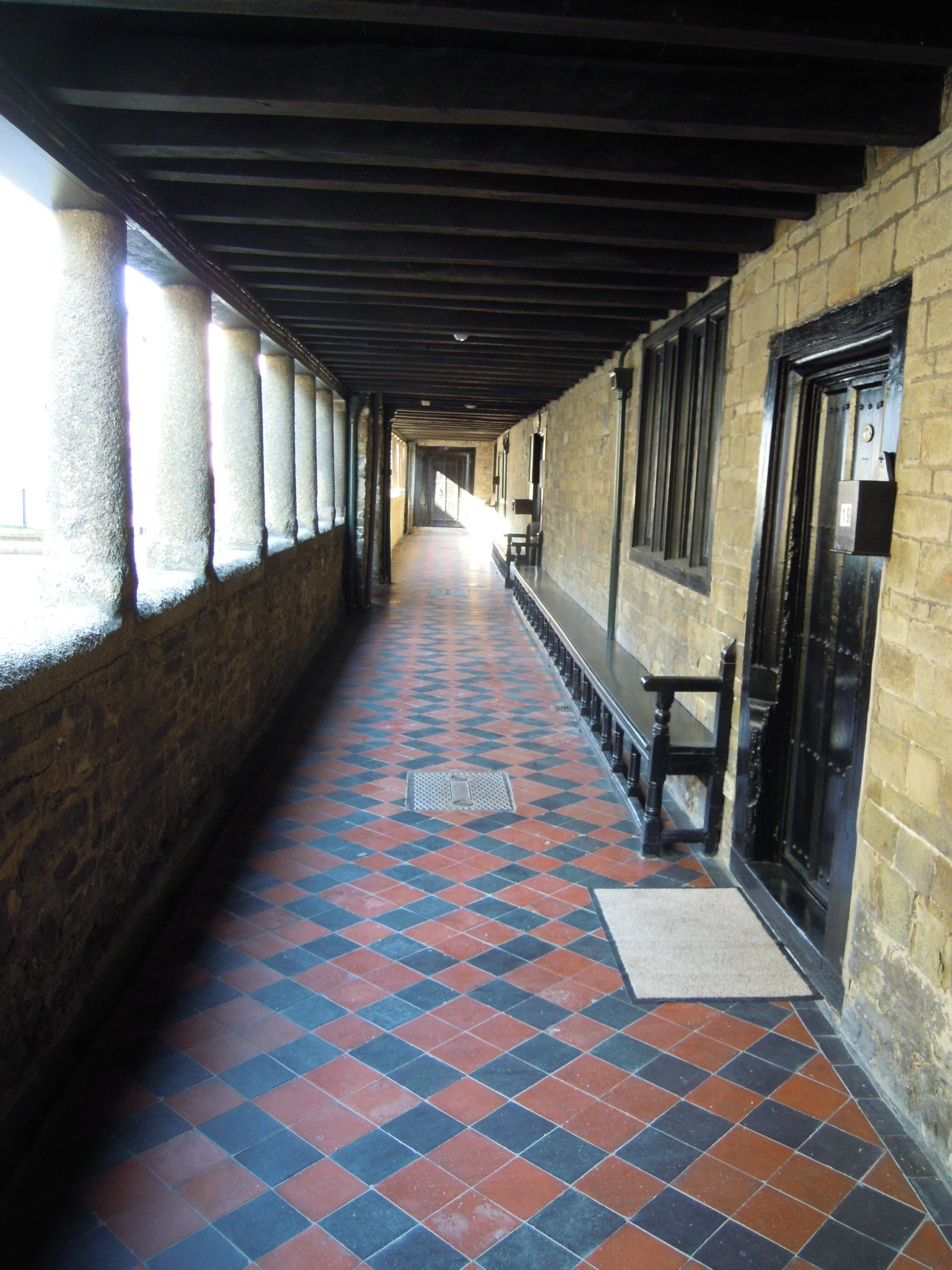
Inside the colonnade

Founded in 1627, the almshouses have an ambitious symmetrical front with projecting centre and corners. The receding parts have one-storeyed colonnades of roughly hewn circular granite pillars, the front of which are in line with the projecting parts. The latter are gabled. The doorway is four-centred, the side parts with large four-light "posthumously Perpendicular" windows. There is a spacious courtyard behind with four ranges of almshouses arranged facing onto a large courtyard, with a passageway through from the street and another at the rear, leading to allotments.

The chapel has a fine interior with a three-light east window and a shallow-coved plaster ceiling with the remains of 17th-century decorated plasterwork with a vine motif and a central pendant for a chandelier. The fittings include 17th-century bookrests and benches with some 19th-century panelling and a 19th-century lectern. The boardroom at the opposite side of the building has a 19th-century panelled dado with fitted drawers and an altered fireplace.

The interiors of the dwellings have been modernised, although it is possible some original features may survive beneath this work.
