= Thomas Horwood =

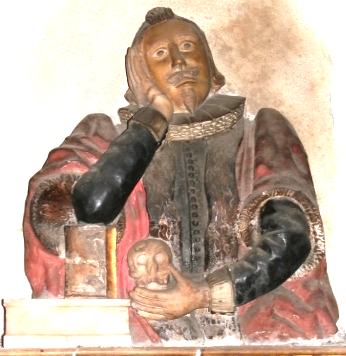
Thomas Horwood, detail from his Vanitas mural monument in St Peter's Church, Barnstaple

Thomas Horwood (1600-1658) of Barnstaple in Devon, was twice Mayor of Barnstaple, in 1640 and 1653. He founded an almshouse in Church Lane, Barnstaple. His mural monument survives in St Peter's Church, Barnstaple.

== Marriage ==
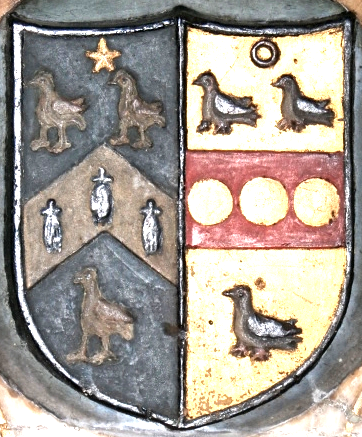
Arms of Thomas Horwood, detail from his mural monument in St Peter's Church, Barnstaple. Blazon: Sable, a chevron counter-ermine between three moorcocks or a mullet for difference (Horwood), impaling: Or, on a fesse between three martlets gules as many bezants an annulet for difference (wife's paternal arms, unknown family)

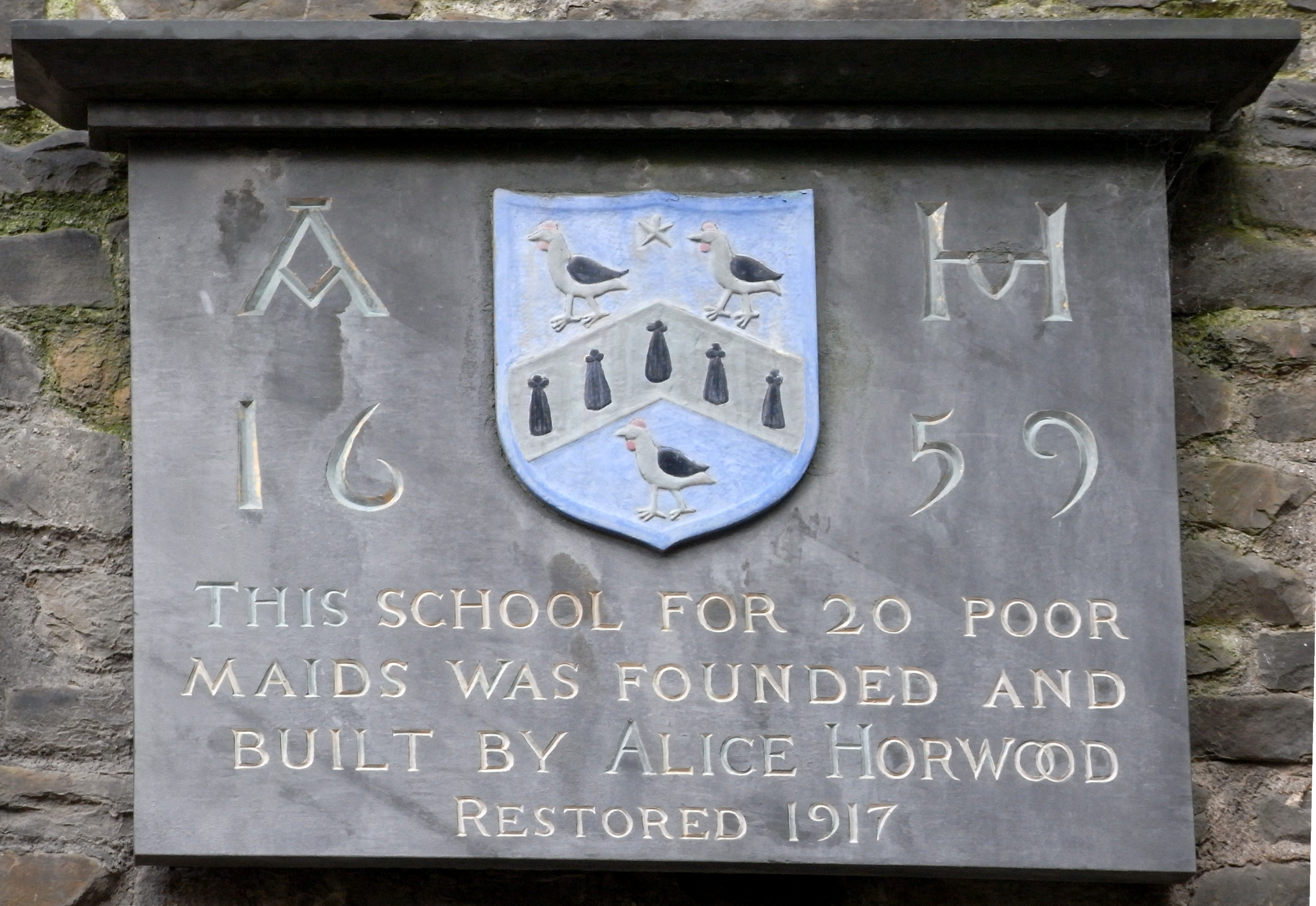
Slate tablet affixed to wall of Alice Horwood's School, now the "Old School Coffee Shop" in Church Lane, Barnstaple

He married a certain Alice, whose family is unknown, but whose paternal arms as shown on her husband's mural monument in St Peter's Church, Barnstaple were: Or, on a fesse between three martlets gules as many bezants an annulet for difference. In 1659, early in her widowhood, she founded a free school for "twenty poor maids", in Church Lane, Barnstaple, next to her husband's almshouse and today in use as a coffee-shop. A slate tablet affixed in 1917 above the entrance door of Alice Horwood's School, now the "Old School Coffee Shop" in Church Lane, Barnstaple, is inscribed: "A.H. 1659. This school for 20 poor maids was founded and built by Alice Horwood. Restored 1917", and shows the arms of Horwood: Azure, a chevron ermine between three moorcocks passant argent winged sable wattled gules in chief a mullet argent for difference. Adjoining Thomas Horwood's almshouse are "Paige's Almshouses", founded by his sister Elizabeth Horwood (Mrs Paige), sister-in-law of Gilbert I Paige (d.1647), twice Mayor of Barnstaple in 1629 and 1641.

== Founds almshouse ==
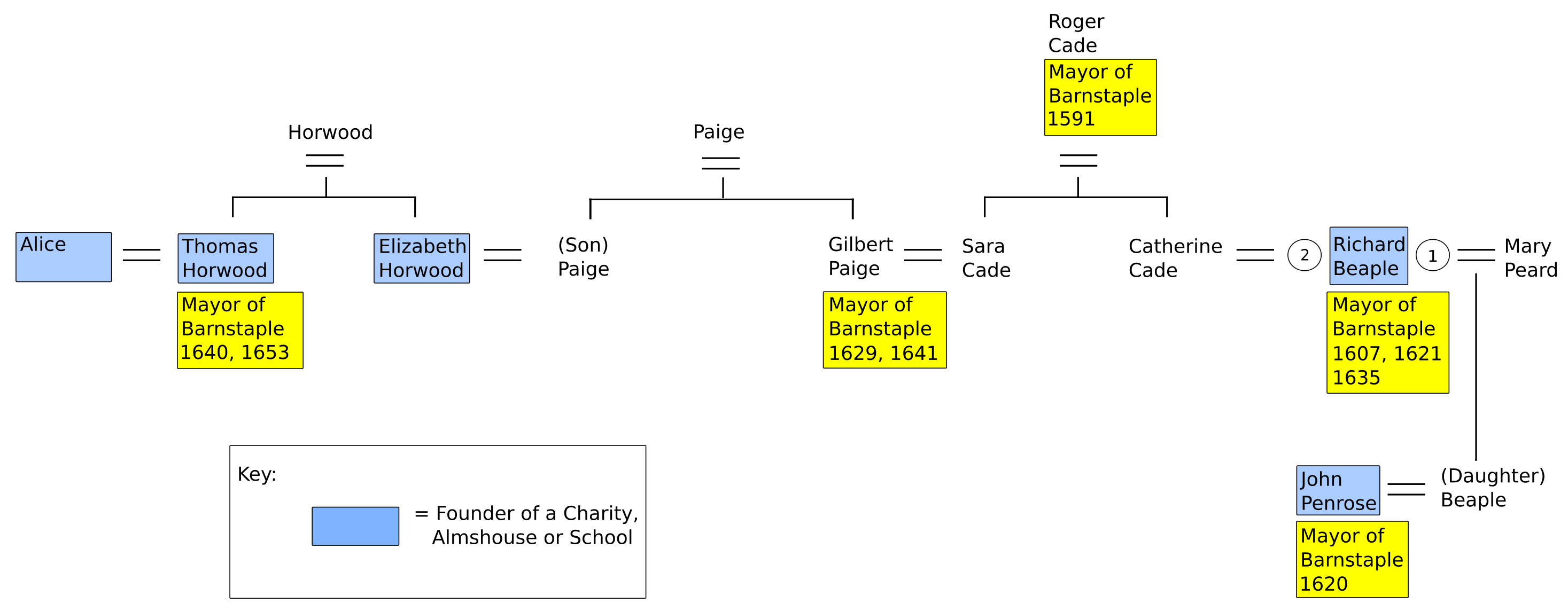
Diagram showing familial connections between the founders of the principal charities, almshouses and schools in or around the town of Barnstaple in the 17th century

He founded an almshouse in Church Lane, Barnstaple. A contemporary tablet above the front door survives inscribed as follows:

"This almshous was founded and endowed by the worshjpful Thomas Horwood, Merchant, twice mayor of this towne who was a worthy benefactor, and began it in his life, finished by his wife, Mrs Alice Horwood, after his death who of her owne accord added the adioyning free schoole and endowed it for 20 poore children for ever. 1659. Abi et tu fac similiter" (i.e. "go ye and do likewise")

== Monument in St Peter's Church ==
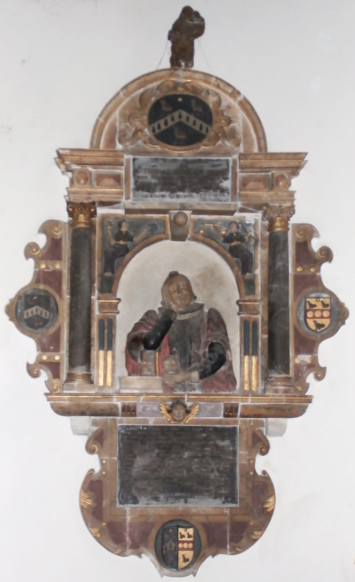
Mural monument to Thomas Horwood in St Peter's Church, Barnstaple

His mural monument which survives in St Peter's Church, Barnstaple, shows an effigy of the deceased seated under an arch, his right elbow propping up his head and his left hand holding a human skull, in the vanitas genre. In the spandrels of the arch are depicted female personifications of Prudentia (left) with her attributes of mirror and snake, and Justitia (right) with her balance and sword. It includes two tablets, the higher of which is inscribed as follows:

"To the memorie of M(aste)r Thomas Horwood, Merch^{t.} twice Maior of this towne, founder of ye almshous near ye church to w^{ch} M(ist)r(es)s Alice Horwood his relict added a free schoole & endowed it. Hee dyed June 1st 1658 aetat(is) 58".

The lower tablet is inscribed with the following verse:

"Sleeping a while in dust his body lies,
Who (living here) was taught the exercise,
Of Faith and Hope and Love the Graces Three
Wherin consisteth Christianitie.
His faith did eye the promise from above,
His hope the just performance, and his love -
Made haste to feast upon those Heavenly dishes
Which faith and hope presented to his wishes.
Thus all concurr'd and now though love alone
Possess those pleasures which attend the throne,
Yet neither Faith nor Hope doe thereby miss
Of their reward: seeing that very bliss
(W^{ch} Love enjoies); so lulleth them in peace
That though to act as formerly they cease,
Yet they are layd to rest in this condition:
That Faith to Vision turns, Hope to Fruition".
