= Dodderidgian Library =

Library in Barnstaple, England

Coordinates: 51°4′48.9″N 4°3′33.2″W

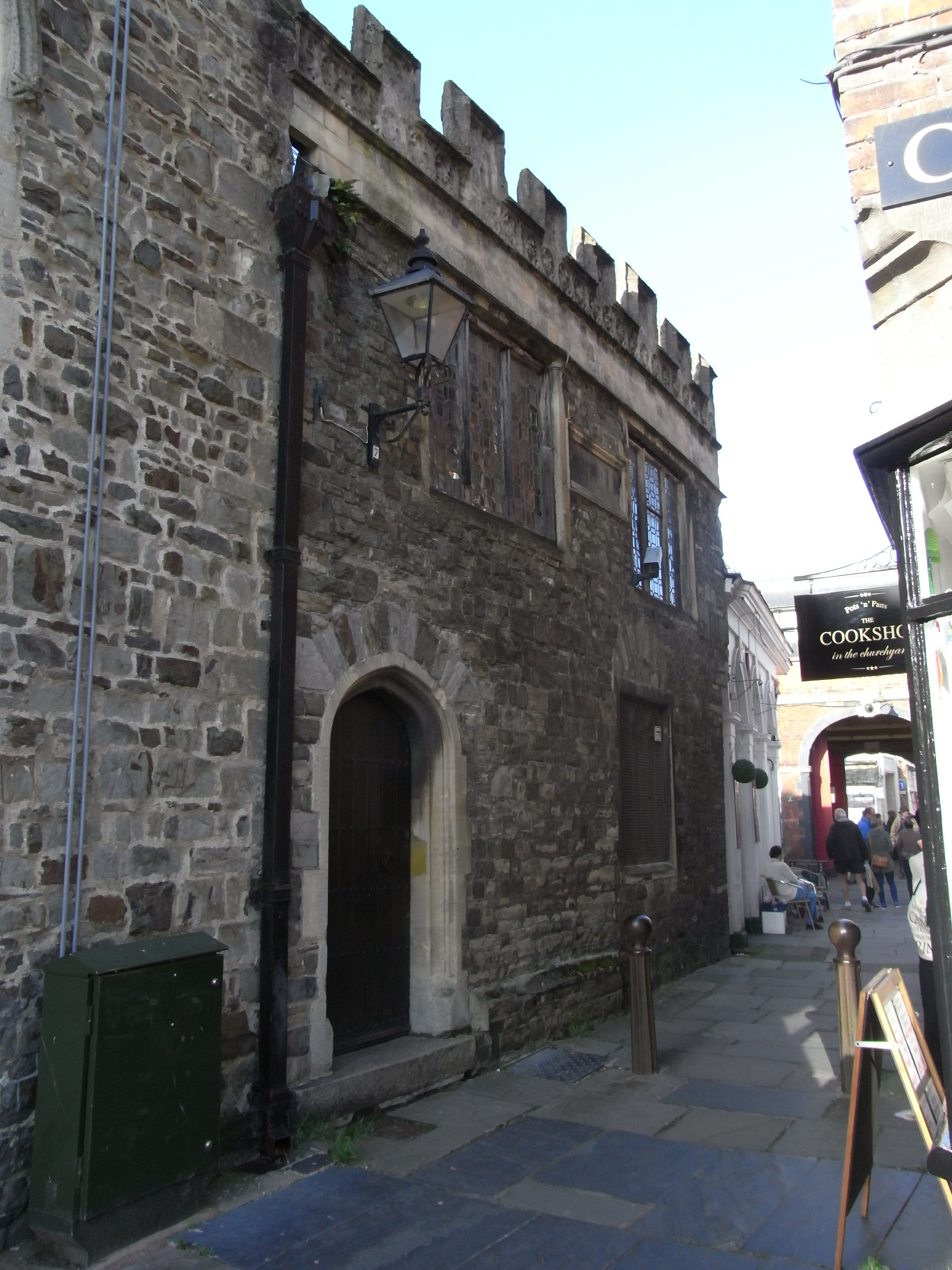
The Dodderidgian Library, Barnstaple. View looking northward along Church Walk towards Butchers Row

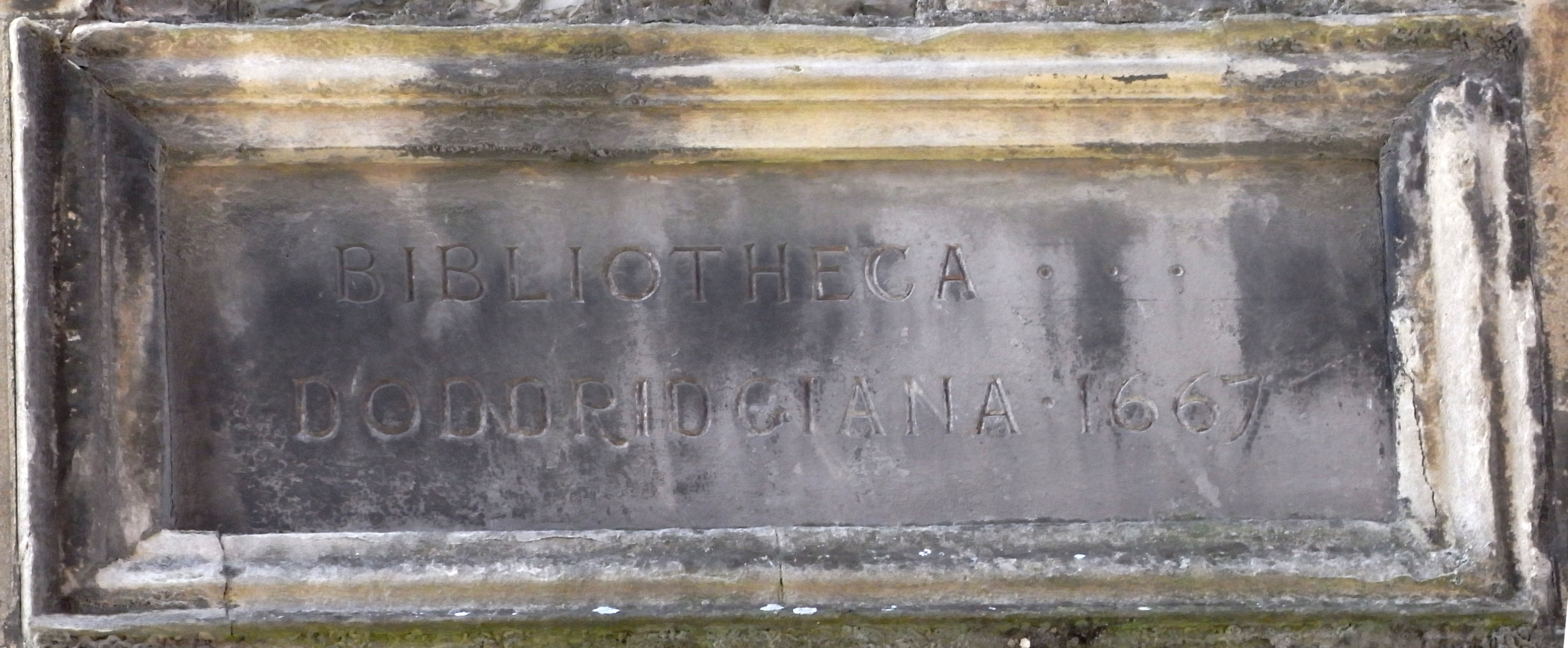
Stone tablet set into external wall of The Dodderidgian Library, Barnstaple, inscribed: Bibliotheca Doddridgiana 1667

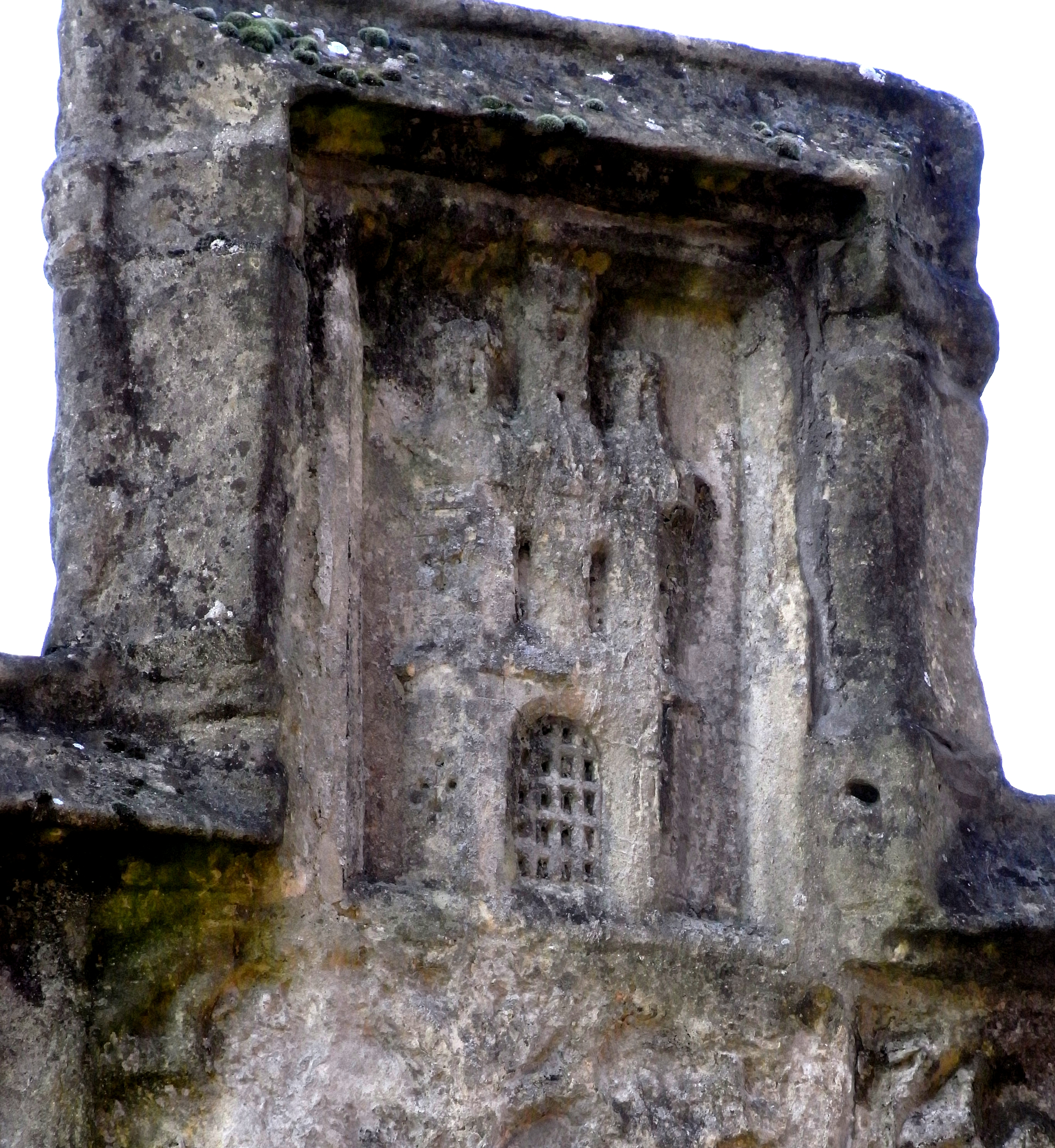
Crenellation on The Dodderidgian Library, showing the armorials of the Corporation of Barnstaple: Gules, a castle of three towers conjoined argent the centre tower larger than the others

The Dodderidgian Library (Latin: Bibliotheca Doddridgiana) was founded in 1667 in Barnstaple, North Devon, England, by Judith Dodderidge, third wife and widow of John Dodderidge (1610–1659) of Barnstaple and Bremridge, South Molton, MP. It represents one of the earliest town libraries in England which continues in existence since its foundation.

== History ==
Dodderidge bequeathed his library to his third wife Judith in the following last line of his will dated 20 January 1658:

"Alsoe I leave the disposing of my library of bookes (unto) my said deare wife whome I make and ordaine sole executrix of this my last will and testament not doubting of her care in the due executing thereof...".

In 1664 she gave or bequeathed the library to the Corporation of Barnstaple. The bequest was of 112 volumes, many of which were originally from the library of her husband's wealthy and prominent uncle Sir John Doddridge (1555–1628), of Barnstaple and Bremridge, MP and a Justice of the King's Bench, as evidenced by his signature in several of them. The collection became known as the Bibliotheca Doddridgiana ("Dodderidgian Library"). A special building was erected to house the books at the north-east corner of the external walls of the chancel of St Peter's Church, Barnstaple.

== Contents ==
The books were chiefly in Latin on the subject of theology, and include most notably a 1610 edition of John Foxe's Book of Martyrs, containing a very well preserved illustration of scenes of Protestant martyrdom. The collection was later expanded.

== Building ==
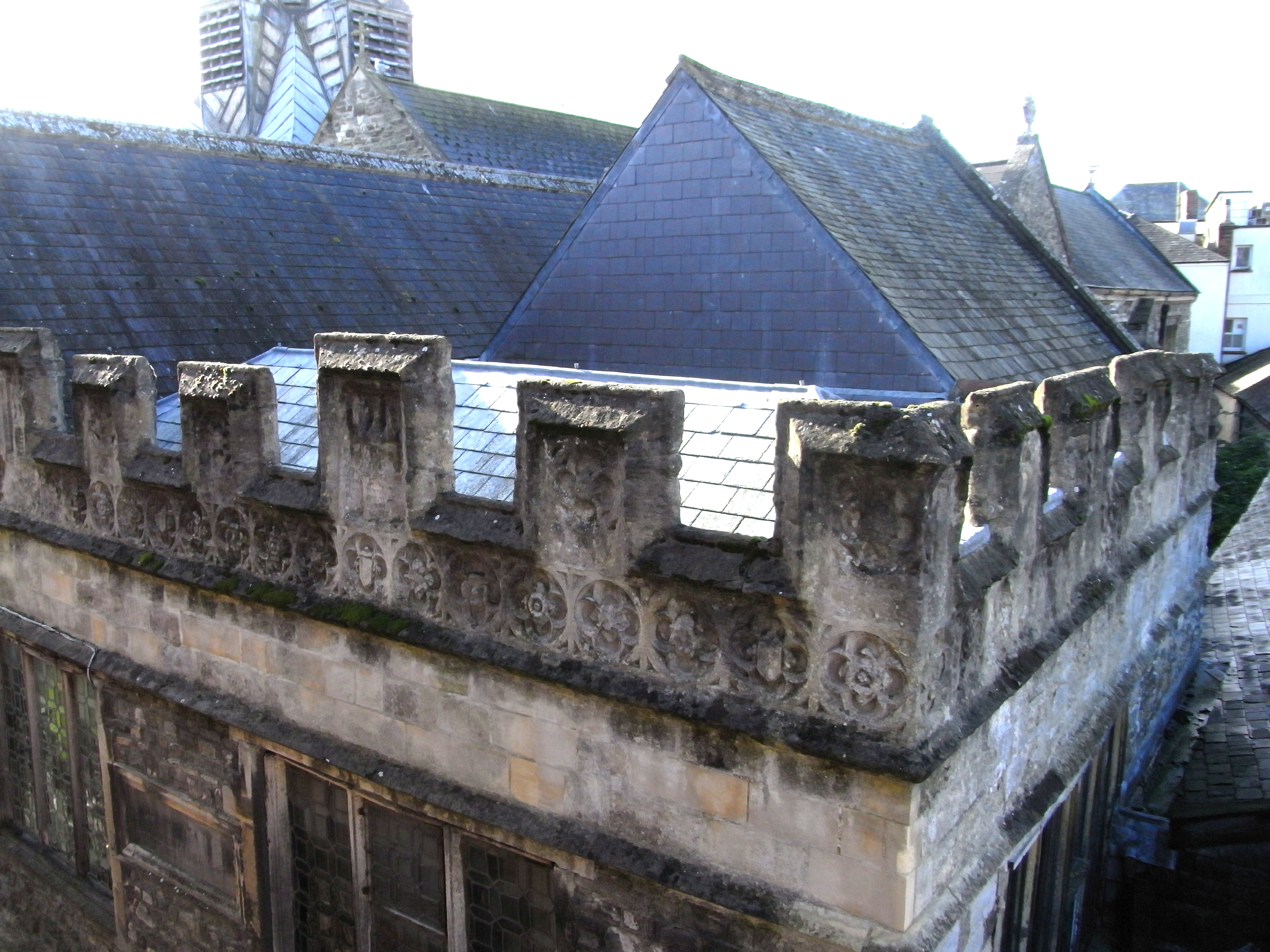
The Dodderidgian Library, Barnstaple. View above roof level looking towards the south-west. The building abuts onto the north-east corner of St Peter's Church, the lead-encased steeple of which is partly visible

The original home of the library was in a small purpose-built two storey crenellated building formed by adding two walls to a concave corner on the north-east end of St Peter's Church, Barnstaple, to form a rectangular building. A stone tablet is set high into the wall inscribed: Bibliotheca Doddridgiana 1667. Its entrance is from the narrow lane known as "Church Walk" which leads southward from "Butchers' Row" past the east end of the parish church and continues as "Church Lane" past the "Church Lane Almshouses". It is a grade II* listed building.

The Barnstaple Millenary Brochure "The Borough of a Thousand Years", mentions that the Dodderidge library was erected in 1665 and that there was a stone in the Parapet which bears the inscription:

J.S.M. - John Seldon, Mayor

M.B.V. - Martin Blake, Vicar

J.O.B. - James Oliver, Builder.

== Removals ==
The Dodderidge collection was removed in 1888 to the North Devon Atheneum (now home to the Museum of Barnstaple and North Devon) and from there in 1957 on permanent loan to Exeter University Library.
