= Richard Beaple =

English politician

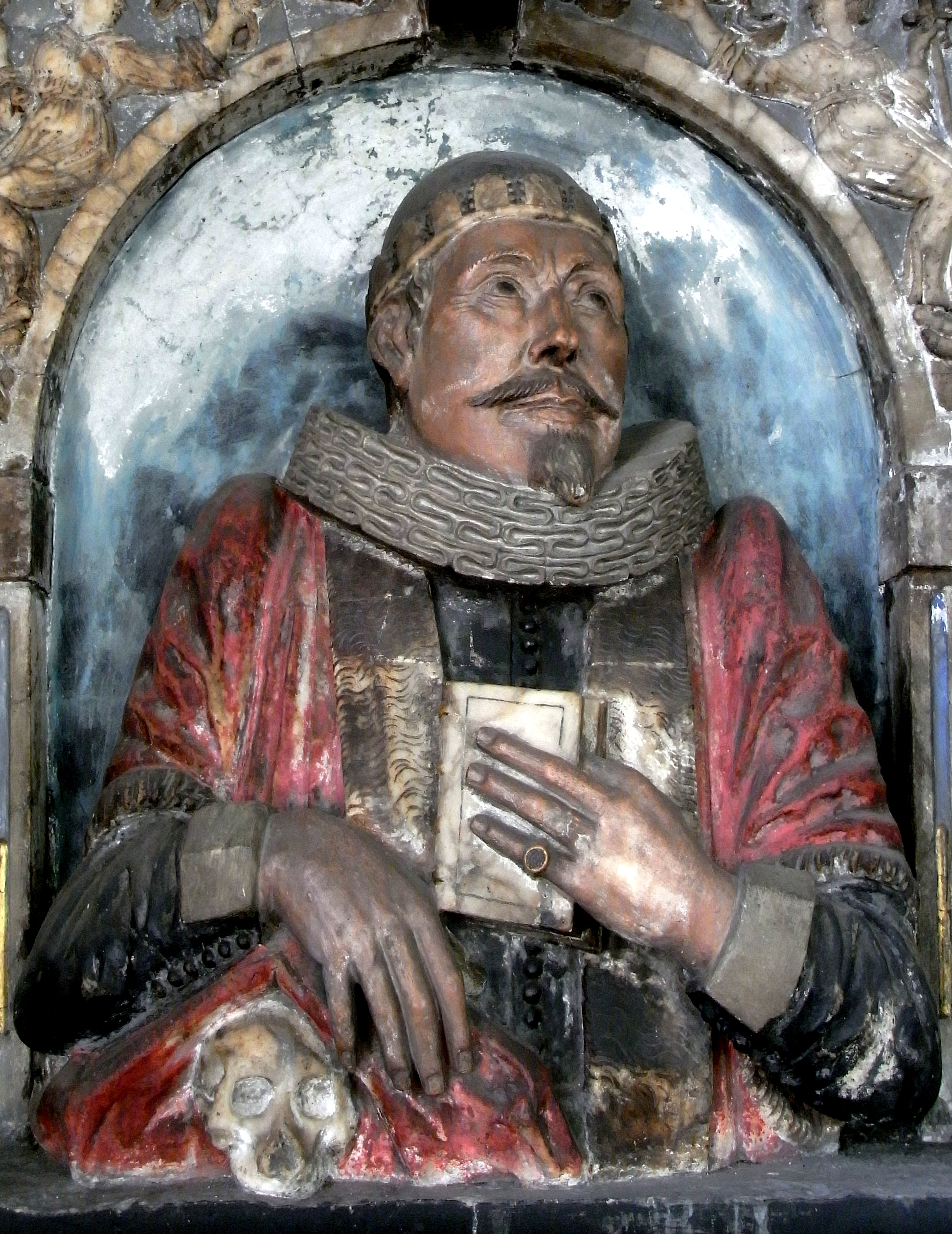
Richard Beaple. Detail from his mural monument in St Peter's Church, Barnstaple

Richard Beaple (1564– 30 December 1643) of Barnstaple, Devon, was a wealthy merchant, ship owner and member of the Spanish Company, and was three times Mayor of Barnstaple in 1607, 1621 and 1635. His elaborate mural monument survives in St Peter's Church, Barnstaple.

== Origins ==
He was one of the four sons of James Beaple (died 1616) of Barnstaple (son of Walter Beaple of Barnstaple), Mayor of Barnstaple in 1593 and 1604, by his first wife Elizabeth Goldsmith. His uncle was Roger Beaple (1540–1604), a tanner who was twice Mayor of Barnstaple, in 1590 and 1599. His two sisters Anne and Joane married into the prominent Barnstaple mercantile families of Delbridge and Horwood respectively. The first recorded member of the Beaple family to have occupied the position of mayor was John Beaple, Mayor in 1559.

== Career ==
In August 1598 Beaple was elected a Common Councilman in place of Roger Cade, who was "put out for that he dwell'd out of this Towne above one year", and was subsequently Mayor of Barnstaple three times, in 1607, 1621 and 1635.

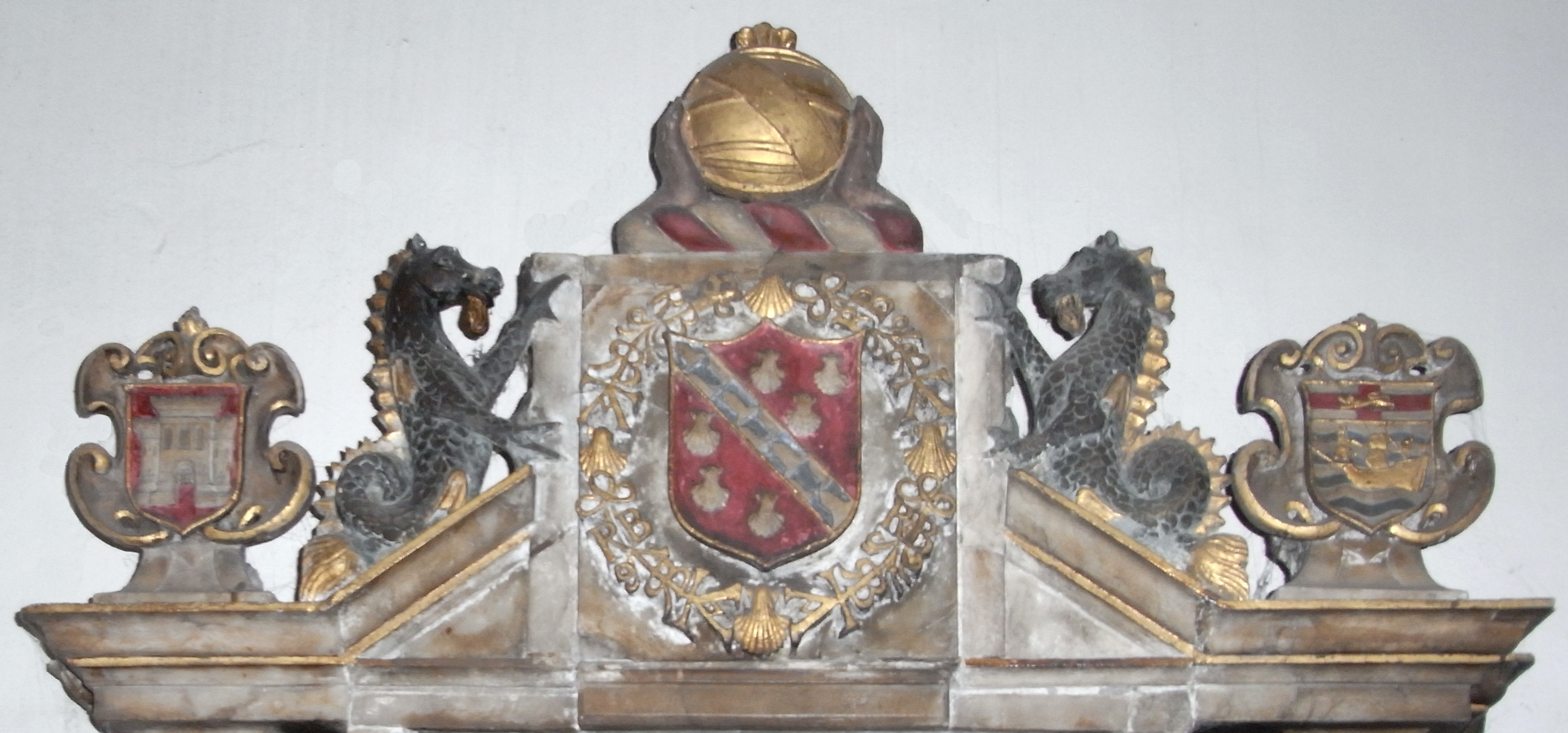
Pediment of Beaple's monument

Beaple was a member of the Spanish Company, the members of which had been granted by royal charter in 1605 exclusive rights to trade with Spain. The pediment of Beaple's monument bears centre, the arms of Beaple with crest and supporters of the Spanish Company. At the left are the arms of the Borough of Barnstaple and at right the arms of the Spanish Company.

Barnstaple was one of the "privileged ports" of the Spanish Company, The royal charter of 1605 which re-established the Spanish Company names several hundred founding members from named English ports, the twelve Barnstaple members being: William Gay, John Salisbury, John Darracott, John Mewles, George Gay, Richard Dodderidge, James Beaple, Nicholas Downe, James Downe, Robert Dodderidge, Richard Beaple and Pentecost Dodderidge, "merchants of Barnstaple". Richard Dodderidge and James Beaple were named as amongst the "first and present assistants and chief councillors of the fellowship".

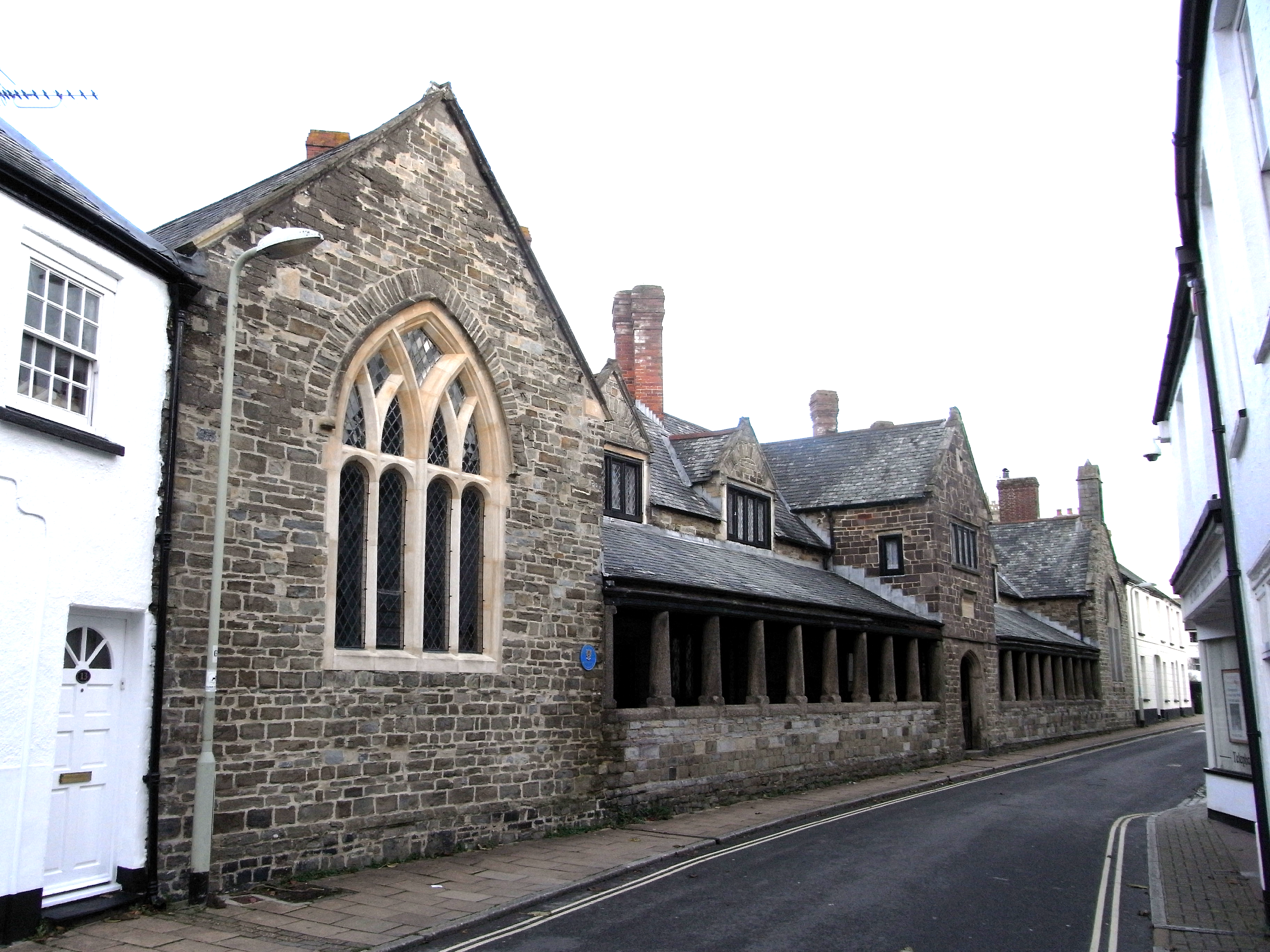
Penrose's Almshouses, Litchdon Street, Barnstaple

Between 1624 and 1627 he and his four co-executors of the will of his son-in-law John Penrose (died 1624), Mayor of Barnstaple in 1620, built the large structure in Litchdon Street, Barnstaple, known today as Penrose's Almshouses.

In 1636 Beaple was appointed one of the executors of the will of Katherine Westlake, with instructions to put into effect her charitable bequest.

== Marriages and children ==
Richard Beaple married three times:

- Firstly to Mary Peard, daughter and heiress of Richard Peard of Barnstaple, a member of a prominent Barnstaple mercantile family, of which several men had been Mayor of Barnstaple. By Mary Peard he had two daughters:
  - Elizabeth Beaple, who in 1609 married Anthony Gay of Goldsworthy in the parish of Parkham, North Devon. Their eldest son John Gay (1613–1678) of Frithelstock, North Devon, was the grandfather of the Barnstaple-schooled poet and dramatist John Gay (1685-1732).
  - Anne Beaple. His other daughter was the wife of John Penrose (died 1624) who left the money to build Penrose's Almshouses.

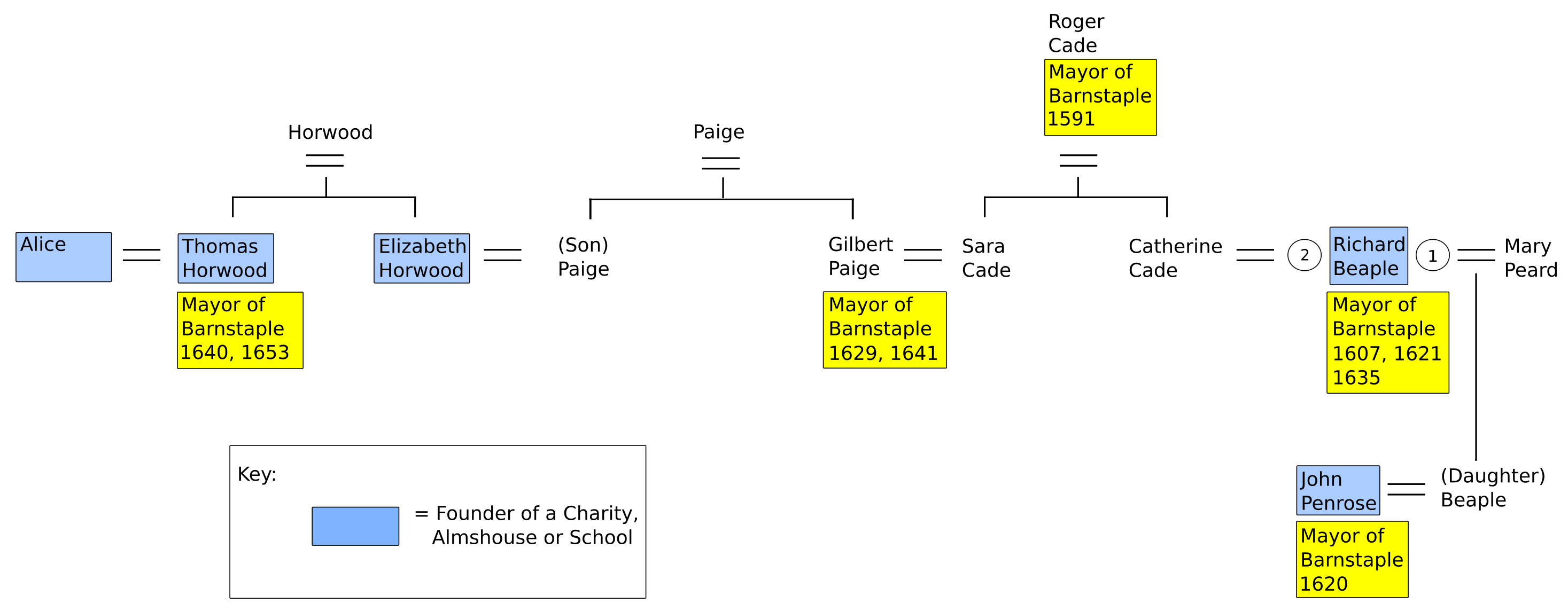
Diagram showing familial connections between the founders of the principal charities, almshouses and schools at Barnstaple in the 17th century

- Secondly he married Catherine Cade (born 1577), daughter of Roger Cade (died 1618) of Barnstaple, Mayor of Barnstaple in 1591, a member of a prominent Barnstaple mercantile family, seated in the nearby parish of Fremington. They had no children. Her sister Sara Cade was the wife of Gilbert Paige (died 1647) of Barnstaple, a merchant who was Mayor of Barnstaple in 1629 and 1641.
- Thirdly he married Grace Gay (died 1651). She was the widow of a certain Mr Estmond and mother of Edward Estmond. Again, there were no children. In Grace's widowhood, during the Civil War, in June 1645, as one of the leading citizens of Barnstaple she was selected as the hostess of the 15-year-old Prince Charles (the future King Charles II), and his large entourage. The visit lasted from about 15 June to 8 July 1645. The Prince's stay in her house was very costly for Grace. These expenses were not easily recovered from the crown, and it was not until after her death that her executor Elizabeth Estmond received the sum of £200 from the royal funds of King Charles II "in discharge of money lent and services rendered to the King when at Barnstaple".

== Legacy ==
Beaple died on 30 December 1643, aged 79. In his will he left £420 to benefit four poor people resident in Penrose's Almshouses. On one side of his monument in St Peter's Church is a small depiction of these almshouses with a group of four poor inmates. It matches one on the other side depicting a merchant pointing to a treasure chest with three sailing ships on the sea behind.

== Sources ==
- Gribble, Joseph Besly. Memorials of Barnstaple: Being an Attempt to Supply the Want of A History of that Ancient Borough, Barnstaple, 1830
- Lamplugh, Lois. Barnstaple: Town on the Taw, South Molton, 2002
- Vivian, Lt.Col. J.L., (Ed.) The Visitations of the County of Devon: Comprising the Heralds' Visitations of 1531, 1564 & 1620, Exeter, 1895
