= George Amyand =

British Whig politician, physician and merchant (1720–1766)

Arms of Amyand: Vert, a chevron between three garbs or

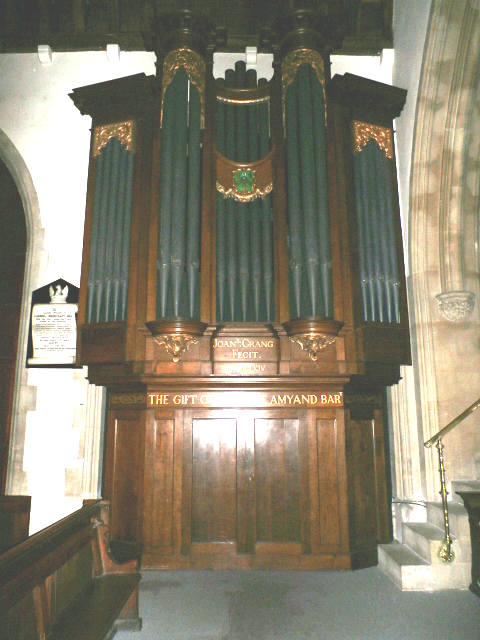
Organ donated by Sir George Amyand, 1st Baronet, St Peter's Church, Barnstaple

Sir George Amyand, 1st Baronet (26 September 1720 – 16 August 1766) was a British Whig politician, physician and merchant.

== Origins ==
He was the second son of Claudius Amyand, Surgeon-in-Ordinary to King George II, by his wife Mary Rabache, and was baptised at the fashionable St James's Church, Piccadilly. Claudius's father was a Huguenot who had quitted France following the Revocation of the Edict of Nantes in 1685.

== Career ==
Amyand was an assistant to the Russia Company in March 1756, an army contractor during the Seven Years' War, who collaborated with Nicholas Magens and Henry Fox, 1st Baron Holland. He was a director of the East India Company in 1760 and 1763. In that year, he bought the manor of Frilsham, Berkshire from Willoughby Bertie, 4th Earl of Abingdon.

Between 1754 and 1766, Amyand sat as Member of Parliament (MP) for Barnstaple, in North Devon. He lived nearby at Great George Street. On 9 August 1764, he was created a baronet, of Moccas Court, in the County of Hereford.

== Marriage and issue ==
In 1748 he married Anna Maria Korten (d. 1767), daughter and heiress of John Abraham Korten (1690-1742) a German merchant from Elberfeld who in 1718 had become a naturalised English subject, having become established at premises in Mincing Lance in the City of London, where he was engaged in exporting textiles and linen from Russia and Europe to the Caribbean, and importing from there Sugar, also importing tobacco and fur from North America. By his wife he had two sons and four daughters:

- Sir George Cornewall, 2nd Baronet (1748–1819), eldest son and heir, who changed his surname and arms to Cornewall following his marriage to the heiress of that family.
- John Amyand (1751–1780 ), MP for Camelford.
- Anna-Maria Amyand (1752–1829), married Gilbert Elliot, 1st Earl of Minto (after whom the Lady Elliot was probably named).
- Anne and Caroline Amyand, twin daughters, bapt. 6 Jun 1754 & died 1754
- Harriet Maria Amyand (1761–1830), married James Harris, 1st Earl of Malmesbury

== Death and burial ==
Amyand died on 16 August 1766, aged 45, from unknown causes, and was buried at Carshalton a week later.

== Monument ==
In the outer south aisle of All Saints Church, Carshalton is a white marble urn, with an inscription in his memory.

== Barnstaple organ donation ==
He donated the present organ in St Peter's Church, Barnstaple, one of the largest in Devon, made by John Crang in 1764. It is decorated with his armorials: Vert, a chevron between three garbs or with an inescutcheon of pretence Or, on a chief azure a crescent argent (Korten?).

Parliament of Great Britain
Preceded by Thomas Benson; Sir Bourchier Wrey	Member of Parliament for Barnstaple; 1754–1766; With: John Harris 1754–1761; Denys Rolle 1761–1766	Succeeded by Denys Rolle; John Clevland
Baronetage of Great Britain
New creation	Baronet (of Moccas Court); 1764–1766	Succeeded by George Cornewall
