= John Crang =

English musical instrument maker (1710–1774)

John Crang (1710-1774) was a maker of keyboard instruments and pipe organs in London in the mid eighteenth century.

== Personal life ==
John Crang was baptised on 4 July 1710 at All Saints, North Molton, Devon, son of John Crang and Grace Pulsford.

== Career ==
Although there was a long history of organ makers who originated from this area of Devon, such as John Chappington and John Loosemore, John Crang does not appear to be directly connected with either of them. He is thought to have been the apprentice of Christopher Shrider, who in turn had been the foreman of the well-known London organ maker, Bernard Smith.

John Crang's earliest known instrument still in existence is a claviorgan (a harpsichord and an organ combined) made in 1745. It was originally located at Nettlefold Castle until 1953 and is now in a collection of musical instruments held by the University of Edinburgh. John Crang repaired organs including in St Paul's Cathedral, London. He also built the organ at St Peter's Church, Barnstaple, one of the largest in Devon, in 1764, which was donated by Sir George Amyand, 1st Baronet (1720-1766), MP for Barnstaple (1754-1766).

He traded on his own account until 1770 from premises in Wych Street, London. In around 1770, two of his nephews, John Crang Hancock and James Hancock, joined him in business, trading as Crang & Hancock. Together they repaired and made a range of keyboard instruments including harpsichords, spinets, pianos and organs.

== Death ==
John Crang died in 1774 and his last will and testament was proved at the Prerogative Court of Canterbury on 19 June 1775

== See also ==
A research paper published in 2023 titled 'A Genealogically Led History of Crang & Hancock, Keyboard Instrument Makers' (2023) by John Binnie-Dawson provides a detailed history of John Crang and his nephews, John Crang Hancock and James Hancock.
