= St Peter's Church, Barnstaple =

Church in Barnstaple, Devon, England

Coordinates: 51°04′49″N 4°03′34″W

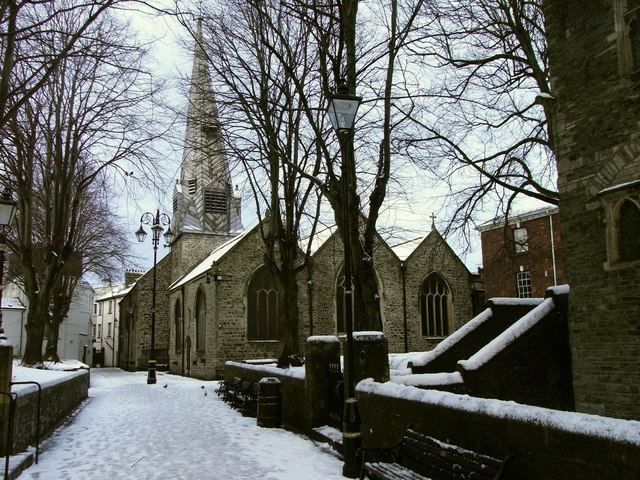
St Peter's Church, Barnstaple, east end

St Peter's Church is the parish church of the town of Barnstaple in North Devon, England. Parts of the church date to the 13th-century with much restoration during the Victorian era by George Gilbert Scott and later by his son John Oldrid Scott which changed the atmosphere of the building, although many fine wall monuments and tablets remain. The church comes under the Diocese of Exeter.

== History ==
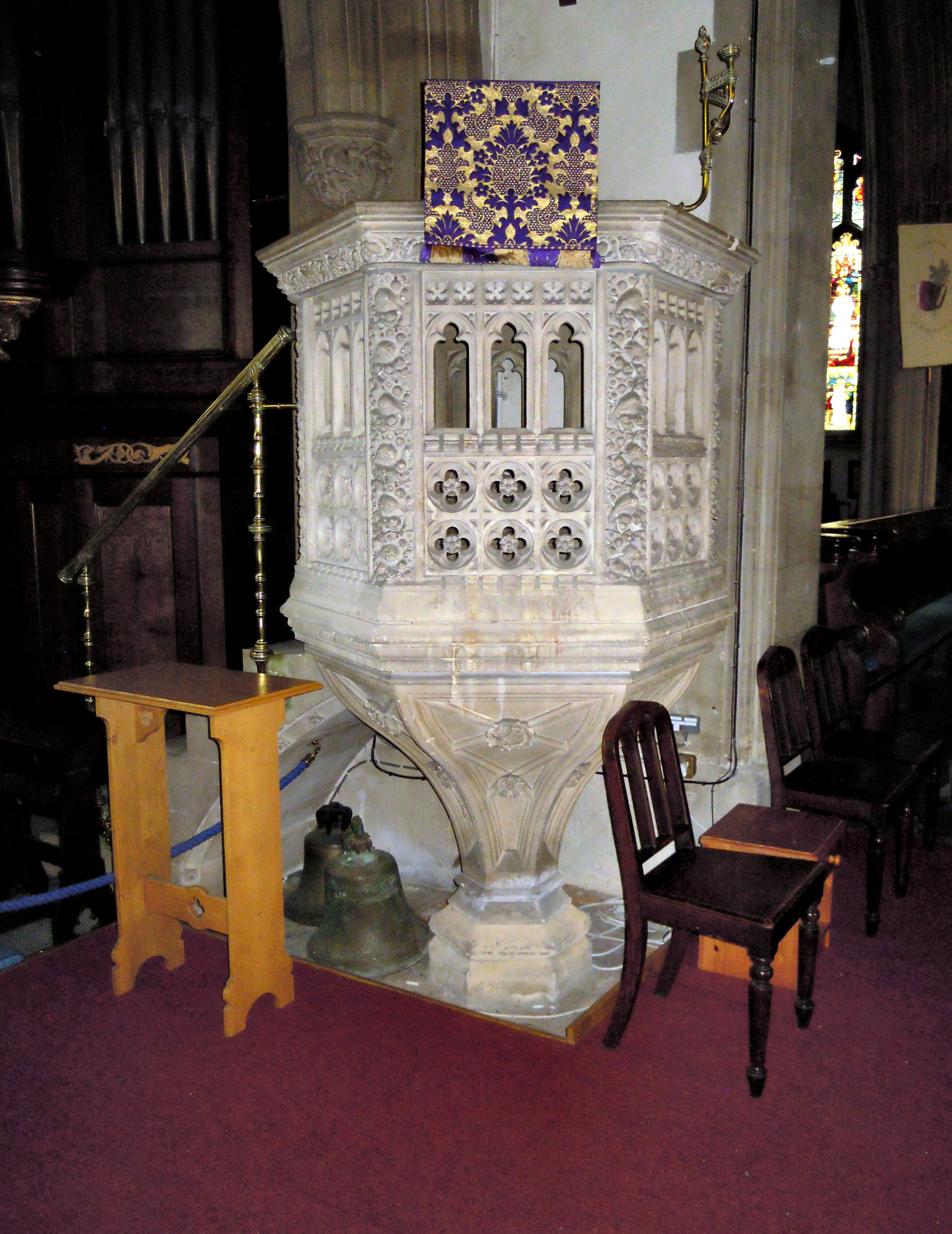
The pulpit

Æthelstan is said to have granted Barnstaple its first Charter in 930 AD and it is believed a church may have existed here then. The town received subsequent Charters in 1154, 1189, 1201 and 1273. The first recorded Rector was Walter Treasurer of Exeter (1257) and the first stone church probably dates from this time. Fragments of the tower are late 13th-century, as are parts of the chancel, although the latter was raised and widened when the north and south aisles were added (or rather were formed out of three then existing chantry chapels) after the Dissolution of the Monasteries in the Perpendicular style to transform a cruciform church into one of rectangular shape. These aisles were rebuilt in about 1670, but retain mural monuments of earlier date. The building was enlarged, probably in 1318 when three altars were dedicated by Walter de Stapledon, Bishop of Exeter. There is a record of a steeple being erected in 1388 but the present lead-covered broach spire dates to the late 17th-century and is said by Hoskins to be the best of its kind in England.

== Advowson ==
The advowson and rectory were long the property of Barnstaple Priory (Priory of St Mary Magdalene), of the Cluniac order. Ancient charters were quoted from by Dugdale (d.1686) in his Monasticon Anglicanum (1718 edition in English) thus:

"The charter of King William the Conqueror grants to St Peter of Clugni under the obedience of St Martin des Champs, or in-the-Fields, at Paris, for the souls of himself and his ancestors and of Jubellus, the donor of this alms, the Church of Barnstaple with all its appurtenances and several other donations of the same founder. William Bishop of Exeter by two several charters confirms to the monks of St Mary Magdalene at Barnstaple the Church of St Peter there and all other grants made to them".

== Features ==
=== Dodderidgian Library ===
The two-storied Dodderidgian Library (Latin: Bibliotheca Doddridgiana) with wooden mullioned windows was built in 1667 in the north-east corner of the chancel. The Dodderidge Library was founded in 1664 by the widow of John Dodderidge (1610-1659), of Barnstaple and of Bremridge in the parish of South Molton, MP for Barnstaple in 1646 and 1654, who donated or bequeathed her husband's library to the Corporation of Barnstaple. He was the son and heir of Pentecost Dodderidge (d.1650), thrice MP for Barnstaple, the younger brother and heir of Sir John Dodderidge (1555–1628), Justice of the King's Bench and Member of Parliament for Barnstaple in 1589. The books were removed to the North Devon Athenaeum in 1888 and from there in 1957 on permanent loan to Exeter University Library.

=== Mayor's Pew ===
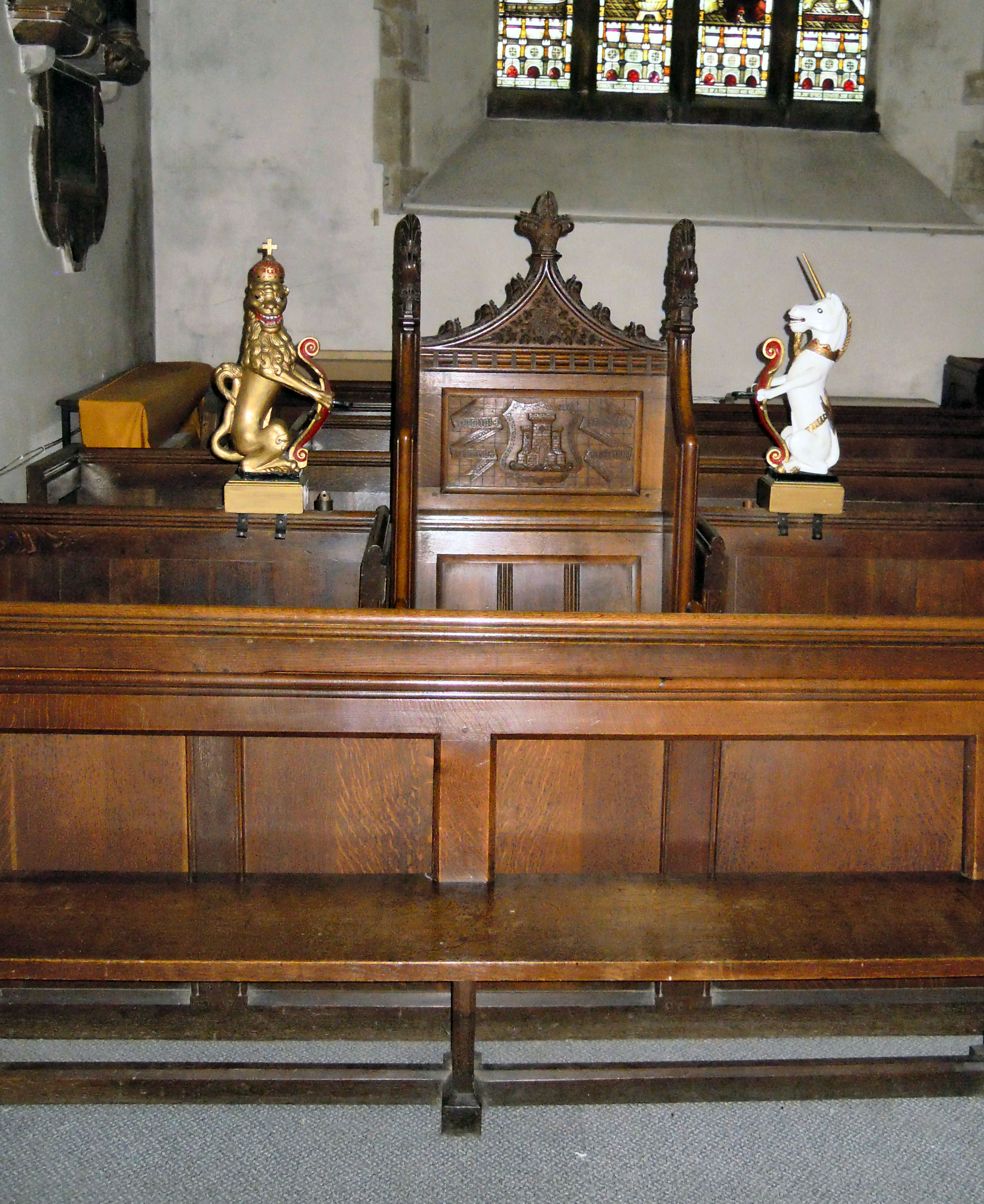
The Mayor's Pew with its heraldic beasts

In the north transept is the ceremonial pew of the Mayor of Barnstaple, in the form of a large wooden armchair with heraldic beasts to each side.

=== Organ ===
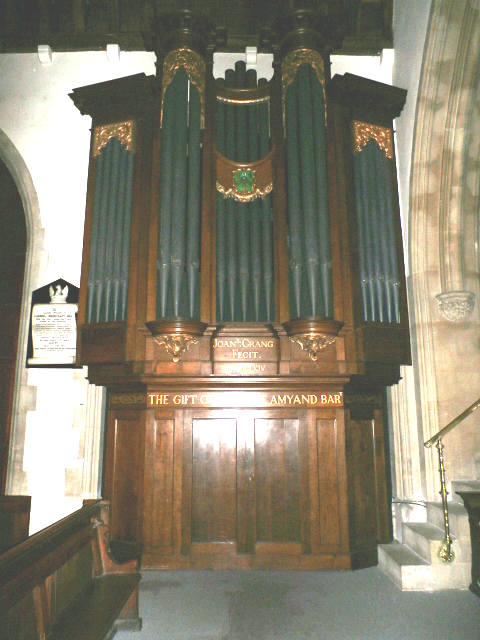
Organ donated by Sir George Amyand, 1st Baronet (1720–1766). Side view, seen from west

The organ, one of the largest in Devon, was made by John Crang in 1764 and was donated by Sir George Amyand, 1st Baronet (1720–1766), MP for Barnstaple 1754–1766. It is decorated with his armorials: Vert, a chevron between three garbs or with an inescutcheon of unidentified arms, overall the Red Hand of Ulster.

=== Monuments ===
Inside the church are many mural monuments to 17th-century merchants, several of whom served as Mayor of Barnstaple. These reflect the prosperity of the town and its port at that time. Monuments include those to:

- Elizabeth Delbridge (d.1628), wife of the merchant John Delbridge (1564–1639) six times MP for Barnstaple and thrice Mayor of Barnstaple.
- 1634 monument to the nine-year-old son and other children of Rev Martin Blake (d.1673), Vicar of Barnstaple, who notably suffered much for his adherence to the Royalist cause as related in John Walker's Sufferings of the Clergy (1714). He rebuilt "at his own great charge" the Vicarage House at Barnstaple, which largely survives today, at the entrance of Barnstaple Priory, originally erected on that site in 1311 by the Prior and Convent. The monument is "as much in allusion to his own position and sufferings", and was described by Chanter (1882) as "perhaps the most noteworthy and interesting monument in the church", "not only a work of art, but of allegorical literature and imagination, telling its tale as fully in its medallions, cartouches and sculptured mottoes as if written - an actual instance of 'sermons in stone'".
- Raleigh Clapham (died 1636),
- Richard Beaple (1564-1643), Mayor in 1607, 1621, 1635. His monument has a roundel depicting Penrose's Almshouses, built 1624–1627 in memory of his son-in-law
- George Peard (died 1644)
- Richard Ferris (d.1649), Mayor 1632, 1646
- Walter Tucker (d.1653), Mayor in 1639
- Thomas Horwood (1600-1658), Mayor in 1640 and 1653.
- Gilbert II Paige (d.1669), son in law of Walter Tucker and son of Gilbert I Paige (d.1647), of Crock Street, twice Mayor, in 1629 and 1641. Paige's Lane in Barnstaple is named after his family.
- Richard Harris (d.1688)

== Victorian restoration ==
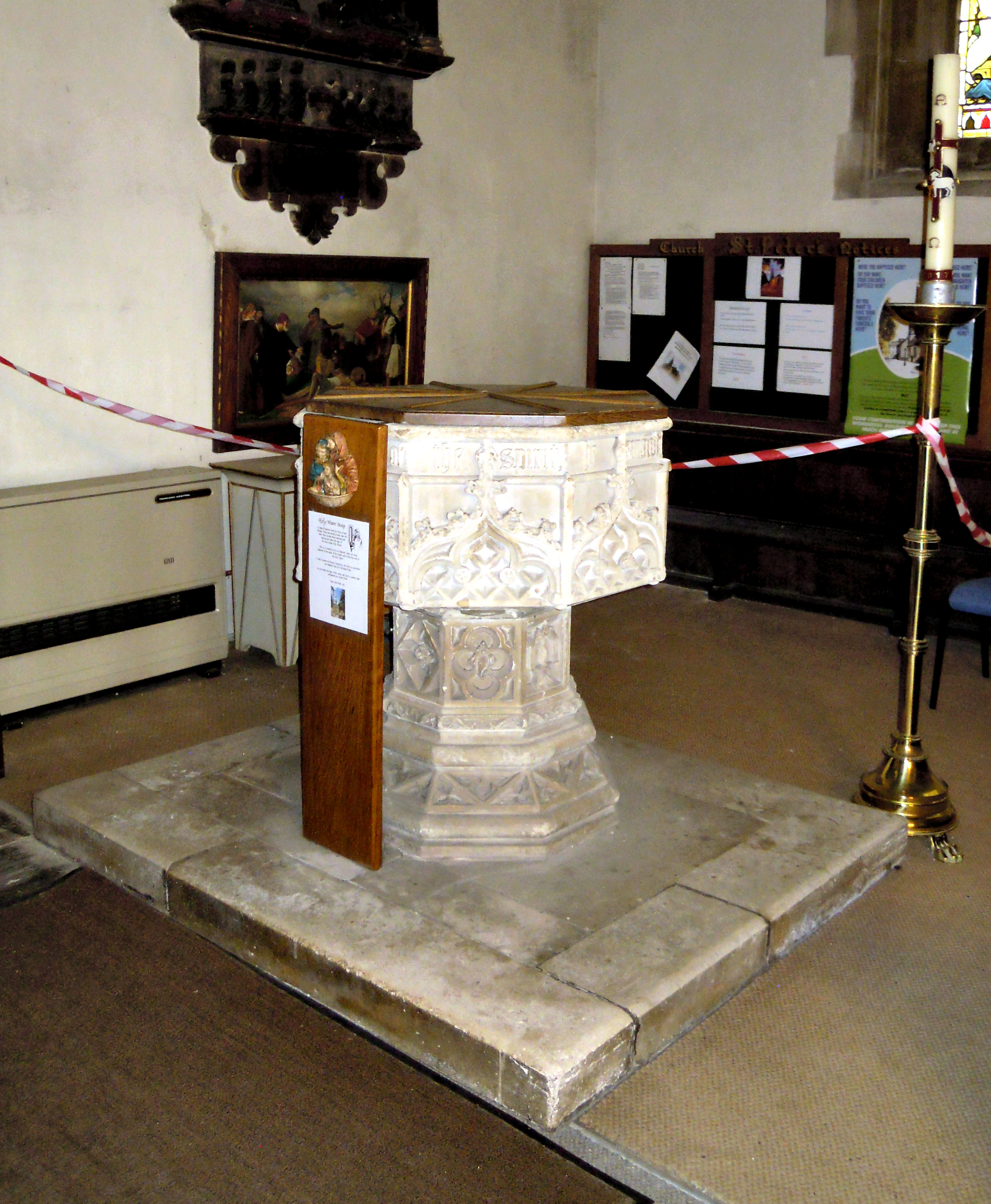
The baptismal font

In 1811 and 1825 galleries were added resulting in the loss of many wall memorials and tablets. The interior received a heavy Victorian restoration by George Gilbert Scott from 1866, and then by his son John Oldrid Scott into the 1880s, during which the unsightly galleries were taken down but which left the church "dark and dull", according to Hoskins. However, Scott refused to demolish the tower, as had been proposed by his patrons, and retained the 17th century large straight-headed and transomed windows of the north aisle. During the restoration many memorials were salvaged and put into the Lady Chapel on the south aisle. The Lady Chapel itself was restored in 1911.
