= Gilbert Paige =

English merchant and mayor

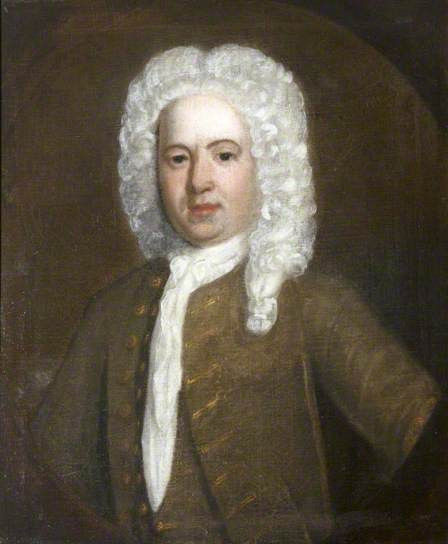
Gilbert Paige, portrait c. 1650 by unknown artist

Gilbert Paige (c. 1580 – 1647) of Crock Street, Barnstaple, and Rookabeare House in the adjoining parish of Fremington, Devon, was a merchant who was twice Mayor of Barnstaple in 1629 and 1641.

== Landholdings ==
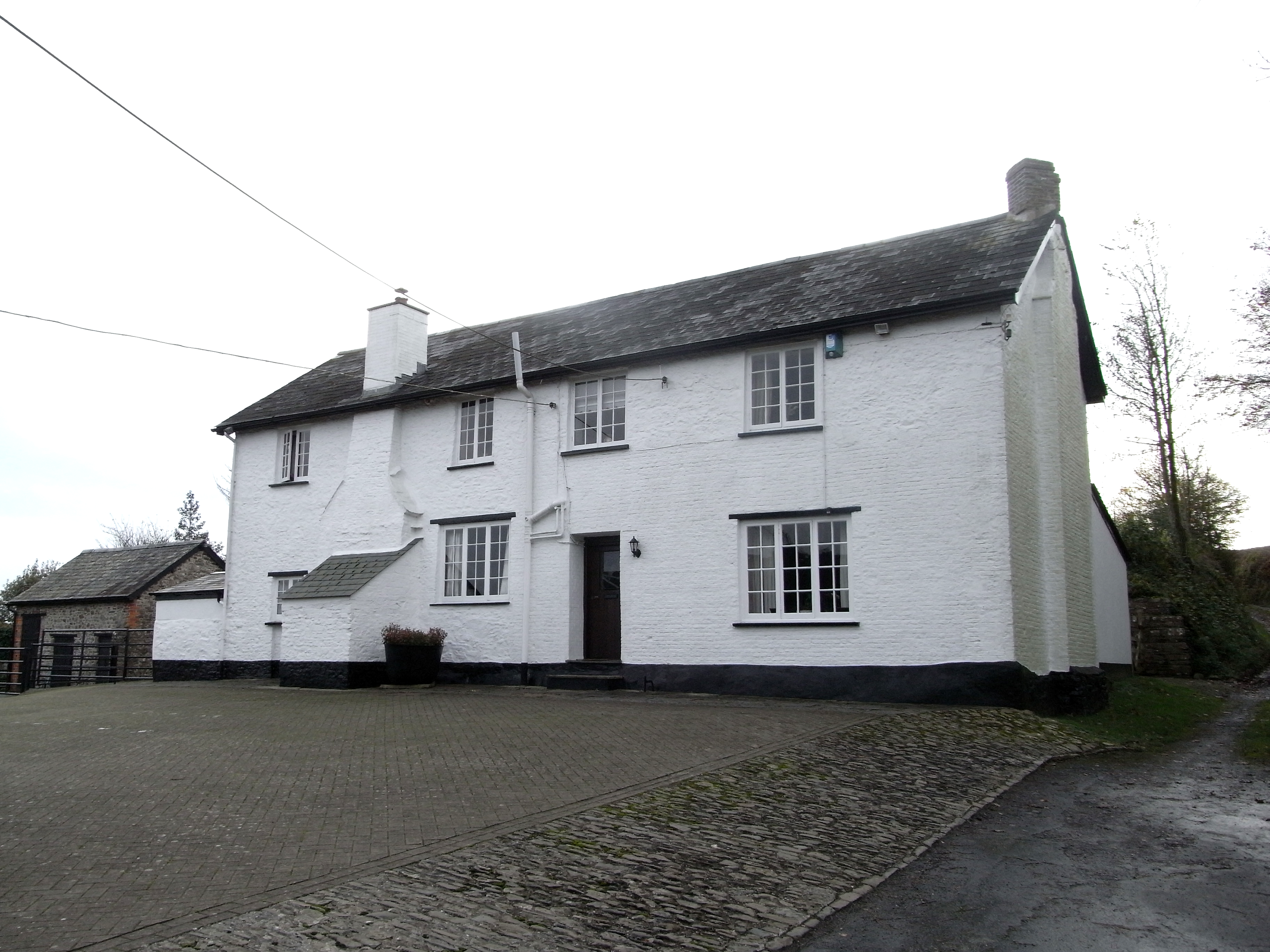
Rookabeare House in the parish of Fremington, in 2015

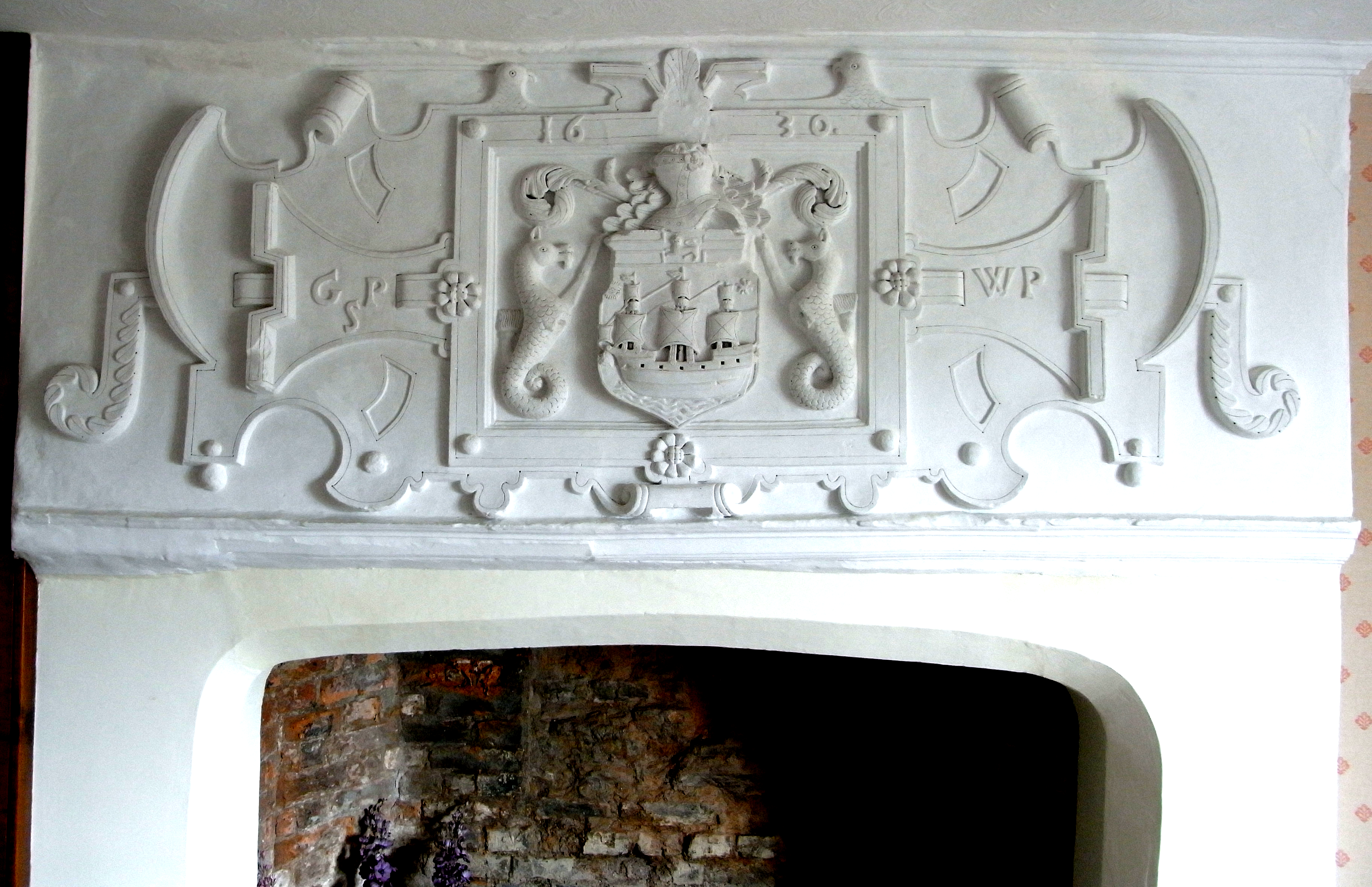
Overmantel in Rookabeare House

As revealed by his will he owned or leased the following properties:

- A house in Crock Street (now Cross Street), Barnstaple, his residence, much favoured by the wealthy merchants of the town, and forming the route from the port and quay to the old guildhall and high cross, both situated on the high street. He bequeathed it to his wife for the term of 50 years.
- A house at the high cross, Barnstaple, in the high street at the top of Crock Street, leased to Robert Leyman
- A "Tenement at Rookebeare in the parish of Ffremington", which as stated in his will he had bought from his brother. This is the farmhouse now known as "Higher Rookabeare", where there is a strapwork overmantel that bears the initials "GSP" and "WP" and the date 1630.
- Garden in Green Lane
- Garden and tenement in Bel Meadow

== Marriage and children ==
Paige married Sara Cade (born 1583), a daughter of Roger Cade (died 1618) of Barnstaple, Mayor of Barnstaple in 1591. Her brother was Samuel Cade (1578–1649) of Fremington, near Barnstaple, and her sister was Catherine Cade (born 1577), the wife of Richard Beaple.

His children by Sara Cade included Gilbert Paige (died 28 March 1669), who married Mary Tucker (died 1674), daughter of Walter Tucker (died 1653), Mayor of Barnstaple in 1639. There is a monument to him in St Peter's Church, Barnstaple. Other children were Roger, John, and a daughter Agnes.

== Death and charitable legacies ==
A copy of his will dated 2 January 1642 and proved 20 May 1647, is preserved in the National Archives. He made the following charitable bequests:

- £5 "to be distributed amongst the poore people of the buroughe and parish of Barnestaple at the time of my ffunerall or shortlie after at the discretion of mine executrix and overseers".
- 40 shillings "to be distributed amongst the poor people of the parish of Ffremington in the said countie of Devon shortlie after my ffunerall by the discretion of my executrix and overseers".
- £5 "to the poore people of Master John Penrose's Almshouses (ffive poundes) to be imployed towardes the buyeing of sea coales for the poore of that howse for ever".
