= Mayor of Barnstaple =

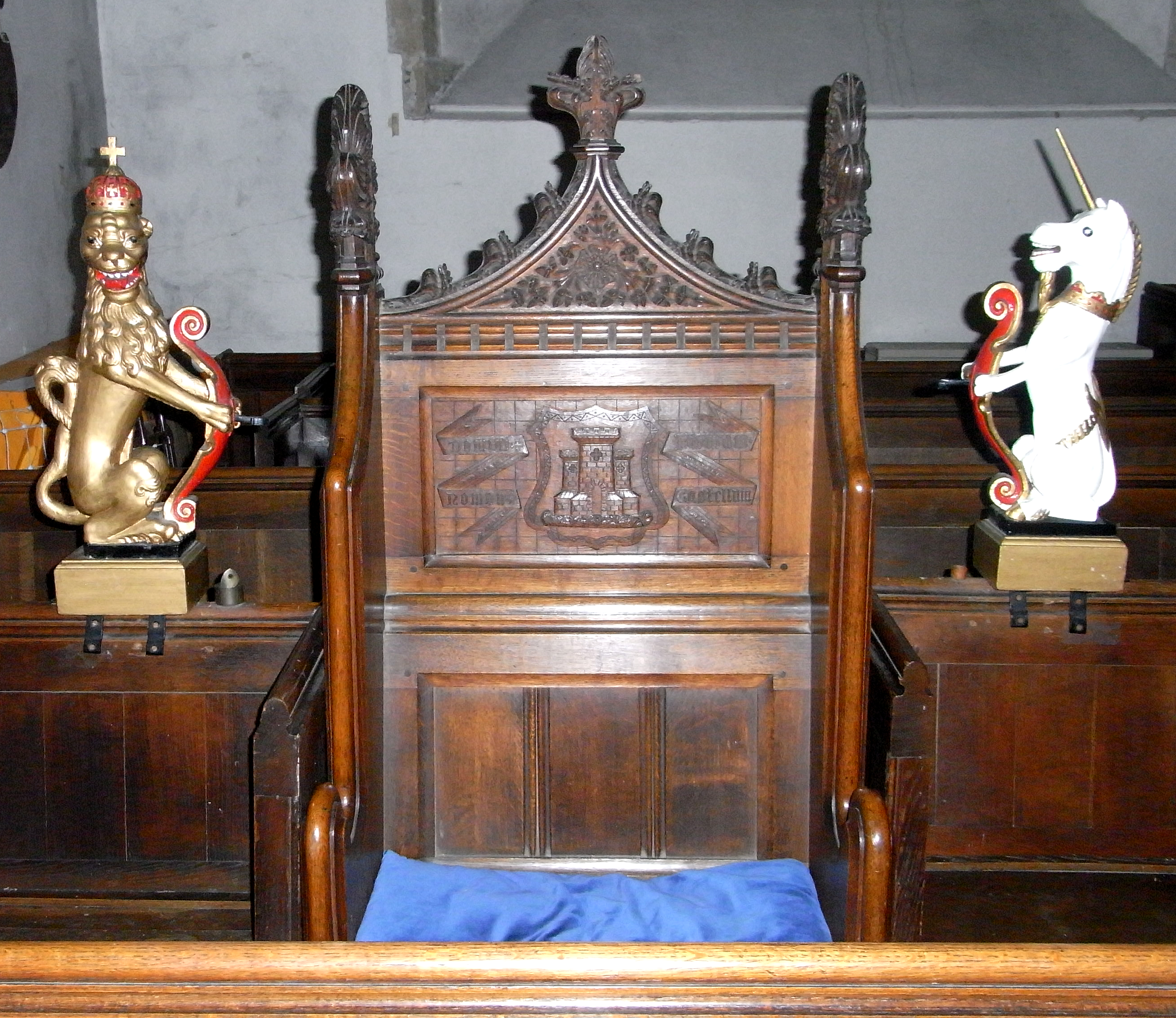
The Mayor's Pew, St Peter's Church, Barnstaple. On the chair back are shown the arms of Barnstaple: Gules a castle of three towers conjoined argent the centre tower larger than the others, between two scrolls inscribed in Latin: Domini Nomen and Firmum Castellum ("The Name of God (is) a Strong Castle")

The Mayor of Barnstaple together with the Corporation long governed the historic Borough of Barnstaple, in North Devon, England. The seat of government was the Barnstaple Guildhall. The mayor served a term of one year. He was elected annually on the Feast of the Assumption of the Virgin (15 August) by a jury of twelve.

Barnstaple was a mesne borough and was held by the Mayor and Corporation in chief not from the king but from the feudal baron of Barnstaple, later known as the lord of the "Castle Manor" or "Castle Court". The Corporation tried on several occasions to claim the status of a "free borough" which answered directly to the monarch and to divest itself of this overlordship, but without success. The mayor was not recognised as such by the monarch, but merely as the bailiff of the feudal baron. The powers of the borough were highly restricted, as was determined by an inquisition ad quod damnum during the reign of King Edward III (1327–1377), which from an inspection of evidence found that members of the corporation elected their mayor only by permission of the lord, legal pleas were held in a court at which the lord's steward, not the mayor, presided, that the borough was taxed by the county assessors, and that the lord held the various assizes which the burgesses claimed. Indeed, the purported ancient royal charter supposedly granted by the Anglo-Saxon King Æthelstan (d.939) (King of the Anglo-Saxons from 924 to 927 and King of the English from 927 to 939) and held by the corporation, from which it claimed its borough status, was suspected to be a forgery.

Since 1974 Barnstaple has been a civil parish governed by a town council.

== List of mayors ==
An incomplete list of the mayors of Barnstaple between 1303 and 1793, was compiled by Benjamin Incledon (1730–1796) of Pilton House, Pilton, near Barnstaple in North Devon, an antiquarian and genealogist, and was published in 1830 within Joseph Besly Gribble's work "Memorials of Barnstaple". A list of mayors from 1301 to 2002 was more recently published in Lois Lamplugh's 2002 work Barnstaple: Town on the Taw, which is based on the complete list which hangs in the Mayor's Parlour of Barnstaple's Guildhall.

The following were mayors of Barnstaple, Devon, England, ordered by monarch:

Edward II
Start of term	End of term	Name	Notes
1301	1303	Simon de la Barre	First recorded Mayor of Barnstaple, although we know that many came before.
1303	1310	Ralph Wynemore	
1310	1314	Simon de la Barre	
1314	1316	John Pollard	
1316	1318	John Collacott M.P.	
1318	1322	John Pollard	
1322	1323	Thomas de la Barre M.P.	
1323	1324	John Collacott	
1324	1326	Bernard de la Bow M.P.	
1326	1327	John Collacott M.P.	

Edward III
Start of term	End of term	Name	Notes
1327	1330	Geoffrey Dyer	
1330	1331	John Collacott	
1331	1332	Gemian Dirna	
1332	1333	Thomas de la Barre M.P.	In 1332, a writ was issued by Edward III to inquire into an alleged indictment for burglary at the Priory in which the Mayor and twenty six burgesses were involved.
1333	1334	John Pollard	
1334	1335	Galfridus de Fremington	
1335	1336	Thomas de la Barre	
1336	1339	Ralph Smallcombe	
1339	1347	Roger Molland M.P.	Molland holds the record for longest consecutive terms served as Barnstaple's Mayor (8 years). Thomas Holman (Mayor for various terms between 1400 and 1415) also served 8 years in total. Only one Mayor has served for longer (Charles F. Dart, 1932-1935, then 1938-1945).
1347	1348	Arnulf Stone	
1348	1349	John Collin	
1349	1350	Bernard Molland	
1350	1351	Robert Dirna	
1351	1352	Thomas Widger	
1352	1353	John Boughdon	
1353	1354	John Squire	
1354	1355	Adam Polman	
1355	1356	John Pugsley	
1356	1357	John Widger	
1357	1358	Simon de la Barre	
1358	1359	Walter Ford	
1359	1360	Simon de la Barre	
1360	1361	Simon Bade M.P.	
1361	1362	Adam Polman	
1362	1363	John Webber	
1363	1364	Walter Yeo	
1364	1365	Richard Dulverton	
1365	1369	William Gibbs	
1369	1370	Simon Bade M.P.	
1370	1372	Richard Dulverton	
1372	1373	William Webber	
1373	1374	William Gibbs	
1374	1375	Richard Dulverton	
1375	1376	Simon Base M.P.	
1376	1378	John Neele	

Richard II
Start of term	End of term	Name	Notes
1378	1379	Simon Bade	
1379	1380	Thomas Lely	
1380	1381	Joyce Anthony	
1381	1382	Thomas Lely	
1382	1384	John Bidwell M.P.	
1384	1385	Thomas Lely	
1385	1387	Joyce Antony	By Antony's second term (1386) he was listed as an M.P. for the borough.
1387	1388	Simon Bade	
1388	1390	John Pitman	
1390	1393	Thomas Hurscott	
1393	1395	Walter Spencer	By Spencer's second term, he was now listed as an M.P. for the borough.
1395	1397	John Bidwell M.P.	
1397	1398	Thomas Hooper M.P.	
1398	1399	William Fulke	
1399	1400	John Bidwell	
1400	1403	Thomas Holman M.P.	

Henry IV
Start of term	End of term	Name
1403	1404	Thomas Hurtescott
1404	1405	John Pitman
1405	1407	Thomas Holman
1407	1411	Thomas Hooper
1411	1413	Thomas Holman
1413	1414	Thomas Walsh

Henry V
Start of term	End of term	Name	Notes
1414	1415	Thomas Holman	At the end of Holman's last term, he had served eight years (not consecutively) as Mayor of Barnstaple, which makes him joint second for longest time in office.
1415	1416	William Hertescott	
1416	1417	Thomas Hooper	
1417	1418	Thomas Walsh	
1418	1419	Henry Redwin M.P.	
1419	1423	Thomas Hooper	

Henry VI
Start of term	End of term	Name	Notes
1423	1424	William Hertescott	
1424	1425	Thomas Hooper	
1425	1426	John Cokeworth and John More	Could be John Cokeworthy I, a local politician. Presumably John Cokeworth died while in office, but this is not known for certain.
1426	1427	John Goldsmith	
1427	1428	Thomas Hooper	Served seven years total as Mayor, making him the fourth longest serving Mayor of Barnstaple.
1428	1432	John Goldsmith	
1432	1433	William Hertescott	
1433	1434	William Bedwin	
1434	1435	Richard Bowden	
1435	1437	William Hertescott	
1437	1438	William Bowden	
1438	1439	William Rowe	
1439	1441	Richard Bowden	
1441	1442	John Mules	
1442	1443	Richard Norris	
1443	1444	William Bedwin	
1444	1445	John Mules	
1445	1446	Walter Hay	
1446	1447	Richard Rowe	
1447	1448	Walter Hayman	
1448	1449	William Hertescott	
1449	1451	Richard Newcombe	
1451	1452	Nichola Bovey	
1452	1453	William Upcott	
1453	1454	Richard Pickard	
1454	1455	John Widger	
1455	1456	Walter Gaynock	
1456	1457	William Charnier	
1457	1358	Walter Gaynock	
1458	1459	Richard Newcombe	
1459	1460	John Widger	The start of an 18 year stint of only Mayors named John.
1460	1461	John Bowden	
1461	1462	John Smith	

Edward IV
Start of term	End of term	Name	Notes
1462	1463	John Collins	
1463	1464	John Widger	
1464	1465	John Collins	
1465	1466	John Widger	
1466	1467	John Bowden	
1467	1468	John Widger	
1468	1469	John Pugsley	
1469	1470	John Bowden	
1470	1471	John Widger	
1471	1472	John Squire	
1472	1473	John Widger	
1473	1474	John Bowden	
1474	1475	John Pugsley	
1475	1476	John Collins	
1476	1477	John Hart	
1477	1478	Philip Stigan	And with the swearing in of Philip Stigan comes the end of the 18-year stint of Johns.
1478	1479	John Branton	
1479	1480	John Bowden	
1480	1481	Thomas White	
1481	1482	John Bowden	
1482	1483	Richard Crews	
1483	1484	Robert Symons	

Richard II
Start of term	End of term	Name
1484	1485	John Smith
1485	1486	Walter Nicholls

Henry VII
Start of term	End of term	Name
1486	1487	William Dallington
1487	1488	William Hart
1488	1489	Philip Warington
1489	1490	Robert Symons
1490	1491	John Salisbury
1491	1492	William Dallington
1492	1493	Roger Colmer
1493	1494	Richard Parminter
1494	1495	Robert Symons
1495	1496	Arthur Merryfield
1496	1497	John Salisbury
1497	1498	Roger Colmer
1498	1499	Richard Parminter
1499	1500	William Cosby
1500	1501	John Salisbury
1501	1502	Richard Dobyn
1502	1503	Richard Symons
1503	1504	Philip Warington
1504	1505	Arthur Merryfield
1505	1506	John Upcott
1506	1507	John Smith
1507	1508	William Dolyn
1508	1509	Thomas Story
1509	1510	Robert Colmer

Henry VIII
Start of term	End of term	Name	Notes
1510	1511	John Godsland	
1511	1512	Thomas Story	
1512	1513	William Dobney	
1513	1514	John Godsland	
1514	1515	Thomas Beck	
1515	1516	Thomas Ferrye	Probably a misspelling of the later Mayor Thomas Ferry (1519-1520).
1516	1517	Thomas Alec	
1517	1518	Robert Colmer	
1518	1519	Thomas Alec	
1519	1520	Thomas Ferry	
1520	1521	Robert Cockram	
1521	1522	Paul Smith	
1522	1523	John Upcott	
1523	1524	John Merryfield	
1524	1525	Arthur Merryfield	
1525	1526	John Godsland	
1526	1527	Philip Colman	
1527	1529	Richard Haydon	
1529	1530	Thomas Beck	
1530	1531	Walter Salisbury	
1531	1532	Paul Smith	
1532	1533	John Manyng	
1533	1534	Richard Gay	Belongs to a family that is represented on the Mayors Chain of 1911.
1534	1535	David Philips	
1535	1536	John Manyng	
1536	1537	Philip Colmer	
1537	1538	Baldwin Peard	Belongs to a family that is represented on the Mayors Chain of 1911.
1538	1539	Richard Skinner	
1539	1540	Walter Salisbury	
1540	1541	Henry Drewe	
1541	1542	John Manyng	
1542	1543	Richard Gay	
1543	1544	Thomas Jeffries	
1544	1545	John Godsland	
1545	1546	John Holland	
1546	1547	William Canford	
1547	1548	Thomas Davy	

Edward VI
Start of term	End of term	Name
1548	1549	Henry Cade
1549	1550	Roger Worth
1550	1551	James Godsland
1551	1552	Richard Skinner
1552	1553	Thomas Davy
1553	1554	John Smith

Mary
Start of term	End of Term	Name	Notes
1554	1555	Robert Apley	
1555	1556	Robert Cade	
1556	1557	George Stapleton	Stapleton was the first officially chartered Mayor of the Borough.
1557	1558	John Dart	
1558	1559	William Salusbury	Misspelled as 'Salisbury' on Barnstaple's official List of Mayors. Salusbury was also M.P. for Barnstaple between 1554 and 1558.

Elizabeth
Start of term	End of term	Name	Notes
1559	1560	John Beaple	Belongs to a family that is represented on the Mayors Chain of 1911.
1560	1561	Edward Colscott	
1561	1562	John Daymond	
1562	1563	Nicholas Whichalse	
1563	1564	William Dawkins	
1564	1565	Hugh Brazier	
1565	1566	Oliver Peard	
1566	1567	John Daymond	
1567	1568	John Arscott	
1568	1569	John Dart	
1569	1570	Robert Apley	
1570	1571	Robert Cade	
1571	1572	Thomas Beaple	Belongs to a family that is represented on the Mayors Chain of 1911.
1572	1573	Philip Holland	
1573	1574	Hugh Brazier	
1574	1575	William Dawkins	
1575	1576	John Barrett	
1576	1577	William Collibear	
1577	1578	Paul Worth	
1578	1579	John Harris	
1579	1580	John Dodderidge	Was M.P. for Barnstaple between 1646 and 1654. John Dodderidge was the grandfather of Pentecost Dodderidge, the original owner of the Dodderidge Fireplace which now resides in the Dodderidge room in Barnstaple's Guildhall. Belongs to a family that is represented on the Mayors Chain of 1911.
1580	1581	John Welsh	
1581	1582	John Daymond	
1582	1583	Robert Apley	
1583	1584	Richard Apley	
1584	1585	William Collibear	
1585	1586	William Palmer	
1586	1587	George Pyne	
1587	1587	Richard Peard	Died while in office, was succeeded by John Harris. Belongs to a family that is represented on the Mayors Chain of 1911.
1587	1588	John Harris	
1588	1589	Robert Prowse	
1589	1590	Richard Dodderidge	Belongs to a family that is represented on the Mayors Chain of 1911. Father of Pentecost Dodderidge, original owner of the Dodderidge Fireplace which now resides in the Dodderidge room in Barnstaple's Guildhall.
1590	1591	Roger Beaple	
1591	1592	Roger Cade	
1592	1593	Paul Worth	
1593	1594	James Beaple	Belongs to a family that is represented on the Mayors Chain of 1911.
1594	1595	William Collibear	
1595	1596	George Pyne	
1596	1597	John Harris	
1597	1598	Robert Apley Jr	
1598	1599	Nicholas Down	
1599	1600	Roger Beaple	
1600	1601	John Delbridge	
1601	1602	George Stanbury	
1602	1603	Bartholemew Harris	
1603	1604	Paul Worth	

James I
Start of term	End of term	Name	Notes
1604	1605	James Beaple	Belongs to a family that is represented on the Mayors Chain of 1911.
1605	1606	James Woodroffe	
1606	1607	John Peard	
1607	1608	Richard Beaple	
1608	1609	Richard Harris	
1609	1610	James Downe	
1610	1611	William Shapleigh	
1611	1612	Pentecost Dodderidge	Original owner of the Dodderidge Fireplace which now resides in the Dodderidge room in Barnstaple's Guildhall. Belongs to a family that is represented on the Mayors Chain of 1911.
1612	1613	William Palmer	
1613	1614	Nicholas Downe	
1614	1615	Adam Lugge	
1615	1616	John Delbridge	
1616	1617	George Baker	Belongs to a family that is represented on the Mayors Chain of 1911.
1617	1618	James Balteel	
1618	1619	Thomas Westlake	
1619	1620	Nicholas Deldridge	
1620	1621	John Penrose	Belongs to a family that is represented on the Mayors Chain of 1911. A portrait of John Penrose hangs in the Main Chamber of Barnstaple's Guildhall.
1621	1622	Richard Beaple	
1622	1623	John Pearl	Belongs to a family that is represented on the Mayors Chain of 1911.
1623	1624	Justinian Westcomb	
1624	1625	John Hanmer	
1625	1626	Edward Eastcond	

Charles I
Start of term	End of term	Name	Notes
1626	1627	Richard Harris	
1627	1628	Pentecost Dodderidge	
1628	1629	Nicholas Downe	
1629	1630	Gilbert Paige	Misspelled on the List of Mayors in Barnstaple's Guildhall as 'Gilbert Page'.
1630	1631	Richard Medford	
1631	1632	William Palmer	
1632	1633	Richard Ferris	
1633	1634	John Delbridge	
1634	1635	Alexander Horwood	
1635	1636	Richard Beaple	Belongs to a family that is represented on the Mayors Chain of 1911.
1636	1637	Henry Mason	
1637	1638	Pentecost Dodderidge	
1638	1638	George Ferris	
1638	1639	Anthony Gay	
1639	1640	Walter Tucker	
1640	1641	Thomas Horwood	Misspelled on the List of Mayors in Barnstaple's Guildhall as 'Thomas Hocwood', despite Alexander Horwood's name being spelled correctly six years earlier.
1641	1642	Gilbert Paige	
1642	1643	William Palmer	
1643	1644	Charles Peard	Belongs to a family that is represented on the Mayors Chain of 1911.
1644	1645	Adam Lugge	
1645	1646	John Downe	
1646	1647	Richard Ferris	
1647	1648	William Nottel	
1648	1649	Richard Harris	
1649	1650	Nicholas Cooke	

The Commonwealth
Start of term	End of term	Name
1650	1651	Hugh Horsham
1651	1652	Thomas Dennys
1652	1653	Thomas Matthew
1653	1654	Thomas Horwood
1654	1655	John Horwood
1655	1656	Richard Medford
1656	1657	Roger Jeffrey
1657	1658	Peter Docton
1658	1659	Joseph Delbridge
1659	1660	William Westcomb
1660	1661	Richard Hooper

Charles II
Start of term	End of term	Name	Notes
1661	1662	Adam Lugge	
1662	1663	John Downe	
1663	1664	Arthur Ackland	
1664	1665	John Seldon	
1665	1666	John Palmer	
1666	1667	John Gread	
1667	1668	Thomas Matthew	
1668	1669	Thomas Cox	
1669	1670	Richard Medford	
1670	1671	Roger Jeffrey	
1671	1672	George Roobe	
1672	1673	William Westcomb	
1673	1674	Christopher Hunt	
1674	1675	Richard Hooper	
1675	1676	Thomas Cole	
1676	1677	Thomas Harris	
1677	1678	Richard Salisbury	
1678	1679	John Fairchild	
1679	1680	Henry Drake	Belongs to a family that is represented on the Mayors Chain of 1911.
1680	1681	John Stephens	
1681	1682	Hugh Marshall	Belongs to a family that is represented on the Mayors Chain of 1911.
1682	1683	William Wakeman	
1683	1684	Edward Rice	
1684	1685	George Fairchild	
1685	1686	John Peard	Belongs to a family that is represented on the Mayors Chain of 1911.

James II
Start of term	End of term	Name
1686	1687	John Blake
1687	1688	Henry Ravening
1688	1689	Richard Barnes
1689	1690	Christopher Hunt

William and Mary
Start of term	End of term	Name	Notes
1690	1691	James Kimpland	Belongs to a family that is represented on the Mayors Chain of 1911.
1691	1692	Nicholas Cooke	
1692	1693	Thomas Seldon	
1693	1694	John Hunt	
1694	1695	Nicholas Ginger	
1695	1696	William Greenslade	
1696	1697	Geoffrey Bagilhole	
1697	1698	Charles Standish	
1698	1698	Nathaniel Cox	Died in office, succeeded by Hugh Marshall.
1698	1699	Hugh Marshall	
1699	1700	Richard Cornish	
1700	1701	Thomas Harris	
1701	1702	John Rowley	
1702	1703	John Webber	

Anne
Start of term	End of term	Name	Portrait	Notes
1703	1703	Philip Greenslade		Died in office, succeeded by W. Wakeman.
1703	1704	W. Wakeman		
1704	1705	Richard Cornish		
1705	1706	Benjamin Baller		
1706	1707	William Tailor		
1707	1708	James Slodey		
1708	1709	Richard Methuish		
1709	1710	Robert Gread		
1710	1711	John Phillips		
1711	1712	John Marshall		Belongs to a family that is represented on the Mayors Chain of 1911.
1712	1713	Robert Incledon		Belongs to a family that is represented on the Mayors Chain of 1911.
1713	1714	Giles Randle		Belongs to a family that is represented on the Mayors Chain of 1911.
1714	1715	William Roberts		

George I
Start of term	End of term	Name	Portrait	Notes
1715	1716	John Baker		
1716	1717	Christopher Luntro		
1717	1718	Robert Nicholls		
1718	1719	Edward Fairchild		
1719	1720	John Webber		
1720	1721	John Phillips		
1721	1722	Robert Incledon		Belongs to a family that is represented on the Mayors Chain of 1911. A portrait of Robert Incledon hangs in the Main Chamber of Barnstaple's Guildhall.
1722	1723	Lewis Gregory		
1723	1724	James Kimpland		
1724	1725	Zachary Chappell		
1725	1726	Edward Fairchild		
1726	1727	John Gaydon		A portrait of John Gaydon hangs in the Main Chamber of Barnstaple's Guildhall.
1727	1728	John Marshall		

George II
Start of term	End of term	Name	Notes
1728	1729	Richard Newell	A portrait of Richard Newell hangs in the Main Chamber of Barnstaple's Guildhall.
1729	1730	John Baker	A portrait of John Baker hangs in the Main Chamber of Barnstaple's Guildhall.
1730	1731	George Score	A portrait of George Score hangs in the Main Chamber of Barnstaple's Guildhall.
1731	1732	Samuel Berry	Belongs to a family that is represented on the Mayors Chain of 1911. A portrait of Samuel Berry hangs in the Main Chamber of Barnstaple's Guildhall.
1732	1733	Benjamin Baller	
1733	1734	Thomas Harris	A portrait of Thomas Harris hangs in the Main Chamber of Barnstaple's Guildhall.
1734	1735	Charles Velby	A portrait of Charles Velby hangs in the Main Chamber of Barnstaple's Guildhall, incorrectly listed as 'Charles Velly'.
1735	1736	Richard Knight	A portrait of Richard Knight hangs in the Main Chamber of Barnstaple's Guildhall.
1736	1737	Paul Tucker	A portrait of Paul Tucker hangs in the Main Chamber of Barnstaple's Guildhall.
1737	1738	Alexander Webber	A portrait of Alexander Webber hangs in the Main Chamber of Barnstaple's Guildhall.
1738	1739	Henry Beavis	A portrait of Henry Beavis hangs in the Main Chamber of Barnstaple's Guildhall.
1739	1740	George Wickey	A portrait of George Wickey hangs in the Main Chamber of Barnstaple's Guildhall.
1740	1741	John Fraine	A portrait of John Fraine hangs in the Main Chamber of Barnstaple's Guildhall.
1741	1742	Matthew Roch	Belongs to a family that is represented on the Mayors Chain of 1911.
1742	1743	Roger Chappell	A portrait of Roger Chappell hangs in the Main Chamber of Barnstaple's Guildhall, incorrectly listed as 'Roger Chapple'.
1743	1744	John Baker	A portrait of John Baker hangs in the Main Chamber of Barnstaple's Guildhall.
1744	1745	Charles Wright	A portrait of Charles Wright hangs in the Main Chamber of Barnstaple's Guildhall.
1745	1746	Robert King	A portrait of Robert King hangs in the Main Chamber of Barnstaple's Guildhall.
1746	1747	Marshall Swayne	A portrait of Marshall Swayne hangs in the Main Chamber of Barnstaple's Guildhall.
1747	1748	Mark Slee	A portrait of Mark Slee hangs in the Main Chamber of Barnstaple's Guildhall.
1748	1749	Charles Marshall	Belongs to a family that is represented on the Mayors Chain of 1911. A portrait of Charles Marshall hangs in the Main Chamber of Barnstaple's Guildhall.
1749	1750	Charles Velby	A portrait of Charles Velby hangs in the Main Chamber of Barnstaple's Guildhall, incorrectly listed as 'Charles Velly'.
1750	1751	Richard Knight	A portrait of Richard Knight hangs in the Main Chamber of Barnstaple's Guildhall.
1751	1752	Henry Beavis	A portrait of Henry Beavis hangs in the Main Chamber of Barnstaple's Guildhall.
1752	1753	John Fraine	A portrait of John Fraine hangs in the Main Chamber of Barnstaple's Guildhall.
1753	1754	Matthew Roch	A portrait of Matthew Roch hangs in the Main Chamber of Barnstaple's Guildhall.
1754	1755	Benjamin Grant	Belongs to a family that is represented on the Mayors Chain of 1911.
1755	1756	Richard Thorne	
1756	1757	Daniell Marriott	
1757	1758	Henry Drake	A portrait of Henry Drake hangs in the Main Chamber of Barnstaple's Guildhall.
1758	1759	Paul Tucker	A portrait of Paul Tucker hangs in the Main Chamber of Barnstaple's Guildhall.
1759	1760	Thomas Earl	
1760	1761	Mounier Roch	Son of Matthew Roch, Mayor of 1753.

George III
	Start of term	End of term	Name	Notes
1761	1761	Charles Venn	Died in office, succeeded by Richard Knight.	
1761	1762	Richard Knight	A portrait of Richard Knight hangs in the Main Chamber of Barnstaple's Guildhall.	
1762	1763	Roger Chappell	A portrait of Roger Chappell hangs in the Main Chamber of Barnstaple's Guildhall, incorrectly listed as 'Roger Chapple'.	
1763	1764	Charles Marshall	Belongs to a family that is represented on the Mayors Chain of 1911. A portrait of Charles Marshall hangs in the Main Chamber of Barnstaple's Guildhall.	
1764	1765	John Baker	A portrait of John Baker hangs in the Main Chamber of Barnstaple's Guildhall.	
1765	1766	Edward Houndle		
1766	1767	Nicholas Shepperd	Belongs to a family that is represented on the Mayors Chain of 1911.	
1767	1768	Richard Thorne		
1768	1769	Daniel Mariott		
1769	1769	Richard Honychurch	Richard Honychurch died on the day he was sworn in. Given this day (9 November 1769) is often cited as the day Barnstaple had three Mayors, it can be assumed that S. Moule was sworn in to succeed Honychurch on the same day.	
1769	1770	S Moule		
1770	1771	Samuel Chappell		
1771	1772	John Robins		
1772	1773	Henry Colley		
1773	1774	Nicholas Shepperd Jnr	Belongs to a family that is represented on the Mayors Chain of 1911.	
1774	1775	George Greek		
1775	1776	Francis Tucker		
1776	1777	James Reed		
1777	1778	Charles Marshell		
1778	1779	Mounier Rock		
1779	1780	Stewkley Stephens		
1780	1781	John Moule		
1781	1782	Roger Chappell	A portrait of Roger Chappell hangs in the Main Chamber of Barnstaple's Guildhall, incorrectly listed as 'Roger Chapple'.	
1782	1783	Edward Houndle		
1783	1784	John Law	Belongs to a family that is represented on the Mayors Chain of 1911.	
1784	1785	William Cottle		
1785	1785	Samuel Chappell	Assumed that Samuel Chappell died in office, but not confirmed. M Rock succeeded as Mayor.	
1785	1786	Mournier Rock		
1786	1787	John Tucker		
1787	1788	Nicholas Glass		
1788	1789	John Robert		
1789	1790	John May		
1790	1791	William Dean		
1791	1792	George Greek		
1792	1793	William Law	Belongs to a family that is represented on the Mayors Chain of 1911.	
1793	1793	John Servante	John Servante left the town and was succeeded by George Greet (probably Greek).	
1793	1794	George Greet	Probably George Greek, Mayor in 1791.	
1794	1795	Henry Gardiner Tippetts		
1795	1796	Charles Marshall		
1796	1797	John Moule		
1797	1798	Richard Rowe Metherall		
1798	1799	William Slocombe		
1799	1800	John Gaydon		
1800	1801	Nicholas Sheppard		
1801	1802	Thomas Copner		
1802	1803	William Servante		
1803	1804	John Law		
1804	1805	Nicholas Glass		
1805	1805	Henry Bellow	Died in office, succeeded by John Moule.	
1805	1806	John Moule		
1806	1807	John Pyke	Belongs to a family that is represented on the Mayors Chain of 1911.	
1807	1808	John Roberts		
1808	1809	Philip Bremridge	Belongs to a family that is represented on the Mayors Chain of 1911.	
1809	1810	Samuel Bremridge	Belongs to a family that is represented on the Mayors Chain of 1911.	
1810	1811	John May		
1811	1812	William Law		
1812	1813	Richard Rowe Metherell		
1813	1814	William Slocombe		
1814	1815	William Chapple Pewle		
1815	1816	John May Jnr		
1816	1817	Edward Richard Roberts		
1817	1818	Samuel Bremridge		
1818	1819	William Law Jnr	Belongs to a family that is represented on the Mayors Chain of 1911.	
1819	1820	John Law		
1820	1821	Thomas Copner		

George IV
Start of term	End of term	Name	Notes
1821	1822	T. Pyke	
1822	1823	Charles Roberts	
1823	1824	John Cooke	
1824	1825	John Marshall	Belongs to a family that is represented on the Mayors Chain of 1911.
1825	1826	Samuel Bremridge	
1826	1827	Henry Nicholls, Clerke	
1827	1828	Nicholas Glass	
1828	1829	Robert Budd	
1829	1830	Richard Bremridge	Belongs to a family that is represented on the Mayors Chain of 1911.
1830	1831	Edward Richard Roberts	

William IV
Start of term	End of term	Name	Notes
1831	1832	William Law	
1832	1833	Richard Grace	
1833	1834	John Law	Belongs to a family that is represented on the Mayors Chain of 1911.
1834	1835	John Marshell	
1835	1836	John Law	
1836	1837	Stephen Bencraft	A portrait of Stephen Bencraft is on display in Barnstaple's Guildhall.
1837	1838	James Marsh	Belongs to a family that is represented on the Mayors Chain of 1911.

Victoria
Start of term	End of term	Name	Notes
1838	1839	William Avery	Belongs to a family that is represented on the Mayors Chain of 1911.
1839	1840	John Knill Cotton	Belongs to a family that is represented on the Mayors Chain of 1911.
1840	1841	Samuel Linnington	
1841	1842	Gilbert Knill Cotton	Belongs to a family that is represented on the Mayors Chain of 1911.
1842	1843	John Sherrard Clay	
1843	1844	William Latham	
1844	1845	Robert Budd	Belongs to a family that is represented on the Mayors Chain of 1911.
1845	1847	William Avery	Belongs to a family that is represented on the Mayors Chain of 1911.
1847	1848	Henry Ivie Gribble	
1848	1849	John Sherrard Clay	
1849	1850	John Morris Fisher	
1850	1851	John William Tatham	
1851	1853	William Avery	Belongs to a family that is represented on the Mayors Chain of 1911.
1853	1854	Robert Budd	
1854	1854	William Dyer	"Mr. Dyer died seven weeks after his election - being the only Mayor of Barnstaple since 1785 who has died during his year of office. On the 27th of December, 1854, Mr. John Harris was elected to the Mayoralty."
1854	1855	John Harris	Belongs to a family that is represented on the Mayors Chain of 1911.
1855	1856	Cadwallader Edward Palmer	
1856	1857	Frederick Maunder	
1857	1858	John Bignell	
1858	1859	Richard Bremridge	Belongs to a family that is represented on the Mayors Chain of 1911.
1859	1860	John Roberts Chanter	
1860	1861	Cadwalladar Edward Palmer	
1861	1862	John Norrington	
1862	1863	Michael Cooke	
1863	1864	Thomas William Matthew Wilks Guppy	
1864	1865	Thomas Lambe Willshire	
1865	1866	John May Miller	
1866	1867	Richard Farleigh	
1867	1868	Henry Gribble	
1868	1869	Thomas William Matthew Wilks Guppy	
1869	1871	William Thorne	
1871	1872	Charles Crassweller	
1872	1874	Thomas May	
1874	1875	Joseph Harper	
1875	1876	William Avery	
1876	1878	Charles Sweet Willshire	
1878	1881	William Avery	Belongs to a family that is represented on the Mayors Chain of 1911.
1881	1882	Joseph Harper	Belongs to a family that is represented on the Mayors Chain of 1911.
1882	1883	Richard Ashton	Belongs to a family that is represented on the Mayors Chain of 1911.
1883	1884	Henry T. Besley	Belongs to a family that is represented on the Mayors Chain of 1911.
1884	1885	Lionel T. Bencraft	Belongs to a family that is represented on the Mayors Chain of 1911.
1885	1887	Alexander Lauder	Belongs to a family that is represented on the Mayors Chain of 1911.
1887	1888	Arthur F Seldon	
1888	1889	Richard Ashton	
1889	1891	Richard Lake	Belongs to a family that is represented on the Mayors Chain of 1911.
1891	1892	William Penhale	
1892	1893	James Brady	Belongs to a family that is represented on the Mayors Chain of 1911.
1893	1894	Colonel H Hibbert	Belongs to a family that is represented on the Mayors Chain of 1911.
1894	1895	Samuel Berry	Belongs to a family that is represented on the Mayors Chain of 1911.
1895	1897	William A. Roberts	
1897	1899	Charles E. R. Chanter	
1899	1900	Joseph G. Hamling	
1900	1902	George W. F. Brown	

Edward VII
Start of term	End of term	Name	Notes
1902	1906	Henry Barrett	Belongs to a family that is represented on the Mayors Chain of 1911.
1906	1907	George T. Andrew	Belongs to a family that is represented on the Mayors Chain of 1911.
1907	1908	A. J. Reavell	Belongs to a family that is represented on the Mayors Chain of 1911.
1908	1910	Frederick Hunt	Belongs to a family that is represented on the Mayors Chain of 1911.

George V
Start of term	End of term	Name	Notes
1910	1911	John Thomas White	Belongs to a family that is represented on the Mayors Chain of 1911.
1911	1912	John R. Harper	Belongs to a family that is represented on the Mayors Chain of 1911.
1912	1919	Frank W. Jewell	Belongs to a family that is represented on the Mayors Chain of 1911.
1919	1920	Charles Pearce	
1920	1921	Harry Ashton	
1921	1922	Walter Lewis Croot	
1922	1923	Frank L. Thomas	
1923	1924	Frederick Elliott	
1924	1925	Gerald B. Oerton	
1925	1926	J. C. Dixey	
1926	1927	Frederick Chanter	
1927	1928	John Own Jones	
1928	1929	George F. A. Whitlock	
1929	1931	John T. Dunn	
1931	1932	Bruce W. Oliver	
1932	1935	Charles F. Dart	
1935	1936	Arthur J. Manaton	

Edward VIII
Start of term	End of term	Name
1936	1938	Wilfred Slatter

George VI
Start of term	End of term	Name	Notes
1938	1945	Charles F. Dart	Charles F. Dart holds the record for longest time (cumulatively) served as Mayor of Barnstaple.
1945	1946	Romeo Berry	
1946	1947	Maurice E. P. Killard-Leavey	
1947	1949	William Henry Wilkey	
1949	1952	F. James B. Sanders	

Elizabeth II
Start of term	End of term	Name	Consort	Notes
1952	1953	John Bryon Cruse		
1953	1954	Charles F. Dart		
1954	1956	Albert W. Clarke		
1956	1957	Robert E. King		
1957	1959	Frank H. S. McDavid		
1959	1960	Walter J. Thomas		
1960	1961	R. Michael Huxtable		
1961	1963	Stanley W. Woolaway		
1963	1965	Arthur S. Williams		
1965	1967	William Henry Wilkey		
1967	1968	James H. Rayner		
1968	1970	Reg. G. Chugg		
1970	1972	Guy Casey		
1972	1973	Keith N. Abraham		
1973	1974	Douglas G. Potter		
1974	1976	Charles Dibble	Mrs Dibble	
1976	1977	Elizabeth M. Fern	Mrs D Pengelly	Elizabeth M. Fern was Barnstaple's first female Mayor.
1977	1978	Leonard H. Ellway	Mrs Ellway	
1978	1980	William H. Luxton	Mrs Luxton	
1980	1981	Ian E. A. Scott	Margaret Scott	
1981	1982	Faye V. T. Webber	Mr Webber	
1982	1984	John Bosence	Cllr Mrd Bosence	
1984	1986	Jeffery T. Nott	Mrs Knott	
1986	1987	Alan J. Winton	Mrs Winton	
1987	1989	William Forward	Mrs Forward	
1989	1991	Leonard H. Ellway	Mrs Ellway	
1991	1993	Donald Hurrell	Gail Kemp	
1993	1995	Ian A. E. Scott	Margaret Scott	
1995	1996	Donald Hurrell	Sandra Millist	
1996	1997	Ronald Muir	Ruth Muir	
1997	2000	Bill Forward	Mrs Forward	
2000	2002	John Preston	Janet Preston	
2002	2004	Chris Haywood	Sue Haywood	
2004	2006	Arthur Windsor	Lesley Windsor	
2006	2008	Sue Haywood	Chris Haywood	
2008	2010	Jeremy Philips	Valerie Elkins	
2010	2012	Ian Roome	Linda Lewis	
2012	2014	Lesley Brown		
2014	2016	Valerie Elkins	Roy Elkins	
2016	2018	Julie Hunt	David Hunt	
2018	2019	Ian Roome	Linda Lewis	
2019	2022	Alan Rennles	Sue Rennles	
2022	2024	Louisa York	Keith York	
2024	Present	Janet Coates		
