= Cusop =

Village in Herefordshire, England

Coordinates: 52.067°N 3.110°W

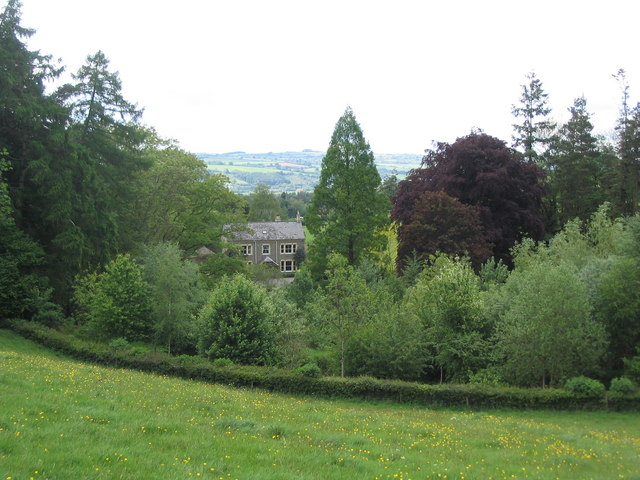
- Cusop Dingle in both Wales and England.

- Location within Herefordshire
- Population: 356 (2011)
- OS grid reference: SO239415
- Unitary authority: Herefordshire
- Ceremonial county: Herefordshire
- Region: West Midlands
- Country: England
- Sovereign state: United Kingdom
- Post town: HEREFORD
- Postcode district: HR3
- Dialling code: 01497
- Police: West Mercia
- Fire: Hereford and Worcester
- Ambulance: West Midlands
- UK Parliament: Hereford and South Herefordshire

Cusop is a village and civil parish in Herefordshire, England that lies at the foot of Cusop Hill next to the town of Hay-on-Wye in Wales. It is a short walk from Hay, the distance between bus stops, and can be reached by walking or driving out of Hay towards Bredwardine, and turning right into Cusop Dingle.

== Etymology and history ==
The village is possibly first recorded in Domesday Book, as "Cheweshope", and certainly attested in the later twelfth century as Kiweshope, in 1292 as Kywishope, and as Kusop and Cusop from 1302. The second element of the name is agreed to originate as the Old English word hōp 'valley'. The origin of the first element, however, is uncertain. One possibility is that the first part of the name was once the name of a stream which ran through the eponymous valley, perhaps one of a number of examples of Brittonic river-names corresponding to the Welsh word cyw 'young of an animal'.

The Manor of Cusop formed part of the Ewyas Lacy Hundred and was once owned by the Clanowe family, Edward III, Henry ap Griffith, Vaughans of Moccas and the Cornewall Family, lastly George Cornewall.

== Notable people ==
The writer L.T.C. Rolt lived here as a boy between 1914 and 1922, in a house then known as "Radnor View", in a development locally called "Thirty Acres". He went on to co-found the Inland Waterways Association and the Talyllyn Railway Preservation Society, and to write many books on transport, engineering biography and industrial archaeology.

Penelope Chetwode, separated wife of Poet Laureate John Betjeman, mother of journalist and writer Candida Lycett Green and author of Two Middle-Aged Ladies in Andalucia, lived at New House, a cottage on Cusop Hill. Penelope attended St. Joseph's RC church in Hay-on-Wye.

== St Mary's Church ==
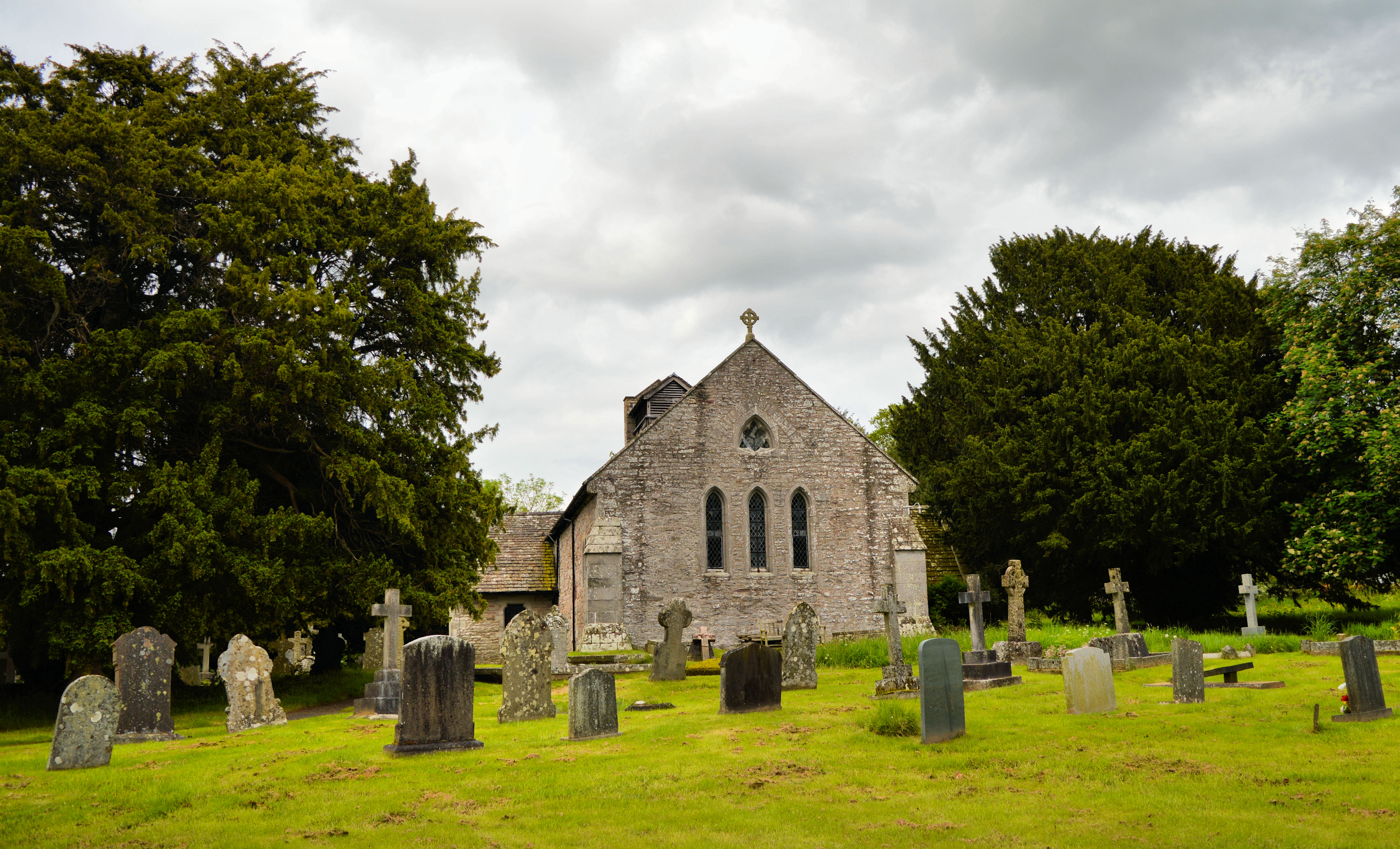
St. Mary's Cusop (and Yew trees)

The church of St Mary, Cusop, although heavily restored over the centuries (and in particular in 1857; the North Vestry, South Porch and the W. wall of the nave are modern) still retains a Norman chancel arch, a Norman window (the west-most in the south wall), and a Norman font. Its scissor beam roof structure dates back to the 14th century.

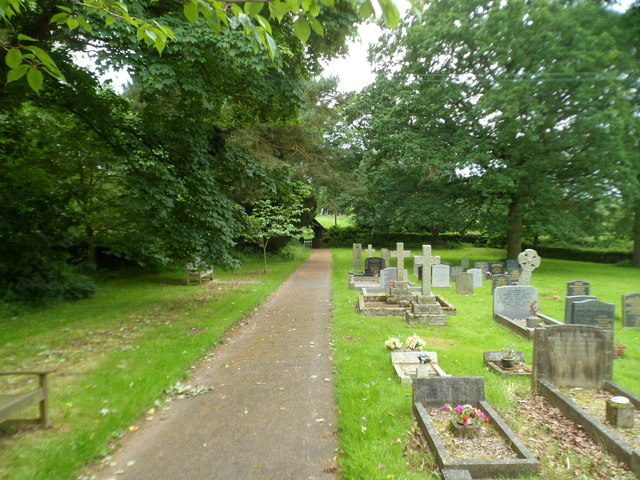
Churchyard path, St. Mary's, Cusop

In the churchyard may be found the graves of the Methodist Martyr William Seward, 'lawyer, author and yachtsman' Martin Beales, and Kitty (Katherine Mary) Armstrong (née Friend), victim of the notorious Hay Poisoner, a Commonwealth war grave of a Herefordshire Regiment soldier of World War I, as well as a ring of ancient yew trees.

== Cusop Dingle ==
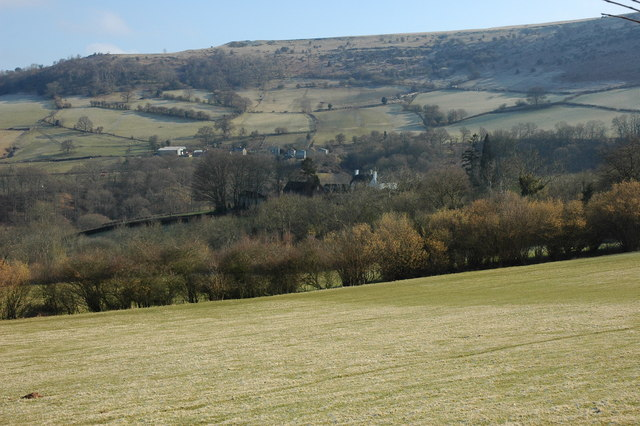
View across Cusop Dingle

Cusop Dingle is a wooded valley near the village. It is notable in entomological history as the place where the fly Platypeza hirticeps was discovered in 1899.

In the Dingle is a single track road, locally known as 'Millionaire's Row', because of the large, Victorian houses which line the route up to Offa's Dyke Path, one of the popular walking tracks in the West of England. It runs alongside the Dulas Brook (forming the border between Wales and England) into the foothills of the Black Mountains. With a multitude of waterfalls, the Dulas Brook is home to trout, otter and kingfishers.

Cusop Dingle was home to the poisoner Herbert Rowse Armstrong, the only English solicitor ever hanged for murder, and the grave of his wife Katharine is in the parish churchyard. His former home, originally Mayfield but now The Mantles, was owned by Martin Beales, a solicitor working in Armstrong's old office in Hay. Beales believed that Armstrong was innocent and published a book arguing his case.

== Castles ==
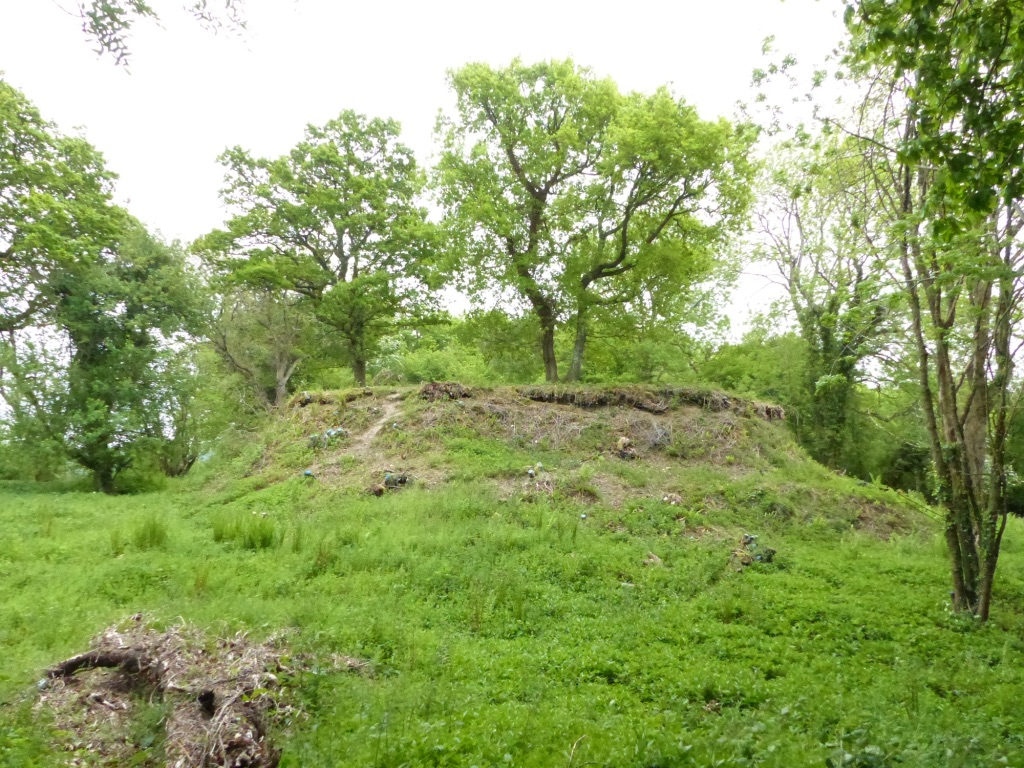
Mouse Castle, Cusop

There are two castles associated with the village: Cusop Castle and Mouse Castle, or Llygad.

Cusop Castle is 200 yards from St. Marys church in Cusop. The castle was formerly a fortified residence.

Mouse Castle is an unfinished motte-and-bailey earthwork, consisting of a rock boss with an artificially scarped vertical side. The castle was held by the de Clanowe family in the 14th century.

== Cusop History Group (CHG) ==
CHG is a local history group, formed in 2015, with the aim of preserving the history of Cusop. They organise public talks, visits, walks, and undertake projects.

In 2025, the group were successful in gaining grants from the Heritage Lottery and the Hay Community Enterprise CIC. The funding was partially used for topographic and geophysical surveys on the Cusop Castle site and St. Mary’s churchyard.

Professional archaeologists from Herefordshire Archaeology conducted the surveys. A detailed report was produced by Herefordshire Archaeology which identified six locations for small-scale excavations at the Cusop Castle site. The location of the excavations was informed by the surveys and ancient maps.

Cusop Castle a Scheduled Ancient Monument (no. 1017253) is on private property. In 2026, with the permission of the owner, the remainder of the funding was used for the first (and probably the only) field work on the site. Professional archaeologists from Herefordshire Archaeology partnered by the Archaeology Company and assisted by 112 volunteers from the community collaborated on the "Digging for Cusop" project. For each of the twenty three-hour sessions, there were up to twenty volunteers per session. The dig was led by County archaeologist Tim Hoverd, previously the director of the excavations at Snodhill Castle, Merlins's Cave etc.

The initial dig findings were presented in a public talk in Cusop by Tim. He revealed that no castle masonry exists on the site, suggesting the location may have never been completed or used as a military fortification. The site follows a common pattern in the Welsh Marches, where earthworks were constructed but abandoned before stone castle fortifications were added. The findings suggest that the site transitioned into an area for medieval industrial activity and subsequent residential or agricultural use. The main findings include:

- Possible Medieval Forge: Traces of a furnace and slag were discovered over a metre below the surface, dating back to the 13th or 14th century.
- Substantial Stone Wall: A well-built stone wall was found cut into the bank closest to the church. Rather than a castle, this is believed to belong to a later 17th-century building or a Tudor-period wall running beneath the stone path.
- Historic Trackway: The team uncovered a compacted stone road accompanied by a drainage channel, perfectly matching the alignment of a 1772 estate map.
- Artifacts & Ceramics: Excavators recovered green and brown medieval glazed pottery, alongside later 17th to early 19th-century ceramics and animal bones.
- Marl Pit: A significant depression in the ground was identified as an old marl pit, which locals used to extract gravelly soil for making cement and later was filled with household waste.

The final report is due to be published in December 2026.

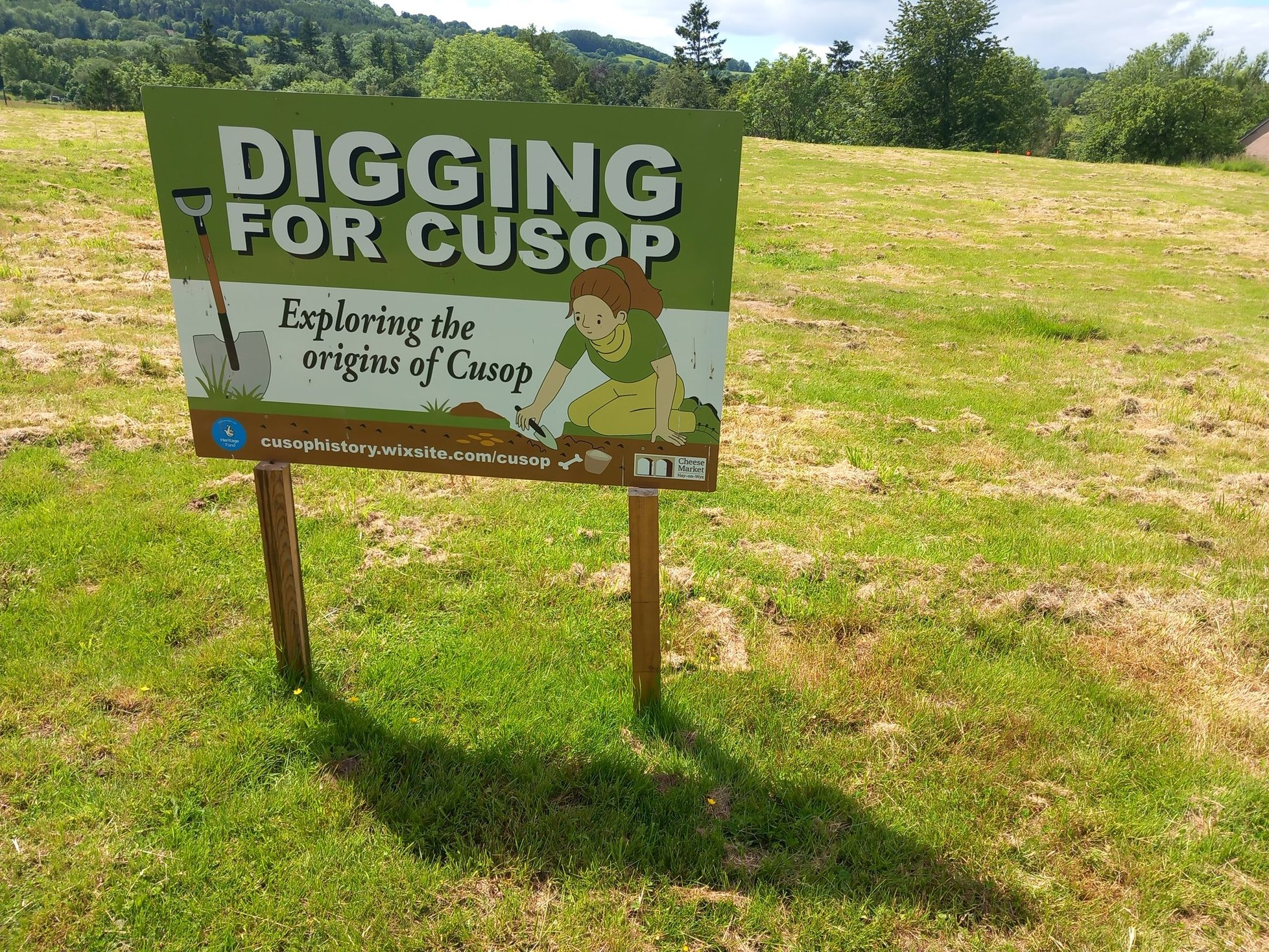
Entrance to Cusop Castle Ringwork - 5th -14th June 2026

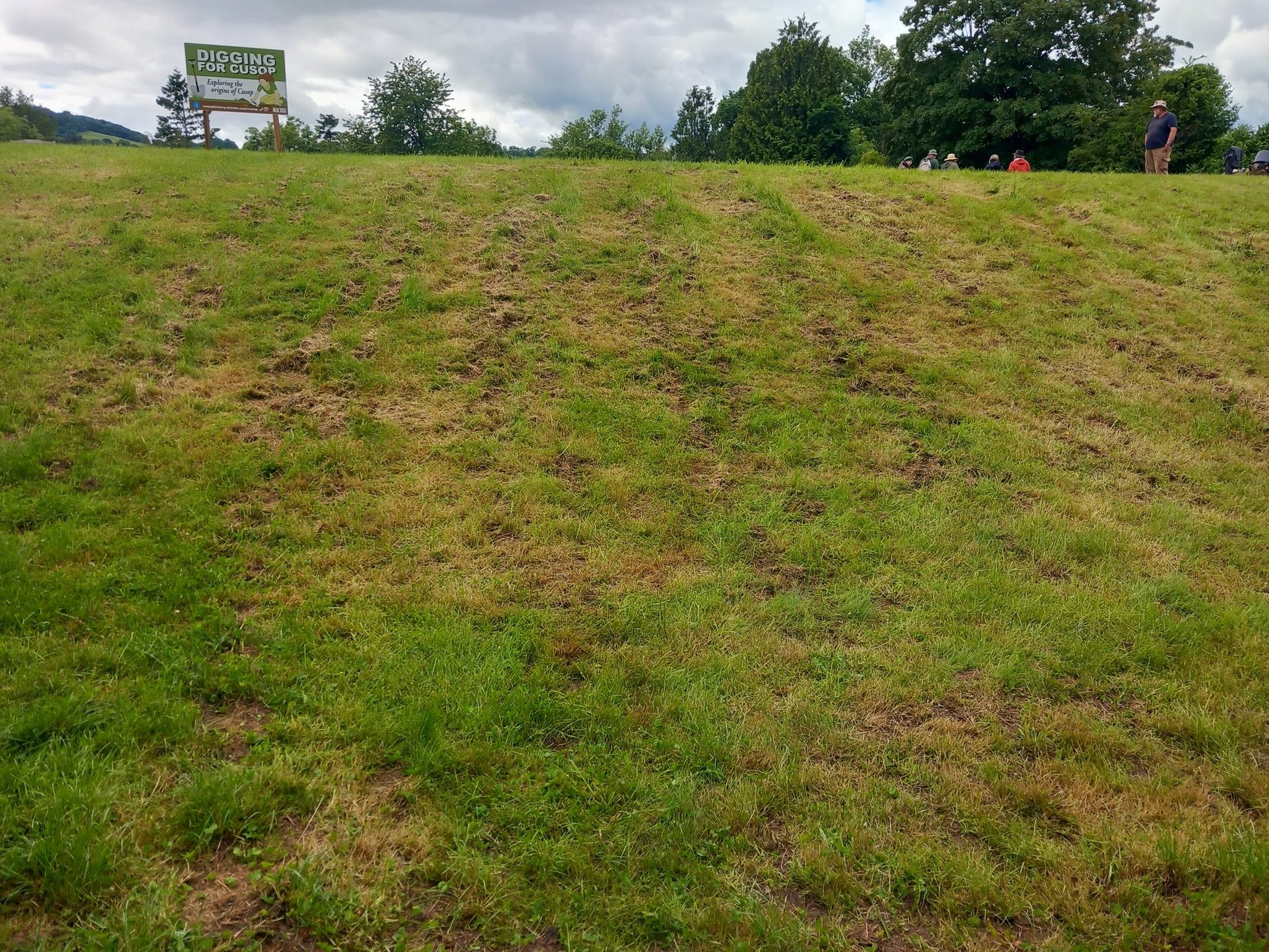
Looking up at the ringwork from ground level.

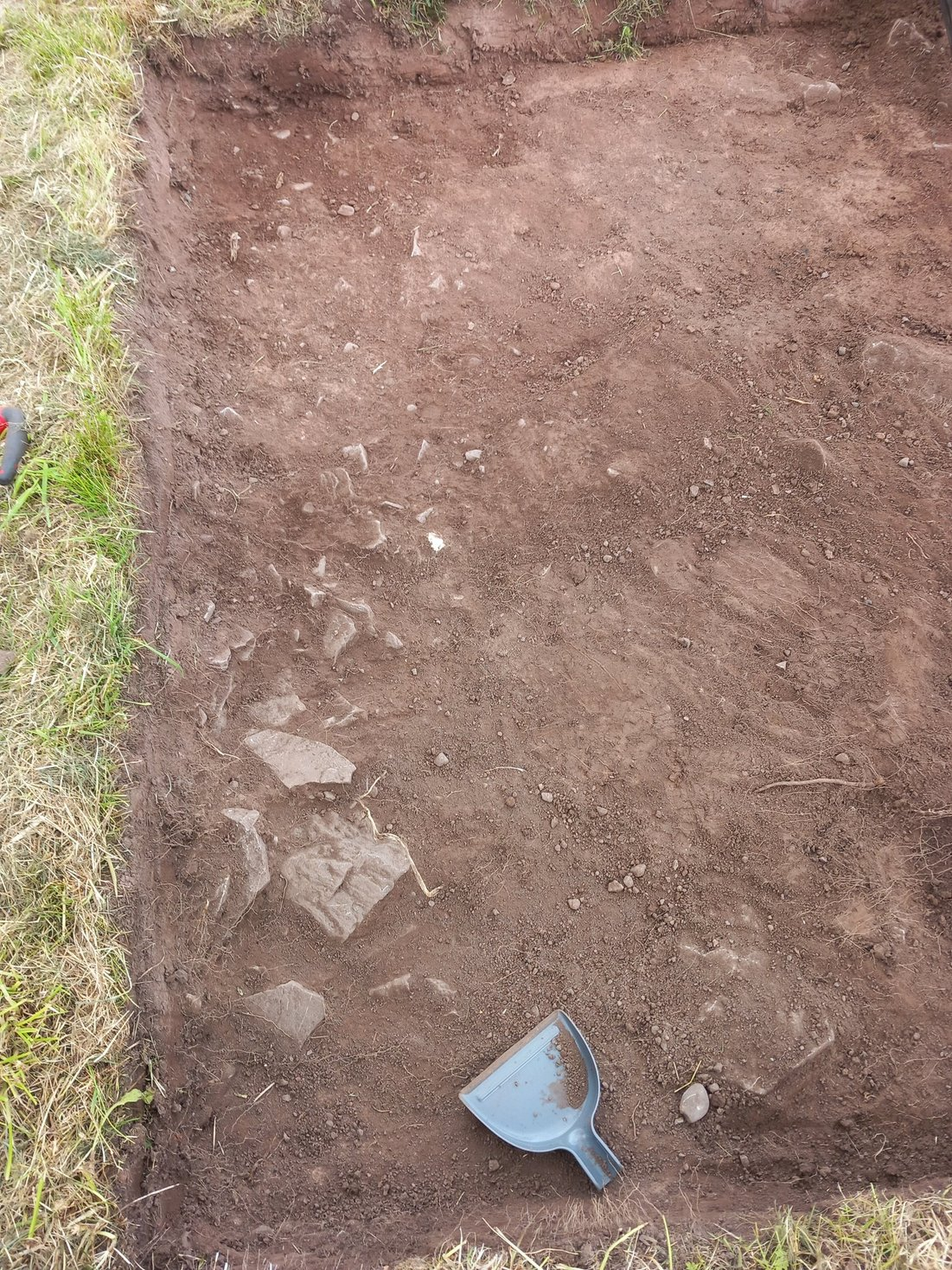
Day 1 - Trench 1 - Early evidence of two walls of a building

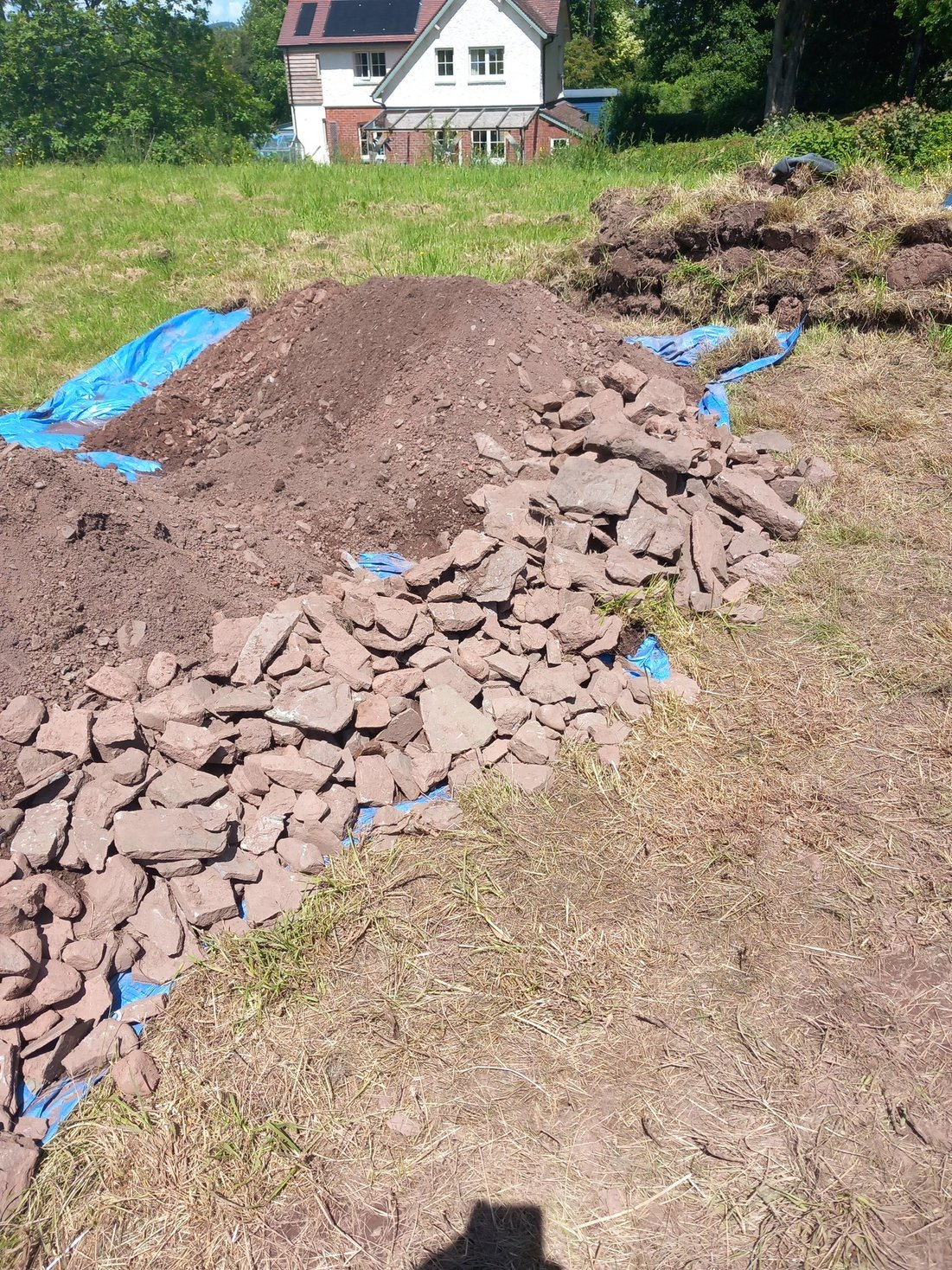
Day 1 - Each trench produced turf, spoil and rubble heaps after turf removal and mattocking.

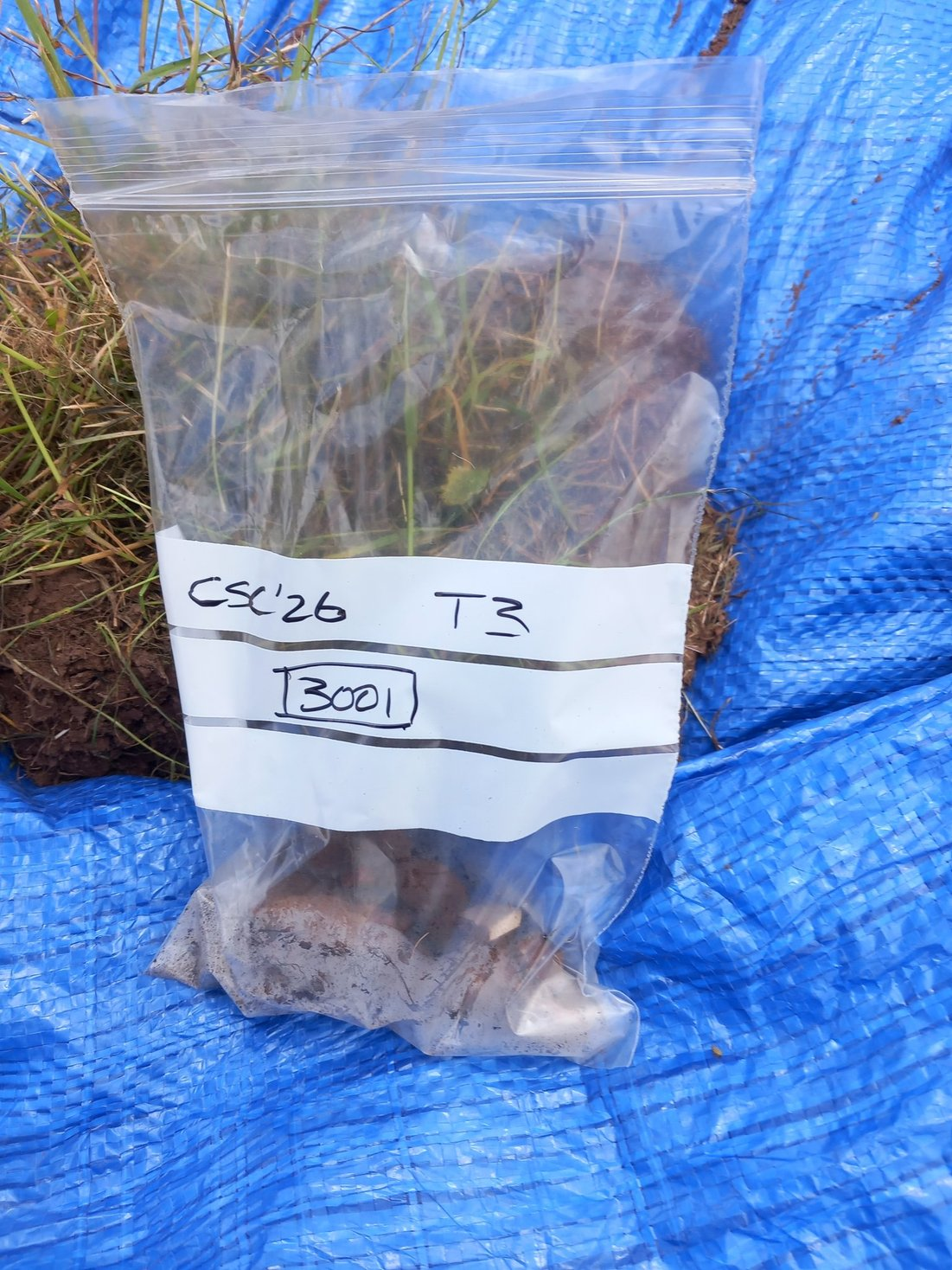
Day 1 - Trench 3 - First findings are from the Victorian period. Charcoal and coal suggest a pit used for the burning of domestic rubbish.

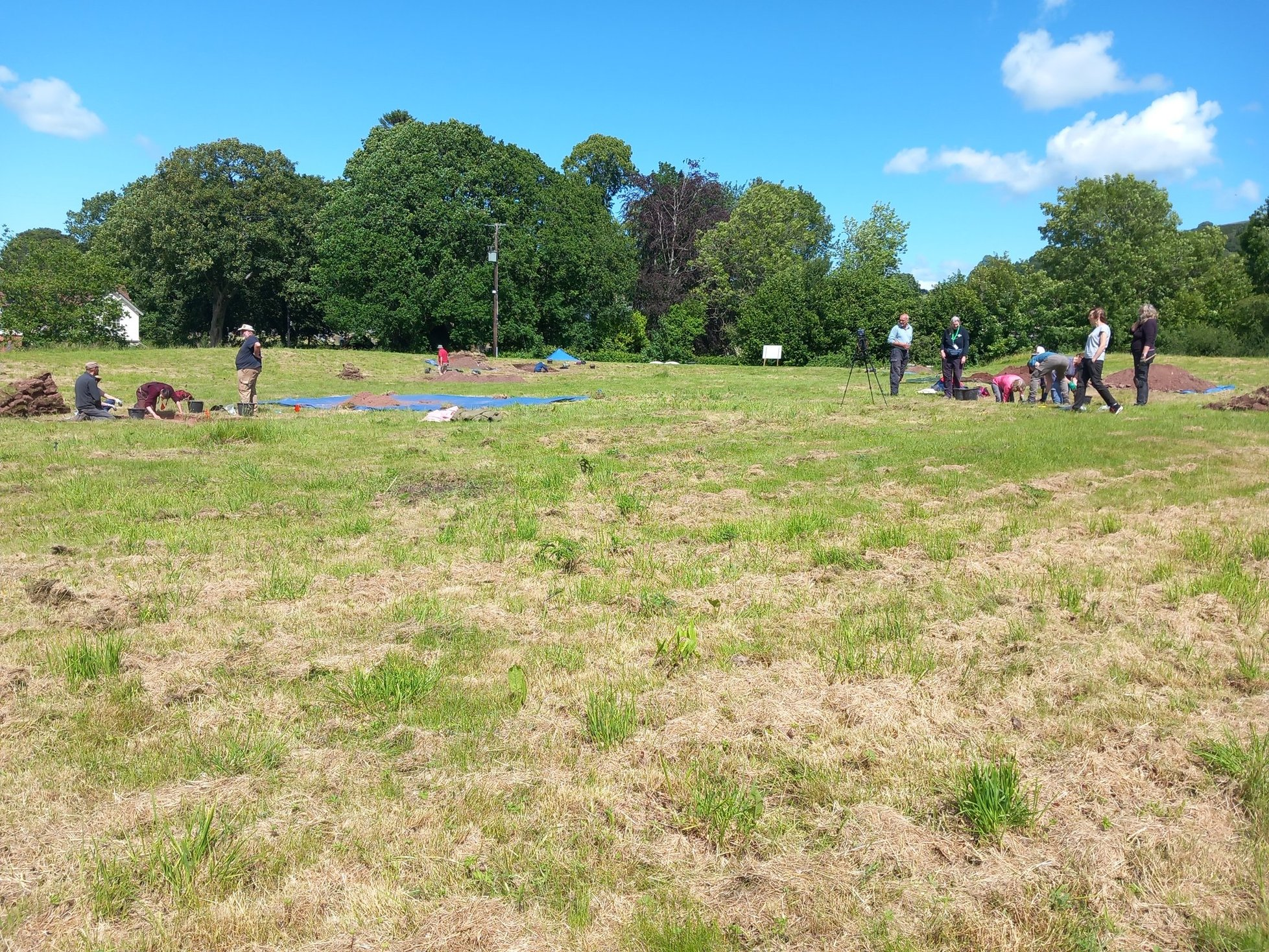
Day 4 - Three trenches with associated turf, spoil and rubble heaps.

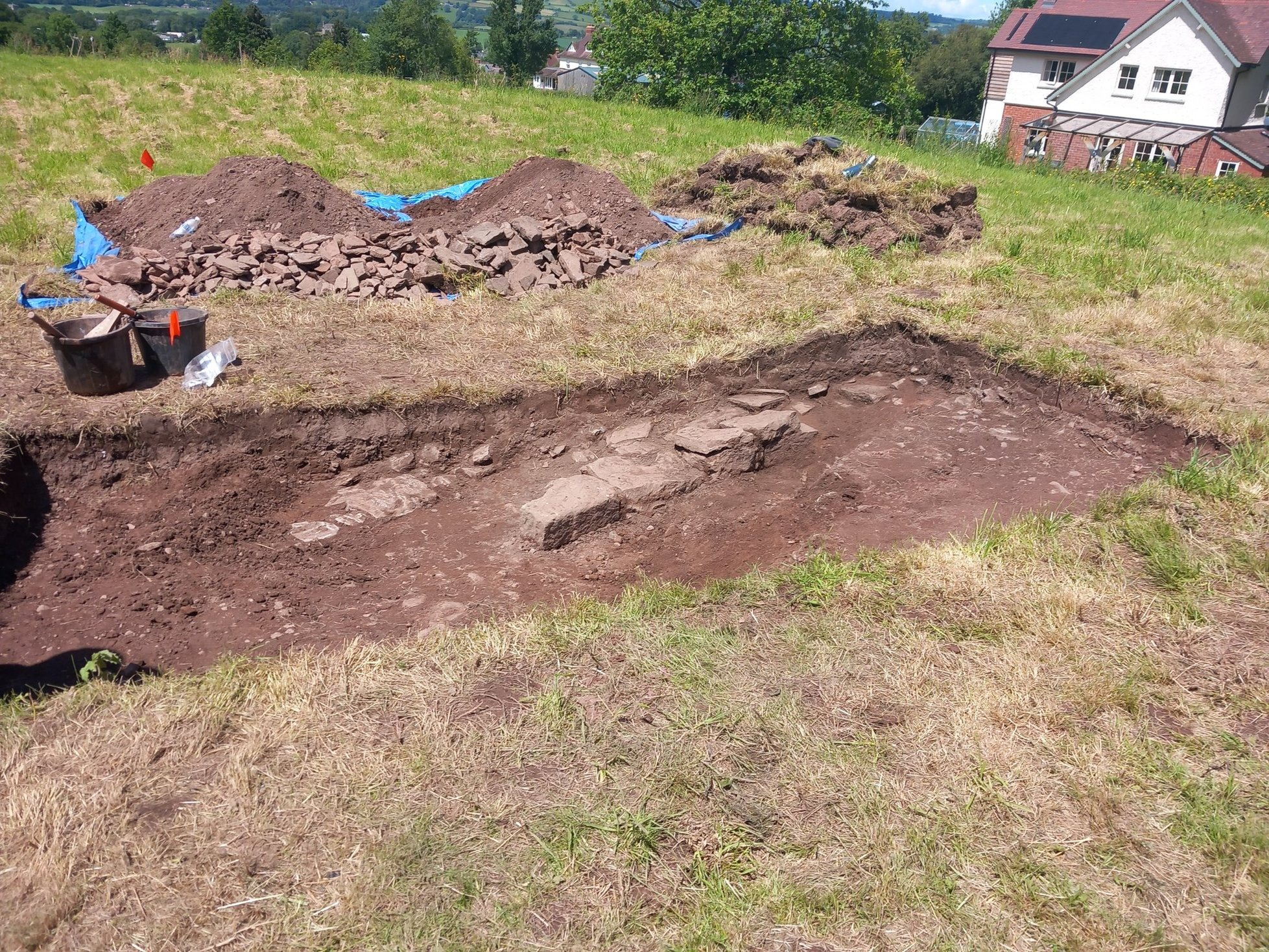
Day 4 - Trench 1 - Walls revealed in day 1 are part of a building, confirming primary sources.

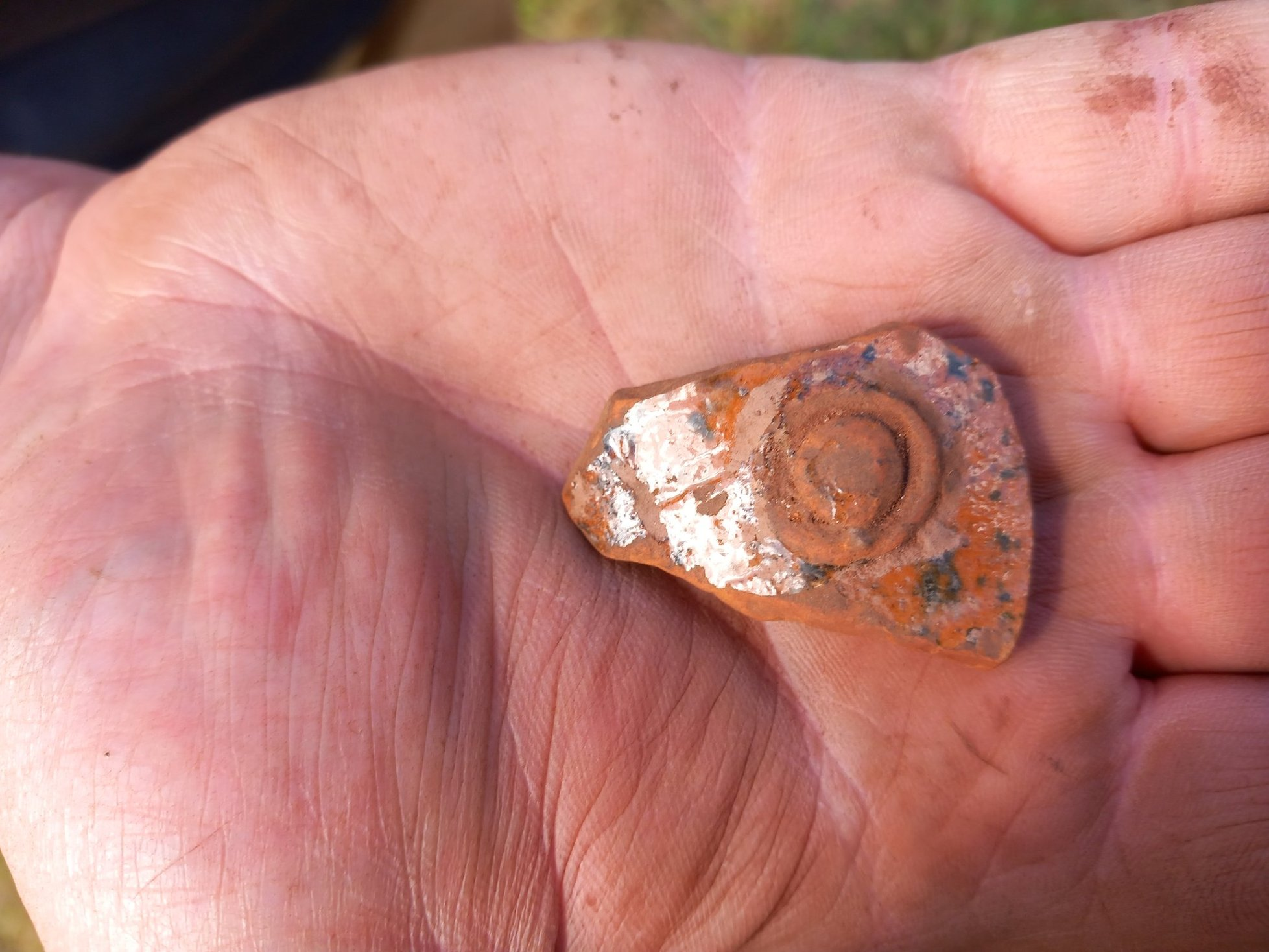
Day 4 - Trench 2 - Potential medieval pottery sherd, glazed with copper oxide ornamentation.

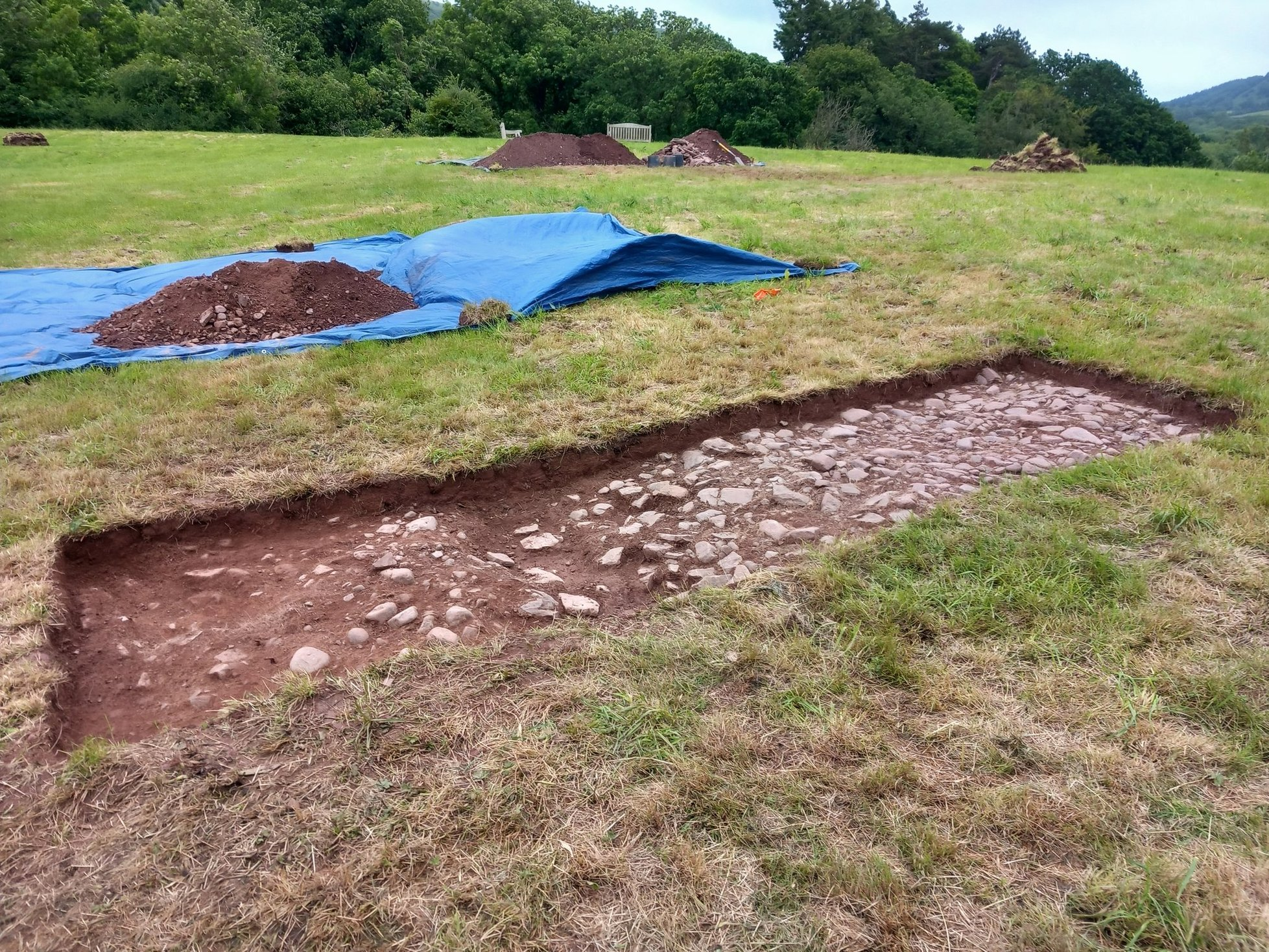
Day 6 - Confirmation of the road shown on the ancient map. It runs through the middle of the ringwork with a drainage channel.

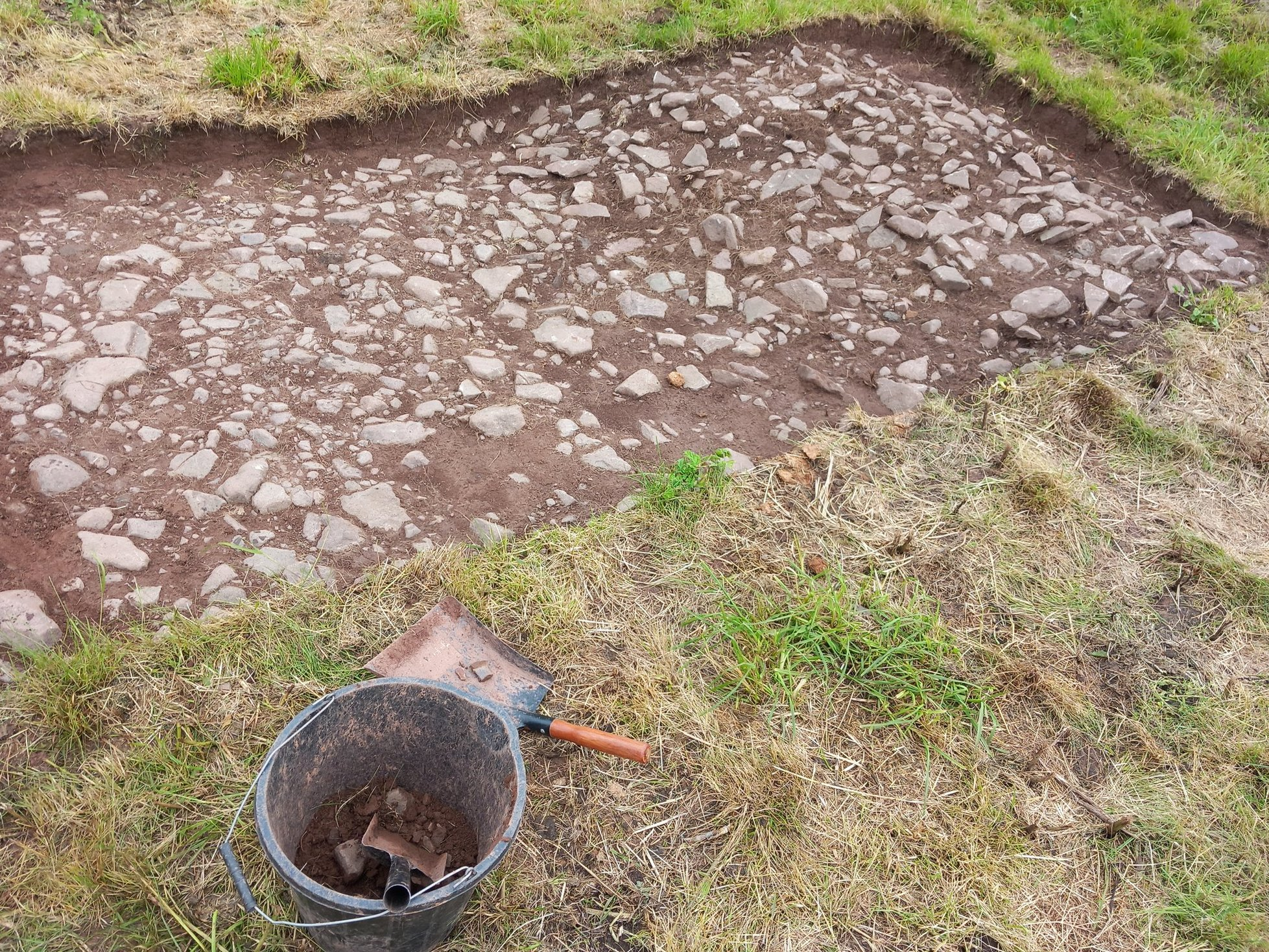
Day 6 - More confirmation of the road shown on the ancient map. This section joins with the section at the other side of the site (with the drainage channel).

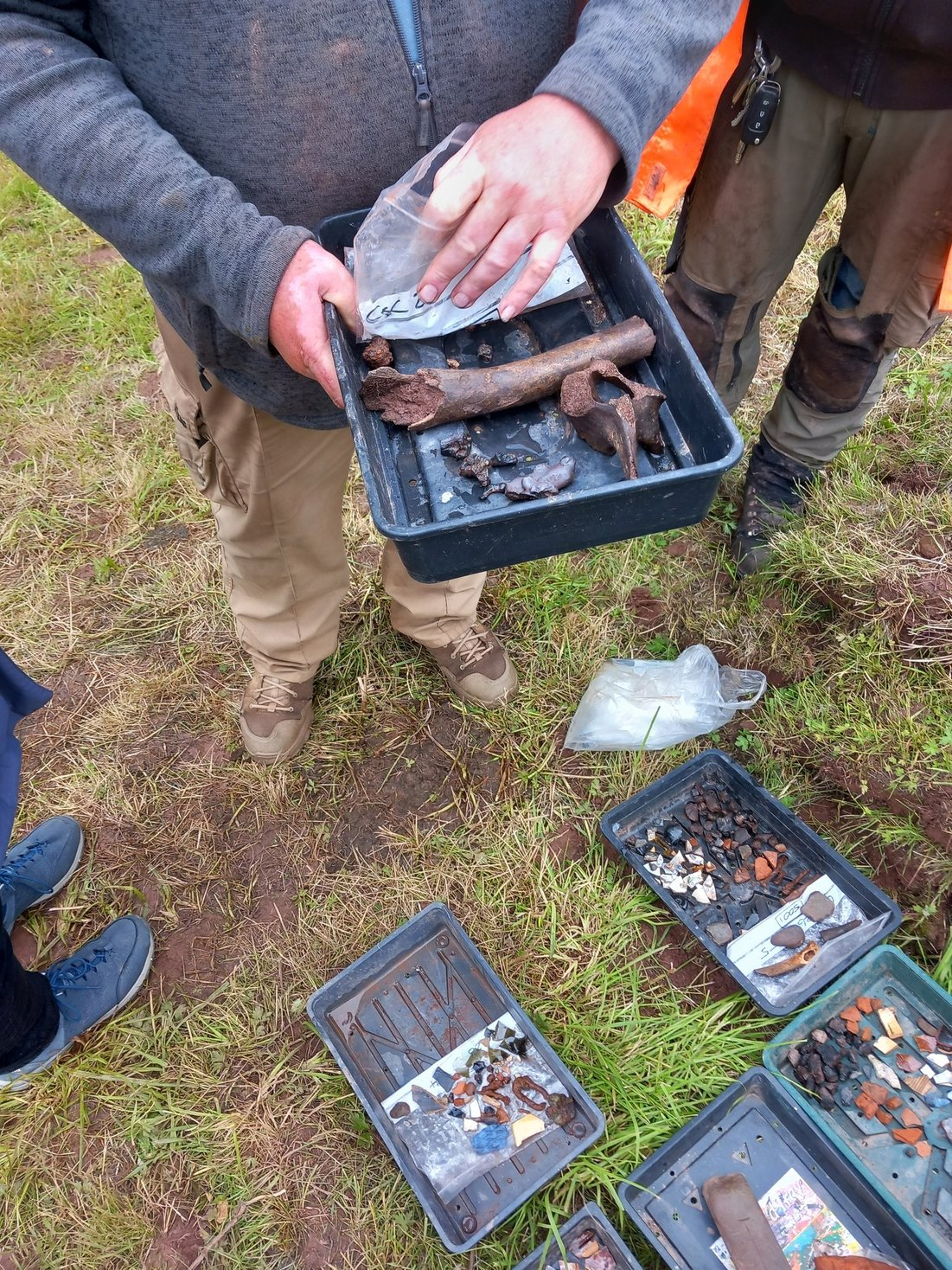
Day 6 - The accumulative finds from the six trenches include three medieval sherds (two glazed), bones, a tooth, sherds from the period the house existed etc.

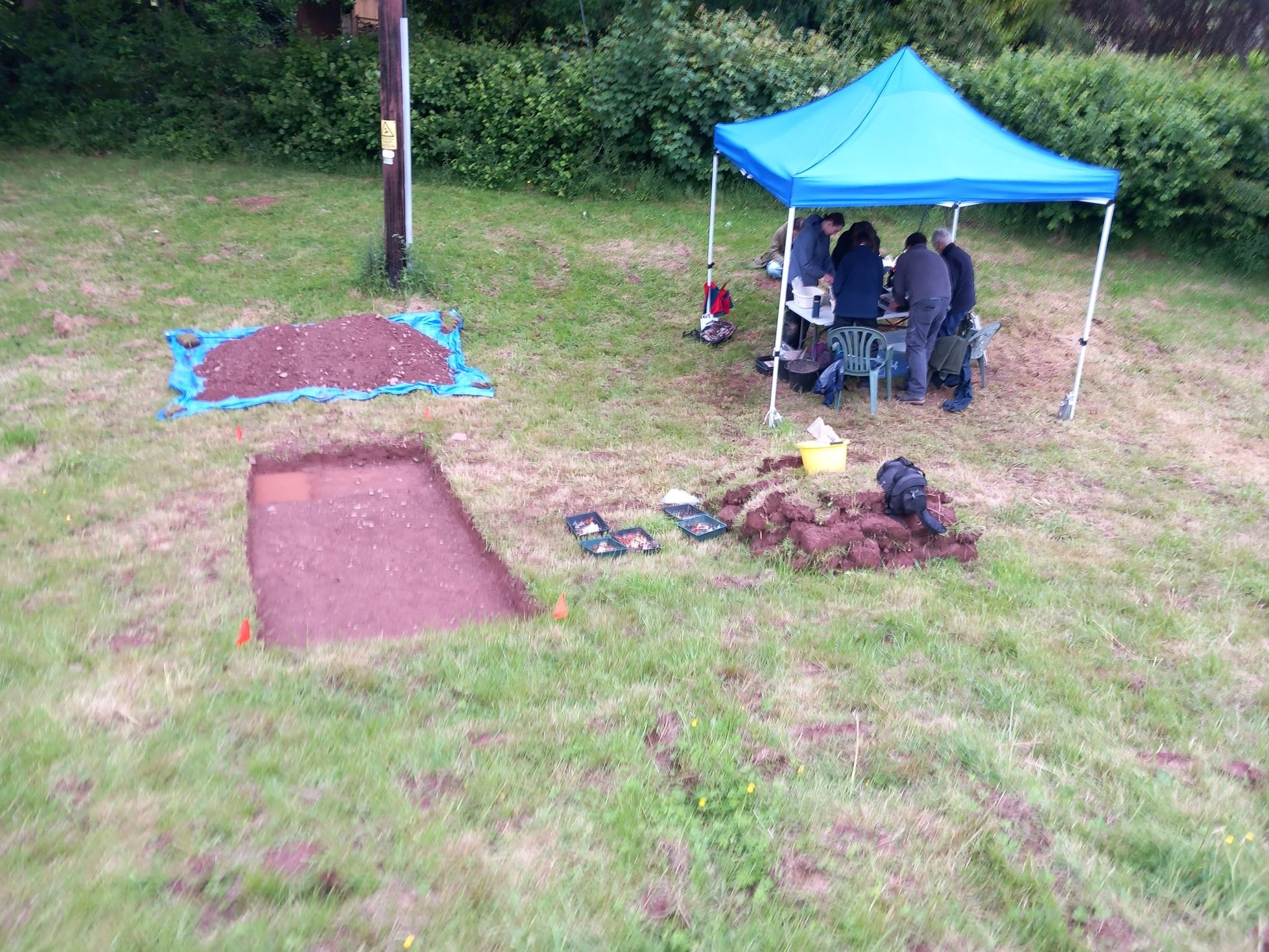
Day 6 - Cleaning the finds after rainfall had converted the trenches to mud-baths and deeper cuts filled with standing water.

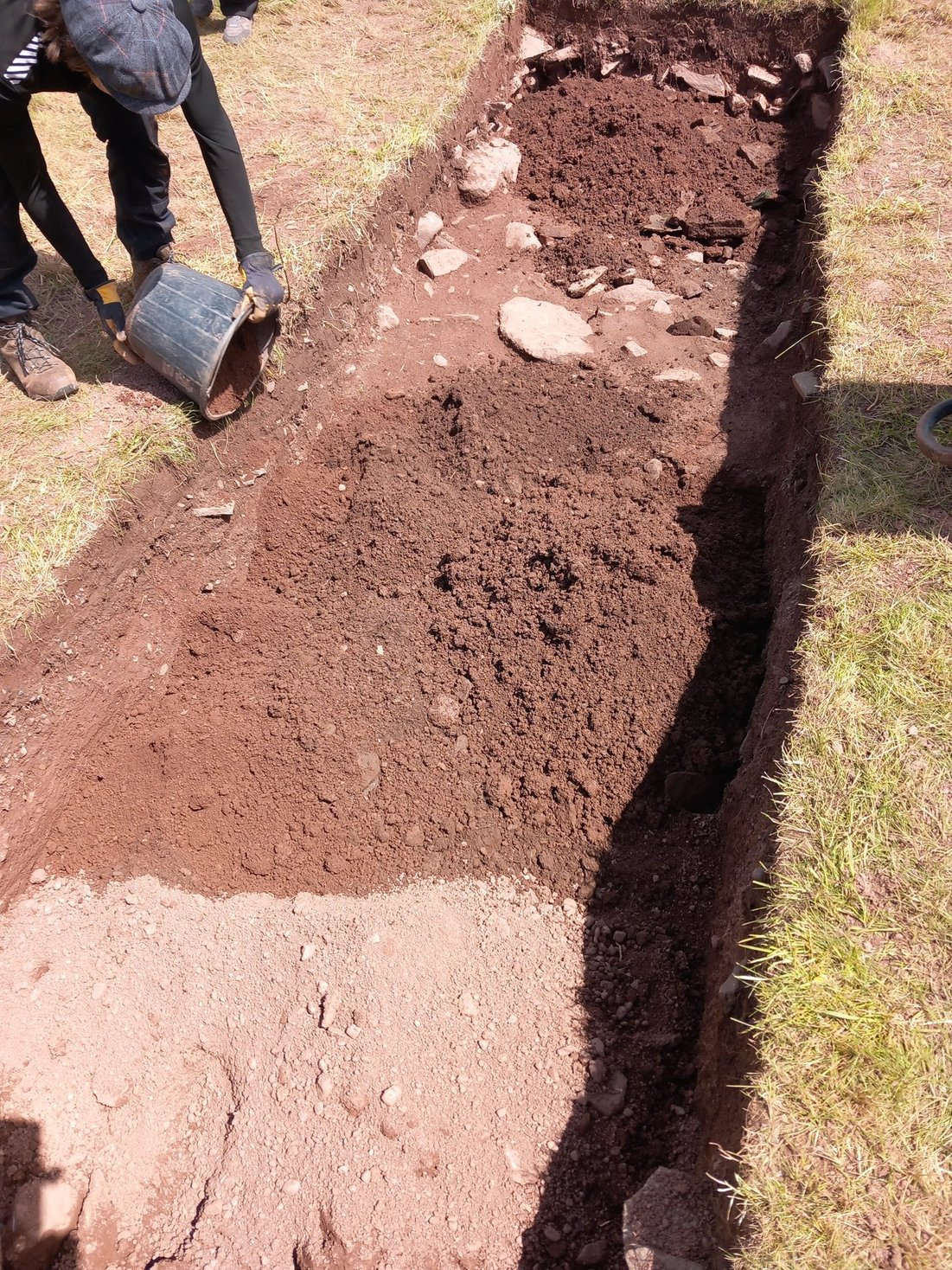
Days 8 to 10 - Backfilling of the trenches by transferring spoil heap and rubble into the original trench.

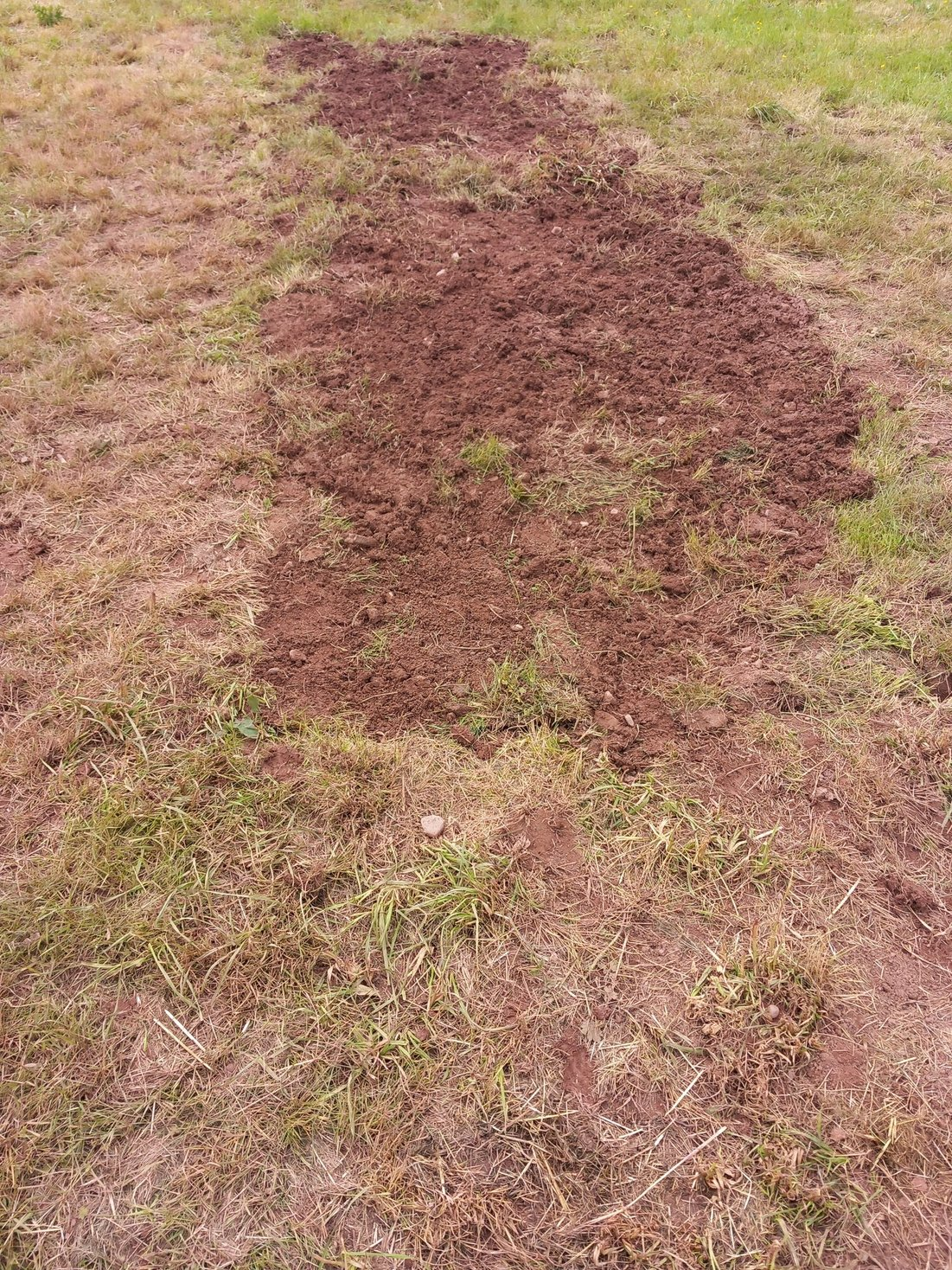
Days 8 to 10 - Backfilled trenches. Meadow grass will soon grow back.

== Geology ==
The bedrock is Old Red Sandstone (often referred to as the 'ORS') consisting of Upper Silurian strata overlain by the Lower Devonian. In the upper reaches of Cusop is a notable geological horizon known as the Townsend Tuff Bed, which is a volcanic air-fall ash band. Today this is a marker used in the Anglo-Welsh ORS area to divide the Silurian from the Devonian. Previously the calcrete zone "often quarried for limestone" was considered as the boundary between the Silurian and Devonian. These inorganically formed calcrete limestones were formerly known as the Psammosteus Limestones but now known as the Bishops Frome Limestone.

The rock sequences have been studied by many geologists in the 19th and 20th centuries. Perhaps one of the first was Roderick Murchison who travelled this way in the early 1830s in search of material for his book The Silurian System. He notes the quarrying and even an attempt to find coal in the side of Cusop Hill near 'The Criggy' circa 1800 by a tenant of Sir George Cornewalle. The rocks hereabouts do have blackish colourings in places of very early plant life and even primitive fishes have been found but mostly as disarticulated remains. Fish scales, boney plates and scales are usually found in pellety gritty beds.

Errol White and Harry Toombs of the Natural History Museum in London looked over the area in the 1930/40s for fossil fishes; many now reside in that museum. Although Murchison was one of the first to make notes of fossils here, other geologists past and present have looked over the area.
