= Geoffrey Cornewall =

British archer (1869–1951)

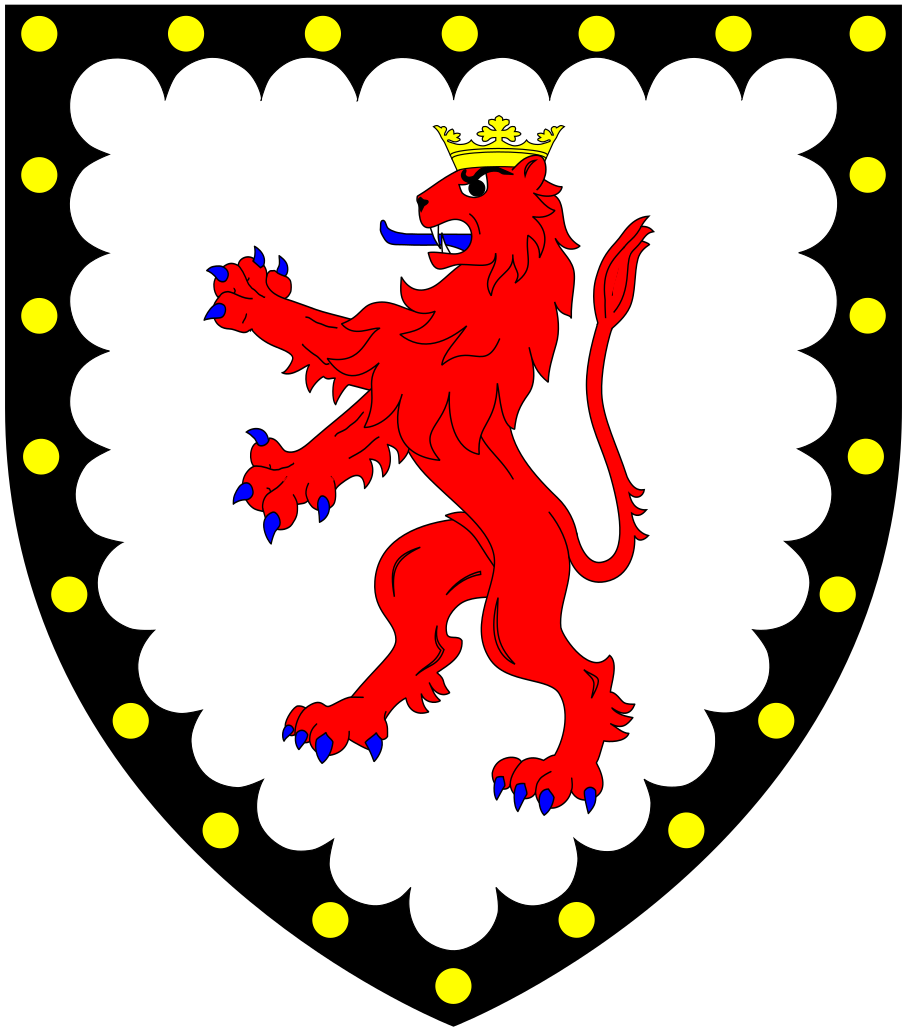
Arms of Cornewall: Argent, a lion rampant gules ducally crowned or a bordure engrailed sable bezantee, being the arms of Richard, 1st Earl of Cornwall (1209–1272) with difference a bordure engrailed

Sir Geoffrey Cornewall, 6th Baronet (7 May 1869 – 21 January 1951) of Moccas Court, Herefordshire, was a British archer who competed at the 1908 Summer Olympics in London.

== Origins ==
He was born at Moccas Court, Moccas, in Herefordshire. He was educated at Eton College and then at Trinity Hall, Cambridge, where he was a member of the Pitt Club.

== Archery career ==
Cornewall entered the double York round event in 1908, taking 15th place with 430 points. He also participated in the Continental style event but his result is unknown.

== Political career ==
He succeeded his father to the Cornewall Baronetcy on 25 September 1908. He was a Justice of the Peace and Deputy Lieutenant for Herefordshire and was appointed High Sheriff of Herefordshire in 1913 and Vice Lord-Lieutenant in 1934. He was an Alderman of the Herefordshire County Council.

Baronetage of Great Britain
Preceded by George Cornewall	Baronet (of Moccas Court); 1908–1951	Succeeded by William Cornewall
