= Moccas Court =

Country house in Moccas, Herefordshire, England

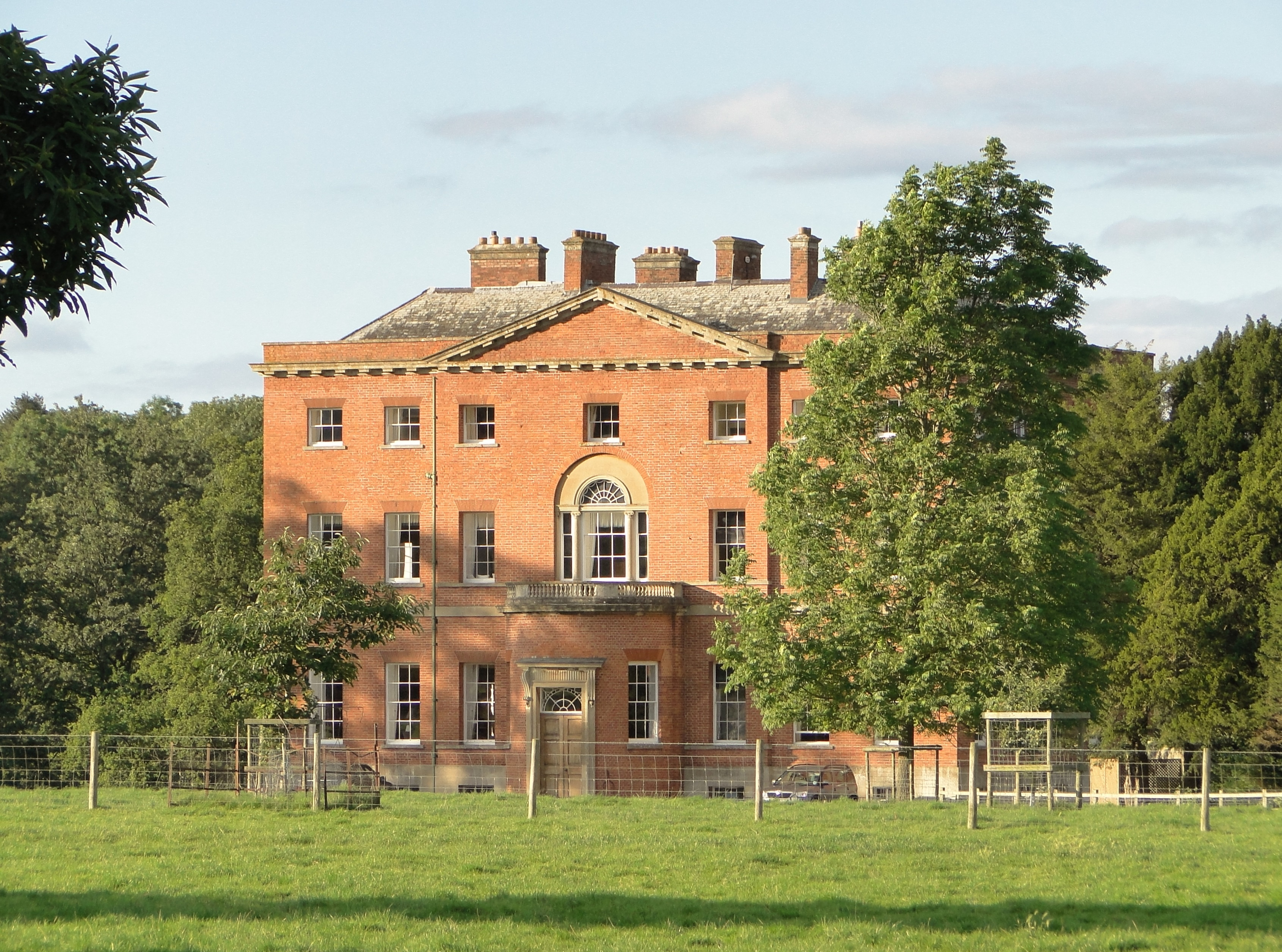

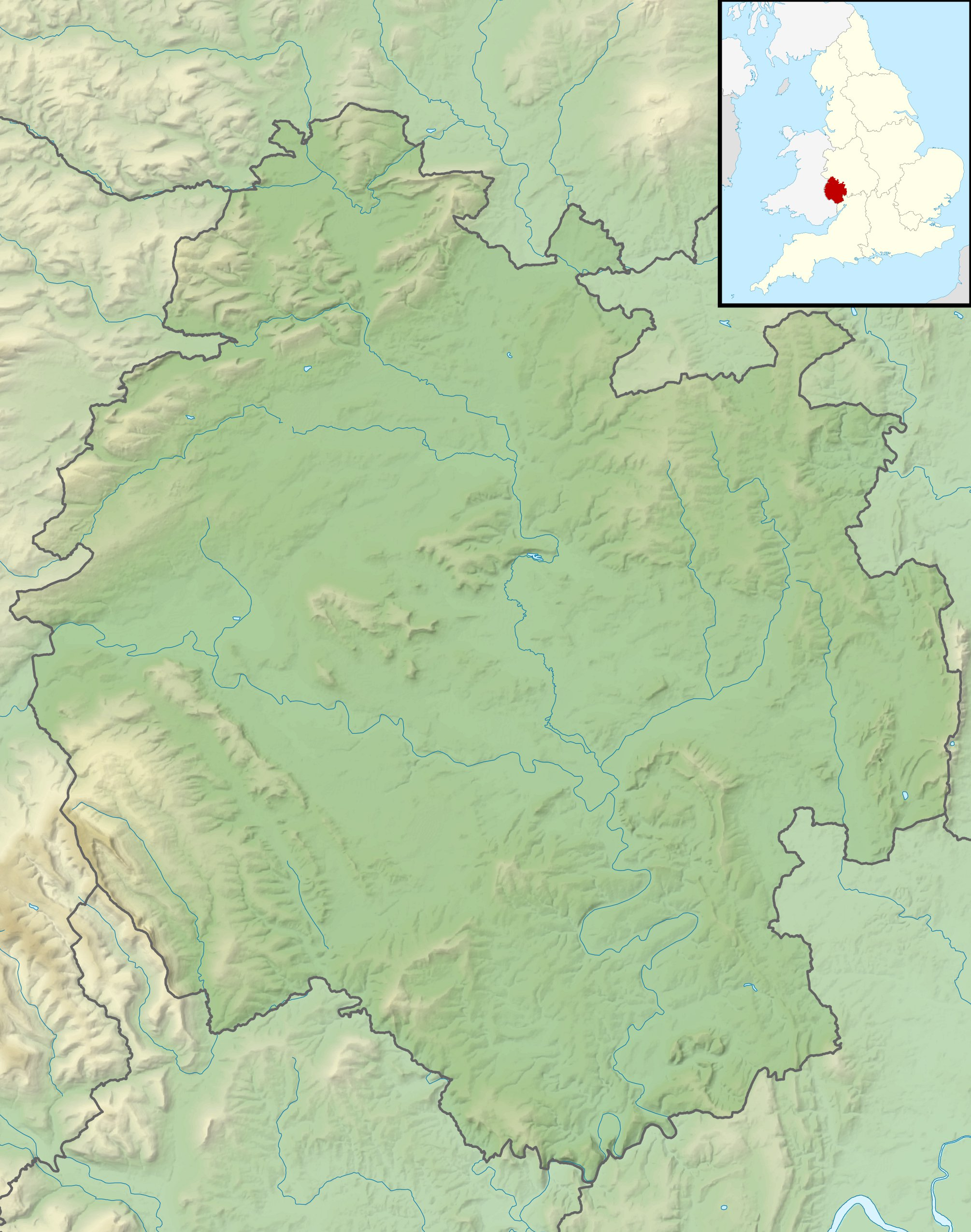
- Location within Herefordshire
- 52.0864°N 2.9388°W
- Type: Country house
- Location: Moccas, Herefordshire

History
- Built: 1775-1781

Site notes
- Architect: Anthony Keck
- Architectural style: Georgian
- Owner: Linda Bennett

Listed Building – Grade I
- Official name: Moccas Court
- Designated: 2 September 1966
- Reference no.: 1081852

Listed Building – Grade II*
- Official name: Estate Building, Home Farmhouse
- Designated: 23 September 1987
- Reference no.: 1081853

Listed Building – Grade II
- Official name: Home Farmhouse
- Designated: 23 September 1987
- Reference no.: 1157798

Listed Building – Grade II
- Official name: Barn at Home Farmhouse
- Designated: 23 September 1987
- Reference no.: 1157804

Listed Building – Grade II
- Official name: Bridge Lodge
- Designated: 23 September 1987
- Reference no.: 1301425

Listed Building – Grade II
- Official name: Dawe Lodge
- Designated: 23 September 1987
- Reference no.: 1349850

Moccas Court is an 18th-century country house which sits in sloping grounds overlooking the River Wye north of the village of Moccas, Herefordshire, England.

The house was built in 1775–81 by the architect Anthony Keck for Sir George Amyand Cornewall to replace the existing Manor house near the church. Built in three storeys to a rectangular plan, it was constructed of brick with stone dressings and a stone tile roof. It has a seven bay frontage with a single storey semi-circular plan porch which was added in 1792. The grounds were landscaped to plans by Capability Brown. The house is a Grade I listed building.

The Cornewall family occupied Moccas until 1916 when Sir Geoffrey Cornewall, the 6th Baronet, moved to a smaller house on the estate, after which the house was let on a long lease. After death of Sir William Cornewall, the 7th Baronet in 1962, the estate passed to the Chester-Master family who owned the house until 2014. It was then sold to Linda Bennett, founder of the fashion house L.K.Bennett.
