= Moccas =

Village in Herefordshire, England

Coordinates: 52°05′N 2°56′W

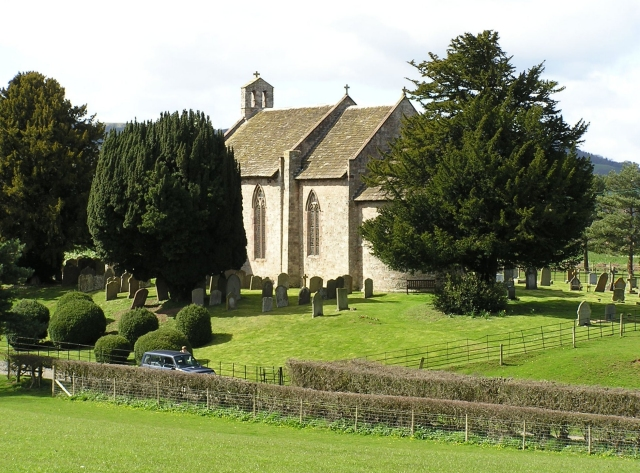
- St Michael's parish church in Moccas

- Location within Herefordshire
- Population: 105 (2011 Census)
- Unitary authority: Herefordshire
- Shire county: Herefordshire
- Region: West Midlands
- Country: England
- Sovereign state: United Kingdom
- Post town: Hereford
- Postcode district: HR2
- Police: West Mercia
- Fire: Hereford and Worcester
- Ambulance: West Midlands
- UK Parliament: Hereford and South Herefordshire

Moccas is a village and civil parish in the English county of Herefordshire. It is located 14 miles (23 km) west of Hereford. The population of the civil parish taken at the 2011 census was 105.

The parish is mainly farmland with a number of woods, including Woodbury Hill Wood and the Moccas Park Deer Park (though mostly in Dorstone parish). The parish church of St Michael is well known as the site of the very early Welsh Moccas Monastery, founded by Saint Dubricius in the 6th century, as recorded in the Book of Llandaff. The church has a notable monument to the de Fresnes family, lords of the manor in the 14th century.

Moccas Court, north of the village, replaced the old manor house which once stood next to the church. It is a fine Georgian country house, now a hotel, built between 1776 and 1783 for the Cornewall family by the architect Anthony Keck.

The name Moccas probably derives from the Welsh Moch-rhos, meaning pig land, according to the Moccas village history website. Geiriadur yr Academi / The Welsh-English Academy Dictionary (University of Wales Press 1995) lists Moccas, glossed as "English Place name", and gives the Welsh form as "Mochros". "Moch" (pigs) and "rhos" (moorland) combine to give "moch-ros" (soft mutation of RH > R, caused by the preceding word, hence "Mochros" /ˈmɔχrɔs/).
