= Platypeza anthrax =

Scientific classification
- Domain: Eukaryota
- Kingdom: Animalia
- Phylum: Arthropoda
- Class: Insecta
- Order: Diptera
- Family: Platypezidae
- Genus: Platypeza
- Species: P. anthrax

Binomial name
- Platypeza anthrax Loew, 1869

Synonyms
- Platypeza elongata Banks, 1915

Species of fly

Platypeza anthrax is a species of flat-footed flies (insects in the family Platypezidae).
