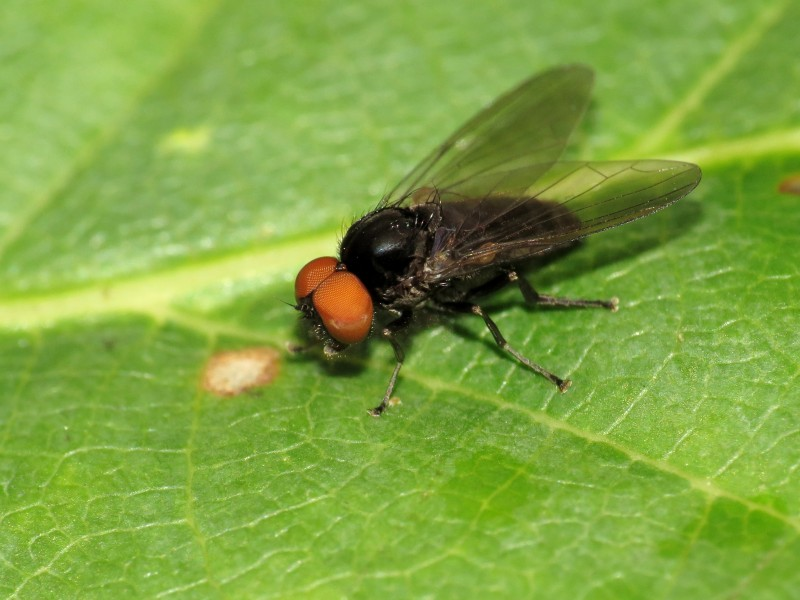
- Platypeza consobrina

Scientific classification
- Kingdom: Animalia
- Phylum: Arthropoda
- Clade: Pancrustacea
- Class: Insecta
- Order: Diptera
- Family: Platypezidae
- Subfamily: Platypezinae
- Genus: Platypeza; Meigen, 1803

Type species
- Clythia dymka Meigen, 1803

Synonyms
- Clythia Meigen, 1800; Pachypeza Lioy, 1863; Platypezoides Johnson, 1923; Platyptera Panzer, 1809

= Platypeza =

Genus of flies

Platypeza is a genus of flat-footed flies (insects in the family Platypezidae). There are at least 30 described species in Platypeza.

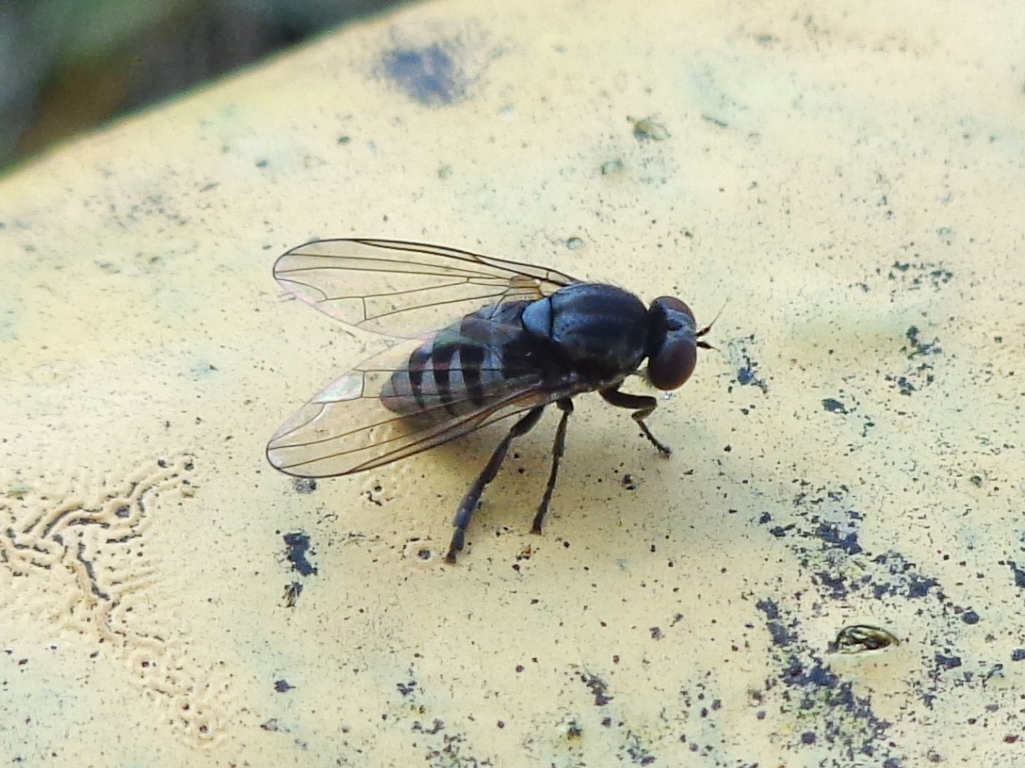
Platypeza hirticeps

== Species ==
These 32 species belong to the genus Platypeza:

- Platypeza alternata Kessel and Kessel, 1967^{i c g}
- Platypeza anthrax Loew, 1869^{i c g b}
- Platypeza aterrima Walker, 1835^{c g}
- Platypeza banksi Johnson, 1923^{i c g}
- Platypeza burmensis Chandler, 1994^{c g}
- Platypeza cinerea Snow, 1894^{i c g}
- Platypeza coeruleoceps Matsumura, 1931^{c g}
- Platypeza consobrina Zetterstedt, 1844^{c g}
- Platypeza egregia Snow, 1894^{i c g}
- Platypeza eoa Shatalkin, 1981^{c g}
- Platypeza fasciata Meigen, 1803
- Platypeza femina Kessel and Kessel, 1967^{i c g}
- Platypeza gyrodroma Shatalkin, 1985^{c g}
- Platypeza hirticeps Verrall, 1901
- Platypeza inornata Loew, 1858^{c g}
- Platypeza lugens Loew, 1858^{c g}
- Platypeza malaisei Chandler, 1994^{c g}
- Platypeza melanostola Shatalkin, 1980^{c g}
- Platypeza mexicana Kessel and Kessel, 1966^{i c g}
- Platypeza millironi Kessel, 1966^{i c g}
- Platypeza nudifacies Shatalkin, 1980^{c g}
- Platypeza nudifascies Shatalkin, 1980^{c g}
- Platypeza obscura Loew, 1866^{i c g}
- Platypeza pulla Snow, 1895^{i c g}
- Platypeza rhodesiensis (Kessel, 1957)^{c g}
- Platypeza sauteri (Oldenberg, 1914)^{c g}
- Platypeza taeniata Snow, 1894^{i c g b}
- Platypeza tephrura Shatalkin, 1985^{c g}
- Platypeza thomasseti Brunnetti, 1929^{c g}
- Platypeza thomseni Shannon, 1927^{c g}
- Platypeza tucumana Shannon, 1927^{c g}
- Platypeza unicolor Snow, 1895^{i c g}

Data sources: i = ITIS, c = Catalogue of Life, g = GBIF, b = Bugguide.net
