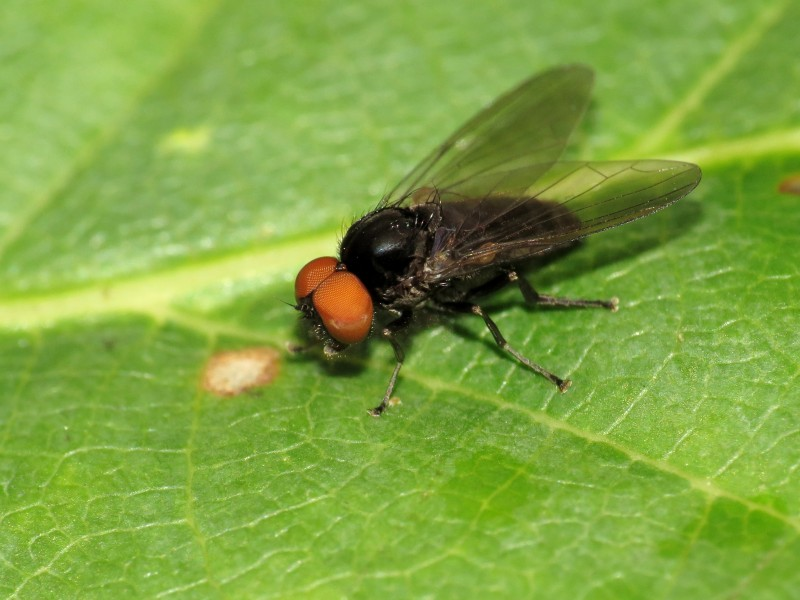
- Platypeza consobrina

Scientific classification
- Domain: Eukaryota
- Kingdom: Animalia
- Phylum: Arthropoda
- Class: Insecta
- Order: Diptera
- Family: Platypezidae
- Genus: Platypeza
- Species: P. consobrina

Binomial name
- Platypeza consobrina Zetterstedt, 1844

Synonyms
- Clythia miki Czerny, 1930; Platypeza barbata Kowarz, 1867

= Platypeza consobrina =

Species of fly

Platypeza consobrina is a species of flat-footed flies in the family Platypezidae.
