= George Cornewall =

British politician

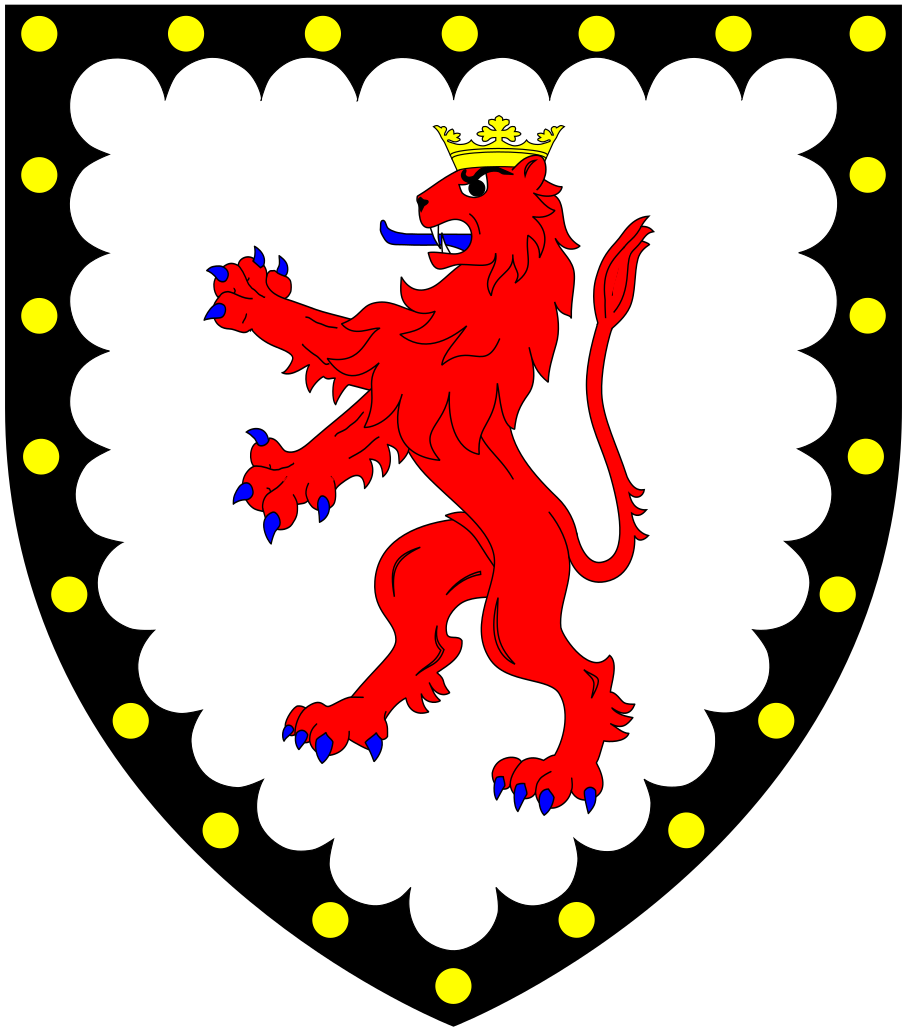
Arms of Cornewall: Argent, a lion rampant gules ducally crowned or a bordure engrailed sable bezantee, being the arms of Richard, 1st Earl of Cornwall (1209–1272) with difference a bordure engrailed

Sir George Cornewall, 2nd Baronet (8 November 1748 – 26 August 1819) of Moccas Court, Herefordshire, was a British politician who sat in the House of Commons between 1774 and 1807.

== Origins ==
Born George Amyand, he was the eldest son and heir of Sir George Amyand, 1st Baronet (1720–1766) by his wife Anna Maria Korteen, daughter of John Abraham Korteen, a Hamburg merchant. In 1766 he succeeded his father as 2nd Baronet and inherited his interest in the banking firm of Amyand, Staples and Mercer.

== Career ==
Amyand was educated at Eton College then at Christ Church, Oxford, where he graduated Master of Arts in 1769. On 18 July 1771 he married Catherine Cornewall, only daughter and heiress of Velters Cornewall of Moccas in Herefordshire, MP. In 1771 he assumed by royal licence the surname and arms of Cornewall in lieu of his patronymic, in accordance with the bequest from his father-in-law, an inheritance which included Moccas Park in Herefordshire. In 1773 he received a Doctorate of Civil Law from the University of Oxford.

Cornewall entered Parliament at the 1774 general election, as member of parliament for Herefordshire and held the seat until 1796. In 1784 he was a member of the St. Alban's Tavern group who tried to bring Fox and Pitt together. He was returned again for Herefordshire in a contest at the 1802 general election and was returned again in 1806. He decided not to face another contest at the 1807 general election. He served in the Herefordshire Militia and became its colonel in 1805.

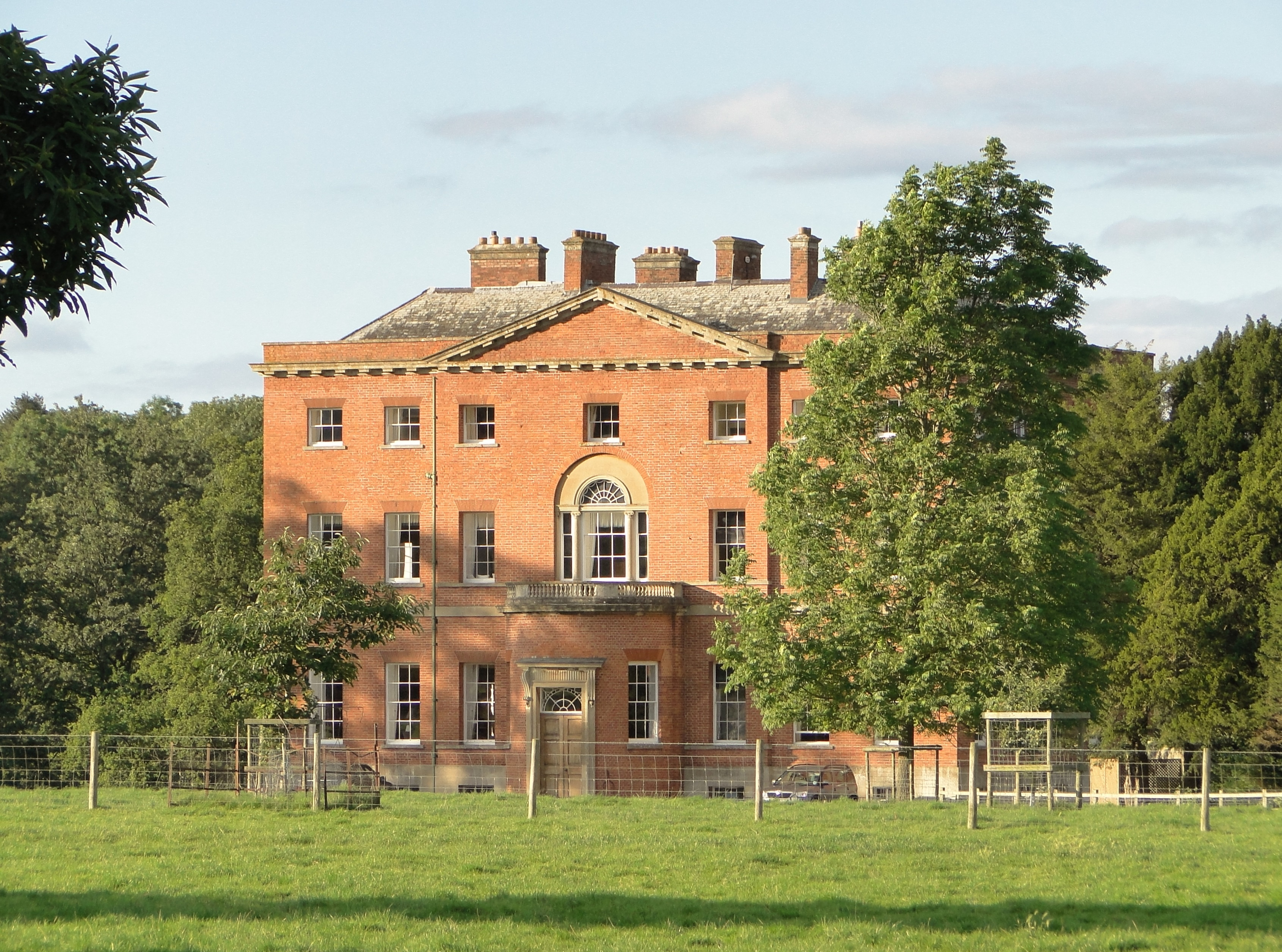
Moccas Court

Cornewall was owner of a plantation in Grenada, West Indies, and in 1775–81 rebuilt Moccas Court, the family's inherited residence in Herefordshire. He inherited Mouse Castle, Cusop but exchanged it. In 1800, he sold Frilsham, Berkshire, which his father had purchased in 1762, to Robert Hayward.

He served as a Family Trustee of the British Museum from 1788 until his death.

== Later years and family ==
Cornewall died in 1819 and was buried at Moccas. By his wife Catherine, he had two sons and six daughters:

- Catherine-Frances Cornewall (1773–1826), married Samuel Peploe of Garnstone Castle, Weobley 15 March 1796.
- Sir George Cornewall, 3rd Baronet (1774–1835), eldest son and heir.
- Hannah Cornewall (died young)
- Anna-Maria Cornewall (1779–1872)
- Frances-Elizabeth Cornewall (1783–1864), married Henry Devereux, 14th Viscount Hereford, 12 December 1805.
- Charles Cornewall (1785–1822).
- Harriet Cornewall (1787–1838), married Thomas Frankland Lewis, 12 January 1805.
- Caroline Cornewall (1789–1875), married Sir William Duff-Gordon, 5 February 1810

Catherine Cornewall's family claimed descent from a younger branch of the de Cornewall family, Barons of Burford, lineally descended from Sir Richard of Cornwall (d.1296, slain by an arrow at the Siege of Berwick), a natural son of Richard, 1st Earl of Cornwall (1209–1272), (2nd son of King John) by his mistress Joan de Bath. Sir Richard of Cornwall married Joan FitzAlan, daughter of John FitzAlan, 6th Earl of Arundel, and by her had three sons and a daughter. His daughter, Joan of Cornwall, married Sir John Howard, from whom the Howard family, Dukes of Norfolk, are descended. The arms of de Cornwall were: Argent, a lion rampant gules ducally crowned or a bordure engrailed sable bezantee, being the arms of Richard, 1st Earl of Cornwall with difference a bordure engrailed.

Parliament of Great Britain
Preceded by Thomas Foley; Thomas Foley	Member of Parliament for Herefordshire; 1774–1796; With: Thomas Foley 1774–1776; Thomas Harley 1776–1796	Succeeded by Robert Biddulph; Thomas Harley
Parliament of the United Kingdom
Preceded by Robert Biddulph; Thomas Harley	Member of Parliament for Herefordshire; 1802–1807; With: Sir John Geers Cotterell 1802–1803; John Matthews 1803–1806; Sir John Geers Cotterell 1806–1807	Succeeded by Sir John Geers Cotterell; Thomas Foley
Baronetage of Great Britain
Preceded by George Amyand	Baronet (of Moccas Court); 1766–1819	Succeeded by George Cornewall
