= Cornewall baronets =

Escutcheon of the Cornewall baronets of Moccas Court

The Amyand, later Cornewall baronetcy of Moccas Court, in the County of Hereford, was created in the Baronetage of Great Britain on 9 August 1764 for George Amyand, who was a Member of Parliament (MP) for Barnstaple in the House of Commons of Great Britain.

== Amyand, later Cornewall baronets, of Moccas Court (1764) ==
- Sir George Amyand, 1st Baronet (1720–1766)
- Sir George Cornewall, 2nd Baronet (1748–1819): assumed the surname and arms of "Cornewall" by royal licence in 1771
- Sir George Cornewall, 3rd Baronet (1774–1835)
- Sir Velters Cornewall, 4th Baronet (1824–1868)
- Sir George Henry Cornewall, 5th Baronet (1833–1908)
- Sir Geoffrey Cornewall, 6th Baronet (1869–1951)
- Sir William Francis Cornewall, 7th Baronet (1871–1962)

Baronetage of Great Britain
Preceded by Moore baronets	Amyand baronets of Moccas Court; 9 August 1764	Succeeded by Duncan baronets
