= Moccas Monastery =

Priory in Herefordshire, England

Coordinates: 52.0836°N 2.9392°W

Moccas Monastery was an early mediaeval monastery near Moccas in Herefordshire, England at grid reference SO35654327. Neither the foundation nor dissolution date is known.
