= L.K.Bennett =

Fashion brand based in London, England

LK Bennett

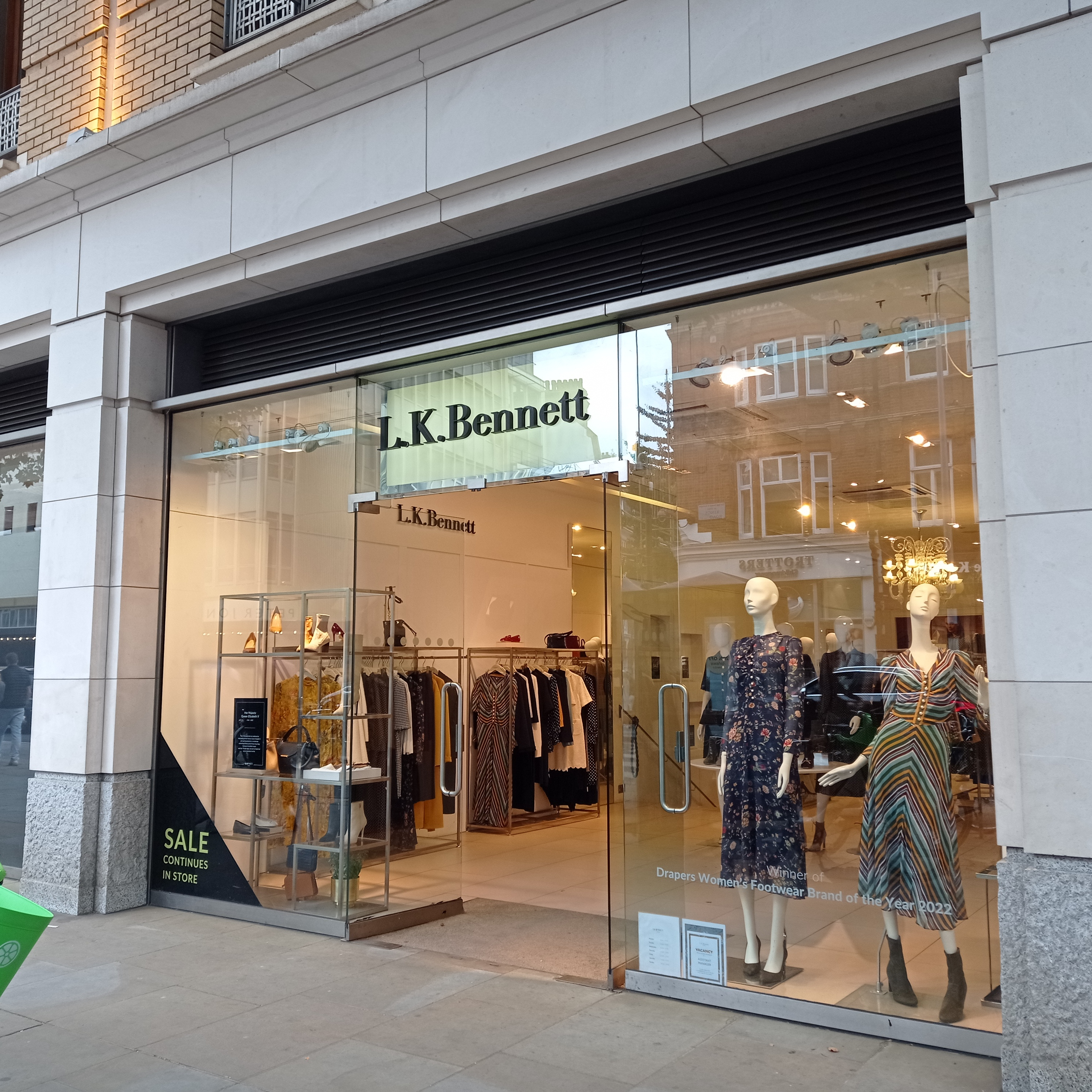
- Branch in Chelsea, London
- Type: Private company
- Industry: Fashion design and retail
- Founded: 1990; 36 years ago
- Founder: Linda Bennett
- Headquarters: London, England
- Number of locations: 9 in total. United Kingdom, France, Netherlands, Spain, United Arab Emirates, United States
- Key people: Linda Bennett
- Owner: Gordon Brothers
- Website: lkbennett.com

LK Bennett is a British luxury fashion brand based in London, England. The company sells ready-to-wear collections incorporating clothing, shoes, handbags and accessories.

== History ==
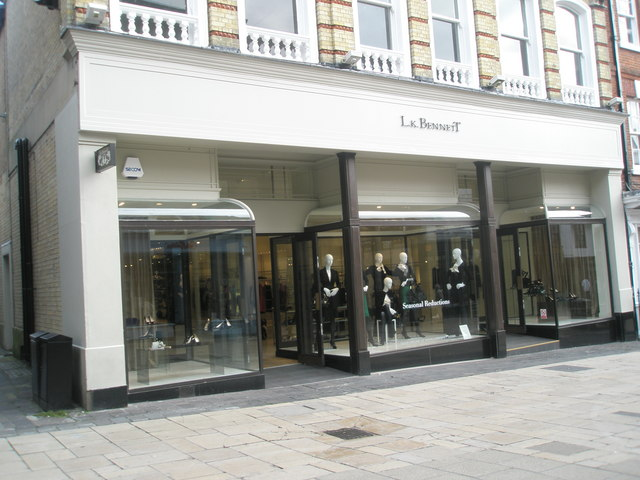
LK Bennett store in Winchester, Hampshire

Linda Bennett set up the first LK Bennett shop in Wimbledon Village in 1990, with a goal to produce "something in-between the designer footwear you find in Bond Street and those on the high street". The company’s success led Bennett to earn the nickname "Queen of the Kitten Heel.”

In 1998 Bennett created her first ready-to-wear collection and started overseas expansion, opening a boutique in Paris in 2000. She then opened stores and concessions in Spain, the Netherlands, the United Arab Emirates, and the United States, including in-store concessions in chains including Harvey Nichols, Selfridges, John Lewis, Fenwick, Printemps, and Galeries Lafayette.

In November 2004, Bennett appointed BDO Stoy Hayward to find strategic investors. Bennett sold a 70% stake in the business in 2008 to Phoenix Equity Partners and Sirius Equity, a retail and branded luxury goods investment company, in a deal believed to have netted her around £100m. Bennett remained on the board of the company as a non-executive director, and retained a stake of about 30 per cent.

In April 2017 the brand announced that Linda Bennett would be returning to its helm with a focus on product and brand development. In September 2017 she bought out the company.

As of June 2018, the company had 130 stores globally. Online sales made up 33% of total sales, stores 61%, and wholesale 6%.

The company went into administration on 7 March 2019. It was reported that up to 500 jobs could be at risk as administrators EY closed five outlets on being appointed, two in London as well as the stores in Sheffield, Bristol, and Liverpool. On 12 April 2019 LK Bennett was bought out of administration, saving 325 jobs.

However, 15 of the retailer's stores are not included in the deal and will close, leading to the loss of 110 jobs.

In November 2018, LK Bennett launched a new US website in USD, and a site in Euros supporting 29 European countries.

In March 2019, LK Bennett was bought by Byland UK.

In December 2025, it was widely reported that the company was being put up for sale.

In January 2026, the company has been purchased out of administration by Gordon Brothers.

== In popular culture ==
In April 2018, British Home Secretary Amber Rudd declared that Britain's application system for EU nationals who want to remain in the UK after Brexit should be "as easy as setting up an online account at LK Bennett".

It has been widely reported that the Catherine, Princess of Wales was a fan of the company's products.

== See also ==
- List of companies based in London
