= Linda Bennett =

English-Icelandic clothing designer and entrepreneur

Linda Bennett OBE
- Born: 8 September 1962 (Age 63); London, United Kingdom
- Education: London College of Fashion; Reading University
- Occupations: Clothing designer and entrepreneur
- Known for: Founder of LK Bennett

Linda Kristin Bennett OBE (born 8 September 1962) is an English clothing designer and entrepreneur, best known for founding the fashion retailer L.K.Bennett.

== Early life ==
Born in London, Bennett is the daughter of a London-based fashion retail entrepreneur and an Icelandic sculptor mother. She grew up in North West London, and was educated at Kingsbury Green Primary School, Haberdashers' Aske's School for Girls in Elstree and Reading University, where she read Land Management. She then trained as a cordwainer at Hackney's Cordwainers College (now part of the London College of Fashion), and then working for French designer Robert Clergerie, before working on the sales floor of retailers Whistles and Joseph.

== L.K.Bennett ==
Bennett set up her first shop in Wimbledon Village, with a goal to produce "something in-between the designer footwear you find in Bond Street and those on the high street." Bennett designed the Duchess of Cornwall’s wedding shoes for her marriage to Prince Charles in 2005.

Because of her equal emphasis on comfort and glamour, Bennett earned the nickname “Queen of the Kitten Heel”. Bennett sold a 70% stake in the business in 2007 to Phoenix Equity Partners and Sirius Equity, a retail and branded luxury goods investment company, in a deal believed to have netted her around £70m. Bennett remained on the board of the company as a non-executive director and retained a stake of about 30 per cent.

== Honours and awards ==
Since setting up L.K.Bennett, she has won several awards, including: Ernst and Young Entrepreneur of the Year Award (Consumer Product category) in 2002; Best Women's Footwear Retailer (UK Footwear Award) in 2003; Veuve Clicquot Businesswoman of the Year in 2004; Entrepreneurs’ Entrepreneur award in 2009.

In 2004, Bennett was made an honorary fellow of the London College of Fashion, her alma mater, and she sits on the development council of the University of the Arts London, of which the London College of Fashion is a part. In 2006, Bennett was awarded an OBE for services to the fashion industry in the New Year Honours list.
