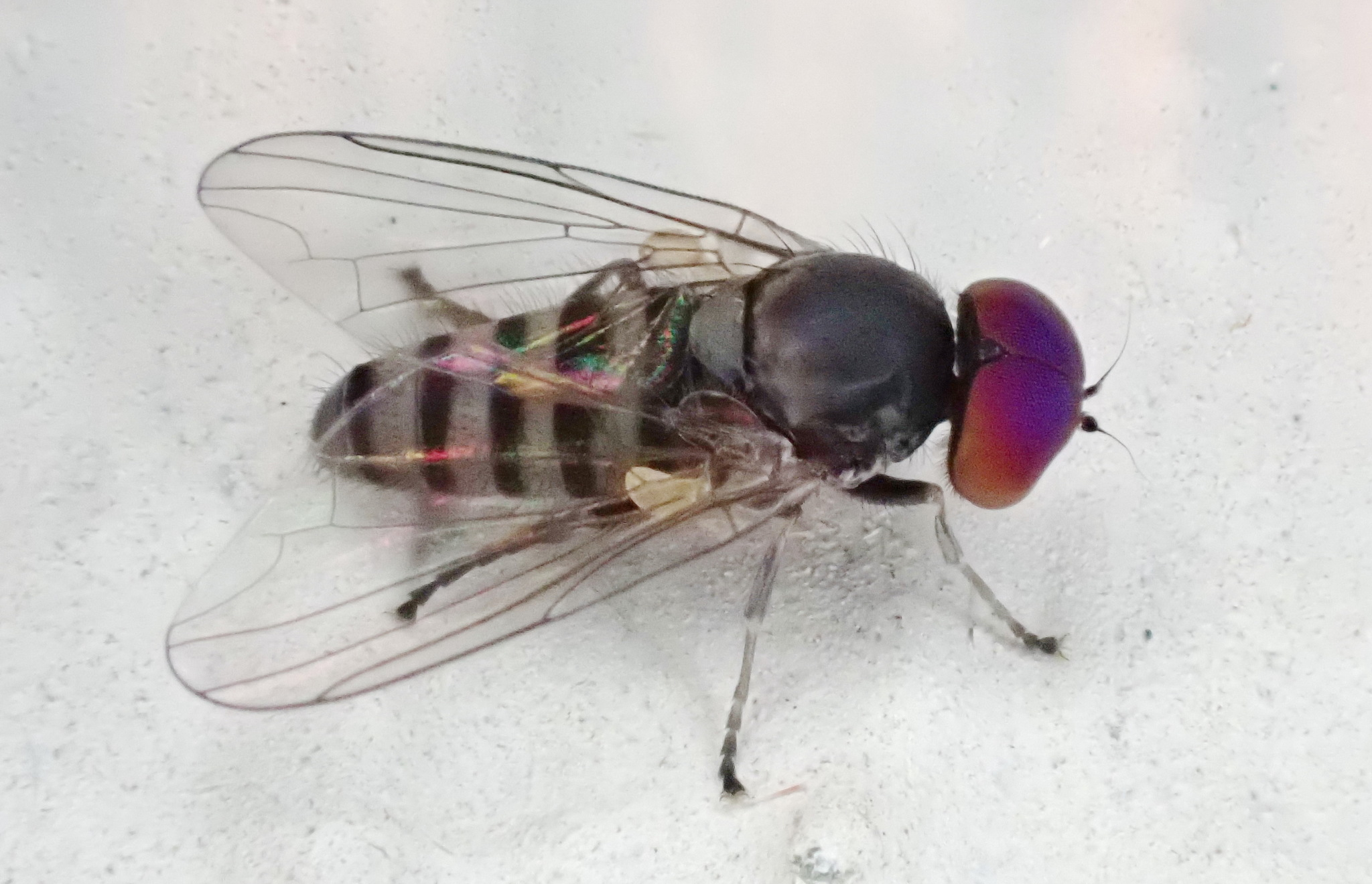

Scientific classification
- Domain: Eukaryota
- Kingdom: Animalia
- Phylum: Arthropoda
- Class: Insecta
- Order: Diptera
- Family: Platypezidae
- Genus: Platypeza
- Species: P. taeniata

Binomial name
- Platypeza taeniata Snow, 1894

= Platypeza taeniata =

Species of fly

Platypeza taeniata is a species of flat-footed fly in the family Platypezidae.
