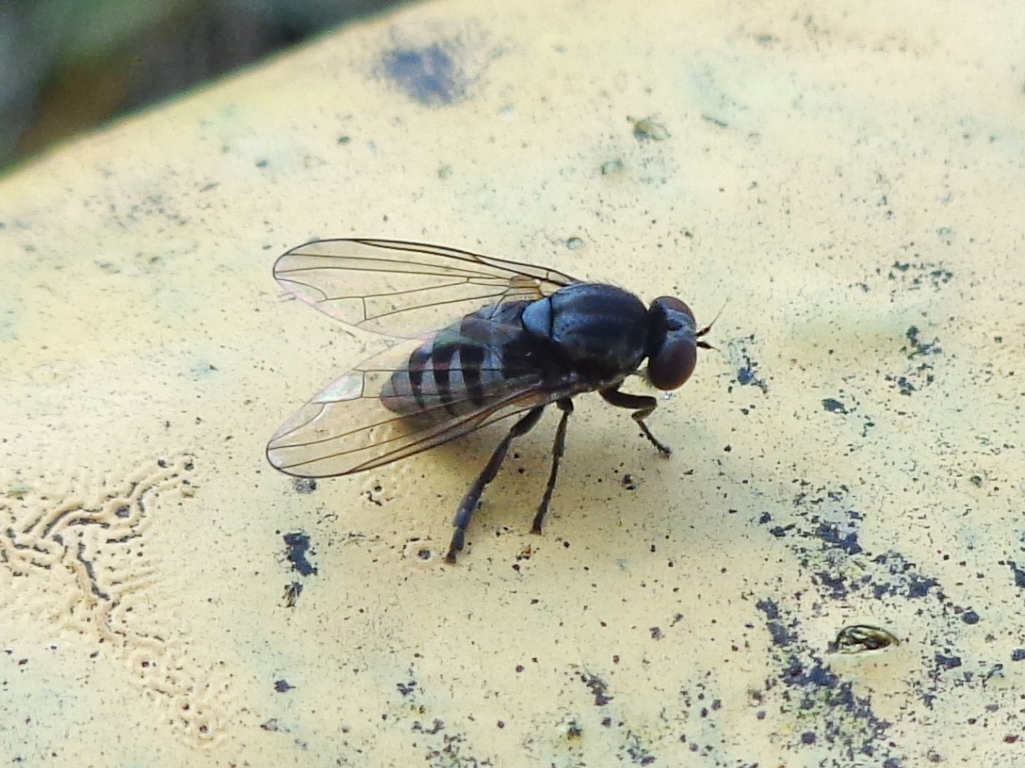
- Platypeza hirticeps

Scientific classification
- Kingdom: Animalia
- Phylum: Arthropoda
- Clade: Pancrustacea
- Class: Insecta
- Order: Diptera
- Family: Platypezidae
- Genus: Platypeza
- Species: P. hirticeps

Binomial name
- Platypeza hirticeps Verrall, 1901

= Platypeza hirticeps =

Species of fly

Platypeza hirticeps is a species of flat-footed flies in the family Platypezidae.
