= Phoenix Equity Partners =

UK private equity firm

- Company type: Limited partnership
- Industry: Private equity
- Founded: 2001; 25 years ago
- Headquarters: London, United Kingdom
- Key people: David Burns (Managing Partner), Kevin Keck (Managing Partner)
- Products: private equity funds
- Total assets: £900 million
- Website: www.phoenix-equity.com

Phoenix Equity Partners is a United Kingdom mid-market private equity firm. It specialises in partnering with founder-entrepreneurs and their teams to grow their businesses. Phoenix typically invests £10–60 million of equity per partnership.

== History ==
Phoenix was co-founded in 2001 by Hugh Lenon, Sandy Muirhead, James Thomas, David Burns and Kevin Keck. David Burns and Richard Daw were made Managing Partners in 2014.

More recently, in September 2024, the firm launched its Flagship Fund and Growth Partnership Fund, raising over £600 million to pursue mid-market buyouts and growth investments across the UK and Europe.

In 2025, Kevin Keck was appointed co-Managing Partner alongside David Burns, reflecting a leadership update at the firm.

== Recent transactions ==
Phoenix has been active across technology, healthcare, and mid-market buyouts, with a series of investments and fund launches that reflect its sector-focused strategy.

In August 2024, Phoenix backed Cybanetix, a UK-based cybersecurity provider specialising in managed detection and response for mid-market businesses.

The following month, the firm closed a £200 million continuation vehicle for Nineteen Group and Envisage Dental, extending ownership to fund buy-and-build strategies and organic growth initiatives.

In December 2024, Phoenix acquired a stake in London Gynaecology, a specialist women's health clinic group. The deal provided capital to expand services and locations amid rising investor interest in women's health.

In July 2025, Phoenix invested in FutureMeds, a clinical trial management services provider operating across Europe, supporting growth in patient recruitment and site capacity across its network.
